= Dan Ryckert =

American journalist

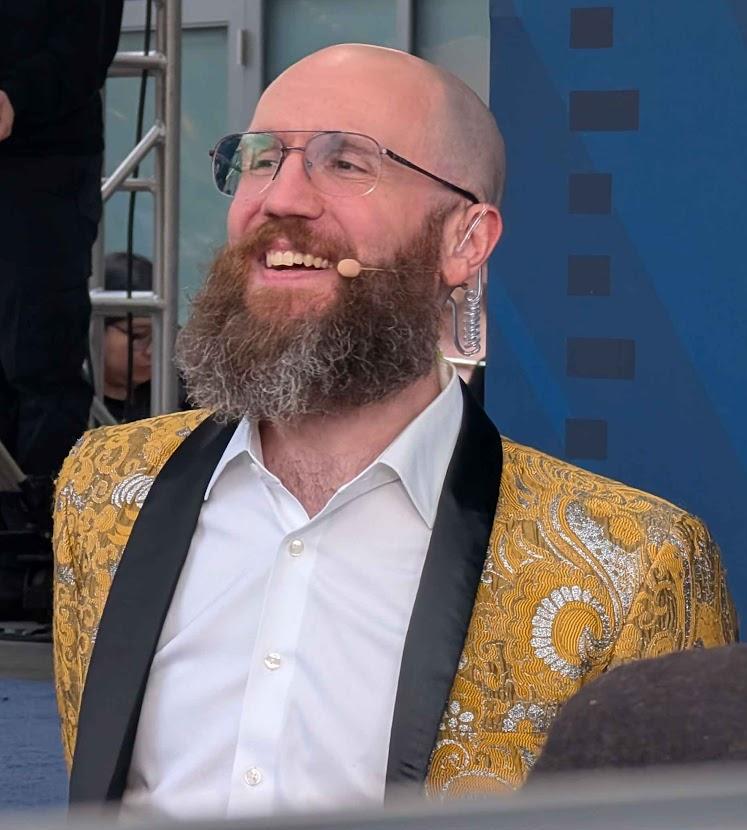
- Ryckert in 2024
- Born: June 16, 1984 (age 42)
- Occupations: Video game journalist, producer, writer
- Notable credit(s): Game Informer magazine senior associate editor (2009–2014); Giant Bomb senior content producer (2014–2020); WWE podcast producer (2020–2022); Giant Bomb creative director (2022–2025); Giant Bomb co-owner (2025–present)
- Title: Owner and Chief Content Officer
- Spouse: Bianca Ryckert (m. 2017)

Twitch information
- Channel: DanRyckert
- Genre: Video games
- Followers: 37.2 thousand
- Last updated: July 1, 2025

Daniel Joseph Ryckert (born June 16, 1984) is an American Twitch streamer, podcaster, and former video game journalist. In 2011, Complex magazine named Ryckert one of the twenty-five "raddest" game journalists to follow on Twitter. Ryckert has made three non-player character (NPC) appearances in video games; in 2011's L.A. Noire, 2014's Infamous Second Son and 2017's 2064: Read Only Memories.

Joining GameStop's Game Informer magazine in 2009, becoming senior associate editor, Ryckert reviewed games and made video content for its website. This included celebrity appearance videos featuring Gwar and Andrew W.K. During his time with the magazine, Ryckert broke two Guinness World Records, after playing two gaming marathons. In 2014 Ryckert, along with Game Informer video producer Jason Oestreicher, would both join CBS Interactive's Giant Bomb website, with Ryckert later moving from their San Francisco office to their New York office. In addition to weekly appearances on the Giant Bombcast and Giant Beastcast podcasts, Ryckert continued to produce video content such as playing the video game Super Mario Bros. 3 while riding the Medusa roller coaster and creating the Metal Gear-based "Metal Gear Scanlon" series with Drew Scanlon. In 2020, Ryckert became a podcast producer for WWE, before returning to Giant Bomb as a creative director in 2022 and becoming a co-owner of the site in 2025.

In 2017, Ryckert and fiancé Bianca Monda were spotlighted in the media when they won a competition to be the first couple to be married at the Taco Bell Cantina in Las Vegas. The ceremony was held in June 2017. Ryckert is also an author and professional wrestling manager.

== Early life and career ==
Ryckert graduated from Olathe East High School in 2002 and the University of Kansas in 2007.

=== Game Informer (2009–2014) ===
Ryckert joined Game Informer in 2009, becoming most known for his video content produced, as well as breaking two Guinness World Records. Upon the release of the 2010 Xbox 360 peripheral, the Microsoft Kinect, Ryckert invited American rock band Gwar to play Kinect release Dance Central. Gwar, who were scheduled to play in Minneapolis, Minnesota where Game Informer is based accepted, with Oderus Urungus and Beefcake the Mighty joining Dan Ryckert to play the game. Following the death in 2014 of Oderus Urungus, real name Dave Brockie, the original article was updated and the video reposted in a tribute, thanking them for their appearance. 2011 saw the first of Ryckert's two successful Guinness World Record attempts. Ryckert broke the record for longest fighting game marathon along with three other editors, playing the Wii title Super Smash Bros. Brawl for 30 hours of non-stop play during 474 matches.

His second world record was set in accordance with five other Game Informer editors, with each of the six individuals setting gaming marathon records at the same time in different video game genres or franchise. Ryckert's record was in the Super Mario franchise, setting the record at 50 hours. In response to the Game Informer staff being resistant to playing games from the Mario Party franchise with him, 2012 saw Andrew W.K. visit the Game Informer office in the same vein as Gwar at Ryckert's behest, to play the new release Mario Party 9, the meeting a pun on Andrew W.K.'s song Party Hard.

=== Giant Bomb (2014–2020) ===
Following the death of co-founder and host Ryan Davis in 2013, Ryckert and fellow Game Informer staff member Jason Oestreicher joined Giant Bomb in 2014 as senior content producer and video producer, first introducing themselves on the July 1, 2014 episode of the Giant Bombcast. Succeeding what Vice described as a year of emptiness, mourning and with a gap in editorial, the magazine said that the hiring of Ryckert, Oestreicher and news editor Austin Walker together ensured that "Giant Bomb has a future."

I wish I could've known Ryan better – Whenever I spoke with him he was just the nicest, funniest guy in the world, I never considered myself a replacement and it was never presented to me as such. I'm just the new guy. I'm pretty public about my issues with anxiety so doing these panels and being in front of camera is certainly nerve-racking, but I've really enjoyed getting my personality out there. I love pro wrestling, and I've always loved the idea of these big personalities, but I never could be a wrestler because I'm tiny and weak. When I first came to Giant Bomb I could finally be that. It was a release for me.

— Dan Ryckert, September 30th, 2015

October 2014 saw Ryckert and Jeff Gerstmann compete against each other at Six Flags Discovery Kingdom in Vallejo, California. The mock competition saw them attempting to make the most progress in Super Mario Bros. 3 on the Nintendo 3DS while riding on the theme park's Medusa steel roller coaster. Publications with articles on the video such as Polygon and The A.V. Club joined in with the joke, with Polygon saying that it was "a glorious display of video game endurance. Possibly stupidity as well. But mostly, endurance." Metal Gear Scanlon was a Let's Play show for paid subscribers that ran from 2014 to 2017 in which Metal Gear Solid expert Ryckert guided Drew Scanlon through his first playthroughs of the Metal Gear franchise games. In a Metal Gear guide, James Davenport of PC Gamer cited Metal Gear Scanlon as his favorite method of watching start to finish playthroughs of Metal Gear Solid games. At the end of 2016, Ryckert relocated to New York to live closer to his wife's family and starting working out of Giant Bomb's New York office, becoming a permanent fixture on the Giant Beastcast podcast.

=== WWE (2020–2022) ===
On the January 3, 2020 episode of the Giant Beastcast, Ryckert announced his departure from Giant Bomb, having accepted a position as a podcast producer for WWE.

=== Solo Twitch Streaming and Fire Escape Podcast (2020–present) ===
While working at the WWE, Ryckert began streaming video game and entertainment comedy content again solo on Twitch. In 2021, Ryckert began a podcast alongside co-hosts Mike Mahardy of Polygon and Mary Kish of Twitch. Fire Escape is a bi-monthly video game and general comedy podcast.

=== Giant Bomb (2022–present) ===
On the June 7th, 2022 video "TheRitual.mp4", Giant Bomb announced the return of Dan Ryckert as Creative Director. On a personal livestream on April 30, 2025, Ryckert confirmed he would no longer be appearing in Giant Bomb content due to disagreements with parent company Fandom. One week later, it was announced that Fandom had sold Giant Bomb to its staff, with Ryckert becoming a co-owner.

== Media appearances ==
Ryckert appears as a non-player character in the 2011 video game release L.A. Noire, with LA Weekly detailing the motion capture techniques and equipment used to recreate his likeness in the game. This included the lack of a traditional motion capture process, the facial markers associated with facial motion capture. Another facial motion capture technique was used for Ryckert's appearance in 2014's Infamous Second Son, an "advanced 3D scanning process." Ryckert made his voice acting debut in 2017's 2064: Read Only Memories, playing a character called Broke. In 2026, Ryckert appeared as a contestant on the sixth season of the Fox game show The Floor.

== Publications ==
As an author, Ryckert has published six books. Two are of the fictional Air Force Gator series, inspired by action films of the 1980s. The books are described as a story of a military alligator pilot who is searching for his missing partner in the Middle East. After an altercation on Twitter between Ryckert and former Baseball player Jose Canseco, Canseco agreed to write the foreword for the sequel, Air Force Gator 2: Scales of Justice. ESPN reported that Canseco wrote the foreword under the impression, or pretending to be under the impression, that the book is a "thinly disguised metaphorical depiction of Canseco's life." Other books include Anxiety As an Ally, an autobiographical book based on Ryckert's experiences with anxiety disorders and panic attacks, and a memoir titled The Dumbest Kid in Gifted Class about his time growing up in Kansas.

== In professional wrestling ==
A noted fan of professional wrestling, Ryckert is known for appearing on WWE pay-per-views holding video game signs based on Waluigi. Ryckert joined the PAX video game wrestling league, League of Heels, as "Dirty Dan Ryckert", a villainous heel character that uses nefarious methods to win video game matches. During his time working for the San Francisco Giant Bomb office, Ryckert carried over his character to independent professional wrestling organizations in Northern California such as All Pro Wrestling as a professional wrestling manager. After transferring to Giant Bomb's New York office, Ryckert began appearing at Battle Club Pro events in New Jersey.

== Personal life ==
Ryckert is said to have an eccentric personality which leads to a lot of ideas that think outside the box. Former Game Informer co-workers Jeff Cork and Ben Hanson have commented on Ryckert that his time working for Game Informer was "kind of like a Make-A-Wish Foundation for Dan. His life is ridiculous" and "You realize you need to kind of reset your own gauges onto what works and what doesn't, because I've been proven wrong time and time again. Never bet against Dan's is kind of a constant refrain." Ryckert is a fan of 1980s action films, which both lead to the creation of his Air Force Gator series and being voted as one of the 25 raddest game journalists to follow on Twitter by Complex magazine. Complex commented on its choice of Ryckert because his posts are just as much about Terminator 2: Judgment Day and Die Hard as any given game review he's worked on. Ryckert is known to suffer from anxiety disorders and panic attacks.

=== Taco Bell wedding ===
In 2017, media outlets reported that Ryckert married Bianca Monda after winning a Taco Bell competition, the Love and Tacos contest, to become the first couple to be married at the fast-food restaurant chain's new in-house wedding chapel in its Las Vegas flagship Taco Bell Cantina. Both are said to be fans of Taco Bell, with Ryckert noted as once spending 90 dollars ordering everything off of the Taco Bell menu. Listeners of The Giant Beastcast informed Ryckert of the competition which had entrants submitting their entries via social media. Ryckert learned that he had won while in Orlando, Florida for WrestleMania 33. The competition was said to have 150 entrants and that 17,000 votes were cast to decide the top ten, with a winner being selected by a Taco Bell panel.

Ryckert met Monda in 2015 during his time in San Francisco, with Monda living in her native New Jersey, initially having a long-distance relationship, before moving together to New York. Ryckert describes Taco Bell as being one of the first conversations they had and that he "knew then that [they] were going to be a good fit.". Monda describes her life since being in a relationship with Ryckert as "so strange and exciting," and immediately agreed to entering the competition. The ceremony took place on June 25, 2017, with Taco Bell paying for the $600 wedding package. The wedding featured Taco Bell designed bouquet, garters, bow ties and a Cinnabon Delights wedding cake. Speaking after the wedding to Today, Ryckert said that despite the unique setting, "when I saw her walking down the aisle with her father – even in spite of the silly circumstances surrounding it – it was so easy to singularly focus on this genuinely important life event." A second traditional wedding ceremony took place in August 2017.
