= Beauty queen (disambiguation) =

A beauty queen is the female winner of a beauty pageant.

Beauty queen may also refer to:

- "Beauty Queen" (Roxy Music song), a 1973 song by Roxy Music
- "Beauty Queen" (Little Nell song), a 1980 single by Little Nell
- "Beauty Queen" (Lash song), a 2001 single by Lash
- Beauty Queen (TV series), a Philippine TV series
- "Beauty Queen", a 1996 opening track song by Tori Amos for her 1996 album Boys For Pele
- Beauty Queens, a 2011 novel by Libba Bray

== See also ==
- Beauty contest (disambiguation)
