= The Beautiful and the Damned =

The Beautiful and the Damned may refer to:

- The Beautiful and Damned, F. Scott Fitzgerald's second novel
  - The Beautiful and Damned (film), a 1922 silent film, adapted from the novel
  - Beautiful and Damned, a 2004 British stage musical about Fitzgerald and his wife, Zelda
- The Beautiful & Damned (album), 2017 album by G-Eazy
- The Beautiful and the Damned (album), 2002 album by Lash
- The Beautiful and the Damned: A Portrait of the New India, a non-fiction work by Siddhartha Deb
