= Aqua Twist =

Water-based teacup ride

La Ronde
- Coordinates: 45.524097°N 73.534199°W
- Status: Operating
- Opening date: June 1, 2013

Six Flags St. Louis
- Name: Tsunami Soaker
- Area: Chouteau's Market
- Status: Closed
- Opening date: May 24, 2014
- Closing date: 2023
- Replaced: Powder Keg

Six Flags Discovery Kingdom
- Name: The Penguin Ride
- Area: DC Universe
- Status: Removed
- Opening date: May 31, 2014
- Closing date: 2022
- Replaced: Wave Jumper

General statistics
- Manufacturer: Mack Rides
- Model: Twist 'n' Splash
- Vehicle type: Boats
- Height restriction: 36 in (91 cm)
- Platform diameter: 20 m (66 ft)
- Vehicles: 9
- Riders Per Vehicle: 6

Aqua Twist is a water-based teacups ride located at La Ronde in Montreal. Designed by Mack Rides, the Twist 'n' Splash model opened at La Ronde on June 1, 2013. The following season, two additional installations opened at Six Flags St. Louis (now named Mid America Adventure) and Six Flags Discovery Kingdom under the name Tsunami Soaker. The Six Flags Discovery Kingdom installation, called "The Penguin" was closed and demolished after the 2022 season, while the Six Flags St. Louis installation closed after the 2023 season, but remains Standing but not Operating (SBNO).

== History ==
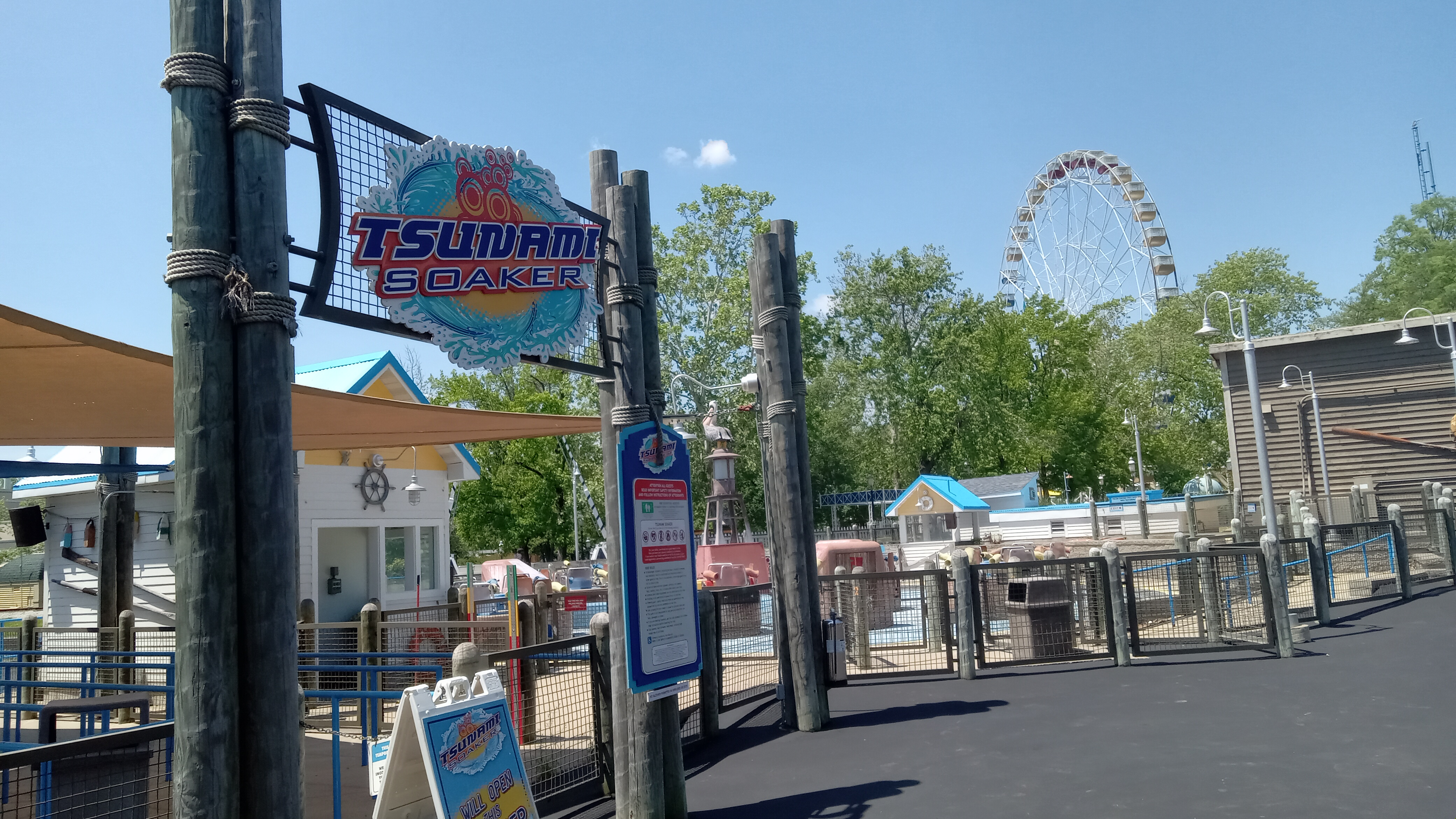
Tsumani Soaker at Six Flags St. Louis

On August 30, 2012, La Ronde's owner Six Flags announced that they would be adding Aqua Twist to the park in 2013. On June 1, 2013, the attraction officially opened to the public, making La Ronde the first amusement park in North America to install a ride of its kind.

On June 28, 2013, Six Flags filed for a trademark with the United States Patents and Trademark Office for the name Aqua Twist, leading to speculation that the company has plans for future installations at its other parks in the United States. On August 29, 2013, Six Flags officially announced the ride would be installed at Six Flags Discovery Kingdom and Six Flags St. Louis for the 2014 season under the name Tsunami Soaker. Tsunami Soaker at Six Flags St. Louis was the first to open in the United States on May 24, 2014, replacing the Powder Keg (also known as Hannibarrels) ride that had sat idle since 1997. A week later, Six Flags Discovery Kingdom open their new Tsunami Soaker on May 31, 2014, which is located at the former location of Wave Jumper located next to the wooden roller coaster, Roar.

In 2016, Six Flags renovated Roar at Six Flags Discovery Kingdom and reopened it as The Joker, which led to the re-theme of Tsunami Soaker to The Penguin Ride, themed after the DC Comics villain Penguin to fit the theme of the area of where the ride is located.

== Installations ==
| Name | Park | Area | Opening date | Closing Date | Refs |
|---|---|---|---|---|---|
| Aqua Twist | La Ronde | | June 1, 2013 | | |
| Tsunami Soaker | Six Flags St. Louis | Chouteau's Market | May 24, 2014 | 2023 | |
| The Penguin Ride | Six Flags Discovery Kingdom | DC Universe | May 31, 2014 | 2022 | |

== Ride experience ==
Riders board one of the nine boats. Before the ride's operational cycle begins the floor under the boats get filled with water, resulting in the boats floating. Once the ride begins the boats rotate like a traditional teacups attraction from an amusement park. There are six water guns that are equipped onto the boats as a way to splash other riders and bystanders. The ride operates with nine boats that feature six seats each, resulting in 54 riders per cycle.
