= She Is Beautiful =

Single by Andrew W.K.

from the album I Get Wet
- B-side: "We Want Fun" "A.W.K."
- Released: February 19, 2002
- Recorded: 2001
- Label: Island
- Songwriter: Andrew W.K.
- Producers: Andrew W.K.; Mario Dane; Scott Humphrey; John Fields

Andrew W.K. singles chronology
"Party Hard" (2001)	"She Is Beautiful" (2002)	"We Want Fun" (2002)

"She Is Beautiful" is the second single released by American musician Andrew W.K. from his debut album I Get Wet. It contains three previously released tracks and the video for "She Is Beautiful". The single peaked at no. 55 on the UK Singles Chart.

There were two promo singles released to radio stations for this single. The first promo single only had one track, the title song. The second promo single had the title song and the video for the song. The art for the first promo single had a black background, and in the middle, it said "ANDREW W.K." in white, and below that, it said "SHE IS BEAUTIFUL" in white. The art for the second promo single had a live picture of Andrew.

Andrew has performed this song live alongside Kelly Osbourne as a duet during the Ozzfest 2002 festival.

The song was also featured on the 2003 Freaky Friday soundtrack.

== Track listing ==
No.	Title	Length
1.	"She Is Beautiful"	3:35
2.	"We Want Fun" (AWKGOJ version)	4:23
3.	"A.W.K." (AWKGOJ version)	2:28
4.	"She Is Beautiful" (Video)	3:48

== Charts ==
Chart (2002)	Peak position
UK Singles (Official Charts)	55
UK Rock & Metal (Official Charts)	4
