= Beauty Queen (Lash song) =

Single by Lash

from the album The Beautiful and the Damned
- Released: August 2001
- Studio: Planet Studios, Perth, Western Australia
- Genre: Pop-punk
- Length: 3:45
- Label: Sputnik Records, EngineRoom Music
- Songwriters: Jessica Bennett, Andrew Klippel, Barry Palmer, Micaela Slayford, Belinda Reid, Jaclyn Pearson
- Producers: Andrew Klippel, Barry Palmer, Andy Baldwin

Lash singles chronology
"Take Me Away" (2001)	"Beauty Queen" (2001)	"Don't Ever Make My Mind Up" (2002)

"Beauty Queen" is a song by Australian pop-punk band Lash. It was released in August 2001 as the group's second single from their album, The Beautiful and the Damned (2002). The song peaked at number 31 on the ARIA charts. The song also appears on the soundtrack, Freaky Friday, for the 2003 Disney film of the same name, along with "Take Me Away", covered by actress Christina Vidal.

== Tracklisting ==
1. "Beauty Queen" (Jessica Bennett, Andrew Klippel, Barry Palmer, Micaela Slayford, Belinda Reid, Jaclyn Pearson) – 3:45
2. "Beauty Queen" (Illpickl's Bump & Grind mix)
3. "Take Me Away"

== Charts ==
Chart (2001)	Peak position
Australia (ARIA)	31

== Release history ==
Country	Date	Format	Label	Catalogue
Australia	August 2001	CD Single	Sputnik Records, EngineRoom Music	020472
