= Roar (roller coaster) =

Wooden roller coaster at Six Flags America

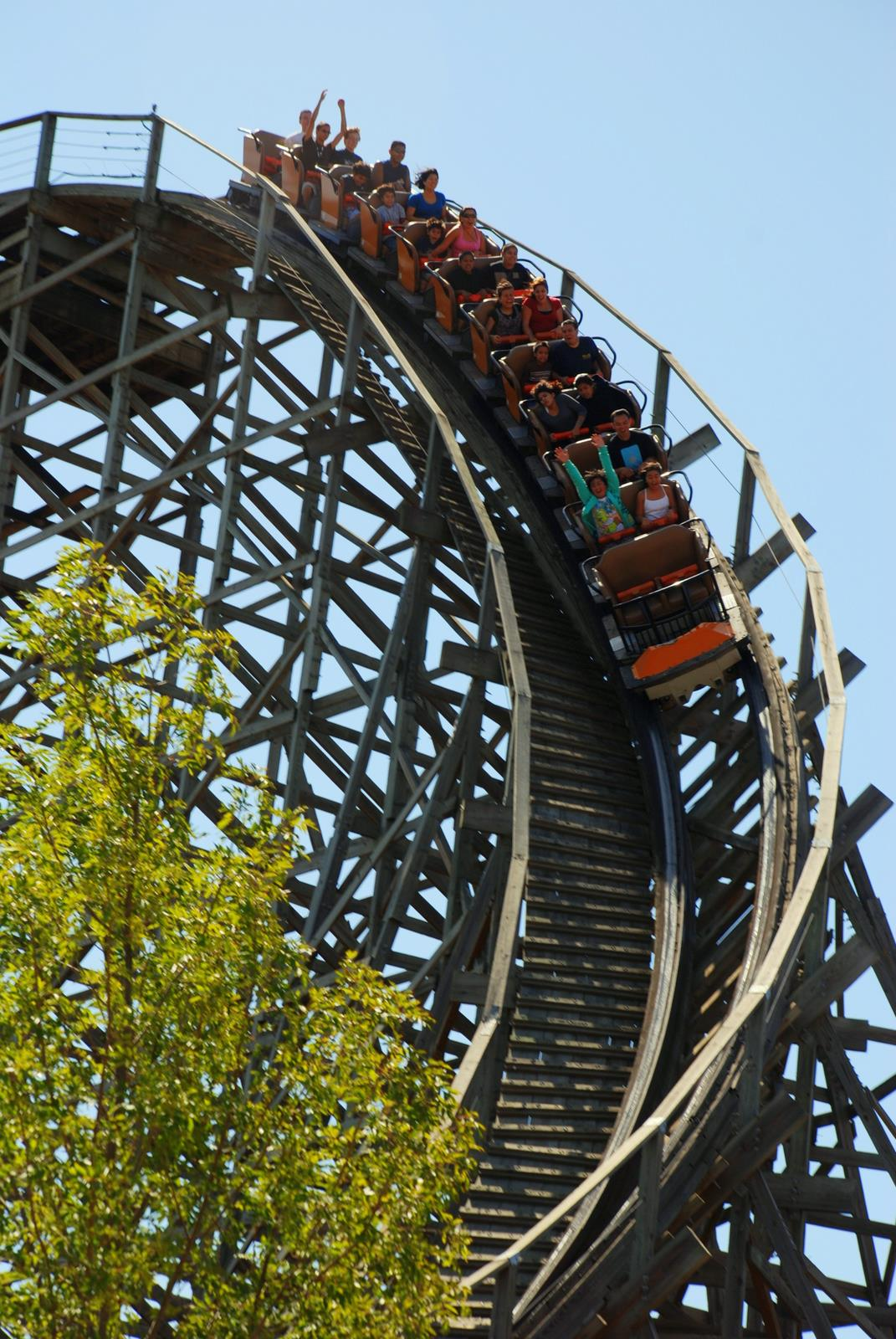
- 1. Logo; 2. Roar at Six Flags Discovery Kingdom

Six Flags America
- Park section: Chesapeake
- Coordinates: 38.907591°N 76.775993°W
- Status: Closed
- Opening date: May 2, 1998
- Closing date: November 2, 2025

Six Flags Discovery Kingdom
- Park section: Sky
- Coordinates: 38°08′17″N 122°13′58″W
- Status: Removed
- Opening date: May 14, 1999
- Closing date: August 16, 2015
- Replaced by: The Joker

General statistics
- Type: Wood
- Manufacturer: Great Coasters International
- Track layout: Twister
- Lift/launch system: Chain lift hill
- Height: 95 ft (29 m)
- Drop: 85 ft (26 m)
- Speed: 50.5 mph (81.3 km/h)
- Inversions: 0
- Duration: 1:52
- Max vertical angle: 50°
- G-force: 3.5
- Height restriction: 48 in (122 cm)
- Trains: 2 trains with 6 cars; riders arranged 2 across in 2 rows for a total of 24 riders per train
- Length: 3,468 ft (1,057 m) (America); 3,291 ft (1,003 m) (Discovery Kingdom)
- Flash Pass was Available
- Roar at RCDB

Roar (trademarked as ROAR) is a pair of wooden roller coasters in the United States – a decommissioned ride at Six Flags America in Woodmore, Maryland and a defunct ride at Six Flags Discovery Kingdom in Vallejo, California. Both rides were designed and built by Great Coasters International (GCI). In 2015, Discovery Kingdom announced the retirement of its version of Roar, which Rocky Mountain Construction later renovated and transformed into The Joker, a hybrid roller coaster. Roar at Six Flags America closed with the park on November 2, 2025.

== Design and operation ==
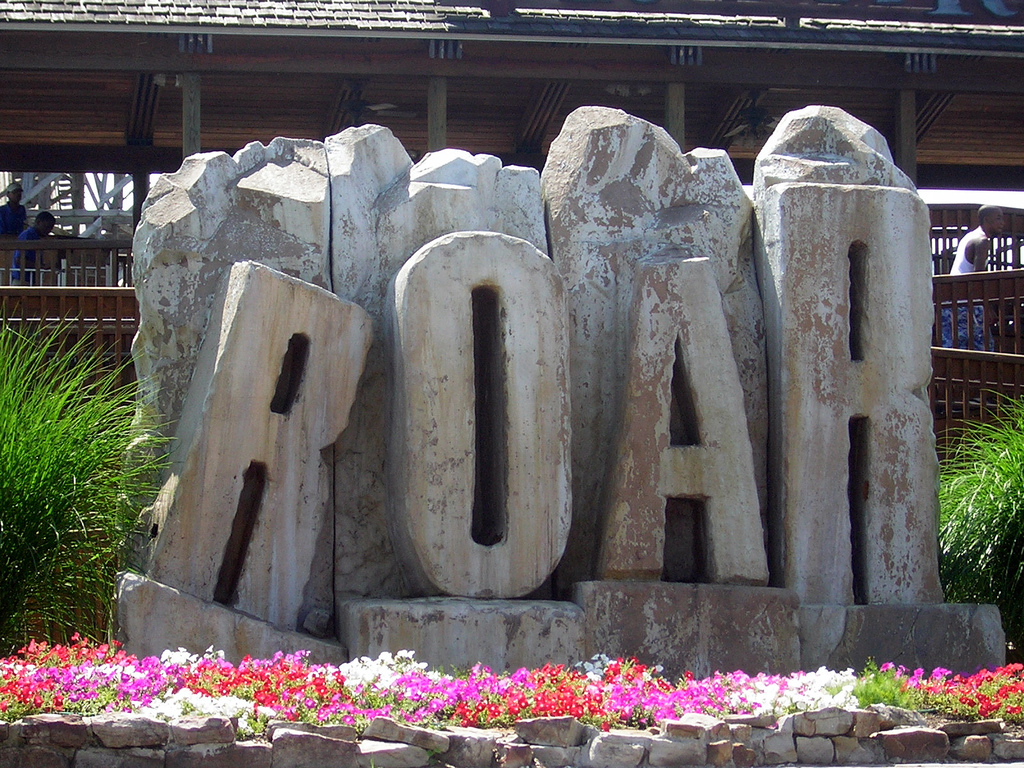
Roar entrance sign for Six Flags America

The ride is a wooden roller coaster with a chain lift hill system. It features a unique "Speed Shed" element over a large section of track, designed to enhance the sense of speed without the visual sensory loss of a traditional tunnel. Of the two trains used on the ride, each one seats a capacity of 24 people in six cars and utilize both seat belts and lap bars. The height of the roller coaster is 95 feet (29 m), and its drop is 85 feet (26 m); the maximum speed reached is 50.5 miles per hour (81.3 km/h). Unlike classic out and back rides, Roar is a twister design.

=== Six Flags America ===
Six Flags America's Roar, called Roar (East) by GCI, was built in 1998. Unlike its sibling in the west, this ride is longer at 3,468 feet (1,057 m) and has a slightly longer ride time. The longer track length is due to the ride's location on a slanting hillside, and longer drops on the station side and lift hill. Its trains, designed and maintained by Philadelphia Toboggan Coasters, are also different. Roar is one of the three rides at Six Flags America that featured an on-ride camera (the others being Superman: Ride of Steel and Firebird). It has been removed along with the camera on Apocalypse. The camera for Apocalypse returned and was re-added for the 2019 transition to Firebird. The ride is situated in the park's Chesapeake themed section.

On May 1, 2025, Six Flags announced that the Six Flags America park will close at the end of the 2025 season on November 2, 2025. The status on the future of the Roar roller coaster was not given at the time of the announcement.

=== Six Flags Discovery Kingdom ===
Six Flags Discovery Kingdom's Roar, called Roar (West) by GCI, was built in 1999 in light of adding the Six Flags moniker to the Marine World amusement park. At 3,291 feet (1,003 m), this coaster was shorter than the installation at Six Flags America. The ride consisted of two 12 car Millennium Flyer trains. This type of train helps give the sensation of a steel roller coaster utilizing the classic wooden style design. Roar was situated in the Sky animal-themed area of the park. It closed on August 16, 2015.

On July 16, 2015, Six Flags Discovery Kingdom announced that Roar would be retired on August 16, 2015. The closure marked the completion of the attraction's seventeenth season. Park president Don McCoy released a statement that the ride was being removed to make room for future expansion. An estimated 11 million visitors to the park have ridden the roller coaster since its debut in 1999. On September 3, 2015, Six Flags announced that the Roar at Six Flags Discovery Kingdom would be transformed into a "wood-steel hybrid" named The Joker featuring three inversions. Rocky Mountain Construction performed the conversion, opening the new version on May 28, 2016.

== Awards ==
Golden Ticket Awards: Top wood Roller Coasters
Year									1998	1999
Ranking									–	–
Year	2000	2001	2002	2003	2004	2005	2006	2007	2008	2009
Ranking	–	–	–	39	48	49	39	42	–	–
Year	2010	2011	2012	2013	2014	2015	2016	2017	2018	2019
Ranking	–	–	–	–	–	–	–	–	–	–
Year	2020	2021	2022	2023	2024	2025	2026			
Ranking	N/A	–	–	–	–	–	–			
