= Life with Mikey =

1993 film by James Lapine

- Theatrical release poster
- Directed by: James Lapine
- Written by: Marc Lawrence
- Produced by: Teri Schwartz; Scott Rudin
- Starring: Michael J. Fox; Nathan Lane; Cyndi Lauper; Christina Vidal
- Cinematography: Rob Hahn
- Edited by: Robert Leighton
- Music by: Alan Menken
- Production company: Touchstone Pictures
- Distributed by: Buena Vista Pictures Distribution
- Release date: June 4, 1993
- Running time: 91 minutes
- Country: United States
- Language: English
- Box office: $12.4 million

Life with Mikey (also known as Give Me a Break) is a 1993 American comedy film directed by James Lapine and written by Marc Lawrence. The film stars Michael J. Fox, Nathan Lane, Cyndi Lauper and Christina Vidal in her film acting debut.

== Plot ==
Michael Chapman was once a successful child actor on the popular sitcom Life With Mikey but, like many child actors, was unable to stretch that success into adulthood. These days, he is a partner at the Chapman & Chapman Talent Agency with his brother Ed, representing child talent. However, the agency is struggling since Michael largely doesn't take the job seriously and often clashes with their most successful client, the vain and egotistical commercial actor Barry Corman.

One day, while walking down the street, Michael bumps into a young girl named Angie Vega. After realizing she stole his wallet, Michael chases her. She escapes but is shortly caught trying to lift another wallet and puts on an impromptu acting display to talk her way out of trouble. Michael joins in her act and, after the crowd disperses, immediately offers to represent her. She initially runs away but meets up with him later and returns his wallet and accepts his offer. Crashing a callback audition for a Sunburst Cookies commercial, Michael charms his way into getting Angie an audition. Angie surprises company president Mr. Corcoran by giving a tirade about his hunting trophies and the casting director offers Michael and Angie the job on the spot.

Michael later stops by Angie's house, where she lives with her older sister and her sister's boyfriend, to drop off the contract. Angie refuses to let him in but later drops by his apartment with the signed contract and then promptly talks her way into moving in with Michael. The two initially clash due to Michael's unkempt habits and Angie's more tidy nature and even more so when Michael forces Angie to go back to school. The day before her commercial shoot, Angie gets into a fight at school and gets a black eye. Initially dismayed, Corcoran decides to proceed after Angie spins a tale about the fight being over Angie defending Sunburst Cookies. Despite some initial struggles, Angie manages to shoot a wonderful commercial. Returning home that night, Angie passes out from exhaustion. Afterwards, Michael and Angie start to bond.

Michael is later called into Angie's school when Angie gets into another fight. The teacher informs Michael that Angie started the fight because she has a crush on the other student, Evan, and acts out at school because she's lonely and doesn't know how to relate to other kids. Michael decides to throw Angie an impromptu birthday party with the other kids at the agency and invites Evan, even taking everyone to a wrestling match where the wrestlers and the crowd sing "Happy Birthday to You" and put on a staged match with Michael.

The jubilation is short lived, however, when Corcoran's attorney informs Ed and Michael that Angie's older sister is not her legal guardian as Angie had told them but it is instead her father, Richard, who is alive and in a rehab facility upstate. Corcoran demands that Richard sign the contracts so he can air Angie's commercials and threatens to hold the Chapmans legally responsible if they fail to do so. Michael visits Richard, who expresses regret for not being there for his daughters after his wife died and his desire to return to his family before signing the contracts. Michael returns home and confronts Angie about her father, leading an upset Angie to leave Michael's apartment and return home to her sister.

Shortly afterwards, Michael arrives at the agency to learn that Barry has been poached by a rival agent and Ed, fed up with trying to keep the agency afloat, has decided to take a job with their uncle. Michael then learns that Angie has been arrested for shoplifting from an uptown department store. Michael goes to collect her and learns that she was caught trying to shoplift Christmas presents for her sister and for Michael after her sister's boyfriend stole her pay from the commercial. They are both surprised when Angie's first commercial finally airs on television and the store security staff decides to let her go. When Angie learns that the agency is closing, she arranges a date with Barry and then strongarms him into returning to Chapman & Chapman, surprising Ed and Michael during an impromptu birthday party she throws for the latter.

Ed announces he still plans to leave the agency until a new talent, Kimberly, shows up to audition. She starts off singing in a meek, quiet voice but, with Michael's encouragement, begins to belt out the song so beautifully that Ed agrees to stay and run the agency with Michael. The film then ends with Michael, Ed and all the kids throwing cake at Barry after he makes another egotistical comment.

== Cast ==
- Michael J. Fox as Michael "Mikey" Chapman
- Nathan Lane as Ed Chapman
- Cyndi Lauper as Geena Briganti
- Christina Vidal as Angie Vega
- David Krumholtz as Barry Corman
- David Huddleston as Mr. Corcoran
- Tim Progosh as Lawyer Norman Feller
- Victor Garber as Brian Spiro
- Paula Garcés as Janice Vega
- Mary Alice as Mrs. Gordon
- Kathryn Grody as Mrs. Corman
- Sean Power as Lenny
- Heather MacRae as Mrs. Tobin
- Blake McGrath as Acrobat
- Rubén Blades as Richard Vega
- Aida Turturro as Officer Moran
- Christine Baranski as Carol
- Kevin Zegers as Little Mikey
- Mandy Patinkin as Irate Man
- Jerry Lawler as The Lobotomizer
- Jeff Jarrett as Evil Eye

== Production ==
Marc Lawrence came up with the premise for Life with Mikey after reflecting on his five years working as a writer and supervising producer on Family Ties and decided to write a screenplay about a character in a similar transitional stage in their career. Producer Scott Rudin became involved with the project in 1989. The Walt Disney Company briefly considered putting the film into turnaround, but after Eddie Murphy expressed interest in the film this led to Disney changing their minds. Theatre director James Lapine was hired to direct the film and also brought on several cast and crew for the film who had worked in theater with Lapine.

In May 1992, it was reported that Michael J. Fox would star in the Marc Lawrence scripted Life with Mikey for Touchstone Pictures. After completing For Love or Money, Fox exercised an option in his contract with Universal Pictures allowing him to work with an outside studio and accepted the offer from Disney. Christina Vidal was not cast until two weeks before production was slated to commence.

== Reception ==
The film received generally negative reviews. Review aggregator RottenTomatoes reports that 25% of the 12 critics gave the film a positive review, with 3 fresh and 9 rotten review, with a rating average of 4.05 out of 10.

=== Box office ===
The film debuted at number 7 at the US box office.
