= Freaky Friday (soundtrack) =

Soundtrack album by Various artists
- Released: July 22, 2003
- Genres: Pop-punk; punk rock; post-grunge; alternative rock
- Length: 48:49
- Label: Hollywood
- Producers: Mitchell Leib; Lisa Brown

Professional ratings
Review scores
Source	Rating
AllMusic	3/5 stars

Freaky Friday is the soundtrack album to the 2003 Disney film of the same name which features songs by various artists. AllMusic called the album a "mixed bag", specifically praising American Hi-Fi's "The Art of Losing", The Donnas' "Backstage", Andrew W.K.'s "She Is Beautiful", and Joey Ramone's "What a Wonderful World", while strongly criticizing the rest of the album. British pop group Girls Aloud recorded the track "You Freak Me Out" for the film but it was ultimately not included in the project, and instead appeared on the re-release of their debut album later that year.

The album was certified gold by the RIAA in December 2003 for shipping over 500,000 copies.

== Track listing ==
1. Lindsay Lohan – "Ultimate"
2. Simple Plan – "Happy Together"
3. Lillix – "What I Like About You"
4. American Hi-Fi – "The Art of Losing"
5. Forty Foot Echo – "Brand New Day"
6. Halo Friendlies – "Me vs. the World"
7. Christina Vidal – "Take Me Away"
8. Chad Michael Murray – "...Baby One More Time" (Intro)
9. Bowling for Soup – "...Baby One More Time"
10. The Donnas – "Backstage"
11. Andrew W.K. – "She Is Beautiful"
12. Diffuser – "I Wonder"
13. Lash – "Beauty Queen"
14. Ashlee Simpson – "Just Let Me Cry"
15. Joey Ramone – "What a Wonderful World"
16. Rolfe Kent – "Fortune Cookie?"

== Charts ==
=== Weekly charts ===
Chart (2003–2004)	Peak position
French Albums (SNEP)	137
US Billboard 200	19
US Soundtrack Albums (Billboard)	3

=== Year-end charts ===
Chart (2004)	Position
US Billboard 200	195
US Soundtrack Albums (Billboard)	8

== Certifications ==
Region	Certification	Certified units/sales
United States (RIAA)	Gold	500,000^{^}
^{^} Shipments figures based on certification alone.
