= Lash (band) =

Australian pop-punk band

Background information
- Origin: Perth, Western Australia, Australia
- Genres: Pop-punk; alternative rock
- Years active: 1996–2003
- Label: Festival Mushroom
- Past members: Belinda-Lee Reid; Jaclyn Pearson; Jessicca Bennett; Micaela Slayford

Lash was an all-female pop-punk band from Perth, Western Australia. The members Belinda-Lee Reid (vocals, guitar), Jaclyn Pearson (drums), Jessicca Bennett (lead guitar) and Micaela Slayford (vocals, bass) who all met at the Catholic Santa Maria College. The group released one studio album, The Beautiful and the Damned in 2002.

== History ==
=== 1996–2003: Exteria and Lash ===
After being together for a few weeks, the girls, named Exteria, entered the song "Aloha Mr Hand" into the Open Youth Category for the under-18s WAM Song of the Year in the 1996 West Australian Music Industry Awards. Exteria won the $1,000 prize, and came to the attention of manager Andrew Klippel.

In 2001, they renamed themselves Lash and signed to Festival Mushroom Records. Lash released their debut single "Take Me Away" in March 2001 and peaked at number 33 on the ARIA Charts. "Beauty Queen" was released in August 2001 and peaked at number 31 on the ARIA Charts. At the ARIA Music Awards of 2001, "Take Me Away" was nominated for ARIA Award for Breakthrough Artist – Single.

Lash won Best New Australian Artist on Commercial Radio at the Commercial Radio Australia Awards of 2001.

Throughout 2002, Lash toured with Eskimo Joe, The Living End, Motor Ace and Ash. "Don't Ever Make My Mind Up" was released in February 2002, which was followed by their debut album The Beautiful and the Damned, which was released in April 2002 and peaked at number 74 on the ARIA Charts. In 2002, Lash represented Australia at the Golden Stag Festival in Romania.

Their song "Beauty Queen" was also featured in the 2003 film Freaky Friday starring Jamie Lee Curtis and Lindsay Lohan, as well as the film's soundtrack. "Take Me Away" was also included, covered by Christina Vidal, as performed by Lohan's character's band in the film.

The group disbanded in 2003.

=== 2004–present: post-Lash ===
Belinda-Lee Reid: After the break-up of Lash, Reid has pursued a solo career. She was the subject of an episode of the documentary TV program The Hit Game, which aired in Australia on ABCTV on 4 October 2005, and showed her recording demos with Palmer, assisted by Pearson and Bennett. In this show, she lamented the stigma attached to her by music industry leaders for being in a 'failed' act.

Reid's debut solo extended play The Road from Lillyfield was touted for release in 2005 but never emerged. In 2006, Reid formed a new band called The Silver Scene and released a self-titled extended play for free download on Triple J Unearthed's website. By 2014, Reid was working as a real estate agent.

Jessicca Bennett and Jaclyn Pearson: After the break-up of Lash, Bennett and Pearson were part of group The Preytells from 2004 to 2009. They won the National Campus Band Competition in 2005.

Pearson is a microbiologist at the Hudson Institute of Medical Research in Melbourne. She has 3 children.

Since 2016, Bennett has run Love Shack Studios in Footscray, Victoria.

In 2025, Christina Vidal's cover version of "Take Me Away" from the soundtrack of Freaky Friday was featured in the sequel movie Freakier Friday. Bennett and Pearson attended the movie premiere in Los Angeles in July 2025. Reid and Bennett attended the Australian premiere in Sydney in August 2025.

== Discography ==
=== Albums ===
List of studio albums, with selected details and chart positions
| Title | Album details | Peak chart positions |
| Title | Album details | AUS |
|---|---|---|
| The Beautiful and the Damned | Released: 1 April 2002; Label: EngineRoom Music, Sputnik (334942); Format: CD | 74 |

=== Singles ===
List of singles, with selected chart positions
| Title | Year | Peak chart positions | Album |
| Title | Year | AUS | Album |
|---|---|---|---|
| "Take Me Away" | 2001 | 33 | The Beautiful and the Damned |
| "Beauty Queen" | 2001 | 31 | The Beautiful and the Damned |
| "Don't Ever Make My Mind Up" | 2002 | 86 | The Beautiful and the Damned |

== Awards ==
=== ARIA Music Awards ===
The ARIA Music Awards is an annual awards ceremony held by the Australian Recording Industry Association. They commenced in 1987.

| Year | Nominee / work | Award | Result | Ref. |
|---|---|---|---|---|
| 2001 | "Take Me Away" | Breakthrough Artist - Single | Nominated | |

=== WAM Song of the Year ===
The WAM Song of the Year was formed by the Western Australian Rock Music Industry Association Inc. (WARMIA) in 1985, with its main aim to develop and run annual awards recognising achievements within the music industry in Western Australia.

| Year | Nominee / work | Award | Result (wins only) |
|---|---|---|---|
| 1996 | | Grand Prize | Won |
