= Ultimate (Lindsay Lohan song) =

Promotional single by Lindsay Lohan

from the album Freaky Friday
- Released: August 4, 2003
- Recorded: 2003
- Genre: Pop-punk
- Length: 3:06
- Label: Hollywood
- Songwriters: Robert Ellis Orrall; Jeff Coplan
- Producers: Robert Ellis Orrall; Jeff Coplan

Audio video
- "Ultimate" on YouTube

"Ultimate" is a song by Lindsay Lohan from the Freaky Friday soundtrack. Written and produced by Robert Ellis Orrall and Jeff Coplan, it was played during the end credits of the film. It enjoyed some success due to airplay on Radio Disney and Disney Channel, with clips of scenes from the film being used to help promote it. The song was also later included on the soundtrack for the series That's So Raven.

== Covers ==
Canadian indie rock band the Beaches recorded a cover version of the track which was released on August 1, 2025, as part of the soundtrack of the movie's sequel Freakier Friday. Orrall, the song's original songwriter and producer, also released his own version that same month.
