= Take Me Away (Lash song) =

2001 single by Lash

Single by Lash

from the album The Beautiful and the Damned
- B-side: "Aloha Mr Hand"
- Released: 19 March 2001
- Studio: Planet (Perth, Western Australia)
- Genre: Pop-punk
- Length: 3:37
- Label: Sputnik, EngineRoom Music
- Songwriters: Andrew Klippel, Barry Palmer, Lash
- Producers: Andrew Klippel, Barry Palmer, Andy Baldwin

Lash singles chronology
"Take Me Away" (2001)	"Beauty Queen" (2001)

"Take Me Away" is a song by Australian pop-punk band Lash. It was released on 19 March 2001 as the group's debut single and lead single from their album, The Beautiful and the Damned (2002). The song peaked at number 33 on the Australian Singles Chart. At the ARIA Music Awards of 2001, "Take Me Away" was nominated for Breakthrough Artist – Single.

The song was covered by actress Christina Vidal for the 2003 Disney film Freaky Friday and its soundtrack. Lash also contributed their following single "Beauty Queen" for the film's soundtrack. In 2025, Vidal re-recorded the song for the film's sequel Freakier Friday and its soundtrack.

== Track listing ==
1. "Take Me Away" – 3:37
2. "Aloha Mr Hand" – 2:25

== Charts ==
Chart (2001)	Peak position
Australia (ARIA)	33

== Release history ==
Region	Date	Format	Label(s)	Catalogue	Ref.
Australia	19 March 2001	CD	Sputnik; EngineRoom Music	020122	
