= Party Hard (Andrew W.K. song) =

Single by Andrew W.K.

from the album I Get Wet
- B-side: "Violent Life" (7")
- Released: October 29, 2001
- Recorded: 2001
- Genre: Hard rock; pop metal
- Length: 3:06
- Label: Island; Mercury
- Songwriter: Andrew W.K.
- Producers: Andrew W.K.; Mario Dane; Scott Humphrey

Andrew W.K. singles chronology
"Room to Breathe" (1998)	"Party Hard" (2001)	"She Is Beautiful" (2002)

Music video
- "Party Hard" on YouTube

"Party Hard" is a song by American rock musician Andrew W.K., first released as a single in 2001 and included on his debut album I Get Wet. The song provided Andrew W.K. with his first mainstream hit, reaching number 19 of the UK Singles Charts upon release.

The UK single contained one previously released track ("Make Sex"), one previously unreleased track ("Violent Life") and the video for "Party Hard". A promo single for this song was released to radio stations in the US in 2002. The promo single had the title song, the video for the song and a track titled "Andrew W.K."

== Reception ==
"Party Hard" was named the 89th best hard rock song of all time by VH1.

Pitchfork Media ranked the song #129 on its list of the Top 500 tracks of the 2000s. Reviewer Mark Richardson wrote: "Before Red Bull and vodka became fashionable and sports drink companies made the decade all about the pursuit of eXtreme energy, the movement already had its anthem."

== Music video ==
The video starts with Andrew W.K. grooming himself and tying his shoes in a bathroom. He looks in a mirror, revealing that he has an incision on his forehead in the position of his third eye. Then, he turns on a light switch that turns on lights in a warehouse that has a stage on it. Afterwards, W.K. and his band perform the song on stage.

== Soundtrack appearances ==
The song appeared in notable films, web shows and video games including Stealing Harvard, The Smash Brothers, Pro Evolution Soccer 2010, The Secret Life of Pets, Diary of a Wimpy Kid: Rodrick Rules, Madden NFL 2003, Madden NFL 25, and WWE 2K26, in addition to the TV spot for the film Monsters University.

"Party Hard" appeared as downloadable content in the video game Rock Band 3. It is also featured as one of the Extreme difficulty songs in the mobile rhythm game Beatstar.

== Other appearances ==
"Party Hard" is used as the walk-on music for Professional Darts Corporation darts player Steve Hine. It was formerly played by the now-defunct ECHL's San Francisco Bulls after scoring a goal during home games at the Cow Palace.

The song was featured in a commercial for Google's Android operating system, titled "And You", on October 15, 2014, as part of its "Be Together. Not the Same." campaign, as well as having been used on a trailer for Disney/Pixar's 2013 CGI film Monsters University a year earlier.

Beginning in October 2015, and following a fan petition, "Party Hard" is the goal song for the Pittsburgh Penguins. The Penguins, coincidentally, won back-to-back Stanley Cup championships with "Party Hard" as their official goal song. The Wilkes-Barre/Scranton Penguins, affiliate of the Pittsburgh Penguins, also began using the goal song full-time during the 2017–18 AHL season. After the Penguins changed their goal song to "Jump Around" by House of Pain for the 2019–20 season, they switched back to "Party Hard" the next season.

The Texas Revolution also began using the song after touchdowns during the 2016 season.

== Track listing ==
=== 7" vinyl ===
Side A
No.	Title	Length
1.	"Party Hard"	3:06

Side B
No.	Title	Length
1.	"Violent Life"	3:56

Mercury 588 813 7

=== CD single ===
All tracks are written by Andrew W.K.

No.	Title	Length
1.	"Party Hard"	3:06
2.	"Make Sex [AWKGOJ version]"	0:32
3.	"Violent Life"	3:56
4.	"Party Hard (Video)"

Mercury 588 813-2

== Charts ==
Chart (2001–02)	Peak position
Germany (GfK)	92
Sweden (Sverigetopplistan)	57
Scottish Singles Sales (Official Charts)	15
UK Singles (Official Charts)	19
UK Rock & Metal (Official Charts)	3

== Certifications ==
Region	Certification	Certified units/sales
United Kingdom (BPI)	Silver	200,000^{‡}
^{‡} Sales+streaming figures based on certification alone.
