= The Beautiful and the Damned (album) =

Studio album by Lash
- Released: 1 April 2002
- Studios: Planet Studios, (Perth); Studios 301, Sing Sing, Q Studios, (Sydney)
- Genre: Pop-punk
- Length: 40:12
- Labels: EngineRoom Music; Sputnik
- Producers: Andrew Klippel; Andy Baldwin; Barry Palmer

Singles from The Beautiful and the Damned
- 1. "Take Me Away" Released: March 2001; 2. "Beauty Queen" Released: August 2001; 3. "Don't Ever Make My Mind Up" Released: March 4 2002

The Beautiful and the Damned is the only album released by Australian pop-punk band Lash. Released in April 2002, the album peaked at number 74 on the ARIA Charts.

== Reception ==
Gemma Turner from Pulse said "It's a solid effort, which rocks the stereo system. Pop melodies are blended with a gritty rock sound with highlights including the edgy 'Don't Ever Make My Mind Up' and harmonious 'Live or Lie'."

== Track listing ==
1. "Take Me Away" – 3:34
2. "Don't Ever Make My Mind Up" – 3:16
3. "Better Than You" – 4:15
4. "Do It" – 3:23
5. "Beauty Queen" – 3:46
6. "Live or Lie" – 3:44
7. "Caged My Soul" – 3:46
8. "In My Head" – 3:53
9. "Dumb" – 3:57
10. "Only to Heal" – 6:38

== Charts ==
Chart performance for The Beautiful and the Damned
Chart (2001)	Peak position
Australian Albums (ARIA)	74

== Release history ==
Release history and formats for The Beautiful and the Damned
Region	Date	Label	Format	Catalogue
Australia	1 April 2002	EngineRoom Music, Sputnik Records	CD	334942
