= Medusa (Six Flags Discovery Kingdom) =

Floorless roller coaster

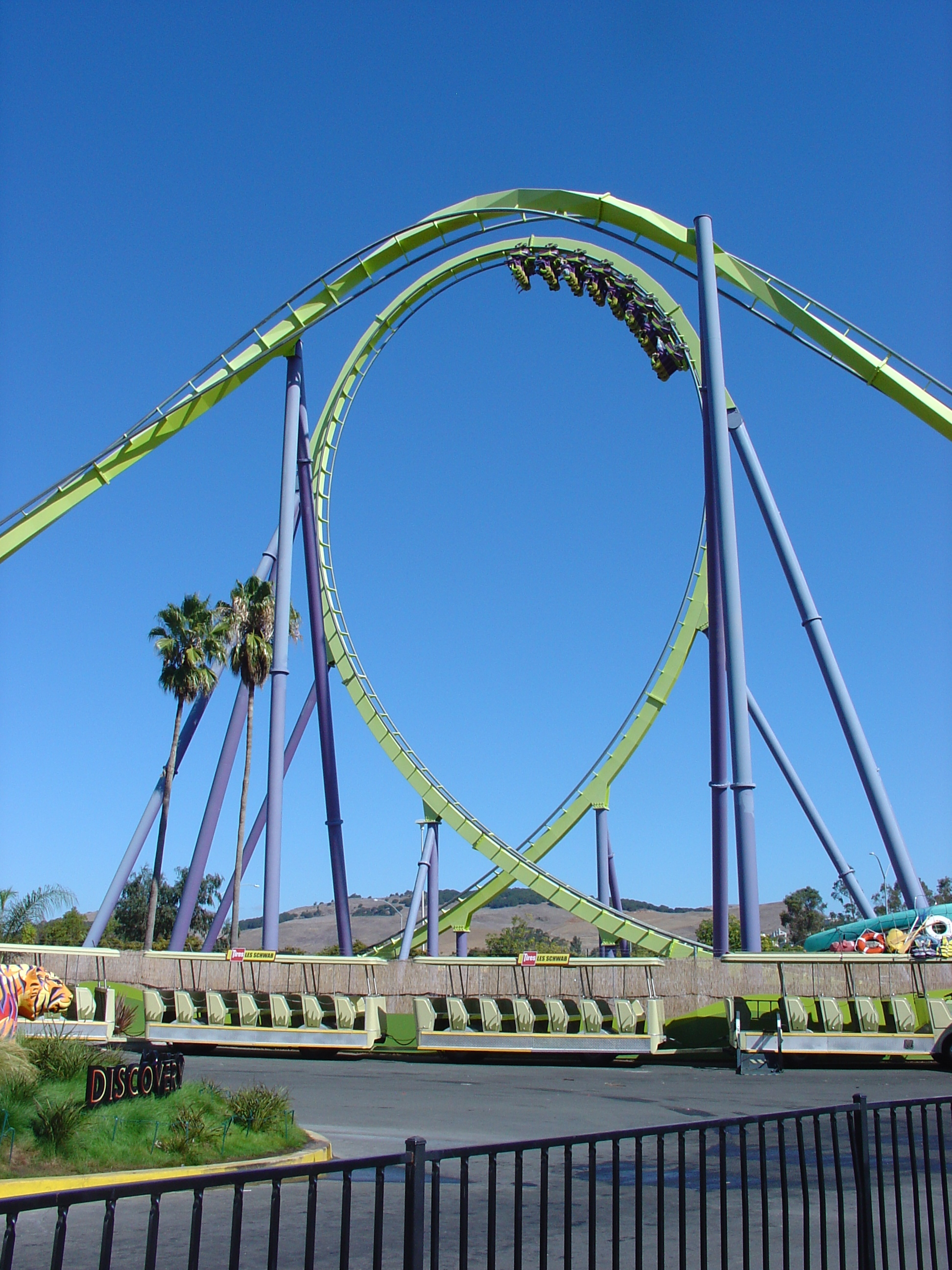
- Medusa's loop.

Six Flags Discovery Kingdom
- Location: Six Flags Discovery Kingdom
- Park section: Sky
- Coordinates: 38°08′26″N 122°14′01″W
- Status: Operating
- Opening date: March 18, 2000
- Cost: $15,000,000 USD

General statistics
- Type: Steel – Floorless Coaster
- Manufacturer: Bolliger & Mabillard
- Designer: Werner Stengel
- Model: Floorless Coaster
- Lift/launch system: Chain lift hill
- Height: 150 ft (46 m)
- Drop: 150 ft (46 m)
- Length: 3,937 ft (1,200 m)
- Speed: 65 mph (105 km/h)
- Inversions: 7
- Duration: 3:15
- Capacity: 1600 riders per hour
- G-force: 4.5
- Height restriction: 54 in (137 cm)
- Trains: 3 trains with 8 cars. Riders are arranged 4 across in a single row for a total of 32 riders per train.
- Fast Lane available
- Medusa at RCDB

Medusa is a steel roller coaster located at Six Flags Discovery Kingdom in Vallejo, California. Built by Bolliger & Mabillard, Medusa opened in 2000 as the first floorless roller coaster on the West Coast. The roller coaster features seven inversions, a 150-foot (46 m)-tall lift hill with a 150-foot (46 m) drop, and the first sea serpent roll element ever built on a B&M roller coaster. The ride is the longest coaster in Northern California at 3,937 feet (1,200 m) long and is notable as having one of the largest vertical loops in the world at 128 feet (39 m). It also shares the height record in Northern California with another two rides in the same park, The Flash: Vertical Velocity, and Superman: Ultimate Flight at 150 feet (46 m) high.

== History ==
On November 10, 1999, Six Flags Discovery Kingdom (then Six Flags Marine World) announced that Medusa would be added to the park. It would be a custom floorless coaster built by Bolliger & Mabillard. The ride officially opened on March 18, 2000. It was built over the park's original parking lot, directly in front of the park.

== Ride experience ==
After the floor drops and the front gate opens, the train is dispatched from the station into a large left-hand turnaround before ascending the 150 feet (46 m) lift hill. At the top, the train traverses a pre-drop to alleviate tension to the chain, followed by the drop, which descends into a below-ground trench. The train then enters a 128 feet (39 m) vertical loop, followed by a dive loop to the left, and a zero-g roll. Afterwards, the ride then enters a two-inversion sea serpent roll. After a mid-course brake run, the train descends into a left-hand drop under the brake run, followed by a corkscrews, after which the on-ride photo is taken. The train then travels through an inclined helix to the left before entering the second corkscrew, a right-hand helix, and an S-turn and into the final brake run before returning to the station.

== See also ==
- Medusa (Six Flags Great Adventure), a floorless roller coaster at Six Flags Great Adventure formerly known as Bizarro
