= The Joker (Six Flags Discovery Kingdom) =

Steel roller coaster

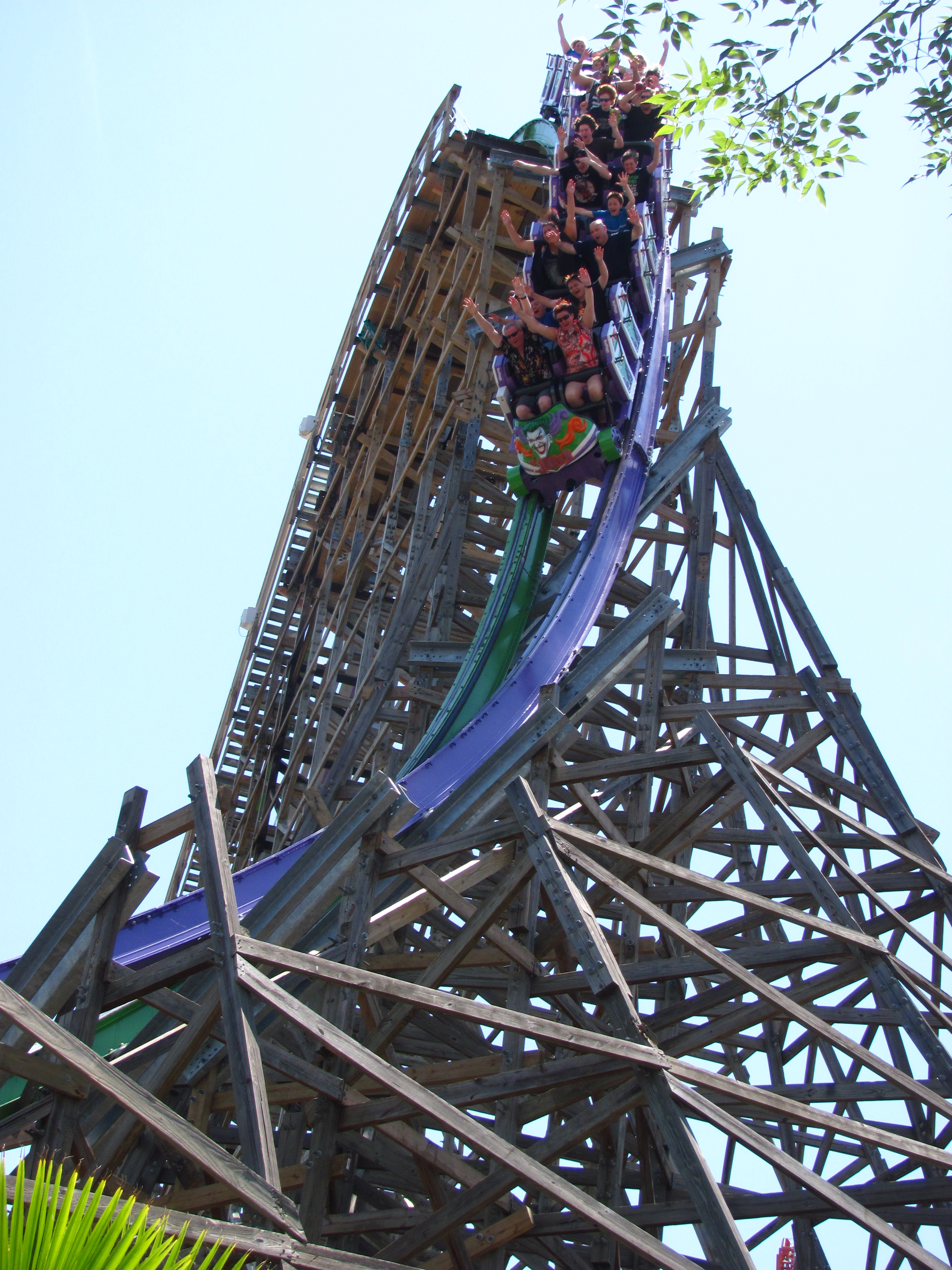

Six Flags Discovery Kingdom
- Location: Six Flags Discovery Kingdom
- Park section: DC Universe
- Coordinates: 38°08′17″N 122°13′58″W
- Status: Operating
- Soft opening date: May 25, 2016
- Opening date: May 29, 2016
- Cost: 7,800,000
- Replaced: Roar

General statistics
- Manufacturer: Rocky Mountain Construction
- Designer: Alan Schilke
- Model: I-Box
- Track layout: I-Box
- Lift/launch system: Chain lift hill
- Height: 100 ft (30 m)
- Drop: 95 ft (29 m)
- Length: 3,200 ft (980 m)
- Speed: 53 mph (85 km/h)
- Inversions: 3
- Duration: 2:00
- Max vertical angle: 78°
- Capacity: 1,128 riders per hour
- G-force: 3.4
- Height restriction: 48 in (122 cm)
- Trains: 2 trains with 6 cars. Riders are arranged 2 across in 2 rows for a total of 24 riders per train.
- Fast Lane available
- Wheelchair accessible
- Must transfer from wheelchair
- The Joker at RCDB

The Joker is a steel roller coaster at Six Flags Discovery Kingdom in Vallejo, California. The ride opened on May 29, 2016, as a rebuild of former wooden roller coaster Roar, adding a new steel track on top of Roar's wooden support structure. This hybrid configuration was implemented by Rocky Mountain Construction and is themed to the Joker, a comic book character villain featured in DC Comics publications. The original Roar roller coaster was constructed by Great Coasters International and opened in 1999.

== History ==
Roar was a roller coaster at Six Flags Discovery Kingdom constructed by Great Coasters International. When it debuted on May 14, 1999, Roar was the park's first wooden roller coaster and one of its first rides overall during the transition of adding amusement park rides to the marine mammal park. The coaster featured a height of 94 feet (29 m), a first drop of 85 feet (26 m), and a top speed of 50 mph (80 km/h).

In July 2015, Six Flags announced plans to permanently close Roar on August 16, 2015. On September 3, 2015, the park revealed plans to resurrect and convert Roar into a steel-tracked coaster called The Joker for the 2016 season. Rocky Mountain Construction was contracted to perform the renovation using the company's patented I-Box steel track technology married to the existing wooden support structure. The wood-steel hybrid was designed to incorporate three inversions, including a new element described as a "step-up under-flip inverted roll", and it also received new trains themed to the Joker comic book character.

Based on the success of previous roller coaster conversions in its partnership with Rocky Mountain Construction, Six Flags anticipated that Roar would benefit from the overhaul and transition into The Joker. Discovery Kingdom held a soft opening, a media preview event for The Joker, on May 25, 2016. The roller coaster was well-received and opened for Memorial Day Weekend on May 29, 2016.

== Characteristics ==
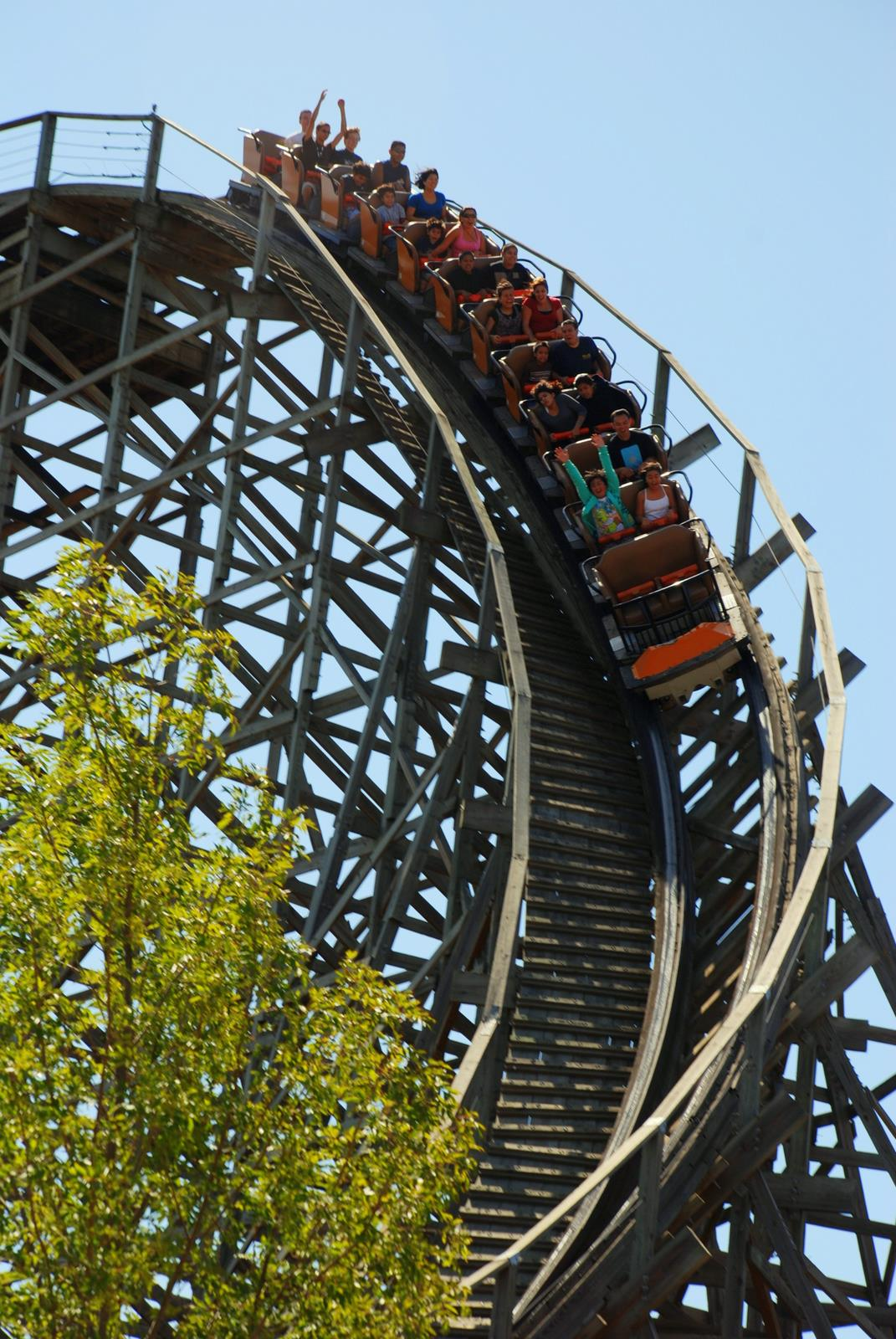
Roar in 2009

The table below compares the original Roar, with the updated Joker ride. The original ride by the Great Coasters International was an approximately 94 feet (29 m) tall and the length of 3,291 feet (1,003 m). The refurbished ride by Rocky Mountain Construction features a steeper and taller coaster, thus achieving a faster speed.

Statistic	Roar	The Joker
Years	1999–2015	2016
Manufacturer	Great Coasters International	Rocky Mountain Construction
Designer	Mike Boodley	Alan Schilke
Track	Wood	Steel
Height	94.6 ft or 28.8 m	100 ft or 30 m
Drop	85 ft or 26 m	95 ft or 28 meters
Length	3,291 ft or 1,003 m	3,200 ft or 980 m
Speed	50 mph or 80 km/h	53 mph or 85 km/h
Inversions	0	3
Max vertical angle	45°	78°
Trains	Great Coasters International	Rocky Mountain Construction

== Ride experience ==
The Joker's trains are themed to the character widely known in the Batman comics. Each train has six cars, each seating four people with two across in two rows, for a total capacity of 24 riders per train. As the train departs the station, it enters several small 'bunny hills' and turns, reminiscent of pre-lift elements on Twisted Colossus at Six Flags Magic Mountain. The train ascends up its first hill of 100 feet (30 m), followed by a curved drop at 78 degrees – re-profiled as a steeper drop from the original Roar coaster. It accelerates to a maximum speed of 53 mph (85 km/h) before entering the "step-up under-flip inverted roll" element.

After turning left out of the inversion, the train goes up a hill into a 180-degree stall featuring several head chopper beams. A wave turn element and several air time hills follow, along with an over-banked turn and an Asian camelback hill. The track winds sharply through another over-banked turn before entering the final inversion, a zero-g-roll. Finally, the train undergoes another banked turn and camelback hill before reaching the final brake run and returning to the station.
