= Six Flags Discovery Kingdom =

Zoological theme park in Vallejo, California

- Previously known as Marine World (1968–1970s); Marine World Africa USA (1970s–1997); The New Marine World Theme Park (1998); Six Flags Marine World (1999–2006)
- Logo used since 2025

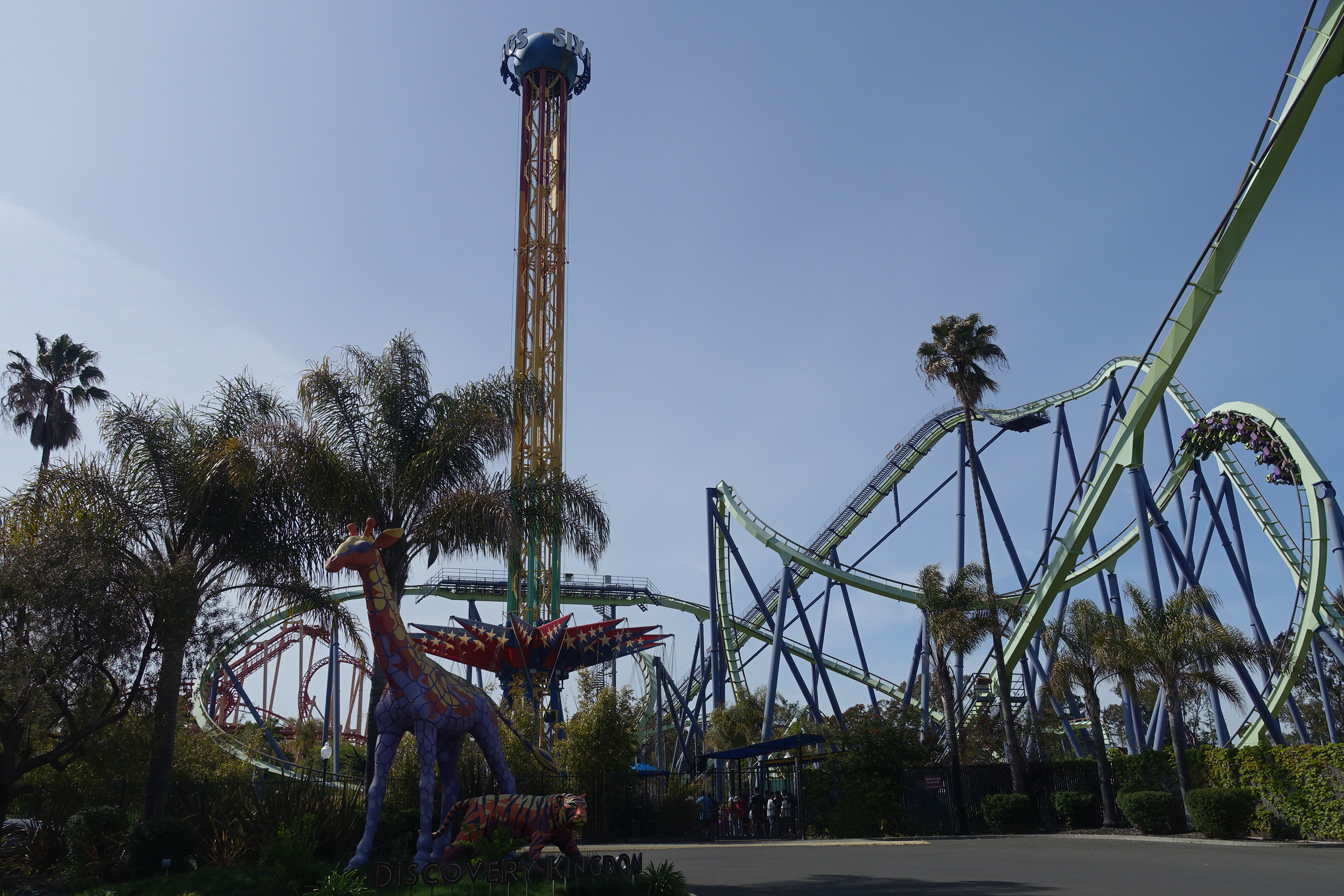
- SkyScreamer and Medusa in 2023
- Interactive map of Six Flags Discovery Kingdom
- Location: Vallejo, California, U.S.
- Coordinates: 38°8′16″N 122°13′48″W
- Status: Operating
- Opened: February 28, 1968
- Owner: Six Flags
- Slogan: America's Only Wildlife, Marine Life, and Thrill Ride Park
- Operating season: Year round
- Area: 135 acres (55 ha)

Attractions
- Total: 40
- Roller coasters: 10
- Water rides: 2
- Website: sixflags.com/discoverykingdom

Six Flags Discovery Kingdom (formerly known as Six Flags Marine World, Marine World, The New Marine World Theme Park, and Marine World Africa USA) is a 135-acre (55 ha) animal theme park located in Vallejo, California, off of Interstate 80 between San Francisco and Sacramento. The park includes a variety of roller coasters and other amusement rides. Six Flags Discovery Kingdom has been part of the Six Flags chain of amusement parks since 1999.

== Transportation and facilities ==
Daily public transportation to the park is provided by Amtrak Thruway's 7 Route to Martinez station, Evans Transportation also provides daily service between a Courtyard by Marriott hotel (located adjacent to the northeastern border of the park) and Oakland International Airport. Vallejo's local public transit provider SolTrans serves the park Monday through Saturday, connecting the park with Fairfield Transportation Center, Vallejo Station, and other points in Southern Solano County.

A 7.5 MW solar canopy shading the parking lot was installed in 2019, and provides 11.9 GWh of energy per year which is about 80% of the park's energy needs.

== History ==
=== Early operation ===
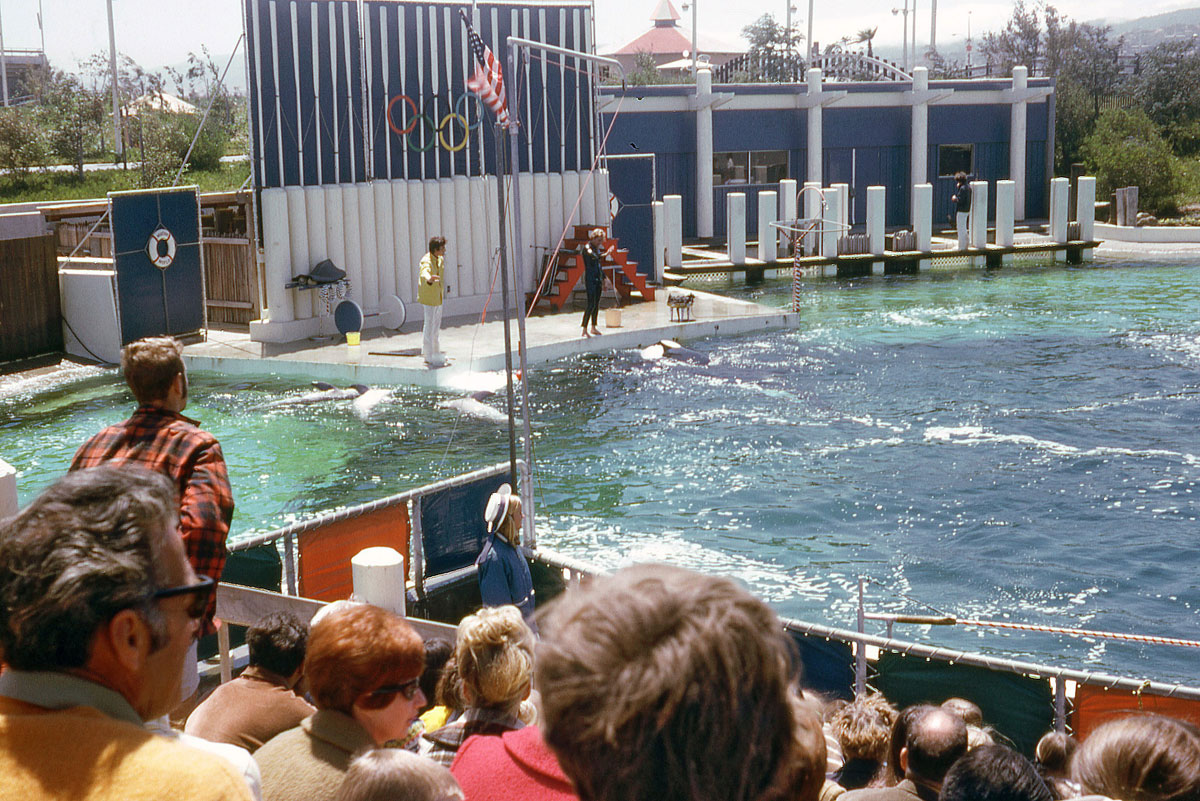
1970 orca show at the original Marine World in Redwood City

Six Flags Discovery Kingdom opened in 1968 as Marine World, a small zoo in Redwood City, California. In the mid-1970s, it merged with a failing land-animal park called Africa USA and became Marine World Africa USA. The park eventually moved to a new site in Vallejo, California, opening in 1986. The new Marine World opened to visitors in 1986 and remained under control of the non-profit Marine World Foundation. In March 1987, actor William Shatner raised money for the California Rare and Endangered Species Preservation Fund by riding an Orca at the park. The park defaulted on its debt to the city of Vallejo, after which the city took ownership in 1996.

=== Conversion to a theme park ===
Vallejo hired Premier Parks (now known as Six Flags Entertainment Corporation) to manage the property, upgrade it, and improve its attendance. Premier added some non-animal attractions, particularly amusement rides, to increase attendance. In 1997, the park added two major ride attractions: Popeye's Seaport and DinoSphere. Popeye's Seaport offered eleven children's attractions, including an interactive foam ball play structure and an interactive water play area. DinoSphere took the place of the park's Australian Walk-A-Bout attraction (also the former home of the Dinosaurs! attraction). DinoSphere was an Iwerks Turbo Theater, capable of seating 100 riders per showing. The theater played the Iwerks film Dino Island for its first season of operation. The theater has since changed films numerous times.

The number of amusement rides increased over the next few years, including the addition of several major roller coasters. In 1998, the park's name changed again to The New Marine World Theme Park. The 1998 season saw the addition of two major roller coasters: Kong and Boomerang: Coast to Coaster. Kong was relocated from Opryland Themepark after the park shut down in 1997, and opened at Marine World in May 1998. Other major additions that year included Hammerhead Shark, a Zamperla Prototype Hawk 48; VooDoo, A HUSS Top Spin; Monsoon Falls and White Water Safari, Intamin water attractions. DinoSphere also received a new ride film, Dino Island II: Escape from Dino Island, which featured improved special effects along with a new storyline.

=== Addition to the Six Flags chain ===
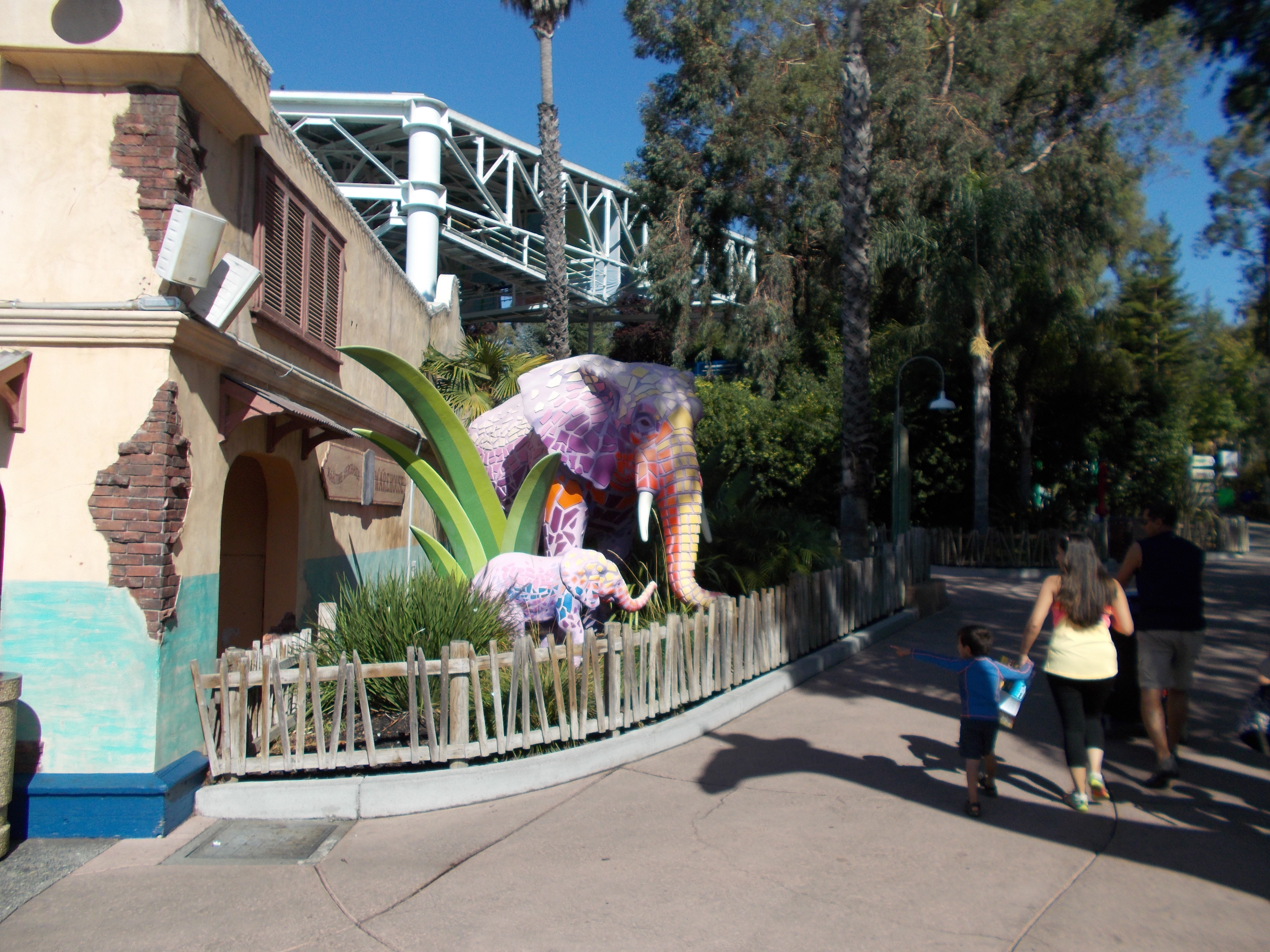
People walking at Six Flags in Vallejo

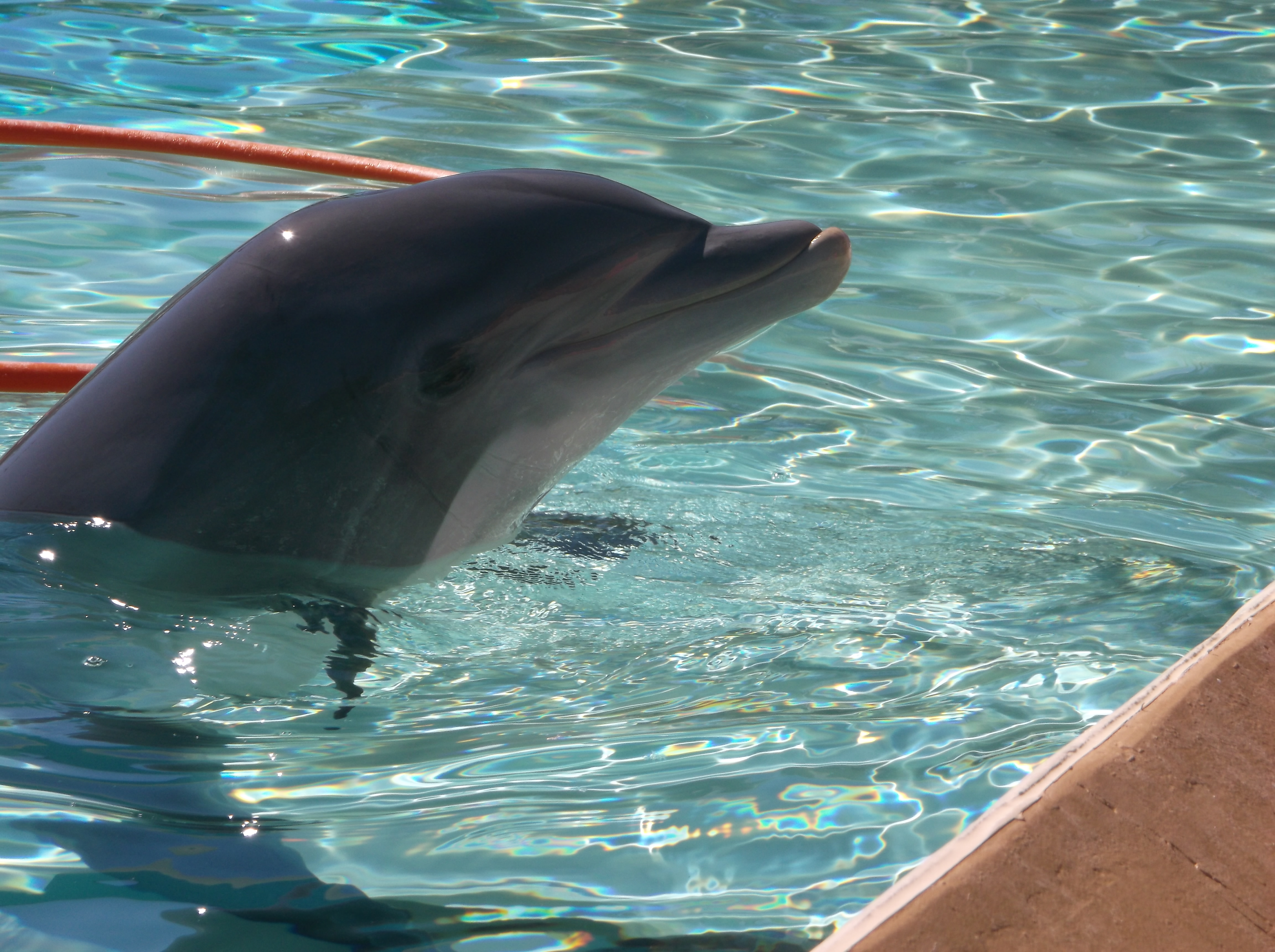
A dolphin swimming at Six Flags in Vallejo

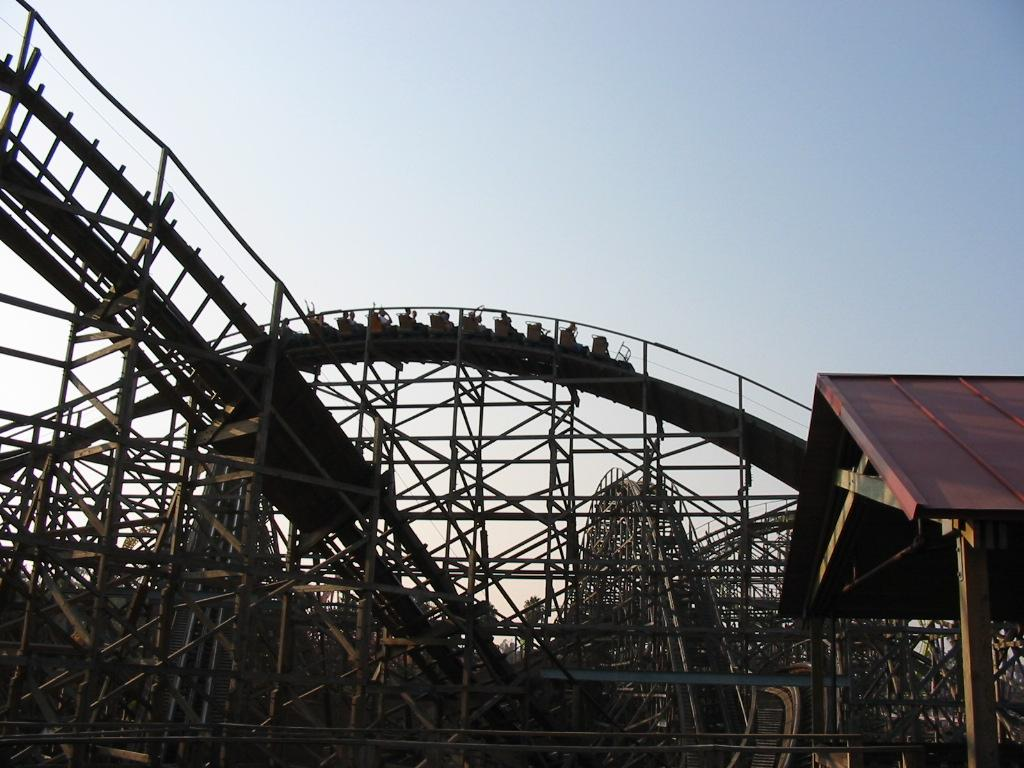
Roar: Discovery Kingdom's former Wooden Roller Coaster, now the Joker, an RMC hybrid

After the final operating day of the 1998 season, October 31, the park officially became Six Flags Marine World. The change in ownership brought many changes to the park, including the addition of Warner Bros.' Looney Tunes characters. The park also received the wooden roller coaster Roar. Built by Great Coasters International, Roar was the first coaster to feature Millennium Flyer trains. The 1999 season also saw the introduction of Tasmanian Devil, a Frisbee flat ride manufactured by HUSS, and Scat-A-Bout, a typical Scrambler flat ride. Although both rides opened in 1999, they were purchased by the park in 1998 but not constructed until 1999 due to construction timetables that prevented their opening in time for the start of the 1998 season. Popeye's Seaport was rebranded Looney Tunes Seaport and received the Roadrunner Express kiddie coaster.

In 2000, the park opened its fourth major roller coaster dubbed Medusa. Medusa was designed by Bolliger & Mabillard. Medusa lasts three minutes; starting with a 150-foot-tall (46 m) drop, it then executes a 128-foot-tall (39 m) vertical loop, a dive loop, a Zero-G roll, a sea serpent roll, and two corkscrews. Medusa is one of the park's most popular rides. With the addition of Medusa, the park also received the Cobra family coaster and built a new parking lot south of the park.

The park received its fifth major roller coaster in 2001, V2: Vertical Velocity. Built by Intamin, the ride was the first Spiraling Impulse Coaster on the west coast and took the record for being the tallest and fastest coaster in northern California. The ride was plagued with technical issues when it opened, which resulted in extensive down time. The park also eventually turned off the LIM motor on the back tower that held the train in position for a few seconds on its second trip up the tower. During the same time, the park also added the Warrior of the Dawn film to the DinoSphere.

In 2002, due to local building restrictions, the height limit on all roller coasters at the park is 150 feet (46 m), while V2: Vertical Velocity exceeded that limit by about 36 feet (11 m). Thus, they lowered the coaster's reverse tower 36 feet (11 m) and turned the forward tower into a 45° angle with an incline heartline roll that spiraled over the park's main entrance; Vertical Velocity is the only Impulse Coaster to do this. The park re-activated the LIM motor on the reverse tower in the 2002 season; however, the motor failed to hold the train completely in place and slipped significantly. The motor was eventually turned off again in the 2003 season. The park also began to show 7th Portal, a 3D comic book film by Stan Lee, in the DinoSphere Theater during this season.

The park added its sixth major roller coaster, Zonga, in 2003. Designed by Anton Schwarzkopf, the ride was relocated from Six Flags Astroworld and received major track modification by Premier Rides before it opened at Marine World. Zonga opened in late April with a sporadic operation. The ride was often closed because of mechanical problems, and when it did operate, it often closed for short periods of time due to ride errors. Eventually the park delayed its opening to 12 noon every day, completely blocking the ride plaza to park guests. Zonga's last season of operation was 2004; it then sat dormant until it was removed in 2006 and placed in the parking lot for storage. By the beginning of the 2007 season, Zonga was removed from the parking lot. It is now operating at the San Marcos National Fair in Mexico. The park also began showing Stargate SG3000 in its Iwerks 3D Turbo Theater, which finally received new branding and was no longer called DinoSphere.

On October 30, 2004, an accident on nearby I-80 caused power to go out in the park, resulting in several dozen riders getting stranded on roller coasters. No injuries were reported, but the park did close several hours early.

In 2006, Tava's Jungleland opened, a children's area located in the back of the park near the main land animal displays featuring nine new wild animal displays.

=== Rebranding to Discovery Kingdom ===
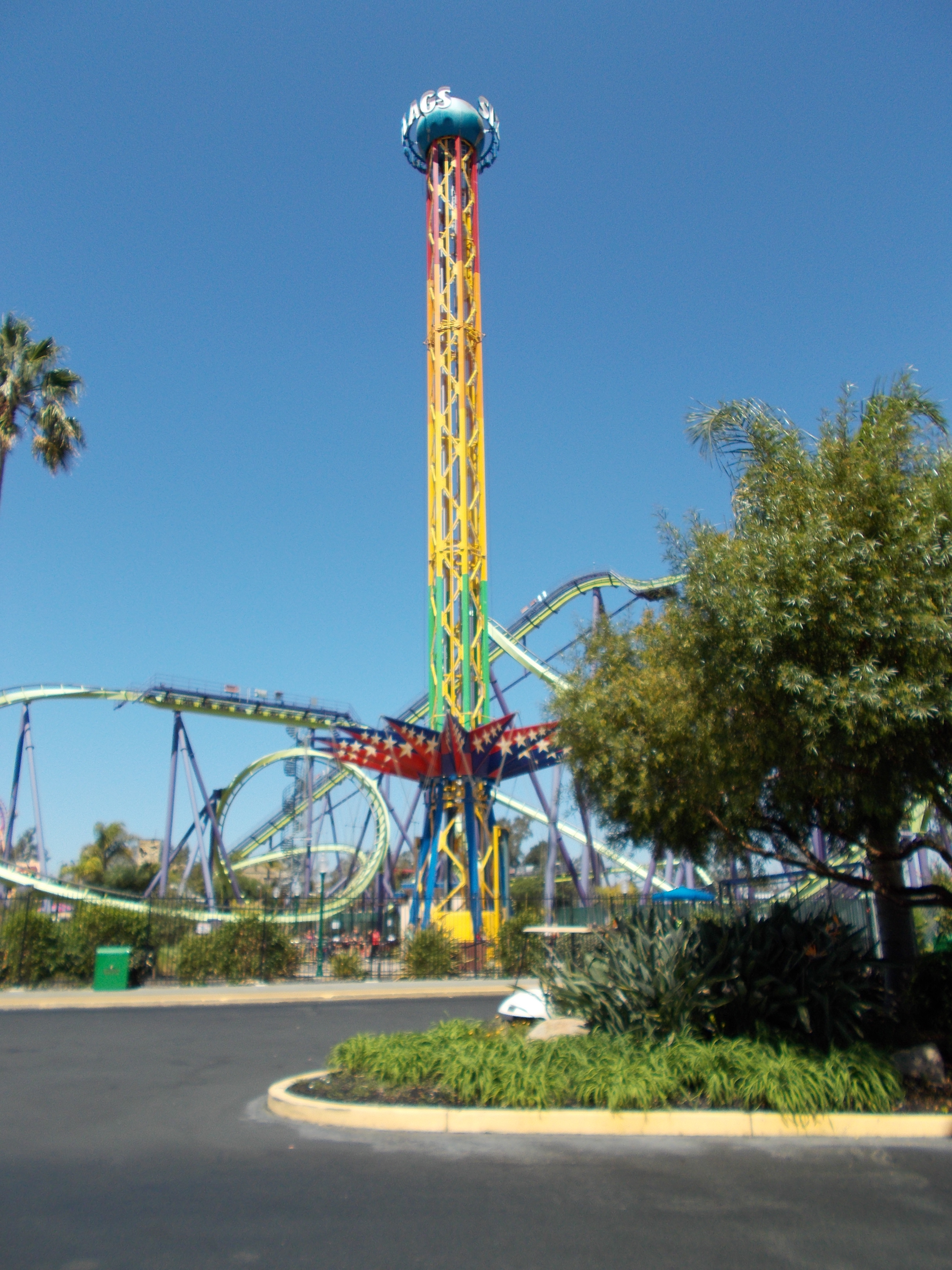
The tower at Six Flags in Vallejo

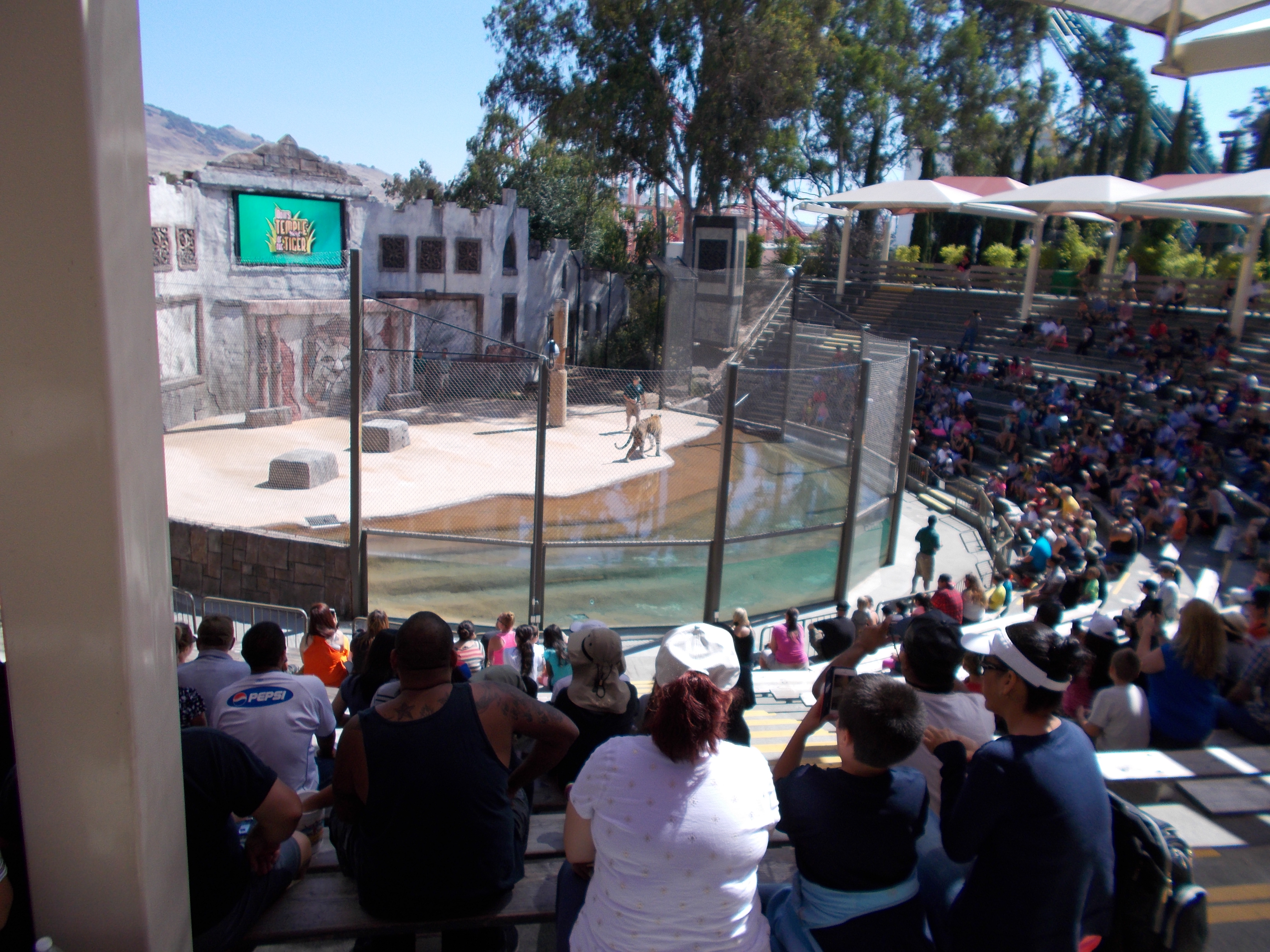
People watching a show at Six Flags in Vallejo, California

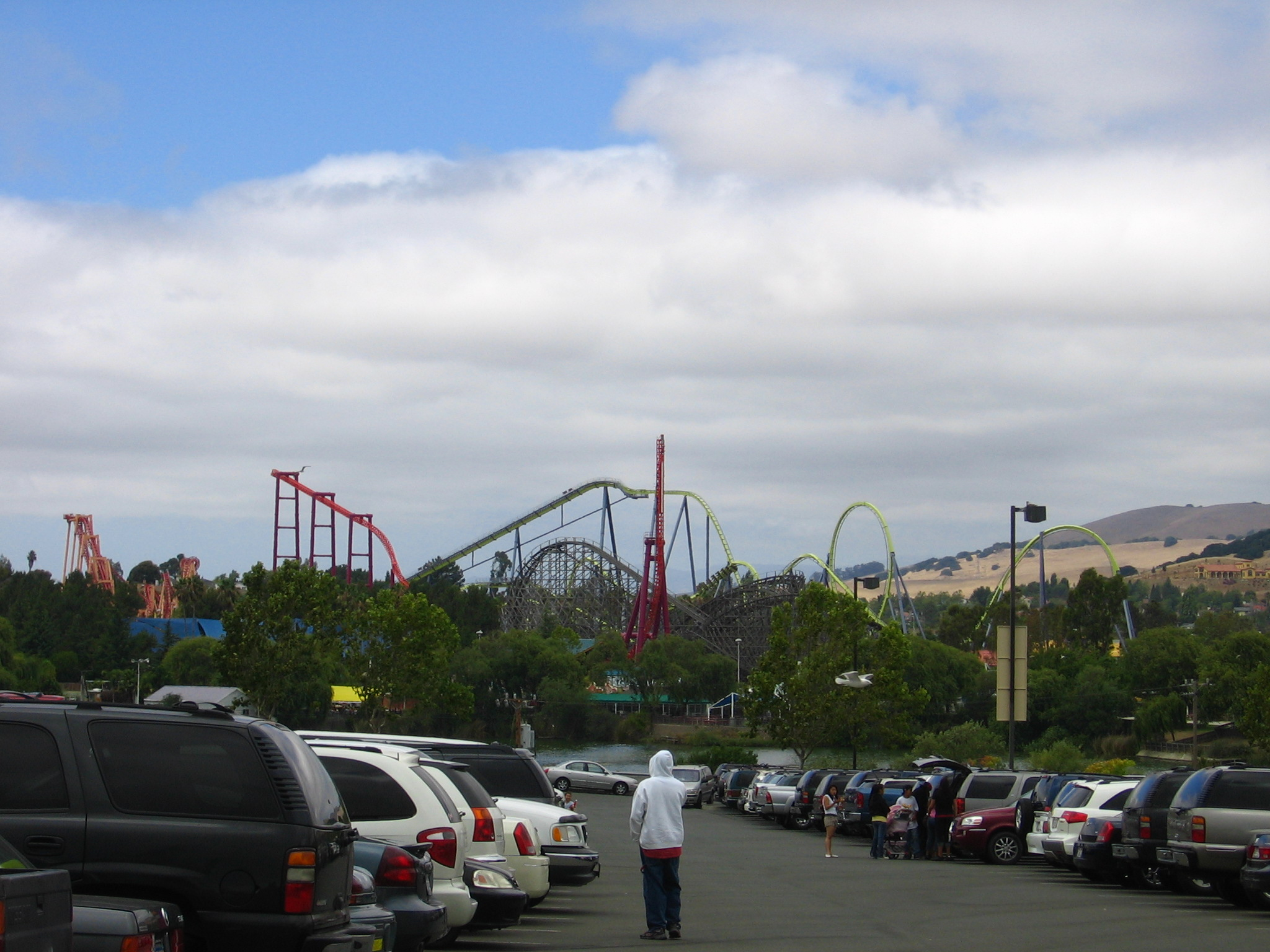
Discovery Kingdom, seen from the parking lot

On January 17, 2007, the park announced its new name: Six Flags Discovery Kingdom. The new name reflects the image of an animal park, a thrill-ride park, and a marine park. The park was separated into different themed areas: Land (exotic land animals), Sea (marine mammals) and Sky (roller coasters). US$16 million was spent on modifications including new heavy duty titanium bars in the animal cages, new shows, and converting the 3D theater into a "4D" theater. The park also added a Thomas the Tank Engine-themed children's area called Thomas Town, which opened June 20, 2007.

On June 5, 2007, Six Flags Parks confirmed media reports that Six Flags would exercise their option to buy the park.

In 2008, the park closed the IWerks 3D Turbo Theater due to escalating repair costs on the out-of-date operating system and hardware. The park received its eighth roller coaster named Tony Hawk's Big Spin, which was located on the former Zonga concrete pad. The ride featured a unique layout compared to the three other coasters which share the name, including a base frame instead of permanent concrete footers and a higher top speed. Tony Hawk's Big Spin opened on May 23, 2008. That same year, the park completed its longest operating season offering "Holiday in the Park" through the first week of January.

In 2009, Discovery Kingdom introduced the all-new Odin's Temple of the Tiger. The new tiger show features a diving white tiger named Odin. Discovery Kingdom also initially acquired two new Bengal tiger cubs, Nalin and Akasha.

In 2011 to 2022, Discovery Kingdom introduced the all-new Merlin's Dolphin Show. The new dolphin show features a diving gray dolphin named Squeaky. Discovery Kingdom also initially acquired two new striped dolphins, Rascal and Umiko. The holiday events are Fright Fest and Holiday In The Park tonight!

In late 2010, Six Flags Parks began the process of removing licensed themes from attractions. They terminated several licenses including those with Thomas the Tank Engine and Tony Hawk. Tony Hawk's Big Spin was renamed and re-themed to Big Spin, then Pandemonium. Big Spin was later removed and replaced with Superman: Ultimate Flight opening in 2012. Thomas Town was renamed and re-themed as Seaside Junction in time for the 2011 season. For the 2011 season, the park introduced the SkyScreamer. The swing ride is 150 feet (46 m) high and soars in a 98-foot (30 m) circle at speeds over 43 miles per hour (69 km/h). The ride opened on May 27, 2011.

In 2012, the park added a steel Premier Rides roller coaster called Superman: Ultimate Flight. It is the tallest roller coaster inversion west of the Mississippi River, measuring 150 feet (46 m) in height. It includes "two upside down twists and two vertical rolls over a track length of 863 feet (263 m)". In some places, riders traverse speeds of 62 miles per hour (100 km/h).

The park added Cirque Dreams for the 2013 season; the show was held seasonally in the Dolphin Theater area. This show combined acrobats and aerialists performing alongside or above dolphins.

In 2014, Six Flags Discovery Kingdom held a press event for the new Tsunami Soaker water ride, during which the park announced a May 31, 2014 opening to the general public. On August 28, 2014, Discovery Kingdom announced the new Dare Devil Chaos Coaster flat ride for the 2015 season. It is a standard 22M Larson Superloop pendulum flat ride that rocks riders back and forth inside a 360 degree loop. It opened to the public on May 23, 2015. On July 16, 2015, the park announced that Roar would close on August 16, 2015.

On September 3, 2015, the park announced their tenth major thrill coaster, The Joker, which is a hybrid transformation of Roar. The conversion was performed by Rocky Mountain Construction. The coaster features a 100-foot height, a 78-degree drop, and three inversions including the world's first step-up under flip inverted roll.

In February 2016, the park opened Pacific Rim 5-D, an in-theater, special effects 3D movie, on a limited and trial-run basis. The experience is based on the Warner Bros. Pictures' and Legendary Pictures' sci-fi movie Pacific Rim. Guests watch part of the movie wearing 3D glasses while sitting in seats that move, shake and bounce in response to the action on the movie screen.

In April 2017, Six Flags entered into an agreement with the owner of Waterworld California in nearby Concord, to operate the water park, which was formerly owned by Six Flags. As of 2018, the water park was renamed to Six Flags Hurricane Harbor Concord.

=== Seasonal events ===
Each fall, Discovery Kingdom opens Fright Fest for Halloween, consisting of six haunted houses, scare zones, and many ghouls that are added throughout the park. Tinseltown Terror haunted house is located in the park's bumper car ride and the Brutal Planet haunted house is located in the Roar plaza. The scare zone is located between Ocean Discovery and the entry plaza, where cockroach eating contests are held. In 2007, Discovery Kingdom introduced the Wheel of Fright and the Coffin of Fear for Fright Fest. 2007 also brought the addition of the Kamp Khaos haunted house, replacing Brutal Planet. Kamp Khaos was placed inside the Monsoon Falls water ride lagoon.

The other major seasonal event, Holiday in the Park, made its debut November 23, 2007. The event features Santa Claus, holiday-themed shows, and other seasonal items. That year, Discovery Kingdom also featured the world's largest Christmas tree as part of the celebration. The tree was 125 feet (38 m) tall and had a diameter of 4 feet (1.2 m). Due to its size, a Chinook helicopter was needed to set it into place.

== Rides and attractions ==
=== Roller coasters ===
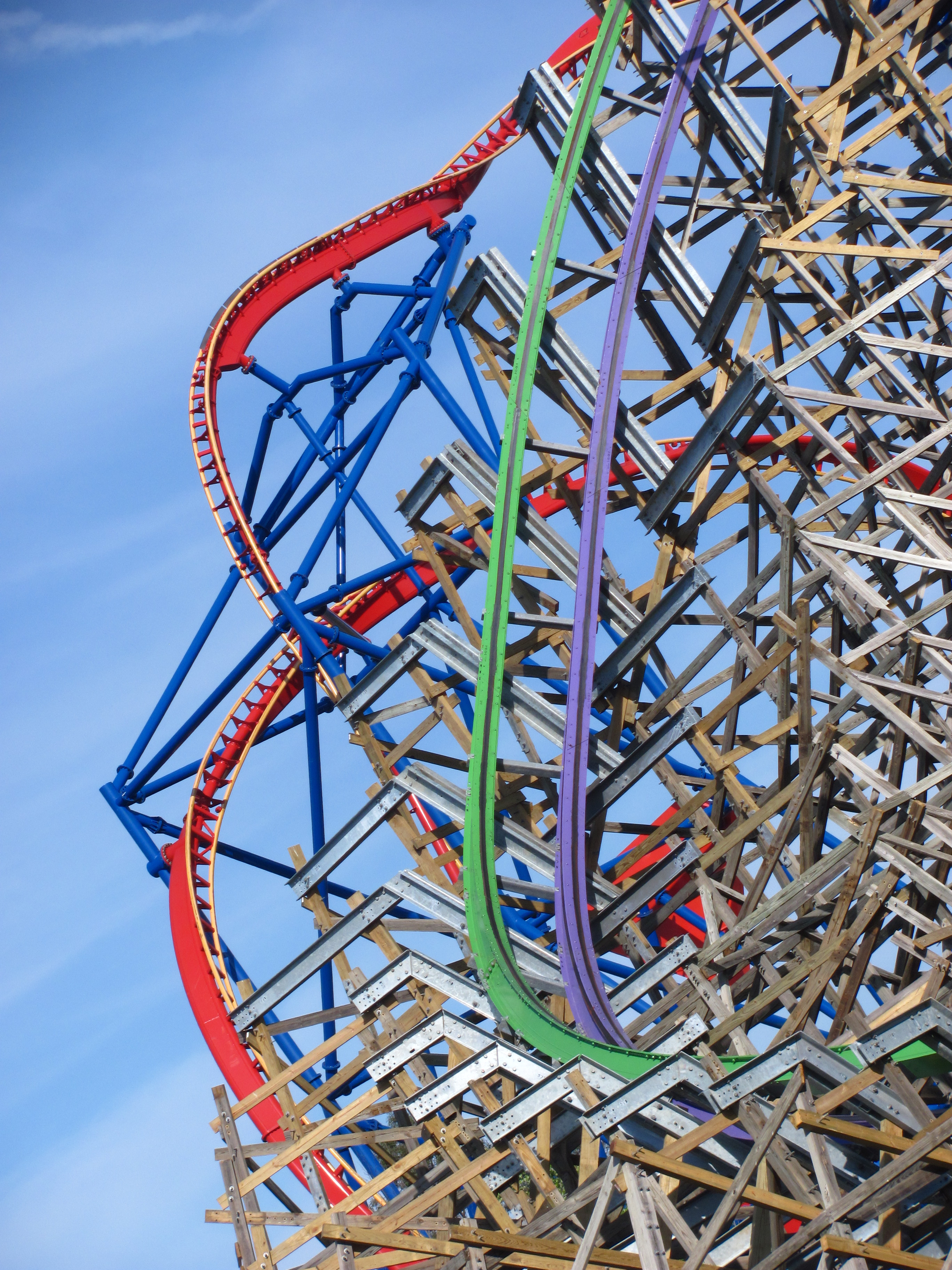
Superman: Ultimate Flight and The Joker

Name	Manufacturer	Opened	Model name	Location
Batman: The Ride	S&S Worldwide	2019	4-D Free Spin	DC Universe
Boomerang: Coast to Coaster	Vekoma	1998	Boomerang	Land
Cobra	Zierer	2000	Tivoli - Large	Sky
The Flash: Vertical Velocity	Intamin	2001	Twisted Impulse Coaster	DC Universe
The Joker	Rocky Mountain Construction	2016	I-Box - Custom	DC Universe
Kong	Vekoma	1998	SLC (689m Standard)	Sky
Medusa	Bolliger & Mabillard	2000	Floorless Coaster	Sky
Roadrunner Express	Zamperla	1999	Family Gravity Coaster 80STD	Looney Tunes Seaport
Sidewinder Safari	Zamperla	2022	Spinning Coaster	Land
Superman: Ultimate Flight	Premier Rides	2012	Sky Rocket II	DC Universe

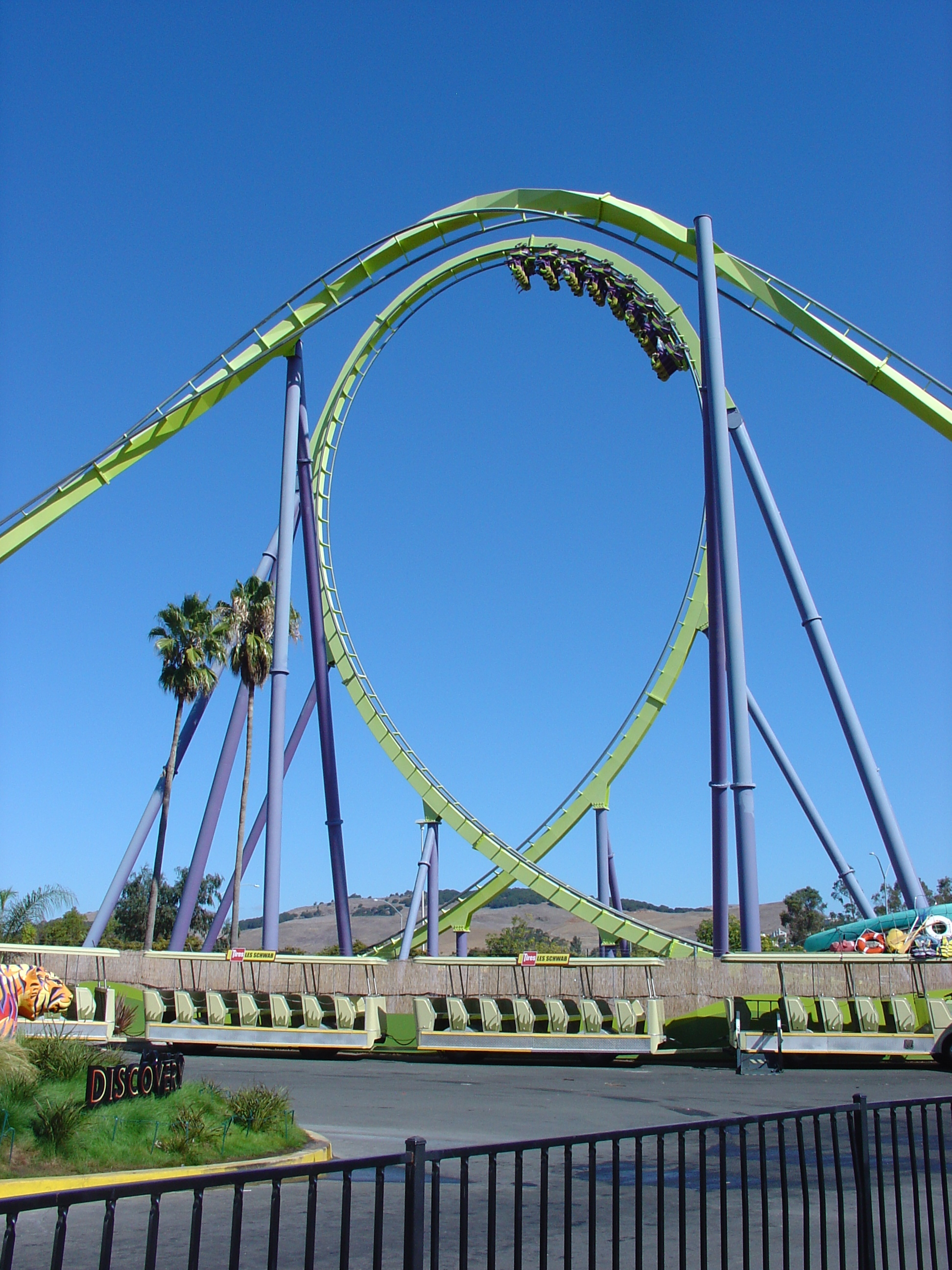
Medusa in 2007

=== Thrill rides ===
Name	Manufacturer	Opened	Type	Location
SkyScreamer	Funtime	2011	Star Flyer	Sky
Wonder Woman: Lasso of Truth	Zamperla	2017	Giant Discovery	DC Universe

=== Family rides ===
Name	Manufacturer	Opened	Type	Location
The Ark	Zamperla	1998	Swinging Ship	Land
Boardwalk Bumper Buggies	C & S (Floor) and Ninja (Cars)	1998	Bumper cars	Sky
Monkey Business	Zamperla	1998	Teacups	Land
Scat-A-Bout	Eli Bridge	1999	Scrambler	Sky
Thrilla Gorilla	Zamperla	1998	Caterpillar	Land
Wave Swinger	Zamperla	1998	Wave Swinger	Sky

=== Water rides ===
Name	Manufacturer	Opened	Type	Location
Monsoon Falls	Intamin	1999	Spillwater water ride	Sky
White Water Safari	Intamin	1999	River Rapids	Land

=== Children’s rides ===
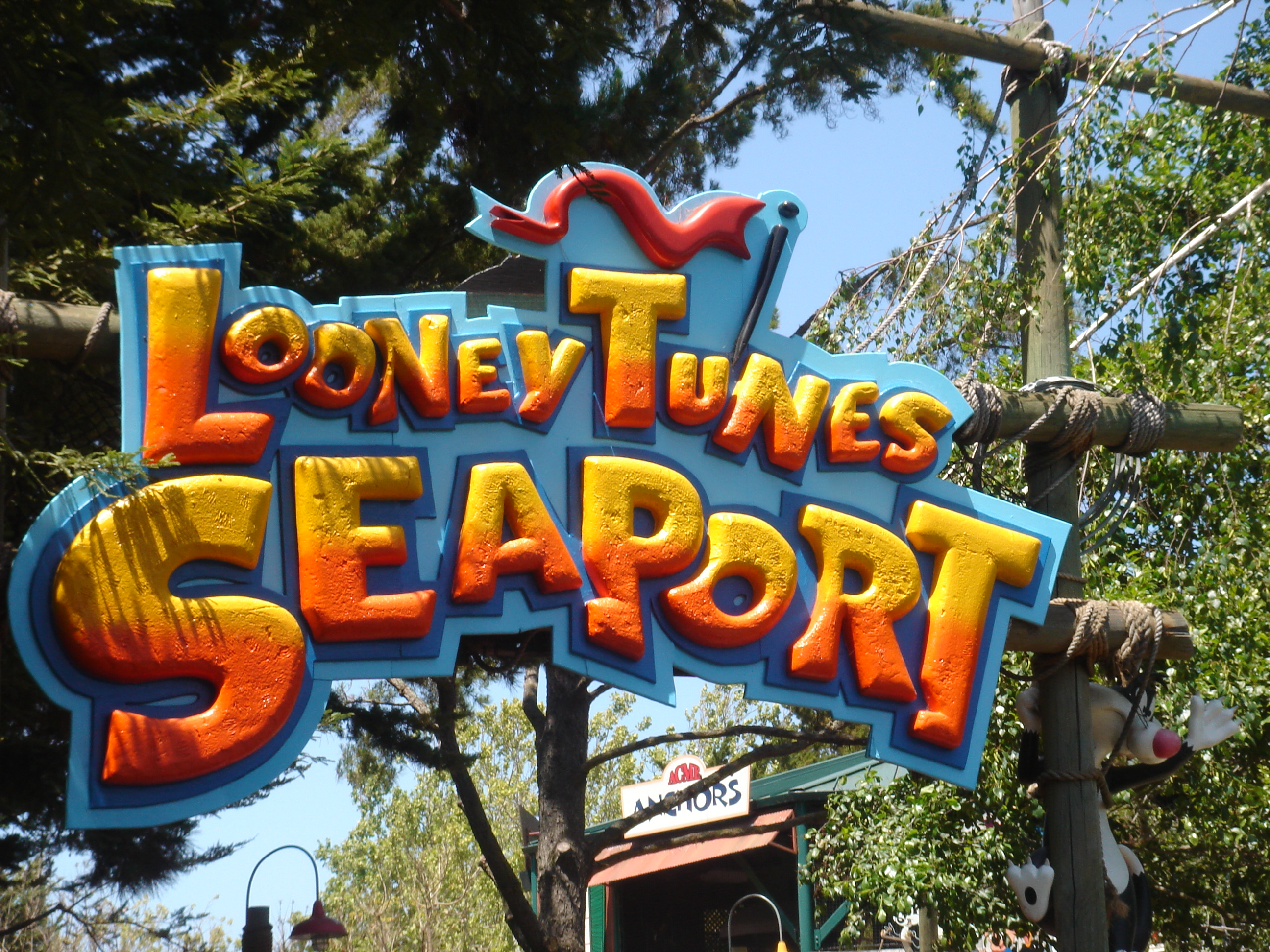
Looney Tunes Seaport

Looney Tunes Seaport (formerly Popeye's Seaport from 1997 through 1998)

- Acme Fun Factory – A large indoor play structure where children and their parents can shoot foam balls at targets or each other; opened in 1997.
- Pepe Le Pew's Rafts of Romance – Small tea cup ride; opened in 1997.
- Elmer's Weather Balloons (Zamperla Samba Balloons)- A circular ride where kids can spin their cars while the ride changes elevation; opened in 1997.
- Sylvester's Pounce and Bounce (Zamperla Jumpin' Star) – A children's drop ride; opened in 1999.
- Bugs Buccaneer (Sartori kiddie swinging ship); opened in 1999.
- Taz's Typhoon (Zamperla Lolly Swing) – A children's version of the swing ride; opened in 1997.
- Daffy's Deep Sea Dive (Zamperla Crazy Sub) – A yellow submarine where kids and parents experience quick ascents and sudden drops; opened in 1997.
- Foghorn Leghorn's Seaport Railway (Zamperla Rio Grande) – Train ride; opened in 1997.
- Yosemite Sam's Flight School – Small planes where children control how high they go; opened in 1997.
- Seaport Carousel – A small merry-go-round Chance Morgan carousel with exotic animals; opened in 1997.

Tava's Jungleland (all rides opened in 2006)

- Tava's Elephant Parade – A circular ride where children board small elephants and control their height.
- Congo Queen (Zamperla Rockin' Tug) – A large Tugboat that rocks and spins.
- Safari Jeep Tours – Riders board small Jeeps and traverse a track through animal attractions.
- Nairobi's Lookout Balloons (Zamperla Samba Tower) – Riders board 4-person gondolas and are taken to heights of 35 feet (11 m). Riders are able to spin themselves, which allows the observation tower to become a high speed ride.
- Frog Hopper – A circular ride with "hopping" cars.
- Monkey Around (Zamperla Swing Ride) – A swing ride that offers no changes in elevation.
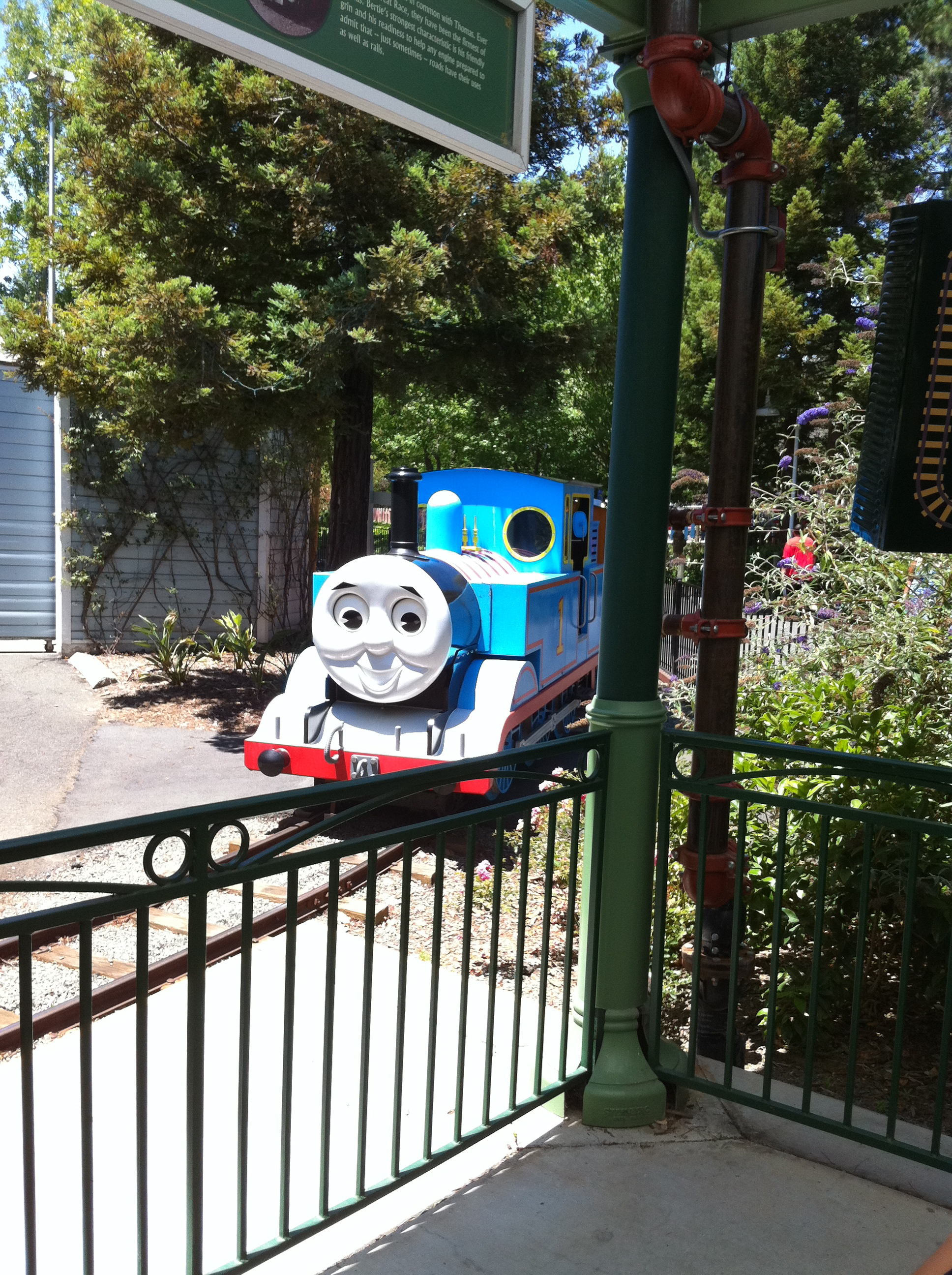
  The former Thomas the Tank Engine in 2010
- Zoe's Tree House (SCS Interactive “Treehouse”) – A large outdoor play structure with slides and look out towers.

Seaside Junction (all rides opened in 2007 in the former Thomas Town)

All rides were re-themed to "Seaside Junction" in time for the 2011 season.

- Air Penguins (I.E. Park Mini Flight) – A circular ride where children board small helicopters and control their height. It was known as Harold the Helicopter from 2007–2010 in Thomas Town; and re-themed in 2011.
- Merlin’s Seaside Tours (I.E. Park Unknown Model Name) – It was known as Bertie the Bus from 2007–2010 in Thomas Town and re-themed in 2011.
- Seaside Railway – Train ride around the Shark Experience passing: Tidmouth Shed, Lake Hackenbeck, Hackenbeck Station. It was known as Thomas the Tank Engine from 2007–2010 in Thomas Town and re-themed in 2011. Riders used to board into Thomas' coaches Annie and Clarabel. The engine still has Thomas' whistle.

=== Upcharge attractions ===
- Rockwall Climbing Challenge – Riders climb a 45 ft (14 m) rock wall.

=== Animal attractions ===
- Shark Experience – Guest gets to go "underwater" with sharks as they travel on a moving walkway through an underwater tunnel showing various sharks. Species on display include sandbar sharks, zebra sharks, and nurse sharks.
- Jocko's Walrus Experience – Guest can get face to face with the park's walrus. Walrus training sessions may also be scheduled throughout the day. Featured in the film 50 First Dates.
- Stingray Bay – Located in Ocean Discovery, guests can touch live southern stingrays.
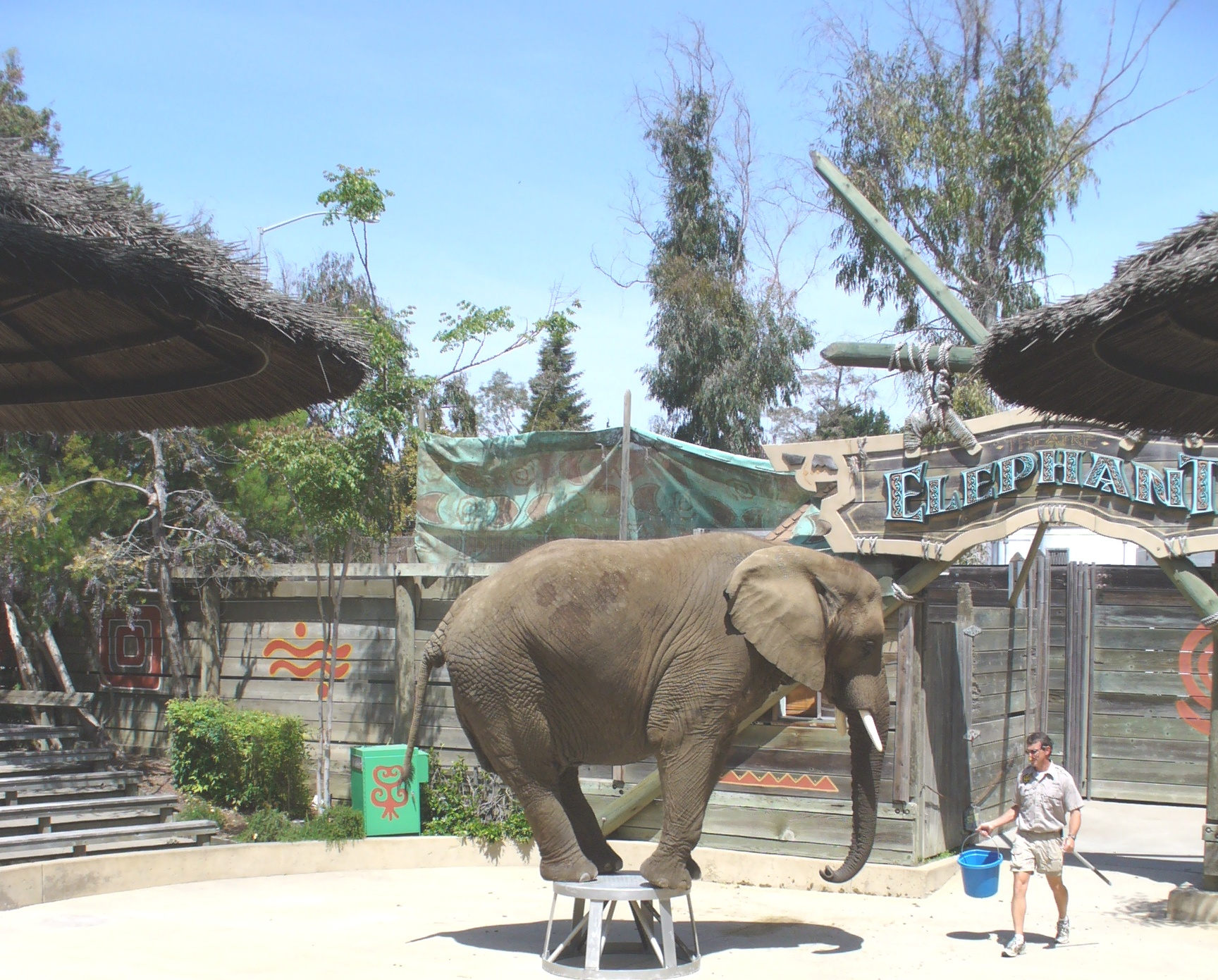
- An elephant show at the park
  Penguin Passage – Located in Ocean Discovery, guests can come face to face with African penguins.
- Seal Cove – Located in Ocean Discovery, guests can feed California sea lions and Pacific harbor seals.
- Alligator Isle – An exhibit featuring American alligators.
- Butterfly Habitat – Guests enter a large, glass-enclosed butterfly garden filled with exotic butterflies.
- Cougar Rocks – Guests can get up close to the park's four cougars.
- Odin's Tiger Island – Home of the park's endangered Bengal and Amur tigers.
- Giraffe Encounter – Guests can get up close and feed the giraffes.
- Lion's Den – African lion exhibit.
- Dolphin Harbor – Educational dolphin demonstration presentation.
- Sea Lion Stadium – Located in Ocean Discovery, home of the park's California sea lion, Pacific harbor seal, and Asian small-clawed otter show.
- Toyota Stadium - The park's main dolphin show venue; guests can also get up close to the bottlenose dolphins at the viewing windows behind the stadium. Toyota is the sponsor of this display.
- Odin's Temple of the Tiger – Home to the Odin's Temple of the Tiger Show, a large amphitheater for guests to view the show. A small exhibit for viewing the tigers is located outside the stadium.
- Animal Nursery – Home to baby animals and animals with special needs.
- Reptile Discovery - Located in Tava's Jungleland, guests can view various reptile species.

=== Past rides and attractions ===
- Starfish – A circular Chance Trabant ride located near Ski Stadium. The ride was removed after two accidents sent people to the hospital after being thrown from the ride. The ride area is now the Air Penguins ride in Seaside Junction.
- Shoreline Express – The park's train system that transported guests from Shark Experience to Animal Adventure near Jambo. Shoreline Express was removed before the 2006 season to make room for Tava's Jungleland and the newly remodeled Lakeside Pavilion. A small area of track surrounding Shark Experience is currently being used for Seaside Railway.
- Zonga – Built in 2003, this coaster was originally named Thriller and traveled Europe, as it was built by Anton Schwarzkopf. For a short time, it also operated as Texas Tornado at Six Flags Astroworld. Zonga operated for two years at the park. The ride regularly opened about two hours after the park and had frequent breakdowns, which contributed to closing the ride. The ride stood silent for the 2005 season and was moved to the Discovery Kingdom parking lot where it sat throughout the 2006 season, leaving a large empty concrete area at the front of the park. In early 2007 the ride was shipped off to a park in Mexico after being purchased.
- Jambo – One of the first Zamperla Joker rides to be installed in the US. The ride opened in 1998 in the rear of the park near VooDoo. The ride operated for the beginning of the 2006 season, but shut down before summer operation. Shortly after, all rides of the same model in the Six Flags chain shut down, and none have reopened. Jambo was removed in the winter before the 2007 season as well as its sister ride, Trailblazer, at Six Flags Great America.
- 'Round the World Ferris Wheel – A Ferris wheel with balloon gondolas; opened in 1998. In 2007 the ride was removed to make way for the new children's area.
- Turbo Bungee – Riders are harnessed to bungee cords and jump on a trampoline reaching heights where they are capable of front and back flips. Price was $7 per person for 2 minutes.
- iWerks 4D Theater – The theater has been known as DinoSphere, Stargate, or iWerks Turbo Theater although it played seven different films in its time. This was the original thrill ride to be built at the park; opened in 1997 as a 3D theater, it was updated for the 2007 season to include 4D effects which include water sprayers, seat vibrators and bubbles. The theater did not open for the 2008 season due to high maintenance costs. Both the Iwerks 4D theater and its original Dino Island show reopened for the park's 2018 season. However, as of 2019, the Dino Island show was changed to Happy Feet, then shut down indefinitely. It may have been shut down permanently because it has been removed from the park's website.
- Safari River Journey – A small children's boat ride that was closed due to lack of ridership. Located in Tava's Jungleland.
- Pandemonium – Opened on May 23, 2008, as Tony Hawk's Big Spin, renamed to Big Spin in late 2010 and then Pandemonium in early 2011. This spinning coaster originally themed to the skateboarder Tony Hawk takes riders in four-passenger "skateboards" and spins them through over 1,300 ft (400 m) of track at 31 mph (50 km/h). Pandemonium has also been awarded by the National Six Flags Corporation as the friendliest and cleanest of them all. It closed on January 1, 2012, to make room for Superman: Ultimate Flight and was relocated to Six Flags México as The Joker, which opened in 2013.
- Shouka Stadium – Home of the park's orca named Shouka. Guests could view Shouka at the viewing windows in the back of the stadium in between shows. Also was home to Merlin and Cupid, Atlantic bottlenose dolphins. It occasionally served as temporary homes the park's other bottlenose dolphins over the years. The stadium is currently on the map as Toyota Stadium featuring the dolphin show DRENCH.
- Acme Water Works – A large interactive water play structure; opened in 1997. Closed in 2013.
- Wave Jumper – A circular ride where riders board orca-shaped gondolas and rise into the air approximately 15 ft (4.6 m); opened in 1999 and was removed in 2013 for Tsunami Soaker.
- Roar - A Great Coasters International wooden coaster. It opened on May 14, 1999, and closed on August 16, 2015. The ride was re-themed and reopened with a new steel track as The Joker in May 2016.
- VooDoo - A Huss Top Spin (ride) that inverted riders multiple times on a horizontal axis. Believed to have closed during the 2017 season, due to extensive maintenance costs.
- TRS: Thunder Road Speedway – A high-speed go-kart track near The Joker. Ride duration was 7 minutes. It was closed and demolished in November 2018 to make way for Batman: The Ride.
- Harley Quinn Crazy Coaster - A unique Skyline Attractions Skywarp roller coaster that opened in 2018. Removed after only 2 seasons of staggered operation due to excessive downtime and maintenance costs.
- Sky Coaster - An upcharge Skycoaster attraction that was removed in 2021.
- Tasmanian Devil - A Huss Frisbee ride that was closed in 2017 for refurbishment, but never reopened and was demolished in 2021.
- Hammerhead Shark - First Hawk 48 from Zamperla. Opened in 1998, Demolished in 2022.
- Dare Devil Chaos Coaster - Larson Super Loop ride. Opened in 2015, Demolished in 2022.
- The Penguin - A Mack Rides Twist 'n' Splash ride. Opened in 2014, Demolished in 2023.

== Fast Lane ==
Fast Lane is an expedited queuing system that offers shorter waiting times on Six Flags Discovery Kingdom's popular attractions. Guests pay an additional fee in order to enter a secondary queue separate of the standard queue. It was introduced in 2026 and replaced The Flash Pass. As of January 2026, Fast Lane is offered on 17 attractions.
