= Beauty contest (disambiguation) =

A beauty pageant, also known as a beauty contest, is a competition based mainly on the physical beauty of its contestants.

Beauty contest or beauty pageant may also refer to:

- Keynesian beauty contest, a concept in economics and game theory
- "Beauty Contest" (song), by No Doubt
- "Beauty Contest" (Dawson's Creek), a 1998 television episode
- "Beauty Contest" (Rugrats), a segment from a 1991 television episode
- "Beauty Pageant" (Parks and Recreation), a 2009 television episode
