= Christina Vidal =

American actress and singer

- Other name: Christina Vidal Mitchell
- Occupations: Actress; singer
- Years active: 1993–present
- Spouse: Marcus Mitchell (m. 2016)
- Children: 3
- Relatives: Lisa Vidal (sister)

Christina Vidal Mitchell is an American actress and singer. On television, she is known for starring in the sitcoms Nick Freno: Licensed Teacher (1997–1998), Taina (2001–2002), and Primo (2023). Her film appearances include the comedy Life with Mikey (1993), the sports drama Brink! (1998), the fantasy comedies Freaky Friday (2003) and its sequel Freakier Friday (2025), and the slasher See No Evil (2006).

== Early life and education ==
Vidal is Puerto Rican. She attended LaGuardia High School. When she was 17 in 1998, she joined a girl group called Gemstone (along with Jade Villalon and Crystal Grant). Vidal later moved to Orlando, Florida, to proceed with the filming of Taina. Her sisters Lisa and Tanya are also actresses and have appeared on TV and in theatre; she also has a brother, Christian.

== Career ==
=== Acting ===
Vidal's first acting role was in the film Life with Mikey (1993) as "Angie Vega", becoming the first Puerto Rican child actress to play a lead in an American film. Though film critic Roger Ebert negatively reviewed the film, he wrote, "What makes the movie watchable is Christina Vidal's performance. She's a bright, no-nonsense type who plants her feet and delivers her lines and looks Fox square in the eye."

Vidal portrayed Taina Maria Morales in the Nickelodeon sitcom Taina, which ran for two seasons in 2001 and 2002. The next year, she played Maddie in the film Freaky Friday alongside Lindsay Lohan and appeared in the short-lived ABC action TV series 10-8: Officers on Duty. Also in 2003, she guest-starred in Sabrina the Teenage Witch as Paris Fate.

In 2006, she starred in the film See No Evil and also had a brief stint on the hit sitcom Girlfriends. She has made cameo appearances in the films I Think I Love My Wife, Mask of the Ninja, and the Internet comedy short "Love Automatically". In 2009, Vidal played a supporting character in the film Magic Man.

In 2025, Vidal reprised her role of Maddie in the Freaky Friday sequel film Freakier Friday.

=== Music ===
When Vidal was in the band Gemstone, she recorded songs with herself as well as bandmates Jade Villalon and Crystal Celeste Grant performing vocals. A few of these tracks would surface many years later on albums consisting of demos, rare tracks, and special songs of Villalon's music project, Sweetbox.

In 2002, she was briefly signed to MCA Records and in that time she was supposed to release her first single "Tropical" and her solo debut album White in the summer of 2002, but never did. She was also presented with the opportunity to be the lead singer for The Pussycat Dolls, however she was uninterested with the groups image. That same year she provided guest vocals on the remix of Will Smith's summer hit "Black Suits Comin' (Nod Ya Head)" from the Men in Black II soundtrack.

Vidal was a part of Lupe Fiasco's 1st & 15th Entertainment. She also recorded a track for the workout CD called Byou from Sabrina Bryan of The Cheetah Girls. The song she recorded was "Anything Is Possible". She also sang the song "Take Me Away" in the film Freaky Friday, and rerecorded it for Freakier Friday.

== Personal life ==
In 2016, Vidal married actor Marcus Mitchell, together they have three children.

== Filmography ==
=== Film ===
Year	Title	Role	Notes
1993	Life with Mikey	Angie Vega	
1995	Welcome to the Dollhouse	Cynthia	
2000	Details	Maggie	Short film
2003	Chasing Papi	Festival Singer	
2003	Freaky Friday	Maddie	
2005	The Mosquito	Tia	
2006	See No Evil	Christine	
2007	I Think I Love My Wife	Candy	
2010	Magic Man	Elena	
2021	The Guilty	Sergeant Denise Wade	
2025	Freakier Friday	Maddie	

=== Television ===
Year	Title	Role	Notes
1994	The Cosby Mysteries	Ramona Suarez	Episode: "Camouflage"
1995	The Commish	Julianna Muldoon	Episode: "Off Broadway: Parts 1 & 2"
1997	F/X: The Series	Theresa	Episode: "Bad Influence"
1997–1998	Nick Freno: Licensed Teacher	Sophia Del Bono	Main role (season 2)
1998	Brink!	Gabriella	Television film
1999	Providence	Street Girl	Episode: "Saint Syd"
1999	Touched by an Angel	Ilena	Episode: "Hearts"
2001–2002	Taina	Taina Maria Morales	Lead role
2003	Hotel	Gisel	Television film
2003	Sabrina, the Teenage Witch	Fate Paris	Episode: "Romance Looming"
2003–2004	10-8: Officers on Duty	Deputy Gabriela Lopez	Main role
2004	Beck and Call		Television short
2004	Second Time Around	Gabrielle Herrera	Episode: "Secrets", "A Kiss Is Still a Kiss"
2005	Clubhouse	Carmen	Episode: "Between First and Home"
2006	Girlfriends	Samantha Stephens	Episodes: "Bad Blood", "Just Joan"
2007	ER	Elena Vega	Episode: "In a Different Light"
2008	Play or Be Played		Television film
2008	Mask of the Ninja	Mercedes	Television film
2009	Monk	Winona	Episode: "Mr. Monk Goes Camping"
2009–2010	House	Sandy	Episodes: "Wilson", "Private Lives"
2010	The Deep End	Rachel Esposito	Episode: "Nothing Personal"
2010	In Plain Sight	Amber Whitman	Episode: "Son of Mann"
2010	Castle	Jamie Ruiz	Episode: "Almost Famous"
2011	Things We Do for Love		Episode: "Best Friend"
2011	Fairly Legal	Sofia Peña	Episode: "Coming Home"
2014	Stalker	Christina Richards	Episode: "Skin"
2015	Being Mary Jane	Lilly	Episode: "Reading the Signs"
2015	The Player	Mrs. Cruz	Episode: "A House Is Not a Home"
2015	Major Crimes	Carmen Tamayo	Episode: "Thick as Thieves"
2015–2016	Code Black	Gina Perrello	Recurring role; 7 episodes
2016	Limitless	Lucy Church	2 episodes
2016	Blue Bloods	ADA Marta Avila	1 episode
2017	Training Day	Det. Valeria Chavez	Main role
2018	Sneaky Pete	Valerie	1 episode
2019	Grand Hotel	Det. Ayala	4 episodes
2020	United We Fall	Jo Ryan	Main role
2021	The Shrink Next Door	Hannah	Recurring role
2022	The Terminal List	Mac Wilson	Recurring role
2023	Primo	Drea	Main role

== Discography ==
=== Soundtrack appearances ===
List of soundtrack appearances
Title	Year	Album
"Gonna Be A Star"	2002	Taina: Original Television Soundtrack
"Carnival"	2002	Taina: Original Television Soundtrack
"Feel Good"	2002	Taina: Original Television Soundtrack
"I Thought That We Were Friends"	2002	Taina: Original Television Soundtrack
"Voy a Ser Una Estrella (Gonna Be a Star)"	2002	Taina: Original Television Soundtrack
"Take Me Away"	2003	Freaky Friday
"Take Me Away"	2025	Freakier Friday

== Awards and nominations ==
Year	Organization	Award	Work	Result
1994	Young Artist Awards	Best Leading Young Actress in a Feature Film (Note: Tied with Thora Birch.)	Life with Mikey	Won
1994	Young Artist Awards	Most Promising New Youth Actress	Life with Mikey	Won
2002	ALMA Awards	Outstanding Actress in a Television Series	Taina	Nominated
2024	Imagen Awards	Best Actress – Comedy (Television)	Primo	Nominated
