= Freaky Friday (franchise) =

- 2003 film logo, with the font reused for its 2025 sequel
- Based on: Freaky Friday by Mary Rodgers
- Distributed by: The Walt Disney Company
- Country: United States
- Language: English
- Budget: >$25,000,000
- Box office: $163,440,532 (Note: This figure is the sum of total box office income, accumulated from the theatrical releases.)

The Freaky Friday franchise consists of American family comedies, including the original film, a television film adaptation, the film remake and a sequel to that film, and a stage musical and a film adaptation of that stage production. The franchise as a whole centers around body swapping between parents and their children, who initially find they cannot agree on anything. Over the course of each respective installment, they individually find that they have respect for each other and they gain a better understanding of the other person.

The original 1976 film was met with mixed reviews. The 1995 television film adaptation was poorly received, by critics and viewers alike. The 2003 theatrical remake and its 2025 sequel were met with positive reviews. Despite the negative reception to the stage musical, its 2018 Disney Channel movie adaptation received positive reviews from critics. The theatrical installments fared well at the box office, earning a profit for Disney.

== Origin ==
The 1972 American children's book authored by Mary Rodgers was released by Harper & Row publishing. A hardheaded teenage girl named Annabel Andrews who is often misaligned with her mother, believes that her mother has the most ideal life. She frequently wishes she had as much freedom. One morning she awakens to find that she is now her mom. In her new role, she must handle the peskiness of her younger brother Benjamin, and complete the daily responsibilities as matriarch of the family. Though she searches for her own body, she cannot find her. Through the events of the day, to her surprise she learns that her brother actually idolizes her. Soon she becomes overwhelmed with responsibility and discovers that Ben has gone missing. While in the body of her mother, she also learns that Boris Harris, the handsome and charming young gentleman she has a crush on, likes her back. Frantically she begins looking for her brother, with neighbors reporting that he left the house to get ice cream with a "teenage beauty".

By the end of the day, her mother returns in the body of Annabel—albeit with a makeover—and reveals that she inexplicably caused the body-swapping scenario. She hadn't really been missing, as she had gone to her scheduled orthodontics appointment to have her braces removed, an event that had slipped Annabel's own mind, while Ben followed along with her. Annabel learns that her mother cherishes their relationship, sees her as beautiful (as evidenced by the makeover), and learns that she needs to be more punctual and responsible than she has been.

The author wrote two direct sequels titled A Freaky Friday Story: A Billion for Boris (Also Known as ESP TV) published in 1974, and Summer Switch: A Freaky Friday Story published in 1982. In A Billion for Boris, things are back to normal for the Andrews family. After Ben repairs a used television that he purchased from Boris, it inexplicably begins showing footage from the future. As Anabel discovers this anomaly she ventures to use its new abilities similar to ESP to help other people, while Boris seeks to use it for personal gain. In Summer Switch, the Anders family once again finds themselves in a body-swap situation. Years later when Ben is a young teenager, he offhandedly wishes he could live life like his business executive father, while begrudgingly getting on a school bus headed for summer camp. As he struggles through a day at the office, his dad is forced to be involved with the camp activities. The duo work through their days, all while hoping to regain their natural bodies. Additionally, Rogers co-wrote a thematic sequel novel with the 2003 feature film screenwriter Heather Hach titled Freaky Monday published in 2009 by HarperCollins Publishers LLC. The premise though similar, follows different characters: a schedule and order-oriented student named Hadley, and a spontaneous laid-back teacher named Ms. Pitt. When the pair of them inexplicably switch bodies they seek for an instant resolution, but through the process acquire a respect for each other, and an understanding that change is progress.

== Films ==
Film	U.S. release date	Director	Screenwriter(s)	Producer
Freaky Friday	December 17, 1976	Gary Nelson	Mary Rodgers	Ron W. Miller
Freaky Friday	May 6, 1995	Melanie Mayron	Stu Krieger	Joan Van Horn
Freaky Friday	August 6, 2003	Mark Waters	Heather Hach & Leslie Dixon	Andrew Gunn
Freaky Friday	August 10, 2018	Steve Carr	Bridget Carpenter	Lisa Towers
Freakier Friday	August 8, 2025	Nisha Ganatra	Jordan Weiss	Kristin Burr & Andrew Gunn

=== Freaky Friday (1976) ===
Ellen and Annabel Andrews are a mother-daughter duo that are constantly at odds with each other. After a particular quarrel, Annabel heads out for a Thursday night with her friends. As they go about their respective evenings, and with a Friday the 13th beginning in frustration they both vocalize: "I wish I could switch places with her for just one day." By inexplicable magic, the conscious personalities of each swaps bodies.

Ellen, now in Annabel's teenage body, attends high school trying her best to imitate her daughter. Over the course of the day she feigns at marching band practice, struggles through the classes, is unsuccessful at waterskiing, and contributes to her field hockey team's loss. As she struggles through the day, she begins to realize that there's more to the student life than she had remembered. Meanwhile, Annabel spending the day in Ellen's middle-aged body, proceeds to try her hand at mimicking the everyday housewife responsibilities of her mom's including laundry, car repairs, grocery shopping, carpet cleaning, dry cleaning, and taking care of her younger brother Ben. As they begin to interact more often, she comes to realize that he has always looked up to her as his sister. When she is tasked by Bill, Ellen's husband and Annabel's father, with cooking a meal for a large formal dinner she begins to realize how much she appreciates her mother. Together they search for a way to reverse the effects of their wish.

=== Freaky Friday (1995) ===
Ellen Andrews and her daughter Annabelle have differing opinions on everything. They seldom get along, and find that they are often at odds with each other. When they both receive antique amulets, unbeknownst to them the objects have mystic properties and cause their conscious-selves to trade bodies. Ellen now in her teenage daughter's body, navigates the difficulties peers at high school. As she lives through the day as Annabelle, she comes to find that her daughter's life isn't as simple as it seemed. Meanwhile, Annabelle assumes the role of her mother as a successful business woman at a clothing design company, as well as enduring the romantic gestures of her mother's fiancé. As the pair come to a mutual understanding and respect for each other, they work to regain their true bodies.

=== Freaky Friday (2003) ===
Anna Coleman is a teenage aspiring singer and musician in a rock band, called Pink Slip. Tess Coleman is a successful therapist with a book deal, and widowed mother of Anna and Harry. Lately they find that they are constantly arguing. After the death of her father, Anna has become emotional and closed to those closest to her by hiding her sorrow in her music. While Tess works to provide for her children and continues her successful career, she receives a publishing deal for her book. In addition to this life success, she finds a new chance at love in her fiancé, named Ryan. Though they do not see eye-to-eye, Anna prepares for the chance to perform at Wango Tango with her band, while Tess plans for her wedding.

One night when the family is having dinner at Pei-Pei's Chinese restaurant, they begin to get into an argument. When Pei-Pei's mother overhears their conversation, she offers them both fortune cookies. As they go their separate ways, they read the fortunes and through ancient Chinese magic, their intelligences swap bodies before losing consciousness. When they awake, they realize to their horror what has inexplicably happened.

Tess now living in her teenage daughter's body, attends high school and tries to navigate the pressures of bullies, teachers, homework, acceptance by her peers, avoiding the advances of Anna's crush, and the Pink Slip's band practices. Anna now in Tess's middle-aged body, goes through her mother's usual tasks as a therapist, prepares for her appearance on a talk show to promote the release of her mother's book, and tries to avoid Ryan. As they begin to understand each other on a more personal level, and as they get closer to the wedding rehearsal dinner and concert events, the mother-daughter team work together to find a way to reverse the Chinese curse that caused their situation, all while trying to complete their respective life achievements.

=== Freaky Friday (2018) ===
A film adaptation of the 2016 musical, and based on the previous film adaptations, the film's plot is largely similar to the other films.

Katherine and Ellie Blake are mother and daughter, but they find that they are often at odds with each other. Ellie wants to attend an annual scavenger event planned and hosted by her school, but Katherine worries about her daughter and won't approve her attendance to "the Hunt". Katherine is a successful businesswoman, planning and preparing for her next catering project at her own wedding. Through unexplained magical means, an hourglass that Ellie's deceased father had given her causes the pair to switch bodies. Forced to work together, despite their differences, they decide that if an identical relic that was gifted to Katherine is found it may reverse the spell. Katherine however, sold the item before and so finding it may prove more difficult than they thought.

Katherine now in Ellie's teenage body, attends her classes and realizes that her daughter has been dealing with bullying from her peers. Through a series of events she discovers that her daughter rebells against her guidance and received a belly button piercing, and has been sluffing her classes. Meanwhile Ellie in her mother's adult body, tries to help prepare for the marriage ceremony celebrations. This includes having to interact with her mother's fiancé named Mike. While both of their days are not going as planned, they learn that the hourglass was purchased from an antique store, and will be used during "the Hunt". The mother and daughter start to gain a mutual respect for each other, and hurry to find a way back into their own bodies before the wedding day.

=== Freakier Friday (2025) ===
In December 2019, a reboot of the franchise was announced to be in development from Walt Disney Pictures, as a Disney+ exclusive feature film, until it was moved to the theatrical release slate. By October 2022, Jamie Lee Curtis stated that she had approached Disney regarding developing a sequel to the 2003 film, that she co-starred in with Lindsay Lohan. Curtis stated that she hoped to appear in a follow-up that would show what the respective characters have been doing over the years. In November of the same year, Lohan expressed interest in reprising her role alongside Curtis, while confirming that she has had discussions concerning the potential film with the associated studio. By February 2023, Curtis stated though she could not be the person to officially announce it, the actress insisted that the sequel was "going to happen".

In May 2023, Curtis and Lohan jointly stated that they were both hoping to return in their respective roles. Disney confirmed a sequel was in development, with Elyse Hollander writing the screenplay, and Curtis and Lohan in early negotiations to co-star in the project. In June of the same year, Curtis stated that principal photography would begin the following year. In March 2024, it was announced Nisha Ganatra would be directing from a screenplay written by Jordan Weiss and filming set for the summer in Los Angeles. Andrew Gunn, who produced the 2003 movie, was confirmed to produce again along with Kristin Burr. Principal photography commenced on June 24, 2024, in Los Angeles. Sophia Hammons and Maitreyi Ramakrishnan joined the cast while returning supporting cast includes Mark Harmon, Chad Michael Murray, Christina Vidal Mitchell, Haley Hudson, Lucille Soong, Stephen Tobolowsky and Rosalind Chao. In August 2024, the movie was retitled Freakier Friday.

== Additional crew and production details ==
Film	Crew/Detail					
Film	Composer(s)	Cinematographer(s)	Editor	Production companies	Distributing companies	Running time
Freaky Friday (1976)	Johnny Mandel	Charles F. Wheeler	Cotton Warburton	Walt Disney Productions	Buena Vista Distribution Co., Inc.	1 hr 35 mins
Freaky Friday (1995)	James McVay & Lisa Harlow Stark	Russ Alsobrook	Henk Van Eeghen	Walt Disney Television, ZM Productions	Buena Vista Television, Disney–ABC Domestic Television, American Broadcasting Company	1 hr 26 mins
Freaky Friday (2003)	Rolfe Kent	Oliver Wood	Bruce Green	Walt Disney Pictures, Casual Friday Productions, Gunn Films	Buena Vista Pictures	1 hr 37 mins
Freaky Friday (2018)	David Lawrence	Adam Santelli & John Carrafa	Craig Herring	Disney Channel Original Movies, Bad Angels Productions	Disney Channel, Disney Branded Television	1 hr 30 mins
Freakier Friday (2025)	Amie Doherty	Matthew Clark	Eleanor Infante	Walt Disney Pictures	Walt Disney Studios Motion Pictures	1 hr 51 mins

== Stage ==
Developed by Disney Theatrical Productions, under the direction of Christopher Ashley with music by Tom Kitt and lyrics written by Brian Yorkey; the project was based on the original novel, as well as its 1976, 1995, and 2003 film adaptations. The production debuted on October 4, 2016, at the Signature Theatre in Arlington, Virginia. Heidi Blickenstaff and Emma Hunton featured as the co-leads as Katherine and Ellie Blake, respectively. Though not initially ordered directly to Broadway, the option from the production studio is available. The stage-script was written by Bridget Carpenter with an accompanying book release, while choreography was created by Sergio Trujillo. Similar to previous adaptations, the plot centers around a woman and her teenage daughter, who though initially at odds magically swap bodies and must work together to set things right before Katherine's wedding.

The play was met overall with mixed critical reception, with praise directed at the "believable" performance of its cast, its "timeless appeal", and its effective direction for its target audience. Conversely, criticisms were directed at its lyrics and "frenetic" style.

A previous musical adaptation, with book and lyrics by Rodgers, and music by John Forster, was a failure. The song "At the Same Time" from this adaptation appears on Volume 3 of the "Unsung Musicals" album series.

== Reception ==
=== Box office and financial performance ===
Film	Box office gross			Box office ranking		Video sales gross	Worldwide total gross income	Budget	Worldwide total net income	Ref.
Film	North America	Other territories	Worldwide	All time North America	All time worldwide	North America	Worldwide total gross income	Budget	Worldwide total net income	Ref.
Freaky Friday (1976)	$25,942,000	—N/a	$25,942,000	#3,294	—N/a	—N/a	>$25,942,000	$5,000,000	≥$20,942,000	
Disney's Freaky Friday (1995)	—N/a	—N/a	—N/a	—N/a	—N/a	—N/a	—N/a	—N/a	—N/a	—N/a
Freaky Friday (2003)	$110,230,332	$50,616,000	$160,846,332	#730	#1,251	—N/a	>$160,846,332	$20,000,000	$140,846,332	
Freaky Friday (2018)	—N/a	—N/a	—N/a	—N/a	—N/a	$92,708	$92,708	—N/a	<$92,708	
Freakier Friday (2025)	$94,186,236	$58,990,716	$153,176,952	#910	#1,321	—N/a	>$153,176,952	$42,000,000	$111,176,952	
Totals	$230,358,568	$109,606,716	$339,965,284	$\mathbf{\bar{x}}$ 987	$\mathbf{\bar{x}}$ 514	>$92,708	>$340,057,992	>$67,000,000	~$273,057,992 (Note: This is an approximate calculation, based on the limited public information about each film.)	

=== Critical and public response ===
Critical and public response of Freaky Friday films
Film	Critical		Public
Film	Rotten Tomatoes	Metacritic	CinemaScore
Freaky Friday (1976)	65% (26 reviews)	51 (9 reviews)	—N/a
Summer Switch (1984)	—N/a	—N/a	—N/a
A Billion for Boris (1984)		—N/a	—N/a
Disney's Freaky Friday (1995)		—N/a	—N/a
Freaky Friday (2003)	88% (160 reviews)	70 (36 reviews)	A−
Freaky Friday (2018)	71% (7 reviews)	—N/a	—N/a
Freakier Friday (2025)	74% (222 reviews)	62 (34 reviews)	A
