= Freaky Friday (musical) =

2016 musical by Tom Kitt, Brian Yorkey, and Bridget Carpenter

- Promotional art
- Music: Tom Kitt
- Lyrics: Brian Yorkey
- Book: Bridget Carpenter
- Basis: Freaky Friday by Mary Rodgers; Freaky Friday by Mary Rodgers; Freaky Friday by Stu Krieger; Freaky Friday by; Heather Hach; Leslie Dixon
- Premiere: October 4, 2016: Signature Theatre, Arlington, Virginia
- Productions: 2016 Arlington; 2017 San Diego; 2017 Cleveland; 2017 Houston

Freaky Friday is a musical with music by Tom Kitt, lyrics by Brian Yorkey, and a book by Bridget Carpenter. It premiered in 2016. It is based on the 1972 novel of the same name by Mary Rodgers and its 1976, 1995, and 2003 film adaptations. In the story, when an overworked mother and her teenage daughter magically swap bodies, they have just one day to put things right again before the mom's wedding.

A film adaptation was released on Disney Channel in 2018.

== Productions ==
The Freaky Friday musical was developed by Disney Theatrical Productions from the book and Disney films for theatres to license. The musical debuted at the Signature Theatre in Arlington, Virginia on October 4, 2016. Direction was by Christopher Ashley and choreography was by Sergio Trujillo. Heidi Blickenstaff and Emma Hunton led the cast.

In 2017, the show was slated for the next season at La Jolla Playhouse, the Cleveland Playhouse and Houston's Alley Theater and opened there in January, again with Blickenstaff and Hunton starring. Blickenstaff and Hunton then appeared at the Cleveland Playhouse from April 15 to May 20 and at the Alley Theatre, Houston, Texas, from June 2 to July 2. The musical was presented in Norfolk, Virginia in December by the Virginia Musical Theatre and in Atlanta, Georgia by the Horizon Theatre Company.

Coinciding with the release of the Disney Channel Original Movie (DCOM) adaptation, a one-act version of the stage musical (featuring all the songs used in the DCOM adaptation) was made available on August 10, 2018 for licensing.

According to Entertainment Weekly, "presently there are plans to transfer the show to Broadway, the door is also now wide open for licensing for professional, regional, and amateur productions around the country".

The musical had its UK premiere at HOME, Manchester from November 27, 2025, to January 10, 2026, and was directed by Andy Fickman and produced by Paul Taylor-Mills.

== Plot ==
Act I

The musical opens with Ellie Blake telling the audience about the worst 24 hours of her life ("Just One Day"). Her mother, Katherine, is a wedding planner who is getting married the next day while simultaneously arranging her own wedding. Ellie is resentful towards her brother, Fletcher, for annoying her; and her soon to be stepfather, Mike, for being overbearing. Ellie's friends, Gretchen and Hannah, want her to join them in The Hunt, a scavenger hunt that involves traveling around the city all night. Katherine forbids it because The Hunt is the same time as the rehearsal dinner. This leads to a confrontation between Ellie and Katherine that ends with a magical hourglass being broken and the two switching bodies ("The Hourglass").

They try to switch back but the magic only works when the hourglass is whole. Ellie suggests using the hourglass's twin as a replacement. Katherine reveals that she sold the hourglass's twin, a present from her late husband, to help pay for her catering business. The two decide that they have to pretend to be one another until the second magical hourglass can be found. Both think that the other's life is easier and each one is confident she will do a better job ("I Got This"). Ellie has to be interviewed by Danielle for Weddings Magazine about her upcoming ceremony. She relies on Katherine's assistant, Torrey, to answer most of the questions and fabricates a story of how she operates her business ("What You Got"). She starts an impromptu party in the kitchen that destroys the wedding cake. Katherine attends Ellie's school and realizes how difficult Ellie's school life is with harsh teachers and a bully named Savannah. Katherine meets Adam and her teenage body's chemistry makes her feel attracted to him ("Oh, Biology"). Mike arrives at the house to get ready for the rehearsal dinner and is interviewed with Ellie about their beautiful flowers. Ellie does not know anything about him and the interview goes terribly. Mike decides to read his vows to "Katherine" and she is repulsed by him, confusing everybody present ("Vows").

Ellie and Katherine discover secrets about each other. Ellie discovers her mother smokes cigarettes and Katherine discovers her daughter has a lower back tattoo. Ellie's friends and their parents also discover each other's secrets leading to mutual distrust ("Busted"). Ellie and Katherine also discover that each has kept a memento signifying their former close relationship. A parent/teacher conference is called to discuss Ellie's many absences and outlandish behavior. During the conference, Mrs. Luckenbill reveals that Ellie's behavior got worse after her father died. Ellie shrugs this off while Katherine realizes how busy she has been lately, taking no time for her daughter and marrying a man before giving her daughter time to grieve ("Somebody Has Got to Take the Blame"). Before they can discuss this further, Katherine is taken to gym class by Ms. Meyers.

After Ellie picks up Fletcher from his school, she discovers that the pawn shop her mom sold the hourglass to has closed. Fletcher inspires her to put the hourglass on the list for The Hunt. This way every student at Ellie's school will be looking for it and once it is found, they can switch back. Ellie texts Katherine to ask Adam, who is in charge of The Hunt, to make the hourglass one of the scavenger hunt's items. Katherine tries to ally herself with Savannah, who is a champion of The Hunt, in hopes of getting to the item first. Gretchen and Hannah feel betrayed by "Ellie" and Adam refuses to add the hourglass as it wouldn't be fair to the other competitors. All the while, Ms. Meyers is giving Katherine a strenuous P.E. exam and Katherine ultimately fails ("Watch Your Back").

Fletcher tells his "mom" how excited he is to have a new dad. The cynical Ellie reveals how many times his parents have lied to him about things in his childhood while also lamenting how her father promised he would never leave her, only to die ("Parents Lie"). All of the guests arrive for the dinner rehearsal while Ellie and Katherine's lives begin to fall apart. Gretchen and Hannah kick "Ellie" off of the team for working with Savannah. Torrey quits because of the immense pressure about the Weddings Magazine article and trying to replace the destroyed wedding cake. "Katherine" tells Mike that she may call off the wedding. Fletcher is furious at his family and he decides to run away from home. The wedding guests discover Fletcher has run away and wonder what tomorrow will bring ("Just One Day (Reprise)").

Act II

All of the wedding guests band together to find Fletcher while Ellie, Katherine, and Torrey lament to the audience how wrong this day has gone ("Not Myself Today"). Fletcher sits at the bus stop waiting to take him to Las Vegas. Adam comes across Fletcher and tells him how he was angry with his family when he was younger but reconciled with them because they ultimately love each other. Adam and Fletcher bond over how crazy their families can be ("Women and Sandwiches").

Mike calls the police to look for Fletcher. The officers do not listen to Katherine thinking she is just a teenager. They inundate Ellie with questions who realizes that she doesn't know her brother that well. The officers jump to the worst possible conclusions, worrying the entire family ("Bring My Baby (Brother) Home"). Adam arrives with Fletcher after having convinced him to come home. "Katherine" tells Adam that the hourglass was a gift from Ellie's late father and he decides to put it on the list, seeing how important it is to her. Gretchen and Hannah ask "Ellie" to come back to the team and forgiveness for their hastiness. Ellie gives Katherine permission to go on The Hunt while she stays behind to fix the wedding.

Adam announces the items for The Hunt over the phone and all of the students run around the city looking for them ("Go"). Ellie tries to convince Danielle to stay, promising that nothing will go wrong at the wedding. Ellie convinces Torrey to return to work and Mike replaces the wedding cake with seven-layer bars. Danielle is invited to help out and she decides to give them one more chance. They stay up all night ensuring that the wedding will be perfect for tomorrow morning. Fletcher is tired out and Ellie sings him to sleep and emotionally connects with him for this first time in years ("After All of This and Everything").

Savannah's team and Ellie's team become tied for the lead with the only item remaining being the hourglass. They find the hourglass at Mrs. Time's Watch Shop and are able to retrieve it. Savannah arrives and blackmails Mrs. Time into giving her the hourglass. This leads to a physical altercation over the hourglass with Katherine breaking Savannah's nose and stealing it back ("No More Fear"). Katherine arrives at the house before the wedding ceremony commences. Katherine and Ellie try to switch their bodies back, only for the hourglass not to work ("The Other Hourglass"). Both of them worry about living in the other's body for the rest of their lives. Katherine tells Ellie to call off the wedding with Mike until they can fix this. Ellie delivers an impassioned speech about how difficult her family's lives have been since her father's death. It wasn't until Mike came into their lives that Katherine became happy once again. Once Ellie says "I love you", the hourglass begins to glow. Katherine and Ellie grab hold of the hourglass and affirm their love for each other, switching back to their original bodies. Ellie and Katherine realize how difficult each other's lives are and decide never to take the other for granted. Katherine marries Mike and the wedding party celebrates ("Today and Ev'ry Day").

== Musical numbers ==
A Studio Cast album featuring Blickenstaff and Hunton was released on February 10, 2017.

La Jolla Playhouse

Act I

- "Just One Day" – Ellie, Katherine, Company
- "I Got This" – Ellie, Katherine, Adam, Savannah, Students, Teachers
- "What You Got" – Katherine, Torrey, Danielle, Louis
- "Oh, Biology" – Ellie, Adam, Wells, Savannah, Gretchen, Parker, Students
- "Vows" – Mike
- "Busted" – Ellie, Katherine, Adam, Gretchen, Hannah, Savannah, Wells, Parker, Parents, Students
- "Somebody Has Got to Take the Blame" – Katherine, Ellie, Dr. Ehrin, Señor O’Brien, Mrs. Luckenbill
- "I Got This (Reprise)" – Katherine
- "Watch Your Back" – Ms. Meyers, Ellie, Adam, Gretchen, Hannah, Students
- "Parents Lie" – Katherine
- "Just One Day (Reprise)" – Ellie, Katherine, Torrey, Fletcher, Gretchen, Hannah, Company

Act II

- "Not Myself Today" – Katherine, Ellie, Torrey, Company
- "Women and Sandwiches" – Adam and Fletcher
- "Bring My Baby (Brother) Home" – Katherine, Ellie, Mike, Officers
- "Go" – Adam, Ellie, Gretchen, Hannah, Wells, Parker, Company
- "After All of This and Everything" – Katherine
- "No More Fear" – Ellie
- "Today and Ev’ry Day" – Ellie, Katherine, Company

Studio Cast recording released on February 10, 2017 digitally and February 17 physically.

Act I

- "Prologue"
- "Just One Day"
- "The Hourglass"
- "I Got This"
- "What You Got"
- "Oh, Biology"
- "Vows"
- "Busted"
- "Somebody Has Got to Take the Blame"
- "Watch Your Back"
- "Parents Lie"
- "Just One Day (Reprise)"

Act II

- "Not Myself Today"
- "Women and Sandwiches"
- "Bring My Baby (Brother) Home"
- "Go"
- "After All of This and Everything"
- "No More Fear"
- "The Other Hourglass"
- "Today and Ev'ry Day"

== Characters and original cast ==
Casts of major stage productions

Character	Signature Theatre (2016)	La Jolla (2017)	Disney Channel Movie (2018)	HOME (2025)
Ellie	Emma Hunton	Emma Hunton	Cozi Zuehlsdorff	Jena Pandya
Katherine	Heidi Blickenstaff	Heidi Blickenstaff	Heidi Blickenstaff	Rebecca Lock
Torrey	J. Elaine Marcos	Alet Taylor	Kahyun Kim	Tori Scott
Wells / Louis	Julian Ramos	Julian Ramos	Joshua Pak	Dylan Gordon-Jones (Wells)
Pastor Bruno / Dr. Ehrin / Officer Kowalski	Jason SweetTooth Williams	Jason SweetTooth Williams	Colby Wilson (Officer Kowalski); Gary Jones (Principal Ehrin); Gaalen Engen (Pastor)	Waylon Jacobs (Dr. Ehrin)
Parker	Thaddeus McCants	Eean Cochran		Morgan Gregory
Ms. Meyers / Danielle / Officer Sitz	Cicily Daniels	Jeannette Bayardelle	Rukiya Bernard (Danielle); Lauren McGibbon (Ms. Meyers)	Katharine Pearson (Danielle)
Fletcher	Tyler Bowman Jake Heston Miller	Jake Heston Miller	Jason Maybaum	Jackson Waites Ghaith Saleh
Mike	Alan H. Green	David Jennings	Alex Désert	Ian Virgo
Grandpa Gordon / Mr. Blumen / Señor O'Brien	Bobby Smith	Joseph Dellger	Jag Arneja (Señor O'Brien); Dave Hurtubise (Mr. Blumen)	James Sterling (Grandpa Joe)
Grandma Helene / Mrs. Luckenbill / Mrs. Time	Sherri L. Edelen	Mary Jo McConnell	Paula Burrows (Mrs. Luckenbill); Jocelyne Loewen (Mrs. Time)	Catherine Millsom (Grandma Helene)
Hannah	Shayna Blass	Sumi Yu		Beth Savill
Gretchen	Katie Ladner	Jennafer Newberry		Samantha Ho
Savannah	Storm Lever	Jessie Hooker	Dara Reneé	Jessica Butterworth
Adam	Jason Gotay	Chris Ramirez	Ricky He	Max Mirza
Karl Carlson			Isaiah Lehtinen	
Monica Yang			Jennifer Laporte	
Kitty			Marlowe Percival	
Laurel				Ellie Gilbert-Grey

== Reception ==
The Variety reviewer called the Signature Theatre production a "delightfully spunky musical... Delivered at a lively pace."

== Television adaptation ==
A Disney Channel and Disney Theatrical Productions television adaptation of the stage musical premiered on August 10, 2018. Blickenstaff reprised her role as Katherine, while Cozi Zuehlsdorff starred as Ellie. Carpenter adapted the musical, while Kitt and Yorkey oversaw the music and lyrics. It was produced by Susan Cartsonis and Thomas Schumacher.
