= Freaky Friday =

Comedic children's novel (1972)

- First edition
- Author: Mary Rodgers
- Cover artist: Edward Gorey
- Language: English
- Genre: Children's literature, comedy, speculative fiction
- Publisher: Harper & Row
- Publication date: April 1972
- Publication place: United States
- Media type: Print (hardcover)
- Pages: 145
- ISBN: 0-06-025048-8 (HarperCrest library ed., 0-06-025049-6)
- LC Class: PZ7.R6155 Fr
- Followed by: A Billion for Boris

Freaky Friday is a comedic children's novel written by Mary Rodgers, first published by Harper & Row in 1972. The plot is set in a day in the life of 13-year-old Annabel Andrews and her mother, who spend one Friday in each other's bodies.

The novel has been adapted for several films, all by the Walt Disney Company and all with the same title as the book: one in 1976, one in 1995, one in 2003, and one in 2018.

In 2025, Freaky Friday was reissued in commemoration of Freakier Friday, the sequel to the 2003 film adaptation of the novel.

The premise of a parent swapping bodies with a child was earlier used in F. Anstey's 1882 novel Vice Versa.

== Plot ==
A willful, disorganized teenage girl, Annabel Andrews, awakens one Friday morning to find herself in the body of her mother, with whom she argued the previous night.

Annabel suddenly finds herself in charge of the New York family's affairs and must now take care of her younger brother Ben (whom Annabel has not-so-affectionately nicknamed "Ape Face" and described as "so neat, it's revolting!"). She grows increasingly worried about the disappearance of "Annabel," who appeared to be herself in the morning but has gone missing after leaving the Andrews' home, and she enlists the help of her neighbor and childhood friend, Boris, though without telling him about her identity crisis.

As the day wears on and Annabel has a series of increasingly bizarre and frustrating adventures, which includes the sacking of the alcoholic and thieving cleaning woman, she becomes gradually more appreciative of how difficult her mother's life is. She learns, to her surprise, that Ben idolizes her, and Boris is actually named Morris, but has a problem with chronic congestion (at least around Annabel) leading him to nasally pronounce m's and n's as b's and d's. As the novel approaches its climax, Ben also disappears, apparently having gone off with a gorgeous girl whom Boris did not recognize, but Ben appeared to trust without hesitation.

In the climax and dénouement, Annabel becomes overwhelmed by the difficulties of her situation, the apparent disappearance of her mother, the loss of the children, and the question of how her odd situation came about and when/whether it will be resolved. Finally, it is revealed that Annabel's mother herself caused them to switch bodies through some unspecified means, and the mysterious teen beauty who took Ben was Mrs. Andrews in Annabel's body (to which she is restored) made much more attractive by a makeover Mrs. Andrews gave the body while using it, including the removal of Annabel's braces, an appointment Annabel had forgotten about (and would have missed, had she been the one in her body that day).

== Characters ==
Annabel Andrews
Disorganized, rebellious, tomboyish, 13-year-old Annabel struggles with her mother's bossiness and believes that adults have it easy. She finds herself out of her depth when faced with adult responsibilities and concerns.
Ben Andrews, a.k.a. Ape Face
A pre-adolescent younger sibling, 6-year-old Ben enjoys creating conflict with Annabel, which has led to her nicknaming him Ape Face. Unknown to Annabel, he and his friends admire Annabel, and he wears the nickname as a badge of honor. The truth comes out when she slips up and calls him Ape Face while her mind is in Mrs. Andrews' body. After she apologizes, he admits that he likes the name, but wants to keep this secret from Annabel.
Morris/Boris
A childhood friend of Annabel, he has been somewhat afraid of her since a sandbox incident in which she cut his head open with a shovel. Deciding she played too rough, he and his mother have made a point of him avoiding Annabel. He is described as a cheerful, charming and handsome young gentleman, and does his best to help "Mrs. Andrews" (really Annabel) as she struggles through a tough day. He has some occasional breathing trouble, attributed to his adenoids and possibly a psychosomatic reaction to his own mother, which renders his voice nasal, making him unable to pronounce the letters m and n clearly. Because of this, Annabel has always believed his name to be Boris, when it is in fact Morris. However, she suffers the opposite misunderstanding when he offers to prepare a "beetloaf" for a dinner party with the limited assortment of culinary ingredients available. She believes he is going to save dinner by providing a much more sensible meatloaf, but she is won over when she samples the new dish and finds it tasty.
Ellen Jean Benjamin Andrews
Despite setting the events in motion and later ending them deus ex machina-style, Mrs. Andrews remains (along with Annabel's body, which she has taken) an unseen character for much of the book, only revealing herself and what she has done at the end of the day.

== Themes ==
The book's themes include empathy and understanding, generational conflict, self-discovery, love and family bonds, and coming of age.

== Sequel novels ==
Mary Rodgers wrote two sequels featuring the Andrews family. In A Billion for Boris (October 1974), Annabel and her friend Morris/Boris discover a TV set that tunes into future broadcasts and begin betting on horse races.

In Summer Switch (September 1982), Annabel's little brother Ben and their father Bill inadvertently switch bodies as both are leaving for the summer, leaving the boy to negotiate in Hollywood and Dad to attend summer camp. All three Andrews family novels were soon published in Harper Trophy trade paperback editions. In later HarperTrophy editions, the second story has been titled ESP TV (1999) and A Billion for Boris: Also known as ESP TV (2003).

Additionally, a thematic sequel co-written by Rodgers and Heather Hach was published by The Bowen Press and HarperCollins Publishers LLC, in May 2009 titled Freaky Monday. In the story an orderly schedule oriented 13-year-old schoolgirl Hadley, and a spontaneous easy-going teacher named Ms. Pitt inexplicably swap bodies. Similar to the previous books, the pair search for a quick resolution, but find a level of respect for each other in the process.

== Film adaptations ==
The novel was adapted into a number of films, by The Walt Disney Company spawning the successful titular franchise.

- Walt Disney Pictures first released the 1976 theatrical film with a screenplay written by Rodgers, starring Barbara Harris and Jodie Foster in the lead roles of Ellen and Annabel Andrews.
- In 1995, the studio released a second adaptation which premiered on American Broadcasting Company (ABC) as a part of The Wonderful World of Disney exclusive films. The project was titled Disney's Freaky Friday, and starred Shelley Long and Gaby Hoffmann as Ellen and Annabel Andrews. For the movie, the characters unintentionally switched bodies by means of magical amulets when they both expressed envy for the other's seemingly simpler existence.
- Disney later released the 2003 theatrical film, starring Jamie Lee Curtis and Lindsay Lohan as Tess and Anna Coleman, respectively. The pair are switched by mystical means, through words written on the papers within fortune cookies given to them by a meddling elderly Chinese woman after overhearing their argument at her daughter's restaurant. Referencing the second novel, the end of the movie the owner of the restaurant stops her mother from once again interfering in other peoples' lives as she tries to give magical fortune cookies to the son and father of Tess.
  - A sequel to the 2003 film, titled Freakier Friday, was released by Disney in 2025. All of the main and supporting cast from the 2003 film reprised their role in this sequel. The sequel showed Anna (Lohan) switching body with her daughter, Harper (Julia Butters), and Tess (Curtis) switching body with Anna's soon-to-be step-daughter and Harper's nemesis from school, Lily (Sophia Hammons), before Anna's wedding to Lily's father, Eric (Manny Jacinto).
- Disney Channel and Disney Theatrical Productions produced another television film, adapting the musical of the same name, which premiered in August 2018; Heidi Blickenstaff reprises her role as the mother, while Cozi Zuehlsdorff portrays her daughter. The protagonists' names were changed to Katherine and Ellie Blake, respectively.

Additionally, a limited theatrical release and adaptation of the first sequel book was released with the title of A Billion for Boris in 1985. The movie was later released via pay-per-view television on Disney Channel in 1987, before receiving a broadcast debut in 1988 on CBS. With a plot faithful to the source material, the movie featured recurring characters with: Mary Tanner as Annabel Andrews, Sally Stark as Ellen Andrews, Scott Tiler as Boris Harris, and Seth Green as Benjamin "Ape-Face" Andrews. In 1984, a television film adaptation of the second sequel novel was released with the titled as Summer Switch. Starring Robert Klein and Scott Schwartz, the movie was released as a part of the ABC Afterschool Special originals (not to be confused with the unrelated 1994 television film Summertime Switch).

=== Analysis ===
Comparing the novel and the films, differences can be seen in the presence of an outside influence switching the often-bickering mother and daughter against both of their wills. This change makes both characters protagonists; each movie starting shortly before the switch depicting the conflicts between them, before following the individual characters' struggles through the other's daily lives and ultimately gaining an added level of respect for each other. In the first film, Rodgers added a hobby for Annabel which includes an important competition, for which her mother has lack of experience and skill, serving as the climax of the movie. This addition has been included in some form through each subsequent adaptation: waterskiing in the 1976 film, competitive diving in the 1995 adaptation, a Battle of the Bands music competition in the 2003 movie, and a school sponsored scavenger hunt in the 2018 adaptation of the musical. Additionally, a simultaneous important event for the mother character was added to the 2003 film, to include her wedding rehearsal dinner.

In the first movie, Morris is changed to a character named Boris and is adjusted to be Annabel's love interest, rather than beginning the story as a rival of hers. In the 1995 and 2003 adaptations, the role is renamed as Luke and Jake, respectively. In each of the films, the character comedically falls in love with the mother due to the daughter's consciousness being in her body. Noteworthily, Marc McClure portrays the character of Boris in both the 1976 original film and in a cameo role in the 2003 release where the character is now a delivery man; establishing both films take place in the same loose continuity.

=== Legacy ===
Freaky (2020), directed by Christopher Landon from a screenplay by Landon and Michael Kennedy, was inspired by Freaky Friday's basic plot, and is integrated into a horror-comedy slasher film. The movie stars Vince Vaughn and Kathryn Newton as an infamous serial killer and a tormented high school student, respectively; who switch bodies after the former stabs her with an ancient dagger. The film's working title was Freaky Friday the 13th.

== Stage musical ==
An adaptation for a stage musical was developed by Disney Theatrical Productions, with the music written by Tom Kitt and lyrics written by Brian Yorkey; with an accompanying book and stage-play script by Bridget Carpenter. The musical began performances at the Signature Theatre, Arlington, Virginia on October 4, 2016. Directed by Christopher Ashley, with choreography by Sergio Trujillo, the cast features Emma Hunton (as the daughter Ellie), Jason Gotay and Heidi Blickenstaff (as the mother Katherine). Ashley explained that the musical is based on the original Rodgers book as well as the films. The musical is set in the present-day Chicago. Later, the musical debuted performances at the La Jolla Playhouse, San Diego, on January 31, 2017, and ran to March 12. The cast features Emma Hunton and Heidi Blickenstaff. This was followed by runs at Cleveland Play House in April and the Alley Theatre in June.

Disney Channel released a television film adaptation of the stage musical in the summer of 2018. Blickenstaff reprised her role as the mother Katherine, while Cozi Zuehlsdorff starred as the daughter Ellie. Carpenter returned to adapt the musical as a teleplay, while Kitt and Yorkey returned to oversee the music and lyrics. The TV adaptation was produced by Susan Cartsonis and Thomas Schumacher.

== See also ==
- Body swap appearances in media
