= Freaky Friday (1976 film) =

1976 film by Gary Nelson

- Theatrical release poster
- Directed by: Gary Nelson
- Screenplay by: Mary Rodgers
- Based on: Freaky Friday by Mary Rodgers
- Produced by: Ron Miller
- Starring: Barbara Harris; Jodie Foster; John Astin; Patsy Kelly; Dick Van Patten
- Cinematography: Charles F. Wheeler
- Edited by: Cotton Warburton
- Music by: Johnny Mandel
- Production company: Walt Disney Productions
- Distributed by: Buena Vista Distribution
- Release dates: December 17, 1976 (Los Angeles); January 21, 1977 (United States)
- Running time: 98 minutes
- Country: United States
- Language: English
- Budget: $5 million
- Box office: $25.9 million

Freaky Friday is a 1976 American fantasy comedy film directed by Gary Nelson from a screenplay by Mary Rodgers, based on her 1972 novel. The film stars Barbara Harris and Jodie Foster in the lead roles. John Astin, Patsy Kelly, and Dick Van Patten are featured in supporting roles. In the film, a mother and her daughter switch their bodies, and they get a taste of each other's lives. The cause of the switch is left unexplained in this film, but occurs on Friday the 13th, when Ellen and Annabel, in different places, say about each other at the same time, "I wish I could switch places with her for just one day." Rodgers added a water skiing subplot to her screenplay.

Freaky Friday was released theatrically in the United States on January 21, 1977, by Buena Vista Distribution. The film received positive reviews from critics with praise for Foster and Harris's performances and was a box office success, grossing $36 million on a $5 million budget. At the 34th Golden Globe Awards, it received three nominations: Best Actress – Comedy or Musical (for both Foster and Harris), and Best Original Song ("I'd Like to Be You for a Day"). The success of the film's release led to the launch of a franchise.

== Plot ==
Ellen Andrews and her teenage daughter Annabel frequently quarrel. On a Friday the 13th, they simultaneously wish aloud to trade places for just one day. Their wish is granted instantly, and they are shocked to find themselves in each other's bodies.

Annabel, now in her mother's body, must navigate the responsibilities of being a housewife. She handles laundry, car repairs, grocery deliveries, carpet cleaners, dry cleaning, the housemaid, and the family Basset Hound, Max. The day becomes more complicated when her father, Bill, announces that his catered dinner party has fallen through and asks her to prepare dinner for 25 guests. Annabel enlists Boris, a neighbor she has a crush on, to help look after her younger brother, Ben, and assist in making a chocolate mousse. Despite a series of mishaps, they salvage the evening by transforming the meal into a smörgåsbord. During the day, Annabel bonds with Ben, who shares his admiration for her and confesses he tried to emulate her messiness to connect with her. They play baseball together, leading Annabel to gain a new appreciation for her brother.

Meanwhile, Ellen, now in Annabel's body, struggles with high school life. She exposes her photography class's developing film, ruins several electric typewriters in typing class, disrupts marching band and loses a field hockey game. She finds success in U.S. history class by accurately recounting the Korean War, having lived through the 1950s. Seeking to escape school, Ellen visits Bill's office, where she encounters his new, young, and provocatively dressed secretary. Ellen, posing as Annabel, tries to intimidate her by describing "her mother" as strict. The secretary soon adopts a more modest appearance, wearing glasses and a conservative hairstyle. Ellen then asks Bill for his credit card to pay for Annabel's dental appointment, which he approves. Bill misattributes the secretary's change in demeanor to personal troubles, prompting Ellen to scold herself for her earlier jealousy.

At the end of the day, Ellen and Annabel wish to return to their own bodies. The reversal occurs differently than before: Annabel suddenly finds herself behind the wheel of a car with Ben and Boris, none of whom know how to drive, attracting police attention. Ellen, meanwhile, is pulled onto water skis as she (in Annabel's body) was scheduled to participate in an aquacade. Bill, watching with prospective clients, fears embarrassment, but Ellen's chaotic performance delights the clients, helping him secure a business deal.

With a renewed understanding of each other's lives, Ellen and Annabel reconcile. Annabel begins dating Boris, and Bill joins Ellen for a card game, still puzzled by the day's events. Later, Annabel agrees to let Ben join her and Boris at a pizzeria. Ben laments that he never gets to do fun things like his father, who is preparing for a business trip that involves dirt biking with a Japanese motorcycle company entering the U.S. market. Both Ben and Bill express a desire to switch places for a day, prompting Ellen and Annabel to nervously urge them against it—just before both declare, "Oh, yes, I do!" to the women's dismay.

== Cast ==
- Jodie Foster as Annabel Andrews / Ellen Andrews in Annabel's body
- Barbara Harris as Ellen Andrews / Annabel Andrews in Ellen's body
- John Astin as William Waring "Bill" Andrews, Ellen's husband and father of Annabel and Ben
- Patsy Kelly as Mrs. Schmauss, an elderly drunkard who occasionally comes and helps give Mrs. Andrews a hand in house cleaning.
- Dick Van Patten as Mr. Harold Jennings, who is Mr. Andrew's second-in-command boss under Mr. Jeoffert.
- Vicki Schreck as Virginia, who is Annabel's closest school friend
- Sorrell Booke as Mr. Dilk, who is Annabel's school principal.
- Kaye Ballard as Coach Betsy, who is Annabel's field hockey coach.
- Sparky Marcus as Benjamin "Ben" Andrews, the son of Ellen and Bill and Annabel's younger brother
- Marc McClure as Boris Harris, a neighbor to the Andrews and Annabel's secret crush.
- Charlene Tilton as Bambi
- Brooke Mills as Mrs. Gibbons, Mr. Andrew's Secretary.
- Alan Oppenheimer as Mr. Joffert, who is Mr. Andrew's head boss.
- Ruth Buzzi as Opposing Coach, who is the field hockey coach of the team opposite of Annabel's team who takes joy in taunting and tormenting Coach Betsy.
- Marie Windsor as Mrs. Murphy, Annabel's typing teacher.
- Marvin Kaplan as Carpet Cleaner
- Al Molinaro as Drapery Man
- Iris Adrian as Bus Passenger
- Jack Sheldon as Lloyd
- Laurie Main as Mr. Mills, who is a teacher of photography in Annabel's school.
- Fritz Feld as Mr. Jackman
- Dermott Downs as Harvey Manager
- Barbara Walden as Mrs. Benson
- Ceil Cabot as Miss McGuirk, who is Annabel's English teacher.

== Production ==
Neither Barbara Harris nor Jodie Foster did any actual water skiing in the film. In both cases, these scenes were achieved with the use of professional water skiers in long shot on location, and cutaway shots of the actresses in front of a rear projection effect. However, Foster did play field hockey in the film. Parts of the film were shot in Mission Bay, San Diego.

== Reception ==
On the review aggregator website Rotten Tomatoes, 68% of 25 critics' reviews are positive, with an average rating of 6.1/10. The website's consensus reads: "Freaky Friday is too well-behaved to live up to its comedic potential, but sprightly turns by Barbara Harris and Jodie Foster give the body-swapping farce some charm." Metacritic, which uses a weighted average, assigned the film a score of 51 out of 100, based on 9 critics, indicating "mixed or average" reviews.

Richard Eder of The New York Times wrote: "Toward the end there are some amusing car-chase scenes. Elsewhere the humor is clotted by the feeling that the jokes are chasing the reactions, instead of the other way around." Variety wrote that "a promising concept" had been "bungled by a talky, repetitive screenplay and overbroad direction". Roger Ebert gave the film 2.5 stars out of 4 and wrote: "The problems resulting from the switch of identities are fairly predictable, but fun: This is one of the better recent Disney productions." Gene Siskel also gave the film 2.5 stars out of 4 and stated that the two leads "do a serviceable job with mediocre material". Kevin Thomas of the Los Angeles Times thought that the movie "has the stuff of a stronger, more sophisticated film but has been processed to fit into the bland, synthetic Disney formula. Even so, both Miss Harris and Miss Foster make the most of their offbeat opportunity." Gary Arnold of The Washington Post wrote that the film "suffers from sluggish exposition, mediocre direction and a one-closeup-after-another method of composition advertising the film's eventual retirement to the Disney TV series, but it probably salvages things with juvenile audiences by finishing fast."

== Awards and nominations ==
Award	Category	Nominee(s)	Result	Ref.
Golden Globe Awards	Best Actress in a Motion Picture – Musical or Comedy	Jodie Foster	Nominated	
Golden Globe Awards	Best Actress in a Motion Picture – Musical or Comedy	Barbara Harris (Note: Also received a nomination in the same category for her role in the final Alfred Hitchcock film Family Plot.)	Nominated	
Golden Globe Awards	Best Original Song – Motion Picture	"I'd Like to Be You for a Day"; Music and Lyrics by Al Kasha and Joel Hirschhorn	Nominated	

== Remakes ==
Freaky Friday has been remade three times, all by the Walt Disney Company:

- A 1995 made-for-television film starring Shelley Long and Gaby Hoffmann
- A 2003 theatrical release starring Jamie Lee Curtis and Lindsay Lohan
- A 2018 television musical starring Cozi Zuehlsdorff and Heidi Blickenstaff
