= Freakier Friday =

2025 film by Nisha Ganatra

- Theatrical release poster
- Directed by: Nisha Ganatra
- Screenplay by: Jordan Weiss
- Story by: Elyse Hollander; Jordan Weiss
- Based on: Freaky Friday by Mary Rodgers
- Produced by: Kristin Burr; Andrew Gunn; Jamie Lee Curtis
- Starring: Jamie Lee Curtis; Lindsay Lohan; Julia Butters; Sophia Hammons; Manny Jacinto; Mark Harmon
- Cinematography: Matthew Clark
- Edited by: Eleanor Infante
- Music by: Amie Doherty
- Production companies: Walt Disney Pictures; Gunn Films; Burr! Productions
- Distributed by: Walt Disney Studios Motion Pictures
- Release dates: July 22, 2025 (El Capitan Theatre); August 8, 2025 (United States)
- Running time: 111 minutes
- Country: United States
- Language: English
- Budget: $42–45 million
- Box office: $153.2 million

Freakier Friday is a 2025 American fantasy comedy film directed by Nisha Ganatra and written by Jordan Weiss. Produced by Walt Disney Pictures, it is the sequel to Freaky Friday (2003) and is the fifth film in the Freaky Friday franchise. It stars Jamie Lee Curtis, Lindsay Lohan, Julia Butters, Sophia Hammons, Manny Jacinto, and Mark Harmon. In the film, Anna (Lohan) and Tess Coleman (Curtis) swap bodies with Anna's daughter Harper (Butters) and soon-to-be stepdaughter Lily (Hammons) respectively.

The film was announced in 2023. Curtis and Lohan reprised their lead roles from the 2003 film, and were heavily involved in the production. The film includes numerous references to its predecessor as well as other comedies such as Ferris Bueller's Day Off (1986). Filming took place in Los Angeles in summer 2024. While Disney initially planned a direct-to-streaming release, the film was upgraded to a theatrical release at Curtis and Lohan's request.

Freakier Friday premiered at the El Capitan Theatre in Los Angeles on July 22, 2025, and was released theatrically by Walt Disney Studios Motion Pictures on August 8. The film received generally positive reviews from critics and grossed $153 million against a budget of $42–$45 million.

== Plot ==
Twenty-two years after the body swapping incident, (Note: As depicted in Freaky Friday (2003)) a now adult Anna Coleman works as a music producer and raises her teenage daughter Harper as a single parent with the help of her mother Tess. At school, Harper is constantly annoyed by her new classmate Lily Reyes, due to her snobbish personality.

After Harper and Lily cause an incident in chemistry class, Anna is called to the principal's office. When she meets Lily's widowed father Eric, they fall in love and become engaged six months later. The soon-to-be stepsisters are dissatisfied with their predicament; Harper is worried that her mother will relocate them to London, while Lily is adamant to return there so she can attend a fashion academy in honor of her deceased mother.

During Anna's bachelorette party, Anna and Tess and later Harper and Lily have separate palm readings from the supposed psychic Madame Jen, who tells Harper and Lily a fortune about their fractured lives. An earthquake then occurs, which only the four feel. The next morning, they discover that they have switched bodies: Anna with Harper, and Tess with Lily.

The experienced Anna and Tess advise Harper and Lily to pretend to be each other rather than telling anyone about the switch until they can change back. Realizing their new identities could help them break their parents apart, Harper and Lily lie about Madame Jen giving them a reading to delay the reversal. Anna and Tess go to school and spend time in detention for a food fight that Harper and Lily caused at a bake sale, while Harper and Lily enjoy the advantages of being adults and come up with a plan to sabotage the wedding.

At a photoshoot for Anna's client, aspiring singer Ella, Harper and Lily help her overcome her recent breakup. Ella tells them about Anna's former rock star dreams and they find a love song, which they assume Anna wrote about her high school ex-boyfriend Jake Austin. Upon finding him, Harper embarrasses herself when unsuccessfully trying to seduce him in Anna's body.

After escaping detention, Anna and Tess find Madame Jen, who reveals Harper and Lily's fortune but warns them that all four of them need to "change their hearts" in order to change back. Harper, who attends the immigration interview with Eric in Anna's body, realizes how much Eric loves and cares about her mother. Eric also tells her that it would be best for their families to stay in Los Angeles, causing Harper to have second thoughts about ruining their wedding. Lily, however, remains determined, and invites Jake to the rehearsal lunch. She makes a scene in Tess's body, leading to a heated public argument and Eric calling off the wedding. Following a heartfelt conversation with Tess about her homesickness and the loss of her mother, Lily starts to realize the error of her ways.

As Tess, Lily tries to convince her father not to give up on Anna. At the same time, Anna, followed by Harper, is called to Ella's concert, learning that Ella invited Anna's old band, Pink Slip, so they could perform together again. Although happy for the reunion, Anna tells Harper she never regretted giving up her singing aspirations because Harper is the best decision she ever made, revealing that the love song was actually written about her.

Anna and Harper perform the song together on stage, and Tess and Lily arrive in time to see them, with Lily happily stating she wants to be a part of the family. With Harper and Lily's change of hearts complete, they all return to their original bodies. Eric arrives to the concert, and he and Anna rekindle their relationship.

The wedding is held the next day. Sometime later, the family attends the launch event of Tess's latest book. Tess is shocked to learn that Lily, while she was in her step-grandmother's body, took an unflattering picture of her for the book's cover with Tess's lips swollen by an allergic reaction.

== Cast ==
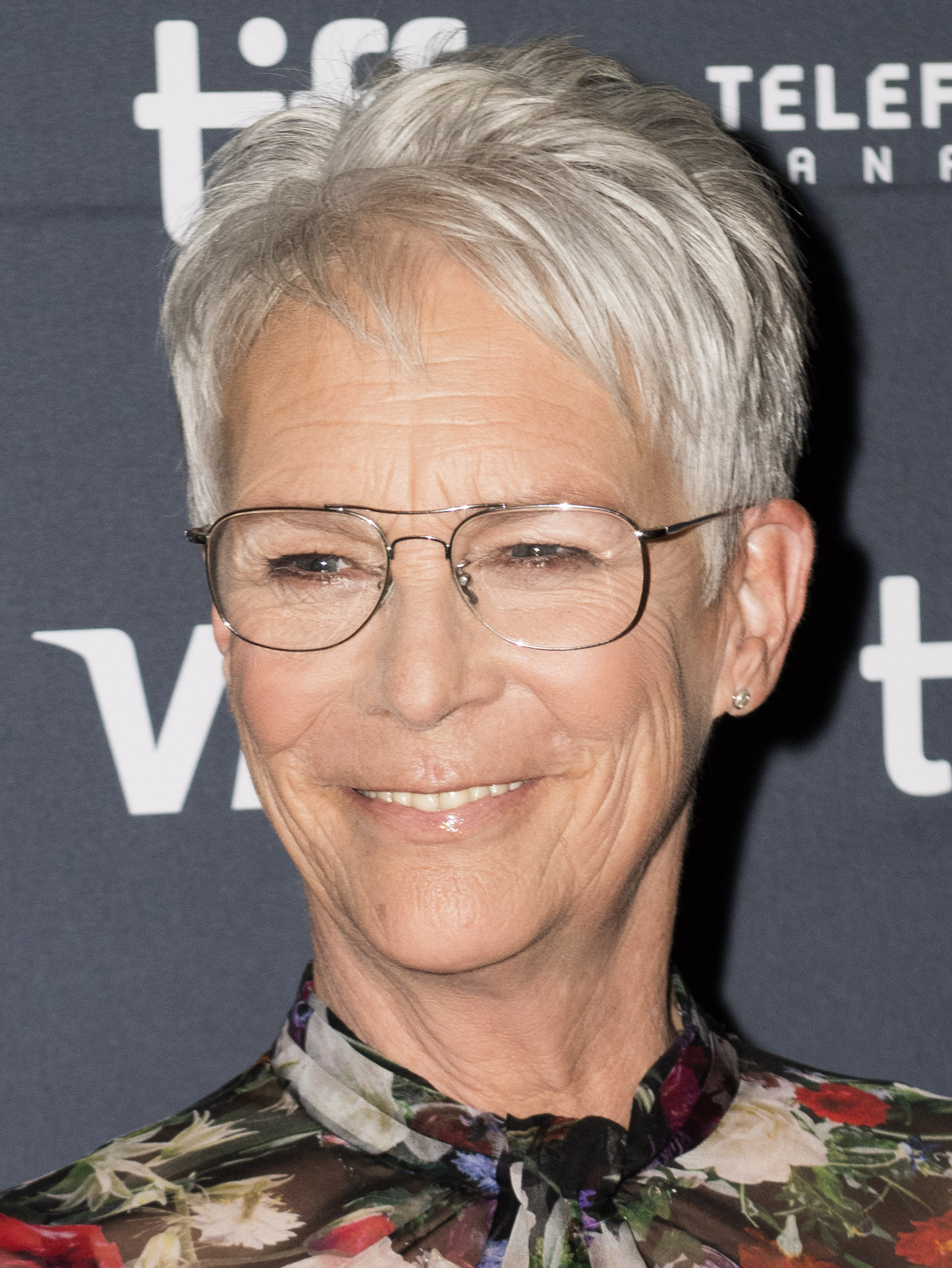
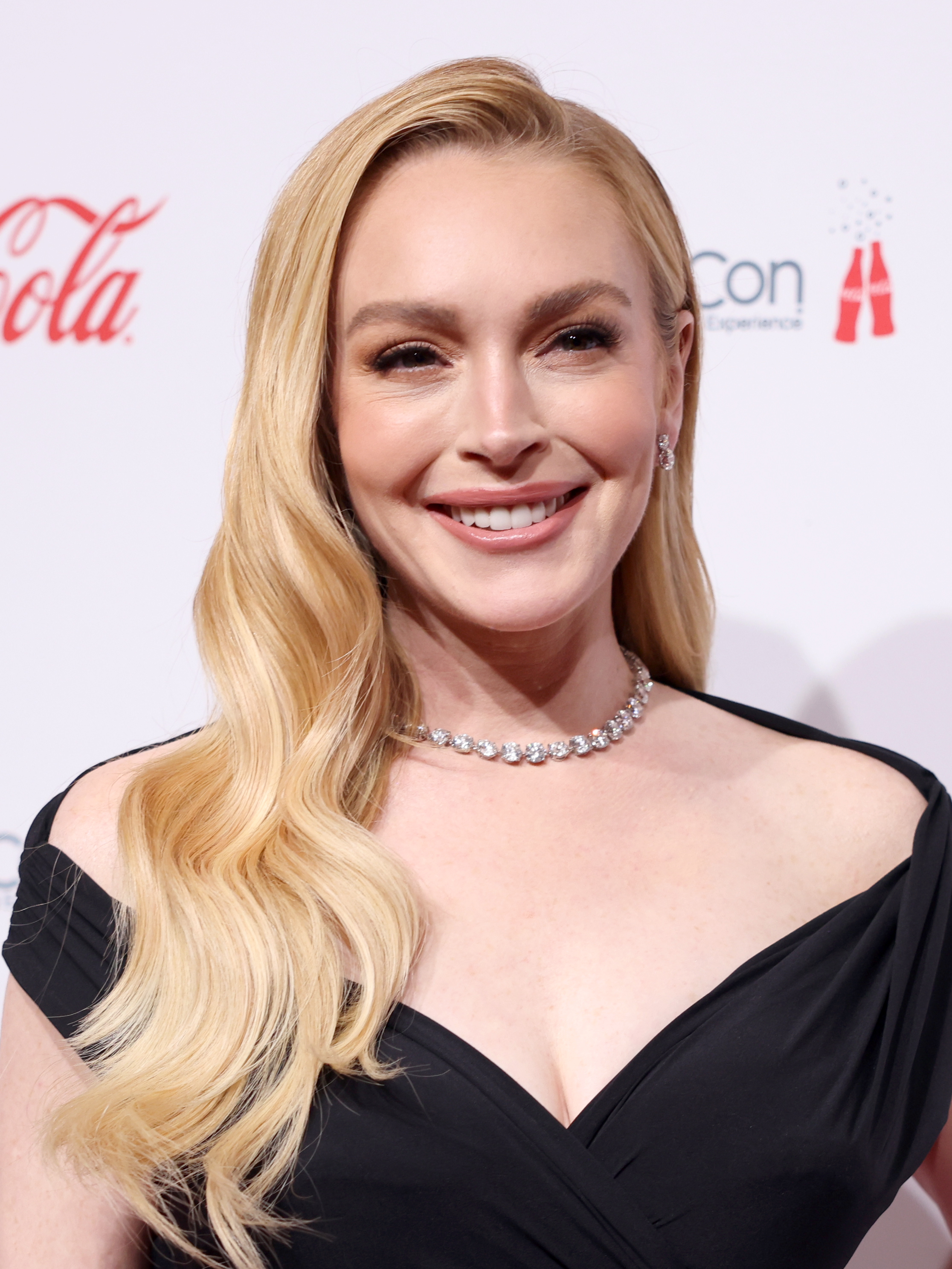
Jamie Lee Curtis (left) and Lindsay Lohan (right) reprise their roles as Tess and Anna
- Jamie Lee Curtis as Tess Coleman/Lily Reyes (in Tess's body), Anna's mother and Harper's grandmother
- Lindsay Lohan as Anna Coleman/Harper Coleman (in Anna's body), Tess's daughter and Harper's mother
- Julia Butters as Harper Coleman/Anna Coleman (in Harper's body), Anna's daughter and Tess's granddaughter
- Sophia Hammons as Lily Reyes/Tess Coleman (in Lily's body), Eric's daughter, Anna's stepdaughter, and Harper's stepsister
- Mark Harmon as Ryan, Tess' husband, Anna and Harry's stepfather, and Harper's grandfather
- Manny Jacinto as Eric Reyes, Anna's new husband, Lily's father, and Harper's stepfather
- Maitreyi Ramakrishnan as Ella, a singer with whom Anna is working
- Christina Vidal as Maddie, one of Anna's best friends, lead singer of the Pink Slip
- Haley Hudson as Peg, one of Anna's best friends, rhythm guitarist of the Pink Slip
- Chad Michael Murray as Jake Austin, Anna's ex-boyfriend
- X Mayo as Principal Waldman, the principal at Harper and Lily's high school
- Lucille Soong as Grandma Chiang, Pei-Pei's mother
- Rosalind Chao as Mama P, a Chinese restaurant owner who helped Tess and Anna previously
- Vanessa Bayer as Madame Jen, a fortune teller
- Jordan E. Cooper as Jett, Anna's assistant
- June Diane Raphael as Veronica, one of the two competitors in the pickleball tournament
- Stephen Tobolowsky as Mr. Elton Bates, Harper and Lily's teacher who previously taught Anna in high school
- Aryan Simhadri as Jai, one of Harper's best friends
- George Wallace as himself, one of the pickleball announcers
- Sherry Cola as herself, George's co-pickleball announcer
- Ryan Malgarini as Harry Coleman, Tess' son, Anna's younger brother, Ryan's stepson, and Harper's uncle
- Chloe Fineman as GiGi, a dance teacher
- Elaine Hendrix as Blake Kale, Ella's publicist

== Production ==
In May 2023, Walt Disney Pictures announced a sequel to the fantasy-comedy film Freaky Friday (2003) was in development, written by Elyse Hollander, with Jamie Lee Curtis and Lindsay Lohan set to reprise their roles as Tess and Anna Coleman, respectively. In March 2024, Lohan confirmed the sequel was in active development, and Nisha Ganatra had been hired to direct the film, with Jordan Weiss rewriting the script. In June 2024, Julia Butters, Manny Jacinto, Sophia Hammons, and Maitreyi Ramakrishnan joined the cast, with Mark Harmon, Chad Michael Murray, Christina Vidal, Haley Hudson, Lucille Soong, Stephen Tobolowsky, and Rosalind Chao reprising their roles from the original film. The following month, Jordan E. Cooper joined the cast. Principal photography began in Los Angeles on June 24, 2024, and finished on August 21. Curtis and Lohan stated that their decades-long friendship and mutual trust were central to producing and making the film happen.

Curtis insisted that the movie be filmed in Los Angeles and the filmmakers considered it a "love letter" to the city, particularly in light of the January 2025 Los Angeles wildfires after many of the filming locations were destroyed. The family house used for both the sequel and the 2003 film burned down, and the production team was able to provide the homeowner with their location-scout photos for insurance claim and FEMA aid. Ganatra talked about getting permission to shoot in the city and being able to showcase certain parts of it she found that had not been previously captured on film: "[LA] has so much diversity, both in the people and places. [...] It was incredible to explore the city, but it then became a sad reality, as much of what we captured has disappeared due to the fires," and spoke of its importance in the film, "LA is her own character, and there are so many versions of LA, but I think for this movie, the right version was all of her. It was about showcasing the beauty, nature, from Downtown to the beaches." The scene featuring Curtis and Lohan driving a Chevrolet Camaro is an homage and recreation of Ferris Bueller's Day Off. Furthermore, Ganatra was inspired by her love for Lucille Ball and physical comedy. Ferris Bueller's Day Off, along with "a lot of the films from the 80s, 90s, and early 2000s," also influenced the lensing used, with Ganatra detailing: "We even went with the 1.85:1 aspect ratio because I wanted it to feel like the classic studio films that we grew up with. There's a little more grain in the lenses, so you feel like it's new and nostalgic all at the same time." The wedding dance rehearsal scene, inspired by Dirty Dancing, was developed after Jacinto suggested adding a first dance moment, drawing on his dance background.

The film's official title was announced by Curtis and Lohan at the 2024 D23: The Ultimate Disney Fan Event on August 9. In January 2025, it was revealed that Vanessa Bayer joined the cast. Following the release of the teaser trailer, it was disclosed Elaine Hendrix, who had previously starred in Disney's 1998 remake of The Parent Trap alongside Lohan, would also be appearing in the film. Eleanor Infante edited the film. Disney initially planned to produce the film for a direct-to-streaming release, but Curtis and Lohan pushed for a theatrical rollout, with Curtis revealing she pointed to the strong audience reception of Barbie (2023) to help persuade executives. Ganatra addressed the need to update the 2003 film's Asian representation, which was viewed as "problematic," explaining, "There were some stereotypes that were hurtful." While Chao and Soong both returned for the sequel, they are not involved in the body swapping: "It was a different time and wasn't done intentionally [in the 2003 film], but it's a real thing. It's something I, being Asian, was super conscious of." Ganatra said the scene featuring Lohan and Curtis on a beach was unscripted. She talked about directing the actresses, saying: "Comedies get a lot of flak for not being serious films, but the acting that those four actors are doing is really sophisticated. Then directing it is confusing, because it's eight different characters with the same four actors." She noted that they coordinated rehearsals and worked with the costume and production designers to ensure each character's identity was clear, reflecting their individual style, while the actors helped each other capture one another's mannerisms.

Freakier Friday marked Lohan's first Walt Disney feature since 2005's Herbie: Fully Loaded, following her debut with the studio in 1998 and multiple other projects in subsequent years. The film includes several references to the 2003 film as well as Lohan's other movies. The American indie pop band Muna makes a cameo appearance as part of the fictional artist Ella's band. Producer Kristin Burr stated that the fictional band Pink Slip was always intended to be featured in the sequel due to its long-lasting impact and meaningful role in the 2003 film's story. However, there was debate over whether Lohan's character and Muna would be a part of the band, with the decision ultimately made to retain all of the original members. Two of the Pink Slip members, Hudson and Danny Rubin, decided to form their own real-life band after reconnecting for the sequel.

== Music ==
In March 2025, it was announced that Amie Doherty would compose the film's score, after previously collaborating with Ganatra on The High Note (2020). Doherty detailed, "I think 29 tracks on the soundtrack aren't score. There's everything on there from the Spice Girls to Chappell Roan, some really nostalgic pieces mixed with very modern pieces." She elaborated that the songs were meant to establish and reference the "older two characters and the younger two in this movie, so the score was there to help with the emotional beats, first and foremost." The score blends punk-rock influences, orchestral themes recorded with a live string ensemble in Los Angeles, and modern electronic elements to create a unified musical palette inspired partly by the fictional band Pink Slip from the 2003 film. On July 11, 2025, a new version of the song "Take Me Away" by Pink Slip was released by Hollywood Records as a single for Freakier Friday. A previous version of the song appeared in Freaky Friday. The full soundtrack was released by Hollywood Records on August 1, 2025. It features three different renditions of an original song performed by Lohan titled "Baby", and a cover of "Ultimate", which she had originally recorded for the 2003 film, by Canadian rock band The Beaches.

== Release ==
=== Theatrical ===
Freakier Friday had its world premiere at the El Capitan Theatre in Los Angeles on July 22, 2025, and was released theatrically in the United States on August 8. Internationally, the film was first released in selected territories on August 6, 2025. It was followed by Taiwan on August 21, and by Japan on September 5.

=== Home media ===
Walt Disney Studios Home Entertainment released Freakier Friday for digital download on October 7, 2025. The film was released on Blu-ray and DVD on November 11, and was made available for streaming on Disney+ the following day. The home media release includes deleted scenes and featurettes.

Disney+, which compiles its daily "Top 10" list of the platform's most-watched titles by tracking daily views for movies and episodes while factoring in the popularity of newly released content, listed Freakier Friday as the most-streamed title on the platform in the United States the day after its release. Nielsen Media Research, which records streaming viewership on U.S. television screens, calculated that the film was streamed for 374 million minutes from November 10–16, making it the fifth most-streamed film that week.

== Reception ==
=== Box office ===
Freakier Friday has grossed $94.2 million in the United States and Canada, and $59 million in other territories, for a worldwide total of $153 million.

In the United States and Canada, Freakier Friday was released to 3,975 theaters during its opening weekend. It earned $3.1 million from Wednesday and Thursday preview screenings. The film debuted to $28.6 million, finishing second behind Weapons for two consecutive weekends. It was reported that the film earned nearly $45 million in its opening weekend worldwide and had the biggest August debut ever for a PG-rated movie. The film dropped to third place in its third weekend, grossing $8.8 million. In November 2025, Ganatra reacted to the film's financial success as "so exciting," saying that once it surpassed the box office benchmark Disney had set she felt new opportunities were starting to open in ways rarely available to female filmmakers. It was the highest-grossing comedy movie at the domestic box office in 2025.

=== Critical response ===
Metacritic review
breakdown (unweighted)

Positive
22 (52%)
Mixed
20 (48%)
Negative
0 (0%)

On the review aggregator website Rotten Tomatoes, 73% of 227 critics' reviews are positive, with an average rating of 6.3/10. The website's consensus reads: "Freakier Friday doesn't reinvent the original's story so much as it swaps the formula around for a frothy good time, with Jamie Lee Curtis and Lindsay Lohan easily slipping back into roles that fit them like mixed-and-matched gloves." Metacritic, which uses a weighted average, assigned the film a score of 60 out of 100, based on 42 critics, indicating "mixed or average" reviews. Audiences polled by CinemaScore gave the film an average grade of "A" on an A+ to F scale, up from the 2003 film's "A-."

Maureen Lee Lenker of Entertainment Weekly gave the film an A− and described it as "a heart-on-its-sleeve ode to strengthening and forging bonds, the power of deep and unconditional love, and the warmth and safety of one's chosen family, most especially when it's at its freakiest." Time Out's Olly Richards gave the film three stars out of five and wrote, "There are almost endless holes you could pick in its logic and storytelling, but it gives you few reasons to want to. This Friday's freakier, but it's kind of... funner too." Writing for IndieWire, Kate Erbland stated: "Leave it to Jamie Lee Curtis and Lindsay Lohan to crack the code as to what makes a good legacyquel, which they've done quite handily," calling it "charming and quite fun," crediting the "actual verve, obvious joy, and performances that are about three times better than they need to be," while positively comparing it to the 2003 film. TheWrap's William Bibbiani similarly declared that it "is the best kind of legacy sequel. It harkens back to what made the original work without literally doing the same thing all over again," continuing that it "reunites a great cast and gives the new stars just as much time to shine," concluding that "it's still sweet, it's still funny, it's still freaky, and it's still Friday. Thank God."

Kevin Maher of The Times wrote: "There is, to repeat, a lot going on here. But one of the delights of Jordan Weiss's hugely ambitious screenplay is that everything, somehow, makes loose sense," praising the performances of Curtis and Lohan who "excel at 'being' teens together, complete with exaggerated mannerisms and cartoonish facial expressions." Paste's Matt Goldberg also complimented the duo, saying, "Curtis and Lohan haven't missed a beat in their comic chemistry," adding, "Rather than an attempt at some lofty reinvention, Ganatra's take is more of a reunion tour where we bop our heads along to the familiar tunes," assessing that the film "understands why we keep coming back to this silly dynamic." Tim Robey of The Daily Telegraph gave the film a scoring of three out of five, stating that "the film is an Etch-a-Sketch wiped clean; unobjectionable fun, if a trifle anodyne." Owen Gleiberman of Variety commented that "none of these characters, after the swap, seem different enough from themselves to allow the comedy to detonate," but "the double swap lends Freakier Friday a juggling-balls-in-the-air quality that gives off a pleasant hum" and "it's fun to ride the film's complications," calling it "rather touching."

Angie Martoccio reviewed the film for Rolling Stone, writing that, "against all odds, it's actually kind of great [...] Freakier Friday is a charming love letter to Lohan and her generation, and marks the actress' official comeback." Amy Nicholson of the Los Angeles Times wrote that it "won't trade places with the original in audience's hearts. But this disposable delight will at least allow fans who've grown up alongside Lohan to take their own offspring to the theater and bond about what the series means to them." Alissa Wilkinson of the New York Times observed that, by the middle of the film, it struggles to maintain "the narrative tension to keep things interesting" and the swaps become confusing, pointing out that, "To its credit, the movie ends in a satisfying place that echoes its predecessor" and determining the film "works best if you're there for the memories." Meanwhile, Stephanie Zacharek of Time said that the movie "appears to exist largely for one reason: to grift off the fondness many adults have for the original, even though the sequel has none of that picture's breezy, observant charm."

=== Accolades ===
| Award | Date of ceremony | Category | Recipient(s) | Result | Ref. |
|---|---|---|---|---|---|
| Nickelodeon Kids' Choice Awards | November 14, 2026 | Favorite On-Screen Duo/Trio | Jamie Lee Curtis and Lindsay Lohan | Nominated | |
| The ReFrame Stamp | March 25, 2026 | Gender-Balanced Production | Freakier Friday | Won | |
| Saturn Awards | March 8, 2026 | Best Fantasy Film | Freakier Friday | Nominated | |
| Set Decorators Society of America Awards | February 21, 2026 | Best Achievement in Décor/Design of a Comedy or Musical Feature Film | Set Decoration by Brandi Kalish SDSA; Production Design by Kay Anna Lee | Nominated | |

== Possible sequel ==
Curtis and Lohan stated during the press tour for the film that they would be willing to make another sequel, tentatively titled Freakiest Friday, suggesting that it could happen "sooner" than another 20 years. Ganatra also said that she would "do anything" to work with the cast again and teased a "six-way swap", while emphasizing that any future project would be up to Curtis and Lohan. In November 2025, Lohan stated they had discussed the possibility of a third film, but suggested it might not happen for some time. Curtis then indicated that it was unlikely to be produced in the near future due to age considerations for herself and the younger cast in terms of the story's timeline.
