= Jordan Weiss =

American writer and producer (born 1993)

- Born: January 28, 1993 (age 32); United States
- Occupation(s): Writer, director, producer
- Notable work: Dollface; Freakier Friday

Jordan Weiss (born January 28, 1993) is an American writer, director and producer.

== Career ==
She created and produced the Hulu series Dollface starring Kat Dennings, which premiered in November 2019. Weiss wrote the script for Dollface shortly after graduating from USC School of Cinematic Arts.

In November 2018, it was reported that Weiss was writing a narrative adaptation of the documentary Science Fair for Universal Pictures and Elizabeth Banks' Brownstone Productions. In July 2022, it was announced that Weiss would be making her feature directorial debut in the romantic comedy Sweethearts, having co-written the screenplay with Dan Brier. It premiered at the SCAD Savannah Film Festival on October 31, 2024, and released on Max on November 28, 2024. In March 2024, The Hollywood Reporter revealed Weiss had written the screenplay for Freakier Friday, the sequel to Disney's 2003 film starring Jamie Lee Curtis and Lindsay Lohan which was filmed that summer and directed by Nisha Ganatra. It released in theaters on August 8, 2025. Weiss is also adapting Curtis Sittenfeld's novel Romantic Comedy for New Line Cinema and Hello Sunshine.

== Writing credits ==
- Dollface (2019–2022)
- Harley Quinn (Episode: "A Seat at the Table", 2020)
- Sweethearts (2024, also director)
- Freakier Friday (2025)
