= Freaky Friday (2018 film) =

2018 television film

- Promotional poster
- Genre: Musical
- Based on: Freaky Friday by Bridget Carpenter: Freaky Friday by Mary Rodgers
- Written by: Bridget Carpenter
- Directed by: Steve Carr
- Starring: Cozi Zuehlsdorff; Heidi Blickenstaff
- Composers: Tom Kitt; Brian Yorkey; David Lawrence
- Country of origin: United States
- Original language: English

Production
- Executive producers: Thomas Schumacher; Steve Carr; Susan Cartsonis
- Producer: Lisa Towers
- Cinematography: Adam Santelli
- Editor: Craig Herring
- Running time: 90 minutes
- Production companies: Disney Branded Television; Bad Angels Productions

Original release
- Network: Disney Channel
- Release: August 10, 2018

Freaky Friday is an American musical fantasy comedy television film that premiered as a Disney Channel Original Movie on August 10, 2018. Based on the 1972 book and its 2016 stage adaptation, Freaky Friday is the fourth feature film installment in the franchise. It stars Cozi Zuehlsdorff and Heidi Blickenstaff.

== Plot ==
The film starts off with Ellie and her two friends, Karl and Monica, discussing an annual school-wide scavenger hunt. Ellie's brother Fletcher comes in and does a magic trick, but she is unimpressed. Fletcher steals an hourglass that Ellie's late father had given to her. Meanwhile, Katherine Blake is preparing for her impending wedding to her fiancé Mike. Katherine wishes that Ellie would take more responsibility for herself, while Ellie wishes her mother would understand what it is like to be her. When Katherine follows Ellie to her room they fight over the hourglass and switch bodies. They must find the identical hourglass given to Katherine, but Katherine sold hers. Katherine goes to Ellie's school and Ellie stays at the house.

The bulk of the film deals with the comic fallout resulting from the body-switching. Katherine (as Ellie) deals with bullying from mean girl Savannah and commiserates with Ellie's crush Adam, while Ellie (as Katherine) does her best to prepare for the wedding. At the same time, they discover that the missing hourglass has been purchased as an item for the school scavenger hunt.

"Ellie" takes Fletcher on a walk and tells him that parents lie and he will never go to Vegas. He becomes upset and runs away. Adam finds Fletcher and convinces him to return home. Adam then says that he might consider putting the hourglass on the list.

"Katherine" tells Mike she loves him and resolves to treat Fletcher better. "Ellie" obtains the hourglass in a fight with Savannah and wins the hunt. She then goes to the wedding and attempts to switch bodies with the real Ellie, but it does not work. The wedding starts, but she stops it and declares how much she loves Katherine, which causes them to switch back and they reconcile.

== Cast ==
- Cozi Zuehlsdorff as Ellie Blake/Katherine Blake in Ellie's body
- Heidi Blickenstaff as Katherine Blake/Ellie Blake in Katherine's body
- Jason Maybaum as Fletcher Blake, Katherine's son and Ellie's little brother
- Alex Désert as Mike Harper, Katherine's fiancée and Fletcher & Ellie's stepfather
- Ricky He as Adam Liu, Ellie's crush and this year's List Master for The Hunt
- Kahyun Kim as Torrey Min, Katherine's personal assistant and wedding planner
- Dara Renee as Savannah, Ellie's arch emeny
- Isaiah Lehtinen as Karl Carlson, one of Ellie's best friends
- Jennifer Laporte as Monica Yang, one of Ellie's best friends
- Marlowe Percival (credited as Sarah Willey) as Kitty, Savannah's friend
- Rukiya Bernard as Danielle the Journalist
- Joshua Pak as Luis the Photographer
- Lauren McGibbon as Ms. Meyers
- Dave Hurtubise as Mr. Blumen
- Gary Jones as Principal Ehrin
- Paula Burrows as Mrs. Luckenbill
- Jag Arneja as Señor O'Brien

== Production ==
The film is based on the 1972 novel Freaky Friday by Mary Rodgers, and Disney's stage adaptation of the novel. Heidi Blickenstaff reprises her role as the mother, Katherine Blake, from the stage version, and Cozi Zuehlsdorff plays the daughter, Ellie Blake. Steve Carr serves as director and executive producer, Bridget Carpenter serves as screenwriter, Tom Kitt and Brian Yorkey serve as composers, Susan Cartsonis and Thomas Schumacher serve as executive producers, and John Carrafa serves as choreographer. The film premiered on Disney Channel on August 10, 2018.

== Reception ==
=== Critical response ===
IndieWire rated the movie A−, stating, "In the case of Disney Channel’s latest adaptation, dusting off “Freaky Friday” to reimagine it as a full-blown, Broadway-inflected musical is more than worth the effort thanks to its talented cast, infectious songs, and lively musical numbers." Common Sense Media rated the movie 4 stars out of 5, indicating, "Musical reboot's heartwarming themes are great for families."

=== Ratings ===
During its premiere in the 8:00 PM time slot, Freaky Friday attracted a total of 1.58 million viewers with a 0.29 rating for people aged 18–49, making it the lowest-rated Disney Channel Original Movie premiere of the last decade, until the premiere of Kim Possible in 2019. Over the course of seven telecasts during the first three days of airing, the film attracted a total of 7.2 million viewers, including 3.1 million among kids 6–14.
