= Ryan Malgarini =

American actor (born 1992)

- Born: Ryan Timothy Malgarini; June 12, 1992 (age 34); Renton, Washington, U.S.
- Other name: Ryan T. Malgarini
- Occupation: Actor
- Years active: 1997–present
- Partner(s): Kristen Stubbe (2022–present; engaged)

Ryan Timothy Malgarini (born June 12, 1992) is an American actor, best known for his role as Harry Coleman in Freaky Friday (2003) and its sequel Freakier Friday (2025). Other credits include The United States of Leland (2003), The Polar Express (2004), Go Figure (2005), How to Eat Fried Worms (2006), Mike & Molly (2011), and Teen Wolf (2016).

== Early life ==
Malgarini was born June 12, 1992 in Renton, Washington, U.S. His paternal grandmother was actress Gloria (née Grey) Malgarini.

== Career ==
In 2002, Malgarini made his film debut in The United States of Leland (2003), playing a six year old boy in flashback scenes. This was a rather challenging role for Malgarini, since it required him to weep for the first time on screen in a funeral scene. In 2003, he played the role of Harry Coleman, starring alongside Jamie Lee Curtis and Lindsay Lohan in Disney's comedy hit Freaky Friday. He appeared with Tom Hanks in a test film to develop the "performance capture" technology for The Polar Express (2004).

Malgarini appeared as Benjy in How to Eat Fried Worms, from the beloved gross out children's novel by Thomas Rockwell. According to an interview with Malgarini on his official site, he starred as the main character Ugly in the musical Honk!. He appeared in The Robinsons: Lost in Space in 2004, and in Gary Unmarried as Gary's (Jay Mohr) son Tom.

Malgarini also appeared in Go Figure in 2005, and guest starred in the CBS sitcom Mike & Molly (2011).

As of 2021, Malgarini works as an acting coach for The AFA Studio in Toluca Lake, California.

In 2025, Malgarini reprised his role of Harry Coleman in the Freaky Friday sequel film Freakier Friday.

== Personal life ==
Malgarini began dating Kristen Stubbe in September 2022. They became engaged on December 18, 2024 after two years of dating.

== Filmography ==
Year	Title	Role	Notes
2003	The United States of Leland	Young Leland	
2003	Gilmore Girls	Fred Larson Jr.	Episode: A Tale of Poes and Fire
2003	Freaky Friday	Harry Coleman	
2003	The Big Wide World of Carl Laemke	Billy Laemke	Television movie
2004	Malcolm in the Middle	Noah	Episode: Hot Tub
2004	The Robinsons: Lost in Space	Will Robinson	Television short
2005	Go Figure	Bradley Kingsford	Television movie
2006	How to Eat Fried Worms	Benjy	
2006	Standoff	Tyler Keeslar	Episode: Pilot
2008	Happy Campers		Television movie
2008–2010	Gary Unmarried	Tom Brooks	Main role
2011	Mike & Molly	Matt Dalton	Episode: Christmas Break
2012	Harry's Law	Scott Denchy	Episode: Search and Seize
2013	Riddle	Nathan Teller	
2013	Bones	Dale	Episode: The Party in the Pants
2014	Oliver, Stoned	Devon	
2014	The Young Kieslowski	Brian Kieslowski	
2014	I Didn't Do It	Alex	Episode: Ball or Nothing
2015	Resident Advisors	Beep Hutcherson	Episode: Move in Day
2015	Fresh Off the Boat	Mike	Episode: Miracle on Dead Street
2016	Teen Wolf	Trent	2 episodes
2018	Mom	Brendan	Episode: Pudding and a Screen Door
2019	Dinner in America	Daniel	
2025	Freakier Friday	Harry Coleman	

== Awards and nominations ==
Year	Award	Category	Work	Result	Ref.
2004	Young Artist Awards	Best Performance in a Feature Film - Young Actor Age Ten or Younger	Freaky Friday	Nominated	
2007	Young Artist Awards	Best Performance in a Feature Film - Young Ensemble Cast	How to Eat Fried Worms	Won	
2009	Young Artist Awards	Best Performance in a TV Series (Comedy or Drama) - Supporting Young Actor	Gary Unmarried	Nominated	
2010	Young Artist Awards	Best Performance in a TV Series (Comedy or Drama) - Supporting Young Actor	Gary Unmarried	Won	
2012	Young Artist Awards	Best Performance in a TV Series - Guest Starring Young Actor 18-21	Mike & Molly	Won	
