= Kristin Burr =

American film producer

- Occupation: Film producer
- Years active: 1997–present

Kristin Burr is an American film producer. She first worked at Walt Disney Pictures as an executive, before working as a producer in films such as Christopher Robin (2018) and Cruella (2021). She created her own production company, Burr! Productions, in 2017, where she has a first-look studio deal with Lionsgate.

== Career ==
Kristin Burr joined Walt Disney Pictures in 1997 as a Creative Executive. Prior to her transition into producing in 2017, Burr held the title of Executive Vice President of Production under President Sean Bailey. During her 20-year tenure at the studio, Burr oversaw the development of films such as the Touchstone Pictures romantic comedy Sweet Home Alabama starring Reese Witherspoon, and The Proposal starring Sandra Bullock and Ryan Reynolds; Christopher Nolan's period drama The Prestige with Hugh Jackman and Christian Bale; the comedy Bringing Down the House with Steve Martin and Queen Latifah; Wes Anderson's The Life Aquatic; and the remake Freaky Friday with Jamie Lee Curtis and Lindsay Lohan. After Disney's acquisition of The Muppets in 2004, she oversaw the development on productions based on the franchise for Disney including 2011's The Muppets starring Jason Segel and Amy Adams. One of her final projects at Disney was the musical Mary Poppins Returns, a sequel to Disney's 1964 film Mary Poppins, directed by Rob Marshall, starring Emily Blunt, Lin-Manuel Miranda and Meryl Streep.

In 2017, Burr departed to head up her own production company, "Burr! Productions" which launched with Marc Forster's Christopher Robin, a live-action follow-up to Disney's Winnie the Pooh franchise starring Ewan McGregor in the title role of A. A. Milne's fairy-tale character. The project was developed after Burr convinced co-producer Brigham Taylor, who originally pitched the project to Disney in 2003, to restart development on the film. The film was released on August 3, 2018, and earned US$150 million worldwide after its first month. Next Burr produced Dora and the Lost City of Gold for Paramount Pictures, based on Nickelodeon's animated series Dora the Explorer. The film was directed by James Bobin, with whom Burr previously collaborated on his The Muppets films while at Disney. It received generally positive reviews and was commercially successful.

Burr produced Jingle Jangle a Netflix Christmas musical with music by John Legend and an all-black cast including Oscar-winner Forest Whitaker and Keegan-Michael Key, released in November 2020. Cruella, released in May 2021, is an origin story for 101 Dalmatians villain Cruella DeVil, starring Emma Stone. In 2022 she produced the comedy The Unbearable Weight of Massive Talent starring Nicolas Cage and Pedro Pascal. Burr also produced Batgirl, starring Leslie Grace, for HBO Max, which was pulled from release and shelved.

Burr has a first-look deal at Lionsgate and is developing feature adaptations of novels including The Guncle by Steven Rowley, who previously wrote Lily and the Octopus, and The Kiss Quotient by Helen Hoang.

== Filmography ==
Executive producer

- Ice Princess (2005)

Producer

- Christopher Robin (2018)
- Dora and the Lost City of Gold (2019)
- Jingle Jangle: A Christmas Journey (2020)
- Cruella (2021)
- The Unbearable Weight of Massive Talent (2022)
- Dora and the Search for Sol Dorado (2025)
- Freakier Friday (2025)
- Tangled (2028)
- Batgirl (unreleased)
