= Freaky Friday (2003 film) =

Film by Mark Waters

- Theatrical release poster with original release date
- Directed by: Mark Waters
- Screenplay by: Heather Hach; Leslie Dixon
- Based on: Freaky Friday by Mary Rodgers
- Produced by: Andrew Gunn
- Starring: Jamie Lee Curtis; Lindsay Lohan; Harold Gould; Chad Michael Murray; Mark Harmon
- Cinematography: Oliver Wood
- Edited by: Bruce Green
- Music by: Rolfe Kent
- Production companies: Walt Disney Pictures; Gunn Films
- Distributed by: Buena Vista Pictures Distribution
- Release dates: August 4, 2003 (Los Angeles); August 6, 2003 (United States)
- Running time: 97 minutes
- Country: United States
- Language: English
- Budget: $26 million
- Box office: $160.8 million

Freaky Friday is a 2003 American fantasy comedy film directed by Mark Waters and written by Heather Hach and Leslie Dixon. It is based on the 1972 novel by Mary Rodgers and marks the third film adaptation of the novel, as well as the third installment overall in the Freaky Friday franchise. The film stars Jamie Lee Curtis and Lindsay Lohan as a mother and daughter who inadvertently switch bodies through the magic of Chinese fortune cookies. The supporting cast includes Harold Gould, Chad Michael Murray, and Mark Harmon.

Freaky Friday was released theatrically by Walt Disney Pictures on August 6, 2003. It was a commercial success, grossing over $160 million worldwide against a production budget of $26 million. The film received largely positive reviews from critics, in particular for the performances of Lohan and Curtis, the latter being nominated for the Golden Globe Award for Best Actress in a Motion Picture – Musical or Comedy. A sequel titled Freakier Friday was released in 2025, with Curtis, Lohan, Murray, and Harmon returning.

== Plot ==
Aspiring teenage musician Anna Coleman lives with her widowed psychiatrist mother Tess, younger brother Harry, and grandfather Alan. Tess is engaged to Ryan Volvo, whom Anna has not accepted, as she has not fully reconciled with her father's death three years earlier. At school, Anna deals with unfair teachers, bullying from her former best friend Stacey Hinkhouse, and her crush on Jake, whom her mother disapproves of. Pink Slip, the band Anna plays lead guitar in, is scheduled to audition for a spot in Wango Tango at the House of Blues, but Anna is prohibited from attending as the audition falls on the same night as Tess's wedding rehearsal. While dining at Pei-Pei's Chinese restaurant, Anna and Tess get into a heated argument, which is interrupted when Pei-Pei's mother gives them fortune cookies. Anna and Tess end up on separate sides of a bathroom door and read their fortunes aloud simultaneously before feeling an intense earthquake, to which the rest of the restaurant is oblivious.

The next morning, Anna and Tess wake up in each other's bodies. Tess goes to school as Anna and begins to fully understand her daughter's woes. She realizes that Anna's English teacher, Mr. Elton Bates, is targeting her out of spite because Tess rejected his prom invitation decades earlier. Tess intervenes, threatening to report him to the school board unless he ends his mistreatment of Anna. Meanwhile, Anna has difficulty handling her mother's clients and the stress of her upcoming wedding. The two return to the restaurant where Pei-Pei tells them that only showing selfless love towards each other will reverse the switch.

Anna attends Harry's parent-teacher conference, where she reads his composition about how much he actually admires Anna and decides to be nicer to him. Tess attempts to make amends with Stacey, but gets sent to detention when Stacey frames her for cheating on a test, finally demonstrating to Tess how cruel and mean-spirited Anna's former friend has become. When Jake notices her sneaking out of detention, he offers to help her finish the test. Tess realizes that she misjudged him, but ends up putting him off Anna after she vandalizes Stacey's test as revenge for bullying Anna by erasing most of the answers and writing "I'M STUPID!" on it. Meanwhile, Ryan surprises Tess with a talk show interview to discuss her latest book. As Anna herself has not read it, she instead goes into an amusing tirade about getting older. Tess and Jake watch the interview and while she is embarrassed, he is impressed. Anna later bumps into Jake at his job, and they bond over music.

At the rehearsal dinner, Anna's bandmates Maddie and Peg try to convince her to sneak off to the audition, but they are caught by security. Ryan gives Anna permission to go in hopes of winning her acceptance, and encourages Tess to support the band. Since Tess cannot play, Anna plays the guitar backstage while Tess mimes along. Finally realizing the full scope of Anna's musical talents, Tess promises to regard her daughter's ambitions and passions with more respect. Jake again becomes enamored with Anna upon seeing her perform. Back at the rehearsal dinner, Tess tells Anna to ask Ryan to postpone the wedding until the switch is reversed. Anna instead proposes a toast, finally accepting Ryan after understanding how happy he makes her mother. This triggers an earthquake within the venue, during which Anna and Tess return to their original bodies.

Tess and Ryan later marry, and Tess finally allows Anna to start dating Jake. Pink Slip performs during the reception. When Harry and Alan start arguing, Pei-Pei's mother gives them fortune cookies, but Pei-Pei tackles the pair before they can open them.

== Cast ==
- Jamie Lee Curtis as Tess Coleman / Anna Coleman (in Tess's body)
- Lindsay Lohan as Anna Coleman / Tess Coleman (in Anna's body)
- Mark Harmon as Ryan, Tess's fiancé
- Harold Gould as Alan, Tess's father and Anna's grandfather
- Chad Michael Murray as Jake Austin, Anna's love interest
- Stephen Tobolowsky as Mr. Elton Bates, Anna's high school English teacher
- Christina Vidal as Maddie, Anna's bandmate
- Ryan Malgarini as Harry Coleman, Tess's 9-year-old son, Anna's younger brother and Alan's grandson
- Haley Hudson as Peg, Anna's other bandmate
- Rosalind Chao as Pei-Pei Chiang, a Chinese restaurant manager
- Lucille Soong as Mrs. Chiang, Pei-Pei's mother
- Willie Garson as Evan, Tess's patient
- Dina Waters as Dottie Robertson, the TV host
- Julie Gonzalo as Stacey Hinkhouse, Anna's former friend
- Marc McClure as Boris
- Mary Ellen Trainor as Diary Reading Patient
- Cayden Boyd as Harry's friend

== Production ==
=== Development ===
The concept for a remake of Freaky Friday (1976) originated when producer Andrew Gunn met with Buena Vista Motion Pictures Group president Nina Jacobson to discuss potential projects. Gunn proposed either a new adaptation of Freaky Friday or a reboot of Witch Mountain. Though Jacobson was initially hesitant due to a 1995 ABC remake of Freaky Friday, she ultimately agreed. Gunn, The Walt Disney Company executive Kristin Burr, and screenwriter Heather Hach began discussing potential ideas, eventually gaining support after the success of The Princess Diaries (2001), which proved that female-led, family-focused films could be commercially viable. Director Mark Waters joined the project after a meeting with Gunn and Burr, despite initial doubts about the quality of the script. He responded positively to the concept and had personal fondness for the original film.

The early draft of the screenplay depicted a psychiatrist mother and a daughter who wrote for her school newspaper and aspired to interview Gwen Stefani at the House of Blues. Waters revised the characters into a straight-laced mother and a rebellious, alt-rock daughter, believing their contrast would make the premise more compelling. Lindsay Lohan's character was originally written as goth, but she felt the persona was too alienating and auditioned in a preppy style. The character was ultimately rewritten as a grunge-influenced teen. Lohan later stated that the character’s revised punk-leaning style and attitude were influenced by pop-punk singer Avril Lavigne, whom she cited as a key reference for Anna Coleman’s look and persona.

Amir Derakh served as the film's guitar consultant, coaching Jamie Lee Curtis and rehearsing with the fictional band members. While Lohan trained for a year to learn the guitar, the final film used overdubbed performances by studio musicians.

=== Casting ===
Initially, Andrew Gunn hoped to cast Jodie Foster—who played the daughter in the 1976 version—as the mother, but she declined. Annette Bening and Michelle Trachtenberg were cast as the leads, but both exited due to scheduling conflicts, with Bening reportedly anxious about the script. Curtis was ultimately cast four days before production began, after Jacobson recommended her based on her performance in True Lies (1994). Curtis initially nearly declined due to being a parent. Lohan's audition was reported to be underwhelming, but her prior success in The Parent Trap (1998) and strong chemistry with Curtis secured her the role. Other actresses considered for the role of Anna included Mischa Barton, Kristen Stewart, Mae Whitman, Evan Rachel Wood, Brie Larson, Emmy Rossum, Kristen Bell, Shiri Appleby, and Danielle Panabaker.

Chad Michael Murray was cast as Jake based on his audition with Lohan, during which he deliberately aimed to make her feel the character's intended discomfort. Jared Padalecki also auditioned for the part. Rosalind Chao was cast as Pei-Pei and based her performance on her father, who ran a Chinese restaurant in Orange County, California. She later addressed criticism over her use of a Chinese accent, explaining it was modeled on her father's real speech pattern.

Kelly Osbourne was originally cast as Maddie but withdrew after her mother Sharon's cancer diagnosis. She was replaced by Christina Vidal. Other actresses who auditioned for members of the fictional band Pink Slip included Raven-Symoné, Naya Rivera, Ashley Tisdale, Gwen Stefani, Sophia Bush, and Kat Dennings. Vidal, Lohan, and Haley Hudson rehearsed at a North Hollywood studio in preparation for their roles.

Tom Selleck was initially cast as Ryan, but left the project after Bening's departure. Mark Harmon was later cast in the role. Ryan Malgarini was selected for the role of Harry after auditioning with his grandparents. He was the only child actor given a full script before auditioning and was chosen over Spencer Breslin, Angus T. Jones, and Daryl Sabara.

Marc McClure, who played Annabel's love interest in the 1976 film, appears in a cameo role as Boris the delivery man. Additional cameos include Lindsay Lohan's mother, Dina Lohan, and director Mark Waters.

=== Filming ===
Filming took place between October and December 2002.

== Soundtrack ==
The orchestral score was written by Rolfe Kent and orchestrated by Tony Blondal. Lohan also recorded a song for the soundtrack, titled "Ultimate".

== Reception ==
=== Box office ===
In its opening weekend, the film grossed $22.2 million in 2,954 theaters, finishing second at the box office, behind S.W.A.T. ($37.1 million). The film went on to gross $110.2 million in North America and $50.6 million in other territories for a total of $160.8 million. The film was released in the United Kingdom on December 19, 2003, and opened at number four.

=== Critical response ===
On Rotten Tomatoes, Freaky Friday holds an 88% approval rating based on 160 reviews. The site's consensus reads, "Jamie Lee Curtis and Lindsay Lohan charm in Mark Waters' nicely pitched—and Disney's second—remake of the 1976 hit". On Metacritic, it has a score of 70 out of 100 based on 36 critics, indicating "generally favorable reviews". Audiences polled by CinemaScore gave the film an average grade of "A−" on an A+ to F scale.

Roger Ebert of the Chicago Sun-Times awarded Freaky Friday 3 out of 4 stars, praising the performances and chemistry between Curtis and Lohan. He wrote that "Curtis comes close" to Tom Hanks' performance in Big (1988) in her portrayal of a teenager in an adult body, and called Lohan's performance had "seriousness and intent focus beneath her teenage persona." Lisa Schwarzbaum from Entertainment Weekly described Curtis's performance as "glorious", while A. O. Scott of The New York Times considered it "some of her best work ever."

Variety praised the film, calling it "a fleet and funny comedy" and "genuinely clever switched-identities romp". IGN also praises Curtis' performance, saying "Jamie Lee walks off with most of the laughs and crazy scenes". They also recommend the movie for kids, teenagers and adults.

Slant Magazines Nick Schanger criticized the use of "Oriental mysticism", saying it contradicts the film's message ontolerance and understanding. Ed Park of The Village Voice criticized the Chinese restaurant scene of being "strange racist bullshit," but says the premise is "enduringly appealing as it is absurd".

Common Sense Media gave Freaky Friday 3 out of 5 stars, calling the Mother-daughter switch a "fun comedic chaos". Plugged In, mentions the film "isn’t Oscar material or brilliant filmmaking, but it’s funny, generally clean and pro-family".

In 2023, IndieWire named Freaky Friday the best body swap comedy ever made.

=== Accolades ===
Award	Date of the ceremony	Category	Recipients	Result	Ref.
Critics' Choice Movie Awards	January 10, 2004	Best Family Film	Freaky Friday	Nominated	
Golden Globe Awards	January 25, 2004	Best Actress in a Motion Picture – Musical or Comedy	Jamie Lee Curtis	Nominated	
Satellite Awards	February 21, 2004	Best Actress in a Motion Picture	Jamie Lee Curtis	Nominated	
Golden Schmoes Awards	February 13, 2004	Biggest Surprise of the Year	Freaky Friday	Nominated	
Saturn Awards	May 5, 2004	Best Fantasy Film	Freaky Friday	Nominated	
Saturn Awards	May 5, 2004	Best Actress	Jamie Lee Curtis	Nominated	
Saturn Awards	May 5, 2004	Best Performance by a Younger Actor	Lindsay Lohan	Nominated	
Saturn Awards	May 5, 2004	Best Writing	Heather Hach and Leslie Dixon	Nominated	
Young Artist Awards	May 8, 2004	Best Leading Young Actress in a Feature Film	Lindsay Lohan	Nominated	
Young Artist Awards	May 8, 2004	Best Performance in a Feature Film – Young Actor Age Ten or Younger	Ryan Malgarini	Nominated	
BMI Film & TV Awards	May 12, 2004	BMI Film Music Award	Rolfe Kent	Won	
MTV Movie & TV Awards	June 5, 2004	Best Breakthrough Performance – Female	Lindsay Lohan	Won	
Teen Choice Awards	August 8, 2004	Choice Movie – Comedy	Freaky Friday	Nominated	
Teen Choice Awards	August 8, 2004	Choice Breakout Movie Actress	Lindsay Lohan (also for Confessions of a Teenage Drama Queen and Mean Girls)	Won	
Teen Choice Awards	August 8, 2004	Choice Hissy Fit	Lindsay Lohan	Won	
Phoenix Film Critics Society	December 21, 2004	Best Live Action Family Film	Freaky Friday	Won	

== Home media ==
Freaky Friday was released on DVD and VHS by Walt Disney Home Entertainment on December 16, 2003. By the end of that month, it had sold approximately 4.97 million units, generating over $85.7 million in revenue. The film was later released on Blu-ray on March 27, 2018, as a Disney Movie Club exclusive. It became available for streaming on Disney+ following the platform's launch on November 12, 2019.

== Sequel ==
In October 2022, Curtis expressed enthusiasm about making a Freaky Friday sequel alongside Lohan after disclosing the two were still in touch when a fan asked her if she was open to exploring the film's story further during an event in Mexico. After news of her statement created buzz online, Curtis revealed on The View a few days later that she had already contacted Disney about it and shared a potential pitch. In the following month, Lohan also expressed interest in returning for a sequel if Disney proposed a new film, stating that she loved Curtis and would love to work with the people from the original movie again.

In November 2022, Curtis said they were in talks with the studio and were "both committed to it" but "it's Disney's to make and I think they're interested and we're talking," also commenting that the 2003 film is considered a classic because of its nostalgia among the audience who grew up watching it and she hoped to do it again. In December 2022, Curtis stated that she and Lohan would be getting back together and suggested they were essentially waiting on the studio's green-light.

In February 2023, Curtis reiterated the project "is going to happen." In May 2023, Curtis and Lohan were both interviewed by The New York Times about the original movie turning 20 years and said they "would only make something that people would absolutely adore" when asked about a sequel. Disney then confirmed that the sequel was in development, with Elyse Hollander writing the screenplay, and Curtis and Lohan expected to return.

In June 2023, Curtis revealed to fans at Disneyland that filming was set to happen in the following year.

In August 2023, the cast and crew were interviewed by The Hollywood Reporter as the film celebrated its 20th anniversary, with producer Andrew Gunn teasing the sequel: "Trying to find an idea that also serviced Jamie and Lindsay but also worked in all these other characters, was one of the hardest things to do, but I'm telling you [the writer] just came up with this super funny, heartwarming idea," continuing, "I didn't know what a sequel would be 20 years ago, like it would be Harry switching with grandpa or something, but all of a sudden, 20 years later, it's like, 'Oh, actually, [a sequel] could work.' So, I think, time gives it more room to actually become something." Gunn later revealed they got a draft of a script for the sequel right before the writers' strike, which again incorporates music and the fictional band Pink Slip "in a great way." On November 10, Curtis shared a reunion photo with Lohan on Instagram to celebrate the end of the SAG-AFTRA strike and tease the project's development.

In March 2024, Lohan confirmed the sequel was in the works. Later that month, The Hollywood Reporter announced Nisha Ganatra would be directing from a screenplay written by Jordan Weiss, with filming set to begin for mid-2024 in Los Angeles and is scheduled to be released in 2025. Gunn was confirmed to produce again, along with Kristin Burr. A few days later, a casting call revealed potential story details including that Tess and Anna would be body swapping with two teenage girls, the latter's daughter and her soon-to-be stepdaughter.

In June 2024, it was reported Julia Butters had joined the cast. During that month, it was announced that filming had begun and that Harmon, Murray, Vidal Mitchell, Hudson, Soong, Tobolowsky, and Chao would all be reprising their roles with Sophia Hammons and Maitreyi Ramakrishnan joining the cast. The sequel, titled Freakier Friday, is scheduled to be released on August 8, 2025.

== See also ==
- 2003 in film
- 2004 Teen Choice Awards – American awards ceremony held in California
- Lindsay Lohan discography
