= Julia Butters =

American actress (born 2009)

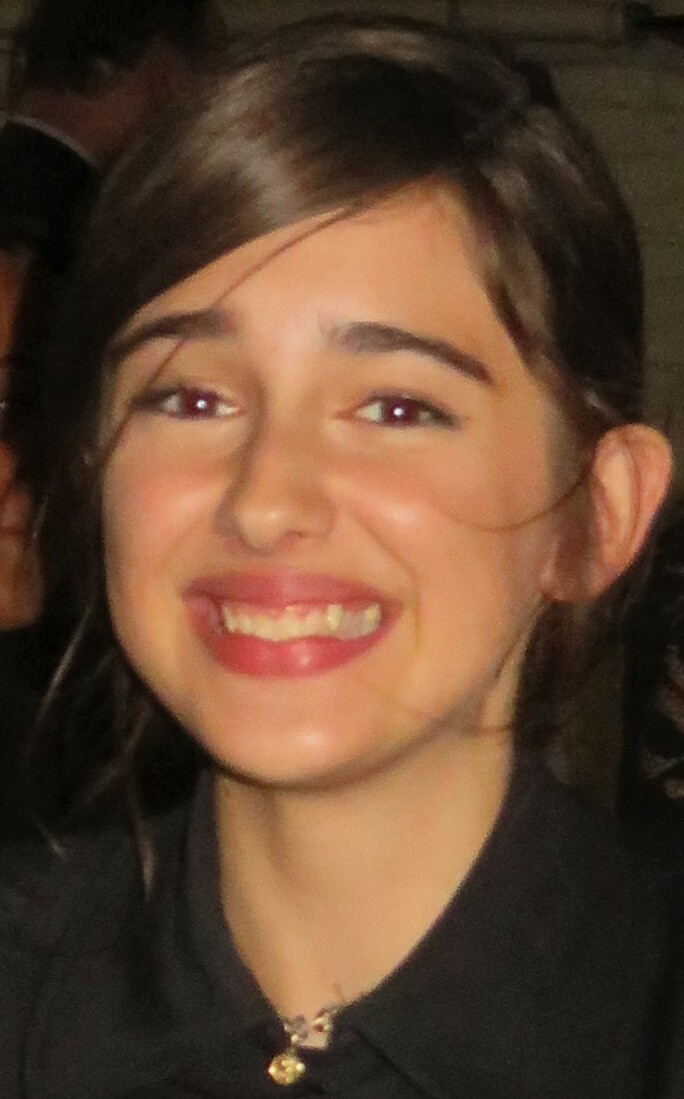
- Butters in 2022
- Born: April 15, 2009 (age 17); Los Angeles, California, U.S.
- Occupation: Actress
- Years active: 2011–present
- Known for: Once Upon a Time in Hollywood; The Fabelmans; American Housewife; Freakier Friday

Julia Butters (born April 15, 2009) is an American actress. She began her career at the age of five, and starred as Trudi Fraser in the film Once Upon a Time in Hollywood (2019), for which she was nominated for the Critics' Choice Movie Award for Best Young Actor/Actress, and as Reggie Fabelman in The Fabelmans (2022). She rose to prominence for playing Anna-Kat Otto in American Housewife (2016–2020), and for playing Harper Coleman in Freakier Friday (2025).

== Early life ==
Butters was born on April 15, 2009, in Los Angeles. Her father Darrin Butters is a Disney animator who has worked on films such as Frozen and Ralph Breaks the Internet.

== Career ==
Julia Butters began her career doing commercials. Her first speaking role was the role of Gabby in Criminal Minds. In 2016, Butters portrayed the recurring role of Ella in the Amazon Prime Video series Transparent. Later that year, she began starring in the ABC sitcom American Housewife as Anna-Kat Otto. While Quentin Tarantino was writing the script of his ninth film Once Upon a Time in Hollywood, he spotted Butters on television, and later cast her in the role of precocious child actress Trudi Fraser. After she received critical acclaim for this role, Butters decided to pursue similar opportunities, leading her to leave American Housewife after four seasons. In December 2020, Butters was cast in Netflix's The Gray Man.

In June 2021, it was announced that Butters was cast in The Fabelmans, Steven Spielberg's semi-autobiographical coming-of-age film as Reggie Fabelman, a character based on Spielberg's sister Anne. In August 2022, Butters was cast as Lily in the film Queen of Bones. In 2024, she was cast in Freakier Friday (2025), the sequel to the 2003 film Freaky Friday. She played Harper Coleman, the daughter of Anna Coleman (Lindsay Lohan) and granddaughter of Tess Coleman (Jamie Lee Curtis).

== Filmography ==
=== Film ===
Year	Title	Role	Notes
2016	13 Hours: The Secret Soldiers of Benghazi	Beverly Silva	
2016	Term Life	young Cate Barrow	
2016	A Family Man	Lauren Jensen	
2019	Once Upon a Time in Hollywood	Trudi Fraser	
2022	The Gray Man	Claire Fitzroy	
2022	The Fabelmans	Regina "Reggie" Fabelman	
2023	Queen of Bones	Lily	
2025	Freakier Friday	Harper Coleman / Anna Coleman	
2026	Wish I Were a Phoenix	TBA	

=== Television ===
Year	Title	Role	Notes
2014	Criminal Minds	Gabby Hoffer	Season 9, episode 16
2015–2016	Best Friends Whenever	5-year-old Cyd	2 episodes
2015	The Kicks	Ashley McBride	Season 1, episode 5
2015–2016	Transparent	Ella	8 episodes
2016–2020	American Housewife	Anna-Kat Otto	Seasons 1–4; Main role
2020	Short Circuit	Little Girl	Voice; Season 1, episode 14
2021	I Think You Should Leave with Tim Robinson	Tammy Craps Doll Spokesperson	Season 2, episode 6
2021	Adventure Time: Distant Lands	Larry / Additional Voices	Voice; Season 1 episode 4
2024	Monsters at Work	Lorelei Worthington	Voice; 3 episodes
2025	The Paper	High School Student	Season 1, episode 4

== Discography ==
Year	Song	Album	Ref.
2025	"Baby" (with Lindsay Lohan)	Freakier Friday (Original Motion Picture Soundtrack)	

== Awards and nominations ==
Year	Award	Category	Work	Result	Ref
2019	Chicago Film Critics Association	Most Promising Performer	Once Upon a Time in Hollywood	Nominated	
2019	Las Vegas Film Critics Society	Youth in Film – Female	Once Upon a Time in Hollywood	Won	
2019	San Diego Film Critics Society	Breakthrough Artist	Once Upon a Time in Hollywood	Nominated	
2019	Seattle Film Critics Society	Best Youth Performance	Once Upon a Time in Hollywood	Nominated	
2019	Washington D.C. Area Film Critics Association	Best Youth Performance	Once Upon a Time in Hollywood	Nominated	
2020	Critics' Choice Movie Awards	Best Young Actor/Actress	Once Upon a Time in Hollywood	Nominated	
2020	Hollywood Film Critics Association	Best Actress 23 and Under	Once Upon a Time in Hollywood	Nominated	
2020	Music City Film Critics Association	Best Young Actress	Once Upon a Time in Hollywood	Nominated	
2020	Online Film and Television Association	Best Youth Performance	Once Upon a Time in Hollywood	Nominated	
2023	Palm Springs International Film Festival	Vanguard Award	The Fabelmans	Won	
2023	Music City Film Critics Association	Best Young Actress	The Fabelmans	Nominated	
