= Andrew Gunn (film producer) =

Canadian film producer (1967–2026)

- Born: July 15, 1967; Toronto, Ontario, Canada
- Died: March 2, 2026 (aged 58); Toronto, Ontario, Canada
- Occupation: Film producer
- Notable work: Freaky Friday (2003–2025)
- Spouses: Jane Bellamy-Gunn (m. 2025)

Andrew Gunn (July 15, 1967 – March 2, 2026) was a Canadian film producer. His wife is, Jane Bellamy-Gunn. Andrew Gunn worked with John Hughes' Great Oaks Entertainment 1997-2000, to help develop 101 Dalmatians (1996), Flubber (1997), Home Alone 3 (1997) and 102 Dalmatian's (2000). His production company, Gunn Films, was started in 2001. He worked with Walt Disney Pictures from 2001 to 2015 to produce films such as Freaky Friday (2003), Country Bears (2002), The Haunted Mansion (2003), Sky High (2005), College Road Trip (2008), Bedtime Stories (2008), Race to Witch Mountain (2009), Bad Santa 2 (2016), Unhinged (2020), Cruella (2021), and Freakier Friday (2025). Co-Produced: Eddie (1996), Executive Prod: Minutemen (2008). Andrew Gunn's film's have grossed over $2 billion.

== Life and career ==
Andrew Gunn and wife Jane Bellamy Gunn

Andrew Gunn was born in Toronto, Ontario, Canada on July 15, 1967. He was married to his childhood love from Toronto, Jane Bellamy-Gunn. The couple first met in High School at Lawrence Park Collegiate Institute, later dating while working together at Roots, ultimately reuniting later in life to marry. Andrew Gunn has 2 children from a prior partnership, Isabelle and Connor. Early in his career, Gunn served as Senior Vice President of Production and Development for John Hughes' company, Great Oaks Entertainment, from 1997 to 2000. This successful executive work paved the way for him to launch Gunn Films in 2001. He worked with Walt Disney 2001 - 2015 and his films grossed over $2 billion. He was one of the founders of Solstice Studios, based in Los Angeles. Gunn died from complications of amyotrophic lateral sclerosis at his home in Toronto, on March 2, 2026, at the age of 58. Gunn leaves behind his wife Jane Bellamy-Gunn and his 2 children.

== Filmography ==
Gunn was a producer in all films unless otherwise noted.

=== Film ===
Year	Film	Credit
1996	Eddie	Co-producer
2002	The Country Bears	
2003	Freaky Friday	
2003	The Haunted Mansion	
2005	Sky High	
2008	College Road Trip	
2008	Bedtime Stories	
2009	Race to Witch Mountain	
2016	Bad Santa 2	
2020	Unhinged	
2021	Cruella	
2025	Freakier Friday	

As an actor

Year	Film	Role
1987	The Gate	Brad
2018	Collusions	Police Officer #1

=== Television ===
Year	Title	Credit	Notes
2008	Minutemen	Executive producer	Television film

As an actor

Year	Title	Role	Notes
1983	Juliet Bravo	Walter Cadwell	
1985	My Father, My Rival	Kelly	Television film
1988	War of the Worlds	College Boy #2	

As writer

Year	Title
2003	Freaky
