= Bridget Carpenter =

American screenwriter

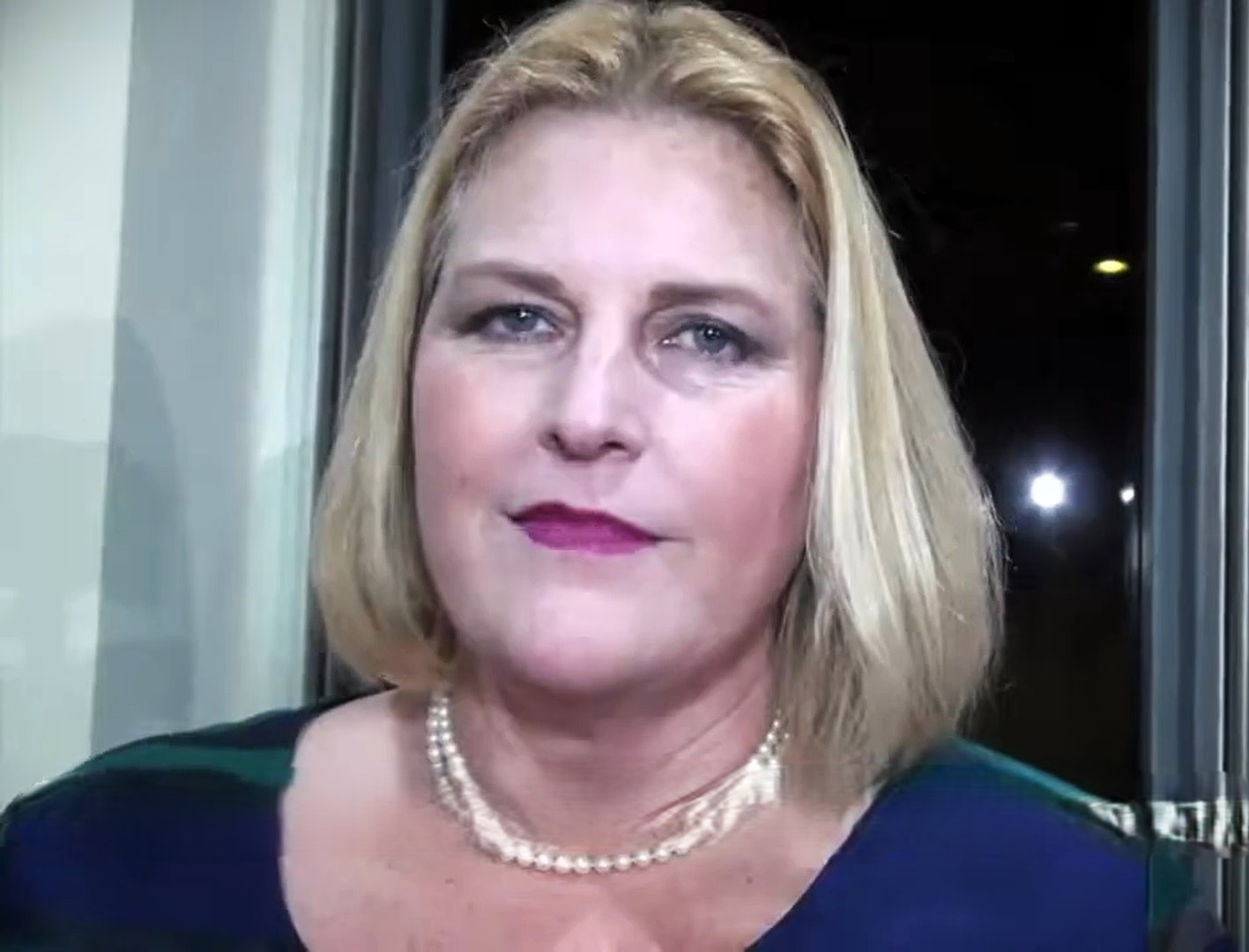
- Born: 1975 (age 50–51); New York City, New York, U.S.
- Education: Brown University (MFA, 1995)
- Occupations: Screenwriter; playwright; television producer
- Notable work: Friday Night Lights; Parenthood; 11.22.63; The Red Road; Freaky Friday
- Awards: Susan Smith Blackburn Prize (2000); Guggenheim Fellowship (2002); Kesselring Prize (2003); Princess Grace Award (1997, 2017)

Bridget Carpenter (born in New York City) is a television writer and playwright.

== Biography ==
She received an M.F.A. from Brown University in 1995. Her plays have been produced at venues including Arena Stage, Washington, D.C., the Los Angeles Theatre Center, and La Mama ETC, New York.

She lives in Los Angeles.

She has written the book for a musical version of the book (and films) Freaky Friday. The musical premiered in October 2016 at the Signature Theatre, followed by a run from January to March 2017 at the La Jolla Playhouse under the direction of Christopher Ashley.

== Awards ==
She was nominated for a Writers Guild of America Award for Best New Series at the February 2007 ceremony, for her work on the first season of Friday Night Lights. She was nominated for the WGA Award for Best Dramatic Series the following year at the February 2008 ceremony, for her work on the second season of Friday Night Lights. Carpenter was nominated for Best Dramatic Series a second time at the February 2009 ceremony for her work on the third season of Friday Night Lights. She was nominated for the WGA Award for Best Drama Series for the third consecutive year at the February 2010 ceremony for her work on the fourth season.

She won the 2000 Susan Smith Blackburn Prize for Fall, was awarded a 2002 Guggenheim Fellowship, and was awarded the 2003 Kesselring Prize for The Faculty Room. In 1997, she received a Princess Grace Award for Playwriting and the Princess Grace Statue Award in 2017. Which is the same year she wrote “Freaky Friday: A New Musical.”

== Work ==
Producer:

- Westworld (2016) TV series (consulting producer) (3 episodes, 2016)
- 11.22.63 (2016) TV miniseries (executive producer) (8 episodes, 2015–2016)
- The Red Road (2014) TV series (executive producer) (6 episodes, 2014)
- Parenthood (2010) TV series (co-executive producer) (7 episodes, 2011–2012)
- Friday Night Lights (2006) TV series (producer) (21 episodes, 2006–2007), (co-executive producer) (22 episodes, 2009–2011), (supervising producer) (6 episode, 2007–2008), ...AKA "F.N.L." - USA (promotional abbreviation)
- Dead Like Me (2003) TV series (co-producer) (15 episodes, 2004)

Writer:

She has worked on the NBC drama series Friday Night Lights and Parenthood. She wrote for the Sundance TV series The Red Road and the Hulu miniseries 11.22.63, which stars James Franco.

- 11.22.63 (2016) TV miniseries (4 episodes, 2016)
- The Red Road (2014) TV series (1 episode, 2014)
- Parenthood (2010) TV series (9 episodes, 2010–2013)
- Friday Night Lights (2006) TV series (10 episodes, 2006–2011) ... aka "F.N.L." - USA (promotional abbreviation)
- Bionic Woman (2007) TV series (1 episode, 2007) ... aka "The Bionic Woman" - USA (complete title)
- Head Cases (2005) TV series (1 episode, 2005)
- Tsunami Aid: A Concert of Hope (2005) TV special
- Dead Like Me (2003) TV series (5 episodes, 2003–2004)

=== Plays ===
- Euxious (2003)
- Hurry! (2003)
- Up (The Man in the Flying Chair) (2002).
- The Faculty Room (2002)
- Fall (2000)
- The Death of the Father of Psychpanalysis (and Anna), (1997)
- Mr. Xmas (1997)
- Tiny (1997)
- West (1997)
- The Ugly Duckling (1996)
- OED (1995)
- Variations on a Sex Change (1994)
- Roman Fever (1996)
- The Ride (1994)
