= Freaky Friday (1995 film) =

1995 television film by Melanie Mayron

- Promotional poster
- Genre: Fantasy comedy
- Based on: Freaky Friday by Mary Rodgers; Freaky Friday by Mary Rodgers
- Teleplay by: Stu Krieger
- Directed by: Melanie Mayron
- Starring: Shelley Long; Gaby Hoffmann
- Music by: James McVay; Lisa Harlow Stark
- Country of origin: United States
- Original language: English

Production
- Executive producers: George Zaloom; Les Mayfield; Scott Immergut
- Producer: Joan Van Horn
- Cinematography: Russ Alsobrook
- Editor: Henk Van Eeghen
- Running time: 86 minutes
- Production companies: Zaloom/Mayfield Productions; Walt Disney Television

Original release
- Network: ABC
- Release: May 6, 1995

Related
- Escape to Witch Mountain

Freaky Friday is a 1995 American fantasy comedy television film directed by Melanie Mayron and written by Stu Krieger. It is based on Mary Rodgers's 1972 novel of the same name and her screenplay for its 1976 film adaptation, and is the second installment overall in the Freaky Friday franchise. It stars Shelley Long and Gaby Hoffmann as a mother and daughter who magically switch bodies for a day. Produced by Walt Disney Television, the film premiered on ABC on May 6, 1995 as an episode of The Wonderful World of Disney. It was the last in a series of four remakes of live-action Disney films produced for broadcast on ABC during the 1994–95 television season, the other three being The Shaggy Dog, The Computer Wore Tennis Shoes, and Escape to Witch Mountain.

== Plot ==
A mother, Ellen, and daughter, Annabelle, find it difficult to get along with each other because of their different views on their own lives and each other's. A pair of magical amulets causes the two of them to switch bodies for a day. Ellen's boyfriend, Bill, drives them both to work where she has to present a new clothing line. She, initially worried about the fact that she has no idea of what to do, goes along with it anyway. Meanwhile, Annabelle has an awkward day at school with her friends and she learns what her daughter's life is really like. Back at her job, Ellen and Bill eventually have an argument (with Annabelle saying how she feels about Bill in her mother's body). He later apologizes to "Ellen" and proposes to her, much to her horror. "Annabelle" then calls and finally is able to convince Bill that they have truly switched bodies. He then realizes why "Ellen" turned him down. A bit later, they rush down to the diving event the school is holding because "Annabelle" cannot swim. After they save her, they switch back to their original bodies and Annabelle and Ellen finally have a new understanding of what the other has to go through.

Among many changes from the original, this version of the story has diving instead of waterskiing as Annabelle's main hobby, which again plays a big role in the film's climax. Also, in the original film (and the book), Ellen and Bill are married and Bill is Annabelle's father, whereas in this adaptation, Ellen is a single mom and Bill is her new sweetheart. It also reveals how they switched bodies.

== Cast ==
- Shelley Long as Ellen Andrews/Annabelle Andrews in Ellen's body
- Gaby Hoffmann as Annabelle Andrews/Ellen Andrews in Annabelle's body
- Catlin Adams as Dana "Dinky" Barb
- Sandra Bernhard as Frieda Debny
- Eileen Brennan as Principal Handel
- Drew Carey as Stan Horner
- Carol Kane as Leanne Futterman
- Kevin Krakower as Herbie
- Taylor Negron as Cary
- Alan Rosenberg as Bill

In addition to the principal characters, the film has supporting cast appearances by Reagan Gomez-Preston ("Heather"), Jackie Hoffman, Andrew Keegan and Marla Sokoloff.
