= Walt Disney Pictures =

American film production company

- Logo used since 2012

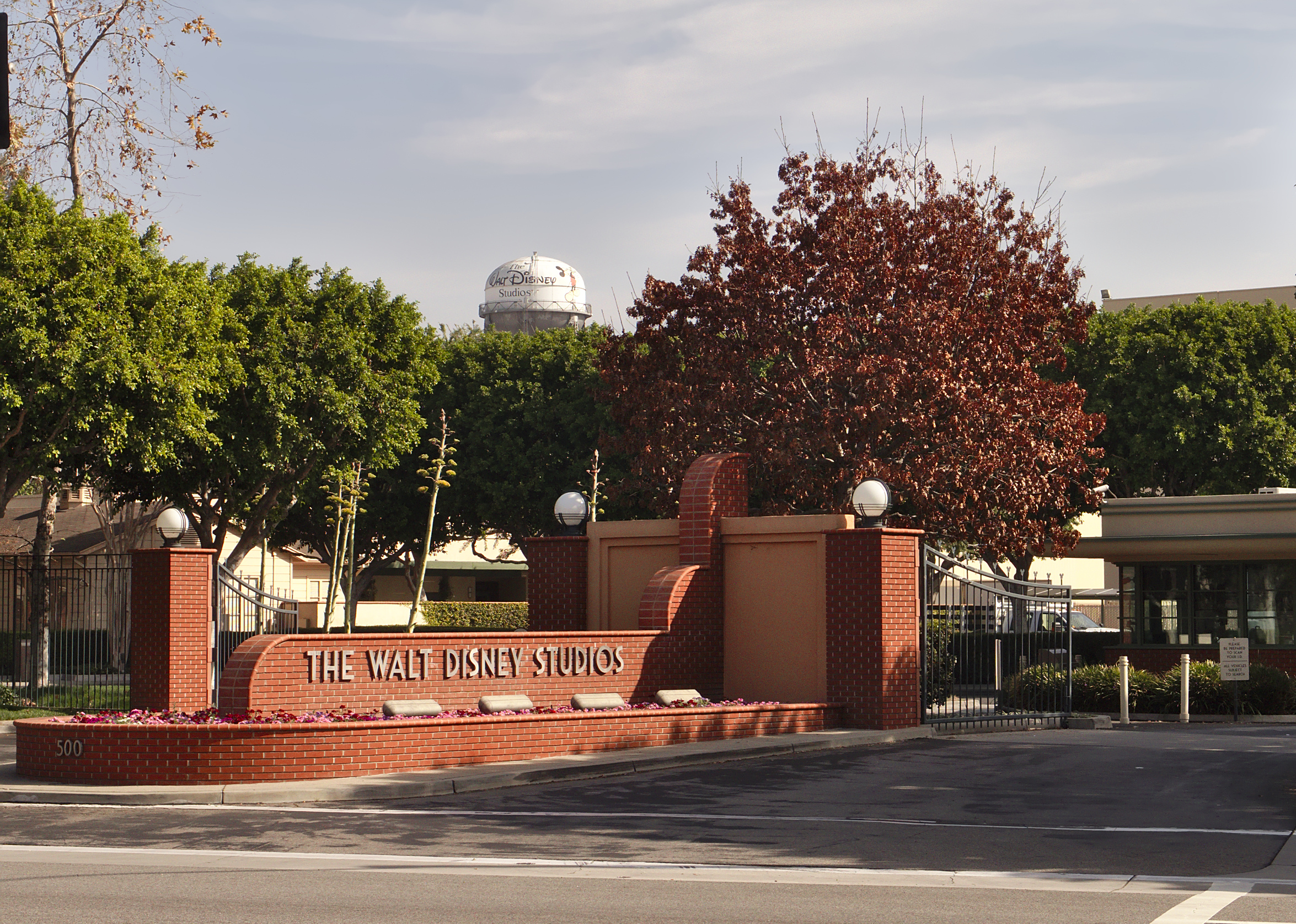
- The Walt Disney Studios' Riverside Drive property in Burbank, California
- Formerly: Disney Brothers Cartoon Studio (1923–1926); Walt Disney Studio (1926–1929); Walt Disney Productions (1929–1983)
- Type: Division
- Industry: Film
- Founded: October 16, 1923; 103 years ago
- Founder: Walt Disney; Roy O. Disney
- Headquarters: 500 South Buena Vista Street, Burbank, California, U.S.
- Area served: Worldwide
- Key people: David Greenbaum (president, Walt Disney Pictures and 20th Century Studios)
- Products: Motion pictures
- Parent: Walt Disney Studios
- Divisions: Disneynature
- Website: movies.disney.com

Walt Disney Pictures (Note: Walt Disney Pictures is the proper legal name, although the studio is often billed simply as "Disney" and also referred to as "Disney Live-Action".) is an American film production company that is a division of the Walt Disney Studios, a division of Disney Entertainment, which is owned by the Walt Disney Company. Founded on October 16, 1923, the studio is the flagship producer of live-action feature films within the Walt Disney Studios unit and is based at the Walt Disney Studios in Burbank, California. Animated films produced by Walt Disney Animation Studios and Pixar Animation Studios are also released under the studio banner. Walt Disney Studios Motion Pictures distributes and markets the films produced by Walt Disney Pictures.

Disney began producing live-action films in the 1950s. The live-action division became Walt Disney Pictures in 1983, when Disney reorganized its entire studio division, which included the separation from the feature animation division and the subsequent creation of Touchstone Pictures. At the end of that decade, combined with Touchstone's output, Walt Disney Pictures elevated Disney to one of Hollywood's major film studios.

Walt Disney Pictures is currently one of five live-action film studios within the Walt Disney Studios, alongside Marvel Studios, Lucasfilm, 20th Century Studios and Searchlight Pictures. Zootopia 2 is the studio's highest-grossing release overall with $1.8 billion, and Pirates of the Caribbean is the studio's most commercially successful film franchise, with five films earning a total of over $4.5 billion in worldwide box office gross.

== History ==
=== Predecessor unit ===
The studio's predecessor (and the modern-day the Walt Disney Company's as a whole) was founded as the Disney Brothers Cartoon Studio, by filmmaker Walt Disney and his business partner and brother, Roy, in 1923.

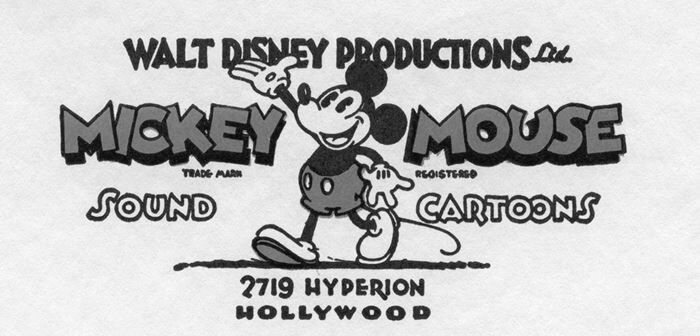
Logo used from 1929 to 1937

The creation of Mickey Mouse and subsequent short films and merchandise generated revenue for the studio, which was renamed as The Walt Disney Studio at the Hyperion Studio in 1926. In 1929, it was renamed again to Walt Disney Productions. The studio's streak of success continued in the 1930s, culminating with the 1937 release of the first feature-length animated film, Snow White and the Seven Dwarfs, which becomes a huge financial success. With the profits from Snow White, Walt relocated to a third studio in Burbank, California.

In the 1940s, Disney began experimenting with full-length live-action films, with the introduction of hybrid live action-animated films such as The Reluctant Dragon (1941) and Song of the South (1946). That same decade, the studio began producing nature documentaries with the release of Seal Island (1948), the first of the True-Life Adventures series and a subsequent Academy Award winner for Best Live-Action Short Film.

Walt Disney Productions had its first fully live-action film in 1950 with the release of Treasure Island, considered by Disney to be the official conception for what would eventually evolve into the modern-day Walt Disney Pictures. By 1953, the company ended their agreements with such third-party distributors as RKO Radio Pictures and United Artists and formed their own distribution company, Buena Vista Distribution. By the 1950s, the company had purchased the rights to the work of L. Frank Baum.

=== 1980s–2000s ===
The wordmark for Walt Disney Pictures used in marketing their films from 1986 to 1998. It was also used for Pixar films from 1995 to 2007.

The live-action division of Walt Disney Productions was incorporated as Walt Disney Pictures on April 1, 1983, to diversify film subjects and expand audiences for their film releases. In April 1983, Richard Berger was hired by Disney CEO Ron W. Miller as film president. Touchstone Films was started by Miller in February 1984 as a label for the studio's PG-13 and R-rated films with an expected half of Disney's yearly 6-to-8-movie slate, which would be released under the label. That same year, newly named Disney CEO Michael Eisner replaced Berger with his former film chief from Paramount Pictures, Jeffrey Katzenberg, and Frank Wells from Warner Bros. Pictures. Touchstone and Hollywood Pictures were formed within that unit on February 15, 1984, and February 1, 1989, respectively.

The Touchstone Films banner was used by then-new Disney CEO Michael Eisner in the 1984–1985 television season with the short-lived western, Wildside. In the next season, Touchstone produced a hit in The Golden Girls.

David Hoberman was promoted to president of production at Walt Disney Pictures in April 1988. In April 1994, Hoberman was promoted to president of motion picture production at Walt Disney Studios, and David Vogel was appointed as Walt Disney Pictures president. The following year, however, Hoberman resigned from the company and instead began a production deal with Disney and his newly formed production company, Mandeville Films. In addition to Walt Disney Pictures, Vogel added the head position of Hollywood Pictures in 1997, while Donald De Line remained as head of Touchstone. Vogel was then promoted in 1998 to the head of Buena Vista Motion Pictures Group, the newly formed division that oversaw all live-action production within the Walt Disney Pictures, Touchstone, and Hollywood labels. The move was orchestrated by Walt Disney Studios chairman Joe Roth, as an effort to scale back and consolidate the studio's film production. As a result of the restructuring, De Line resigned.

The wordmark for Walt Disney Pictures used in marketing their films from 1998 to 2007

That same year, Nina Jacobson became executive vice-president of live-action production for Buena Vista Motion Pictures Group. Jacobson remained under this title until May 1999, when Vogel resigned from the company, and Jacobson was appointed by Roth to the role of president of production. During her tenure, Jacobson oversaw the production of films at Walt Disney Pictures, including Pirates of the Caribbean,The Chronicles of Narnia, Bridge to Terabithia, National Treasure, Remember the Titans, and The Princess Diaries, and was responsible for establishing a first-look deal with Jerry Bruckheimer Films. Jacobson was also behind the studio's remakes of The Parent Trap and Freaky Friday. In 2006, Jacobson was fired by studio chairman Dick Cook, and replaced by Oren Aviv, the head of marketing. In July 2007, Disney CEO Bob Iger banned the depiction of smoking and tobacco products from Walt Disney Pictures films.

Logo used from 2005 to 2011

After two films based on Disney theme park attractions, Walt Disney Pictures selected it as a source of a line of films starting with The Country Bears (2002) and The Haunted Mansion and Pirates of the Caribbean: The Curse of the Black Pearl (both 2003). The latter film—the first film produced by the studio to receive a PG-13 rating—began a film series that was followed by four sequels, with the franchise taking in more than $5.4 billion worldwide from 2003 to 2017. On January 12, 2010, Aviv stepped down as the studio's president of live-action production.

=== 2010s–present ===
In January 2010, Sean Bailey was appointed the studio's president of live-action production, replacing Aviv. Bailey had produced Tron: Legacy for the studio, which was released later that same year. Under Bailey's leadership and with support from then Disney CEO Bob Iger—and later studio chairman Alan Horn—Walt Disney Pictures pursued a tent-pole film strategy, which included an expanded slate of original and adaptive large-budget tentpole films. Beginning in 2011, the studio simplified the branding in its production logo and marquee credits to just "Disney". Concurrently, Disney was struggling with PG-13 tentpole films outside of the Pirates of the Caribbean series, with films such as John Carter (2012) and The Lone Ranger (2013) becoming some of the biggest box-office bombs of all time. However, the studio had found particular success with live-action fantasy adaptations of properties associated with their animated films, which began with the commercial success of Alice in Wonderland (2010), that became the second billion-dollar-grossing film in the studio's history. With the continued success of Maleficent (2014) and Cinderella (2015), the studio saw the potential in these fantasy adaptations and officiated a trend of similar films, which followed with The Jungle Book (2016) and Beauty and the Beast (2017). In March 2015, Iger expanded the studio's smoking and tobacco prohibition to include all films released by the studio—including PG-13 rated films and below—unless such depictions are historically pertinent.

Despite the acclaim and commercial success of several smaller-budgeted genre films throughout the 2010s, such as The Muppets (2011), Saving Mr. Banks (2013), and Into the Woods (2014), Walt Disney Pictures shifted its production model entirely on tent-pole films as they had found that a majority of the smaller genre films were becoming financially unsustainable in the theatrical market. By July 2016, Disney had announced development of nearly eighteen films consisting of sequels to existing adaptations, origin stories and prequels.

In 2017, the Walt Disney Company announced it was creating its own streaming service platform. The new service, known as Disney+, would feature original programming created by the company's vast array of film and television production studios, including Walt Disney Pictures. As part of this new distribution platform, Bailey and Horn confirmed that Walt Disney Pictures would renew development on smaller-budgeted genre films that the studio had previously stopped producing for the theatrical exhibition market a few years prior. In 2018, nine films were announced to be in production or development for the service. These films would be budgeted between $20 million and $60 million. The studio was expected to produce approximately 3–4 films per year exclusively for Disney+, alongside its theatrical tentpole slate. Disney+ was launched on November 12, 2019, in the United States, Canada, and the Netherlands, with subsequent international expansions. Within the first two months of the service's launch, Walt Disney Pictures had released three films (Lady and the Tramp, Noelle, and Togo) exclusively for Disney+.

On March 12, 2020, 20th Century Family president Vanessa Morrison was named president of live-action development and production of streaming content for both Disney and 20th Century Studios, reporting directly to Bailey. That same day, Philip Steuer and Randi Hiller were also appointed as president of the studio's physical, post-production and VFX, and executive vice president for casting, respectively–overseeing these functions for both Walt Disney Pictures and 20th Century Studios. In 2023, Walt Disney Pictures celebrated its centennial alongside Walt Disney Animation Studios and their corporate parent company as a whole. That same year, Indiana Jones and the Dial of Destiny marked the studio's first official co-production with Lucasfilm.

On February 26, 2024, Disney announced a leadership change, with Bailey stepping down as president and replaced by David Greenbaum, who formerly co-led Searchlight Pictures. Greenbaum leads Walt Disney Pictures and co-leads 20th Century Studios with current 20th Century president Steve Asbell. On February 19, 2025, Daria Cercek joined the studio as president of theatrical production.

== Logo ==
The current on-screen logo of Walt Disney Pictures, introduced in 2022 for the studio's 100th anniversary in 2023. The standard version, pictured here, debuted in 2024 on the official trailer for Inside Out 2.

Until 1983, instead of a traditional production logo, the opening credits of Disney films used to feature a title card that read "Walt Disney Presents", and later, "Walt Disney Productions Presents".

Beginning with the release of Return to Oz in 1985, Walt Disney Pictures introduced its fantasy castle logo. The version with its accompanying music premiered with The Black Cauldron. The logo was created by Walt Disney Productions in traditional animation and featured a white silhouette of Disneyland's Sleeping Beauty Castle against a blue background, with the studio's name in Walt Disney's signature style and underscored by "When You Wish Upon a Star", in arrangement composed by John Debney. A short rendition of the logo was used as a closing logo as well as in the movie Return to Oz, although the film was released months before The Black Cauldron was released. An animated RenderMan variant appeared before every Pixar Animation Studios film from Toy Story until Ratatouille, featuring an original fanfare composed by Randy Newman, based on the opening score cue from Toy Story, called "Andy's Birthday". Beginning with Dinosaur (2000), an alternative logo featuring an orange castle and logo against a black background, was occasionally presented with darker tone and live-action films, though a few animated films such as Brother Bear, the 2002 re-release of The Lion King and The Wild (the final film to use this logo) used this logo.

In 2006, the studio's vanity card logo was updated with the release of Pirates of the Caribbean: Dead Man's Chest at the behest of then-Walt Disney Studios chairman Dick Cook and studio marketing president Oren Aviv. Designed by Disney animation director Mike Gabriel and producer Baker Bloodworth, the modernized logo was created completely in computer animation by Wētā FX and yU+co and featured a 3D Walt Disney logo. The final rendering of the logo was done by Cameron Smith and Cyrese Parrish. In addition, the revamped logo includes visual references to Pinocchio, Dumbo, Cinderella, Peter Pan and Mary Poppins, and its redesigned castle incorporates elements from both the Cinderella Castle and the Sleeping Beauty Castle, as well as fireworks and Walt Disney's family crest on the flag. Mark Mancina wrote a new composition and arrangement of "When You Wish Upon a Star" to accompany the 2006 logo. It was co-arranged and orchestrated by David Metzger. In 2011, starting with The Muppets, the sequence was modified to truncate the "Walt Disney Pictures" branding to have it read simply as "Disney". The new logo sequence has been consistently modified for high-profile releases including Tron: Legacy, Pirates of the Caribbean: On Stranger Tides, Oz the Great and Powerful, Maleficent, Tomorrowland, The Jungle Book, and Beauty and the Beast.

In 2022, a new vanity card logo was introduced for the studio's 100th anniversary in 2023, which premiered at the 2022 D23 Expo. The new castle logo features an updated opening sequence in computer animation created by Industrial Light & Magic and an arrangement of "When You Wish Upon a Star" composed by Christophe Beck, conducted by Tim Davies and mixed by Greg Hayes. The arc that forms from right to left above the castle now flies from left to right. A byline appeared below the Disney100 logo during the studio's 100th anniversary in 2023, reading "100 Years of Wonder", which was later removed starting with Chang Can Dunk but returned with the international prints of Indiana Jones and the Dial of Destiny in theaters. While containing the same visual references as the previous logo, new references added to it include Pocahontas, Up, Hercules, The Hunchback of Notre Dame, Snow White and the Seven Dwarfs, The Little Mermaid, Tangled, Brave and Beauty and the Beast, with the addition of Disneyland's Matterhorn from Third Man on the Mountain and Pride Rock from The Lion King in the background beyond the castle. Its first film appearance was with the release of Strange World. The logo received widespread praise from critics and audiences and won Gold in the "Theatrical | Film: Design" medium at the 2023 Clio Entertainment Awards in November 2023. The standard version of the logo premiered theatrically with The Beach Boys.

== Film library ==
The studio's first live-action film was Treasure Island (1950). Animated films produced by Walt Disney Animation Studios and Pixar Animation Studios are also released by Walt Disney Pictures. The studio has released four films that have received an Academy Award for Best Picture nomination: Mary Poppins (1964), Beauty and the Beast (1991), Up (2009), and Toy Story 3 (2010).

=== Film series and franchises ===
Title	Release date	Notes
Davy Crockett	1955–1956	Originally edited from TV mini series episodes which originally aired on Disneyland
Old Yeller	1957–1963	
The Shaggy Dog	1959–2006	Co-production with Mandeville Films, Tollin/Robbins Productions, Boxing Cat Films, Robert Simonds Productions, and Shaggy Dog Productions
The Absent-Minded Professor	1961–1997	Co-production with Great Oaks Entertainment
The Parent Trap	1961–1998	
The Incredible Journey	1963–1996	
Mary Poppins	1964–2018	Co-production with Lucamar Productions and Marc Platt Productions
Herbie	1969–2005	Co-production with Robert Simonds Productions
Dexter Riley	1969–1975	
Witch Mountain	1975–2009	Co-production with Gunn Films
The Apple Dumpling Gang	1975–1979	
Freaky Friday	1976–present	Co-production with Gunn Films
Tron	1982–present	Co-production with Lisberger/Kushner Productions and Sean Bailey Productions
Who Framed Roger Rabbit	1988–1993	Co-production with Silver Screen Partners and Amblin Entertainment
Honey, I Shrunk the Kids	1989–present	Co-production with Silver Screen Partners and Touchwood Pacific Partners
Turner & Hooch	1989–2021	Co-production with Silver Screen Partners
White Fang	1991–1994	Co-production with Silver Screen Partners and Hybrid Productions, Inc.
The Mighty Ducks	1992–2022	Co-production with Avnet-Kerner Productions and Touchwood Pacific Partners
Sister Act	1992–present	Co-production with Touchwood Pacific Partners
The Muppets	1992–present	Co-production with Jim Henson Productions (1992–1996), Mandeville Films, and The Muppets Studio
Hocus Pocus	1993–present	Co-production with David Kirschner Productions
The Santa Clause	1994–2006	Co-production with Hollywood Pictures, Outlaw Productions, and Boxing Cat films (sequels)
George of the Jungle	1997–2003	Co-production with Avnet-Kerner Productions, Mandeville Films, and The Kerner Entertainment Company
Inspector Gadget	1999–present	Co-production with Caravan Pictures, DIC Entertainment, Avnet-Kerner Productions, Roger Birnbaum Productions, and The Kerner Entertainment Company
The Princess Diaries	2001–present	Co-production with BrownHouse Productions, Shondaland, and Martin Chase Productions
Pirates of the Caribbean	2003–present	Co-production with Jerry Bruckheimer Films
Haunted Mansion	2003–2023	Co-production with Rideback
National Treasure	2004–present	Co-production with Jerry Bruckheimer Films, Junction Entertainment and Saturn Films
The Chronicles of Narnia	2005–2008	Co-production with Walden Media; third film produced by 20th Century Studios
Enchanted	2007–2022	Co-production with Right Coast Productions, Josephson Entertainment and Andalasia Productions
Beverly Hills Chihuahua	2008–2012	Co-production with Mandeville Films
The Last Warrior	2017–2021	Co-production with Yellow, Black & White
Stargirl	2020–2022	Co-production with Gotham Group and Hahnscape Entertainment
Diary of a Wimpy Kid	2021–present	Co-production with 20th Century Animation and Bardel Entertainment; original live-action films produced by 20th Century Studios
Indiana Jones	2023	Co-production with Lucasfilm; first four films produced by Paramount Pictures

=== Highest-grossing films ===
Walt Disney Pictures has produced six live-action films that have grossed over $1 billion at the worldwide box office: Pirates of the Caribbean: Dead Man's Chest (2006), Alice in Wonderland (2010), Pirates of the Caribbean: On Stranger Tides (2011), Beauty and the Beast (2017), Aladdin (2019) and Lilo & Stitch (2025); and has released twelve animated films that have reached that milestone: Toy Story 3 (2010), Frozen (2013), Zootopia, Finding Dory (both in 2016), Incredibles 2 (2018), Toy Story 4, The Lion King, Frozen 2 (three in 2019), Inside Out 2, Moana 2 (both in 2024), Zootopia 2 (2025) and Toy Story 5 (2026).

Walt Disney Pictures was the first studio to have released two billion-dollar films in one year; this distinction was achieved in 2010 with Alice in Wonderland and Toy Story 3.

Highest-grossing films in North America
Rank	Title	Year	Gross
1	Inside Out 2	2024	$652,980,194
2	Incredibles 2	2018	$608,581,744
3	The Lion King	2019	$543,638,043
4	Beauty and the Beast	2017	$504,481,165
5	Finding Dory	2016	$486,131,416
6	Toy Story 5	2026	$480,294,461
7	Frozen 2	2019	$477,373,578
8	Moana 2	2024	$460,072,062
9	Toy Story 4	2019	$434,038,008
10	Zootopia 2	2025	$428,130,160
11	The Lion King^{‡}	1994	$424,979,720
12	Lilo & Stitch	2025	$423,778,855
13	Pirates of the Caribbean: Dead Man's Chest	2006	$423,315,812
14	Toy Story 3	2010	$415,004,880
15	Frozen	2013	$400,953,009
16	Finding Nemo^{‡}	2003	$380,843,261
17	The Jungle Book	2016	$364,001,123
18	Inside Out	2015	$356,002,827
19	Aladdin	2019	$355,559,216
20	Zootopia	2016	$344,612,160
21	Alice in Wonderland	2010	$334,191,110
22	Pirates of the Caribbean: At World's End	2007	$309,420,425
23	Pirates of the Caribbean: The Curse of the Black Pearl	2003	$305,413,918
24	The Little Mermaid	2023	$296,908,134
25	Up	2009	$293,004,164

Highest-grossing films worldwide
Rank	Title	Year	Gross
1	Zootopia 2	2025	$1,870,309,291
2	Inside Out 2	2024	$1,698,863,816
3	The Lion King	2019	$1,656,943,394
4	Frozen 2	2019	$1,450,026,933
5	Frozen	2013	$1,290,000,000
6	Beauty and the Beast	2017	$1,266,115,964
7	Incredibles 2	2018	$1,243,805,359
8	Toy Story 5	2026	$1,148,4256,809
9	Toy Story 4	2019	$1,073,394,593
10	Toy Story 3	2010	$1,067,171,911
11	Pirates of the Caribbean: Dead Man's Chest	2006	$1,066,179,725
12	Moana 2	2024	$1,059,269,477
13	Aladdin	2019	$1,050,693,953
14	Pirates of the Caribbean: On Stranger Tides	2011	$1,045,713,802
15	Lilo & Stitch	2025	$1,038,027,526
16	Finding Dory	2016	$1,028,570,889
17	Zootopia	2016	$1,025,784,195
18	Alice in Wonderland	2016	$1,025,467,110
19	The Lion King^{‡}	1994	$979,046,652
20	The Jungle Book	2016	$966,550,600
21	Pirates of the Caribbean: At World's End	2007	$963,420,425
22	Finding Nemo^{‡}	2003	$940,335,536
23	Inside Out	2015	$857,675,046
24	Coco	2017	$807,139,032
25	Pirates of the Caribbean: Dead Men Tell No Tales	2017	$794,826,541

^{‡}—Includes theatrical reissue(s).

== See also ==
- Walt Disney Studios (division)
- Walt Disney Studios Motion Pictures
- Walt Disney Television
