= Andrew W.K. discography =

Artist discography

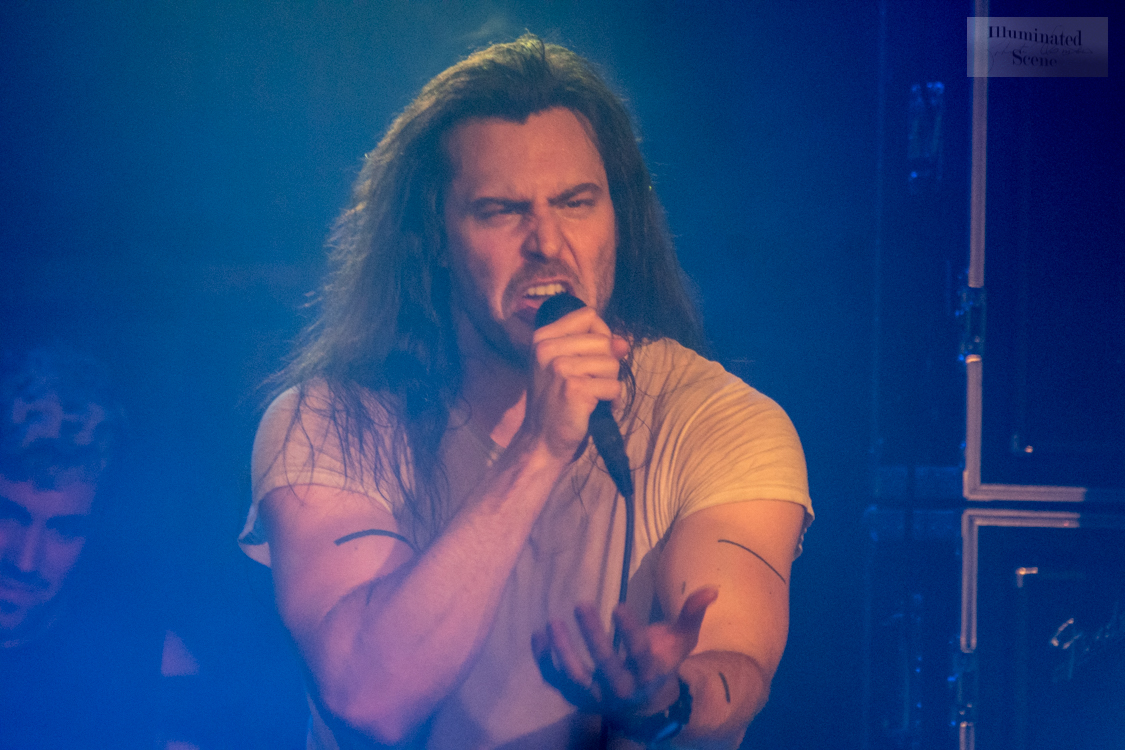
- Studio albums: 7
- Extended plays: 3
- Compilation albums: 3
- Singles: 15
- Video albums: 4
- Music videos: 7
- Splits: 2
- Japan cover albums: 2

The following is a comprehensive discography of Andrew W.K., an American rock musician.

== Albums ==
=== Studio albums ===
Year	Album	Chart positions						Certifications
Year	Album	US	US H/S	FIN	JPN	SWE	UK	Certifications
2001	I Get Wet: Released: November 13, 2001; Label: Island	84	1	32	39	59	71	BPI: Silver; RIAJ: Gold
2003	The Wolf: Released: September 9, 2003; Label: Island	61	–	–	14	–	152	
2006	Close Calls with Brick Walls: Released: July 5, 2006; Label: Universal Music	–	–	–	30	–	–	
2009	55 Cadillac: Released: September 8, 2009; Label: Ecstatic Peace!, Skyscraper Music Maker	–	–	–	–	–	–	
2018	You're Not Alone: Released: March 2, 2018; Label: Sony Music	197	–	–	–	–	–	
2021	God Is Partying: Released: September 10, 2021; Label: Napalm	–	–	–	–	–	–	
2026	Temptation to Exist: Released: August 28, 2026; Label: The Louise Harland Corporation	–	–	–	–	–	–	
"—" denotes a recording that did not chart or was not released in that territory.

=== Compilation albums ===
- The Very Best So Far (2008, Universal Music Japan)
- Premium Collection (2008, Universal Music Japan)
- Mother of Mankind "Rare & Unreleased 1999-2010" (2010, Steev Mike)

=== Unreleased albums ===
- We Want Fun (Unreleased LP originally intended as a debut album in 2001)
- The Carrier (Unreleased Rock 'n' Roll LP dating back to 2005)
- Young Lord (Unreleased experimental LP dating back to 2005)
- Unnamed instrumental (Unreleased piano-solo LP dating back to 2005)
- Eberwhite (Unreleased LP dating back to 2005)

== EPs ==
- Girls Own Juice (AWKGOJ) (EP) (2000, Bulb Records)
- Party Til You Puke (EP) (2000, Bulb Records)
- The "Party All Goddamn Night" EP (EP) (2011 Japan only EP) Universal Music Group

== Split releases ==
- A Wild Pear (Split 7" with The Evaporators) (2009, Mint Records, Nardwuar Records)
- We Got a Groove (Split 7" with Riverboat Gamblers) (2009, Volcom Entertainment)

== Singles ==
- "Room to Breathe" (sic) (under his full name, Andrew Wilkes-Krier) (1998, Hanson Records)
- "You Are What You Eat", (under his full name, Andrew Wilkes-Krier) (was to be 1998, went unreleased, Hanson Records)
- "Party Hard" (October 2001) - UK #19 - BPI: Silver
- "She Is Beautiful" (February 2002) - UK #55
- "We Want Fun" (December 2002)
- "Fun Night" (2002)
- "Tear It Up" (July 2003)
- "Never Let Down" (September 2003)
- "Long Live the Party" (2003, Japan only)
- "Son Nano Kankei Neh Rock" (2008, Japan only mobile ringtone)
- "Kiseki" (2008, Japan only) (Greeeen cover)
- "Chiisana Koi no Uta" (2008, Japan only) (Mongol800 cover, as "Little Love Song")
- "Kiba" (2010, Japan only, featured vocalist with Marty Friedman)
- "I'm a Vagabond" (7" vinyl single) (February 2010, Big Scary Monsters)
- "I Was Born to Love You" (2011, Japan only)
- "Go Go Go Go" (November 1, 2011) [The W.S.C.]
- "Party Till We Die" (September 26 2016) With MAKJ & Timmy Trumpet (Spinnin Records)
- "Music Is Worth Living For" (January 12, 2018)
- "Ever Again" (January 29, 2018)
- "My Tower" (January 15, 2021) (cancelled)
- "Babalon" (February 17, 2021, Napalm Records)
- "I'm in Heaven" (May 6, 2021, Napalm Records)

== Music videos ==
- Party Hard (2001)
- She Is Beautiful (2002)
- We Want Fun (2002)
- Never Let Down (2003)
- Your Rules (2003)
- Totally Stupid (2003)
- Long Live the Party (2003)
- Not Going to Bed (2007)
- Hearing What I Said (2009)
- I'm a Vagabond (2010)
- I Want to See You Go Wild (2010)
- GO GO GO GO (2011)
- It's Time to Party (2012)
- Ever Again (2018)
- Music Is Worth Living For (2018)
- You're Not Alone (2018)
- Babalon (2021)
- I'm In Heaven (2021)
- Everybody Sins (2021)

== DVDs ==
- Tear It Up DVD (2003) - Includes A.W.K. music videos and concert footage
- The Wolf Bonus DVD (2003) - Japanese import version, includes exclusive behind-the-scenes footage
- Who Knows? (2006) - Feature length live concert movie
- Close Calls With Brick Walls Bonus DVD (2006) - Japanese import version, includes exclusive A.W.K. footage

== Film and television soundtracks ==
- Out Cold feat. "She Is Beautiful"
- Jackass: The Movie feat. "We Want Fun"
- Stealing Harvard feat. "Party Hard"
- Old School feat. "Fun Night"
- Freaky Friday feat. "She Is Beautiful"
- Dance of the Dead feat. "You Will Remember Tonight"
- Masters of Horror Soundtrack feat. "You Will Remember Tonight"
- American Pie Presents: Band Camp feat. "She Is Beautiful"
- Aqua Teen Hunger Force Colon Movie Film for Theaters Colon the Soundtrack feat. "Party Party Party"

== Compilation appearances ==
- Labyrinths & Jokes (Hanson Records Release HN050) Song: Andrew Wilkes-Krier (Andrew also appeared on the Isis and Werewolves track and The Beast People track).
- "Dude, That's My Skull" feat. "We Want Fun" (2001, Island Records)
- Ozzfest 2002 Live Album feat. "She Is Beautiful" (Live with Kelly Osbourne)
- Take Action! Vol 4 feat. Spoken PSA Intro
- Mosh Pit On Disney feat. "Mickey Mouse Club March"
- Maxim Rocks! Magazine Compilation feat. "She Is Beautiful"
- Girls Gone Wild Music, Vol. 1 feat. "Party Hard"
- Hard to Get V1 Island Rarities feat. "We Want Fun" (AWKGOJ version)
- Warped Tour 2003 Tour Compilation feat. "Ready to Die"
- Serve 2: The Hard Rock Benefit Album feat. "This Is My World"
- 2776 feat. "Party on Your Grave"

== Production credits ==
- Fortune Dove EP - by Wolf Eyes (2000) Producer/Mixer
- Noon & Eternity - by To Live And Shave In L.A. (2006) Album Co-Producer/Mixer
- Repentance - by Lee "Scratch" Perry (2008) Album Co-Producer/Mixer
- Through the Panama - by Sightings (2007) Album Producer/Mixer
- DAMN! The Mixtape Vol. 1 - by Various artists (2009) Executive Producer/Producer
- Bangers & Beans EP - Aleister X (2009) Producer/Mixer
- The Git EP - Aleister X (2010) Producer/Mixer
- WERK The Remix EP - Cherie Lily (2010) Mixer/Remixer
- Regifted Light - Baby Dee (2011) Producer/Mixer

== Mixing credits ==
- Bastard EP - by Hifiklub (2009) Mixer
- How to Make Friends - by Hifiklub (2009) Mixer on tracks 1-4
- WERK The Remixes - by Cherie Lily (2010) Mixer on select tracks

== Performances ==
- "électricité" - by Mike Pachelli - featuring Andrew W.K. on piano (2007)
- Safe Inside the Day - by Baby Dee - featuring Andrew W.K. on bass guitar and drums (2008)
- "mc chris is dead" - by mc chris - featuring Andrew W.K.'s backing vocals on the song, "Never Give Up" (2008)
- "Birth Canal Blues STUDIO/LIVE" - by Current 93 - featuring Andrew W.K. on bass guitar (2008)
- "Anok Pe: Aleph at Hallucinatory Mountain" - by Current 93 - featuring Andrew W.K. on bass guitar, piano, and vocals (2009)
- "Sparks" - by Sahara Hotnights - featuring Andrew W.K.'s vocal duet on the song, "Mess Around" (2009)
- "Do They Know It's Christmas?" - by Fucked Up - featuring Andrew W.K.'s vocals along with other various artists. This is also a single.
- "Kiba" - by Marty Friedman - featuring Andrew W.K.'s vocals on both Japanese and English versions (2010)
- "I'm A Gonner" - by Matt & Kim and Soulja Boy - featuring Andrew W.K.'s vocals (2011)
- "I Hate Being Late When I'm Early" - by The Evaporators - Organ & Vocals, Written by Andrew W.K. (2012)
- "Bring It On Home" - by The Evaporators - Featuring Andrew W.K. on piano (2012)

== Remixes ==
- "We Sing of Only Blood or Love" - by Dax Riggs - featuring Andrew W.K. remixed song, "Dethbryte" (2007)
- "At Dawn (Vogel)" - by Pantaleimon - Remixed by Andrew W.K. (2008)
- "How We Roll" from "Dancing in a Minefield EP" - by Plushgun - Remixed by Andrew W.K. (2008)
- "Say Goodbye" - by Samuel - Remixed by Andrew W.K. (2009)
- "The Afterlife" - by YACHT (Jona Bechtolt) - Remixed by Andrew W.K. (2009)
- "Even Think" - by Drink Up Butter Cup - Remixed by Andrew W.K. (2009)
- "Devil Knows" - by Hifiklub - Remixed by Andrew W.K. (2009)
- "House Party" - by 3OH!3 - Remixed by Andrew W.K. (2010)
- "Felicia" - by The Constellations - Remixed by Andrew W.K. (2010)
- "Werk" - by Cherie Lily - Remixed by Princess Superstar and Andrew W.K. (2010)
- "Like It's Her Birthday" - by Good Charlotte - Remixed by Andrew W.K. (2010)
- "My Town" - by Hollywood Undead - Remixed by Andrew W.K. (2011)
- "Earthquakey People" - by Steve Aoki ft. Rivers Cuomo - Remixed by Andrew W.K. (2011)

== Video game appearances ==
- Andrew W.K. lent his voice to ESPN NFL 2K5; he is also unlockable as a free agent quarterback in the game.
- Andrew W.K. appears in Backyard Wrestling 2: There Goes The Neighborhood as a playable character, he also provides "Party Hard" and "Your Rules" to the soundtrack.
- Andrew W.K. provides "Party Hard" to the Pro Evolution Soccer 2010 OST.
- A cover of "Party Hard" by Brad Holmes appears on Guitar Freaks 9th Mix / drummania 8th Mix.
- "Party Hard" is available as a DLC track for the Rock Band games.
- "Tear It Up" is featured in NASCAR Thunder 2004.
- Andrew W.K Voices a Radio Host named "Red Eye" in Bethesda Game Studios Game Fallout 4 (2016) DLC Nuka World.
