= Cherie Lily =

Musician, businessperson, producer

- Origin: Chicago, U.S.
- Genres: Electronic dance music; House music; Pop music; hardcore punk; alternative rock
- Years active: 2002–present
- Labels: Peace Biscuit; Steev Mike; Chervana

Cherie Lily is an American musician, fitness instructor, and entertainment entrepreneur based in Chicago, Illinois. Her discography includes dance, pop, and punk subgenres, heavily incorporating queer club culture and fitness. As a Director of Talent Management at Voss Events, she worked with drag performers including Aquaria, Vanessa Vanjie, Kim Chi, and Plastique Tiara. As a music producer, she has arranged tracks for Yvie Oddly, Kevin Aviance, and Amanda Lepore. In 2025, she founded Chervana Music, a record label and creative collective supporting DJs, producers, and performing artists.

== Early music work ==
Cherie Lily began as a recording artist and vocalist in the punk band Cavity Girl and The Daggers in Eugene, Oregon. She moved to New York in 2002 and there founded alternative rock groups Spank and FlüRT. According to Get Out! Magazine, she was kicked out of the all-girl hard-core group, Skizonation because "she didn't have tattoos."

== Fitness career ==
Cherie Lily developed a following for her classes at fitness clubs throughout New York, training celebrities including Sia and Sam Endicott of The Bravery.

In 2011, Lily was featured on the Here TV television show Just Josh, where she recounted starting to teach fitness classes in college, demonstrated fitness steps, and discussed her newly released dance single "Werk." That same year, she was featured on two episodes Here TV's talk show Threesome, with a third appearance in 2013. In December 2013, Lily appeared on the CBS New York morning show Live from The Couch, demonstrating an aerobic routine as part of their "The Fit Minute" segment.

== Solo music career ==
In 2006, Cherie Lily began working on self-produced music that fused emergent electronic dance music styles with fitness steps and flamboyant visuals, a sub-genre she dubbed "HOUSEROBICS".

Lily produced music for fitness instruction and live performance, leading classes at gyms and performances at venues such as Santos Party House, Glasslands Gallery, and Los Angeles's Club Runway.

Her first solo release under the name Cherie Lily was 2010's "WERK," its titular track packaged as part of a remix EP featuring versions by Nita Aviance, Princess Superstar & Andrew W.K., and Soundwavve. That year, Lily portrayed the Virgin Mary on Thu Tran's comedy series Food Party on the IFC.

In 2012, she made a cameo as a lip-syncher in the official music video for Marina and The Diamonds's "Primadonna." She also performed at the Sled Island Music and Arts Festival in Calgary, Canada.

In 2013, she released The Dripping Wet EP, which featured the single "Body," a collaboration with producer Vjuan Allure described by Flavour Mag and described as "a throwback to 1989's hip house." It was listed among Resident Advisor's "A History of Ballroom Anthems in Ten Tracks" in 2025.

Another single from The Dripping Wet EP, "Kiss My Lips," was described by Get Out! Magazine as "a hard-thumping club track that flips the bird on old stereotypes of girls needing to wait on men to make the first move." The track was featured in a commercial for MTV's The Challenge, a dating reality competition.

In 2025, Lily released "Shade Served" under her newly formed Chervana imprint. Get Out!'s Ben Neslon called it a "a fierce fusion of rap, house, and hip-hop sensibilities — dark, powerful, and unapologetically emotional."

In Dancecult, a peer-reviewed journal for electronic dance music, professor madison moore listed Lily among "icons of the New York gay scene."

== Music production and songwriting ==
Cherie Lily is a multi-instrumentalist who uses an Ableton workstation, into which she records keyboards and guitar through an M-Audio digital interface. She has produced tracks for and with performers and DJs in the drag and LGBTQIA+ club music realms.

Lily is credited on tracks by Yvie Oddly, winner of RuPaul's Drag Race season 11, including the singles "Reading," and "Books," as well as the music video for "Hype" with Vanessa Vanjie Mateo which was premiered by Entertainment Tonight.

Lily has served as songwriter and producer for Amanda Lepore, on the singles "Come Closer" and "TEQUILA," as well as her 2024 holiday pop release "Turn the Heat Up," which was followed up by a dance remix with DJ Gomi the following year.

In 2025, Lily wrote and co-produced Kevin Aviance's "Bloodline," the second-to-last track on his first LP in over two decades, HIPPOPOTOMAS!. In a full-length feature about the Chervana Music release, Billboard Magazine referred to "Bloodline" as a standout track, calling it "a stunning ode to the resilience and power of the LGBTQ+ community of the past, the present and the future." The song's lyrics are inspired by Lily's conversations with Grandfather Hector Xtravaganza before he passed away in 2018.

== Collaborations ==
Cherie Lily is credited as a performer and producer on a number of projects with Andrew W.K., to whom she was married from 2008 to 2022. She sang on his 2006 album Close Calls with Brick Walls, and was a part of the band configuration that lasted for years, performing on Conan on TBS and various festivals, including Warped Tour. She contributed as a producer on his album You're Not Alone and is credited as an engineer on his 2009 solo piano album 55 Cadillac. She also contributed vocals to the W.K.-produced 2009 Lee "Scratch" Perry album Repentance, which earned a Grammy nomination for Best Reggae Album.

Lily is listed alongside W.K. as a member of To Live and Shave in L.A., a Miami Beach-based experimental noise collective, for the recording sessions that would become the four-part anthology The Grief that Shrieked to Multiply.

In 2011, Lily provided backing vocals on the Diplo-produced single "Slight Work" on Wale (rapper)'s album Ambition (Wale album) featuring Big Sean.

In 2015, Lily was featured as a vocalist on "Dance Like You Got Good Credit", "Spicy!", and "What's the T?" (with Alyssa Edwards) by Cazwell.

== Business roles ==
In 2019, Cherie Lily joined Voss Events as a talent manager, stewarding the careers of drag performers including Aquaria, Kameron Michaels, Violet Chachki, Gottmik, Yvie Oddly, and Willow Pill, among others. The majority of these clients were at one time contestants on the drag competition reality TV show RuPaul's Drag Race. She was later promoted to Director of Partnerships & Music.

She founded Chervana Music, a label, production house, and creative collective in 2025. Kevin Aviance's album HIPPOPOTAMUS!, released by Chervana, was premiered exclusively by Billboard Magazine on October 10 of that year. Chervana Music's roster also includes Amanda Lepore, DJ Gomi, DJ HAI-LIFE, Richie Beretta, Cazwell, Jen DM, and more.
