= The "Party All Goddamn Night" EP =

EP by Andrew W.K.
- Released: March 30, 2011 (digital); April 13, 2011 (CD)
- Length: 24:34
- Label: Universal Music Group
- Producer: Steev Mike

Andrew W.K. chronology
Gundam Rock (2009)	The "Party All Goddamn Night" EP (2011)	You're Not Alone (2018)

The "Party All Goddamn Night" EP is the third EP by American musician Andrew W.K., released in 2011 only in Japan. None of the songs featured on this EP had previously been released, apart from "I'm a Vagabond" which was featured on the 2010 album Mother of Mankind and was also released as a single in the UK, and "I Was Born to Love You" which had been released as a single on Japanese iTunes in January 2011.

== Track listing ==
No.	Title	Writer(s)	Length
1.	"Party All Goddamn Night"	Andrew Wilkes-Krier	3:22
2.	"Everybody's Raging"	Wilkes-Krier, D.F. Anson	3:45
3.	"I Sold My Soul"	Wilkes-Krier	3:45
4.	"Head Bang"	Wilkes-Krier, K.M. Rancourt	3:34
5.	"I'm a Vagabond"	Wilkes-Krier	2:42
6.	"We're All Women"	Wilkes-Krier, P. Yanowitz	3:55
7.	"I Was Born to Love You" (Queen cover)	Freddie Mercury	3:28
Total length:			24:34

== Notes ==
- Around the time of release, Andrew W.K. had revealed on his website that some of the songs featured on this EP will also be featured on an upcoming studio album. While no songs were directly reused, the song "Everybody's Raging" was reworked into "Ever Again" for his 2018 album You're Not Alone. "I Sold My Soul" would later be reworked and re-recorded as "Not Anymore" which features as a bonus track on the CD version of Andrew W.K.'s 2021 album God Is Partying.
- "We're All Women" was written when Andrew was paired with Pedro Yanowitz at Fools Banquet, a song writing retreat hosted by Hanson in 2007. It was originally roughly recorded and then was re-recorded for the EP version.
