= Party til You Puke =

EP by Andrew W.K.
- Released: October 12, 2000
- Genres: Hard rock; pop metal; power pop
- Length: 21:46
- Label: Bulb
- Producer: Andrew W.K.

Andrew W.K. chronology
AWKGOJ (EP) (2000)	Party til You Puke (2000)	I Get Wet (2001)

Party til You Puke is the second EP by American rock musician Andrew W.K., released in October 2000. It is an electronic-based album, unlike its guitar-based predecessor, AWKGOJ. It was initially released on vinyl by Bulb Records, later being released on CD in the United States by Bulb Records as well as Academy Records (a record label established just for the release by Bulb founder Pete Larson) and in Japan by P-Vine Records.

== Track listings ==
=== Vinyl ===
1. "Party til You Puke"
2. "Party til You Puke (Remix)"
3. "Party til You Puke (Shout Out Remix)"
4. "Old Man (Couch Cover)"
5. "Dance Party (Anti-Never Ending Music Mix)"
6. "I Want to Kill (Build-It-Up Club Mix)"

=== CD ===
1. "Party til You Puke"
2. "Party til You Puke (Remix)"
3. "Party til You Puke (Shout Out Remix)"
4. "Dance Party (Anti-Never Ending Music Mix)"
5. "I Want to Kill (Build-It-Up Club Mix)"
6. "Old Man (Couch Cover)"
- The mixes of some of the songs on the CD are considerably longer than that on the vinyl.

== Trivia ==
- Some of the tracks on the vinyl release are significantly shorter than the tracks on the CD versions.
- "Party til You Puke" was re-recorded and included on Andrew's first album, I Get Wet.
- "Dance Party" was re-worked into the song "Long Live the Party" for Andrew's second album; The Wolf.
- The original pressing of the vinyl version of this EP came with an insert.
- Andrew's first full-length release, according to the Bulb Records website as of the year 2000, was supposed to contain all of the tracks on this EP, plus 10 other tracks, which were to be remixes and brand new tracks. It was supposed to be in CD format, and only 1,000 copies were to be pressed. This plan was ultimately scrapped, and some of the tracks that were to be on the album went on to be included on Andrew's first and second major-label albums, I Get Wet and The Wolf.
- It was planned at one point in time that some of the tracks on this EP were to be incorporated into Andrew's second major label album, The Wolf.

== Personnel ==
- Andrew W.K. – vocals, keyboards
- Tony Allen – drums, electronic drums
- Jeff Holmes – keyboards, programming
