= Vedder Vedder Bedwetter =

Studio album by To Live and Shave in L.A.
- Released: May 16, 1995
- Recorded: December 1994 – January 1995
- Studio: Various: The Green Room; (Ypsilanti, Michigan); The Knitting Factory; (New York City); Local 506; (Detroit, Michigan); Lounge AX; (Chicago, Illinois); Waterwork; (Miami, Florida); Zoot's; (Chapel Hill, North Carolina)
- Genre: Noise
- Length: 71:24
- Label: Fifth Colvmn
- Producer: Tom Smith

To Live and Shave in L.A. chronology
30-minuten männercreme (1994)	Vedder Vedder Bedwetter (1995)	"23" of 26 State and Federal Obscenity Determinations (1995)

Vedder Vedder Bedwetter is the third studio album by To Live and Shave in L.A., released on May 16, 1995 by Fifth Colvmn Records. It is recognized by critics as a particularly "harsh" entry in the noise music genre.

== Music ==
Vocalist Tom Smith spent the free time he had during the recording sessions of 30-minuten männercreme to mix the album, while Frank Falestra continued to record his own parts for their debut. The album included sessions taped with Don Fleming at Waterworks in NYC, radio and live performances recording during the band's 1996 tour that featured accompaniment by Weasel Walter and Nándor Névai and their own live performances without collaborators. Smith attributes being inexperienced as a recording technician and said:

"I wish I'd done Vedder Vedder Bedwetter differently. There were no programs for editing and I had to get tricky sequencing tracks. We had two different DAT machines, so the bridging tracks sometimes got lost or the timing wasn't right. We couldn't cut it accurately like you can with software. It's a little messy."

== Release and reception ==
Sonic Boom was thoroughly negative towards the band and their music, saying "the feedback coupled with the screaming vocals of which not a single intelligible word can be understood lacks any enticement that would allow for the establishment of a fan base." Despite reserved expectations, Jeff Bagato at Washington City Paper mostly enjoyed the album while noting the "impenetrable" nature of the music's noise genre.

Composers Frank Falestra and Tom Smith share opposing views of the album, with Falestra holding that it represents a strong point in the band's career while Smith describes it as "oafish bluster" and considers it the band's worst work. Writer Andrew Earles accused the work of not being "biting" or modern despite the intention to illustrate such in artist's name and album titles. The Flying Luttenbachers bandleader Weasel Walter, guitar, tenor saxophone, trombone, has also expressed his dissatisfaction with the end result.

== Track listing ==
No.	Title	Length
1.	"5 Seconds Off Your Ass"	3:26
2.	"Grams, Paths"	0:25
3.	"Pig Off, Ass Full"	1:40
4.	"Bucks, Rears and Throws the Rider"	2:34
5.	"Dungstar Supervivisect!"	0:29
6.	"Throws Cunt a Tear"	2:10
7.	"O. Ruddock D. "H.S. Mauberly""	0:27
8.	"Long-Drawn and Staccato "Lousy Dime""	2:34
9.	"Shits Upon the Debris And Burns"	3:04
10.	"Handballed "Viet"-Clasp"	0:25
11.	"The The, Which Radiance Overdrenched"	3:00
12.	"In Such Wise She Cannot Stir"	3:15
13.	"Miff Mole, Witch-Leery Scot"	0:29
14.	"Shut the Second She Clawed"	3:16
15.	"Rug Trilogy: Christus"	0:22
16.	"Like the Two-Part "Nod""	3:20
17.	"Nigh to the HM Threshold"	3:22
18.	"M. Polk, Prop."	0:33
19.	"Cobwebs With "Trap" Primrose"	3:29
20.	"Glas Employed an Urn"	0:29
21.	"Schwann Death in June Reference"	5:00
22.	""Good Bait" Made Butt of Insult"	0:40
23.	"The Sink Mentioned in the Scriptures"	3:12
24.	"Rubberist, Unwept"	0:23
25.	"The The Perms"	3:20
26.	"And Hammer, The Crown of Thorns"	1:56
27.	"From Gloss "Polytope" Flexi"	0:26
28.	""A", The Swinging She-River"	2:06
29.	"Blind Hole Without a Piss-Eye"	2:45
30.	""Ulalume"/Fram Decal Split"	0:27
31.	"Brother Falling, Twat From Fool"	2:42
32.	"Left Bro. at Doors"	3:47
33.	"T.C.B. Drop-Skirt"	0:52
34.	"Die, One and Five"	4:59

== Personnel ==
Adapted from the Vedder Vedder Bedwetter liner notes.

To Live and Shave in L.A.

- Frank Falestra (as Rat Bastard) – bass guitar, engineering (1–5, 7, 9, 10, 12, 13, 15, 17, 18, 20, 23, 24, 26, 27, 29, 30, 33)
- Ben Wolcott – oscillator, echoplex
- Tom Smith – lead vocals, electronics, production, recording and engineering (1–5, 7, 9, 10, 12, 13, 15, 17, 18, 20, 23, 24, 26, 27, 29, 30, 33)

Additional performers

- Bill Orcutt – guitar (1, 3, 4, 9, 12, 17, 23, 26, 29)
- Don Fleming – guitar and backing vocals (22)
- Ned Hayden – alto saxophone (11)
- Jared Hendrickson – guitar (6, 11, 14, 19, 25, 28, 31, 32), backing vocals (19)
- Nándor Névai – trombone (8), guitar (10)
- Weasel Walter – guitar (4, 6, 7, 10), tenor saxophone (8, 34), trombone (34)

Production and design

- Greg Chapman – liner notes
- Zalman Fishman – executive-production
- Syd – illustrations
- Greg Talenfeld – engineering, recording and mixing (6, 11, 14, 16, 19, 22, 25, 28, 31)

== Release history ==
Region	Date	Label	Format	Catalog
United States	1995	Fifth Colvmn	CD	9868-63189
