= She's Living for This =

- Created by: Keith Levy; Josh Rosenzweig
- Starring: Sherry Vine
- Composer: Matt Doers
- Country of origin: United States
- Original language: English
- No. of seasons: 2
- No. of episodes: 12

Production
- Executive producers: Paul Colichman; Stephen P. Jarchow
- Running time: 30 minutes
- Production company: Here Media

Original release
- Network: here!
- Release: February 24, 2012 – August 8, 2013

She's Living for This is an American television comedy and variety series created by Keith Levy and Josh Rosenzweig. The show currently airs on LGBT cable network here!. The series stars drag performer Sherry Vine. The series premiered on February 24, 2012.

here! produced six episodes for season one. The network announced a second season of the show to begin production in the summer 2012 for a fall 2012 premiere.

In 2012, it was announced that episodes of She's Living for This would be made available on online video service Hulu.

== Premise ==
She's Living for This provides a modern update on the classic TV variety show standard set by the likes of Sonny & Cher, Carol Burnett, and Benny Hill. Each half-hour episode features LGBT comics and entertainers. The show consists of comedy sketches, special guests, musical numbers, and short films.

== Cast ==
=== Main cast ===
- Sherry Vine serves as the show's host and takes on various roles during the various skits and performances.

=== Guest stars ===
- Candis Cayne
- Justin Vivian Bond
- Joey Arias
- Cazwell
- Peppermint
- Bianca Del Rio
- Sharon Needles

=== Recurring cast ===
- Sam Pancake
- David Ilku
- Busted
- Tina Burner

== Episodes ==
=== Series overview ===
Season	Episodes	Originally released	
Season	Episodes	First released	Last released
1	6	February 24, 2012	May 4, 2012
2	6	May 30, 2013	August 8, 2013

=== Season 1 (2012) ===
No. overall	No. in season	Title	Original release date
1	1	"The Justin Vivan Bond Episode"	February 24, 2012
2	2	"The Peppermint Episode"	March 9, 2012
3	3	"The Joey Arias Episode"	March 23, 2012
4	4	"The Cazwell Episode"	April 6, 2012
5	5	"The Bianca Del Rio Episode"	April 20, 2012
6	6	"The Candis Cayne Episode"	May 4, 2012

=== Season 2 (2013) ===
No. overall	No. in season	Title	Original release date
7	1	"The Pandora Boxx Episode"	May 30, 2013
8	2	"The Varla Jean Merman Episode"	June 13, 2013
9	3	"The Jackie Beat Episode"	June 27, 2013
10	4	"The Pam Ann Episode"	July 11, 2013
11	5	"The Lady Bunny Episode"	July 25, 2013
12	6	"The Jonny McGovern Episode"	August 8, 2013

== Production ==
The concept for She's Living for This began 20 years ago in Los Angeles. Keith Levy asked director Josh Rosenzweig to collaborate on a project. Keith was just developing Sherry Vine and he wanted to do a play- a theatrical piece as Sherry. So, he chose a one-woman show call ‘’Sorry Wrong Number’’ and when they finished, Josh said to him that he was a modern-day drag version of Carol Burnett and that he should have my own variety show.

Over the course of the next two decades, Josh and Keith worked together on plays, musicals, music videos, television shows and films. Two of the "featurettes" they did together Scream Teen Scream and Charlie! played in film festivals.

All along the way, the idea of the variety show was kept alive. Last year, Josh said he thought he could get it produced at here, with the help of general manager Eric Feldman. They finally started shooting in the fall of 2011.
