= Who Knows? (video) =

2006 DVD by Andrew W.K.

- DVD Cover
- Directed by: M. Manrike
- Written by: J. Somel, Cris Durlester, Holly LeSavoy
- Produced by: Grata Video, R. Jayne / R.C.U.
- Starring: Andrew W.K., Big Daddy, Brian "Archie Angel" Benson, Donald "D.T." Tardy, E. Payne, Gregg Roberts, Jeff Victor, Jimmy Coup, John Frank Werner, Kendall A., Richie Russo
- Edited by: Mike Varga, Dave Keith, Matt Hensel, Matt Lewis, Dave Elphick
- Music by: Andrew W.K.
- Distributed by: Music Video Distributors
- Release date: February 7, 2006
- Running time: 75 minutes
- Countries: United States; Japan
- Language: English

Who Knows? is the first live DVD by American musician Andrew W.K., released on February 7, 2006.

Sync-stacking, a state-of-the-art process in which many video and audio clips of many different concerts can be spliced together into one video without losing the flow of the song or sounding different, was used.

Five screenings of the DVD were presented in New York City and Hollywood, in February and April 2006 by Andrew. His father presented a screening of the movie in Ann Arbor, Michigan at the University of Michigan Law School. Although Andrew's father, law professor James E. Krier was said to be the host of the event, Andrew was present at the screening also.

PopMatters rated it four stars.

== Track listing ==
1. "Violent Life"
2. "Victory Strikes Again"
3. "Long Live the Party"
4. "We Want Fun"
5. "Ready to Die"
6. "It's Time to Party"
7. "Take It Off"
8. "Make Sex"
9. "Totally Stupid"
10. "Girls Own Love"
11. "She Is Beautiful"
12. "Tear It Up"
13. "I Love NYC"
14. "I Get Wet"
15. "Never Let Down"
16. "Party Hard"
