= The DHDFD's =

New Zealand garage punk band

The DHDFD's (rumoured to mean "Don't Have Dogs For Dinner") are a four-piece New Zealand garage punk band who formed during the summer of 2005 in the Point Chevalier area of Auckland New Zealand. They released a five track E.P, "Pastor of Muppets", in September 2006 which has subsequently sold out, going on to record a video for their single "Pompino's Magical Blast", receiving considerable rotation on Alt TV. The band have played alongside such internationally recognised acts as King Brothers, The Mint Chicks, The Black Lips, and local artists Rackets, The Demi Whores, and Pika few, as well as the 2009 Big Day Out festival in Auckland.

Their live shows have drawn both acclaim and criticism for their anarchic, chaotic performance – in mid 2008, Scot Brown's ascension of the lighting rig at Auckland venue Space saw the group barred for the foreseeable future.

== Influences ==
The DHDFD's cite influences as diverse as Dead Kennedys, Bad Brains, Frank Zappa, The Melvins, The Easybeats, Beach Boys. Their energetic live shows have drawn comparisons to the likes of The Jesus Lizard, Black Flag, The Stooges and 2008 touring buddies King Brothers.

== Tours ==
- 2007 New Zealand Tour Mint Chicks VS The DHDFD's
- 2008 Japan "Tour of Hells Across Japan" The DHDFD's Vs King Brothers and Watusi Zombie
- 2014 King Brothers Vs DHDFD Split Ep Tour of Japan
- 2014 King Brothers Summer Family tour of New Zealand
- 2015 King Brothers Summer Family tour of Japan

== Discography ==
- 2006 – Pastor of Muppets (Self-Released)
- 2008 – Fromage Du Pouvior (Mole Music)
- 2012 – French Fries (Hell is Now Love)
- 2015 – Please Speak Positively, Delicate Flower (Hell Is Now Love)

== Past members ==
- Eric Scholes, Bass 2005–2011
- Tom Bisset, Drums 2008–2011
- Alex Brown, Drums 2007–2008
- Nathan McEvoy, Guitar 2005–2007
- Michael Molloy, Bass 2005-2005
- Matt Brearley, Drums 2005–2007
- Tame Iti (Activist), Mascot 2005–2008
- James Macdonald, Drums 2011–2013
- Jacob Moore, Drums 2013–2014
- Pete Dalebrook, Drums 2014–2015
- Emlyn Williams, Drums 2015–2016
- Scot Brown 2026-Current
