= Andrew W.K. =

American rock musician (born 1979)

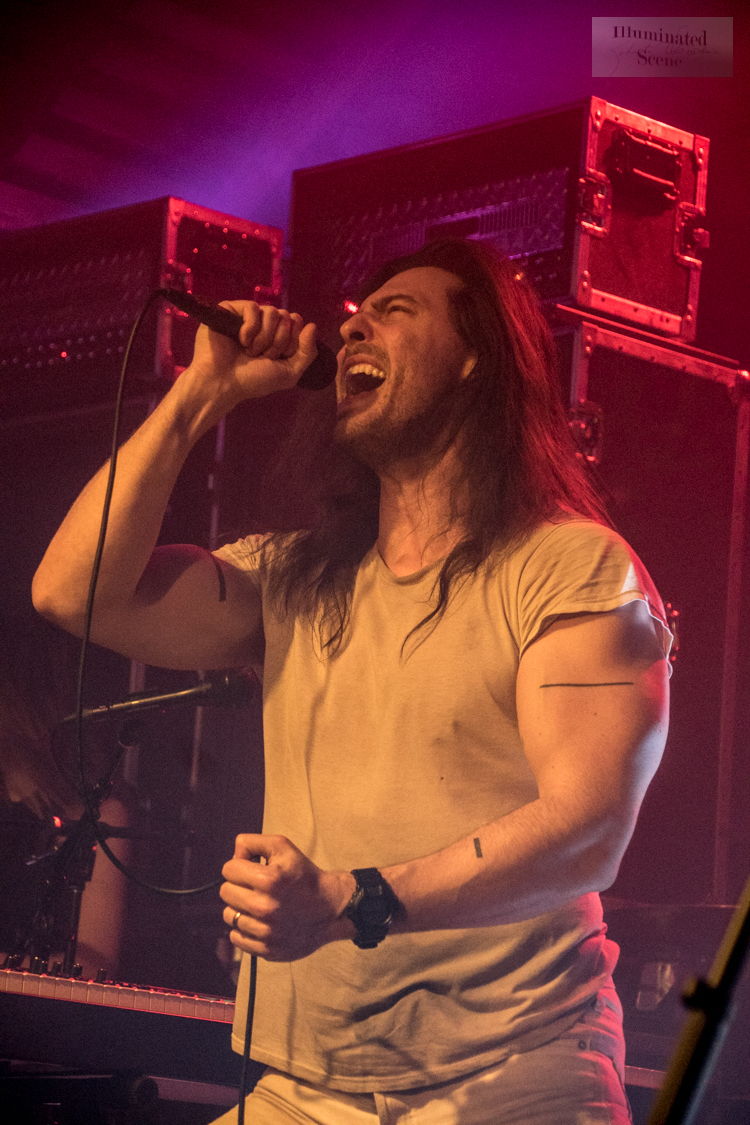
- Wilkes-Krier performing in 2018
- Born: Andrew Fetterly Wilkes-Krier; May 9, 1979 (age 47); Stanford, California, US
- Occupations: Musician; singer; songwriter; record producer; motivational speaker; actor
- Years active: 1993–present
- Spouses: Cherie Lily (m. 2008; div. 2019) Kat Dennings (m. 2023)
- Children: 2
- Father: James E. Krier
- Musical career
- Origin: Ann Arbor, Michigan, US
- Genres: Hard rock; pop metal; heavy metal
- Instruments: Vocals; piano; keyboards; guitar; bass; drums
- Works: Discography
- Labels: Hanson; Bulb; Island; Mercury; Universal; Ecstatic Peace!; Skyscraper Music Maker; Steev Mike; Sony; Napalm
- Member of: To Live and Shave in L.A.
- Website: andrewwk.com

Andrew Fetterly Wilkes-Krier (born May 9, 1979), known professionally as Andrew W.K., is an American singer, multi-instrumentalist, songwriter, record producer and motivational speaker. He is known for his combination of rock, metal and pop music and anthemic songs about partying. Raised in Michigan, Wilkes-Krier began his musical career in the mid-1990s. He performed in a number of local bands before eventually moving to New York, where he produced his first recordings under the Andrew W.K. moniker.

After gaining initial attention with the 2000 EP Girls Own Juice, Wilkes-Krier rose to prominence with the release of his debut studio album I Get Wet in November 2001, which was followed by The Wolf (2003) and Close Calls With Brick Walls (2006). Legal troubles preventing Wilkes-Krier from releasing music in the US led up to him making the album 55 Cadillac (2009), which consists of solo improvisational piano pieces. He returned to rock music with the albums You're Not Alone (2018) and God Is Partying (2021). The instrumental jazz-noir album Temptation to Exist (2026) was surprise released after a five-year hiatus. He has also undertaken a number of other musical and non-musical ventures including television and radio work, motivational speaking and writing.

== Early life ==
Andrew Fetterly Wilkes-Krier was born in Stanford, California, on May 9, 1979 and raised in the outskirts of Los Angeles, until moving to Ann Arbor, Michigan at the age of four. His father is professor James E. Krier, a legal scholar at the University of Michigan Law School and co-author of the widely used Dukeminier & Krier property casebook. His mother is Wendy Wilkes. His younger brother, Patrick, was a golf professional and is now a golf coach in Michigan. At the age of four, Wilkes-Krier began learning piano at the University of Michigan School of Music. He has recalled early family trips to midnight mass as having had an enormous impact on his love for music. He was dubbed Andrew W.K. by an elementary school teacher to differentiate him from his classmates Andrew Cohen and Andrew Gilchrist. He later attended the private college preparatory Greenhills School for middle school before attending the alternative Community High School from 1993 to 1997, where he continued to study piano and keyboard.

== Music career ==
=== 1993–1999: Early career ===
In 1993, at the age of 14, he joined the band Slam, later to be called Reverse Polarity. In 1996, a song recorded by W.K. entitled "Mr. Surprise" was included on Plant the Flower Seeds, a compilation by the Ypsilanti, Michigan-based record label Westside Audio Laboratories, marking his first publicly released recording. Over the next five years, W.K. would play in a number of Detroit-based punk rock and heavy metal bands, including The Pterodactyls; Lab Lobotomy; Music Band; Mr. Velocity Hopkins; playing drums in grindcore metal band, Kathode; in addition to forming the noise rock project Ancient Art of Boar, later known as AAB, which served as an outlet for his early solo material.

In 1998, W.K. moved from Michigan to New York City, where he worked a variety of short-lived jobs. These included a bubblegum machine salesman, an opera ticket salesman, a fashion photographer, a window decorator at the Bergdorf Goodman department store, and a waiter for a Mexican restaurant. He also worked at the offices of the avant-garde fashion company Comme des Garçons. He ended the AAB project and began recording new solo material under his full "Andrew Wilkes-Krier" name; the year saw the release of a cassette-only single entitled Room to Breathe on Hanson Records. A follow-up release entitled You Are What You Eat was scrapped when the master recordings went missing. W.K. also recorded the soundtrack for an independent film named Poltergeist made by Aaron Dilloway and himself, one track of which appeared on the Hanson Records compilation Labyrinths & Jokes. In 1999, he moved to Seffner, Florida, to start building his live band with drummer Donald "D.T." Tardy, of death metal band Obituary.

=== 2000–2003: Solo breakthrough, I Get Wet and The Wolf ===
In March 2000, Wilkes-Krier released his first EP, Girls Own Juice, also abbreviated as AWKGOJ, on Bulb Records, his first solo release under the moniker Andrew W.K. (He had first been credited as "Andrew W.K." on a remix entitled "Wolf Eyes Rules (What Kinda Band?)" for the experimental noise band Wolf Eyes.) Girls Own Juice introduced his hard rock-influenced musical style and experimental tendencies, described as "Judas Priest mixed with Sparks" by Magas, a collaborator of W.K.'s.

Girls Own Juice was well received by critics, and was awarded a five-star rating by the British music magazine Kerrang!. The release increased buzz for W.K., centered around his "hedonistic, so-dumb-it's-smart rawk." He continued to build his reputation by performing various solo gigs in the New York and other East Coast areas. Wilkes-Krier and his then manager Matt Sweeney later shipped out a number of Andrew W.K. demo tapes, each accompanied by a handwritten letter. One tape reached alternative rock musician Dave Grohl; impressed, Grohl offered Andrew W.K. a slot opening for his band Foo Fighters at a concert in San Francisco, which he accepted.

Another tape reached The Island Def Jam Music Group executive Lewis Largent, who liked the demos enough to attend an Andrew W.K. gig at the Mercury Lounge, where Largent was impressed by how W.K. "won over every last person in the audience." Wilkes-Krier reacted with surprise to Island's interest in him, and despite his manager urging him not to accept his very first offer, W.K. was eager to begin work with Island. Girls Own Juice was followed by another Bulb Records EP entitled Party Til You Puke in October 2000. Following the release of Party Til You Puke, Andrew W.K. left Bulb Records amicably to sign with Island Records.

W.K.'s major-label debut studio album, I Get Wet, was released on November 13, 2001, on Island Records. Continuing the sound established by his previous Bulb Records EPs, I Get Wet is characterized by its metal and punk rock influences and lyrical content revolving around partying. The album is known for its cover art, a photograph by Roe Ethridge of Andrew W.K. with a stream of blood running from his nose onto his chin and neck, which generated minor controversy in Europe after it was seen to represent cocaine abuse; W.K. claims to have achieved the effect by striking himself in the face with a cinderblock during the photo shoot, and subsequently supplementing his own blood with some of an animal obtained from a butcher's shop.

I Get Wet earned positive press from publications such as NME and Kerrang! and featured two UK hit singles, "Party Hard" and "She Is Beautiful", also rising to the top spot on Billboard's Top Heatseekers albums chart. She Is Beautiful was also featured on the 2003 Freaky Friday soundtrack. At the same time, W.K. also developed a reputation for his highly energetic live shows. Andrew W.K. joined Ozzy Osbourne's Ozzfest that summer, and a number of I Get Wet's tracks, such as "Party Hard", "It's Time to Party", and "Fun Night" were licensed for use in various video games, films, TV series, and commercials. In 2002, W.K., Gibson Goodness and Alec Rominger re-recorded his song "We Want Fun" from AWKGOJ for the soundtrack of Jackass: The Movie; an accompanying music video was also produced, filmed and directed by Jeff Tremaine with additional camera work by Spike Jonze. By September 2018, the album had sold 267,000 copies in the US.

In late 2003, W.K. released his second studio album The Wolf. In contrast to I Get Wet, which was recorded by W.K. with his live band, The Wolf featured W.K. playing all instruments, with heavy use of overdubbing of these instrument sections in production. The album spawned the singles "Tear It Up" and "Never Let Down" in the United States, while the song "Long Live the Party" was a minor hit in Japan. The single "Tear It Up" was included as menu music in the video-game Nascar Thunder TM 2004. Despite earning Andrew W.K.'s highest chart position ever at #61 on the Billboard 200, it fell off after only a week, and three months after its release the album had only sold 36,098 copies.

On tour for The Wolf, W.K. was injured on stage and broke his foot. After the concert, he signed autographs from the ambulance. Not wanting to let his fans down, he performed the remainder of the tour in a wheelchair.

=== 2004–2008: Close Calls with Brick Walls ===
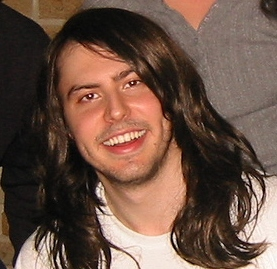
W.K. in 2006

Though Close Calls with Brick Walls failed to see wide release in 2006, W.K. continued to be active; he released a live concert DVD entitled Who Knows? in February of that year and presenting five screenings of the film in New York and Hollywood. In March 2006, during an episode of Sex Pistols guitarist Steve Jones' radio show Jonesy's Jukebox, W.K. debuted a new song entitled "I'm a Vagabond". On November 26, 2008, under Universal Music Group, he released his fourth studio album, The Japan Covers, which consists of cover versions of J-pop songs, as well as a compilation entitled The Very Best So Far.

=== 2009–2019: 55 Cadillac, You're Not Alone and other releases ===
In February 2009, Wilkes-Krier claimed to have found a loophole in his contractual constraints allowing him to form his own record label, Skyscraper Music Maker, based in London and Manhattan. The label released DAMN! The Mix tape Vol. 1 on May 25, 2009, a compilation of W.K.'s production work for Skyscraper Music Maker artists Bad Brilliance, Aleister X, and Cherie Lily, with music by New York producer, DJ B-Roc. Wilkes-Krier's fifth studio album 55 Cadillac served as the label's second release. Recorded entirely by Wilkes-Krier and consisting of his spontaneous solo piano improvisations, the album was released on September 8, 2009. In a piece written to accompany the release of the album, he explained that the last decade had "been so fraught with legal trouble" that he began to suffer hallucinations, which inspired him to produce the album, and that successful negotiations had allowed him to start a new label and release 55 Cadillac, which he described as "the sound of a piano being played by a free man – nothing more, nothing less." New negotiations were undertaken over the UK release of 55 Cadillac, as "certain people [who] weren't credited because they weren't involved with the recording... had to be given credit," owing to previous contracts. Wilkes-Krier and his management settled by renaming Skyscraper Music Maker as Steev Mike, which the parties involved saw as a reasonable compromise. All prior complaints were dropped and Wilkes-Krier was then allowed to release the album worldwide.

On September 9, Andrew W.K. released a Japan-only album entitled Gundam Rock, consisting of covered music from the Gundam anime television series to celebrate its 30th anniversary in Japan; he had been approached by Japanese animation studio Sunrise Inc. to record the album following the success of The Japan Covers. With all prior legal disputes over credit and naming settled, in March 2010 Andrew W.K. and the newly named Steev Mike label presented its first official release: a repackaged two-disc version of Close Calls with Brick Walls with a bonus disc of rare and unreleased material entitled Mother of Mankind. To promote the set, Andrew W.K. joined the 2010 Warped Tour as a headlining act for the entire tour. A music video for the single "I Want to See You Go Wild" from Close Calls with Brick Walls, directed by Peter Glantz, was released in June 2010.

In March 2011, Andrew W.K. released a new EP entitled The "Party All Goddamn Night" EP, which consists of five new tracks and two previously released singles. In September 2012, while attending a fan convention for My Little Pony: Friendship Is Magic, he expressed the possibility of recording a new album. In a Reddit "Ask Me Anything" thread in October 2014, Wilkes-Krier stated that while his other career ventures had kept him from releasing a new studio album, he was eager to record one: "I've been stock-piling new songs for several years. I really want to make a new album as soon as possible."

In September 2017, W.K. announced that a new studio album would be set for release on March 2, 2018, via Sony Music. In November, he announced its title, You're Not Alone, and shared its cover artwork. The album was released on March 2, 2018. In August 2018 he revealed to Riff Magazine that he had begun recording his next album.

=== 2020–present: Napalm Records, God Is Partying, Temptation To Exist and current ventures ===
In October 2020, Andrew W.K. signed with Napalm Records and announced that he was working on a new album. The lead single "Babalon" was released on February 17, 2021. "Babalon" was announced via a Napalm Records press release and made available for limited pre-order on the Napalm Records and Andrew W.K. stores as a 7" vinyl with the instrumental B-Side "The Party Gods". The release, limited to 393 copies, marked a departure from Andrew W.K.'s traditionally positive and uplifting themes, and features "swinging drums and a sinister guitar riff opening the track's hellish gates."

Andrew W.K.'s sixth studio album, God Is Partying, was released on September 10, 2021. Co-produced by long-time recording partner Ted Young, the nine-track album features W.K. performing all instruments. The announcement was accompanied by the release of a new single, "I'm in Heaven". On July 14, 2021, the video for "Everybody Sins" was released and features an appearance by Kat Dennings. In September 2021, the album God Is Partying was released alongside the single "Stay True To Your Heart".

Shortly after the release of the album, W.K. delayed upcoming shows and deleted his website and social media pages with no explanation; his label also remained quiet on what was happening.

On August 28, 2026, W.K. released the album Temptation to Exist on the fan run website AWKSHARE and through YouTube Music.

== Other ventures ==
=== Self-help and motivational performance ===
During 2007, Andrew performed a series of unpredictable happenings as part of his "One Man Show" tour. Each event began with Andrew improvising on the piano alone on a stage before they frequently evolved into giant parties, with most of the audience dancing on stage with Andrew, themselves playing the piano and singing the lyrics.

In March 2007, The New York Times put Andrew on the front page of its Arts section, in a feature article on Andrew's lectures. In 2008, Andrew's self-help work led to his second appearance as a sit-down guest on Late Night with Conan O'Brien. In November 2008, Time magazine called him "truly cute".

In June 2012, W.K. announced that he would be appearing at the My Little Pony: Friendship Is Magic fan convention Canterlot Gardens. His appearance was announced as a motivational seminar on "How to Party like Pinkie Pie", based on one of the show's lead characters, Pinkie Pie. The appearance was featured in Rolling Stone, and was co-hosted by musician and personality Klisk Midori.

In June 2014, Andrew was announced to speak as a guest lecturer at the Oxford Union. W.K.'s keynote, titled Andrew W.K. and The Philosophy of Partying, discussed his signature message of positive power and celebratory self-confidence. Regarding the lecture, Oxford's Nick Fowler said: "In my opinion, Andrew is one of Rock N' Roll's great philosophers." And the Oxford University Rock Society offered their own statement: "We've seen rock stars, we've seen brilliant public speakers, but rarely are they the same person, and rarely do they have as intriguing and broad a background as Andrew W.K."

In September 2014, Andrew gave a lecture on his philosophy of partying at Baltimore School for the Arts as part of The Contemporary museum's speaker series called "CoHosts". In the same month, he also brought his Village Voice advice column, "Ask Andrew W.K.", to life in an intimate setting at New York City nightclub, Santos Party House.

In February 2018, Andrew was named the Person of the Year by the American Association of Suicidology. The AAS stated, "The inaugural Person of the Year Award will be presented to Andrew W.K. due to his consistent and powerful use of positivity to improve the lives of those who hear his music."

=== Written work ===
Andrew wrote a monthly column in FRONT Magazine in the UK.

Andrew also wrote a monthly advice column in the Japanese magazine "Rockin' On", which ran for 10 years – from 2002 until 2012 – and resulted in a book of all the advice columns compiled, called "I Will Change Your Life".

In September 2013, Andrew announced that his first book about partying, "The Party Bible", will be published by Simon & Schuster. The announcement, first broken on The A.V. Club, is accompanied by a video of the "Party Hard" rock icon's physical and mental preparation for the literary task.

In January 2014, The Village Voice announced a new weekly advice column from Andrew called "Ask Andrew W.K." The column appeared in the print edition of the paper, as well as Village Voice online.

On September 28, 2016, Vice Media announced a new weekly column from Andrew W.K. and published his first piece titled "Andrew W.K. on Pressure". The column appeared on the Vice website with Andrew writing about a singular topic each week.

=== Other work ===
Outside of his solo work, Andrew also performed with and produced music for the avant-garde ensemble To Live and Shave in L.A. He first appeared on the band's 2004 release God and Country Rally! He co-produced their 2006 studio album Noon and Eternity, and appears on the group's other 2006 release, the "chronological remix" project Horoscopo: Sanatorio de Molière.

In late 2006, Andrew re-worked his song "Fun Night" into a theme song for the Arizona Sundogs, a hockey team. The song was titled "Sundogs (It Just Got Hotter)". The song "Fun Night" also appeared in the film Old School during one of the party scenes. Andrew was also a judge for the 5th and 10th annual Independent Music Awards to support independent artists' careers.

On July 7, 2007, at 7:07 pm, Andrew appeared as one of the 77 drummers in the 77 Boadrum concert held at the Empire-Fulton Ferry State Park in Brooklyn, New York which was organized by Japanese noise rock group Boredoms. In September 2007 Andrew's piano playing was featured on a jazz fusion CD release "électricité" with Mike Pachelli on guitar, Rich Russo on drums, and Dennis Harding on bass for Los Angeles-based Fullblast Recordings (2007).

Andrew has also performed and recorded electric bass guitar for the artist Baby Dee, whom he met while playing live as the bassist of Current 93. Andrew played bass and drums on Dee's Safe Inside the Day album, and performed with her group at a 2008 show Manhattan. He also produced and mixed Dee's 2011 album, Regifted Light. Andrew has performed bass guitar with Current 93 at the Donau Festival in Krems, Austria in April 2007, the UK All Tomorrow's Parties festival in May 2007, and their European tour in April 2008.

On Friday, December 5, 2008, an Andrew W.K. fan named Dominic Owen Mallary died after an accident while his band Last Lights performed at Boston University. Dominic had always said that he wanted to have Andrew W.K. play during his funeral. After several friends of Dominic emailed him, Andrew came to the wake, and played classical piano for the entire time after paying his respects.

Andrew formed the group The Brill Sisters with guitarist Matt Sweeney and producer Don Fleming. They played their first show (without Fleming) at Santos Party House on April 2, 2009. The entire group performed together on April 21, 2009. Andrew has collaborated with Canada's Nardwuar the Human Serviette and his band The Evaporators to record the split 7-inch A Wild Pear, released in 2009. They worked together again on a pair of tracks for The Evaporators' 2012 album Busy Doing Nothing.

In 2012, it was believed that the United States State Department had named W.K. the US Cultural Ambassador to Bahrain. In reality, he had been merely asked to speak at the Embassy as part of a cultural speakers program, an invitation which, upon further reflection, was repealed "because it did not meet the standards of the State Department." Andrew set a world record for Longest Drum Session in a Retail Store at the MTV Music Awards on Thursday, June 20, 2013, after drumming non-stop for 24 hours. On Thursday, June 12, 2014, Andrew co-hosted the Relentless Kerrang! Awards alongside Scott Ian of Anthrax. The event was held at East London's Troxy.

Andrew also made an appearance as himself in the Cyanide & Happiness show. Most recently, he appeared as a fictional version of himself, "Intern Andrew W.K.", in a live show for Welcome to Night Vale, entitled "The Librarian". Andrew is featured on Nekrogoblikon's album titled Heavy Meta released on June 2, 2015. Andrew appeared on Ken Reid's TV Guidance Counselor podcast on December 11, 2015. Andrew played the role of the character known as "Redeye" in the game Fallout 4 in the Nuka-World DLC.

=== TV and film appearances ===
Andrew has made multiple appearances on MTV, MTV2, and VH1, hosting shows such as The Most Outrageous Frontmen, with Johnny Knoxville and Backstage Pass at the Warped Tour. Andrew was the focus of a televised live performance at Cleveland's Rock 'N' Roll Hall of Fame, broadcast on MTV. He's also made appearances on the shows, I Love The 90's, I Love The New Millennium, Black to the Future, I Love The Holidays, The Great Debate, Best Week Ever and The Osbournes. Andrew was also featured on a popular MTV show called Crashing With Andrew W.K., which documented Andrew's visit to a girl's dorm at North Carolina Central University.

In 2004, Andrew had a television show on MTV2 titled Your Friend, Andrew W.K.. In the series, fans would write letters to Andrew, asking for his help. Andrew would pick certain letters and go to visit them. The series lasted for 11 episodes, each about 9 or 10 minutes in length. During the filming of the show, Andrew was in a car crash but sustained no serious injuries.

Andrew has performed on TV shows such as Late Night with Conan O'Brien, Last Call with Carson Daly, Saturday Night Live, and the Spike TV Video Game Awards. His most recent performance was with Bonnie 'Prince' Billy on Late Night with Conan O'Brien. He had a cameo in the show Aqua Teen Hunger Force, singing "Party Party Party", a song that combines elements of multiple previous Andrew W.K. songs. The song was released on Aqua Teen Hunger Force Colon Movie Film for Theaters the Soundtrack. Andrew's only confirmed movie role is in Punk Rock Holocaust, playing himself.

Andrew was also featured on the finale of the third season of Kathy Griffin: My Life on the D-List as Kathy's date in New York. The two attended one of Andrew's performance art shows. Late Night with Conan O'Brien has twice featured Andrew as a sit-down interview guest—the first in 2003 to speak about the Your Friend, Andrew W.K. show, and then again in 2007, to speak about his motivational performance tours. Andrew was a frequent guest on the Fox News late-night program, Red Eye w/ Greg Gutfeld. Despite this, he claimed to have no party affiliation and just "always wanted to see what was in that building." Andrew has also been a featured interviewer and guest on The Daily Show. In 2011, he appeared in A Day to Remember's video for "All I Want". Andrew also appears on the vocal-instructional DVD The Zen of Screaming.

Cartoon Network also used Andrew W.K. in a music video about the network's new live-action shows. The song and video, "Hearing What I Say" (adapted from Andrew's 2006 song, "Not Going to Bed") aired extensively on Cartoon Network and was available on YouTube. Later the clip was replaced by another bumper. In 2011, Andrew was part of a pyrotechnic stunt with motocross superstar Robbie Maddison performing a backflip on his motorcycle while Andrew presented the event for Cartoon Network's Hall of Game Awards.

Andrew presented Cartoon Network's live-action show Destroy Build Destroy. Andrew had a cameo on Cartoon Network's Mad, in the episode "Kung Fu Blander / Destroy Bob the Builder Destroy", which spoofed both Destroy Build Destroy and Bob the Builder. In 2014, Andrew appeared on Fuse TV's Insane Clown Posse Theater with Insane Clown Posse. Andrew also starred in Lil BUB's Special Special on Animal Planet alongside Lil Bub herself and Amy Sedaris. The TV special premiered on Saturday, February 8.

Andrew's trip to a safari park is the subject of the documentary film, Party Safari (2014), by Nik Box & Chris Hines. In August 2014, Andrew hosted his own show on Kerrang! TV called Andrew W.K.'s Party Hard 100 in which he counted down some of the most party videos on Earth. Andrew also guest co-hosted six episodes of Pivot's TakePart Live alongside Meghan McCain and Jacob Soboroff.

Andrew appeared as a guest on The SDR Show with Ralph Sutton and Big Jay Oakerson. He also made a comeback to Cartoon Network in late March on Pete Browngart's animated series Uncle Grandpa as himself hosting a party alongside Pizza Steve and Mr. Gus in the episode, "Shower Party".

=== Production work ===
In addition to producing his own music on the albums I Get Wet, The Wolf, Close Calls with Brick Walls, and You're Not Alone, Andrew has produced and mixed music for other artists as well as working on special commercial music projects. These include the production of music exclusively for commercial use on television and radio.

In 2008, Andrew gained new notoriety for recording a song called "The McLaughlin Groove", based on an exchange between Pat Buchanan and John McLaughlin on the political television show The McLaughlin Group. The song was commissioned by the Public Radio International show Fair Game, on which Andrew has appeared for interviews.

In 2004, Andrew recorded a television jingle for Kit Kat candy bars, and rewrote their trademark "Give Me a Break" slogan into a new song. The recording appeared in a variety of 30-second, 45-second, and 1 minute commercials, broadcast on television worldwide. "I avoided working with other people for many years, partly out of paranoia, and partly out of an earnest desire to stand on my own. After a while, I got tired of thinking that way, and it just seemed natural to do the opposite of what I had done before. I like making music with other people. I can still make music by myself too."

Andrew's earliest external production work was with the group Wolf Eyes, on their now out-of-print 12-inch EP Fortune Dove. The last track on that album, "What Kind of Band?" features Andrew W.K. on vocals explaining why he enjoys listening to Wolf Eyes. Since then, he's chosen to work on a select and seemingly random set of projects, beginning with production and mixing on the album, Through The Panama, by Brooklyn, NY based three-piece art rock band, Sightings. The album was jointly released by Load Records and Thurston Moore's Ecstatic Peace! label in October 2007.

At the end of 2007, Andrew accepted an invitation to produce a new album, Repentance, for veteran reggae artist Lee "Scratch" Perry. The two had met when Andrew interviewed Perry for DirecTV. Repentance was nominated for "Best Reggae Album" in the 2009 Grammy Awards. On February 20, 2008, Andrew released an exclusive ringtone commissioned by Universal Music Japan for the Japanese mobile phone market. The song is called, "Sonna no Kankei Ne Rock", which celebrates a then popular catch-phrase by a TV Talent, "Sonna no Kankei Ne, Hai Oppappi!" This translates to, "I Don't Give A Damn, Yes Oppappi!" The ringtone was first announced on a Japanese national T.V. program called Music Station and had over 3,500 downloads that day. Cumulative sales of ringtone are over 20,000. Andrew's song debuted at No.1 in Label Mobile's International daily ringtone chart. Label Mobile is the biggest mobile retailer in Japan.

=== Live music venue ===
In the spring of 2008, Andrew and three partners opened a multi-level nightclub and live concert hall in downtown Manhattan, New York City. The venue was named Santos Party House, and featured 8,000 square feet (740 m^{2}) of dance floor and concert facilities, and over 150 loud-speakers. The space was designed for disco dancing and live music. It was one of the few new venues in New York City to be granted a liquor license and a cabaret license. The cabaret license means people can legally dance until 4 am. Santos Party House received numerous awards, including The People's Choice Award for Best Night Club, Best New Club, Best DJ Night (from Paper Magazine), Best New Dance Floor (from The Village Voice), and many more. In May 2009, Wilkes-Krier and his work with Santos was the subject of an extensive four-page article in New York Magazine. In 2010, the Zagat Survey rated Santos Party House the "Top Dance Club" in all of New York City.

Santos Party House's last night of operation was May 29, 2016.

== Legal disputes over name ownership ==
In November 2004, W.K.'s official website was hacked with threats of blackmail from someone who claimed to have co-created Andrew W.K.'s persona, and demanded to be included in the production of the third album, claiming to be "Steev Mike". W.K. responded stating, "Please don't believe Steev Mike. I used to call myself Steev Mike a long time ago and it's nothing now. Someone is trying to confuse you and make me look bad."

In subsequent years, W.K. denied various theories accusing him of being a fake entity, declaring himself to be "a real person who thinks for himself" and "not the victim of anyone or group of people trying to influence my career or life". He clarified that "the nature of how we presented my initial offerings caused some confusion, even though I tried to make it as straightforward as possible... Different people I've worked with and different parts of my back story have gotten twisted and changed. But I made the music on my albums – I had a lot of help from incredible people, but not the kind of help that some people think."

Due to legal disputes regarding the ownership of the name "Andrew W.K.", Close Calls with Brick Walls (2006) was initially only released in Japan and Korea. On August 18, 2007, it was given a limited release in America only on vinyl on Load Records with five exclusive bonus tracks, but only became widely available on CD to the rest of the world in March 2010, bundled with a second disc containing a collection of rare and unreleased songs entitled Mother of Mankind.

In September 2009, writing in the British newspaper, The Guardian, Andrew W.K. acknowledged legal disputes around his name: "At the end of 2004, an old friend of mine got in some business trouble and basically decided to take it out on me. To cut a long story short, this person is someone I worked very closely with and had a formal and family business relationship with. Due to various complaints this person had with me, they were able to turn my life and career upside down. I wasn't allowed to use my own name within certain areas of the US entertainment industry and we were in a debate about who owned the rights to my image, and who should get credit for 'inventing' it. This made my life complicated and intense for a few years, but I kept working and doing whatever I could to keep moving forward."

== Artistry ==
Andrew W.K.'s work has featured occult symbolism and addressed themes associated with Thelema, such as personal transformation, freedom and following one's own True Will. Additionally, his work has regularly explored concepts of authenticity, duality and the relationship between confusion and clarity.

== Physical appearance ==
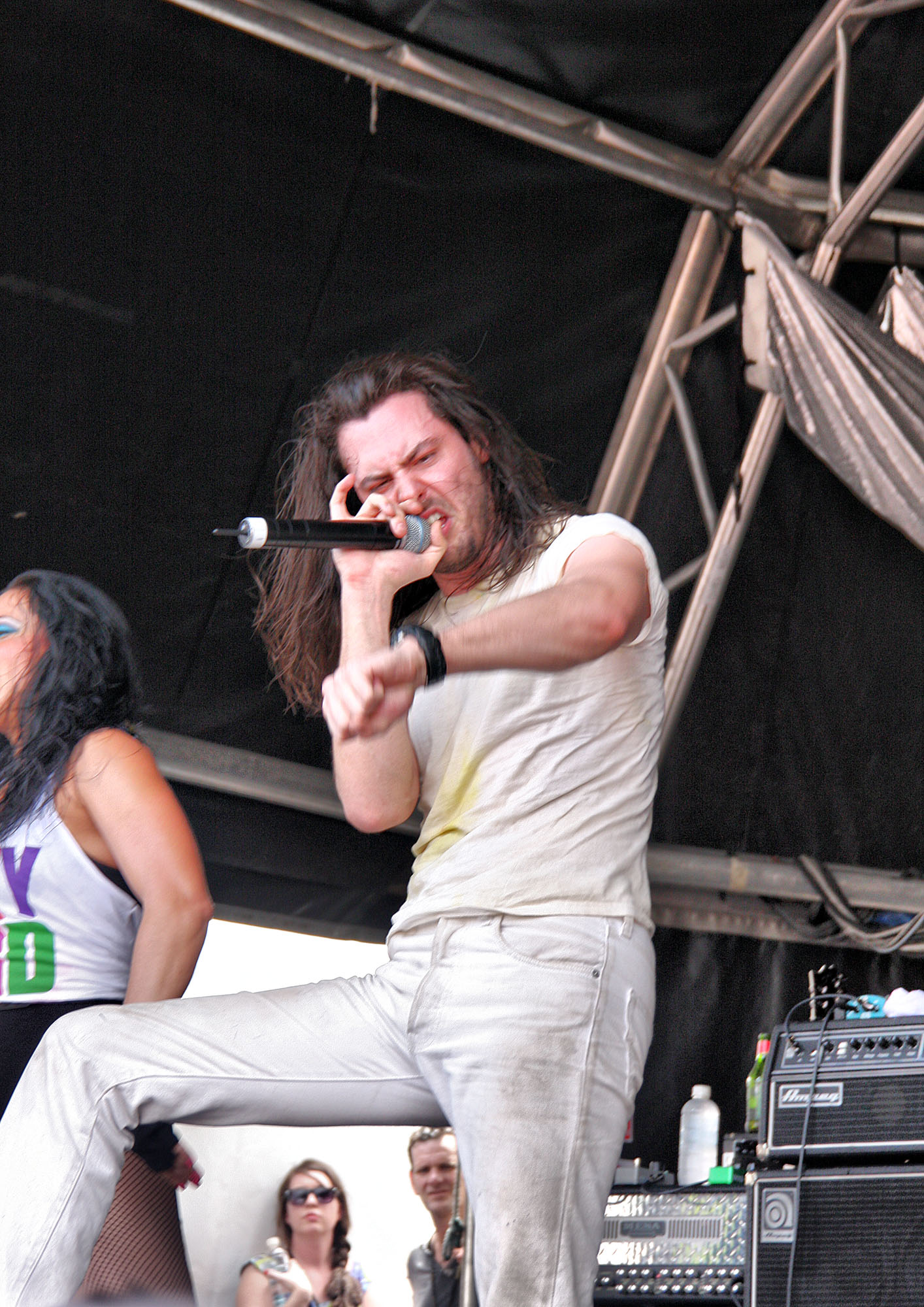
W.K. in 2011 wearing his usual concert outfit

W.K. is known for his long hair and wearing a usually dirty all white outfit, consisting of a white t-shirt, white jeans, black digital watch and sneakers. The album artwork for I Get Wet featured a photo of Andrew with a bloody nose; this image is used frequently in his merchandise and persona. W.K. has six tattoos, all of which are straight lines on his arms. In 2011, Kesha gave Andrew a line tattoo with a pen and a safety pin that resulted in an infection.

W.K.'s physical appearance has subtly fluctuated over time leading to persistent fan theories that multiple people may have played the "Andrew W.K." character.

== Personal life ==
Andrew W.K. previously lived in Midtown Manhattan but left in 2006 or 2007, "bouncing between short-term situations" in other locations outside New York. He married Cherie Lily on October 4, 2008, in a traditional Persian wedding ceremony. Lily performed with W.K.'s band as a vocalist and hypewoman from 2006 until 2018. W.K. has two children but keeps them out of the public eye. W.K. has a younger brother, Patrick Wilkes-Krier, who is a professional golfer.

In May 2021, W.K. announced via a press release that he and his former wife Cherie had begun amicable divorce proceedings in late 2019. He also confirmed that he was dating actress Kat Dennings, after the two met in Los Angeles in early 2021. A week later, on May 13, 2021, the couple announced their engagement on Instagram. They married on November 27, 2023, at their Los Angeles home.

== Live band members ==
=== Current ===
- Erik Payne – guitars, backing vocals (1999–present)
- Gregg Roberts – bass, backing vocals (1999–present)
- Dave Pino – guitars, backing vocals (2012–present)
- Amanda Lepre – guitars, backing vocals (2016–present)
- Clark Kegley – drums (2016–present)

=== Former ===
- Donald Tardy – drums (1998–2003)
- Frank Werner – guitars, backing vocals (1999–2013)
- Jimmy Coup – guitars, backing vocals (1999–2004)
- Jeff Victor – keyboards (2001–2002)
- Rich Russo – drums (2003–2016)
- Kenny Andrews – guitars, backing vocals (2003–2011)
- Johnny "Beans" Sutton (2004–2005)
- Derek Weiland – keyboards (2006–2007)
- Cherie Lily – vocals (2006–2018)
- Justin Payne – guitars (2008–2013)
- Blake Canaris – bass, backing vocals (2010–2016)
- Erica E.T. Pino – keyboards, backing vocals (2018–2019)
- German Cervantes - guitars, backing vocals (2003)

== Discography ==
=== Studio albums ===
- I Get Wet (2001)
- The Wolf (2003)
- Close Calls With Brick Walls (2006 Japan, 2010 Worldwide)
- 55 Cadillac (2009)
- You're Not Alone (2018)
- God Is Partying (2021)
- Temptation to Exist (2026)

== Filmography ==
=== Films ===
Year	Title	Role	Notes
2002	Jackass: The Movie		Soundtrack
2012	I Spill Your Guts	Crazy Hobo	—N/a
2013	Cool as Hell	Andrew	—N/a
2015	Dude Bro Party Massacre III	Rip Stick	—N/a
2016	Midnight Show	Theater voice	—N/a
2017	(Romance) in the Digital Age	Himself	—N/a
2020	Your Friend Andrew W.K.	Himself	Documentary

=== Television ===
Year	Title	Role	Notes
2002	Jackass Backyard BBQ	Himself	TV special
2004	Your Friend, Andrew WK	Himself	Host
2006	Aqua Teen Hunger Force	Himself	Episode: "Party All the Time", voice role
2006	I Love the New Millennium	Himself	Commentator, 8 episodes
2010	Food Party	Santa	Episode: "Zit Butter"
2011	Destroy Build Destroy	Himself	Host, all episodes
2011	Mad	Himself	Episode: "Kung Fu Blander/Destroy, Bob the Builder, Destroy", voice role
2012	Let's Big Happy	Himself	Episodes: "Pilot" and "Andrew W.K."
2014	Meet Me at the Reck	Himself	YouTube series, all episodes
2014	The Eric Andre Show	Himself	Episode: "Pauly D; Rick Springfield", special guest
2015	Uncle Grandpa	Himself	Episode: "Shower Party", voice role
2016	Idiotsitter	Kerry	Episode: "GED Prom"
2021	American Dad!	Palmer	Voice; Episode: "The Wondercabinet"

=== Video games ===
Year	Title	Role	Notes
2003	Madden NFL 2003	Soundtrack artist	Madden NFL 2003 Soundtrack, Party Hard
2003	NASCAR Thunder 2004	Soundtrack artist	NASCAR Thunder 2004, Tear it Up
2004	Backyard Wrestling 2: There Goes the Neighborhood	Himself	
2009	Pro Evolution Soccer 2010	Soundtrack artist	Pro Evolution Soccer 2010 Soundtrack, Party Hard
2016	Fallout 4: Nuka-World	RedEye	DLC
