= Your Friend, Andrew WK =

American television series

- Presented by: Andrew W.K.
- No. of seasons: 1
- No. of episodes: 9

Production
- Running time: 10 minutes

Original release
- Network: MTV2
- Release: May 22 – July 17, 2004

Your Friend, Andrew WK was a reality show on MTV2 starring musician Andrew W.K.

== Format ==
In the show, messages would be sent to Andrew W.K. from a page on MTV's website. One message per show would have W.K. travel to the sender's location and help them personally. Other messages would be read during the show.

== Release ==
The show would air on Saturday, starting May 22, and continuing until July 17th, adding up to nine total episodes. The show has never been officially released by MTV or W.K.
