= Sherry Vine =

American actor, drag queen and comedian

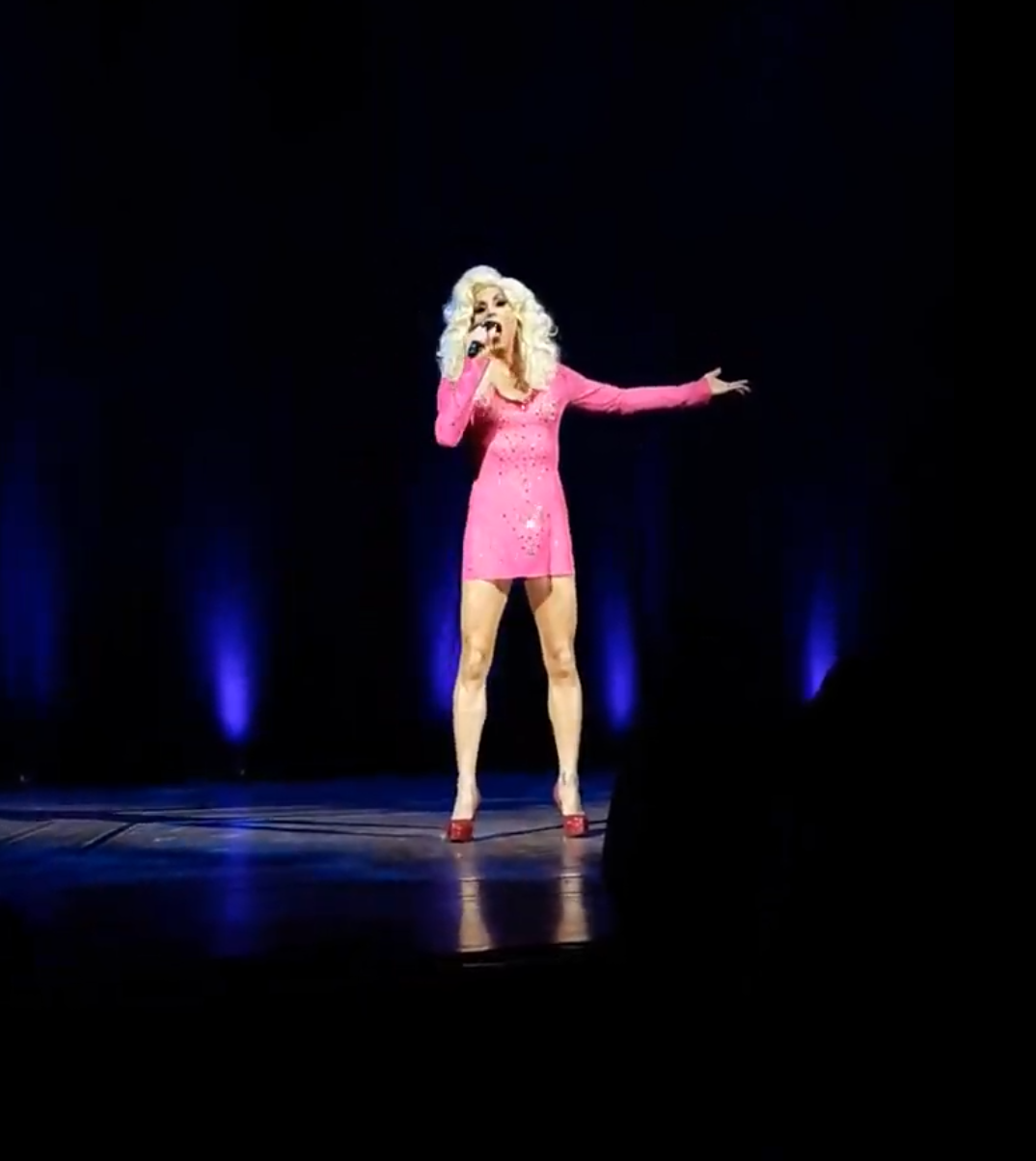
- Vine on stage in 2019
- Born: Keith Levy; Florida, U.S.
- Occupations: Actor, drag queen, musician
- Years active: 1992–present
- Website: sherryvine.com

Keith Levy, known professionally as Sherry Vine, is an American actor, drag queen, and musician. Vine is the creator and host of She's Living for This, a variety series on Here TV.

Vine works primarily in New York City and on Fire Island, Long Island, but has also performed across the United States and Europe. She is known for her parodies of popular songs.

== Early life and career ==
Vine was born Keith Levy in Florida, but grew up in Columbia, Maryland. Vine studied at University of Maryland then transferred to USC. Levy moved to New York City in 1990, and in 1992, he started drag as Sherry Vine. His first time in drag was for a one-act play in Los Angeles, called Sorry, Wrong Number. in 1991, Vine was living with actress and drag artist Candis Cayne.

Vine is a fixture in the New York City drag circuit. In the 1990s, he often performed in Theater Couture shows in the East Village with Jackie Beat and Mario Diaz. Theatre Couture was founded by Vine, Joe Gross, and Douglass Sanders in 1992. Vine also performed at Bar d'O, a lounge in the West Village, in weekly shows with Joey Arias, Raven O and Sade Pendarvis.

In 2010, Vine was featured in the web series Queens of Drag: NYC by gay.com. The series featured fellow New York drag queens Bianca Del Rio, Dallas DuBois, Hedda Lettuce, Lady Bunny, Mimi Imfurst, and Peppermint.

== Songs ==
Vine performs a wide variety of parodies. She has parodied Madonna, Britney Spears, Rihanna, Adele, and Lady Gaga, including the songs "Poker Face" and "Paparazzi". Vine has filmed videos of many of her parodies.

== Filmography ==
=== Film ===
Year	Title	Role	Notes
1995	Stonewall	Diva	
1996	Scream, Teen, Scream	Nurse Nacy DePalma	Short film
1998	Shucking the Curve	Nick/Nicki	
1998	Downtown Darlings	Himself	Documentary
1998	The Electric Urn	Katona	
1999	Charlie!		
1999	The Trouble with Perpetual Deja-Vu	TV Hostess	
2000	Teach Yourself How to Become a Drag Queen 101	Himself	
2004	The Raspberry Reich	Drag Queen Stage	
2005	Gender X	Himself	Documentary
2006	Charmed Life	Himself	Documentary
2006	Pimp & Ho: Sissy Sins	Jenny Tulls	Short film
2007	Fucking Different New York	Angelina	
2010	Florent: Queen of the Meat Market	Himself	Documentary
2011	House of Shame: Chantal All Night Long	Himself	Documentary
2011	A Fairy Tale	Rose	Short film
2011	Bar d'O	Himself	Documentary
2011	Children of the Dune	Himself	Short film
2012	The Internet Demarginalizes Drag Artists	Himself	Documentary short
2012	Party Like a Pornstar	Himself	Short film
2012	Welcome to New York	Dr. Kitty Rosenblatt	Short film
2013	Fire Island '79		Short film

=== Television ===
Year	Title	Role	Notes
1993	RuPaul's Christmas Ball	Himself	TV special
2006	House of Venus Show	Himself	Season 2, Episode 2
2008	Project Runway	Himself	Season 5, Episode 6: "Good Queen Fun"
2011	Just Josh	Himself	Season 1, Episode 2 Season 1, Episode 4
2012–13	She's Living for This	Himself	Creator and host
2012	The Deal	Himself	Season 2, Episode 3
2013	Totally Biased with W. Kamau Bell	Himself	Season 1, Episode 15: "The Spirit of Stonewall"
2020	Station 19	Rainbow Trout	Episode: "We Are Family"
2021–present	The Sherry Vine Show	Himself	Host
2021	The Browns	Himself	Guest appearance

=== Web series ===
Year	Title	Role	Notes
2010	Queens of Drag: NYC	Himself	Produced by gay.com
2019	Anything You Can Do	Himself	Guest
2024	Very Delta	Himself	Guest

=== Music videos ===
Year	Title	Artist	Role	Ref(s)
2020	"Nerves of Steel"	Erasure	Cameo	

== Theatre ==
Year	Title	Role	Theatre
2000	Doll	Nora	Performance Space 122
2006	Carrie	Carrie White	Performance Space 122

== See also ==
- LGBT culture in New York City
- List of LGBT people from New York City
- NYC Pride March
