= Just Josh =

- Created by: Josh Rosenzweig; Eric Feldman
- Starring: Josh Rosenzweig
- Country of origin: United States
- Original language: English
- No. of seasons: 2
- No. of episodes: 20

Production
- Executive producers: Paul Colichman; Stephen P. Jarchow
- Running time: 30 minutes
- Production company: Here Media

Original release
- Network: here!
- Release: January 28, 2011 – August 29, 2022

Just Josh is an American talk show hosted by television personality, writer, and director Josh Rosenzweig. Filmed on location throughout New York City, Rosenzweig conducts celebrity interviews, visits premiere VIP events, and discusses all things pop culture. The show premiered on LGBT-targeted network here! on January 28, 2011.

here! produced 19 episodes for season one, and has begun production on the show's second season.

In 2012 it was announced that episodes of Just Josh will be made available on online video service Hulu.

== Premise ==
In each Just Josh episode, host Josh Rosenzweig visits a popular New York City destination. He has been seen taking fencing lessons, country line dancing, and takes an aerobics class with Cherie Lily.

The show then returns to the studio where Rosenzweig interviews guests of particular interest to here!'s LGB audience. Guests to date have included Molly Shannon, Isabella Rossellini, Duran Duran, Judith Light and Tabatha Coffey.

== Episodes ==
=== Season 1 ===
Episode 1:

Josh interviews Johnny Rozsa, Charles Busch, and goes behind the scenes at Alias restaurant in New York City.

Episode 2:

The second episode includes interviews with 80's pop duo, Duran Duran and musician Ari Gold.

Episode 3:

Josh interviews Tabatha Coffey from Bravo's Tabatha Takes Over, visits with Bob Pontarelli of Industry, and spotlights Tom Viola of Broadway Cares/Equity Fights AIDS.

Episode 4:

Josh visits the set of Promises, Promises and interviews Molly Shannon, talks to singing sensation Sylvia Tosun and takes in a performance at Bar D'O starring Joey Arias and Sherry Vine.

Episode 5:

Josh interviews Isabella Rossellini, Crayton Robey and gives two-stepping a shot at the Valentine's Day Pajama Event at Big Apple Ranch.

Episode 6:

Josh learns the art of graffiti from NYC's Dick Chicken, interviews Casey Spooner, and works out with Cherie Lily at Crunch Fitness.

Episode 7:

Josh talks to Charo, gives fencing a stab with U.S. Olympic silver medalist Tim Morehouse and learns the art of meatballs on the Lower East Side

Episode 8:

Josh travels to Palm Springs during the largest lesbian event in the world - The Dinah, where he talks to The Dinah organizer, Mariah Hanson.

== Cast ==
=== Main cast ===
- Josh Rosenzweig is the show's host.

=== Guests ===
- Johnny Rozsa
- Charles Busch
- Duran Duran
- Ari Gold
- Tabatha Coffey
- Molly Shannon
- Isabella Rossellini
- Casey Spooner
- Charo
- Tim Morehouse
- Mariah Hanson
- Candace Bushnell
- Judith Light
- Leslie Jordan
- Cazwell
- Terrence McNally
- Daniela Brooker
