= The Japan Covers =

Studio album by Andrew W.K.
- Released: November 26, 2008 (Japan)
- Recorded: 2008
- Genre: Rock
- Label: Universal Music Group
- Producer: Andrew W.K.

Andrew W.K. chronology
Close Calls With Brick Walls (2006)	The Japan Covers (2008)	A Wild Pear (2009)

Premium Collection: The Japan Covers, known as Ippatsu Shōbu: Covers (一発勝負～カヴァーズ, Ippatsu Shōbu~Kavāzu; lit. "One-Shot Game: Covers") in Japan, is a cover album by Andrew W.K. The album, consisting of covers of various J-pop songs, was released in Japan by Universal Music Group on November 26, 2008.

The songs were originally marketed as 30-second ringtones and repackaged in their complete versions as this 14-song album. Andrew W.K. is quoted as saying that this album is a "gift to the Japanese people, for all the incredible warmth and kindness they've given me over the years."

== Tracks ==
1. "KISEKI" (originally GReeeeN's "Kiseki" [キセキ])
2. "GIROPPON" (originally Nezumi Senpai's "Roppongi ~Giroppon~" [六本木～GIROPPON～])
3. "Shuchishin" (羞恥心, Shūchishin; originally by Shuchishin)
4. "Linda Linda" (originally THE BLUE HEARTS' "Linda Linda" [リンダ リンダ])
5. "Little Love Song" (小さな恋のうた, Chiisana Koi no Uta; originally by MONGOL800)
6. "Gakuen Tengoku" (学園天国; originally by Finger 5)
7. "Runner" (originally by BAKUFU-SLUMP)
8. "Monica" (モニカ, Monika; originally by Koji Kikkawa)
9. "Bohemian" (ボヘミアン; originally by Yuki Katsuragi)
10. "Love Is Over" (ラヴ・イズ・オーヴァー, Ravu Izu Ōvā; originally by OuYang FeiFei)
11. "MY FIRST KISS" (originally covered by Hi-STANDARD)
12. "Ai Senshi" (哀 戦士; originally by Daisuke Inoue)
13. "Shima Uta" (島唄; originally by THE BOOM)
14. "Thrill" (スリル, Suriru; originally by Tomoyasu Hotei)
