= A Wild Pear =

EP by the Evaporators and Andrew W.K.
- Released: 23 June 2009
- Length: 8:38
- Label: Mint Records

Andrew W.K. chronology
The Japan Covers (2008)	A Wild Pear (2009)	55 Cadillac (2009)

"A Wild Pear" is a split EP from the Canadian garage rock band the Evaporators and American rock artist Andrew W.K. It was released on June 23, 2009, and features one original song and one cover by The Evaporators on side 1 and two covers by Andrew W.K. and an interview by Nardwuar the Human Serviette (lead singer and keyboardist of The Evaporators) with Andrew W.K. on side 2. The EP features cover art by cartoonist Mitch Clem.

The album title and cover art are a parody of the album "A Wild Pair", a promotional album released in 1968 by Coca-Cola and featuring The Guess Who and The Staccotos.

== Track listing ==
=== Side Nard (side 1) ===
1. "The Bomb's In My Pants!" – 1:34
2. "Oh Non" – 2:33 (Les Hou-Lops cover)

=== Side WK (side 2) ===
1. "Oh Canaduh" – 2:22 (The Subhumans cover)
2. "Nardwuar vs. Andrew W.K." – 1:02 (Interview)
3. "Don't Sell Hot Dogs Tonight" – 0:52 (Leather Uppers cover)

== Personnel ==
The Evaporators

- David Carswell – guitar, vocals
- Hamm – bass, organ
- Nardwuar – vocals, organ
- Shawn Mrazek – drums

with:

- Megan Barnes – additional vocals on "Oh Non"

Andrew W.K.

- Performed by Andrew W.K., except additional guitar by F. Vierti on "Don't Sell Hot Dogs Tonight""
