= Gundam Rock =

Studio album by Andrew W.K.
- Released: September 9, 2009 (Japan)
- Genre: Pop/Rock
- Length: 40:46
- Label: Universal Music Japan
- Producer: Andrew W.K.

Andrew W.K. chronology
55 Cadillac (2009)	Gundam Rock (2009)	The "Party All Goddamn Night" EP (2011)

Gundam 30th anniversary chronology
Gundam 30th Custom (2009)	Gundam Rock (2009)	2009 Tobe! Gundam/Eien ni Amuro (2009)

Gundam Rock is a cover album by Andrew W.K., released on September 9, 2009, exclusively in Japan. The album consists of covered music from the Gundam series to celebrate its 30th anniversary.

The front cover artwork features an original illustration by respected Gundam and Capcom artist, Akira Yasuda (also known as "Akiman"). The image depicts Andrew W.K. floating in space next to the RX-78-2 Gundam in similar fashion to Amuro Ray in the poster of the Char's Counterattack movie.

== Track listing ==
No.	Title	Length
1.	"TV Series Opening Narration (TVシリーズ [オープニング・ナレーション])" (TV Shirīzu [Ōpuningu Narēshon])	1:00
2.	"Gundam on the Earth (ガンダム大地に立つ)" (Gandamu Daichi ni Tatsu)	0:36
3.	"Fly, Gundam (翔べ！ガンダム)" (Tobe! Gandamu)	2:45
4.	"Char the Great (颯爽たるシャア)" (Sassōtaru Shaa)	2:17
5.	"Here Comes Char (シャアが来る)" (Shaa ga Kuru)	3:00
6.	"Star Children (スターチルドレン)" (Sutā Chirudoren)	4:18
7.	"The Cross of Sand (砂の十字架)" (Suna no Jūjika)	4:53
8.	"Eye Catch (アイキャッチ)" (Ai Kyatchi)	0:10
9.	"Soldiers of Sorrow (哀 戦士)" (Ai Senshi)	3:48
10.	"Peace for a Moment (ひとときの安らぎ)" (Hitotoki no Yasuragi)	0:21
11.	"Alone in the Wind (風にひとりで)" (Kaze ni Hitori de)	3:26
12.	"Beginning (ビギニング)" (Biginingu)	3:30
13.	"Fear to Fight (戦いへの恐怖)" (Tatakai e no Kyōfu)	1:06
14.	"Encounter (めぐりあい)" (Meguriai)	4:23
15.	"Amuro Forever (永遠にアムロ)" (Eien ni Amuro)	3:06
16.	"Garma Zabi's Funeral Speech by Gihren Zabi (ギレン・ザビ [ガルマ・ザビ追悼演説])" (Giren Zabi [Garuma Zabi Tsuitō Enzetsu])	2:07
