= To Live and Shave in L.A. =

US musical group

To Live and Shave in L.A. (TLASILA)
- Origin: Miami Beach, Florida, U.S.
- Genres: Experimental rock; avant-rock; avant-metal; noise metal; harsh noise; free improvisation; musique concrète; abstract
- Years active: 1993–2022
- Labels: Menlo Park Recordings, Savage Land, Blossoming Noise, Karl Schmidt Verlag
- Members: Frank Falestra; Ben Wolcott; Weasel Walter; Thurston Moore; Nondor Nevai; Mark Morgan; Don Fleming; Chris Grier; Andrew W.K. Graham Moore; Andrew Barranca; Liz Armstrong; Balazs Pandi; Joke Lanz; Mark Shellhaas; Patrick Spurlock; Matt Mitchell; Greg Chapman
- Past members: Tom Smith (deceased); The Lady Tigra; Oscar Perez
- Website: http://www.toliveandshaveinla.com

To Live and Shave in L.A. (TLASILA) is an experimental noise rock collective founded in 1993 by avant-garde composer/producer Tom Smith (formerly of Washington, DC groups Peach of Immortality and Pussy Galore) and Miami Beach musician/producer Frank "Rat Bastard" Falestra. They were soon joined by oscillator player Ben Wolcott. This lineup created the majority of the early releases in TLASILA's extensive discography.

The group's debut album, 30-minuten männercreme, was released in 1994. Bananafish Magazine described the recording as "a wind tunnel of 30-weight vitriol." The "wildly inaccessible" ensemble has featured Don Fleming, Andrew W.K., Weasel Walter, Thurston Moore, and at least a dozen other musicians and sound artists.

The group's primary aesthetic assertion posits that "genre is obsolete". Although often categorized as purveyors of noise rock, TLASILA have been noted to pursue an unorthodox approach, "construct(ing) songs around an overwhelming plethora of sonic detail, challenging the listener to engage with a surfeit of information," deliberately blurring "the line between harsh metal-on-metal noise and abstract musique concrète" Smith's lyrics "distance" the group "from any potential peers," "scanning like (they) came from some previously unearthed hermetic treatise."

Following the release of The Cortège (Fan Death Records, 2011), the collective went on hiatus, abjuring live performances but releasing albums all the while. Regrouping in January 2015 with the album Unwept to Meet Strange Clay (Karl Schmidt Verlag, 2015), TLASILA resumed its touring activities.

Founding member Tom Smith died in January 2022. In 2025, Palilalia released a 25th anniversary deluxe four LP box set reissue of The Wigmaker in Eighteenth-Century Williamsburg.

== Selected discography ==
- 30-minuten männercreme CD (Love Is Sharing Pharmaceuticals, 1994)
- Vedder Vedder Bedwetter CD (Fifth Colvmn Records, 1995)
- An Interview with the Mitchell Brothers CD (Audible Hiss, 1995)
- Tonal Harmony CD (Betley Welcomes Careful Drivers, 1997)
- Where a Horse Has Been Standing and Where You Belong CD (Western Blot, 1998)
- Peter Criss vs. Peter Christopherson CD-R (Betley Welcomes Careful Drivers, 2000)
- The Wigmaker in Eighteenth Century Williamsburg 2xCD (Menlo Park Recordings, 2002)
- God and Country Rally! CD (The Smack Shire, 2004)
- Horóscopo: Sanatorio de Molière CD (Blossoming Noise, 2006)
- Noon and Eternity CD (Menlo Park Recordings, 2006)
- Les Tricoteuses CD (Savage Land Records, 2007)
- Like Other Painters of Her Generation... Split LP (with Totally Ripped) (Isolated Now Waves, 2008)
- Le Ceneri di.../Sun Hidden There Split CD-3 (with Harshcore) (Dukuro, 2008)
- Les poisons délectables C-40 (Tanzprocesz, 2009)
- The Cortège 12" LP (Fan Death Records, 2011)
- The Cortège CD (Thick Syrup Records, 2011)
- Chorea Vinyl 2xCD (Karl Schmidt Verlag, 2012)
- The Death 6xCD (Karl Schmidt Verlag, 2013)
- The Tall Ma'rib with Coalition Skin CD (Karl Schmidt Verlag, 2014)
- Unwept to Meet Strange Clay CD (Karl Schmidt Verlag, 2015)
- Apfel - Messer - Fliege CD (Barn & Associates, 2015)
- The Propagation of Negation Volumes 1 & 2 CD (Karl Schmidt Verlag, 2017)
- Deluxe reissue of The Wigmaker in Eighteenth-Century Williamsburg 4 LP box set (Palilalia, 2025)
