= I Get Wet =

Studio album by Andrew W.K.
- Released: November 13, 2001
- Recorded: 2000–2001
- Studios: Heaven Studios (New York City, NY); Guardian Sound (Los Angeles, CA); The Chop Shop (Los Angeles, CA); Ocean Way/Record One (Los Angeles, CA); New Jersey Studios (Minneapolis, MN); White Rose Studios (Michigan); Maroon Bell Studios (Aspen, CO)
- Genres: Hard rock; pop metal; heavy metal; punk rock
- Length: 35:32
- Label: Island
- Producers: Andrew W.K.; John Fields; Scott Humphrey; TSD; Frank Vierti

Andrew W.K. chronology
Party Til You Puke (2000)	I Get Wet (2001)	The Wolf (2003)

Singles from I Get Wet
- 1. "Party Hard" Released: October 29, 2001; 2. "She Is Beautiful" Released: February 19, 2002; 3. "We Want Fun" Released: December 2002; 4. "Fun Night" Released: 2003

I Get Wet is the debut studio album by American rock musician Andrew W.K., released on November 13, 2001, via Island Records. Its first two singles were "Party Hard" and "She Is Beautiful".

== Recording ==
=== Production ===
I Get Wet was recorded while Andrew W.K. was living in New York City. The album was recorded with many layers of overdubbing, in order to make the album "sound as party as we could make it sound," and for the "sound of the songs to be like one instrument" instead of a collection of individual musicians. In July 2001, W.K. and Jimmy Coup traveled to Minneapolis, Minnesota to record with John Fields at SubJersey Studio. In August, the three traveled to Sherman Oaks, California to mix the record with Mike Shipley at Record One.

=== Influences ===
One inspiration for the album was Andrew W.K.'s enjoyment of intense, major-key music, something he attributed to his musical childhood experiences with the piano.

Another inspiration for I Get Wet was the charity single "We Are the World" by USA for Africa. Andrew W.K. was impressed with how all the artists on the song were singing all at once, something he described as a "powerful sound, like an orchestra." In turn, Andrew W.K. wanted to create music that sounded like that.

=== Artwork ===
I Get Wet is known for its cover art shot by art photographer Roe Ethridge: a photo of a wet-haired Andrew W.K. with a large stream of blood running from his nose, down his chin and onto his throat. This cover art caused a controversy, as it was seen to represent cocaine abuse and violence. To achieve the effect, W.K. initially said that he struck himself in the face with a piece of a cinder block during the photo shoot but later explained that it did not lead to enough blood flow. Consequently, he supplemented his own blood with some of an animal which he got from a butcher's shop.

== Release history ==
The album went to number one on Billboard's Top Heatseekers chart. The songs "Party Hard" and "She Is Beautiful" were released as singles. The opening track, "It's Time to Party", was featured in an advertisement for Hotwire.com, a Coors spot and an Expedia ad. "Fun Night" can be heard in the 2003 film Old School. The track, "Don't Stop Living in the Red" was featured in an ad for Target. "I Love NYC" is frequently played at New York Rangers games. "Ready to Die" is used in the Hitman game series, as well as the trailer for the game Rage 2.

On August 28, 2012, a deluxe reissue of I Get Wet was released. The reissue contained previously unheard recordings, demos, live tracks, and alternate mixes. A limited number of autographed deluxe editions contained a lock of Andrew's hair, a piece of his white jeans, or an autographed plane ticket from his 2012 world tour.

== Critical reception ==
Professional ratings
Aggregate scores
Source	Rating
Metacritic	64/100
Review scores
Source	Rating
AllMusic	5/5 stars
Alternative Press	8/10
Blender	3/5 stars
Entertainment Weekly	B+
The Guardian	3/5 stars
NME	8/10
Pitchfork	0.6/10 (2002); 8.6/10 (2012)
Q	4/5 stars
Rolling Stone	4/5 stars
The Village Voice	A−

I Get Wet provoked very polarizing critical reaction when it was initially released, with Pitchfork's Ian Cohen retrospectively writing that "critics of Andrew W.K. were often branded as the fun police and his fans considered fools or incurable ironists." On the review aggregate site Metacritic, the album holds a score of 64 out of 100, indicating "generally favorable reviews". Stephen Thompson of The A.V. Club described I Get Wet as "more fabulously entertaining the louder it's played" and added that "if it wipes out a generation of hard-rock crybabies along the way, fans will owe him a debt of gratitude that can never be repaid." Rob Sheffield of Rolling Stone also gave the album a positive review, stating that "there's no denying the over-the-top whomp of his music, the loudest and funniest metal you've heard in ages." David Browne, writing in Entertainment Weekly, noted that W.K. "must know how ridiculous this all sounds, but he attacks the material with such fervor that you almost believe he means every word." AllMusic's Heather Phares noted that while the album "has a certain sameness due to the frenetic beat that drives nearly every track, it's the perfect complement to W.K.'s party-centric vision", praising it as "refreshingly simple and cleverly stupid."

Adrien Begrand of PopMatters gave the album a mixed review, writing "At its best, WK’s music is a refreshing blast of skanky air on the current stale music scene, but at its worst, it’s disappointingly monotonous, unoriginal, and very, very dumb." Evan Chakroff of Stylus Magazine called it a "worthless piece of rock-product, 35 minutes of glossy, overproduced tripe", but concluded that "once these songs have pounded their way into your head, you can’t help but pay attention" and "if this is a joke, it's a brilliant one." Ryan Schreiber of Pitchfork panned the album as being "about as empty as rock music gets, right down to the tinny, digitally processed tonebank noise that passes for 'guitars.'"

=== Legacy ===
Q listed I Get Wet as one of the best 50 albums of 2001. NME included I Get Wet in their retrospective list of the best albums of 2001. Rhapsody ranked the album at number two on its "Rock's Best Albums of the Decade" list. Despite initially panning the album, Pitchfork placed I Get Wet at number 144 on their list of top 200 albums of the 2000s. Ian Cohen of Pitchfork acknowledged his review of the album's 2012 reissue, which received a "Best New Reissue" designation, as the website's "biggest statistical mea culpa ever", writing that "whether you consider these songs to be brilliant, brilliantly dumb, or just dumb, I Get Wet is necessarily simple".

Andrew W.K. reflected on the album's initial reaction in a 2012 interview, saying:

Everything is always going through changes in terms of attitudes or mood, but it does seem like partying is a more common theme in music and culture [now]; colorful attitudes and excitement and positivity are more embraced. I remember trying to make a band the first time around [..] people didn't like that there were keyboards in the music. They said it sounded too corporate. They also didn't like that it had this four-on-the-floor club beat. But it's interesting because now the club/dance beat is in lots and lots of songs. I was very happy with how things have come around.

== Track listing ==
All songs composed and written by Andrew W.K.

No.	Title	Length
1.	"It's Time to Party"	1:30
2.	"Party Hard"	3:04
3.	"Girls Own Love"	3:13
4.	"Ready to Die"	2:54
5.	"Take It Off"	3:10
6.	"I Love NYC"	3:11
7.	"She Is Beautiful"	3:33
8.	"Party til You Puke"	2:34
9.	"Fun Night"	3:23
10.	"Got to Do It"	3:55
11.	"I Get Wet"	3:23
12.	"Don't Stop Living in the Red"	1:42

Japanese edition bonus tracks
No.	Title	Length
13.	"We Want Fun"	4:21
14.	"Make Sex"	0:46

10th anniversary edition bonus disc

1. "It's Time to Party (Live)" 2:09
2. "It's Time to Party (1999 Version)" 1:24
3. "Party Hard (Live)" 4:33
4. "Party Hard (1999 Version)" 3:07
5. "Girls Own Love (Live)" 3:46
6. "Girls Own Love (1999 Version)" 3:35
7. "Ready to Die (Live)" 3:19
8. "Take It Off (Live)" 3:23
9. "I Love NYC (Live)" 3:51
10. "She Is Beautiful (Live)" 5:15
11. "She Is Beautiful (1999 Version)" 3:13
12. "Party til You Puke (Live)" 2:53
13. "It Just Got Hotter (Sundogs Version)" 3:26
14. "Got to Do It (Keyboards Version)" 4:12
15. "I Get Wet (Live)" 5:13
16. "Don't Stop Living in the Red (1999 Version)" 1:33

== Personnel ==
Credits adapted from the album's liner notes.

Primary musicians

- Andrew W.K. – vocals, composition, synthesizer, bass guitar, production
- Jimmy Coup – guitar, vocals (sweet heat)
- Erik Payne – guitar
- Donald Tardy – drums
- Gregg Roberts – bass guitar
- Frank Werner – guitar

Additional musicians

- Tony Allen - additional guitar, assistant engineering
- Phil X – additional guitar
- Chuck Morgan – additional guitar
- F. Thomas – additional guitar
- Chris Chaney - additional bass guitar
- Mike David – additional bass guitar
- Gary Novak - additional drums
- Brett Lee - additional drums
- Tom Gordon – effects processing
- Lou Willis - effects processing
- Frank Vierti – piano, keyboards, production
- Roger Lian – digital editing, programming
- Cory Churko – digital editing, programming
- Anthony Miller – programming
- Darron D. – programming
- Nate Young – programming

Production personnel

- Dan Burns – assistant engineering
- Jeff Burns – engineering
- Roe Ethridge – photography
- John Fields – production, engineering
- Frank Gryner – engineering
- Scott Humphrey – production
- Mike Shipley – mixing
- Robert C. Thompson – engineering
- Dave Collins – mastering
- TSD – production
- Bobby Warner – engineering
- K. Williams – art direction

== Charts ==
=== Weekly charts ===
Weekly chart performance for I Get Wet
Chart (2001-02)	Peak position
Finnish Albums (Suomen virallinen lista)	32
Scottish Albums (Official Charts)	69
Swedish Albums (Sverigetopplistan)	59
UK Albums (Official Charts)	71
UK Rock & Metal Albums (Official Charts)	5
US Billboard 200	84
US Heatseekers Albums (Billboard)	1

2019 weekly chart performance
Chart (2019)	Peak position
US Indie Store Album Sales (Billboard)	10

=== Year-end charts ===
2002 year-end chart performance for I Get Wet
Chart (2002)	Position
Canadian Alternative Albums (Nielsen SoundScan)	136
Canadian Metal Albums (Nielsen SoundScan)	68

== Certifications ==
Certifications for I Get Wet
Region	Certification	Certified units/sales
United Kingdom (BPI)	Silver	60,000^{‡}
^{‡} Sales+streaming figures based on certification alone.
