= 55 Cadillac =

Studio album by Andrew W.K.
- Released: September 1, 2009
- Recorded: 2009
- Genre: New-age; rock
- Length: 39:37
- Label: Ecstatic Peace!; Skyscraper Music Maker
- Producer: Andrew W.K.

Andrew W.K. chronology
A Wild Pear (2009)	55 Cadillac (2009)	Gundam Rock (2009)

Professional ratings
Aggregate scores
Source	Rating
AnyDecentMusic?	5.1/10
Metacritic	59/100
Review scores
Source	Rating
AllMusic	3.5/5 stars
The A.V. Club	B
Drowned in Sound	6/10
Mojo	3/5 stars
PopMatters	3/10
Slant Magazine	2/5 stars
Uncut	3/5 stars

55 Cadillac is the fourth studio album by American musician Andrew W.K., released in the US on September 1, 2009, in the UK on September 7, and on September 8, 2009, through Ecstatic Peace! on vinyl format and W.K.'s own record label, Skyscraper Music Maker. 55 Cadillac is an instrumental solo piano album featuring "new-age" spontaneous solo piano improvisations; it was recorded in Cleveland, Ohio.

Writing about the album's release in The Guardian, Andrew W.K. stated that he wanted 55 Cadillac "to sound like freedom," partially inspired by the end of legal troubles that had plagued the release of his third album Close Calls with Brick Walls, continuing: "The sound of a piano being played by a free man – nothing more, nothing less. This was the first chance in almost 10 years where I was allowed to simply play and record an instrument – no songwriters, no lyrics to learn, no overdubs, no slow fixes, no remixes, no video shoots or interview practice – just the sound of someone sitting in room playing piano for the sake of it. No one telling me what to play, or how to play it. And no masterplans, high-concept visions, worldwide goals with roll-out schedules. No style consultants or acting coaches. No more meetings with sponsors or computerized yelling. No more threats."

== Track listing ==
No.	Title	Length
1.	"Begin the Engine"	8:47
2.	"Seeing the Car"	2:57
3.	"Night Driver"	6:34
4.	"Central Park Cruiser"	2:29
5.	"5"	4:46
6.	"City Time"	5:21
7.	"Car Nightmare"	4:50
8.	"Cadillac"	3:53
