= Bulb Records =

- Founded: 1993
- Founder: Peter Larson and James Magas
- Distributor: Surefire
- Genre: Indie
- Country of origin: United States
- Location: Adrian, Michigan
- Official website: Bulb Record's Official Website

Bulb Records is a Michigan-based record label that was formed in 1993 by Peter Larson (now of the two-piece metal rock band 25 Suaves), and James Magas (now known simply as Magas).

The label had originally started putting out records by local Michigan avant-garde musical acts, but extended its roster to nationally and internationally known artists.

== Artists ==
- Andrew W.K.
- Wolf Eyes
- Deuce (singer)
- Couch
- Danse Asshole
- Duotron
- 25 Suaves
- Mr. Quintron
- Forcefield
- Math
- Mindflayer
- Oakley Hall
- Black Elf Speaks
- Elvish Presley
- The USA Is A Monster
- King Brothers
- Galen
- Prehensile Monkeytailed Skink.

== Discography ==
Bulb Records' first release was actually catalog number BLB-026. Larson and Magas chose this number to make it appear as though they had more records out at the time. This has resulted in many gaps in the Bulb catalog, and much confusion over release dates.

- Steev Mike 7-inch (Unofficial Item of Interest)
- BLB-001 BULB/BLACKJACK split #1
- BLB-002 BULB/BLACKJACK split #2
- BLB-003/OVR-003 COUCH/BULLET IN THE HEAD split 12-inch EP
- BLB-004 Mr. Velocity Hopkins "Das Boot" cassette (a CHOCOLATE MONK release)
- BLB-005 PREHENSILE MONKEYTAILED SKINK "I am a gorilla" 7-inch (Blackjack Records)
- BLB-006/Insignificant MR. VELOCITY HOPKINS Self Titled/ "In Space" CD
- BLB-007 Duotron "The complete illustrated book of..." (a SCRATCH RECORDS release) CD
- PV2/BLB012 King Brothers "Live in America" - Video
- BLB-013 The Monarchs - "In Mono" 7-inch
- BLB015 25 Suaves "s/t" CDR
- BLB016 Dance Asshole I
- BLB017 Dance Asshole II
- BLB018 Dance Asshole III
- BLB019 Dance Asshole IV
- BLB020 Dance Asshole V
- BLB021 DANCE ASSHOLE 0
- BLB023 SUFFUCKATORS "Suffuckation Nation""s/t" Cassette
- BLB-026 COUCH - "s/t" 7-inch
- BLB-027 PREHENSILE MONKEYTAILED SKINK "We Found a 4-Trak" 7-inch
- BLB-028 CORNELIUS GOMEZ - "s/t" 7-inch
- BLB-029 PREHENSILE MONKEYTAILED SKINK - "Midnight Dynamite" 7-inch
- BLB-030 BULLET IN THE HEAD - 7-inch
- BLB-031 SHRIEK - "Bunnies" 7-inch
- BLB-032 MATH - "Bask Math" CD
- BLB-033 The MONARCHS - "Play For you" 7-inch EP
- BLB-034 IN BULB O PHONIC compilation CD
- BLB-035 THE TWEEZERS- Electric Servant of Everyman" 7-inch EP
- BLB-036 The DEMOLITION DOLL RODS- 7-inch
- BLB-037 MR. VELOCITY HOPKINS/ The MANY MOODS OF MARLON MAGAS- split 7-inch EP
- BLB-038 GALEN- "The Heroin Bench" 7-inch
- BLB-039 QUINTRON - "I.F. 001-011" LP
- BLB-040 DUOTRON - "We modern, We Now!" LP
- BLB-041 COUCH- "Glass Brothers" CD
- BLB-042 QUINTRON - "The Amazing Spellcaster" LP
- BLB-043 TEMPLE OF BON MATIN- "Enduro" CD
- BLB-044 Quintron/Flossie and the Unicorns - "M.C. Baby Kitty/Snow machine" split 7-inch
- BLB-045 INCAPACITANTS "Asset Without Liability" CD
- BLB-046 DUOTRON "Battalia Feminil!" LP
- BLB-047 PTERODACTYLS - "Reborn" CD
- BLB-049 MR. QUINTRON- "The first two records" CD
- BLB-051 Mr. Quintron "Satan is Dead" LP
- BLB-052 Mr. QUINTRON "Satan is Dead" CD
- BLB-053 YOKOZUNA ICHIBAN- "Dismay" CD
- BLB-054 TEMPLE OF BON MATIN-"Bullet into Mesmer's Brain" CD
- BLB-055 25 SUAVES-"Chinese Students Study Abroad!" 7-inch
- BLB-056 KING BROTHERS- CD
- BLB-057 KING BROTHERS- LP
- PV01/BLB-058 GASOLINE Video
- BLB-059 25 SUAVES - CD
- BLB-060 KING BROTHERS- 7-inch
- BLB-061 Mikey Wild "I Was Punk Before You Were" CD
- BLB-062 QUINTRON - "The Amazing Spellcaster" CD
- BLB-063 VOODOO BOOTS (Japan Rock 7-inch series #1) Japan Rock Series 7-inch
- BLB-064 Mr. Quintron (BULB GOLD REISSUE series #2)"I.F. 001-011" CD
- BLB-065 Wolf Eyes "Fortune Dove" 12-inch
- BLB-068 Andrew W.K. "Girls Own Juice" CD
- BLB-069 WOLF EYES “Wolf Eyes” CD
- BLB-072 QUINTRON "The Unmasked Organ Light-Year of Infinity Man" LP
- BLB-073DX ANDREW W.K. "Party Til You Puke" 12-inch/CD
- BLB-074 TEMPLE OF BON MATIN "Cabin in the Sky" LP
- BLB-075 MC TRACHIOTOMY "w/Love From Tahiti" CD
- BLB-076 ASS BABOONS OF VENUS "Phuket ala Bum Bum" CD
- BLB-078 25 SUAVES/ONEIDA "Street People" Split Live LP
- BLB-079 WOLF EYES "DREAD" CD
- BLB-082 25 SUAVES "1938" CD
- BLB-083 25 SUAVES "1938" LP
- BLB-084 MIND FLAYER "Take Your Skin Off" LP
- BLB-085 MIND FLAYER "Take Your Skin Off" CD
- BLB-087 FORCE FIELD "Lord of the Rings Modulator" 2LP/CD
- BLB-088 BULB SINGLES #1 CD
- BLB-089 TERRIFYING SICKOS "s/t" LP
- BLB-091 TODD s/t CD
- BLB-092 BULB SINGLES #2 CD
- BLB-094 ELVISH PRESLEY "Black Elf Speaks" CD
- BLB-095 ROITAN s/t CD
- BLB-097 OAKLEY HALL s/t CD
- BLB-098 PEARLS AND BRASSS Limited Edition LP
- BLB-099 25 SUAVES "I Want it Loud" CD

=== Videos ===
- PV2/BLB012 King Brothers "Live in America" - Video
- VLB-026 PREHENSILE MONKEYTAILED SKINK "Fear of Practice" Video
- VLB-027 MR. VELOCITY HOPKINS- "Franco-Prussian War" Video
- VLB-028/VLB-002 THE PTERODACTYLS - "Self-Titled" Video

=== Live at the Bulb Clubhouse CD-R Series ===
- Nautical Almanac/Meerk Puffy
- Prurient
- Temple of Bon Matin
- 36
- Suffuckators
- 25 Suaves
- Fat Day
- Mind Flayer
- King Brothers
- Wolf Eyes
- Kites
- Sightings

== See also ==
- List of record labels
