= James E. Krier =

American legal scholar

James E. Krier is the Earl Warren DeLano Professor Emeritus of Law at the University of Michigan Law School. He retired in 2019. His teaching and research interests were primarily in the fields of property, contracts, and law and economics, and he taught courses on contracts, property, trusts and estates, behavioral law and economics, and pollution policy.

== Biography ==
Krier earned his Bachelor of Science in Economics with honors from the University of Wisconsin in 1961. After spending two years in the United States Army, he enrolled in the University of Wisconsin Law School and was an articles editor for the Wisconsin Law Review. He earned his J.D. in 1966, graduating top of his class.

After graduation, he served for one year as a law clerk to the Hon. Roger J. Traynor, Chief Justice of the Supreme Court of California, and then joined Arnold & Porter in Washington, D.C. as an associate.

After two years at Arnold & Porter, he joined the UCLA School of Law in 1969 as an assistant professor, becoming a full professor in 1972. He was a visiting fellow at Wolfson College, Oxford in 1976.

He was appointed to the Stanford School of Law in 1978. In 1979, his son Andrew W.K. was born. He joined the Michigan Law faculty in 1983, and has been a visiting professor at Harvard Law School, Oxford University, University of Alabama School of Law and Cardozo School of Law. In 2012, he was awarded the Brigham–Kanner Property Rights Prize from William & Mary Law School.

== Works ==
Krier is the author or co-author of several books, including Environmental Law and Policy, Pollution and Policy, and the widely used casebook Property (6th edition) with Jesse Dukeminier. His recent articles have been published in the Harvard Law Review, the Supreme Court Economic Review, and the UCLA Law Review.

== Publications ==
- James E. Krier, Michael H. Schill, Gregory S. Alexander, and Jesse Dukeminier. Property (Aspen Publishers, Inc.; 2006) ISBN 0-7355-5792-6
- James E. Krier, Pollution and Policy: A Case Essay on California and Federal Experience With Motor Vehicle Air Pollution, 1940-1975 University of California Press (June 1978) ISBN 0-5200-3204-7
