= You're Not Alone (Andrew W.K. album) =

2018 album

Studio album by Andrew W.K.
- Released: March 2, 2018
- Recorded: 2017
- Genre: Hard rock
- Length: 52:32
- Labels: RED; Sony
- Producer: Andrew W.K.

Andrew W.K. chronology
The "Party All Goddamn Night" EP (2011)	You're Not Alone (2018)	God Is Partying (2021)

Singles from You're Not Alone
- 1. "Music Is Worth Living For" Released: January 12, 2018; 2. "Ever Again" Released: January 29, 2018

You're Not Alone is the fifth studio album by American musician Andrew W.K., released on March 2, 2018 through Sony Music. It was his first album since 2009's Gundam Rock, which marks the longest gap between his studio albums.

The art for the album was painted by fantasy artists Julie Bell and Boris Vallejo. Juxtapoz premiered the collaboration and unveiled the cover via a documentary short video in November 2017.

== Music and lyrics ==
You're Not Alone is characterized by dramatic rock songs that feature distorted guitars, pianos, synthesizers, and multi-tracked vocals. Though much of the music is fast and energetic, the album also contains slower-paced songs and ballads.

In a press release, Andrew W.K. said of the album: "I'm going for the sound of pure, unadulterated power; every emotion, every thought, every experience, every sensation, every fear, every joy, every clarity, every confusion, every up, every down... all extruded and concentrated into one thick syrup of super life-force feeling, and then psychically amplified by the celebratory spirit of glorious partying."

The album also contains three spoken-word tracks, in which Andrew W.K. discusses his personal philosophies toward self-confidence, seeing the good side to the bad moments in life, and thinking positively. Lyrically, the songs on the album generally adhere to these same themes.

== Reception ==
Professional ratings
Aggregate scores
Source	Rating
AnyDecentMusic?	6.9/10
Metacritic	77/100
Review scores
Source	Rating
AllMusic	4/5 stars
The A.V. Club	A
Classic Rock	4.5/5 stars
Exclaim!	6/10
Kerrang!	4/5
NME	4/5 stars
Pitchfork	6.6/10
Q	4/5 stars
Record Collector	5/5 stars
Uncut	7/10

Upon its release, You're Not Alone received generally favorable reviews from music critics, who appreciated its excitement, upbeat songwriting, and lyrics promoting self-confidence. The A.V. Club described the album as "a pack of his best songs", commenting, "As always, Andrew W.K. builds anthems brick by brick, reinforcing huge choruses with multi-tracked vocals and earworm piano lines, all the better to make you feel like a participant as much as a listener." Nick Reilly of NME wrote, "In reality, he might just be the all essential boost of positivity and endurance that we didn't know we needed. The lure of the party, it seems, is stronger than ever." NPR's Jason Heller said that "the sprawling, 16-song album is a cornucopia of spirit-lifting, even occasionally reflective party jams every inch as valiant as its cover."

Some critics wrote that the album contains too much unnecessary material, with Luke Pearson writing for Exclaim! that the album suffers from "plodding, overlong tracks".

== Track listing ==
No.	Title	Length
1.	"The Power of Partying"	1:36
2.	"Music Is Worth Living For"	4:22
3.	"Ever Again"	3:18
4.	"I Don’t Know Anything"	2:54
5.	"The Feeling of Being Alive"	0:47
6.	"Party Mindset"	4:11
7.	"The Party Never Dies"	3:00
8.	"Give Up on You"	3:16
9.	"Keep on Going"	4:06
10.	"In Your Darkest Moments"	1:05
11.	"The Devil's on Your Side"	5:22
12.	"Break the Curse"	6:22
13.	"Total Freedom"	3:56
14.	"Beyond Oblivion"	4:06
15.	"Confusion and Clarity"	1:01
16.	"You're Not Alone"	3:04
Total length:		52:32

Japan bonus track
No.	Title	Length
17.	"The Creation of Sound"	3:55
Total length:		56:39

== Charts ==
Chart (2018)	Peak position
Scottish Albums (Official Charts)	74
UK Album Sales (OCC)	90
UK Album Downloads (Official Charts)	80
UK Rock & Metal Albums (Official Charts)	5
US Billboard 200	197
US Top Hard Rock Albums (Billboard)	9
US Top Rock Albums (Billboard)	36
US Indie Store Album Sales (Billboard)	2
