= Noon and Eternity =

Studio album by To Live and Shave in L.A.
- Released: October 31, 2006
- Recorded: 2006
- Studio: Sonic Youth's studio, New York City
- Genre: Sludge rock; avant-garde; drone
- Length: 1:06:24
- Label: Menlo Park Recordings
- Producer: Don Fleming; Tom Smith; Andrew W.K.

To Live and Shave in L.A. chronology
Horóscopo: Sanatorio de Molière (2006)	Noon and Eternity (2006)	Les Tricoteuses (2007)

Professional ratings
Review scores
Source	Rating
AllMusic	3.5/5 stars
Pitchfork	8.0/10
Tiny Mix Tapes	4.5/5 stars
Verbicide	extremely negative

Noon and Eternity is a studio album by experimental rock collective To Live and Shave in L.A., released on October 31, 2006. The album features production by Andrew W.K.

== Background ==
Group leader Tom Smith commented on the making of the album: "We tracked the album in 2004 at Sonic Youth's studio in New York. Andrew WK played electronic drums. Thurston played guitar. Rat and Don Fleming played. Ben was there. I had to write the material in two days. My son came back from Iraq... He's fairly left-leaning, but he wanted a Hemingway adventure. I have a lot of love for my son, so a lot of those songs stemmed from revulsion to the Bush war machine. But tying something to a political moment can be suicidal for an artwork's longevity. So rather than making those political connotations overt, I made them universal. I made it about the love of my son, who had been changed by his experience."

== Track listing ==
1. "This Home and Fear" – 24:25
2. "Early 1880s" – 19:23
3. "Percent Obstruct Street" – 13:09
4. "Mothers over Silverpoint" – 9:32
