= King Brothers (rock band) =

Japanese rock band

King Brothers [キング・ブラザーズ] is a rock band from Nishinomiya City in Hyogo Prefecture, Japan. Formed in 1997, the band made its major label debut on Toshiba EMI in 2001. The group was banned from performing at several venues in Osaka after destructive live shows.

== Personnel ==
=== Current members ===
- Keizo (Vocals, Guitar)
- Marya (Guitar, Screaming)
- Shinnosuke (Bass)
- Taichi (Drums, Power)

=== Former members ===
- Kitauchi (Guitar)
- Jun (Drums)
- Kawasaki (Drums)
- Linda (Drums)

== Discography ==
=== Albums ===
- King Brothers (1998) (known as the Bulb Edition)
- ★★★★★★★ (1999) (known as the Star Edition)
- キングブラザーズ (25 February 2001)(known as the Red Edition)
- King Brothers (23 May 2001) (known as the Rainbow Edition)
- 6×3 (2002) (EP produced by Jon Spencer)
- 13 (2003)
- Blues (2004)

=== Video/DVD ===
- American Tour '99
- Live at Cafe Blue (2004)

== Tours ==
- King Brothers Conquest of Japan Tour (2000)
- King Brothers Tour 2003
- Japan Insanity - Charming Deep-Sea Party (2004)
- Lesson 1, The Devil's Violent Classroom (Tear Out Page 2004 of the Dangerous Beat Course) (2004)
- One Hundred Ways to Victimize You, The King (2005)
- The Devil's Time Travel - Chase the Evil Brothers Flying Through Time!! (2005)
- New Zealand Tour With The DHDFD's 2007
- 2008 Japan "Tour of Hells Across Japan" The DHDFD's Vs The King Brothers and Watusi Zombie
