= Santos Party House =

New York City nightclub

Coordinates: 40.71768°N 74.00137°W

Santos Party House was a New York City nightclub located at 96 Lafayette Street between Walker and White Streets in the TriBeCa neighborhood of downtown Manhattan. Originally named the "Lafayette Street Jungle Gym", Santos Party House was recognized as the "Best New Nightclub" by Paper magazine's Annual Nightlife Awards, and has also won awards for its parties, sound system, lighting, and dance floor.

The nightclub was a two-level, 8,000-square-foot (740 m^{2}) music venue designed by Ronald Castellano to function as a concert hall, dance club, and lounge. It took the partners, including noted musician Andrew W.K., three years to acquire a cabaret license and finish the creation of the space, with the downstairs space opening on May 14, 2008, and the upstairs space opening on June 1, 2008. In total, the venue features three bars, black walls and ceilings, dark wood floors, tall columns, and an array of ever-changing decorations.

Santos Party House's last night of operation was May 29, 2016, on which it hosted the controversial punk festival Oi! Fest. The venue received backlash due to Oi! Fest’s association with neo-Nazism.

== Awards and honors ==
Santos Party House received a number of awards, including: The People's Choice Award for Best Night Club, Best New Club, Best DJ Night from Paper magazine, Best New Dance Floor from the Village Voice, as well as additional awards for its sound and lighting systems from New York Press and L Magazine.
