= Les Hou-Lops =

Canadian musical group

- Years active: 1962–1969; 1994–
- Members: Yvan Côté (guitarist); Jean-Claude Bernard (bassist); Jean-Claude Domingue (guitarist); Jacques Chicoine (keyboardist); Isabelle Allard (drummer); Serge Sauvé (singer)
- Past members: Gilles Rousseau (singer) (1963–1969); Claude Laviolette (drummer) (1962–1969); René Larose (guitarist) (until 1963); Georges Dubuc (saxophonist) (1962); René Hamelin (guitarist) (1968–1969); Denis Lapierre (drummer) (1995); Yvan Godbout (singer) (1995–1996)

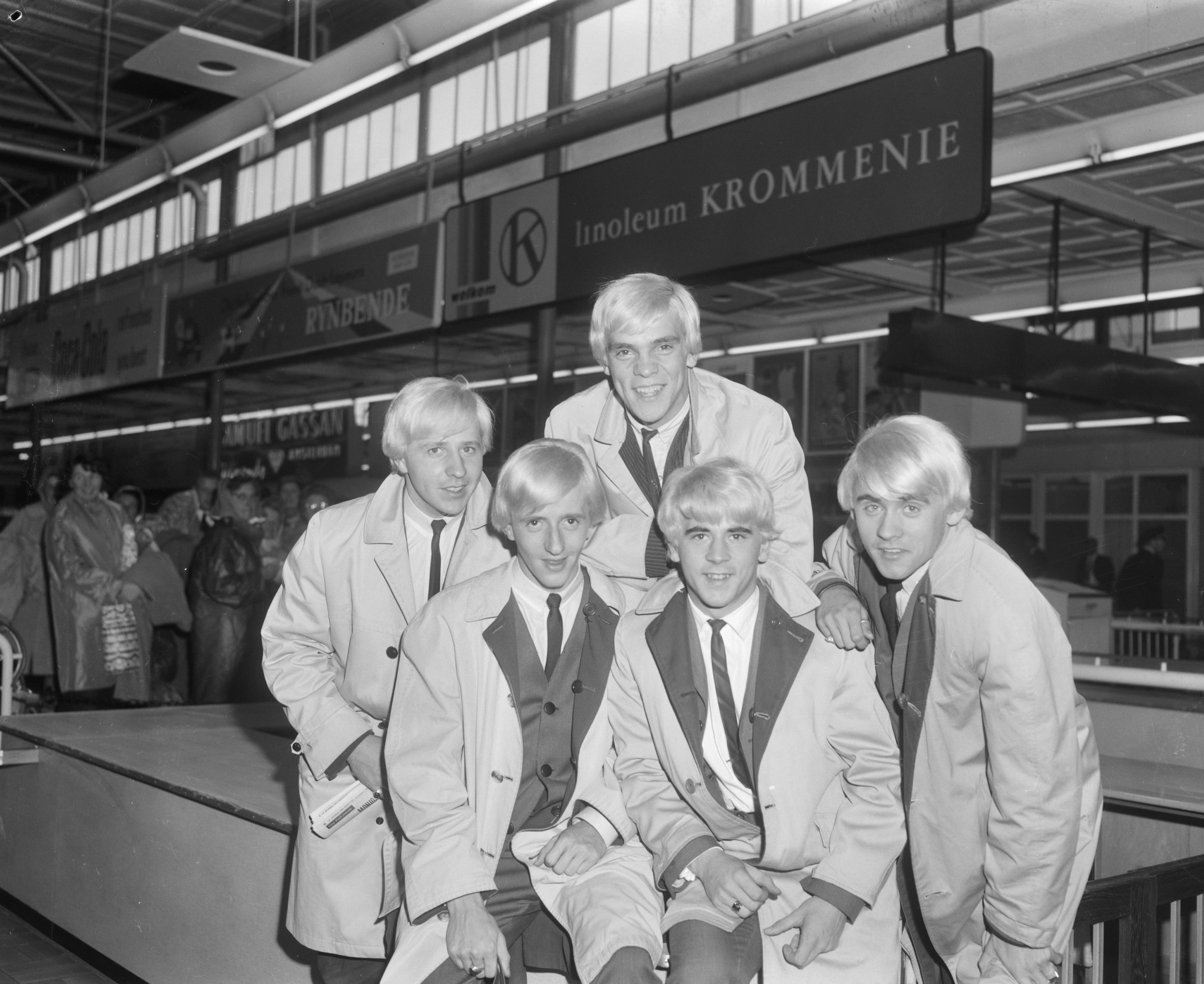
Les Hou-Lops in 1964

Les Hou-Lops, briefly known as the Têtes Blanches, were a Québécois band active from 1962 to 1969. They reunited in 1994, and are still active.

== History ==
Les Hou-Lops were formed in 1962. They were from Saint-Hyacinthe. They at first performed in the dance halls of the Eastern Townships. They won first prize at an amateur competition and became the in-house musicians for the show Bonsoir copains in 1963–1964.

In 1964 they bleached their hair and changed their name to the "Têtes Blanches". They were sued by the Classels and had to return to the name "Les Hou-Lops" in late 1965. The Hou-Lops were very popular in dance halls, with a rhythm'n blues and rock repertoire similar to The Animals' and The Rolling Stones'. Their successes on disc include "Mother-ln-Law", "Blue jeans sur la plage", "Oh non", "Vendredi m'obsède" and "Je devine la vérité". They composed part of their repertoire, sometimes working with the journalist Louise Rousseau. In 1964, they had a first trip to Europe in France, Belgium and the Netherlands, during which they met The Animals, with whom they got along well.

They won the yé-yé group trophy at the 1965 Festival du disque with the album C'est chip. They had a trip to Europe in spring 1966, during which they performed as the opening act of the Rolling Stones at l'Olympia and participated in the Rallye du Rock at Monaco. Their manager by then was Norman Knight. In 1968, they were the stars of a Starovan with Johnny Hallyday and participated in Musicorama tour for a third year in a row. On the same year, René Hamelin replaced Jean-Claude Domingue on guitar.

The Hou-Lops dissolved in June 1969. They were one of the most important band of Quebec in the 1960s.

In 1994, the surviving members of the group revived Les Hou-Lops. They are still active.

== Discography ==
Singles
Year	Title
1963	Pachilla / Tjoelala
1964	RPM 6000 / À la planche
1964	À quoi bon / J’suis en amour
1965	Mother-In-Law / She's The One
1965	Pour toute la vie / Demande-moi pardon
1965	I Know / Lonely Riverman
1965	Blue jeans sur la plage / Quand on est amoureux
1965	Tout ira très bien / Quand les roses
1966?	Your Love Was Mine / Mother-In-Law
1966	Everything's Alright / Batman
1966	Elle a changé de décor / Oh non
1966	Je te laisse tomber / Parents de la terre
1967	Vendredi m’obsède / T’ennuies-tu seule sans moi
1967	Je devine la vérité / Oui j’ai compris
1967	Pas besoin d’un docteur / Je vous salue Marie
1967	Fais-moi signe / J’étudie mon grec
1968	À quoi bon / C’est elle qui m’a compris
1968	Je suis heureux / Il a suffi d’un jour
1968	Je pleure comme un enfant / Tu aimes
1968	U.S. Président / Bo Bo The Cat
1969	C’est ma faute / Tu aimes
1969	Une fille et un garçon / Je suis ton amie
1974	Blue jeans sur la plage / Vendredi m’obsède
1974	Mother-In-Law / Quand on est amoureux

Albums
Year	Title
1964	Voici les Hou-Lops / Têtes blanches
1965	Grand Prix du disque 1965
1965	C’est chip
1967	Off
1968	Les Hou-Lops
1968	Les Hou-Lops
1968	Réveillon chez la famille Canusa
1968	$1 000 000 Hou-Lops
1969	Le palmarès des Hou-Lops
1991	Les Hou-Lops, volume 1
1992	Les Hou-Lops, volume 2
