= The Wolf (Andrew W.K. album) =

Studio album by Andrew W.K.
- Released: September 9, 2003
- Recorded: 2003
- Genres: Hard rock, pop metal
- Length: 43:23
- Label: Island
- Producers: Andrew W.K.; John Fields; Scott Humphrey

Andrew W.K. chronology
I Get Wet (2001)	The Wolf (2003)	Close Calls with Brick Walls (2006)

Singles from The Wolf
- 1. "Tear It Up" Released: July 2003; 2. "Never Let Down" Released: September 2003; 3. "Long Live the Party" Released: 2003 (Japan)

Professional ratings
Aggregate scores
Source	Rating
Metacritic	78/100
Review scores
Source	Rating
AllMusic	3.5/5 stars
Alternative Press	3/5
Blender	4/5 stars
Chicago Sun-Times	3/4 stars
Drowned in Sound	4.5/5 stars
Entertainment Weekly	B+
Q	3/5 stars
Rolling Stone	3/5 stars
Spin	B
The Village Voice	C+

The Wolf is the second studio album by American rock musician Andrew W.K., released on Island Records on September 9, 2003.

== History ==
In contrast to W.K.'s party-oriented debut, The Wolf was a more elaborate and ornate effort, with insightful lyrics and a more melodic sound. This did not stop it from being successful. The album also found W.K. playing all of the instruments on the album, whereas on I Get Wet he split the chore with studio musicians. The Wolf spawned the singles, "Never Let Down" and "Tear It Up".

This album was originally titled Blow Your Bone, but the title was deemed "too offensive" by Island Records, so Andrew W.K. opted to use the name The Wolf. Cover art was even made with the original title, but it differed from the cover art of The Wolf. It is not known whether the album had different material on it, as the only actual thing referencing the title was an ad made just before the album's release. The release date on the ad for Blow Your Bone did not change from the date that The Wolf was actually released.

The Japan release of The Wolf came with a bonus DVD with behind-the-scenes footage (mainly shot in Japan) that cannot be found on any other release.

=== DualDisc version ===
This album was included among a group of 15 DualDisc releases that were test-marketed in two cities: Boston and Seattle. The DualDisc has the standard album on one side, and bonus material on the second side.

== Track listing ==
No.	Title	Length
1.	"Victory Strikes Again"	2:09
2.	"Long Live the Party"	4:00
3.	"Tear It Up"	3:55
4.	"Free Jumps"	3:33
5.	"Never Let Down"	3:58
6.	"Your Rules"	2:27
7.	"The Song"	4:17
8.	"Make Sex"	0:44
9.	"Totally Stupid"	4:30
10.	"Really in Love"	4:42
11.	"The End of Our Lives"	4:49
12.	"I Love Music"	4:19

Japanese bonus tracks
No.	Title	Length
13.	"Party Hard" (live)	3:04
14.	"She Is Beautiful" (live)	3:33

== Personnel ==
- Andrew W.K. – vocals, guitar, bass, drums, piano, synthesizer
- Ken Andrews – guitar (bonus tracks)
- Jimmy Coup – guitar (bonus tracks)
- Erik Payne – guitar (bonus tracks)
- Frank Werner – guitar (bonus tracks)
- Gregg Roberts – bass (bonus tracks)
- Donald Tardy – drums (bonus tracks)
- Billy Trudel – backing vocals (tracks 1, 5, 10, 11)
- Roger Lian – editing
- Ryan Boesch – engineering, recording
- Howie Weinberg – mastering
- Dave Way – mixing
- Lior Goldenberg – addition mixing and recording

== Charts ==
Chart performance
Chart (2003)	Peak position
Canadian Albums (Nielsen SoundScan)	84
Japanese Albums (Oricon)	14
UK Albums (OCC)	152
US Billboard 200	61
