= Sightings (band) =

American noise rock music group

Sightings is a New York City-based trio of musicians, operating on the boundaries of rock, noise, and avant-garde sounds. The lineup consists of Mark Morgan on guitar, Richard Hoffman on bass and Jon Lockie on drums. The band debuted with a 7" on the Freedom From label and has since released records through Load Records, Psych-O-Path, Fusetron, Dais Records and Brah Records. "Through The Panama" was produced by Andrew W.K.

== Discography ==
=== Albums ===
- Sightings (2002)
- Michigan Haters (2002)
- Absolutes (2003)
- Arrived in Gold (2004)
- End Times (2006)
- Through the Panama (2007)
- City of Straw (2010)
- Future Accidents (2011)
- Michigan Haters (issued on LP) (2011)
- Terribly Well (Dais Records, 2013)
- Amusers and Puzzlers (Dais Records, 2015)
