= God Is Partying =

Studio album by Andrew W.K.
- Released: September 10, 2021
- Genre: Heavy metal
- Length: 51:46
- Label: Napalm
- Producers: Andrew W.K.; Ted Young

Andrew W.K. chronology
You're Not Alone (2018)	God Is Partying (2021)	Temptation to Exist (2026)

Singles from God Is Partying
- 1. "Babalon" Released: February 17, 2021; 2. "I'm in Heaven" Released: May 6, 2021

God Is Partying is the sixth studio album by American rock musician Andrew W.K., released on September 10, 2021, through Napalm Records.

The album's release was announced on May 6, 2021, along with its second single, "I'm in Heaven". That single was accompanied by a music video directed by Phem C. Palmer. The first single, "Babalon", was released in February 2021.

Andrew W.K. played all instruments on the album, which is co-produced by Ted Young. The album is markedly darker in tone compared to previous efforts.

== Reception ==
Professional ratings
Aggregate scores
Source	Rating
Metacritic	76/100
Review scores
Source	Rating
AllMusic	3.5/5 stars
The A.V. Club	B+
Blabbermouth	6/10
Classic Rock	4/5 stars
Exclaim!	8/10
Kerrang!	3/5 stars
Metal Hammer	4/5 stars
Metal Injection	6/10
musicOMH	3/5 stars
NME	4/5 stars

At Metacritic, which assigns a weighted average rating out of 100 to reviews from mainstream publications, the release received an average score of 76, based on eight reviews, which equates to "generally favorable reviews".

== Track listing ==
No.	Title	Length
1.	"Everybody Sins"	6:12
2.	"Babalon"	4:17
3.	"No One to Know"	6:33
4.	"Stay True to Your Heart"	3:46
5.	"Goddess Partying" (instrumental)	0:57
6.	"I'm in Heaven"	3:15
7.	"Remember Your Oath"	4:17
8.	"My Tower"	6:24
9.	"And Then We Blew Apart"	4:27

CD version extra tracks
No.	Title	Length
10.	"I Made It"	4:09
11.	"Not Anymore"	3:12
12.	"Everybody Sins (Edit)"	4:17
Total length:		51:50

== Charts ==
Chart (2021)	Peak position
UK Album Downloads (Official Charts)	94
UK Independent Albums (Official Charts)	41
UK Rock & Metal Albums (Official Charts)	13
US Top Album Sales (Billboard)	70
US Top Current Album Sales (Billboard)	42
