= Close Calls with Brick Walls =

Studio album by Andrew W.K.
- Released: July 5, 2006
- Recorded: 2005–2006
- Studio: Water Music, Hoboken, New Jersey; The Hit Factory, Manhattan, New York; Think Tank, Hoboken; Heaven, Manhattan; The Magic Shop, Manhattan; Guardian Sound, Manhattan; Shelter Island, Manhattan
- Genre: Hard rock
- Length: 47:49
- Label: Universal
- Producer: Andrew W.K.; Don Fleming

Andrew W.K. chronology
The Wolf (2003)	Close Calls with Brick Walls (2006)	The Japan Covers (2008)

US vinyl release

Professional ratings
Review scores
Source	Rating
Drowned in Sound	8/10
Entertainment Weekly	C−
MusicOMH	3.5/5 stars
NME	7/10
The Observer	4/5 stars
Pitchfork	6.8/10
Stylus Magazine	B+
Uncut	4/5 stars

Close Calls with Brick Walls is the third studio album by American musician Andrew W.K. It was originally released through Universal Records in July 2006 in Japan with an exclusive bonus DVD and in Korea with four exclusive bonus tracks, before finally being released to the rest of the world on CD in 2010.

== Production ==
The album marked a major change in sound, abandoning the "wall of sound" heard on earlier albums for a more traditional rock sound, and with Andrew's vocals sung rather than screamed. Songs of more experimental nature were also featured on this album. The album received a wide array of reactions from fans and critics.

A video was released for "Not Going to Bed" in Japan upon the album's release, and an animated video for "I Want to See You Go Wild" was released in June 2010, to support the re-released 2-disc edition. A music video for "I'm a Vagabond" (from the Mother of Mankind rarities album) was also released.

== Legal disputes ==
Due to legal disputes regarding the ownership of the name "Andrew W.K.", Close Calls with Brick Walls was initially only released in Japan and Korea. On August 18, 2007, it was given a limited release in America only on vinyl on Load Records with 5 exclusive bonus tracks, but only became widely available on CD to the rest of the world in March 2010, bundled with a second disc containing a collection of rare and unreleased songs entitled Mother of Mankind.

In September 2009, writing in the British newspaper, The Guardian, Andrew W.K. acknowledged legal disputes around his name: "At the end of 2004, an old friend of mine got in some business trouble and basically decided to take it out on me. To cut a long story short, this person is someone I worked very closely with and had a formal and family business relationship with. Due to various complaints this person had with me, they were able to turn my life and career upside down. I wasn't allowed to use my own name within certain areas of the US entertainment industry and we were in a debate about who owned the rights to my image, and who should get credit for 'inventing' it. This made my life complicated and intense for a few years, but I kept working and doing whatever I could to keep moving forward."

== Track listing ==
=== Original release ===
No.	Title	Length
1.	"I Came for You"	2:16
2.	"Close Calls with Bal Harbour"	1:22
3.	"Not Going to Bed"	2:57
4.	"You Will Remember Tonight"	4:06
5.	"Pushing Drugs"	2:41
6.	"Hand on the Place"	3:20
7.	"One Brother"	2:25
8.	"Las Vegas, Nevada"	3:00
9.	"Dr. Dumont"	1:06
10.	"I Want to See You Go Wild"	3:00
11.	"When I'm High"	3:16
12.	"Golden Eyed Dog"	0:28
13.	"Into the Clear"	1:33
14.	"Mark My Grace"	3:11
15.	"Don't Call Me Andy"	2:45
16.	"The Background"	2:55
17.	"Slam John Against a Brick Wall"	3:53
18.	"The Moving Room"	3:37

Korean bonus tracks
No.	Title	Length
19.	"Can You Dance with Me?"	2:08
20.	"This Is My World"	2:45
21.	"I Want Your Face"	2:25
22.	"Let's Go on a Date"	2:22

U.S. vinyl bonus tracks
No.	Title	Length
19.	"Big Party"	2:45
20.	"We're Not Gunna Get Old"	4:50
21.	"Kicks and Bricks"	2:58
22.	"I've Got Know Fear"	3:26
23.	"We Will Boogie"	3:14

=== 2010 release ===
Disc 2: Mother of Mankind (Rare & Unreleased 1999–2010)
No.	Title	Length
1.	"We Party (You Shout)"	2:40
2.	"High Five"	3:31
3.	"Let's Go on a Date"	2:19
4.	"We Got a Groove"	5:13
5.	"Sarah Notto"	2:06
6.	"I'm a Vagabond"	2:42
7.	"I've Got Know Fear"	3:26
8.	"Big Party"	2:45
9.	"Who Knows?"	2:22
10.	"Coming Bad"	4:12
11.	"Can You Dance with Me?"	2:08
12.	"Kicks and Bricks"	2:58
13.	"A.W.K."	5:44
14.	"I Will Find God"	3:41
15.	"This Is My World"	2:46
16.	"Young Lord"	2:59
17.	"We're Not Gunna Get Old"	4:50
18.	"Kill Yourself"	3:16
19.	"I Want Your Face"	2:25
20.	"Jewel Street Man"	4:43
21.	"The Party God"	2:14
22.	"Doing Andrew W.K." (iTunes bonus track)	1:22

== Notes ==
Track origins:

- Track 1: Premium Collection - The Very Best So Far (aka "Party (You Shout!)")
- Tracks 3, 11, 15, 19: Close Calls with Brick Walls (Korean edition)
- Track 4: Spit 7" with Riverboat Gamblers
- Track 6: I'm a Vagabond 7" Single
- Tracks 7, 8, 12, 17: Close Calls with Brick Walls (Vinyl edition) ("We're Not Gunna Get Old" is slightly edited, the version on the vinyl ended with a capella vocals which lasted for a few seconds more)
- Track 9: background music from the film Who Knows? Live In Concert: 2000 - 2004
- Track 13: new version of a track from Girls Own Juice EP
- Track 18: new version of a track featured in a promotional release from Bulb Records, commonly referred to as the "We Want Fun" unreleased LP

All other tracks were brand new at the time of the original release.

== Personnel ==
Musicians

- Andrew W.K. – vocals, piano
- Gregg Roberts – bass, vocals
- Sgt. Frank – guitar, vocals
- E. Payne – guitar, vocals
- Kendall A. – guitar, vocals
- Rich Russo – drums
- Mattie Sweeney – guitar, vocals
- Cherie Lily – vocals
- Kimbo "Tiny" Rancourt – vocals
- Don Fleming – vocals
- D.W. – keyboard

Technical

- Steev Mike – executive producer
- Mario Dane – music direction
- Andrew W.K. – production
- Don Fleming – production
- Frank Vierti – additional production
- John Agnello – mixing, additional engineering
- Ted Young – additional mixing, engineering
- Michael McCoy – additional mixing, engineering
- Matt Azzarto – additional engineering
- Anthony Fontana – additional engineering
- Greg Calbi at Sterling Sound – mastering
- Alex Pareja – assistant engineer
- James Attles – assistant engineer
- Neeraj Khajanchi – assistant engineer
- Brian Thorn – assistant engineer
- Lindsay Marcus – assistant engineer
- Josh Patch – studio assistant
- Jordan Cooper – studio assistant
- Stefi Sakata – studio assistant
- Warren Russell-Smith – studio assistant
- Rob Grenoble – studio owner
- Steve Rosenthal – studio owner
- Steve Addabbo – studio owner
- Kate Laracuenta – studio manager
- Melanie Renecker – studio manager

Visual

- Rick Day – photography
- R.C.U. – additional photography

== Charts ==
Chart (2006)	Peak position
Japan (Oricon)	30
