= What Happened (album) =

Studio album by Emeralds
- Released: January 19, 2009
- Recorded: 2007–2008
- Studio: Home studio
- Length: 57:20
- Label: No Fun Productions; Editions Mego (2010 reissue)

Emeralds chronology
| Solar Bridge (2008) | What Happened (2009) | The Overlook (2009) |

What Happened is a studio album by the American drone trio Emeralds. The album was released as a CD through No Fun Productions on January 19, 2009. It was reissued by Editions Mego in October 2010 as a double LP record. The drone/ambient album was improvised and recorded in Cleveland and Delaware, Ohio from 2007 to 2008. It took inspiration from analogue electronic music from the 1970s and 80s, as well as 2000s drone and noise music. It was positively received by critics, with favorable reviews from Pitchfork, Exclaim, and PopMatters.

== Recording and music ==
The album's tracks were improvised live and recorded between 2007 and 2008. All tracks were recorded in Cleveland, Ohio, except for "Up in the Air", which was recorded in Delaware, Ohio.

Critics have described the album as drone and harsh ambient, with influence from krautrock, electroacoustic music, and minimalism. The album uses synth textures rooted in electronic music of the 1970s and 80s, such as Brian Eno and Robert Fripp. However, the sound design still takes influence from 2000s drone and noise music. There is a focus on melody instead of excessive experimentation, in contrast to the typical noisiness of No Fun releases.

While the liner notes do not provide detail on instrumentation, one critic said the album used analogue synths and either droning guitars or keyboards with guitar pedals. “Living Room” begins with sparse guitars before a "sizzle" of synthesizers overtakes the track. The thirteen-minute closer "Disappearing Ink" uses Frippertronics-inspired looping and expands to "gorgeousness" by the end.

== Release ==
The album was released as a limited edition CD via No Fun Productions on January 19, 2009. In October 2010, it was reissued by Editions Mego as a double LP record, due to the success of 2010's Does It Look Like I'm Here?.

== Reception ==
Professional ratings
Review scores
| Source | Rating |
|---|---|
| AllMusic | 3.5/5 stars |
| PopMatters | 7 / 10 |
| Tiny Mix Tapes | 4.0/5 stars |

The album was given an honorable mention by Pitchfork for its list of "The Top 50 Albums of 2009". Writing for the site, Philip Sherburne said the album sounded like "nothing else" with a "sound that's always in motion and impossible to pin down". Jspicer of Tiny Mix Tapes gave a favorable review, praising the album's composition and the band's "desire for a new direction".

AllMusic's François Couture rated the album three-and-a-half out of five stars, and described it as "oddly nostalgic yet resolutely forward-looking". Similarly, Nick Storring of Exclaim! praised the album for building on past sounds while still creating something new and modern. Writing for PopMatters, Craig Carson rated the album seven out of ten, and praised the album's cohesiveness, transitions, and "carefully considered" playing.

== Track listing ==
1. "Alive in the Sea of Information" – 8:01
2. "Damaged Kids" – 15:01
3. "Up in the Air" – 4:02
4. "Living Room" – 16:43
5. "Disappearing Ink" – 13:31

== Personnel ==
Adapted from the album's liner notes, which do not list specific instruments.

- Mark McGuire – music
- John Elliott – music
- Steve Hauschildt – music
- Emeralds – artwork
- James Plotkin – mastering
