= Black Vomit =

Live album by Wolf Eyes and Anthony Braxton
- Released: 2006
- Recorded: May 21, 2005
- Venue: Festival International de Musique Actuelle de Victoriaville
- Genres: noise music, free improvisation
- Length: 33:57
- Labels: Les Disques Victo; VICTO CD 099

Black Vomit is a live album by experimental music group Wolf Eyes and saxophonist Anthony Braxton. It was recorded on May 21, 2005, at the Festival International de Musique Actuelle de Victoriaville in Victoriaville, Quebec, and was released by Les Disques Victo in 2006.

Braxton first heard Wolf Eyes at a 2004 festival in Sweden. After the concert, he bought all the CDs at the band's merchandise table. The following year, at the annual Victoriaville festival, Braxton was scheduled to play in a duo format with guitarist Fred Frith on Friday, May 20 (documented on Duo (Victoriaville) 2005), and in a concert with his sextet on Sunday, May 22. On Saturday, during an event that was co-coordinated by Thurston Moore, Braxton arranged to sit in with Wolf Eyes for their set, resulting in Black Vomit.

The album consists of two tracks. Following "The Mangler," roughly 27 minutes long, Wolf Eyes member John Olson announced that the band had time for another song, and asked Braxton whether he would prefer "Leper War" (from the album Human Animal) or "Black Vomit" (from Burned Mind). Braxton immediately and enthusiastically shouted "Black Vomit!" (The track is listed as "Rationed Rot" on the CD.)

Regarding his interaction with Wolf Eyes, Braxton reflected: "they felt like family immediately. The communication was immediate." Concerning Braxton, John Olson stated: "Nate [Young] asked if he wanted to jam. And sure enough, he did – and his language on the saxophone is just insane... There is nothing he can't do on the horn. It was a perfect match."

== Reception ==
Professional ratings
Review scores
Source	Rating
AllMusic	4/5 stars

In a review for AllMusic, François Couture wrote: "Both parties clearly understand what the other stands for and adapt their approaches accordingly... Braxton purists are in for a solid headache, of course, but something really clicked between these artists, and it was all in good fun. As far as Wolf Eyes' discography goes, this is also one of their best-recorded albums."

Geoff Cowart, writing for London in Stereo, stated: "Nothing would suggest that this unholy alliance would yield results – but it's undoubtedly one of the high points in the band's caterwauling discography as Braxton seems to effortlessly add a dimension to the proceedings."

In an article for Exclaim!, Kevin Hainey commented: "Wolf Eyes tear open disturbing lairs where half-crazed amputees crawl about, their metal limbs feverishly scraping away at concrete and sheet metal debris amidst the darkly atmospheric free jazz squall they grind to a death march procession's slow ebb. Along with them or, sometimes, in stark contrast to them, Braxton wails freely, brutally chugs and screams – often adding intense effect to Wolf Eyes' jams, but sometimes jarring the listener away from their moods. But hey, when worlds collide, things aren't always so neat and tidy."

John Kealy of Brainwashed remarked: "this is a powerful and exciting album... this is Wolf Eyes at the top of their game. Braxton fits in perfectly, adding an extra dimension to the noise that lifts Black Vomit from being just another Wolf Eyes live CD to an essential release... All four are clearly enjoying themselves immensely and on the very odd occasions when the crowd are audible, it sounds like they're enjoying themselves too."

Michael Chamy, writing for the Dallas Observer, called the album "pure magical intensity, a redefinition of what music might be."

== Track listing ==
1. "The Mangler" – 26:45
2. "Rationed Rot" – 7:12

== Personnel ==
- Anthony Braxton – alto saxophone, soprano saxophone, sopranino saxophone
- Mike Connelly – electronics, metal, guitar, voice
- John Olson – electronics, metal, saxophone, gong
- Nate Young – electronics, metal, harmonica, voice
