= Along the Way (disambiguation) =

Along the Way is the first live concert DVD from punk band Bad Religion.

Along the Way may also refer to:

== Film and TV ==
- Along the Way (TV series), 1974 Canadian children's TV

== Music ==
- Along the Way, a 2003 album by Brian Hughes
- Along the Way (Colbie Caillat album), 2023
- Along the Way, a 1997 album by Jon Gordon
- Along the Way (Mark McGuire album), 2014
- Along the Way, a 2007 album by Tom Langford
- Ward One: Along the Way, a 1990 album by Bill Ward
- "Along the Way", a 1970 song by The Association
- "Along the Way", a 2022 song by Demon Hunter, from the album Exile
- "Along the Way", a 2002 song by Mushroomhead, bonus track from the album XIII
