= Solar Bridge =

Studio album by Emeralds
- Released: June 16, 2008
- Recorded: July 2007
- Studio: Home studio
- Genre: Drone, ambient, kosmische
- Length: 26:48
- Label: Hanson Records; Ghostly International (2022 reissue)

Emeralds chronology
Planetarium (2008)	Solar Bridge (2008)	What Happened (2009)

Solar Bridge is a studio album by the American drone trio Emeralds. The album was released through Hanson Records on June 16, 2008. The album was completely improvised, and recorded digitally in July 2007 at a home studio in Westlake, Ohio. Critics have described the album's genres as drone, ambient, and kosmische. The album runs for 26 minutes and is split into two tracks which consist of "meditative" drones made of two synths and a guitar. Solar Bridge was the first Emeralds album to be released on vinyl and CD, and received positive reviews from AllMusic, Pitchfork, and Tiny Mix Tapes.

== Recording and music ==
Solar Bridge was entirely improvised, without edits or overdubs. Mark McGuire plays guitar, while John Elliot plays a Korg synthesizer and Steve Hauschildt plays a Moog synthesizer. The album was recorded digitally, separating it from all of Emeralds' previous works, which were recorded onto tape. Recordings took place in July 2007, at a home studio in Westlake, Ohio (near Cleveland). The album was mastered by Denis Blackham.

The album runs for 26 minutes and is split into two tracks: "Magic" and "The Quaking Mess". Critics have described the album's genres as drone, ambient, and kosmische. Jesse Jarnow of AllMusic described the album's sound as "deep and meditative," with "flowing textures that somehow scan as simultaneously organic and synthetic". Although all three musicians play simultaneously, the separate instruments are mostly not discernable.

"Magic" consists of a "rumbling swath" of sawtooth-based drones in a minor key which increase in volume as the track progresses. McGuire uses an e-bow on his guitar to create sustained notes, a sound similar to krautrock bands Ash Ra Tempel and Eruption, according to Mangoon of Tiny Mix Tapes. “The Quaking Mess" consists of a long-form drone similar to the first track. During part of "The Quaking Mess", McGuire's guitar becomes more prominent. According to Jarnow, these Robert Fripp-sounding guitar loops momentarily reveal "Emeralds' cogs". Philip Sherburne of Pitchfork described the track's end section as a "monolithic drone" and compared it to Sunn O))). The 17-minute "Photosphere" is a bonus track available on the digital version of the album's 2022 reissue. The track is a minimal and quiet drone that sharply contrasts from the rest of the album. Sherburne described the track as "little more than a soft, shimmering cloud of the most reluctant dissonance".

== Release ==
Solar Bridge was the first Emeralds' album to be physically released on vinyl, instead of CD-Rs and cassettes, like the trio's previous albums. As well, it was the trio's first CD release (distinct from the CD-R). This led Mangoon of Tiny Mix Tapes to consider the album "Emeralds’ first 'proper' release". The album was released via Hanson Records on June 16, 2008, and reissued on vinyl in 2022 via Ghostly International with the bonus track "Photosphere". The reissue included expanded artwork and limited-edition version with a colored disc.

== Reception ==
Professional ratings
Review scores
Source	Rating
AllMusic	3.5/5 stars
Pitchfork	8.0 / 10
Tiny Mix Tapes	4.5/5 stars

Solar Bridge received positive reviews from AllMusic, Pitchfork, and Tiny Mix Tapes. Jarnow described the album as sounding "truly timeless" and gave the album three-and-a-half out of five stars. Mangoon of Tiny Mix Tapes gave the album four-and-a-half out of five stars, and described it as "criminally too short", preventing it from receiving a perfect score. Sherburne gave the album 8 out of 10 points in his 2022 review, and noted how revisiting the album helps to better understand the trio's sonic development and discography.

== Track listing ==
Solar Bridge

1. "Magic" – 12:30
2. "The Quaking Mess" – 14:15

Solar Bridge (2022 digital reissue)

1. "Magic" – 12:30
2. "The Quaking Mess" – 14:15
3. "Photosphere" (Digital Bonus) – 17:00

== Personnel ==
Adapted from the album's liner notes.

- Mark McGuire – guitar
- John Elliott – synthesizer
- Steve Hauschildt – synthesizer
- Denis Blackham – mastering engineer
- Michael Willis – design
