= Just to Feel Anything =

Studio album by Emeralds
- Released: November 6, 2012
- Recorded: June 2012
- Studio: Tangerine Sound, Akron, Ohio
- Genre: Electronic; ambient
- Length: 42:11
- Label: Editions Mego

Emeralds chronology
| Does It Look Like I'm Here? (2010) | Just to Feel Anything (2012) |

Just to Feel Anything is a studio album by American instrumental band Emeralds. It was released on Editions Mego in 2012.

== Critical reception ==
Professional ratings
Aggregate scores
| Source | Rating |
|---|---|
| Metacritic | 71/100 |
Review scores
| Source | Rating |
| AllMusic | 3.5/5 stars |
| Beats Per Minute | 72% |
| Consequence of Sound | B |
| Exclaim! | 7/10 |
| The Phoenix | 2.5/4 stars |
| Pitchfork | 5.9/10 |
| PopMatters | 6/10 |
| Spin | 7/10 |
| Tiny Mix Tapes | 2.5/5 stars |

At Metacritic, which assigns a weighted average score out of 100 to reviews from mainstream critics, the album received an average score of 71, based on 20 reviews, indicating "generally favorable reviews".

Fred Thomas of AllMusic gave the album 3.5 stars out of 5, writing: "The amped-up chiptunes and film score moments are interesting enough, but the band sound their best when expanding on the lush tones and tension-laden improvisations they've been working on since the beginning." Mike Diver of BBC called the album "another essential Emeralds acquisition."

== Track listing ==
| No. | Title | Length |
|---|---|---|
| 1. | "Before Your Eyes" | 4:05 |
| 2. | "Adrenochrome" | 6:10 |
| 3. | "Through & Through" | 4:39 |
| 4. | "Everything Is Inverted" | 6:34 |
| 5. | "The Loser Keeps America Clean" | 3:39 |
| 6. | "Just to Feel Anything" | 8:53 |
| 7. | "Search for Me in the Wasteland" | 8:11 |
| Total length: | | 42:11 |

== Personnel ==
Credits adapted from liner notes.

Emeralds

- Mark McGuire – music, mixing, photography
- Steve Hauschildt – music, mixing, photography
- John Elliott – music, mixing

Technical personnel

- Andrew Veres – recording, mixing
- James Plotkin – mastering
- Mark Fell – artwork, typography
- Michael Pollard – layout assistance
