= Does It Look Like I'm Here? =

Studio album by Emeralds
- Released: June 8, 2010
- Recorded: 2009–2010
- Genre: Ambient; new-age; synthpop
- Length: 61:53
- Label: Editions Mego

Emeralds chronology
Emeralds (2009)	Does It Look Like I'm Here? (2010)	Just to Feel Anything (2012)

Professional ratings
Aggregate scores
Source	Rating
AnyDecentMusic?	8.0/10
Review scores
Source	Rating
AllMusic	4/5 stars
Drowned in Sound	8/10
Fact	3.5/5
Pitchfork	8.3/10 (2010); 8.7/10 (2023)
PopMatters	9/10
Resident Advisor	4.0/5
Uncut	4/5 stars

Does It Look Like I'm Here? is a 2010 album from the band Emeralds. It contains a mix of tracks previously released as 7-inch singles and new material. Pitchfork placed it at number 36 on its list of "The Top 50 Albums of 2010", and number 139 on its list of "The 200 Best Albums of the 2010s".

== Composition ==
Does It Look Like I'm Here? contains the same new age, krautrock and kosmische styles that were a part of their previous albums. However, in the words of journalist Derek Miller, it is much more "sharp", concise and pop music-influenced than their previous works. In categorising the album's overall style, critic Rick Anderson of Allmusic labeled it a "slightly uneasy borderland between ambient music and avant-garde experimentation." He compared the album's soundscape to that of 1970s electronic pop and synthesized classical music, consisting of slightly cheesy-sounding keyboard arpeggiations," "waveform generators," and "sweet-and-sour analog synth sounds." He called some of the record's material, including "Candy Shoppe," a more enthusiastic version of the works of Fripp & Eno.

Anderson compared "It Doesn't Arrive" to Brian Eno's Music for Airports.

Miller noted McGuire guitar work to be the focal point of the record's escapism aspect. An example is the "slow, wistful bliss" of "Candy Shoppe," a track with an atmosphere set by McGuire's guitar sounds and numerous synthesizer textures present in the background. The guitar also makes up a lot of space on "The Cycle of Abuse" until "cloudy drones" and groan voice whispers come into the track.

Featuring dark-toned synth arpeggios and frantic guitars, the songs "Double Helix" and the title track were compared by Miller to the works of Dominick Argento.

Songs like the rough-feeling "Summerdata," which Miller described as "a snowy blast of static like bits of data forging sound," recall the same noise music and drone music styles that were on the group's previous works. Anderson called it "intensely involving despite being largely arrhythmic."

As Miller described "Genetic," "It opens with a pulsating analog synth melody and ascendant vocals that sound like the closing hymn from a much distant church—resounding, rejoicing and mourning all at once—before McGuire's slippery, Gottsching-indebted guitar anchors its psychedelic swirl. And yet, even as it pushes into the dense wanderlusts of their past, there's a distinct concern for melody."

== Track listing ==
No.	Title	Length
1.	"Candy Shoppe"	4:45
2.	"The Cycle of Abuse"	4:59
3.	"Double Helix"	3:03
4.	"Science Center"	4:39
5.	"Genetic"	12:08
6.	"Goes By"	4:11
7.	"Does It Look Like I'm Here?"	7:29
8.	"Summerdata"	4:49
9.	"Shade"	4:27
10.	"It Doesn't Arrive"	3:35
11.	"Now You See Me"	3:40
12.	"Access Granted"	4:04

== Personnel ==
Adapted from the Does It Look Like I'm Here? liner notes.

Emeralds

- Mark McGuire – performer
- Steve Hauschildt – performer
- John Elliott – performer

Production and additional personnel

- James Plotkin – mastering
- Andreas [Lupo] Lubich – cutting engineer
- Jen Gomez – cover photography, layout
- Mike Pollard – layout
- Emeralds – artwork
