= No Answer =

No Answer may refer to:

- The Electric Light Orchestra (album), the 1971 debut album by the eponymous English rock band, released in the US as No Answer
- No Answer: Lower Floors, a 2013 studio album by American noise music group Wolf Eyes
- N/A

== See also ==
- Answer (disambiguation)
- No for an Answer, a musical play by Marc Blitzstein which premiered in 1941
- No case to answer, a term in British criminal law
