= Astray =

Astray may refer to:

== Literature ==
- Astray, a 2012 short story collection by Emma Donoghue

== Music ==
- Astray, an 1898 composition by Jean Sibelius
- Astray, a 1983 composition by Horațiu Rădulescu
- Astray (album), by Samiam, 2000
- "Astray", a song by I Am Kloot from the 2005 album Gods and Monsters (album)
- "Astray", a song by Mark McGuire from the 2014 album Along the Way
- "Astray", a song by Theatre of Tragedy from the 2009 album Forever Is the World

== See also ==
- Ashtray
- Stray (disambiguation)
