= Westshore Enforcement Bureau =

The Westshore Enforcement Bureau (WEB) is headquartered in Bay Village, Ohio. It was established in 1970. The organization provides services for high-risk arrest warrants, search warrants, barricaded suspects, and hostage rescues. It also seems to be involved in drug-enforcement.

The group does not maintain a presence on the Internet.

Member agencies of the group are:

- Fairview Police Department
- North Olmsted Police Department
- Lakewood Police Department
- North Olmsted Police Department
- Westlake Police Department
