= The Gag File =

Studio album by Aaron Dilloway
- Released: April 28, 2017
- Length: 35:38
- Label: Dais

Aaron Dilloway chronology
Modern Jester (2012)	The Gag File (2017)

The Gag File is the second studio album by American musician Aaron Dilloway. It was released on April 28, 2017, through Dais Records.

== Background ==
Aaron Dilloway is an American experimental/noise musician. After leaving the band Wolf Eyes, he has released multiple recordings and performed live as a solo artist. The Gag File is a follow-up to his solo studio album, Modern Jester (2012). In a 2017 interview, Dilloway said, "[The album] is mostly either loops I made of instruments or objects I recorded, or samples of old recordings." The album was released on April 28, 2017, through Dais Records.

== Critical reception ==
Professional ratings
Review scores
Source	Rating
AllMusic	4/5 stars
Exclaim!	7/10
Pitchfork	7.6/10
Tiny Mix Tapes	3.5/5 stars

Paul Simpson of AllMusic stated, "Mirroring his live performances, the album is filled with hideous monster-like vocals and disjointed rhythmic loops created from clanging buckets and other objects." He added, "There's also plenty of sudden, uncomfortable pausing and shifting, as well as an entire track that seems to be a processed recording of a casual house party, with lots of laughter, clinking glasses, and a soul record playing in the background." Bryon Hayes of Exclaim! commented that "The Gag File, on which Dilloway advances his standard operating procedures to deploy an arsenal of mangled eight-track loops and garbled vocal mumblings, is certainly rife with meritorious moments."

On July 3, 2017, The Quietus placed The Gag File at number 48 on its list of "The Best Albums of 2017 Thus Far".

=== Accolades ===
Year-end lists for The Gag File
Publication	List	Rank	Ref.
Fact	The 50 Best Albums of 2017	46	
The Wire	Top 50 Releases of 2017	39	

== Track listing ==
The Gag File track listing
No.	Title	Length
1.	"Ghost"	4:49
2.	"Karaoke with Cal"	6:13
3.	"Inhuman Form Reflected"	4:15
4.	"Born in a Maze"	4:46
5.	"It's Not Alright"	2:21
6.	"No Eye Sockets (for Otto & Sindy)"	4:25
7.	"Switch"	5:05
8.	"Shot Nerves"	3:41
Total length:		35:38

== Personnel ==
Credits adapted from liner notes.

- Aaron Dilloway – recording
- Nate Young – recording
- R. Nuuja – recording
- Thomas Buhl-Wiggers – recording
- Josh Bonati – mastering
