= John Olson (artist) =

American musician and artist

John Robert Olson
- Also known as: Inzane Johnny, Spykes
- Genres: Noise, Experimental rock, avant-garde
- Years active: 1992-present
- Labels: American Tapes, Hanson Records

John Olson is an American experimental musician, visual artist and writer from Detroit, Michigan. Olson is mostly known for his involvement with the noise rock band Wolf Eyes. His music is often made with handmade woodwind and brass instruments, various electronics, usually processed using effect units.

== Biography ==
In an interview with City Pulse, Olson said he was inspired to begin playing music after being invited to a punk gig in their hometown of Lansing, Michigan. In 1991, John Olson started the label American Tapes. Olson was a founding member of the band Universal Indians in 1993.

In 2000 he joined Wolf Eyes, after his bandmate from Universal Indians, Aaron Dilloway, invited him for a studio session.

In 2003, he started the duo Dead Machines along with his wife Tovah Olson (née O'Rourke). This went on to become Olson's most successful project after Wolf Eyes.

In 2016, he published Life Is a Ripoff, a book of 365 record reviews, on Third Man Books. The reviews included range from extreme metal to obscure Christian records.

Olson's Instagram account Inzanejohnny has gained popularity for its "chaotic shitposting", the leading alternative weekly newspaper Now to call Olson "some sort of bizarro influencer."

== American Tapes ==
Olson started the American Tapes label in 1991, which publishes Olson's own music and the music of other experimental artists. As of 2007, the label had over 700 releases. The label is known for the unique design of the tape cases, made of various media collages and abstract shapes and also their elaborate packaging in early days. Due to their limited runs of releases, the label became a target for collectors.
