= Sam Sheppard =

American neurosurgeon (1923–1970)

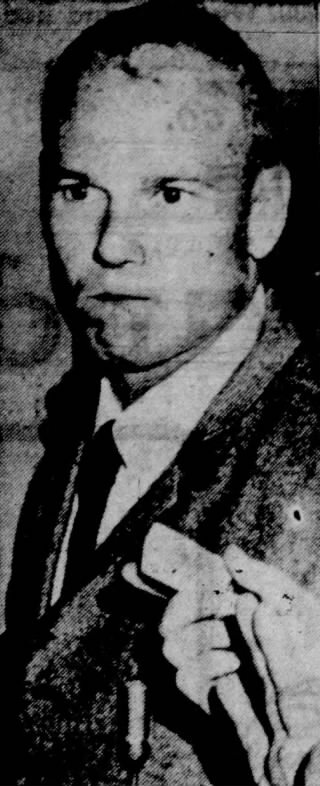
- Sheppard in 1964
- Born: Samuel Holmes Sheppard; December 29, 1923; Cleveland, Ohio, U.S.
- Died: April 6, 1970 (aged 46); Columbus, Ohio, U.S.
- Resting place: Forest Lawn Memorial Gardens (1970–1997); Knollwood Cemetery
- Education: Hanover College; Case Western Reserve; Los Angeles Osteopathic School of Physicians and Surgeons
- Occupations: Osteopath, professional wrestler
- Spouses: Marilyn Reese (m. 1945; died 1954) Ariane Tebbenjohanns (m. 1964; div. 1969) Colleen Strickland (m. 1969)
- Children: 1
- Conviction: Murder (overturned)
- Penalty: Life imprisonment (overturned)

Samuel Holmes Sheppard (December 29, 1923 – April 6, 1970) was an American osteopathic physician. He was convicted of the 1954 murder of his pregnant wife, Marilyn Reese Sheppard, but the conviction was eventually overturned by the U.S. Supreme Court, which cited a "carnival atmosphere" at the trial. Sheppard was acquitted at a retrial in 1966.

== Early life and education ==
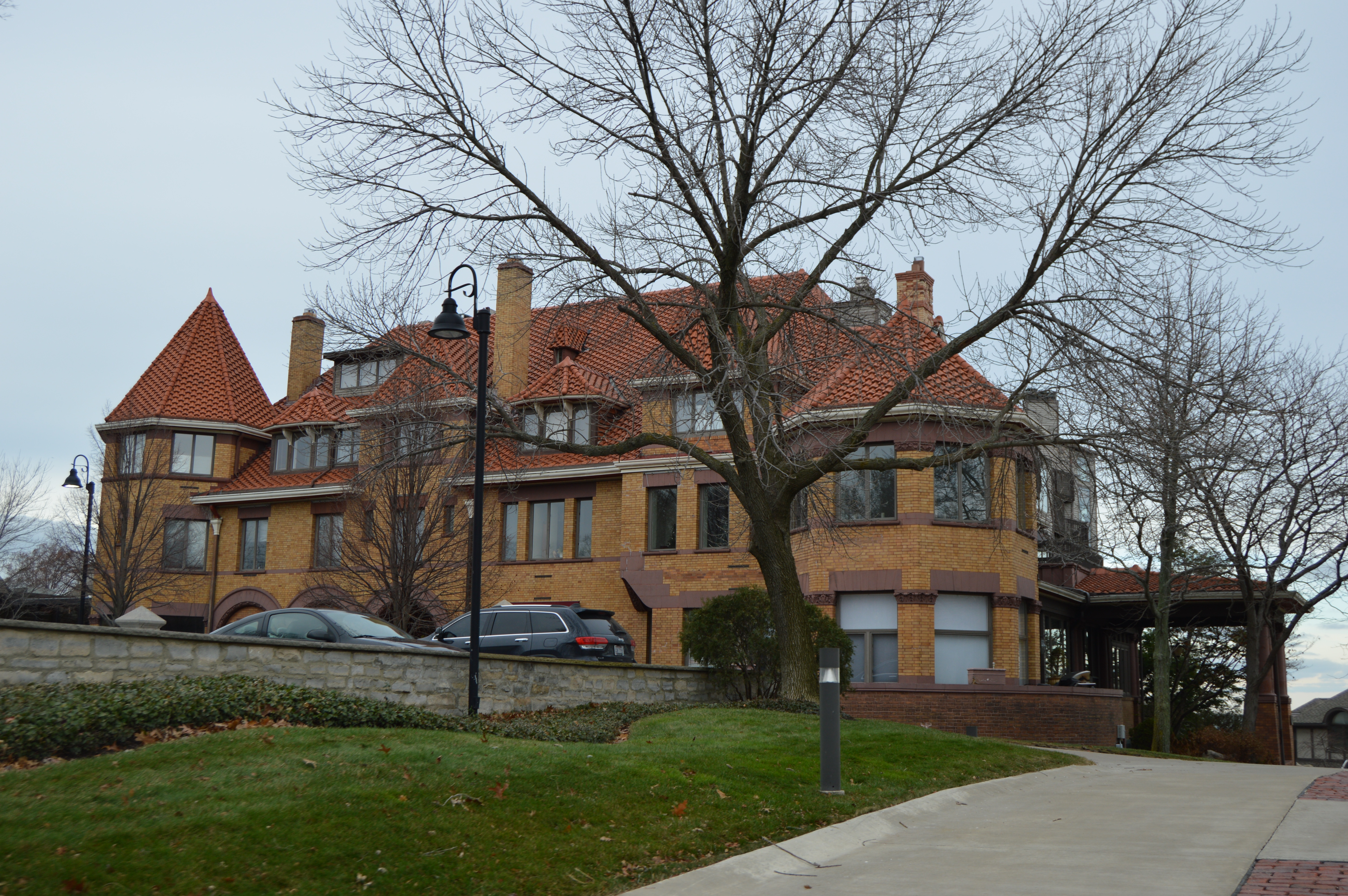
Bay View Hospital

Samuel Sheppard was born in Cleveland, Ohio, the youngest of three sons of Richard Allen Sheppard, D.O. He attended Cleveland Heights High School where he was active in American football, basketball, and track; he was class president for three years.

Sheppard met his future wife, Marilyn Reese, while in high school. Although several small Ohio colleges offered him athletic scholarships, Sheppard chose to follow the lead of his father and older brothers and pursued a career in osteopathic medicine. He enrolled at Hanover College in Indiana to study pre-osteopathic medical courses, then took supplementary courses at the Case Institute of Technology in Cleveland during the Summer of 1943. Sheppard finished his medical education at the Los Angeles Osteopathic School of Physicians and Surgeons (now University of California, Irvine School of Medicine) and was awarded the Doctor of Osteopathic Medicine (D.O.) medical degree.

Sheppard completed his internship and a residency in neurosurgery at Los Angeles County General Hospital.

He married Marilyn Reese on February 21, 1945, in Hollywood, California. A few years later he returned to Ohio and joined his father's growing medical practice at Bay View Hospital.

== Murder of Marilyn Reese Sheppard ==
On the night of Saturday, July 3, 1954, Sheppard and Marilyn were entertaining neighbors at their home in Bay Village, Ohio, on Lake Erie. While they were watching the 1945 movie Strange Holiday on television, Samuel Sheppard fell asleep on the daybed in the living room, and Marilyn Sheppard led the neighbors out.

In the early morning hours of July 4, 1954, Marilyn Sheppard was bludgeoned to death in her bed with an unknown instrument. The bedroom was covered with blood spatter and drops of blood were found on floors throughout the house. Some items from the house, including Sam Sheppard's wristwatch, keychain and key, and fraternity ring, appeared to have been stolen. They were later found in a canvas bag in shrubbery behind the house. According to Sheppard, he was sleeping soundly on a daybed when he heard the cries from his wife. He ran upstairs where he saw a "white biped form" in the bedroom and then he was knocked unconscious. When he awoke, he saw the person downstairs, chased the intruder out of the house down to the beach where they tussled and Sheppard was knocked unconscious again.

At 5:40 am, a neighbor received an urgent phone call from Sheppard who pleaded for him to come to his home. When the neighbor and his wife arrived, Sheppard was found shirtless and his pants were wet with a bloodstain on the knee. Authorities arrived shortly thereafter. Sheppard seemed disoriented and in shock. The family dog was not heard barking to indicate an intruder, and their seven-year-old son, Sam Reese "Chip" Sheppard, was asleep in the adjacent bedroom throughout the incident.

== First trial ==
=== Media ===
Sheppard's trial began October 18, 1954, and lasted nine weeks. The murder investigation and the trial were notable for the extensive publicity. Some newspapers and other media in Ohio were accused of bias against Sheppard and inflammatory coverage of the case, and were criticized for immediately labeling him the only viable suspect. A federal judge later criticized the media, "If ever there was a trial by newspaper, this is a perfect example. And the most insidious example was the Cleveland Press. For some reason that newspaper took upon itself the role of accuser, judge, and jury."

It appeared that the local media influenced the investigators. On July 21, 1954, the Cleveland Press ran a front-page editorial titled "Why No Inquest? Do It Now, Dr. Gerber", which called for a public inquest. Hours later, Dr. Samuel Gerber, the coroner investigating the murder, announced that he would hold an inquest the next day. The Cleveland Press ran another front-page editorial titled "Why Isn't Sam Sheppard in Jail?" on July 30, which was titled in later editions, "Quit Stalling and Bring Him In!" That night, Sheppard was arrested for a police interrogation.

The local media ran salacious front-page stories inflammatory to Sheppard that contained no supporting facts or were later disproved. During the trial, a popular radio show broadcast a report about a New York City woman who claimed to be his mistress and the mother of his illegitimate child. Since the jury was not sequestered, two of the jurors admitted to the judge that they heard the broadcast but the judge did not dismiss them. From interviews with some of the jurors years later, it is likely that jurors were contaminated by the press before the trial and perhaps during it. The U.S. Supreme Court later stated that the trial was surrounded by a "carnival atmosphere".

=== Susan Hayes ===
Susan Hayes was a 24-year-old laboratory technician at Bayview Hospital in Bay Village, who had an affair with Sheppard. The prosecution attempted to show that Hayes was the motive for murder.

=== Defense strategy ===
Sheppard's attorney, William Corrigan, argued that Sheppard had severe injuries and that these injuries were inflicted by the intruder. Corrigan based his argument on the report made by neurosurgeon Charles Elkins who examined Sheppard and found he had suffered a cervical concussion, nerve injury, many absent or weak reflexes (most notably on the left side of his body), and injury in the region of the second cervical vertebra in the back of the neck. Elkins stated that it was impossible to fake or simulate the missing reflex responses.

The defense further argued the crime scene was extremely bloody, yet the only blood evidence appearing on Sheppard was a bloodstain on his trousers. Corrigan also argued two of Marilyn's teeth had been broken and that the pieces had been pulled from her mouth, suggesting she had possibly bitten her assailant. He told the jury that Sheppard had no open wounds. Some observers have questioned the accuracy of claims that Marilyn Sheppard lost her teeth while biting her attacker, arguing that her missing teeth are more consistent with the severe beating she received to her face and skull. However, criminologist Paul L. Kirk later said that if the beating had broken Mrs. Sheppard's teeth, pieces would have been found inside her mouth, and her lips would have been severely damaged, which was not the case.

Sheppard took the stand in his own defense, testifying that he had been sleeping downstairs on a daybed when he awoke to his wife's screams.

I think that she cried or screamed my name once or twice, during which time I ran upstairs, thinking that she might be having a reaction similar to convulsions that she had in the early days of her pregnancy. I charged into our room and saw a form with a light garment, I believe, at that time grappling with something or someone. During this short period I could hear loud moans or groaning sounds and noises. I was struck down. It seems like I was hit from behind somehow but had grappled this individual from in front or generally in front of me. I was apparently knocked out. The next thing I knew, I was gathering my senses while coming to a sitting position next to the bed, my feet toward the hallway. ... I looked at my wife, I believe I took her pulse and felt that she was gone. I believe that I thereafter instinctively or subconsciously ran into my youngster's room next door and somehow determined that he was all right, I am not sure how I determined this. After that, I thought that I heard a noise downstairs, seemingly in the front eastern portion of the house.

Sheppard ran back downstairs and chased what he described as a "bushy-haired intruder" or "form" down to the Lake Erie beach below his home, before being knocked out again. The defense called eighteen character witnesses for Sheppard, and two witnesses who said that they had seen a bushy-haired man near the Sheppard home on the day of the crime.

=== Verdict ===
On December 21, after deliberating for four days, the jury found Sheppard guilty of second-degree murder. He was sentenced to life in prison.

=== Family deaths ===
On January 7, 1955, shortly after his conviction, the incarcerated Sheppard was told that his mother, Ethel Sheppard, had died from a self-inflicted gunshot. Eleven days later, Sheppard's father, Richard Sheppard, died of a bleeding gastric ulcer and stomach cancer. Sheppard was permitted to attend both funerals but was required to wear handcuffs.

On February 13, 1963, while F. Lee Bailey was pursuing the appeals process, Sheppard's former father-in-law, Thomas S. Reese, died by suicide in an East Cleveland, Ohio, motel. Reese's wife had died in 1929 when their daughter Marilyn was in grade school.

=== Incarceration ===
In 1959, Sheppard voluntarily took part in cancer studies by the Sloan Kettering Institute for Cancer Research, allowing live cancer cells to be injected into his body.

== Appeals and retrial ==
=== Appeals ===
Sheppard's attorney William Corrigan spent six years making appeals but all were rejected. On July 30, 1961, Corrigan died and F. Lee Bailey took over as Sheppard's chief counsel. Bailey's petition for a writ of habeas corpus was granted on July 15, 1964, by a United States district court judge who called the 1954 trial a "mockery of justice" that shredded Sheppard's Fourteenth Amendment right to due process. The State of Ohio was ordered to release Sheppard on bond and gave the prosecutor 60 days to bring charges against him; otherwise the case would be dismissed permanently. The State of Ohio appealed the ruling to the U.S. Court of Appeals Court for the Sixth Circuit, which on March 4, 1965, reversed the federal judge's ruling. Bailey appealed to the U.S. Supreme Court, which agreed to hear the case in Sheppard v. Maxwell. On June 6, 1966, the Supreme Court, by an 8-to-1 vote, struck down the murder conviction. The decision noted, among other factors, that a "carnival atmosphere" had permeated the trial, and that the trial judge, Edward J. Blythin, who had died in 1958, was biased against Sheppard because Blythin had refused to sequester the jury, did not order the jury to ignore and disregard media reports of the case, and when speaking to newspaper columnist Dorothy Kilgallen shortly before the trial started said, "Well, he's guilty as hell. There's no question about it."

Sheppard served 10 years of his sentence. Three days after his 1964 release, he married Ariane Tebbenjohanns, a German divorcee who had corresponded with him during his imprisonment. The two had been engaged since January 1963. Tebbenjohanns endured her own bout of controversy shortly after the engagement had been announced, confirming that her half-sister was Magda Ritschel, the wife of Nazi propaganda chief Joseph Goebbels. Tebbenjohanns emphasized that she held no Nazi views. On October 7, 1969, Sheppard and Tebbenjohanns divorced.

=== Retrial ===
Jury selection began October 24, 1966, and opening statements began eight days later. Media interest in the trial remained high, but this jury was sequestered. The prosecutor presented essentially the same case as was presented twelve years earlier. Bailey aggressively sought to discredit each prosecution witness during cross-examination. When Coroner Samuel Gerber testified about a murder weapon that he described as a "surgical weapon", Bailey led Gerber to admit that they never found a murder weapon and had nothing to tie Sheppard to the murder. In his closing argument, Bailey scathingly dismissed the prosecution's case against Sheppard as "ten pounds of hogwash in a five-pound bag".

Unlike the original trial, neither Sheppard nor Susan Hayes took the stand, a strategy that proved to be successful. After deliberating for 12 hours, the jury returned on November 16 with a "not guilty" verdict. The trial was important to Bailey's rise to prominence among American criminal defense lawyers. It was during this trial that Paul Kirk presented the putative (Note: Recent studies cast significant doubt on the accuracy of blood spatter analysis.) blood spatter evidence he collected in Sheppard's home in 1955. Kirk used the blood evidence to suggest that the murderer was left-handed, unlike Sheppard, which proved crucial to his acquittal.

Three weeks after the verdict, Sheppard appeared as a guest on the December 7, 1966 episode of The Tonight Show Starring Johnny Carson.

After his acquittal, Sheppard worked with ghostwriter Bill Levy to write the book Endure and Conquer, which presented his side of the case and discussed his years in prison. Levy felt conflicted about collaborating with Sheppard because of his belief that Sheppard had committed the crime.

== Professional wrestling career ==
Sam Sheppard
Personal information
- Born: Samuel Holmes Sheppard; December 29, 1923 Cleveland, Ohio, United States
- Died: April 6, 1970 (aged 46) Columbus, Ohio, United States

Professional wrestling career
- Ring name: Sam Sheppard
- Billed weight: 195 lb (88 kg)
- Trained by: George Strickland
- Debut: August 1969

Sheppard's friend and soon-to-be father-in-law, professional wrestler George Strickland, introduced him to wrestling and trained him for it. He debuted in August 1969 at the age of 45 as "Killer" Sam Sheppard, wrestling Wild Bill Scholl.

Sheppard wrestled over 40 matches before his death in April 1970, including a number of tag team bouts with Strickland as his partner. His notoriety made him a strong draw.

During his wrestling career, Sheppard used his anatomical knowledge to develop a new submission hold, that he called the "Mandibular Nerve Pinch". The maneuver would go on to be renamed the "Mandible Claw" and utilized and popularized by professional wrestler Mankind in 1996.

== Late medical practice, remarriage, and death ==
After his release from prison, Sheppard opened a medical office in the Columbus suburb of Gahanna, Ohio. On May 10, 1968, Sheppard was granted surgical privileges at the Youngstown Osteopathic Hospital, but "[his] skills as a surgeon had deteriorated, and much of the time he was impaired by alcohol". Five days after he was granted privileges, he performed a discectomy on a woman and accidentally cut an artery; the patient died the next day. On August 6, he nicked the right iliac artery on a 29-year-old patient who bled to death internally. Sheppard resigned from the hospital staff a few months later after wrongful death suits had been filed by the patients' families.

Six months before his death, Sheppard married Colleen Strickland. Toward the end of his life, Sheppard was reportedly drinking "as much as two fifths of liquor a day" (1.5 liters). On April 6, 1970, Sheppard was found dead in his home in Columbus, Ohio. Early reports indicated that Sheppard died of liver failure. The official cause of death was Wernicke encephalopathy (a type of brain damage associated with advanced alcoholism). He was buried in Forest Lawn Memorial Gardens in Columbus.

=== 1997 DNA test ===
Sheppard's body remained buried until September 1997 when he was exhumed for DNA testing as part of the lawsuit brought by his son to clear his father's name. His attorney stated that the DNA testing absolved Sheppard of the murder, because there was blood at the murder scene that belonged to neither him nor his wife. After the tests, the body was cremated, and the ashes were interred in a mausoleum at Knollwood Cemetery in Mayfield Heights, Ohio, along with those of his murdered wife, Marilyn.

== Civil trial for wrongful imprisonment ==
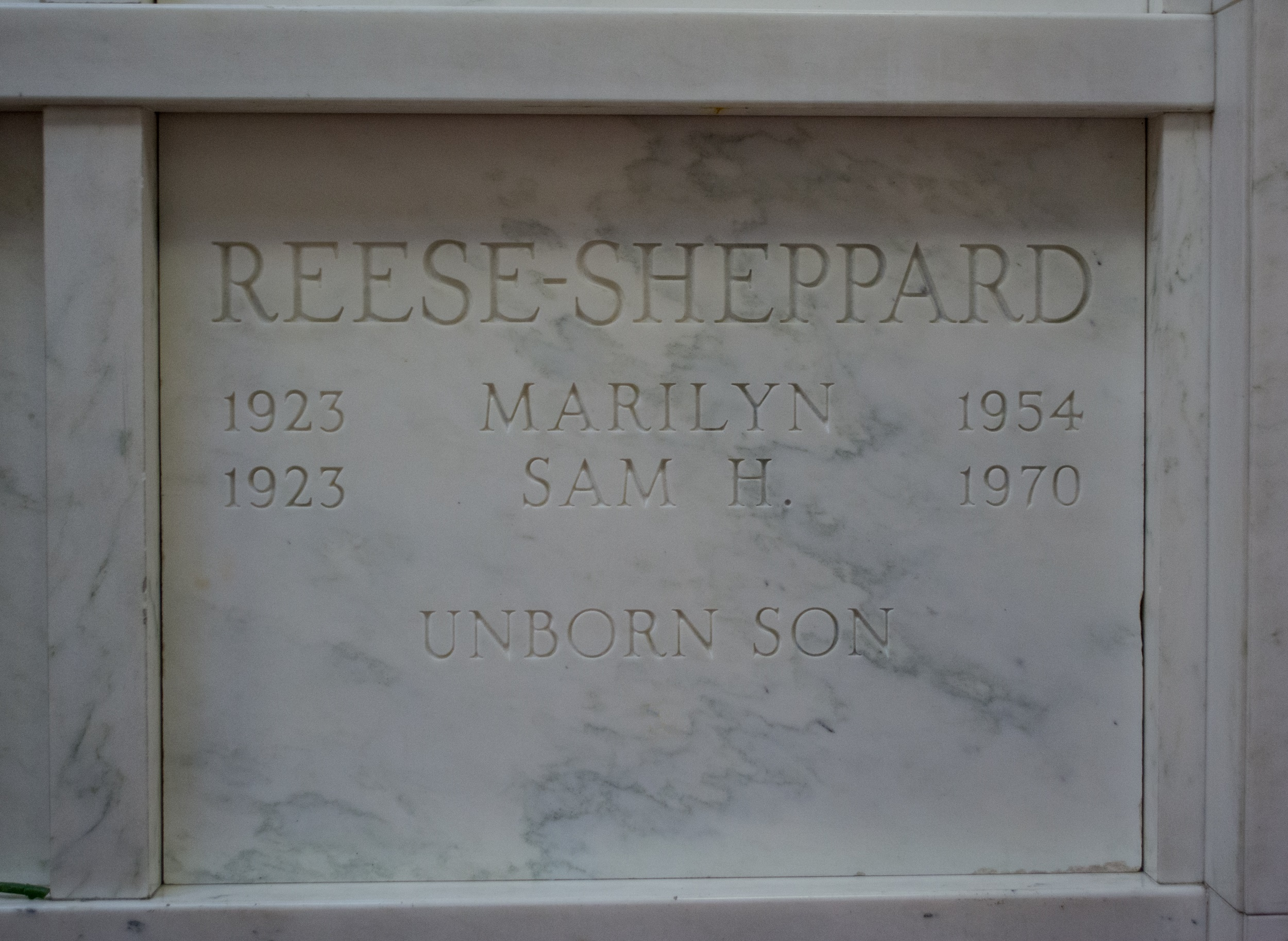
Sam and Marilyn Sheppard crypt at Knollwood Cemetery

Sheppard's son, Samuel Reese Sheppard, has devoted considerable time and effort towards attempting to clear his father's reputation.

In 1999, Alan Davis, a lifelong friend of Sheppard and administrator of his estate, sued the State of Ohio in the Cuyahoga County Court of Common Pleas for Sheppard's wrongful imprisonment. The case was heard before Judge Ron Suster.

By order of the court, Marilyn Sheppard's body was exhumed, in part to determine if the fetus she was carrying had been fathered by Sheppard. Terry Gilbert, an attorney retained by the Sheppard family, told the media that "the fetus in this case had previously been autopsied", a fact that had never previously been disclosed. This, Gilbert argued, raised questions about the coroner's office in the original case possibly concealing pertinent evidence. Due to the passage of time on the fetus's tissues, paternity could not be established.

=== Richard Eberling ===
During the civil trial, plaintiff attorney Terry Gilbert contended that Richard Eberling, an occasional handyman and window washer at the Sheppard home, was the likeliest suspect in Marilyn's murder. Eberling found Marilyn attractive and he was very familiar with the layout of the Sheppard home.

In 1959, detectives were questioning Richard Eberling about various burglaries in the area. Eberling confessed to the burglaries and showed the detectives his loot, which included two rings that belonged to Marilyn Sheppard. Eberling stole the rings in 1958, a few years after the murder, from Sam Sheppard's brother's house, taken from a box marked "Personal Property of Marilyn Sheppard". In subsequent questioning, Eberling admitted his blood was at the crime scene of Marilyn Sheppard. He stated that he cut his finger while washing windows just prior to the murder and bled while on the premises. As part of the investigation, Eberling took a polygraph test with questions about the murder of Marilyn. The polygraph examiner concluded that Eberling did not show deception in his answers, although the polygraph results were evaluated by other experts years later who found that it was either inconclusive or Eberling was deceptive.

In his testimony in the 2000 civil lawsuit, Bailey stated that he rejected Eberling as a suspect in 1966 because "I thought he passed a good polygraph test." When it was presented to Bailey that an independent polygraph expert said Eberling either murdered Marilyn or had knowledge of who did, Bailey stated that he probably would have presented Eberling as a suspect in the 1966 retrial.

DNA evidence, which was not available in the two murder trials, played an important role in the civil trial. DNA analysis of blood at the crime scene showed that there was presence of blood from a third person, other than Marilyn and Sheppard.

With regard to tying the blood to Eberling, the DNA analysis that was allowed to be admitted to the trial was inconclusive. A plaintiff DNA expert was 90% confident that one of the blood spots belonged to Richard Eberling but, according to the rules of the court, this was not admissible. The defense argued that the blood evidence had been tainted in the years since it was collected, and that an important blood spot on the closet door in Marilyn Sheppard's room potentially matched 83% of the adult white population. The defense also pointed out that the results in 1955 from the older blood typing technique, that the blood collected from the closet door was Type O, while Eberling's blood type was Type A.

Throughout his life, Richard Eberling was associated with women who had suspicious deaths and he was convicted of murdering Ethel May Durkin, a wealthy, elderly widow who died without any immediate family. Durkin's 1984 murder in Lakewood, Ohio, was uncovered when a court-appointed review of the woman's estate revealed that Eberling, Durkin's guardian and executor, had failed to execute her final wishes, which included stipulations on her burial.

Durkin's body was exhumed and additional injuries were discovered in the autopsy that did not match Eberling's previous claims of in-house accidents, including a fall down a staircase in her home. In subsequent legal action, both Eberling and his partner, Obie Henderson, were found guilty in Durkin's death. Coincidentally, both of Durkin's sisters, Myrtle Fray and Sarah Belle Farrow, had died under suspicious circumstances as well. Fray was killed after being "savagely" beaten about the head and face and then strangled; Farrow died following a fall down the basement steps in the home she shared with Durkin in 1970, a fall in which she broke both legs and both arms.

Although Eberling denied any criminal involvement in the murder of Marilyn Sheppard, Kathy Wagner Dyal, who worked alongside Eberling in caring for Ethel May Durkin, also testified that Eberling had confessed to her in 1983. A fellow convict also reported that Eberling confessed to the crime. The defense called into question the credibility of both witnesses during the 2000 civil trial. Eberling died in an Ohio prison in 1998, where he was serving a life sentence for the 1984 murder of Ethel May Durkin.

=== Verdict ===
After twelve weeks of trial, 76 witnesses, and hundreds of exhibits, the case went to the eight-person civil jury. The jury deliberated just three hours on April 12, 2000, before returning a unanimous verdict that Samuel Reese Sheppard had failed to prove by a preponderance of the evidence that his father had been wrongfully imprisoned.

=== Invalidation of wrongful imprisonment claim ===
On February 22, 2002, the Eighth District Court of Appeals ruled unanimously that the civil case should not have gone to the jury, on the grounds that the statute of limitations had expired, and that a claim for wrongful imprisonment abated with Sam Sheppard's death. In August 2002, the Supreme Court of Ohio declined to review the appeals court's decision.

=== Additional suspect ===
A 2002 book theorizes that Marilyn Sheppard was murdered by James Call, an Air Force deserter who passed through Cleveland on a multi-state crime spree at the relevant time. Pages 444–451 show multiple, comparative photographs of Major Call's Luger pistol with the blood-stained pillowcase of Marilyn Sheppard. During the original trial, the blood stain patterns were suspected of having been made by a surgical instrument, which F. Lee Bailey disproved during the 1966 retrial.

== Records from the case ==
In 2012, William Mason, then Cuyahoga County Prosecutor, designated the Cleveland–Marshall College of Law Library at Cleveland State University as the repository for records and other materials relating to the Sheppard case. The law school has digitized the material, consisting of over 60 boxes of photographs, recordings, and trial exhibits, and posted portions of it online through the school's institutional repository.

== In popular culture ==
=== In literature ===
- The 2010 novel Mr. Peanut by Adam Ross features Sam Sheppard as a New York City detective investigating a woman's death and recounting the details of his wife's murder.
- The novel Crooked River Burning by Mark Winegardner features the Sheppard murder trial and ends with an epilogue of Sheppard's wrestling days and death.
- Helter Skelter by Vincent Bugliosi with Curt Gentry several times compares the media fanaticism of the Manson Family murders trial to that of the Sheppard case.
- Max Allan Collins's 2020 novel Do No Harm is a fictional account of a private investigator investigating the Sheppard case at the request of Eliot Ness and Erle Stanley Gardner.

=== In film ===
- The 1970 movie The Lawyer is a courtroom drama based on the Sheppard murder trial.
- The 1993 film The Fugitive, an adaptation of the 1964 television series, is sometimes said to be loosely inspired by the Sam Sheppard case, but series creator Roy Huggins consistently, adamantly and unequivocally denied that there was any creative connection between Sheppard's case and The Fugitive.
- The 2021 Hallmark Movies & Mysteries movie Reunited and It Feels So Deadly features the Sheppard Murder trial in the Real Murders Club group.

=== Television ===
- The television series The Fugitive and the 1993 film of the same name have been cited as being loosely based on Sheppard's story. This claim has always been denied by their creators.
- Guilty or Innocent: The Sam Sheppard Murder Case (1975), starring George Peppard, is a television movie about this case.
- My Father's Shadow: The Sam Sheppard Story (1998), starring Peter Strauss, is a television movie about this case.
- The Nova television series episode "NOVA: The Killer's Trail – The Story of Dr. Sam Sheppard" includes a reconstruction of the Sheppard house, examines previously ignored evidence, and offers the opinions of forensic experts.
- The educational television series Our Living Bill of Rights, produced by Encyclopædia Britannica Films, covers the Sheppard trial in the episode "Free Press vs. Trial By Jury: The Sheppard Case" (also called "Free Press vs Fair Trial By Jury"). The program contains documentary film footage, interviews with Sheppard and Bailey and a dramatization of the activity in the Sheppard home at the time of the murder. The program may be viewed on this site: http://www.historicfilms.com/tapes/15618 (the opening and closing title sequences are omitted, and is entirely in black and white – the original contained some color footage).
- The BBC Four documentary series Catching History's Criminals: The Forensics Story episode (S01E02; 2015) "Traces of Guilt" examined the case, with particular regard to bloodstain evidence and bloodstain pattern analysis.
- The Investigation Discovery series A Crime to Remember details the evidence and Sam Sheppard's story in the Season 3 episode "The Wrong Man", first aired December 15, 2015.

== See also ==
- List of premature professional wrestling deaths

== Bibliography ==
- Bailey, F. Lee (1971). The Defense Never Rests. New York: Stein and Day Publishers.
- Cooper, Cynthia; Sheppard, Samuel Reese (1995). Mockery of Justice. Lebanon, N.H.: Northeastern University Press. ISBN 1555532411.
- DeSario, Jack P.; Mason, William D. (2003). Dr. Sam Sheppard on Trial: The Prosecutors and the Marilyn Sheppard Murder. Kent State University Press. ISBN 0-873-38770-8.
- Holmes, Paul (1961). The Sheppard Murder Case. New York: David McKay Company, Inc.
- Neff, James (2001). The Wrong Man:The Final Verdict on the Dr. Sam Sheppard Murder Case. New York: Random House. ISBN 0679457194.
- Pollack, Jack Harrison (1972). "Dr. Sam: An American Tragedy". Chicago: Henry Regnery Company.
- Seltzer, Louis B. (1956). "The Years Were Good". Cleveland, Ohio: The World Publishing Company.
- Sheppard, Dr. Sam (1966). Endure and Conquer. Cleveland, Ohio: The World Publishing Company.
- Sheppard, Dr. Stephen (1964). My Brother's Keeper. New York: David McKay Company. Inc.
- Tanay, Emanuel (2011). American Legal Injustice: Behind the Scenes With an Expert Witness. Lanham, Md.: Jason Aronson. ISBN 9780765707765.
- Warnes, Kathy (2004). "The Sam Sheppard Case: Do Three Trials Equal Justice?". In Bailey, Frankie Y.; Chermak, Steven M. (eds.). Famous American Crimes and Trials. Westport, Conn.: Praeger. ISBN 9780275983338.
