= Nautical Almanac (band) =

American noise music group

Nautical Almanac was a noise music group based in Baltimore, in the state of Maryland in the United States, with a rotating membership fronted by Carly Ptak and Twig Harper. The group was formed in 1994 and disbanded in 2016 following their final performance.

== History ==
Nautical Almanac first organized in Ann Arbor Michigan in 1994 (the year Harper and Ptak met) from the same experimental music scene which produced Wolf Eyes, Universal Indians, and Andrew W.K.

Nautical Almanac was created after Harper's infamous band Scheme was dissolved. Nautical Almanac's first shows revolved around guerrilla performances and consisted of general open door member policy. In 1996, Nautical Almanac released its self-titled debut LP on Hanson Records. By then the band's lineup solidly consisted of Nathan Young, Sol Meltzer, and Twig Harper. The following year those members were involved in a police riot which was followed by unwarranted house surveillance and raids looking for Twig Harper which caused him to move to Chicago with Carly Ptak. At this point Ptak and Harper furthered Nautical's research in DIY electronics, circuit bending, record cutting, and costumed performance.

From 1997 to 2001, Ptak and Harper operated a junk-resale-antique store on Division Street named The Mystery Spot. In 2001, they relocated to Baltimore, Maryland buying a store front with two abandoned floors above. Right away they knocked a hole in a wall and began squatting the top two floors and doing repairs to the neglected space. The building was named Tarantula Hill and hosted many touring and local experimental performances, the first ever show held there featured Lightning Bolt, Forcefield, Neon Hunk, and Spread Eagle, Ptak's band with Misty Martinez. During this time the HERESEE record label was created and Nautical Almanac toured the US and Europe extensively.

In 2004, Nautical Almanac was reformed as a Noise-Rock band with the inclusion of Max Eisenberg on drums, electronics and vocals. Three months of touring and the LP Cover the Earth featured this line-up.

In March 2006, shortly before Harper's performance at New York's No Fun Fest, the first floor of their building and much of their equipment and archives were lost in a mysterious fire. The outpouring of support was tremendous: The True Vine record shop hosted a series of benefit concerts, Ecstatic Peace released a double CD compilation, and countless individual and arts collectives from across the world sent support. During the next year, they worked on gutting the bottom floor with help of volunteers and worked with Baltimore City to secure a loan to get the building legally up to code. The repairs were finished by the middle of 2007 after which Nautical Almanac completed a 20-day tour of N. America and performed and traveled in Peru and Bolivia. After the fire, Ptak moved from playing instruments to playing light and their show became even more all-encompassing.

In 2007, Ptak opened a hypnotherapy office and continues her research into subtle energy and radionics, while, in 2012, Harper opened a float tank in the Tarantula Hill space and has pioneered research into buccal salvia divinorum.

Nautical Almanac gave their final performance in August 2016 at Baltimore's Fields Festival, and subsequently disbanded.

== Select discography ==
=== 1996 ===
- "Nautical Almanac" LP (Hanson Records)
- "Nautical Almanac" Cassette (Hanson Records)
- "Isolation Muzak" Cassette (Hanson Records)

=== 1997 ===
- "Death of Nautical Almanac" Cassette (Hanson Records)

=== 1998 ===
- Tour Only Lathe-cut CD (With Zeek Sheck) (Self-released)

=== 1999 ===
- Split LP with Wolf Eyes (Hanson Records)
- Tour-Only Lathe Cut CD (With Rubber-(o)-Cement and Wolf Eyes) (Self-released)

=== 2000 ===
- "0000 Yearbook" Book (With Wolf Eyes) (Hanson Records)
- "Transcriptedvisions" LP (Hanson Records)

=== 2001 ===
- "Two Mutants or Two Mongrels" CD-R (American Tapes)
- "Live From Mexington, Kansas 9/29/01" CD-R (With Meerk Puffy (Gods of Tundra)

=== 2002 ===
- "Nauticalamanac" Cassette (Heresee)
- "Rejerks Vol. 1" CD-R (Heresee)
- "The Twilight Zone" Cassette (With Dead Machines) (American Tapes)
- "Untitled" CD-R (With Meerk Puffy) (Veglia Records)

=== 2003 ===
- "Cisum" LP (Heresee)
- "19994-20003" Video (Heresee)
- "Kool Kreek & The Chaser Gang" Cassette (With Local Disorder) (American Tapes)
- "We Want War" Tour-only CD-R with Lathe Edge (Heresee)

=== 2004 ===
- "Cleanse Bathe" 10" Lathe Cut on Lacquer (Heresee)
- "Handcut Record Transfers" CD-R with Record Edge (Heresee)
- "Rejerks Vol. 3" CD-R (Heresee)
- Split LP with Vertonen (Crippled Intellect Productions / Scratch And Sniff Entertainment)
- Split 7" Lathe with Cotton Museum (Hanson Records / MUET / IHTR)
- "We're Stupid, And So Are You" 3" CD-R (Fargone Records)

=== 2005 ===
- "Rooting For The Microbes" CD (Load Records)
- "Cover The Earth" LP/CD-R (Heresee)
- "Something" Euro tour-only CD-R (8mm)
- "Intuitive American Esoteric" Twig Harper solo, 3 volume LP (Heresee, etc.)
