= Bay View Hospital =

- U.S. National Register of Historic Places
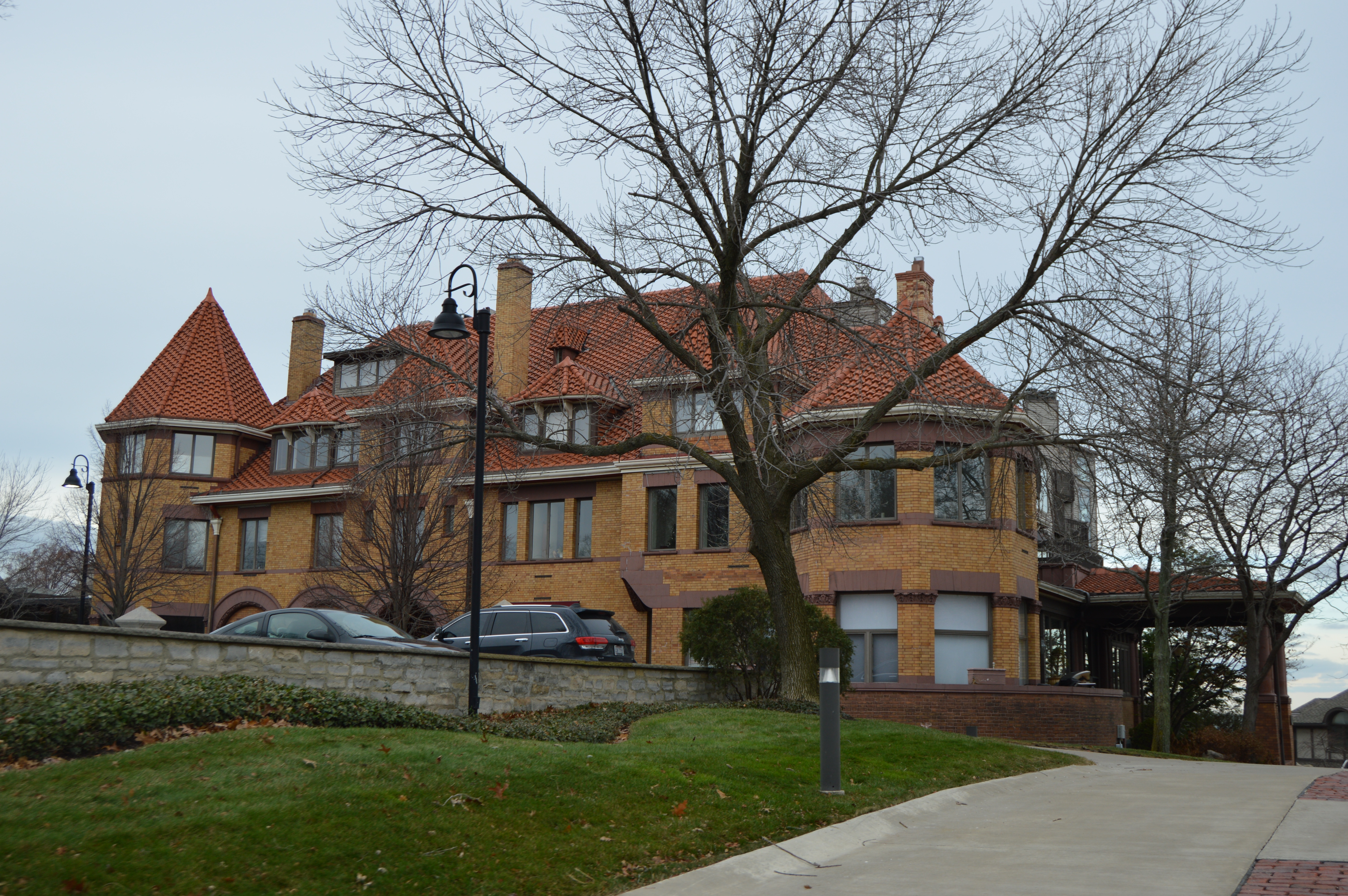
- Front of the hospital

- Location within Ohio Location within the United States
- Location: 23200 Lake Road, Bay Village, Ohio
- Coordinates: 41°28′56″N 81°52′36″W
- Area: less than one acre
- Built: 1874
- Architect: Colburn & Barnum
- Architectural style: Shingle Style, Romanesque
- NRHP reference No.: 74001428
- Added to NRHP: August 27, 1974

Bay View Hospital was a hospital located on 23200 Lake Rd in Bay Village, Ohio. The site was originally home to the Washington Lawrence mansion in the late 1800s until 1948 when it was sold to Dr. Richard Sheppard. It served as an osteopathic medical center from 1948 until it closed its doors on March 1, 1981. It was added to the National Register of Historic Places on August 27, 1974. The former Washington Lawrence mansion (Bay View Hospital) is now part of Cashelmara Luxury Condos. Beginning in the early 1980s, construction began on condos as well as remodeling of the mansion to use as condos.

The Osteopathic Hospital was opened in 1948 by the Sheppard family; the hospital made headlines in 1954 when Dr. Sam Sheppard was accused of killing his pregnant wife.
