= Burned Mind =

Studio album by Wolf Eyes
- Released: September 28, 2004
- Recorded: October 2003–July 2004
- Genre: Noise
- Length: 42:22
- Label: Sub Pop

Wolf Eyes chronology
Dead Hills (2002)	Burned Mind (2004)	Human Animal (2006)

Professional ratings
Aggregate scores
Source	Rating
Metacritic	70/100
Review scores
Source	Rating
AllMusic	4/5 stars
Pitchfork Media	(8.0/10)

Burned Mind is an album by Wolf Eyes, released on September 28, 2004, by Sub Pop. It is named after one of the members in fellow noise group Smegma.

== Track listing ==
1. "Dead in a Boat" – 1:38
2. "Stabbed in the Face" – 3:32
3. "Reaper's Gong" – 1:46
4. "Village Oblivia" – 4:02
5. "Urine Burn" – 0:47
6. "Rattlesnake Shake" – 4:56
7. "Burned Mind" – 4:12
8. "Ancient Delay" – 2:26
9. "Black Vomit" – 8:14
10. "[silence]" – 4:33
11. "[silence]" – 1:32
12. "[silence]" – 1:01
13. Untitled – 3:38
