= Wolf Eyes =

American experimental music group

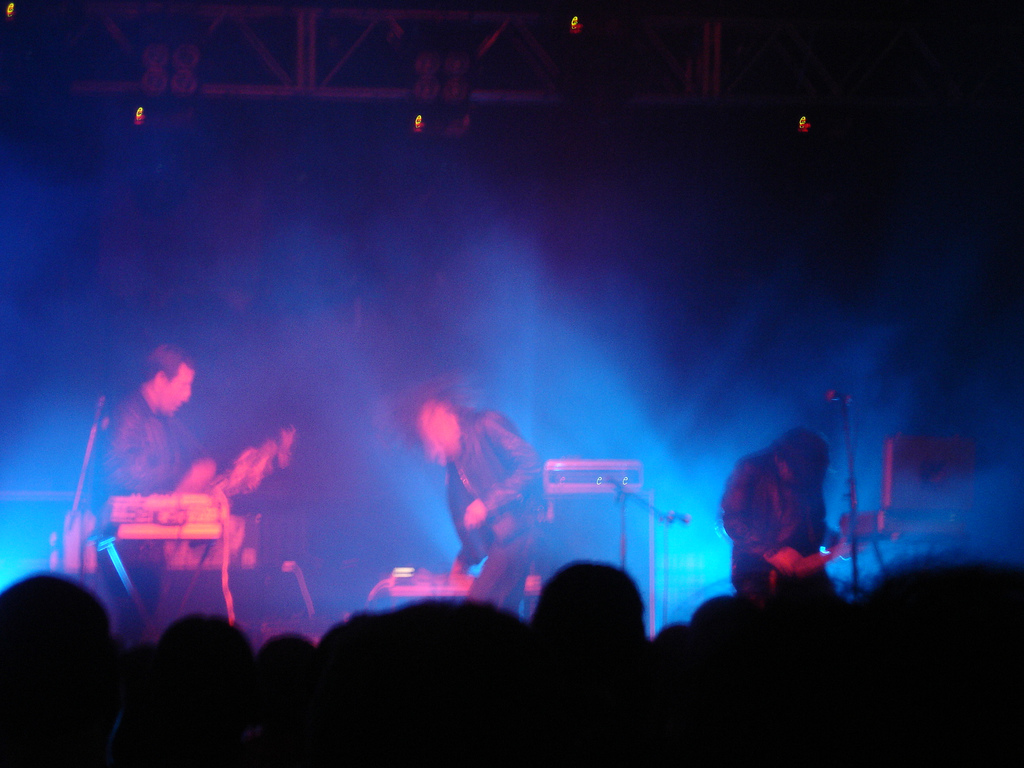
- Wolf Eyes in Glasgow in 2006

Background information
- Origin: Ann Arbor, Michigan, U.S.
- Genres: Noise; free improvisation
- Years active: 1996–present
- Labels: Hanson; Sub Pop; Troubleman Unlimited; Freedom From; Bulb
- Members: Nate Young; John Olson
- Past members: Aaron Dilloway (1999–2005); Mike Connelly (2005–2012); James Baljo (2013-2017)
- Website: www.wolfeyes.net

Wolf Eyes is an American experimental music group from Detroit, Michigan, formed in 1996 by Nate Young. Currently a duo, Wolf Eyes are a prominent act within contemporary noise music. They have collaborated with a variety of artists from different countries and art forms.

== History ==
Wolf Eyes began as a solo project of Nate Young. Aaron Dilloway joined in 1998 while also playing with John Olson in Universal Indians. Olson occasionally performed with Wolf Eyes under the moniker Spykes and joined Wolf Eyes in 2000 after Universal Indians disbanded.

In 2005, Dilloway left Wolf Eyes, uninterested in extensive touring. Mike Connelly (of Hair Police, Failing Lights and Clay Rendering) replaced Dilloway, first appearing on the 2006 album Human Animal. Dilloway did some production work on Human Animal. He has since performed with them on at least two occasions.

It was announced in February 2013 that Connelly had left the group to concentrate on his solo work and Hair Police. He was replaced in the lineup by another Michigan musician, Jim Baljo. Both Dilloway and Connelly appeared on the 2013 album No Answer: Lower Floors. Wolf Eyes is currently composed of Young and Olson; the latter described the band as a "morphed organism that expands and condenses as needed or not." The pair describe their musical output as "psycho jazz".

The group has released 297 recordings during its 20 years of activity. Official releases have appeared on labels including but not limited to Hanson Records, Bulb Records, American Tapes, Fusetron, De Stijl Records, Sub Pop, Third Man Records, Troubleman Unlimited, AA Records, Gods of Tundra and Freedom From. It has collaborated and performed with numerous artists, including Anthony Braxton, Merzbow, Sonic Youth, Black Dice, Dominick Fernow (also known as Prurient), Double Leopards, John Wiese, Mammal, FLUCT, MV Carbon, Twig Harper, Andrew W.K., Jaimie Branch, Emil Beaulieau, Richard Pinhas, and Smegma.

Since 2013, Olson has run the Instagram account inzane_johnny, formerly wolf_eyes_psychojazz, which was initially used to promote Wolf Eyes but has now gained a large following through music-related memes.

== Reception and influence ==
In an article for Spin Magazine, Henry Rollins named Olson's noise bands in a column about his five favorite bands, writing, "The guy has over 1,000 releases on his label, and I have almost 700 of them. I have a great deal of time for all of these noise terrorists—it's modern avant-meets-stoners in a basement".

Fred Thomas of AllMusic observed

Their development since the earliest rumblings in 1997 (and further back than that for those with the energy to dig into pre-Wolf Eyes projects) has yielded some of the most staggering and genre-defining sounds of noise and sound art's dense, largely obscured history.

== Distribution ==
Most Wolf Eyes recordings are self-released, following the DIY tradition of bands such as Smegma.

Wolf Eyes' first major release was the studio album Dread, released on the American Tapes and Hanson Records labels but distributed through Bulb Records. Other major releases include Dead Hills on Troubleman Unlimited as well as Burned Mind and Human Animal on Sub Pop. Most Wolf Eyes recordings are released as lathe cuts, cassettes, or CD-Rs.

== Partial discography ==
=== 1997 ===
- Wolf Eyes cass (Hanson)

=== 1998 ===
- Heatwave cass (Hanson)

=== 1999 ===
- split w/ Nautical Almanac LP (Hanson)

=== 2000 ===
- Fortune Dove split w/ Andrew W.K. 12" (Bulb)
- Wulf Eys / Andy W. Krier cass (Meatball)
- Live Summer '00 cass (American Tapes)
- With Spykes CD-R (Hanson)
- Half Dogs CD-R (American Tapes)

=== 2001 ===
- Egypt Skull CD-R (American Tapes)
- Wolf Eyes CD (Bulb)
- split w/ Metalux cass (Spite)
- Live Vol. 1 CD-R (Little Hands)
- Moral Witchcraft CD-R (American Tapes)
- Droll cass (American Tapes)
- Untitled a.k.a. Dubbed At Ft. Thunder cass (Hanson)
- Fuck Cleveland CD-R (American Tapes)
- Scowl CD-R (American Tapes)
- Droll Vol. 2 cass (American Tapes)
- Technical Difficulties CD-R (Little Hands)
- Sandpapered Eyes CD-R (American Tapes)
- Dread LP (Hanson/American Tapes) (reissued on CD in 2002 on Bulb label)
- split w/ Old Bombs CD-R (Betley Welcomes...)
- Droll Vol. 3 double cass (American Tapes)
- Throat Virus Alive CD-R (American Tapes)
- Not Our Laws 3" CD-R (American Tapes)
- Not Our Laws Vol. 2 3" CD-R (American Tapes)
- Droll Vol. 4 cass (American Tapes)
- Black Aroma CD-R (American Tapes)
- Slicer cass (Hanson) (reissued on CD in 2002 on Hanson label)
- Chimes in Black Water w/ Black Dice CD-R (American Tapes)
- Music for Valie Export CD-R (American Tapes)
- Droll Vol. 5 cass (American Tapes)
- Early Vol. 1 cass (Hanson)
- Y'all Must Be Really Mad at Something CD-R (American Tapes)
- Droll Vol. 7 cass (American Tapes)

=== 2002 ===
- split w/ Crack 12" (F-Cute)
- Black Rat Floods 3" CD-R (American Tapes)
- Dead Hills 3" CD-R (American Tapes)
- Droll Vol. 6 cass (American Tapes)
- Live at Bulb CD-R (Bulb)
- "Cut The Dog" b/w "Friday the 13th" 7" (American Tapes)
- Possession Tissues 4 x CD-R boxset (American Tapes)
- Uglied CD-R (Polyamory)
- Snake Transmitters CD-R (American Tapes)
- Fuck Pete Larsen LP (Bad Glue) (reissued on CD in 2004 on Wabana label)
- Droll Vol. 8 cass (American Tapes)
- "Powerless" one-sided 7" (American Tapes)
- Interminal Bleedings CD-R (American Tapes)
- Strangulation Tank CD-R (American Tapes)
- Throats Filled With Concrete CD-R (American Tapes)
- Dead Hills CD / picture LP (Troubleman)
- Chimes in Black Water Vol. 2 w/ Black Dice CD-R (American Tapes)

=== 2003 ===
- Droll Vol. 9 cass (American Tapes)
- Droll Vol. 11 cass (American Tapes)
- "Dry Sockets" one-sided 7" (American Tapes)
- Strangled in Filth CD-R (American Tapes)
- Community Mental Health CD-R (American Tapes)
- Star Burke CD-R & tape & 7" (no label)
- Fuck Birmingham cass (American Tapes)
- Droll Vol. 12 cass (American Tapes)
- Mugger CD-R (Hanson)
- Covered in Bugs DVD-R (Hanson)
- Chimes in Black Water Vol. 3 w/ Black Dice CD-R (American Tapes)
- split w/ Smegma cass (American Tapes)
- Biles CD-R (American Tapes)
- Asylum Style CD-R (American Tapes)
- Recycled cass (RRRecords)
- Undertakers Vol. 1 cass (Since 1972)
- Undertakers Vol. 2 cass (Polyamory)
- Punx Mafia AHOY! split w/ Pengüin Lüst LP (American Tapes)
- Fuck the Old Miami 3" CD-R (Chondritic Sound) (reissued on LP in 2005 on Important Records)
- split w/ Emil Beaulieau anti-7" (RRRecords)
- Asylum Style Part 2 CD-R (American Tapes)
- Untitled presto lathe-cut 10" (no label)
- Untitled w/ Black Dice LP (Fusetron)
- Untitled w/ John Wiese 7" (American Tapes)
- The Beast w/ Smegma LP/CD (De Stijl)
- Droll Vol. 13 cass (American Tapes)

=== 2004 ===
- Droll Vol. 14 cass (American Tapes)
- Asylum Style 3 CD-R (American Tapes)
- Asylum Style 4 CD-R (American Tapes)
- Live Scum CD-R (Hanson)
- Fuck the Firesidebowl CD-R (Audiobot)
- "Depth Charges" one-sided 7" (American Tapes)
- Undertakers Vol. 3 cass (Gods of Tundra)
- Asylum Style 5 CD-R (American Tapes)
- Stabbed in the Face 12" (Sub Pop)
- with John Wiese Two CD-R (American Tapes)
- Droll Vol 15 cass (American Tapes)
- Droll Vol 16 cass (American Tapes)
- Asylum Style 6 CD-R (American Tapes)
- Burned Mind CD (Sub Pop) & LP (Hanson / American Tapes)
- Droll Vol 17 cass (American Tapes)
- Stabbed In The Face split 12" with Panicsville (Nihilist)
- Dog Jaw CD-R (Heresee)
- Lost Sockets 10" (Crippled Intellect)
- Fuck The Pigs CD-R (no label)
- with Double Leopards Breeding Turbines cass (American Tapes)
- Asylum Style 7 CD-R (American Tapes)
- Droll Vol 18 cass (American Tapes)

=== 2005 ===
- Droll Vol 10 3 x cassette set American Tapes (American Tapes)
- Asylum Style 8 CD-R American Tapes (American Tapes)
- Breeding Turbines Vol. 2 (with Double Leopards) CD-R (American Tapes)
- Droll 19 cass American Tapes (American Tapes)
- Asylum Style Ten 6 x CD-R set American Tapes (American Tapes)
- Lung Malfunction (Gods of Tundra)
- Deranged CD-R (Gods of Tundra)
- Live!!! (with Hair Police) cass (Purple Stuff)
- Live At Banfields East CD-R (American Tapes)
- Human Slaughterhouse Demos CD-R (American Tapes)
- Buried By Fog CD-R (Gods of Tundra)
- River of Haze CD-R (Gods of Tundra)
- Rotting Remains 8" lathe cut (Kning Disk)
- Asylum Style 9 CD-R (American Tapes)
- Asylum Style 10 6 CD-R set (American Tapes)
- Wolf Eyes / Prurient LP (Gods of Tundra)
- The Warriors (with Prurient) CD (Hospital)
- The Value of An Empty Body part 1 cass (American Tapes)
- The Value of An Empty Body part 2 cass (American Tapes)
- Untitled 7" lathe (Aryan Asshole)
- Slam Section cass (Fag Tapes)
- Nightmares in XXXmas 2 x CD-R (American Tapes)

=== 2006 ===
- Live Corruption cass (Gods of Tundra)
- Six Arms And Sucks (Live In Porto) CD-R (Esquilo)
- River Slaughter 2XLP (Hospital Productions)
- Black Vomit (with Anthony Braxton) CD (Victo)
- Stained Lines CD-R (American Tapes)
- Yes, I Am Your Angel split LP with The Skull Defekts (Fang Bomb)
- Guillotine Keys one-sided LP (Ultra Eczema)
- The Driller Live in San Francisco CD-R (Enterruption)
- Strangle Rations CD-R (American Tapes)
- Tests From The Comfort Zone CD-R (Gods of Tundra)
- The Black Plague split w/ Grey Daturas CD (Heathen Skulls)
- Driller b/w Psychogeist 12" (Sub Pop)
- Human Animal CD/LP (Sub Pop)
- Wolf Eyes (Live in Toronto) CD-R (Sub Pop)
- Live Frying: Chicago CD-R (American Tapes)
- Tin Coffin 2 2CD-R+cass (American Tapes)
- Wheels Of Confusion Vol.1 CD-R (American Tapes)
- Wheels Of Confusion Vol.2 CD-R (American Tapes)
- Wheels Of Confusion Vol.3 CD-R (American Tapes)
- Manchester Is Dead CD-R (Gods Of Tundra)

=== 2007 ===
- Black Wing Over The Sand CD/LP (Kning Disk)
- Shattered cass (Hospital Productions)
- Hell Made Man CD-R (American Tapes)
- Made Hell Man CD-R (American Tapes)
- Man Made Hell CD-R (American Tapes)
- Time of Clearing CD-R (American Tapes)
- Vacuum CD-R (Gods Of Tundra)
- Wolf Eyes / Spykes / Failing Lights / Nate Young 2xLP (Troubleman Unlimited)
- Intrusion CD-R (Gods of Tundra)
- Claustrophobic CD-R (Gods of Tundra)
- Tin Coffin Three 2xCD-R 1xCass (American Tapes)
- "Dogs On Stage" CD-R (8mm)
- "Live at Oberlin" DVD (AA Records)

=== 2008 ===
- "Hypnotic Brutality" live performance film (Subliminal Films)
- "There Is A Part Of Me You Will Never Know" LP (with Sickness) (Hospital Productions)
- "Back to Attack" 2xCD-R 1xCass (American Tapes)
- "Garbage Plate" CD-R (American Tapes)
- "Garbage Plate 2" CD-R (American Tapes)
- "Nuisance" CD-R (Gods of Tundra)
- "Live Frying: PDX/Sacto" cass (American Tapes)

=== 2009 ===
- "Live In Cleveland" CD-R (Mistake By The Lake/Everyone Else Has A Record Label, So Why Can't I?)
- "A Mast on No Shore" CD-R (American Tapes)
- "Completely Wrong/Variations On The Bottomless Pit" 2xCD-R (AA Records)
- "Attack to Black" 2xCD-R 2xCass (American Tapes)
- "I'm a Problem 1" cass (American Tapes)
- "I'm a Problem 2" cass (American Tapes)
- "Impersonal, Amplified, Unknown" CD-R (American Tapes)
- "Moods in Free Time" CD-R (Gods of Tundra)
- "Moods in Free Time vol. 2" CD-R (Gods of Tundra)
- "Always Wrong" CD (Hospital Productions)

=== 2010 ===
- "Hygiene Chamber" CD-R (American Tapes)
- "Statues Are Active" CD-R (American Tapes)
- "All Identical, None Complete" CD-R (American Tapes)
- "Mind In Pieces" CD-R+cass (American Tapes)
- "Sept 3" cass (American Tapes)
- "No Matter" CD-R (AA Records)
- "Swollen Advantage 5/5/10" Lathe, 5", S/Sided + CD-R

=== 2011 ===
- "Live Utrecht" CD-R

=== 2012 ===
- Wolf Eyes / Hunting Lodge w/ Apetechnology - @ Destroy Compound CD-R/cass (Destroy)
- Richard Pinhas, Merzbow, Wolf Eyes - Victoriaville Mai 2011 CD (Les Disques Victo)
- Log Jam 3xCD-R (American Tapes)

=== 2013 ===
- No Answer: Lower Floors (De Stijl)
- Live Frying: Live Brooklyn 2013 CD-R (American Tapes)
- Live Frying: Live Germany 2013 CD-R (American Tapes)

=== 2014 ===
- Live Frying: Live CD-R (American Tapes)

=== 2015 ===
- I Am A Problem: Mind In Pieces (Third Man)

=== 2017 ===
- Undertow (Lower Floor Music)
- Right in Front of You (Lower Floor Music)
- Lowered 1 (Lower Floor Music)

=== 2019 ===
- Trained Talk (Not On Label)
- Centralized Choirs A (Not On Label)
- Centralized Choirs B (Not On Label)

=== 2023 ===
- More Difficult Messages with Model Home
