= Model Home =

Experimental hip-hop duo

- Origin: Washington, D.C.
- Genres: Experimental; hip hop; electronic
- Years active: 2018–present
- Members: Patrick Cain; Davonte "NappyNappa" Squire

Model Home (also stylized as model home) is an American experimental music duo composed of producer Patrick Cain and vocalist Davonte Squire, also known as NappyNappa.

== History ==
In 2020, Model Home released the compilation album One Year was released through Disciples, a Warp subsidiary. In 2021, they released the album both feet en th infinite through Don Giovanni Records. A second compilation album through Disciples, Saturn in the Basement was released in 2022.

In 2023, they released More Difficult Messages, an album with Wolf Eyes.

== Discography ==
=== Albums ===
==== Studio albums ====
List of studio albums, with selected details
Title	Album details
SE	Released: October 2, 2020; Format: Streaming
both feet en th infinite	Released: November 5, 2021; Label: Don Giovanni; Formats: Digital download, streaming, vinyl
endless spool	Released: May 5, 2023; Formats: Digital download, streaming
summr mmry	Released: July 5, 2023; Formats: Digital download, streaming

==== Live albums ====
List of live albums, with selected details
Title	Album details
Live at the White Hotel	Released: October 14, 2022; Formats: Digital download, streaming
still stackin ft. Tooth Choir	Released:February 18, 2023; Formats: Digital download, streaming
NECROLYF	Released: March 19, 2024; Formats: Digital download, streaming

==== Compilation albums ====
List of compilation albums, with selected details
Title	Album details
One Year	Released: June 26, 2020; Label: Disciples; Formats: Digital download, streaming, vinyl
Saturn in the Basement	Released: May 26, 2022; Label: Disciples; Formats: Digital download, streaming, vinyl
A Saturn Companion	Released: June 26, 2022; Formats: Digital download, streaming, cassette

==== Collaborative albums ====
List of collaborative albums, with selected details
Title	Album details
Versions Returned	Collaborative project with His Name is Alive consisting of their original Versions Returned mixtape and reworked versions by Model Home on the Versions Returned mixtape; Released: August 26, 2020; Formats: Digital download, streaming, cassette
More Difficult Messages	With Wolf Eyes; Released: July 12, 2023; Formats: Digital download, streaming

==== Remix albums ====
List of remix albums, with selected details
Title	Album details
Model Home x Pure Rave	Material from One Year remixed by Pure Rave; Released: July 3, 2020; Formats: Digital download, streaming, cassette

=== Extended plays ===
List of extended plays, with selected details
Title	Album details
Model Home (1)	Released: June 15, 2018; Formats: Digital download, streaming, vinyl
2	Released: June 22, 2018; Formats: Digital download, streaming
3	Released: September 29, 2018; Formats: Digital download, streaming
4	Released: November 25, 2018; Formats: Digital download, streaming
5	Released: December 21, 2018; Formats: Digital download, streaming
6	Released: January 24, 2019; Formats: Digital download, streaming
7	Released: July 16, 2019; Formats: Digital download, streaming
8	Released: June 7, 2019; Formats: Digital download, streaming
9	Released: July 10, 2019; Formats: Digital download, streaming
10	Released: August 25, 2019; Formats: Digital download, streaming
11	Released: November 7, 2019; Formats: Digital download, streaming
12	Released: November 14, 2019; Formats: Digital download, streaming
13	Released: December 6, 2019; Formats: Digital download, streaming
14	Released: January 14, 2020; Formats: Digital download, streaming
15	Released: March 26, 2020; Formats: Digital download, streaming
16	Released: November April 10, 2020; Formats: Digital download, streaming
17	Released: July 3, 2020; Formats: Digital download, streaming
18	Released: August 10, 2020; Formats: Digital download, streaming
19	Released: January 19, 2021; Formats: Digital download, streaming
20	Released: October 1, 2022; Formats: Digital download, streaming
JuJu MineField	Released: September 1, 2023; Formats: Streaming

=== Singles ===
List of singles, with selected details
Title	Year	Album
"Faultfinder"	2020	One Year
"Grip"	2020	One Year
"Livin' In A Treehouse"	2020	One Year
"REV b/w Flesh"	2020	SE
"Night Break"	2021	both feet en th infinite
"Body Power"	2021	both feet en th infinite
"yard 1"	2022	Saturn in the Basement
"couch"	2022	Saturn in the Basement
"naked intentions"	2022	Saturn in the Basement
