= Intuitive American Esoteric =

Intuitive American Esoteric, Vol. 1

Studio album by Twig Harper
- Released: 2005 (Ltd. 555 copies)
- Genre: noise electronic
- Label: Audiobot (BOT 034), HereSee, Ignivomous, No Sides (NS 14), White Tapes

Intuitive American Esoteric is the name of a limited three-volume, multi-label series of LP records by Nautical Almanac member Twig Harper, released between 2005 and 2006. Each album features a standard cut recording on side A and a handmade lathe-cut recording featuring numerous locked grooves on side B. Regarding the first two records in the series, Harper commented:

"I released "Intuitive American Esoteric" vol 1 +2 on LP, one side was mastered normally the other side were examples of lathe cuts. For volume 1 I cut the lathe master plate real scratchy and distant. On vol 2 the lathe side was experiments of sine waves cut on top of each other, at various depths and frequency."

== Volume 1 ==
1. "Untitled"
2. "Untitled"

Intuitive American Esoteric, Vol. 2

Studio album by Twig Harper
- Released: 2005
- Genre: noise electronic
- Label: American Tapes, Ecstatic Peace!, Gods of Tundra, HereSee (hs0037), Slowtoe (STPRI00A)

== Volume 2 ==
1. "Untitled"
2. "Untitled"

Intuitive American Esoteric, Vol. 3

Studio album by Twig Harper
- Released: 2006 (Ltd. 200 copies)
- Genre: noise electronic
- Label: HereSee

== Volume 3 ==
1. "Untitled"
2. "Untitled"
