= Along the Way (Mark McGuire album) =

Studio album by Mark McGuire
- Released: February 4, 2014
- Length: 67:31
- Label: Dead Oceans
- Producer: Mark McGuire

Mark McGuire chronology
Get Lost (2011)	Along the Way (2014)	Beyond Belief (2015)

Singles from Along the Way
- 1. "The Instinct" Released: 2013

Along the Way is a solo studio album by Mark McGuire, a former member of Emeralds. It was released on Dead Oceans on February 4, 2014. "The Instinct" was released as a single from the album.

== Critical reception ==
Professional ratings
Aggregate scores
Source	Rating
Metacritic	75/100
Review scores
Source	Rating
AllMusic	4/5 stars
Blurt	5/5 stars
Fact	3/5
The 405	8/10
The Line of Best Fit	7/10 stars
MusicOMH	3.5/5 stars
NME	7/10
Pitchfork	7.9/10
Tiny Mix Tapes	3/5 stars
Under the Radar	7/10 stars

At Metacritic, which assigns a weighted average score out of 100 to reviews from mainstream critics, the album received an average score of 75, based on 14 reviews, indicating "generally favorable reviews".

Fred Thomas of AllMusic commented that "Along the Way represents the most ambitious material from McGuire to date, including deeper production and a plethora of various instruments that never made it into the laser-focused explorations of solo guitar that made up previous albums." He added: "It's an incredible feat for an artist to make something so enormous and unfolding without losing himself in the process, but McGuire has done just that, and as a result has turned in his most detailed and soul-searching work." Tom Fenwick of Under the Radar gave the album 7 stars out of 10, writing: "Carving out layers of sound from digital percussion, distant auto-tuned vocals, and washes of synthesized atmospherics, he surrounds them with his virtuosic playing of electric and acoustic guitar."

== Track listing ==
All tracks are written by Mark McGuire.

I: To All Present in the Hall of Learning
No.	Title	Length
1.	"Awakening"	1:20
2.	"Wonderland of Living Things"	2:51
3.	"In Search of the Miraculous"	5:53
4.	"To the Macrobes (Where Do I Go?)"	5:05
5.	"Astray"	1:55

II: The Age of Revealing
No.	Title	Length
6.	"Silent Weapons (The Architects of Manipulation)"	5:14
7.	"The Instinct"	12:00

III: After the Heavy Rains
No.	Title	Length
8.	"The Human Condition (Song for My Father)"	4:11
9.	"For the Friendships (Along the Way)"	8:30
10.	"Arrival Begins the Next Departure"	5:11

IV: To the Palace of the Self
No.	Title	Length
11.	"The War on Consciousness"	6:05
12.	"The Lonelier Way"	5:37
13.	"Turiya (The Same Way)"	3:47
Total length:		67:31

== Personnel ==
Credits adapted from liner notes.

- Mark McGuire – vocals, electric guitar, acoustic guitar, bass guitar, mandolin, santur, piano, keyboards, synthesizer, talkbox, percussion, drum machine, tape samples, electronics, effects, production, arrangement, mixing, photography, design, layout
- James Plotkin – mastering
- Daniel Murphy – design, layout
