= No Answer: Lower Floors =

Studio album by Wolf Eyes
- Released: April 2, 2013
- Genre: Noise
- Length: 38:05
- Label: De Stijl

Wolf Eyes chronology
Victoriaville Mai (2011)	No Answer: Lower Floors (2013)

Professional ratings
Aggregate scores
Source	Rating
Metacritic	83/100
Review scores
Source	Rating
Allmusic	4.5/5 stars

No Answer: Lower Floors is a studio album by American noise trio Wolf Eyes. It was released in April 2013 under De Stijl Records.

== Track list ==
No.	Title	Length
1.	"Choking Flies"	6:01
2.	"Born Liar"	3:06
3.	"No Answer"	1:28
4.	"Chattering Lead"	8:11
5.	"Confessions of the Informer"	12:16
6.	"Warning Sign"	7:03
