= Along the Way (TV series) =

Canadian children's television series

- Genre: Children's anthology
- Country of origin: Canada
- Original language: English
- No. of seasons: 1

Production
- Running time: 30 minutes

Original release
- Network: CBC Television
- Release: 2 April – 25 June 1974

Along the Way is a Canadian children's television anthology series that aired on CBC Television in 1974.

== Premise ==
Each episode consists of two halves. The first half combines productions from the United Kingdom and Canada. The British segments are titled "Along the River and Seashore" and feature the adventures of two children with their uncle. The Canadian segments, "Along the Trail", present the adventures of a Canadian forest ranger. The second half consists of Canadian-produced independent short films.

One episode, "For the Love of A Horse", features young equestrian rider Anne Lawson. It was an early career production of Mark Irwin.

== Scheduling ==
The series aired on Tuesdays at 5:00 p.m. (Eastern) from 2 April to 25 June 1974.
