= Human Animal =

2006 album by Wolf Eyes

Studio album by Wolf Eyes
- Released: September 26, 2006
- Recorded: 2006
- Genre: Noise rock
- Length: 33:16
- Label: Sub Pop

Wolf Eyes chronology
Burned Mind (2004)	Human Animal (2006)	Black Wing Over the Sand (2007)

Professional ratings
Aggregate scores
Source	Rating
Metacritic	78/100
Review scores
Source	Rating
AllMusic	4/5 stars
Stylus	A−
Tiny Mix Tapes	4/5 stars
Pitchfork	8.2/10

Human Animal is the fifth studio album by American noise music group Wolf Eyes, released on September 26, 2006, by Sub Pop. The title track "Human Animal" is different from the one originally issued on the Wolf Eyes/Prurient split The Warriors (2005). "Noise Not Music" was originally by hardcore punk band No Fucker. The album received critical praise upon release.

== Track listing ==
1. "A Million Years" – 5:01
2. "Lake of Roaches" – 1:58
3. "Rationed Rot" – 8:09
4. "Human Animal" – 3:32
5. "Rusted Mange" – 2:12
6. "Leper War" – 6:03
7. "The Driller" – 3:58
8. "Noise Not Music" – 2:19 (CD only)
