= Aaron Dilloway =

- Born: May 13, 1976 (age 50); Brighton, Michigan, U.S.
- Genres: Avant-garde; experimental; noise
- Occupations: Musician; composer
- Labels: Hanson; Banned Production; Heavy Tapes; RRRecords; Medusa; Throne Heap; Dais
- Member of: Body/Dilloway/Head
- Formerly of: Wolf Eyes
- Website: aarondilloway.bandcamp.com

Aaron Dilloway (born May 13th, 1976) is an American experimental musician. He is an improviser and composer who works with the manipulation of 8-Track tape loops in combination with voice, tape delays, and various organic and electronic sound sources. A founding member of the industrial noise group Wolf Eyes, Dilloway lives in Oberlin, Ohio, where he runs Hanson Records and Mailorder.

== Biography ==
Dilloway was born in 1976 and grew up in Brighton, Michigan. As a teenager, he began attending house shows in nearby Ann Arbor. He formed a group called Galen in the 1990s, and soon after became a member of Couch, for which Galen had opened at its first show. Dilloway then moved to Ann Arbor, where he began working with experimental and noise groups, including Universal Indians, and where he co-founded the group Wolf Eyes, with which he performed until 2004.

Late in 2004, Dilloway moved to Nepal, where he recorded prolifically (his own material, field recordings, and Nepalese radio broadcasts). He moved to Ohio in 2007, working with Emeralds among others, and releasing his own material. Among his releases are 2012's Modern Jester, 2017's The Gag File, and 2026's No Skill Comedy Mind Reading.

He released a collaborative album with Lucrecia Dalt, Lucy & Aaron (2021), through Hanson Records.

He also released a collaborative album with Body/Head, Body/Dilloway/Head (2021), through Three Lobed Recordings.

== Discography ==
=== Studio albums ===
- Modern Jester (Hanson Records, 2012)
- The Gag File (Dais Records, 2017)
- Lucy & Aaron (with Lucrecia Dalt; Hanson Records, 2021)
- Body/Dilloway/Head (with Body/Head, as Body/Dilloway/Head; Three Lobed Recordings, 2021)
- No Skill Comedy Mind Reading (Dais Records, 2026)
