= Hanson Records =

American independent record label

- Founded: 1994
- Founder: Aaron Dilloway
- Distributors: Forced Exposure; Revolver; Volcanic Tongue
- Genre: Noise; drone
- Country of origin: United States
- Location: Oberlin, Ohio
- Official website: Official website

Hanson Records is an American independent record label founded in Brighton, Michigan and now based in Oberlin, Ohio. It is operated by the musician Aaron Dilloway, formerly of the band Wolf Eyes.

== History ==
The label's first release was a 7-inch extended play (EP) by Dilloway's band Galen, in 1994. Eventually moving from Brighton, Michigan to Ann Arbor, Michigan, in 1997 it released the first Wolf Eyes recording, a self-titled cassette. It has since released various other Wolf Eyes recordings as well as albums by Kevin Drumm, Smegma, Hive Mind, Nautical Almanac, Andrew Wilkes-Krier, Hair Police and, following a move to its current base in Oberlin, Ohio, Emeralds and Skin Graft. While releasing music on a variety of formats, including CD-R and LP, the majority of its releases are on cassette, and as such the label is often associated with cassette culture. Recordings for Hanson have low production costs and use low fidelity recording techniques, including recording live straight to cassette.

== See also ==
- List of record labels
