= Bay Village, Ohio =

- City
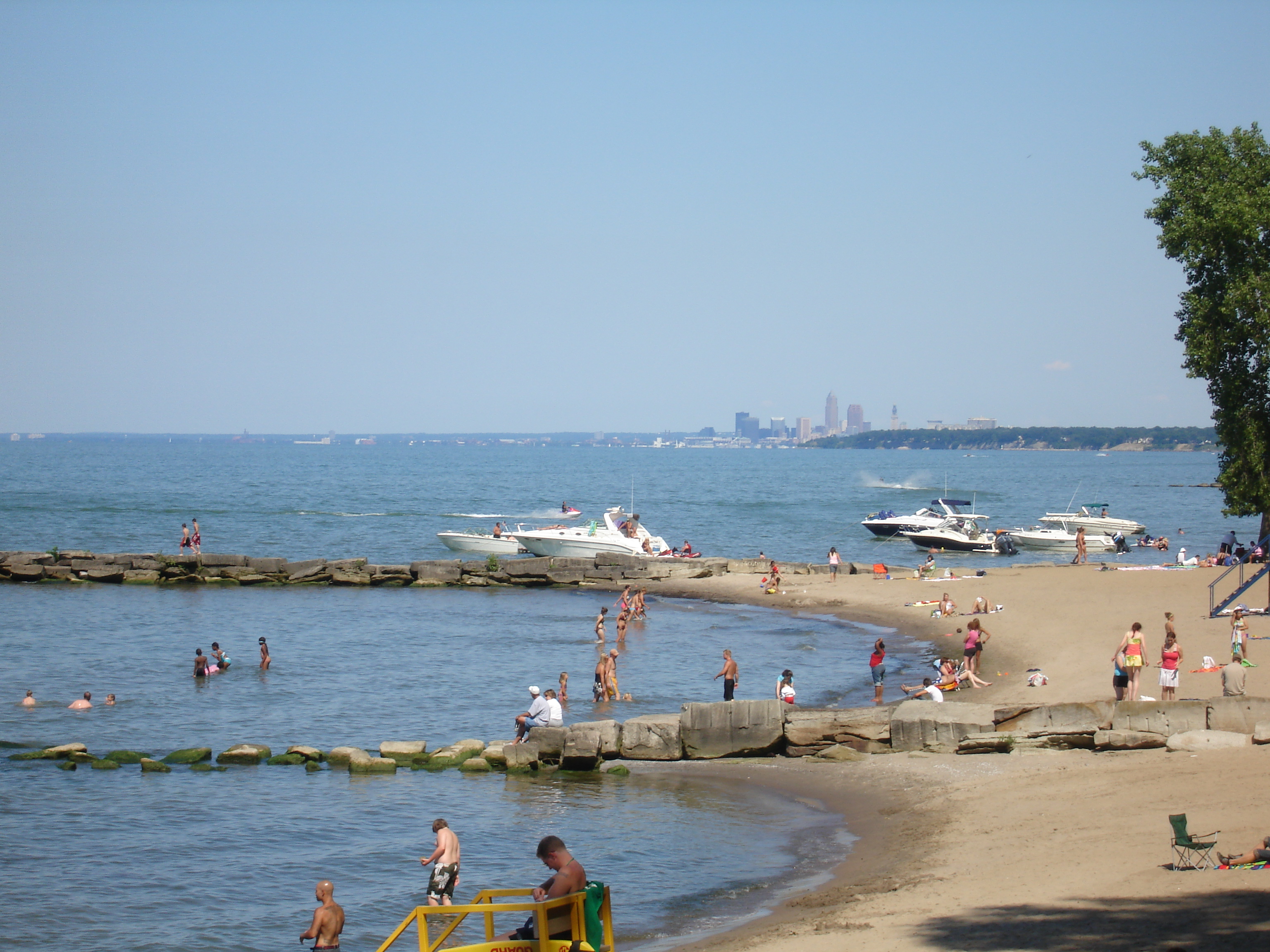
- Huntington Beach
- Interactive map of Bay Village, Ohio
- Location within Ohio Location within the United States
- Coordinates: 41°29′19″N 81°55′43″W
- Country: United States
- State: Ohio
- County: Cuyahoga

Government
  - Mayor: Paul Koomar (R)

Area
  - Total: 7.05 sq mi (18.27 km^{2})
  - Land: 4.57 sq mi (11.83 km^{2})
  - Water: 2.49 sq mi (6.44 km^{2})
- Elevation: 623 ft (190 m)

Population (2020)
  - Total: 16,163
  - Estimate (2023): 15,810
  - Density: 3,540.1/sq mi (1,366.84/km^{2})
- Time zone: UTC-5 (Eastern (EST))
  - Summer (DST): UTC-4 (EDT)
- ZIP code: 44140
- Area code: 440
- FIPS code: 39-04416
- GNIS feature ID: 1085949
- Website: cityofbayvillage.gov

Bay Village is a city in western Cuyahoga County, Ohio, United States. Located along the southern shore of Lake Erie, the city is a western suburb of Cleveland and a part of the Cleveland metropolitan area. The population was 16,163 at the 2020 census.

== History ==
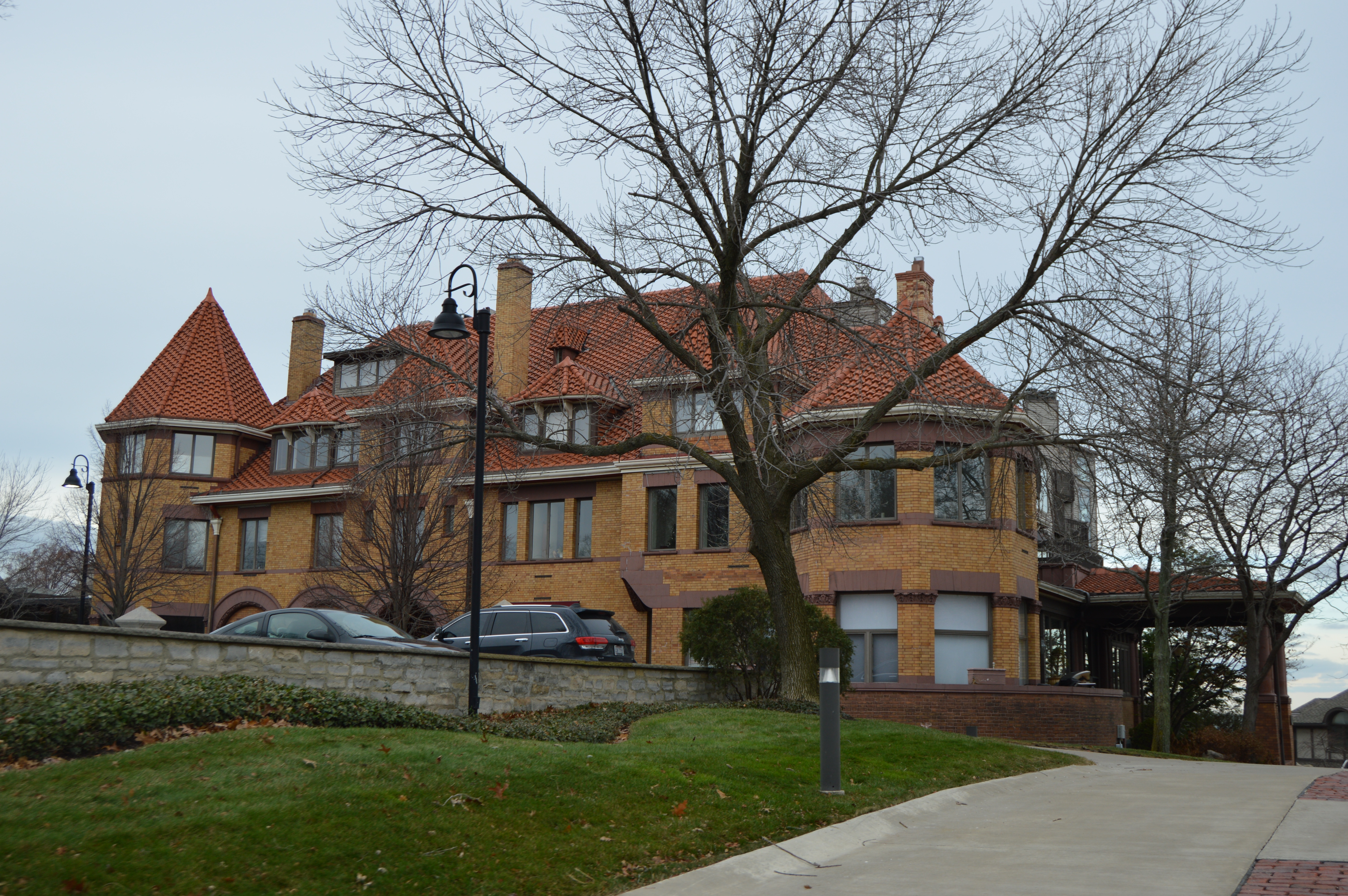
Bay View Hospital (1874)

Before the first European-Americans arrived in the area around 1600, Erie Indians lived in Bay Village and the surrounding areas. The most important Indian trail in Ohio is present-day Lake Road, which is a main road in Bay Village. In that same century, what is now Bay Village, along with Avon Lake, Avon, and Westlake, was part of one territory. This territory was later called by the whites in a native language, Xeuma, a term roughly meaning "those who came before us".

The area belonged to Connecticut until 1803, the year in which Ohio became a state. Before 1803, the Connecticut Land Company sold and gave away land in the area to Connecticut citizens, who had lost their homes and farms during the Revolutionary War. Because many had lost their homes to fires during the war, this new area was named "the Firelands". One surveyor with the Connecticut Land Company was Moses Cleaveland. He came with his friends on horseback from Connecticut and stopped at the Cuyahoga River with his Indian guides in July 1796. The land was then divided into five townships. The area between the Cuyahoga River and The Firelands to the west was laid out in 1806.

Joseph Cahoon settled in what is now Bay Village in 1810. Bay Village was part of the original Dover Township, which comprised present-day Bay Village, Westlake, and portions of North Olmsted. By the turn of the 20th century, Dover would have a permanent population of roughly 2,200, with wealthy part-time residents who owned summer cottages on Lake Erie adding to this total in the summer months. In 1901, landowners in northern Dover forced an election to split from Dover Township, forming Bay Township. In 1903, Bay Village was incorporated, and the first mayor and council were elected. Ida Marie Cahoon, the last Cahoon descendant, died in 1917, leaving the family home and 115 acres of land to the city which is known today as Cahoon Memorial Park. John Huntington, one of the original partners of Standard Oil Company, donated his summer estate to the Cleveland Metroparks, which would later become the Huntington Reservation. Bay Village became a city on January 1, 1950, when it had reached a population of 6,917.

With decades of growth starting in the 1930s, Bay Village became a prominent Cleveland suburb. Today, it is characterized by tree-lined streets of craftsman, Cape Cod, Tudor, and colonial style homes, as well as mansions along the Lake Erie shoreline.

On August 6, 2024, Bay Village was hit by two EF-1 Tornadoes of five total in the greater Cleveland area, it left large parts of the area without power.

== Geography ==
According to the United States Census Bureau, the city has a total area of 7.06 square miles (18.29 km^{2}), of which, 4.57 square miles (11.84 km^{2}) is land and 2.49 square miles (6.45 km^{2}) is water.

Bay Village is home to the Cleveland Metroparks Huntington Reservation. Lake Erie Nature & Science Center and BAYarts are also located within the reservation. Bay Village is located in Ohio's 7th congressional district.

== Demographics ==
Historical population
| Census | Pop. | Note | %± |
|---|---|---|---|
| 1910 | 450 | | — |
| 1920 | 751 | | 66.9% |
| 1930 | 2,294 | | 205.5% |
| 1940 | 3,356 | | 46.3% |
| 1950 | 6,917 | | 106.1% |
| 1960 | 14,489 | | 109.5% |
| 1970 | 18,163 | | 25.4% |
| 1980 | 17,839 | | −1.8% |
| 1990 | 17,000 | | −4.7% |
| 2000 | 16,087 | | −5.4% |
| 2010 | 15,651 | | −2.7% |
| 2020 | 16,163 | | 3.3% |
| 2023 (est.) | 15,810 | | −2.2% |
U.S. Decennial Census

=== Racial and ethnic composition ===
Bay Village city, Ohio – Racial and ethnic composition Note: the US Census treats Hispanic/Latino as an ethnic category. This table excludes Latinos from the racial categories and assigns them to a separate category. Hispanics/Latinos may be of any race.
| Race / Ethnicity (NH = Non-Hispanic) | Pop 2000 | Pop 2010 | Pop 2020 | % 2000 | % 2010 | % 2020 |
|---|---|---|---|---|---|---|
| White alone (NH) | 15,655 | 14,973 | 15,019 | 97.31% | 95.67% | 92.92% |
| Black or African American alone (NH) | 42 | 85 | 95 | 0.26% | 0.54% | 0.59% |
| Native American or Alaska Native alone (NH) | 4 | 14 | 2 | 0.02% | 0.09% | 0.01% |
| Asian alone (NH) | 116 | 145 | 162 | 0.72% | 0.93% | 1.00% |
| Native Hawaiian or Pacific Islander alone (NH) | 1 | 4 | 1 | 0.01% | 0.03% | 0.01% |
| Other race alone (NH) | 19 | 24 | 26 | 0.12% | 0.15% | 0.16% |
| Mixed race or Multiracial (NH) | 93 | 155 | 422 | 0.58% | 0.99% | 2.61% |
| Hispanic or Latino (any race) | 157 | 251 | 436 | 0.98% | 1.60% | 2.70% |
| Total | 16,087 | 15,651 | 16,163 | 100.00% | 100.00% | 100.00% |

=== 2020 census ===
As of the 2020 census, there were 16,163 people in Bay Village living in 6,208 households, including 4,291 families. The population density was 3,536.8 inhabitants per square mile (1,365.6/km^{2}). There were 6,466 housing units at an average density of 1,414.9 per square mile (546.3/km^{2}).

The racial makeup of the city was 93.8% White, 0.6% African American, >0.1% Native American, 1.0% Asian, 0.5% from other races, and 4.0% from two or more races. Hispanic or Latino of any race were 2.7%.

The median age was 43.7 years. 24.4% of residents were under the age of 18 and 20.3% of residents were 65 years of age or older. For every 100 females there were 93.6 males, and for every 100 females age 18 and over there were 91.3 males age 18 and over.

There were 6,208 households in Bay Village, of which 34.0% had children under the age of 18 living in them. Of all households, 61.7% were married-couple households, 12.3% were households with a male householder and no spouse or partner present, and 22.7% were households with a female householder and no spouse or partner present. About 24.1% of all households were made up of individuals and 13.4% had someone living alone who was 65 years of age or older.

There were 6,466 housing units, of which 4.0% were vacant. Among occupied housing units, 91.8% were owner-occupied and 8.2% were renter-occupied. The homeowner vacancy rate was 0.7% and the rental vacancy rate was 12.2%.

Of the city's population over the age of 25, 69% hold a bachelor's degree or higher, including 28% with a graduate or professional degree, making Bay Village one of the most highly educated communities in Ohio.

Racial composition as of the 2020 census
| Race | Number | Percent |
|---|---|---|
| White | 15,165 | 93.8% |
| Black or African American | 97 | 0.6% |
| American Indian and Alaska Native | 6 | <0.1% |
| Asian | 163 | 1.0% |
| Native Hawaiian and Other Pacific Islander | 2 | <0.1% |
| Some other race | 87 | 0.5% |
| Two or more races | 643 | 4.0% |
| Hispanic or Latino (of any race) | 436 | 2.7% |

=== 2024 American Community Survey ===
The median household income as of the 2024 American Community Survey 5-Year Estimate was $132,254.

=== 2010 census ===
At the 2010 census there were 15,651 people in 6,198 households, including 4,441 families, in the city. The population density was 3,424.7 inhabitants per square mile (1,322.3/km^{2}). There were 6,436 housing units at an average density of 1,408.3 per square mile (543.7/km^{2}). The racial makeup of the city was 97.0% White, 0.5% African American, 0.1% Native American, 0.9% Asian, 0.3% from other races, and 1.1% from two or more races. Hispanic or Latino of any race were 1.6%.

Of the 6,198 households 33.7% had children under the age of 18 living with them, 61.7% were married couples living together, 7.7% had a female householder with no husband present, 2.2% had a male householder with no wife present, and 28.3% were non-families. 25.0% of households were one person and 11.1% were one person aged 65 or older. The average household size was 2.50 and the average family size was 3.02.

The median age was 43.4 years. 25.4% of residents were under the age of 18; 4.4% were between the ages of 18 and 24; 22.6% were from 25 to 44; 32% were from 45 to 64; and 15.5% were 65 or older. The gender makeup of the city was 47.5% male and 52.5% female.

Of the city's population over the age of 25, 56% hold a bachelor's degree or higher.

=== 2000 census ===
At the 2000 census there were 16,087 people in 6,239 households, including 4,685 families, in the city. The population density was 3,473.4 inhabitants per square mile (1,341.1/km^{2}). There were 6,401 housing units at an average density of 1,382.1 per square mile (533.6/km^{2}). The racial makeup of the city was 89.0% White, 9.3% African American, 0.01% Native American, 0.7% Asian, 0.01% Pacific Islander, 0.2% from other races, and 0.7% from two or more races. Hispanic or Latino of any race were 1.0%. 21.6% were of German, 20.4% Irish, 10.6% English, 8.6% Italian and 5.1% Polish ancestry according to Census 2000.

Of the 6,239 households, 34.1% had children under the age of 18 living with them, 65.8% were married couples living together, 17.4% had a female householder with no husband present, and 24.9% were non-families. 22.1% of households were one person and 9.6% were one person aged 65 or older. The average household size was 2.55 and the average family size was 3.01.

The age distribution was 25.9% under the age of 18, 4.4% from 18 to 24, 26.4% from 25 to 44, 29.0% from 45 to 64, and 14.4% 65 or older. The median age was 41.1 years. For every 100 females, there were 92.1 males. For every 100 females age 18 and over, there were 88.9 males.

The median household income was $70,397 and the median family income was $33,686. Males had a median income of $36,061 versus $18,746 for females. The per capita income for the city was $35,318. About 2.0% of families and 3.0% of the population were below the poverty line.

== Education ==
There are about 2,500 students in the Bay Village City School District, and four school buildings. Normandy Elementary serves grades K–2, Westerly Elementary serves grades 3–4, Bay Middle School serves grades 5–8, and Bay High School serves grades 9–12.

In 2019, Bay Village City Schools were ranked as the tenth-best district in the state of Ohio.

== Notable people ==
- John Elliott (born 1984), musician in the band Emeralds
- Rich Fields (born 1960), broadcaster and popular announcer of The Price Is Right
- Jonathan Freeman (born 1950), actor and singer
- Brad Friedel (born 1971), former goalkeeper for Tottenham Hotspur, and retired US National Team goalkeeper
- Otto Graham (1921–2003) Pro Football Hall of Fame quarterback for the Cleveland Browns
- Steve Hauschildt, musician and member of the band Emeralds
- Patricia Heaton (born 1958), award-winning actress from The Middle and Everybody Loves Raymond
- Bill Balas (born 19??), television writer and producer; known for Bates Motel and Animal Kingdom
- Karen Kresge (born 1948), former star solo ice skating performer for Ice Follies and Holiday on Ice
- Peter Laughner (born 1952) musician who was a member of Rocket from the Tombs and Pere Ubu
- Amy Mihaljevic (1978–1989), kidnapping and homicide victim
- Eliot Ness (1903–1957), Cleveland police investigator and federal agent
- Richard Patrick (born 1968), co-founder of the alternative rock band Filter and former member of Nine Inch Nails
- Richard North Patterson (born 1947), Best-selling American fiction writer and political commentator
- Lili Reinhart (born 1996), actress, known for portraying Betty Cooper on the TV series Riverdale.
- Sam Sheppard (1923–1970), convicted in controversial 1954 murder case
- George Steinbrenner (1930–2010), former owner of the New York Yankees
- Kate Voegele (born 1986), singer and actress
- Dave Zastudil (born 1978), former NFL punter
