= Tom Langford =

American singer-songwriter

- Birth name: Tom Langford
- Genres: Alternative rock, folk
- Years active: 1990–present
- Labels: GoDigital Records
- Website: TomLangford.com

Tom Langford is an American alternative rock/folk singer and songwriter. Paste magazine described his music as "somewhere between Nick Drake's fragile beauty and Leonard Cohen's wry, literary folk."

== Biography ==
Langford first realised his love of song-writing in 1990, having lived in Italy and France for a year beforehand. Initially he busked and played in cafés and bars in Europe. Whilst hitch-hiking, the driver who picked him up happened to his guitar, and dropped him at a house occupied by five other musicians. Within a few days of living with them, playing music all day, he knew that this was his calling.

When he returned to the United States, he played gigs around the Los Angeles area, but his touring expanded to other parts of California.

XM Satellite Radio named him the Best New Acoustic Rock Artist for 2005. In 2006, Langford signed a deal with GoDigital Records, a subsidiary of the GoDigital Media Group for exclusive worldwide digital distribution.

== Discography ==
=== Albums ===
Year	Album
2002	Places You Know
2003	Mercy To Be Found
2006	Here Comes Memory
2007	The Rock Garden
2007	Along The Way
