= London in Stereo =

London In Stereo
- Editor: Jess Partridge
- Categories: Music
- First issue: February 2013
- Final issue: March 2020
- Country: United Kingdom
- Based in: London
- Language: English
- Website: www.londoninstereo.com

London in Stereo was a print and online magazine offering gig listings, interviews, reviews, and live music listings for London.

Founded in February 2013 they produced a monthly print guide and weekly gig guides. The magazine went on hiatus in 2019 and announced its closure in October 2022
