= Emeralds (band) =

Electronic and ambient trio from the U.S.

- Emeralds in 2011

Background information
- Origin: Cleveland, Ohio, U.S.
- Genres: Electronic; ambient; experimental; hypnagogic pop
- Years active: 2006–2013; 2022–present
- Labels: Editions Mego; Hanson
- Members: John Elliott; Steve Hauschildt; Mark McGuire

Emeralds is an American electronic music trio founded in 2006 by members John Elliott, Steve Hauschildt, and Mark McGuire. The band was based in Cleveland, Ohio and then in Portland, Oregon, United States.

== History ==
Emeralds' sound has been noted for drawing from ambient music, minimal music, and kosmische musik.

John Elliott, Steve Hauschildt and Mark McGuire began playing music together under the name Fancelions in 2005 in Cleveland's western suburbs of Bay Village and Westlake. Shortly thereafter, they re-formed as Emeralds, playing their first show under that name in June 2006. Since then the group has released over forty recordings on various independent labels. The album Does It Look Like I'm Here?, released on Editions Mego in 2010, is their most widely known release to date. It received the Best New Album designation from Pitchfork Media, the Album of the Year award from Drowned in Sound, and accolades from many other publications. Mark McGuire and Steve Hauschildt also perform and record under their own names, while John Elliott does so under a number of monikers including Outer Space and Imaginary Softwoods. The band also maintains multiple labels including McGuire & Elliott's Wagon, Hauschildt's Gneiss Things and Elliott's curated imprint Spectrum Spools.

Emeralds were invited by Godspeed You! Black Emperor to perform at the All Tomorrow's Parties festival in December 2010 and again in 2012 by The Afghan Whigs.

In April 2009, the band opened for Throbbing Gristle's reunion tour in Chicago and New York.

From 19 September through 31 October 2010, the band opened for Caribou on a North American tour.

In January 2013, Emeralds announced that Mark McGuire had left the band. Though initially expected to continue as a duo, just weeks later Steve Hauschildt announced his own departure, saying that "the band is now over".

After a decade-long absence; in November 2022, Primavera Sound announced the band were reunited and were to perform at the original Barcelona and new Madrid locations of the 2023 Spanish music festival.

== Discography ==
=== Albums ===
- Solar Bridge (Hanson Records, 2008) - CD/LP
- Emeralds (Hanson Records/Wagon/Gneiss Things, 2009) - CD/LP
- What Happened (No Fun Productions, 2009; Editions Mego, 2010) - CD/2xLP
- Does It Look Like I'm Here? (Editions Mego, 2010) - CD/2xLP
- Just to Feel Anything (Editions Mego, 2012) - CD/LP

=== EPs ===
- Demo no. 1 (Wagon, 2006) - CDr
- Demo no. 2 (Wagon, 2006) - CDr
- Hidden Field (Wagon, 2006) - CDr mini
- Dirt Weed Diaries Vol. 1 (Maim & Disfigure, 2006) - CDr
- Bullshit Boring Drone Band (American Tapes, 2006) - CDr
- No More Spirits Over The Lake (Wagon, 2006) - CDr
- Dirt Weed Diaries Vol. 2 (Maim & Disfigure, 2007) - CDr
- A Row of Exposed Columns (Chondritic Sound, 2007) - CDr mini
- Hallucinations (Wagon, 2007) - CDr mini
- Golden Swirl (Wagon, 2007) - CDr mini
- Ledges (Gneiss Things, 2007) - CDr
- Queen of Burbank Vol. 2 (Editions Brokenresearch, 2007) - CDr
- Live (Gneiss Things, 2008) - CDr
- Does It Look Like I'm Here? (Daphni Mixes) (Jiaolong, 2012) - 12"

=== Singles ===
- "Fresh Air" (A Soundesign Recording, 2009) - 7"
- "Candy Shoppe" / "The Cycle of Abuse" (Wagon/Gneiss Things, 2010) - 7"
- "Lake Effect Snow" / "Science Center" (Wagon/Gneiss Things, 2010) - 7"
- "In Love" / "Summerdata" (Wagon/Gneiss Things, 2010) - 7"
- "Shade" / "August" (Wagon/Gneiss Things, 2010) - 7"

=== Cassettes ===
- Laying Under Leaves (Wagon, 2006)
- Emeralds (Hanson Records, 2007)
- Smoke Signals (Wagon, 2007)
- Servant (Wagon, 2007)
- Grass Ceiling (Fag Tapes, 2007)
- A Real Clean Gang (Together Tapes, 2007)
- Allegory of Allergies (Gods of Tundra, 2007)
- Planetarium (Tapeworm Tapes, 2008)
- The Overlook (Wagon, 2009)

=== Split releases and collaborations ===
- with Tusco Terror (Tusco/Embassy 2006, 2007) - cass
- with Sam Goldberg (Wagon, 2007) - cass
- with Birds of Delay (Wagon, 2007) - cass
- with Sunburned Hand of the Man (Manhand, 2007) - cass
- with Tusco Terror (Ecstatic Peace!, 2008) - LP
- with Quintana Roo (Arbor, 2008) - LP
- Under Pressure with Aaron Dilloway (Hanson Records, 2008) - cass
- with Pain Jerk (No Fi, 2009) - CD

== See also ==
- List of ambient music artists
