= Mark McGuire =

American musician (born 1986)

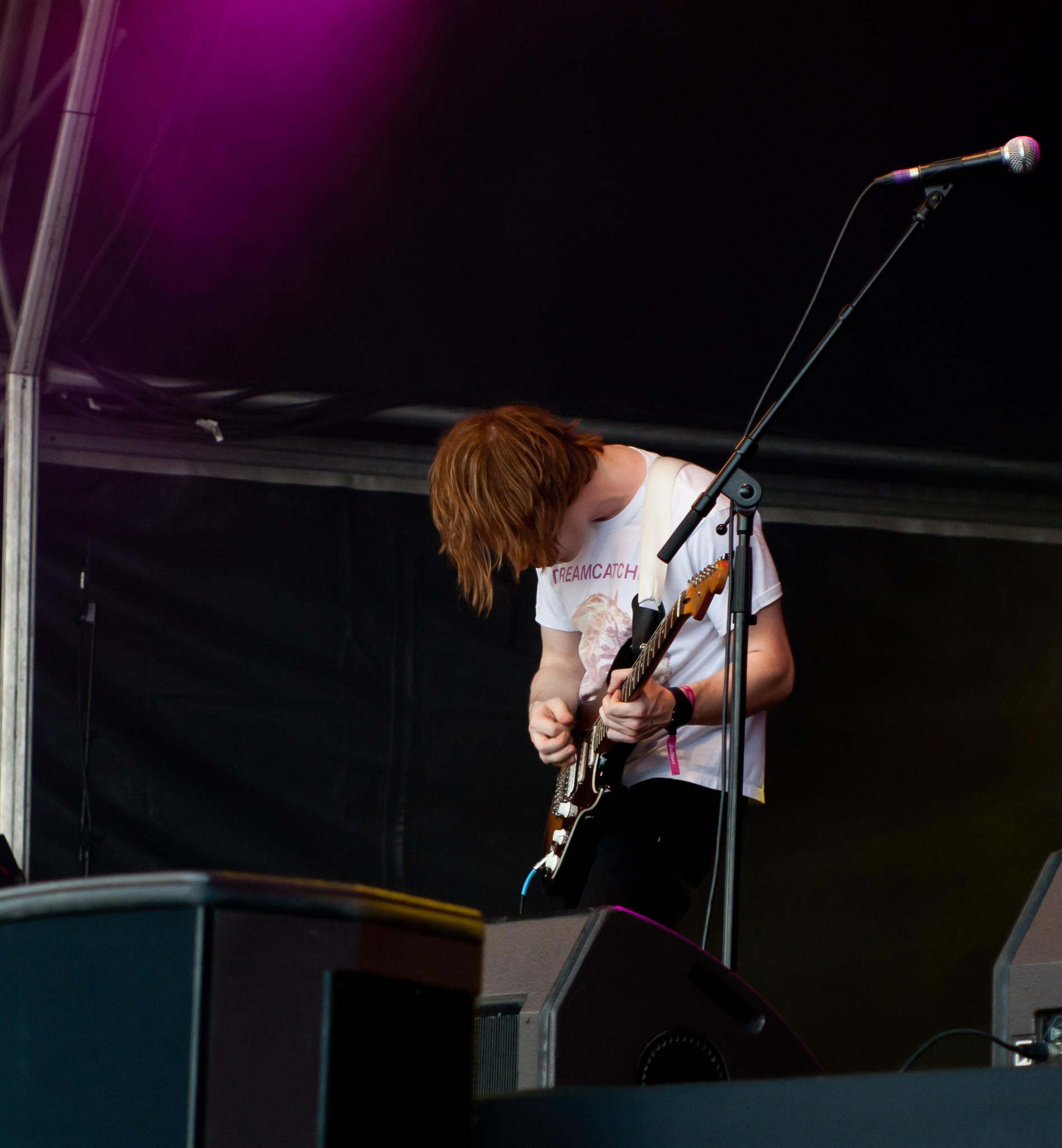
- Mark McGuire with Emeralds at the 2011 Primavera Sound Festival

Background information
- Born: December 31, 1986 (age 39); Cleveland, Ohio, U.S.
- Genres: Drone; Acoustic; Ambient music
- Instrument: Guitar
- Years active: 2007–present
- Labels: Editions Mego; Dead Oceans
- Website: "McGuire Music

Mark McGuire (born December 31, 1986) is an American musician. A former member of Emeralds, McGuire is a multi-instrumentalist who has been producing solo material since 2007. He has released three solo albums and produces mostly instrumental music that combines electronica and acoustic guitars with psychedelic influences. He has toured internationally as a solo artist supporting among others Julianna Barwick and Jenny Hval while playing headlining shows in Europe, North America, Japan and Australia.

== History ==
Originally from Cleveland, Ohio, McGuire first picked up a guitar at the age of 9 and played in a variety of high-school bands. In 2005 he started Emeralds with Steve Hauschildt and John Elliott but continued to work on his own material. Many of these recordings appeared on self-distributed CD-Rs and cassettes. His first release on a different label was a 5-track EP, Solo Acoustic Vol. 2, that was part of a Steve Lowenthal curated series of acoustic songs on the VDSQ label. The record received praise from among others Al Doyle of Hot Chip.

In 2010 he released his first regular solo album Living With Yourself that included various pieces and arrangements recorded over a three-year period. The album was "inspired by my family, the friends I've known the best throughout my life, and everything that has led me to where I am right now". The album appeared on the Austrian label editions Mego to generally favourable reviews.

In 2011 McGuire decided to leave his native city and moved to Portland, Oregon. In the same year, Peter Rehberg of editions Mego curated and edited a collection of the self-released material McGuire had accumulated of the years. Entitled A Young Person's Guide To Mark McGuire, it contained two discs with twenty selected tracks. Before leaving Cleveland, McGuire had begun work on his next solo album, Get Lost, completing it in the first months after the move. He described it as 'reflection of a lot that was going on inside my head at that time and the things that were happening around me'. Released in September 2011, the album was described by The New York Times as 'album is warm, well paced, reassuring, confident and manageable in length; it's also self-consciously naïve in feeling, floppy and weirdly distant'.

In January 2013 it was announced that McGuire had left Emeralds for unspecified reasons. In the course of the year, he moved to Los Angeles after completing his third solo album, Along the Way. Released on February 3, 2014, through Dead Oceans Records, McGuire described the album as 'about the journey of an individual entering the world, and his quest for true knowledge about the universe and about himself'. From 2013 to 2014 McGuire played with The Afghan Whigs, also appearing on their 2014 album Do to the Beast.

== Discography ==
=== Albums ===
- Unsettled Time (as The Bad Habit) (2006, Wagon)
- I'll Give You A Hint (as The Bad Habit) (2006, Wagon)
- Turned Against Over Time (as Cat Nap) (2006, Wagon)
- Spring Is Not Here (as Cat Nap) (2007, Wagon)
- Glass Bowls (2007, Wagon)
- Northern Exposure (2007, Wagon)
- Patterns of Development (2007, Wagon)
- People's Parties (as People's Parties) (2007, Cut Hands)
- Tidings (2007, Wagon)
- Amethyst Waves (2008, Wagon)
- An Old Hag's Cackle Pt. II (2008, Cylindrical Habitat Modules)
- Dream Team (2008, Wagon)
- Guitar Meditations (2008, Wagon)
- Off In The Distance (2008, Chondritic Sound)
- Let Us Be The Way We Were (2008, Wagon)
- Open Chords (2008, Pizza Night)
- The Garden Of Eternal Life (2008, Arbor)
- Tidings II (2009, Self-released)
- A Pocket Full Of Rain (2009, Pizza Night and Wagon; 2023, Husky Pants)
- VDSQ Solo Acoustic Vol. 2 (2009, Vin Du Select Qualitite)
- Losing Sleep (2009, Wagon)
- Must Not Have Meant That Much (2009, Wagon)
- Language Barrier (2009, Wagon)
- Guitar Meditations Vol. II (2009, Wagon)
- The Invisible World (2010, Cylindrical Habitat Modules)
- Get Me Out Of Here (2010, Durable Stimuli)
- Between Family (2010, Wagon)
- Things Fall Apart (2010, Wagon)
- Vacation Days (2010, Wagon)
- High Above The City (2010, High Spirits)
- Living With Yourself (2010, Editions Mego)
- Misunderstandings (2010, Deception Island)
- Get Lost (2011, Editions Mego)
- Nightshade (2012, Wagon)
- Tidings III (2013, Self-released)
- The Sounds of Xmas (2013, Self-released; originally released as a private-press CD-R for friends and family in 2006)
- Along the Way (2014, Dead Oceans)
- Beyond Belief (2015, Dead Oceans)
- Vision Upon Purpose (2017, Self-released)
- Ideas of Beginning (2017, Vin Du Select Qualitite)
- Do You Hear What I Hear (2018, Vin Du Select Qualitite)
- Nothing In This World (2020, Self-released)
- Earth Star Musick (2020, Aural Canyon)
- Our Family (2021, Self-released)

=== Singles & EPs ===
- Stranger Than Paradise (2009, Everyone Else Has A Record Label So Why Can't I?)
- Surrogate Channels (2012, Self-released)
- Noctilucence (2014, Dead Oceans)
- Mallards (as The Bad Habit) (2014, Self-released)
- Anhedonia (2024, Self-released)

=== Miscellaneous ===
- Moss Agate (Under Ground of Older Somewhere) (2014, Self-released)
- Nervous Systems (as Moon Day Night) (2014, Self-released)
- Wind One (as Moon Day Night) (2014, Self-released)
- First Thaw in Raining Creation (2015, Self-released)
- Quantum Quattro (as The Magi of Eire) (2016, Self-released)
- The Fertile World (as The Magi of Eire) (2016, Self-released)
- Locust Grove, OH (Alternate Universe) (2016, Self-released)
- Cool Cloudscapes of the Four Directions Vol. I - Side Ways - Sky Radio East (2016, Self-released)
- The Moon and the Loon Duck (as The Magi of Eire) (2016, Self-released)
- Rolling Hills (as The Magi of Eire) (2016, Self-released)
- The Sleep Watchers (as The Bad Dreamers) (2017, Self-released)
- Cynthiana (2016, Self-released)
- Warriors of the Rainbow (2016, Self-released)
- Sea of Shooting Stars (as The Magi of Eire) (2017, Self-released)
- Guitar Meditations Vol. III (2017, Self-released)
- Cool Cloudscapes of the Four Directions Vol. II - Still Moving - Sky Radio North (2017, Self-released)
- Sundance Dreams (as The Magi of Eire) (2017, Self-released)
- Mirage (2017, Self-released)
- Automatic Writing (2018, Self-released)
- Music for Sleeping: Volume One - Infants & Young Children (2018, Self-released)
- Music For Sleeping: Volume Two - All Ages (2018, Self-released)
- The Crystalline Tree (2018, Self-released)
- The Broken Home (2018, Self-released)
- In The Land of the Heartless (2019, Self-released)
- Kewl Cloudscapes of the Four Directions Vol. III - Way Even - Sky Radio South (2019, Self-released)
- Guitar Meditations Vol. IV (2019, Self-released)
- The Encounter (2019, Self-released)
- It's All The Same No Matter What (2019, Self-released)

=== Split releases and collaborations ===
- Nate Scheible / Mark McGuire with Nate Scheible (2007, Wagon)
- Prehistoric Blackout / Mark McGuire with Taylor Richardson a.k.a. Prehistoric Blackout (2008, Wagon)
- Sam Goldberg / Mark McGuire with Sam Goldberg (2010, Pizza Night)
- Trouble Books / Mark McGuire with Trouble Books (2011, Wagon)
- Certain Circumstances with Nate Scheible (2012, The Music Fellowship)

=== Compilations ===
- Tidings / Amethyst Waves (2010, Weird Forest Records)
- A Young Person's Guide to Mark McGuire (2011, Editions Mego)

=== Other projects ===
As a member of Amazing Births (with Julian Gulyas)

- Aisling Sistrunk (2010, Cylindrical Habitat Modules)
- Painted Glacier (2010, Cylindrical Habitat Modules)
- Younger Moon (2011, Cylindrical Habitat Modules)

As a member of Inner Tube (with Spencer Clark)

- Inner Tube (2012, Pacific City Sound Visions/Wagon)

As a member of Skyramps (with Daniel Lopatin)

- Days of Thunder (2009, Wagon)

As a member of Sun Watcher (with Shane Mackenzie)

- Gold (2008, High Spirits)
- Two and a Half Men (2008, Wagon)
- Red Hairs (2009, High Spirits)
- Sun Watcher (2009, Wagon)
