= Smegma (band) =

American experimental noise group

- Origin: Pasadena, California, U.S.
- Genres: Noise, free improvisation
- Years active: 1973–present
- Members: Ju Suk Reet Meate; Dennis Duck; Cheez-It-Ritz; Cheesebro; Amazon Bambi; Chucko Fats; Pizza Rioux; Iso; Dr. Id; Dr. Odd; Jerry; Foon; Ace Farren Ford; Electric Bill; Jerry A.; Arsene Zara; Borneo Jimmy; Burned Mind; Conroy; Oblivia; Victor Sparks; Harry Cess Poole; Samak Cosemano; Nour Morbarak; Madelyn Villano

Smegma is an American experimental noise group formed in Pasadena, California in 1973. Author Richard Meltzer became their vocalist in the late 1990s. The group was included in the Nurse with Wound list and was featured on the cover of the August 2006 edition of The Wire.

== Partial discography ==
- Sing Popular Songs (1974; 1998)
- Can't Look Straight/Flashcards (1979)
- Glamour Girl 1941 (1979)
- Soundtracks 1–5 (1980)
- Pigs for Lepers (1982)
- Nattering Naybobs of Negativity (1987)
- Smell the Remains (1988)
- Ism (1994)
- The Goodship Poleshiner (1995)
- The Mad Excitement, the Barbaric Pulsations, the Incomparable Rhythms of... (1996)
- Smegma Plays/Merzbow Plays Smegma (1996)
- Rumblings
- Tiromancy
- The Beast
- Thirty Years of Service
- Live at No Fun Fest
- One/Don't Tell Roberto
- The Good Fight/Blues for M./Self-Hypnosis
