= John Elliott (electronic musician) =

American electronic musician

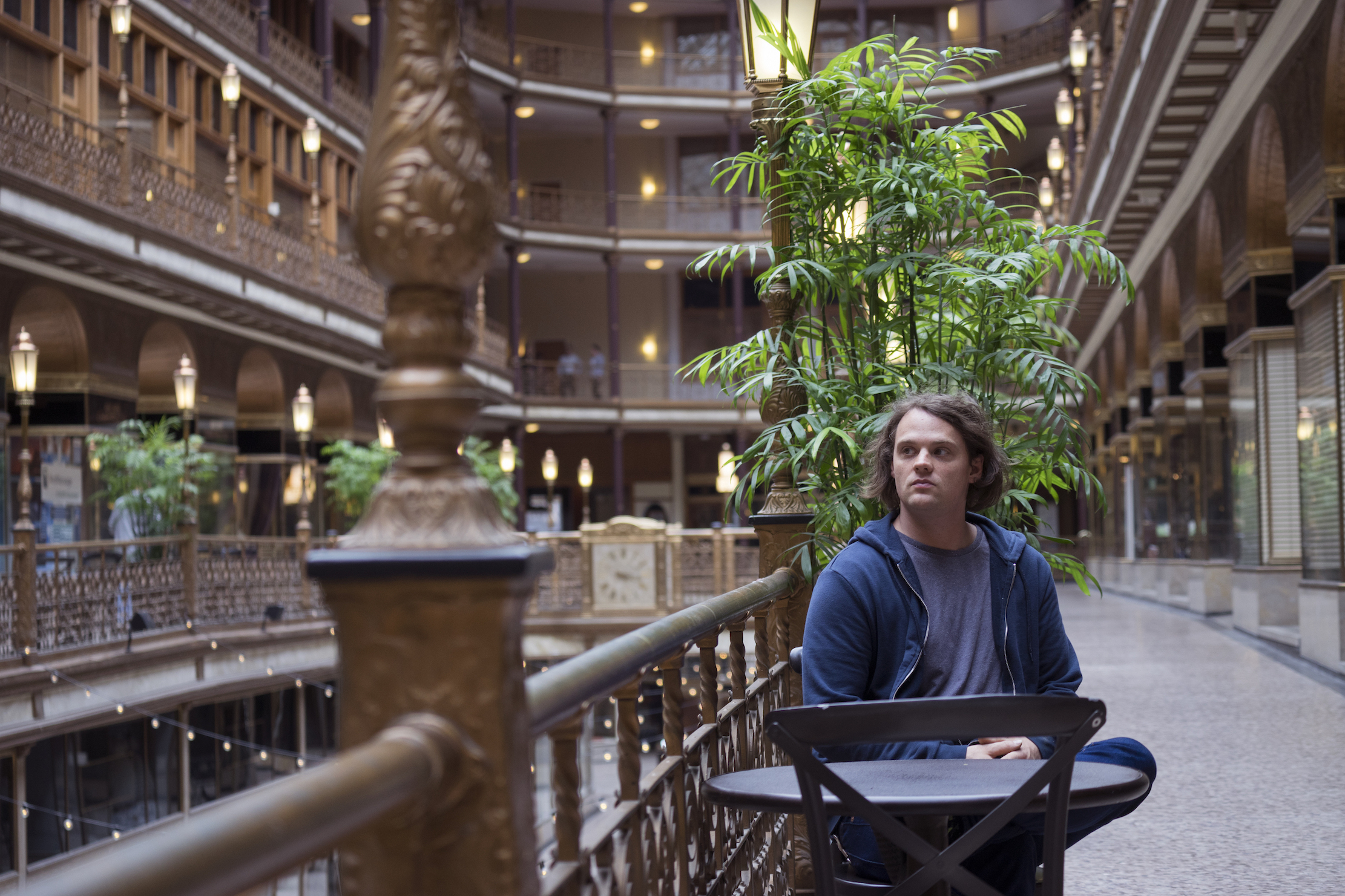
- Multidisciplinary artist John Elliott sitting in the Cleveland Arcade building in downtown Cleveland.

Background information
- Born: June 22, 1984 (age 42)
- Origin: Cleveland, Ohio
- Genres: Experimental, psychedelic, drone
- Occupation: Musician
- Instrument: Synthesizer
- Labels: Spectrum Spools, Wagon
- Member of: Imaginary Softwoods
- Formerly of: Emeralds, Mist, Outer Space, Organic Dial

John Elliott (born June 22, 1984) is an American multidisciplinary artist from Cleveland, Ohio. A former member of Emeralds, Elliott has been involved in a number of solo projects and collaborations including Imaginary Softwoods, Mist (with Sam Goldberg), Outer Space (with Andrew Veres), and Organic Dial (with Andrew Veres). Elliott also curated the electronic music label Spectrum Spools, as well as Wagon, a label he set up with Emeralds guitarist, Mark McGuire.

In 2016, Elliott won the Cleveland Arts Prize for Emerging Artist. On June 1, 2023, Elliott reunited with Emeralds to perform at Primavera Sound in Barcelona.

Elliott's music is synthesizer-based covering experimental, psychedelic, drone, kosmiche, musique concrète, and ambient genres.

== Discography ==
Imaginary Softwoods

- Imaginary Softwoods (2008)
- The Path of Spectrolite (2011)
- Annual Flowers in Color (2016)
- Gold Fiction Loop Garden (2016)
- The Suncoast Digest (2017)
- So Extra Bronze Lamp (2020)
- The Notional Pastures of Imaginary Softwoods (2023)
