= Steve Hauschildt =

American electronic musician (born 1984)

- Born: October 24, 1984 (age 42); Bay Village, Ohio, U.S.
- Origin: Cleveland, Ohio, U.S.
- Genres: Ambient, Electronic, Drone, Experimental
- Occupations: musician; producer
- Instruments: Synthesizer, digital audio workstation, keyboard, piano, drum machine, Modular synthesizer
- Years active: 2005–present
- Labels: Ghostly International, Kranky, Editions Mego
- Website: stevehauschildt.com

Steve Hauschildt (born October 24, 1984) is an American electronic musician based in Chicago. He is a member of the band Emeralds and has been releasing solo material since the mid-2000s.

== Career ==
While performing and recording as a trio, all members of Emeralds released solo material. Hauschildt released two albums under his own name in this period, The Summit and Critique of the Beautiful.

After the folding of Emeralds in 2013, Hauschildt's first widely distributed release arrived in 2011, when Kranky released his full-length Tragedy & Geometry. The album features heavy use of the Prophet '08 synthesizer, and is influenced by 1970s-era Kosmische musik. Its title is taken from the subjects governed by two of the Greek muses, Melpomene and Polyhymnia.

In 2012 a second album Sequitur was released, followed by the collection of outtakes and demos S/H on Editions Mego a year later. In the latter part of 2014, Hauschildt contributed the collection Air Texture IV together with BNJMN. In September 2015, he released the album Where All Is Fled, which marked a return with new material after a three-year absence.

In October 2016, Hauschildt released the album Strands.

The album Dissolvi was released August 3, 2018, on the Ghostly International label, and includes collaborations with GABI and Julianna Barwick.

== Discography ==
=== Studio albums ===
- Tragedy & Geometry (Kranky, 2011)
- Sequitur (Kranky, 2012)
- Where All Is Fled (Kranky, 2015)
- Strands (Kranky, 2016)
- Dissolvi (Ghostly International, 2018)
- Nonlin (Ghostly International, 2019)
- Aeropsia (Simul Records, 2025)

=== Compilation albums ===
- S/H (Editions Mego, 2013)

=== Miscellaneous ===
- The Summit (Gneiss Things, 2007)
- Rapt For Liquid Minister (Arbor, 2008)
- The Stairwell Is Long Gone (Deception Island, 2008)
- Resplendent (Taped Sounds, 2009)
- Critique of the Beautiful (Gneiss Things, 2009)
