= Lightning Bolt discography =

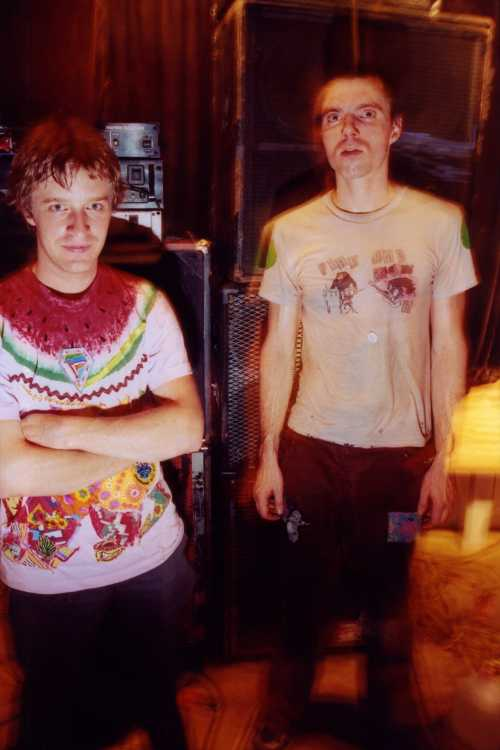
Brian Gibson and Brian Chippendale of Lightning Bolt.

Lightning Bolt is a noise rock duo from Providence, Rhode Island, composed of Brian Chippendale on drums and vocals and Brian Gibson on bass guitar. The group's discography consists of seven full-length studio albums and a number of 7-inch singles and splits. Lightning Bolt have also appeared on numerous compilations, starred in the 2003 tour-DVD The Power of Salad, and performed in DVD compilations such as Pick a Winner (Load Records, 2004) and Sleep When You are Dead by performance artists Mighty Robot (Contact Records, 2007).

== Albums ==
Year	Details
1999	Lightning Bolt: Label: Load (Load #26); Limited edition vinyl of 750 pressings.; 50-minute companion cassette titled "Zone" also released.; Re-issued on CD with "Zone" included.
2001	Ride the Skies: Label: Load (Load #31); Released: February 28, 2001
2003	Wonderful Rainbow: Label: Load Records (Load #41); Released: March 4, 2003
2005	Hypermagic Mountain: Label: Load (Load #78); Released: October 18, 2005
2009	Earthly Delights: Label: Load (Load #126); Released: October 13, 2009
2015	Fantasy Empire: Label: Thrill Jockey; Released: March 24, 2015
2019	Sonic Citadel: Label: Thrill Jockey; Released: October 11, 2019

== Collaborative albums ==
Year	Details
2026	The Horizon Spirals / The Horizon Viral: Label: Thrill Jockey; Split LP with OOIOO; Released: April 24, 2026

== Extended plays ==
Year	Details
2012	Oblivion Hunter: Label: Load (Load#142); Released: September 25, 2012

=== 7-inch records ===
Year	Release details
1997	Split: Label: Load Records (Load #14); Split with Forcefield
2000	Conan: Label: Load Records (Load #29); Also known as Tour 7"
2006	Ultra Cross Vol. 1: Label: Ki/oon Records, Sony Japan; Split CD with Guitar Wolf; Released in Japan only

=== Collaborative extended plays ===
Year	Title	Track(s)	Label	Other
2011	The Flaming Lips 2011 #7: The Flaming Lips with Lightning Bolt (4-song 12" vinyl EP)	4-songs co-written and performed with The Flaming Lips	Warner Bros./Lovely Sorts of Death	

== Singles ==
Year	Details
2013	"Barbarian Boy": Label: [adult swim]; Released: August 5, 2013; Released as part of the Adult Swim Singles Program 2013

== DVD / video ==
Year	Video details
2003	The Power of Salad: Label: Load Records (Load #40); Directed by Peter Glantz and Nick Noe

== Appearances on compilations ==
Year	Title	Track(s)	Label	Other
1996	Repopulation Program	"Revenge"	Load Records	Only official release with Hisham Bharoocha.
1999	Fruited Other Surfaces	"LB.3.K6K3GU3.GO"	Vermiform Records	
1999	You're Soaking in It	"Diet of Grapes and Nuts"	Load Records	
2000	Bad Music for Bad People	"Rotata-ville"	Trash Art!	
2000	Mish Mash Mush Mega Mix Vol. 3	"Race Back to Earth"	Fort Thunder	
2001	U.S. Pop Life Vol. 7: Random Access Music Machine	"Untitled"	Contact Records	
2001	U.S Pop Life Vol. 12: Tribute to Fort Thunder	"Pee Filled Longstockings"	Contact Records	Early version of "Longstockings" on Wonderful Rainbow
2001	KFJC Live from the Devil's Triangle Vol. III	"Untitled"	KFJC	First 2 minutes of Wee Ones Parade, but is a live recording
2001	Real Slow Radio	"Jam at the Parlor"	Fort Thunder	Early version of "2 Towers" on Wonderful Rainbow
2001	Old Tyme Lemonade	"Swarm"	Hospital Productions	Chippendale side-project Mindflayer also appears.
2001	Troubleman Mix-Tape	"Waiting for the Snake Assassin"	Troubleman Unlimited Records	Song eventually became "Assassins" on Wonderful Rainbow
2001	Mish Mash Mush Vol. 7	"Luxery Tomb"	Fort Thunder	
2002	Don't Shoot the Toy Piano Player	"13 Monsters"	WFMU	
2002	If The Twenty-First Century Didn't Exist, It Would Be Necessary To Invent It	"Ride The Friendly Skies"	5RC	
2002	U.S. Pop Life Vol. 12: Random Slice of Life at Ft. Thunder – Bands Who Played At	"Untitled"	Contact Records	
2004	Pick a Winner (DVD and CD)	Live performance	Load Records	
2005	I Love Guitar Wolf...Very Much	"Planet of the Wolves"	Narnack Records	
2005	A Benefit For Our Friends (DMBQ Tribute CD)	"Excitebike"	none	
2006	Rough Trade Shops: Rock and Roll 1	"Riffwraiths"	V2 Records	
2007	Ex Drummer	"2 Morro Morro Land"	Play It Again Sam	
2007	The Supermassive Selection CD by Muse	"Magic Mountain"	New Musical Express	CD accompanying NME Magazine, June 16, 2007.
2007	Sleep When You are Dead by Mighty Robot (DVD)	Live performance	Contact Records	
2007	Cue the Bugle Turbulent (The 2007 Believer Music Issue CD)	"Deceiver"	The Believer	

== Music videos ==
Title	Year	Director(s)
"The Metal East"	2015	
"Blow To The Head"	2019	Caleb Wood

== See also ==
- Load Records discography
