= Load Records discography =

Load Records was an independent record label based out of Providence, Rhode Island, specializing in noise and experimental music. Load Records was started in 1993 by Ben McOsker in order to release a 7-inch record for the band Boss Fuel. The label quickly became the most prominent source for noise music coming out of the Providence scene, issuing over 100 releases until folding in 2017.

Bands such as Lightning Bolt, Noxagt, Sightings, Landed, Arab on Radar, Brainbombs, The White Mice, and Pink and Brown released records through Load. Load Records also re-released records originating from other labels, such as the United States release of Close Calls with Brick Walls by Andrew W.K. and the vinyl editions of The Very Best of Men's Recovery Project by Men's Recovery Project and Things Viral by Khanate.

== Catalog ==
This list is organized by catalog number, a roughly chronological number system established by the label and typically printed on or assigned to each official release.

Year	No.	Artist	Title	Co-releases
1993	1	Boss Fuel	Just Like Everybody Else Would / Bender	
1993	2	Von Ryan Express	Up on the Block	
1994	3	Boss Fuel	The Ride / Rumble Mambo	
1994	4	Golden Touch	Hits the Sweet Spot	
1995	5	Pistolwhip	Devil Deep / Seeing Red	
1995	6	Thee Hydrogen Terrors	The Erotic Adventures of Thee Hydrogen Terrors	
1996	7	The Scissor Girls	So that You can Start to See what S-T-A-T-I-C-L-A-N-D	
1996	8	Six Finger Satellite	Clone Theory	
1996	9	various artists	Repopulation Program	
1996	10	Thee Hydrogen Terrors	Terror, Diplomacy & Public Relations	
1996	11			
1997	12	Lightning Bolt / Forcefield	split	
1997	13	Olneyville Sound System	Because We Are All In It Together	
1997	13	John Von Ryan	Organs vs. Furniture	
1997	14	Gerty Farish	Bulks Up	
1997	15	Olneyville Sound System	Because We're All In It Together	
1997	16			
1998	17	Astoveboat	New Bedford	
1998	18	Landed	Dairy 4 Dinner	
1999	19	Brainbombs	Singles Compilation	
2000	20	Men's Recovery Project	Bolides over Basra	
1999	22	Brainbombs	Urge to Kill	
1998	23	Arab on Radar	Swimming with a Hard-On	
1998	24	Pleasurehorse	Dropdead Deconstructed	Over the Counter Records
1999	25	various artists	You're Soaking in It	
1999	26	Lightning Bolt	Lightning Bolt	
1999	27	Brainbombs	Singles Compilation	
	28	—	—	
2000	29	Lightning Bolt	Conan	
2000	30	Mystery Brinkman / Pleasurehorse	split	
2001	31	Lightning Bolt	Ride the Skies	
2003	32	Hawd Gankstuh Rappuhs; MC's (Wid Ghatz)	Wake Up and Smell the Piss	
2001	33	Vaz	Demonstrations in Micronesia	
2001	34	Brainbombs	Cheap	
2002	35	Sightings	Sightings	
2002	36	Pink and Brown / Death Drug	split	
2002	37	Olneyville Sound System	What is True, What is False	
2003	38	Forcefield	Roggaboggas	
2003	39	Pleasurehorse	Bareskinrug	
2003	40	Lightning Bolt	The Power of Salad	
2003	41	Lightning Bolt	Wonderful Rainbow	
2003	42	Neon Hunk	Smarmymob	
	43	Pink and Brown	Shame Fantasy II LP	
2003	44	Noxagt	Turning it Down Since 2001	
2003	45	Pink and Brown	Shame Fantasy II	
2003	46	Friends Forever	Killball	
2003	47	Viki / Hair Police	split	
2003	48	Sightings	Absolutes	
2003	49	Khanate	No Joy (Remix)	
2004	50	various artists	Pick a Winner	
2003	51	Vincebus Eruptum	Vincebus Eruptum	
2003	52	Mr. California and the State Police	Audio Hallucinations	
2003	53	Kites	Royal Paint with the Metallic Gardener from the United States Helped into an Open Field by Women and Children	
2003	54	Total Shutdown	The Album	Tigerbeat6
2003	55	Khanate	Things Viral	Southern Lord Records
2003	56	The USA Is a Monster	Tasheyana Compost	
2004	57	Noxagt	The Iron Point	
2004	58	Necronomitron	Necronomitron	
2005	59	Mindflayer	It's Always 1999	Ooo Mau Mau Records
2004	60	Metalux	Waiting for Armadillo	
2004	61	Nautical Almanac	Rooting for the Microbes	
2004	62	Kites / Prurient	split	
2004	63	Fat Day	Unf! Unf!	
2004	64	Burmese	Men	
2004	65	Sightings	Arrived in Gold	
2005	66	The White Mice	ASSPhIXXXEATEASHUN	
2005	67	Coughs	Fright Makes Right	
2005	68	Excepter	Throne	
2006	69	Noxagt	Noxagt	
2005	70	Ultralyd	Chromosome Gun	
2005	71	Hospitals	I've Visited the Islands of Jocks and Jazz	
2005	72	Prurient	Black Vase	
2006	73	Vampire Can't	Key Cutter	
2006	74	Fat Worm of Error	Pregnant Babies Pregnant with Pregnant Babies	
2005	75	Men's Recovery Project	The Very Best of Men's Recovery Project	5 Rue Christine
2005	76	The USA Is a Monster	Wohaw	
	77	—	—	
2005	78	Lightning Bolt	Hypermagic Mountain	
2006	79	Impractical Cockpit	To be Treated	
2006	80	Wizardzz	Hidden City of Taurmond	
2005	81	Kites	Peace Trials	
2006	82	Metalux / John Wiese	Exoteric	
	83	—	—	
2006	84	The USA Is a Monster	Sunset at the End of the Industrial Age	
	85	—	—	
2006	86	Diskaholics	Live in Japan, v.1	
2006	87	various artists	Fun From None: Live at the No; Fun Fest 2004 - 2005	
2006	88	Coughs	Secret Passage	
2006	89	Barkley's Barnyard Critters	Mystery Tail	
2006	90	Yellow Swans	Psychic Secession	
2006	91	OvO	Miastenia	
	92	—	—	
2006	93	Landed	Times I Despise	
2006	94	Gang Wizard	Byzantine Headache	
2006	95	Paper Rad	Trash Talking	
2007	96	Yellow Swans	At All Ends	
2007	97	Justice Yeldham	Live in School	
2006	98	Noise Nomads	Noise Nomads	
2007	99	The White Mice	BLasssTPhlEgMEICE	
	100	—	—	
2006	101	Prurient	Pleasure Ground	
2008	102	Shit and Shine	Küss Mich, Meine Liebe	
2007	103	Mouthus	Saw a Halo	
2007	104	Silver Daggers	New High & Ord	
2007	105	Hetero Skeleton	En La Sombre Del Pejaro Velludo	
2007	106	Air Conditioning	Dead Rails	
2007	107	Sword Heaven	Entrance	
2007	108	Monotract	Trueno Oscuro	
2007	109	Clockcleaner	Babylon Rules	
2009	110	Homostupids	The Load	
2007	111	Andrew W.K.	Close Calls with Brick Walls	Universal Records
2007	112	Business Lady	Torture Footage	
2007	113	Kites	Hallucination Guillotine / Final Worship	
2007	114	DJ Scotch Egg	Drumized	
2007	115	Landed	How Little Will it Take	
	116	—	—	
	117	—	—	
	118	—	—	
2007	119	Sightings	Through the Panama	Ecstatic Peace!
2009	120	OvO	Croce Via	
2008	121	Harry Pussy	You'll Never Play This Town Again	
2008	122	The USA Is a Monster	Space Programs	
2009	123	Rusted Shut	Dead	
2009	124	—	—	
2009	125	Six Finger Satellite	Half Control	
2009	126	Lightning Bolt	Earthly Delights	
2010	127	Tinsel Teeth	Trash As The Trophy	
2010	128	—	—	
2010	129	Sword Heaven	Gone	
2010	130	Clockcleaner	Auf-Wiedersehen	
2010	131	Daily Life	Necessary And Pathetic	
2010	132	—	—	
2011	133	Black Pus	Primordial Pus	
2011	134	Ed Schrader's Music Beat	"Sermon" b/w "Rats" 7"	
2011	135	Sex Church	Growing Over	
2011	136	Skoal Kodiak	Kryptonym Bodliak	
2011	137	—	—	
2012	138	FNU Ronnies	Saddle Up	
2012	139	Ed Schrader's Music Beat	Jazz Mind	
2012	140	White Load	Wayne's World 3 b/w Godfather 4	
2012	141	White Suns	Sinews	
2012	142	Lightning Bolt	Oblivion Hunter	
2013	143	Dead Air	Dead Air	
2013	144	Humanbeast	Venus Ejaculates into the Banquet	
2013	145	Whore Paint	Swallow My Bones	
2014	146	Timeghost	Cellular	
2015	147	Tropical Trash	UFO Rot	
2016	148	Finished	Cum Inside Me Bro	

"—" denotes unassigned catalog numbers.
