= Peter Glantz =

American dramatist

- Born: New York City, New York
- Occupations: film/video/theater director, screenwriter
- Years active: 2001-present

Peter Glantz is an American director of theater and film, notably the films Lightning Bolt - Power Of Salad and the music video DVD Pick A Winner, both released through the record label Load Records.

== About ==
He recently co-wrote, wrote and directed a series for MTV's Liquid Television and directed the band OK Go's touring show. He has produced a number of documentaries for the Service Employees International Union and Change to Win, in particular Beyond The Spin, which documented the race for the 2004 Democratic Nomination and won a National Labor Council award for excellence in documentary filmmaking. His theater work includes directing the comedy group Killing My Lobster in San Francisco and the theater collective trutheatertheater that features artists and musicians from the Providence, RI and Fort Thunder communities. In October, 2010, Glantz collaborated with Randy Weiner to co-direct "The Most Interesting Show In The World", a variety show that toured 17 U.S. cities. In 2010, he began performing "Being Impossible", a show that he created and performs. In 2012, he premiered his multimedia performance "The World" at the Hirshhorn Museum and Sculpture Garden in Washington D.C.

== Filmography ==
=== Movies ===
- Lightning Bolt - Power Of Salad (2003) (with Nick Noe)
- Beyond The Spin (2003)
- The Mission To Save Spring (2003) (with Jo Dery)
- Pick A Winner (2004)
- 1000 Years of Popcorn (2005) (with Jo Dery)

=== TV commercials ===
- Play The Game (Get out the vote) (2004)
- Got Tuition? (2008)

=== Music videos ===
- Soccer Moms by Pink and Brown (2004)
- Creation Story by Black Elf Speaks (2004)
- No More Forever by The USA is a Monster (2009)
- Like A Prayer by Lavender Diamond (2009)
- I Want To See You Go Wild by Andrew W.K. and drawn by Gunsho (2010)
- Sunloathe by Wilco (2012)

=== Television and Internet Series ===
- "Worldword" (2010–present)
- "Liquid Television" (2013)
- "We Can Do It!" (2012)

== Controversy ==
The television commercial Play the Game, which featured art and animation from Ben Jones of Paper Rad, was censored by Viacom a few days after its CEO, Sumner Redstone endorsed George W. Bush for President. This resulted in protests in front of Viacom headquarters in Times Square. It was of particular concern because Viacom owns most of the youth-oriented television networks, like MTV, BET, VH1, and Comedy Central.

== Theater ==
He co-wrote (with Rob Erickson, a.k.a. Lumberob) the annual Brownbrokers musical waternowater, and wrote and directed for the comedy group Out Of Bounds. In 2003 he directed the original comedy show Walks This Way for the San Francisco comedy group Killing My Lobster, winning an SF Bay Guardian award for its cast. In 2006, Peter co-directed and co-wrote with Becky Stark The Most Beautiful Show That Ever Lived, featuring Miranda July, Ron Rege, Jr., Jim Drain, and more.

In 2010, Glantz co-directed with Randy Weiner "The Most Interesting Show In The World", a touring variety show starring Andrew W.K. and featuring acts including escape artist David Merlini, contortionists from the Dream World Cirque, and visual innovator Bubble Boy. He also began performing a solo show, "Being Impossible", with notable shows at Whartscape, Dixon Place in New York City, and Foo Fest.

=== trutheatertheater ===
Glantz founded trutheatertheater, called "an elusive troupe of actors, silkscreeners, puppeteers, noisemakers, musicians, videographers and illusionists from Providence, Rhode Island whose performances are akin to mystical rites of passage that is the digestive process of transforming truth into theater." They are known for performing in illegal locations, including abandoned buildings and public parks. They have performed legitimately at Future Friends festival, the RISD museum as part of "Wunderground: Providence 1995-2005", and in the King Lear festival hosted by Puppet Uprising and The Missoula Oblongata. In 2004, Free Matter For The Blind (label run by Mudboy) released a recording of Travel Light Light Keepers.

Trutheatertheater collaborators include Erin Rosenthal, Leif Goldberg, Erik Talley, Dave Lifrieri, Rich Porter, Rob Coggeshall, Mat Brinkman, Brian Chippendale, Kasey Henneman, Jim Frain, Jenny Nichols, Jo Dery, Roby Newton, and the Misstakes dance troupe. They include members of the bands Forcefield, Urdog, Lightning Bolt, Mindflayer, Milemarker, Manbeard, Black Pus, Wizardzz, and Bug Sized Mind.

=== Selected productions ===
- Time Dies When Your Fun Fun
- Travel Light, Light Keepers
- This Fun Fun Life
- Killing My Lobster Walks This Way
- The Most Beautiful Show That Ever Lived
- "The Most Interesting Show In The World"
- "Being Impossible"
- "The World"

== Early career ==
Glantz's first job in film was as Roger Corman's assistant. He worked on the writing and production of 9 films and the TV series Black Scorpion.

== Biographical details ==
Peter Glantz was born on the winter solstice. He currently lives in the only house in Lincoln Woods State Park, Rhode Island. He lives with his partner Meredith Stern and their cats Magellan (a.k.a. Jello) and Gandalf (a.k.a. The Ghost). Stern is a member of the Justseeds artist collective.
