= Encyclopedia of Hardcore Chiptune =

Studio album by DJ Scotch Egg
- Released: 2007
- Recorded: 16 July 2007
- Label: De-fragment Records

DJ Scotch Egg chronology
Scotchausen (2005)	Encyclopedia of Hardcore Chiptune (2007)	Drumized (2008)

Encyclopedia of Hardcore Chiptune (Japanese: スコッチエッグのハードコア・チップチューン大百科) is a Japanese compilation album from DJ Scotch Egg. It was released on 16 July 2007. The album collects songs from the first two albums (KFC Core and Scotch Hausen) and also includes some additional interludes, two videos and remixes.

== Track listing ==
No.	Title	Length
1.	"ハードコア・チップチューン大百科1"	0:20
2.	"KFC Song"	1:40
3.	"Scotch Forest"	2:02
4.	"Scotch Land"	1:05
5.	"Scotch Attack"	2:04
6.	"ハードコア・チップチューン大百科2"	0:12
7.	"Scotch Bach 2"	1:14
8.	"Scotch Bach"	2:01
9.	"Pin-Pon"	0:29
10.	"Scotch"	1:56
11.	"Chicken"	2:39
12.	"Tetric Wonderland"	1:44
13.	"Up & Down"	0:04
14.	"Scotch Heads"	2:09
15.	"静かにしてください"	0:04
16.	"Scotch Grime"	2:13
17.	"Scotch Ruins"	1:15
18.	"Scotch Bach 4"	1:44
19.	"またね!"	0:06
20.	"Scotch Sundance 3"	6:50
21.	"宿題1"	0:07
22.	"宿題2"	0:32
23.	"Scotch Bach (Ove-Naxx Remix)"	1:28
24.	"宿題3"	0:16
25.	"Scotch Forest (Doddodo & DJ Mighty Mars Remix)"	3:26
26.	"宿題4"	0:08
27.	"Scotch Gulp (DJ Booth Remix)"	2:26
28.	"宿題5"	0:11
29.	"Egg'n Colonel Sanders (KA4U Remix)"	1:44
30.	"宿題6"	0:08
31.	"Bogutch Forest (Bogulta Remix)"	2:58
32.	"Gig Booking"	1:41
33.	"Scotch Bach (video)"	2:30
34.	"Scotch Chicken"	2:47
Total length:		52:22
