= The Power of Salad =

- DVD Cover
- Directed by: Peter Glantz; Nick Noe
- Starring: Brian Gibson; Brian Chippendale
- Music by: Lightning Bolt
- Distributed by: Load Records – LOAD #40
- Release date: June 28, 2002
- Running time: 83 minutes
- Country: United States
- Language: English

The Power of Salad, also known as The Power of Salad & Milkshakes, is a film by Peter Glantz and Nick Noe, featuring and documenting the Providence, Rhode Island noise rock band Lightning Bolt. The film follows the avant-garde duo, Brian Gibson and Brian Chippendale, through a tour of the states, along with interviews of the band and their friends and family.

Live performances, for which Lightning Bolt is renowned, were shot from June 2–21 and July 14–15, 2001. These performances were held in, in the order they were listed:

- Washington, D.C.
- Houston, Texas
- Davis, California
- Philadelphia, Pennsylvania
- Lubbock, Texas
- Providence, Rhode Island
- New Orleans, Louisiana
- Brooklyn, New York
- Oakland, California
- San Diego, California
- Chapel Hill, North Carolina
- Shreveport, Louisiana
- Charlotte, North Carolina
- Austin, Texas
- Phoenix, Arizona
- Los Angeles, California
- San Francisco, California
- Mobile, Alabama
- Fort Sumner, New Mexico
- Fort Thunder, Rhode Island

Appearances, interviews, and cameos are made by Pink and Brown, Dave Auchenbach, and Load Records founder Ben McOsker.

A music video to "13 Monsters" by Paper Rad and Dearraindrop and one to “St. Jacques” by Devin Flynn is also included on the DVD.
