= Brian Gibson (musician) =

American musician

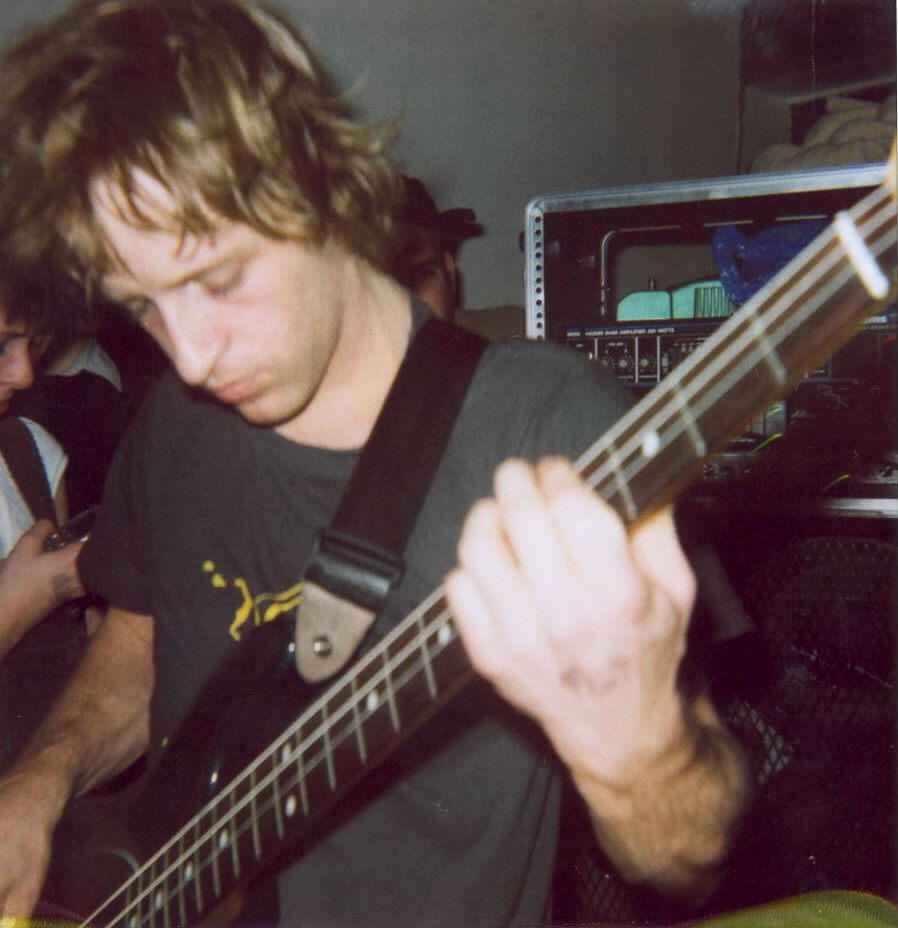

Background information
- Born: July 25, 1975 (age 50)
- Origin: Providence, Rhode Island
- Genres: Noise rock
- Occupation: Musician
- Instruments: Bass guitar, drums
- Labels: Load, Thrill Jockey

Brian Gibson (born July 25, 1975) is an American musician, artist, and video game designer based in Providence, Rhode Island. Gibson is best known as the bassist for the band Lightning Bolt. In the summer of 2015 he co-founded the game development company Drool. At Drool, he created the art and music for the video game Thumper and co-designed the game alongside Marc Flury. Thumper was released with critical acclaim in October 2016. He was previously a lead artist working at video game company Harmonix since 2001, but quit in the summer of 2015.

== Sound ==
Brian Gibson is particularly known for his unique and complex set-up, tuning, and use of his bass guitar. The majority of Gibson's playing draws on fairly simple loops and major/minor chord structures, yet also employs more advanced guitar techniques, such as tapping. Gibson’s bass guitar is normally tuned to standard cello tuning in intervals of fifths (C G D A E), with the high A and E strings being banjo strings. Gibson uses a high amount of distortion, feedback and effects. In juxtaposition to Chippendale's frenetic drums, Gibson's playing often acts as a rhythm section of sorts. With the use of his many effect pedals, Gibson often creates multiple layers of his own bass riffs. Due to the high level of distortion used, "lead" playing style, and high register tuning of his instrument, Gibson is often mistaken for a guitarist. Gibson is primarily a fingerstyle bassist. Gibson has mentioned The Who’s bassist, John Entwistle as an influence.

== Equipment ==
According to Gibson, his bass guitar is set to standard cello tuning, in intervals of fifths (C G D A) with a banjo string for the high A (contrasted with the typical bass guitar tuning of E A D G). He used this four-string setup for several years, but has recently been using a five-string setup, tuned to C G D A E, with banjo strings for the A and E. The banjo string is also tuned down an octave.

Gibson also uses several effects pedals, including a bass whammy pedal (pitch shifter), an octaver, two overdrive pedals, and more recently a delay pedal. A complete list of equipment Gibson typically uses, in order, is:

- 5-String Music Man StingRay
- DigiTech Bass Whammy pedal
- BOSS OC-2 Octave pedal
- BOSS ODB-3 Bass Overdrive pedal
- BOSS SD-1 Overdrive pedal
- Line 6 DL-4 Delay modeler
- Ampeg SVT4 Pro with 4x10 cabinet
- Crown Macro-Tech MA-3600VZ power amp
- More cabinets ranging from 18" to 4x10

As of 2007, Gibson has added a Boss PW-10 wah-wah pedal to his touring gear. In The Power of Salad DVD, Brian says his rig is rated to 3000 watts.

== Selected discography ==
- Lightning Bolt (1999)
- Ride the Skies (2001)
- The Power of Salad (2002)
- Wonderful Rainbow (2003)
- Hypermagic Mountain (2005)
- Hidden City of Taurmond (Load) (2006)
- Earthly Delights (2009)
- Megasus (2009)
- Menace of the Universe (2011)
- Oblivion Hunter (2012)
- Fantasy Empire (2015)
- Thumper OST (2016)
- Sonic Citadel (2019)
