= Drumized =

Studio album by DJ Scotch Egg
- Released: 2008
- Genre: Gabber, chiptune, noise
- Label: Load Records

DJ Scotch Egg chronology
Encyclopedia of Hardcore Chiptune (2007)	Drumized (2008)

Drumized is the third release by Chiptune and noise artist DJ Scotch Egg, which was released on Load Records. The album features a more abrasive sound similar to Scotch Dub and KFC Core. There is also experimentation with Circuit Bending and live instruments, one of which was played by Anders Hana of Noxagt and formerly of Jaga Jazzist.

== Track listing ==
1. WWWWW
2. Drumized
3. Countdown 1, 2, 3
4. Scotch Circus
5. Scotch Grind
6. Scotch Phantom
7. Scotch Boogy
8. Yeah, Final Yo
9. Scotch Metronorm
10. Scotch Circus 2
11. Scotch Grind 2
12. Scotch Beatbox (beatbox by Ned)
13. Scotch Jazz (with Anders Hana)
14. Scotch Stoner
15. Scotch Jazzzzz
16. Ummmmm.............
