= Live Action (disambiguation) =

Live action is term in cinematography.

Live Action may refer to:

- Live! Action, a live album by jazz saxophonist Willis Jackson recorded in 1964
- Live Action (album), a 1992 album by Dive
- Live action role-playing game
- Live Action (organization), American anti-abortion activist organization
- "Live Action", an alternative title for "Last Last One Forever and Ever", an episode of Aqua Teen Hunger Force

== See also ==
- Live Action Set, American performance company
- Live Action at ROCK ALL, Oslo, 1994
