= Pistolwhip =

Pistol-whipping is the act of using a handgun as a blunt weapon.

Pistolwhip or Pistol Whip may also refer to:

- Pistol Whip, a 2019 video game
- Pistolwhip, a graphic novel series by Matt Kindt and Jason Hall
- Pistol whipping, a professional wrestling strike
- "Pistolwhip", a 2000 song by Joshua Topolsky
- "PISTOLWHIP", a 2021 song by Spill Tab
- Pistolwhip, an artist in the Load Records discography

== See also ==
- Pistol Whipped, a 2008 American action film
