= Scotchausen =

Scotch Hausen

Studio album by DJ Scotch Egg
- Released: 2007
- Recorded: March 12, 2007
- Label: Wrong Music; Adaadat; Very Friendly

DJ Scotch Egg chronology
KFC Core (2005)	Scotch Hausen (2007)	スコッチエッグのハードコア・チップチューン大百科 (2007)

Scotch Hausen is an album from Chiptune/Breakcore artist DJ Scotch Egg. some of his tracks on this album are remakes of Johann Sebastian Bach, Karlheinz Stockhausen, Terry Riley, Philip Glass and Moondog, and features a less abrasive sound than the first album. The song 'Scotch Ruins' is an earlier tune that was untitled and Shige used to play live, and it has been remastered for this album.

== Track listing ==
1. Intro
2. Scotch Bach 2
3. Scotch Hausen
4. Scotch Ruins
5. Scotch Bach
6. Pin-Pon
7. No Beats
8. Scotch Sundance
9. Scotch Radio
10. Scotch Sundance 2
11. Scotch Sundance 3
12. Scotch Moondog

== Remakes ==
- 'Intro' is a remake of Wolfgang Amadeus Mozart's Eine Kleine Nachtmusik.
- 'Scotch Bach' is a remake of Johann Sebastian Bach's Toccata and Fugue in D minor.
- Likewise, 'Scotch Sundance' is based on Bach's Little Fugue in G minor, BWV 578.
