= Mindflayer (band) =

American noise rock band

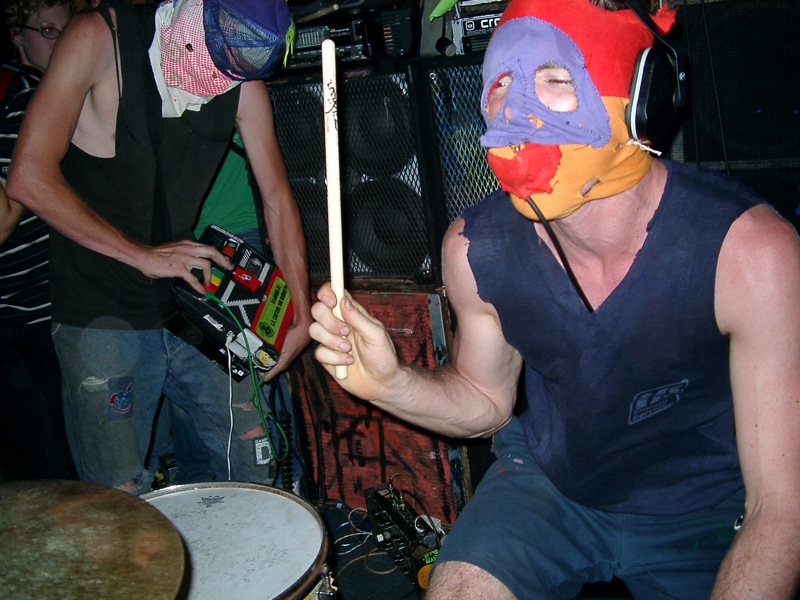
- Brinkman (left) and Chippendale (right) of Mindflayer

Background information
- Origin: Providence, Rhode Island
- Genres: Noise rock
- Years active: 1996–present
- Labels: Load, Corleone, Bulb, Ooo Mau Mau
- Members: Mat Brinkman; Brian Chippendale

Mindflayer is a noise rock band from Providence, Rhode Island, made up of Brian Chippendale (of Lightning Bolt) and Mat Brinkmann (of Forcefield) which was formed out of Fort Thunder.

Much of Mindflayer's identity, including the band name, are obscure Dungeons & Dragons references. The name of the band refers to psionic creatures in the Dungeons & Dragons universe, Illithids, commonly referred to as "mind flayers." The covers of Take Your Skin Off and Die & Mold Services also resemble the Illithid's squid-like faces. The title to the band's fourth album, Expedition to the Hairier Peaks, plays on the popular Dungeons & Dragons module title, Expedition to the Barrier Peaks. Mat Brinkman uses a circuit bent analog synthesizer.

== Discography ==
=== Self-released ===
- Raise Your Tentacles and Yell! (released on official website) (2000)
- Live CD-R (released on official website) (Bulb) (2000/2001)
- Ape S**t C 90 2004

=== Studio albums ===
- It's Always 1999 (Ooo Mau Mau/Load) (2001/2004)
- Take Your Skin Off (Bulb) (2003)
- Die & Mold Services (Corleone) (2004)
- Expedition to the Hairier Peaks (Corleone) (2005)

=== 7-inch singles ===
- Split (with Prurient) (Important Records) (2007)
- Split (with Deep Jew) (Not Not Fun Records) (2008)

=== Appearances on compilations ===
- Old Tyme Lemonade compilation (Hospital Productions) (2004)
