= I've Visited the Island of Jocks and Jazz =

Studio album by The Hospitals
- Released: 2005
- Recorded: 2005
- Genre: Noise, punk rock
- Length: 24:39
- Label: Load
- Producer: Adam Stonehouse, Chris Woodhouse

The Hospitals chronology
The Hospitals (2003)	I've Visited the Island of Jocks and Jazz (2005)	Hairdryer Peace (2008)

Professional ratings
Review scores
Source	Rating
Allmusic	3.5/5 stars
Pitchfork	5.2/10

I've Visited the Island of Jocks and Jazz is the second album by The Hospitals, and was released in 2005.

== Track listing ==
All songs by Adam Stonehouse.

Side one

1. "Bands" 1:32
2. "Rich People" 2:30
3. "Olympic Ghost" 2:33
4. "She's Not There" 2:26
5. "Moving/Shaking" 2:14
6. "Jocks and Jazz" 1:29

Side two

1. "I Had a Crummy Shift" 0:30
2. "Problems" 1:31
3. "Airplanes There" 2:44
4. "Art Project" 1:11
5. "Be" 3:21
6. "Boom Bap Biff" 2:12
7. "Thank You (Floors)" 1:31

== Personnel ==
- Adam Stonehouse – vocals, drums
- John Dwyer – guitar
- Ned Meiners – guitar
