= The White Mice =

- Origin: Providence, Rhode Island, U.S.
- Genres: Noise; Noisegrind; Sludge metal
- Years active: 2001–present
- Labels: Load Records, Blossoming Noise
- Members: MOUSEaTONGUE; PHLEgMMY KILLMICESTER; ANONyMOUSE
- Past members: AutomRATon; CHeddie; CoCHeese; Euronymouse; Euronynonymouse; Ganjameice; Maus Kinski; MoustRATdumbass; Ol' DuRTY MOUSE TURD a.k.a. Big Baby Cheesus; Swiss Miss a.k.a. The Virgin Scary; The Chesident; Verminator X Vincent Mice

The White Mice are an experimental, industrial, noise rock, and noisegrind band from Providence, Rhode Island. They consist of vocals, drums, bass, and electronics, but in live performances often have a rotation of guest members playing guitars, electronica, and custom, unidentifiable circuit-bent instruments.

== History ==
Formed in late 2001, the band's first live performance on Halloween took titular and visual inspiration from an old, open sewers era, British slang, for used tampons and tissue floating in a sewer, slang still in use by plumbers today. They are known to use any level of humor, portmanteau terms and re-imagined puns throughout much of their work. (for example, they refer to their myspace as their "micespace"). The strong sense of irreverence, humor and creativity in all their work brought them a cult following as the band continues to play and tour often. On stage they adorn bloody lab outfits and custom circuit-bent mouse masks, and create a harsh, furious sound, a mix of bass and drum heavy rhythms, thick with distortion and wound full of howling live electronic manipulation and blistering vocals.

They have toured with Lightning Bolt, USA Is a Monster, Coughs, An Albatross, Skinny Puppy, Dj Scotch Egg, Bolz'n, Pleasurehorse, Suffering Bastard, and Athletic Automaton.

They have self-released several records, including "Mouse of Mendes" and a Christmas album entitled "Do They Know It's Christmice?" before being signed to Load Records, where they recorded and released two more albums. Further records have been released on the Blossoming Noise label of Atlanta Georgia, as well as several independent labels.

== Members ==
Current

- MOUSEaTONGUE - bass, vocals
- ANONyMOUSE - oscillator, theremins, kaoss, samples, tape machines
- PHLEgMMY KILLMICESTER - drums

Former

- AutomRATon - Guitard
- CHeddie - sawblades
- CoCHeese - drums
- Euronymouse - Rat Skins
- Euronynonymouse - Tapes
- Ganjameice - drums
- Maus Kinski - Saxophone, zither, chair, cheesus, guitard, contact mic, misc.
- Mouseferatu - bass, vocals
- MoustRATdumbass - Guitard
- Ol' DuRTY MOUSE TURD a.k.a. Big Baby Cheesus - Electronics, Hype, Chaos
- Swiss Miss a.k.a. The Virgin Scary - backup
- The Chesident - Traps
- Verminator X - Guitard
- Vincent Mice - Guitard

== Discography ==
Studio albums

Year	Album	Label	Format
2003	Mouse of Mendes	Self-Released, OHnonoNoise (2004)	CD-R, LP (extended, 2004)
2004	Do They Know It's Christmice?	Self-Released, Subharmonix/Brainpatch (2005)	CD-R, LP (extended, 2005)
2005	ASSPhIXXXEATATESHUN	Load Records	LP
2006	Tapeworm III	Self-Release	CD-R
2006	FissstSyphallus Diller	Self-Release	Tape
2007	HemosexualRodentalDamnatalcare((( of the future O)))	Self-Release	CD-R
2007	BLASSSTPHLEGMEICE	Load Records	LP
2007	ExcreaMantraIntraVeinAnus	Blossoming Noise	CD
2009	Ganjahovahdose	20 Buck Spin	CD, LP

Live albums

Year	Album	Label	Format
2002	Live at the Munch House	Fan-Release	3”
2005	LIVE at AS220, June 2004, Birthday Ceremoananal to the Jonestown Landfill	OHnonoNOISE	CD-R
2006	The White Mice Box, Live in Nashville, June 2005	StolenSounds.com	LP
2008	LIVE in Italy	Xhol Recordings	Tape

Compilation albums

Year	Album	Label	Format
2003	V/A Olde Time Lemonaid	Hospital Records	Tape/CD comp.
2006	V/A Pick A Winner	Load Records	DVD comp.
2009	V/A (TRISKAIDEKAPHOBIA) 13,000 milliseconds	Ratskin Records	CD comp.

Singles

Year	Title
2014	"Stinky n' The Strain"
2014	"A Better Mousetrap"
2014	"The Mice is White"
