= Silver Dagger =

Silver Dagger can refer to:

- Silver Dagger (song), American folk ballad
- Silver Dagger (award), Crime Writers' Association Award
- Silver Daggers, experimental music group
- Silver Dagger (comics), Marvel Comics character
- Silver Dagger, character from Samit Basu's GameWorld Trilogy
- Silver dagger, mercenaries in the fantasy novel trilogy Deverry Cycle
