= Jim Drain =

American artist (born 1975)

- Born: 1975 (age 50–51); Cleveland, Ohio, US
- Education: Rhode Island School of Design

Jim Drain (born 1975) is an American mixed media artist. Drain often makes work collaboratively, first within the collective, Forcefield (1996–2002) and also with artists Elyse Allen, Ara Peterson, and Ben Russell, respectively.

== Life and work ==
Drain was born on December 22, 1975 in Cleveland, Ohio. He graduated from Rhode Island School of Design (RISD) in 1998 with a B.F.A. degree in sculpture.

He is a former member of Forcefield, who were included in the 2002 Whitney Biennial. His solo exhibitions I Wish I Had a Beak (2005) and I Would Gnaw On My Hand (2007) were presented at Greene Naftali Gallery in New York. His work is held in the collection of the Museum of Modern Art.

He was the 2005 recipient of the Bâloise Prize.
