= Emergency room (disambiguation) =

An emergency room refers to a department in a medical facility that specializes in the acute care of patients without any prior appointments

Emergency room may also refer to:

- Emergency Room (series), a series of medical simulation video games
- A meeting room used by governments and civil servants for emergency management purposes in times of crisis
- E/R, a 1984-1985 American situation comedy television series
- ER, a 1994–2009 American medical drama television series
- The Emergency Room, an underground experimental music venue in Vancouver, Canada
- "Emergency Room", an episode in the French animated series, Oggy and the Cockroaches
