= Urge to Kill =

Studio album by Brainbombs
- Released: April 20, 1999
- Recorded: 1998
- Studio: Studio D-Takt (Uppsala, Sweden)
- Genre: Noise rock; garage punk; sludgecore
- Length: 36:38
- Label: Load
- Producer: Jan Jutila

Brainbombs chronology
Brainbombs (1999)	Urge to Kill (1999)	Cheap (2003)

Professional ratings
Review scores
Source	Rating
AllMusic	3/5 stars

Urge to Kill is a studio album by Brainbombs, issued on CD by Load Records in 1999. In 2010, Load Records issued the album for the first time on vinyl LP. The album's lyrical contents deal mainly with themes of sadism, murder and rape told from the perpetrator's perspective.

== Track listing ==
1. "Slayer" – 3:37
2. "Slutmaster" – 5:36
3. "Salome" – 3:00
4. "Ass Fucking Murder" – 3:28
5. "Maybe" – 3:52
6. "Down in the Gutter" – 3:50
7. "Stupid and Weak" – 4:41
8. "Driving Through Leeds" – 4:38
9. "Filthy Fuck" – 4:00
