= Expedition to the Hairier Peaks =

Studio album by Mindflayer
- Released: August 8, 2006
- Recorded: Providence, Rhode Island
- Genre: Noise rock
- Label: Corleone Records

Mindflayer chronology
Die & Mold Services (2004)	Expedition to the Hairier Peaks (2006)

Professional ratings
Review scores
Source	Rating
Pitchfork Media	(6.0/10)

Expedition to the Hairier Peaks is the fourth album by the noise rock band Mindflayer.

The album's title is a play on words to a Dungeons & Dragons module book Expedition to the Barrier Peaks.

== Track listing ==
1. "Rally for a Wind War: Whirlwind Dervish/Cracking the Barrier Riffs" – 10:56
2. "Getting our Hair Done" – 1:04
3. "Netherworld Bike Patrol C.H.A.O.S." – 6:58
4. "Time Tunnel/Cosmic Crypt Chronoscape Collision Course" – 6:31
5. "Each to their own Dark Path" – 12:33
6. "Mind Mirror Maze/Grow Horns" – 7:39
7. "Let's Play Holy War Fuckers" – 5:59
8. "Gore Gone Wild" – 5:02
9. "Nasty Meeting at Peak Park/Exploding Remains" – 14:07
10. "Caverns of the Hairiest Peak" – 8:05
