= The Emergency Room =

Music venue in Vancouver, British Columbia, Canada

The Emergency Room was an underground venue, recording studio and art space located in the Strathcona neighborhood of Vancouver, British Columbia, Canada. Founded in January 2007, The Emergency Room (Strathcona) emerged from Vancouver's DIY music scene and has been used as a practice space, art studio, gallery, and performance venue for touring and local acts. Performances and recordings at the Emergency Room have been by such acts as AIDS Wolf, Monotonix, Sex Vid, The Usaisamonster, Zs, T.I.T.S, Sissy Spacek, Bakelite, Hot Loins, Shearing Pinx, Mutators, Petroleum By-Product, Twin Crystals, Nü Sensae, White Lung, Defektors, Modern Creatures, White Owl, No Gold, Ice Cream, Cheerleader Camp and Vapid.

== History ==
The Emergency Room was founded and named because of a lack of venues with interest in noise and experimental music. It was host to public performances at the underground parking lot of the Emily Carr Institute of Art and Design on Granville Island. This location became known as the Emergency Room (Granville Island).

General interest in the concept grew, and the group of artists and musicians found a space for rent in Strathcona. They renovated the location, a former fish processing factory, into a warehouse venue. The location remained for a year and quickly established its name through its prolific recordings and high energy shows. This location was known as the Emergency Room (Strathcona) or, more commonly, The ER.

The warehouse caught the public eye in the summer of 2008 when local media began covering the phenomenon of its performances. The scene inspired the "weird punk" label associated with assorted local Vancouver bands. As popularity grew, the venue became packed at every performance. The police took notice when rowdy crowds began pouring out into the streets every week, and the venue was repeatedly fined for noise, alcohol and safety code violations. It also became a target for burglary due to its secluded location and recording equipment. They closed the warehouse space in late 2008.

== Recording studio ==
The Emergency Room also contained a recording studio run by in-house engineer, Jordan Koop. It has been used by countless bands for DIY/Independent release and for release on various record labels including, Kill Rock Stars, Summer Lovers Unlimited, Grotesque Modern, Nominal Records, Isolated Now Waves and Hockey Dad Records.

== Compilation LP ==
In 2008 two Vancouver independent record labels, Nominal Records and Grotesque Modern, released a full-length compilation album of artists who have performed or recorded at the Emergency Room entitled Emergency Room: Volume 1. The compilation was compared to Vancouver Complication in a review in Maximumrocknroll. The 924 limited edition vinyl pressings also included a foreword by co-founder Justin Gradin and a 20-page photo book.

=== Photo Book Foreword ===
"This record is to document a year of one of the best alternative spaces currently operating in Canada. THE EMERGENCY ROOM is located in Vancouver's rat and drug infested Downtown Eastside. A literal underground, this basement warehouse is an indestructible fortress of creation, destruction and repair witha [sic] a philosophy of DANCE or DIE, piss your pants and puke on yourself!!! From its origins as a free, D.I.Y. all-ages, noise/performance art gathering in the basement of Emily Carr Arts Institute parkade, to its current existence in a former fish processing factory, the E.R. has consistently put on some of the weirdest, most alcohol-soaked, most elaborate, entertaining and ridiculous art and music shows in Vancouver's recent underground history. After a year of spray-painted walls, bizarre installations and art works, blood, fights, broken glass, punk rock, noise, art, make-outs and more, here is EMERGENCY ROOM VOL.1." Justin Gradin

=== Vinyl track listing ===
·Side A

1. "Burning Light" performed by Defektors
2. "Kick First One" performed by Defektors
3. "Rat Face" performed by The Petroleum By-Products
4. "Grossest Thing" performed by The Petroleum By-Products
5. "Sex Stain" performed by Vapid
6. "Die" performed by Vapid
7. "Therapy" performed by White Lung

·Side B

1. "Instinct" performed by Mutators
2. "VVV" performed by Mutators
3. "Trinity" performed by Twin Crystals
4. "Safety" performed by Twin Crystals
5. "Graceland" performed by Nü Sensae
6. "Don't Panic" performed by Nü Sensae
7. "Peter Tripp" performed by Nü Sensae
8. "The Commuter" performed by Sick Buildings
