= Wonderful Rainbow =

Studio album by Lightning Bolt
- Released: March 4, 2003
- Recorded: Providence, Rhode Island; Costa Mesa, California
- Genre: Noise rock
- Length: 41:40
- Label: Load (LOAD #41)
- Producer: Dave Auchenbach

Lightning Bolt chronology
Ride the Skies (2001)	Wonderful Rainbow (2003)	Hypermagic Mountain (2005)

Wonderful Rainbow is the third studio album by noise rock band Lightning Bolt. It is considered to be their most accessible album, featuring heavy but catchy bass guitar riffs and frenetic drums.

This album is listed in the book 1001 Albums You Must Hear Before You Die, which describes the band as creating "a mix of sheer abuse and welcome diversity, for a truly challenging listening experience".

== Reception ==
Professional ratings
Aggregate scores
Source	Rating
Metacritic	81/100
Review scores
Source	Rating
AllMusic	5/5 stars
Blender	4/5 stars
Mojo	4/5 stars
Pitchfork	8.4/10
Stylus Magazine	A
Tiny Mix Tapes	4.5/5
Uncut	4/5 stars

Critical response to Wonderful Rainbow was generally favorable, with an average of 81 out of 100 based on 13 reviews on Metacritic. Online music magazine Pitchfork placed Wonderful Rainbow at number 157 on their list of top 200 albums of the 2000s.

== Track listing ==
All tracks are written by Lightning Bolt.

No.	Title	Length
1.	"Hello Morning"	0:55
2.	"Assassins"	3:43
3.	"Dracula Mountain"	5:11
4.	"2 Towers"	7:08
5.	"On Fire"	4:42
6.	"Crown of Storms"	5:09
7.	"Longstockings"	3:17
8.	"Wonderful Rainbow"	1:29
9.	"30,000 Monkies"	3:50
10.	"Duel in the Deep"	6:16
Total length:		41:40

== Personnel ==
Lightning Bolt

- Brian Chippendale – drums and vocals
- Brian Gibson – bass guitar

Technical personnel

- Dave Auchenbach – recording engineer
- Mike McHugh – recording engineer
- Jeff Lipton – mastering
- John Golden – vinyl mastering
