= Mudboy =

- Origin: Providence, Rhode Island
- Genres: Experimental

Mudboy (a.k.a. Raphael Lyon) is an American experimental musician and artist from Providence, Rhode Island.

== Career ==
Mudboy began recording experimental noise and electronic organ music in 2000 while a resident of Fort Thunder and continues to do so today. Over twenty albums have been released on a variety of labels since then. His compositions have been related to early minimalists such as Terry Riley, though he has identified dub music as an important influence in interviews.

As an installation artist, Mudboy builds mysterious landscapes that hearken back to the ambient noise-filled landscapes which fill his music. A residency at the art and book store in Los Angeles "Family" produced "a large-scale, touch-sensitive, dark-activated, 3-dimensional, 6-oscillator spellcasting diorama and crystal cave. This installation is a meditation on the potential of fractal topography, fungal biota, and the productive necessity of decay." Other installations in Baltimore, Chicago, and Providence also use darkness, micro LED lights, kaleidoscopic mirrors, fog machines and organic cardboard creations to create illusions. He is represented by The Mountain Fold Gallery in New York City.

The following is an excerpt from his artist statement: "My own intellectual affinity is with a time when the role of the artist, the priest and the doctor were not separated by contemporary conventions of specialization. Indeed, the operative metaphor for my work is derived from occult histories of magic and spellcasting, and from variations on the shamanic tradition. I lean heavily on the theoretical writings of authors like Ursula Le Guin and Philip K. Dick, both of whom argue that the production of "fantasy" and "miracle" is a critical, anti-fascist, and ultimately utopian occupation. It is wonder then, that I use my work to create"
