= The Hospitals (album) =

Studio album by The Hospitals
- Released: 2003
- Recorded: 2002–3
- Genre: Garage, noise music, punk
- Length: 25:21
- Label: In the Red Recordings
- Producer: Andy Christ, Matt McCugh

The Hospitals chronology
The Hospitals (2003)	I've Visited the Island of Jocks and Jazz (2005)

Professional ratings
Review scores
Source	Rating
Allmusic	3/5 stars

The Hospitals is the 2003 debut album by The Hospitals.

== Track listing ==
All songs by Adam Stonehouse, except where stated.

Side one

1. "Song 1" 1:26
2. "Hazmat" 1:11
3. "Freer" 2:17
4. "Rock And Roll Is Killing My Life" (written by Alan Vega) 2:43
5. "I Say Go" 2:18

Side two

1. "Friends" 2:05
2. "I'm Invisible" 1:47
3. "Again And Again" 2:43
4. "Don't Panic" 1:50
5. "We Buzz Just Like Bees Do" 1:24
6. "Missing My Hands" 4:43

== Personnel ==
- Adam Stonehouse – vocals, drums
- Rod Meyer – guitar
