= Ride the Skies =

Studio album by Lightning Bolt
- Released: February 11, 2001
- Recorded: Providence, Rhode Island
- Genre: Noise rock
- Length: 35:33
- Label: Load (LOAD #31)
- Producer: Dave Auchenbach

Lightning Bolt chronology
Lightning Bolt (1999)	Ride the Skies (2001)	Wonderful Rainbow (2003)

Professional ratings
Review scores
Source	Rating
AllMusic	3/5 stars
Pitchfork	8.1/10
The Village Voice	A−

Ride the Skies is the second studio album by noise rock band Lightning Bolt.

The second track, "Saint Jacques", is named after bassist Dan St. Jacques, a friend of the band and member of the bands Olneyville Sound System, Vincebus Eruptum (former), and Landed, the latter of which both Brian Gibson and Brian Chippendale are former members. Scandinavian free jazz power trio, The Thing, recorded a cover of "Ride the Sky". The cover is on their 2006 CD Action Jazz, released on the Norwegian label Smalltown Superjazzz.

== Track listing ==
All tracks are written by Lightning Bolt.

No.	Title	Length
1.	"Forcefield"	4:01
2.	"Saint Jacques"	4:13
3.	"13 Monsters"	2:48
4.	"Ride the Sky"	4:27
5.	"The Faire Folk"	6:16
6.	"Into the Mist 2"	3:21
7.	"Wee Ones Parade"	5:19
8.	"Rotator"	5:09
Total length:		35:33

== Album personnel ==
- Brian Chippendale – drums and vocals
- Brian Gibson – bass guitar
- Dave Auchenbach – recording engineer
- Jeff Lipton – mastering
