= Hypermagic Mountain =

Studio album by Lightning Bolt
- Released: October 18, 2005
- Recorded: May 29 – June 21, 2005
- Genre: Noise rock
- Length: 56:44
- Label: Load (LOAD #78)
- Producer: Dave Auchenbach

Lightning Bolt chronology
Wonderful Rainbow (2003)	Hypermagic Mountain (2005)	Earthly Delights (2009)

Hypermagic Mountain is the fourth studio album by American noise rock band Lightning Bolt, released October 18, 2005.

== Background ==
The band and their sound engineer, Dave Auchenbach, recorded the album in a house in Providence, Rhode Island directly onto a 2 track DAT master tape. The album is a clear continuation of the sound they established on their previous albums, featuring a very dense sound composed almost entirely of distorted, often-processed bass guitar; loud, fast drums; and indiscernible vocals buried in the album's mix. The album's artwork was drawn by Brian Chippendale; the album's title was not decided until after the artwork was finished.

== Critical reception ==
Professional ratings
Aggregate scores
Source	Rating
Metacritic	88/100
Review scores
Source	Rating
AllMusic	4.5/5 stars
Alternative Press	5/5
Blender	4/5 stars
Entertainment Weekly	B
Mojo	4/5 stars
NME	9/10
Pitchfork	7.3/10
PopMatters	8/10
Stylus Magazine	A−
Uncut	4/5 stars

Hypermagic Mountain was met with near-universal acclaim, with an average of 88 out of 100 based on 23 reviews on Metacritic. The same site rates the album at number 145 on the all-time highest rated albums, and as the fifth best album of 2005. Stylus Magazine's Roque Strew hailed the album as "another stride toward the perfection of [Lightning Bolt's] prog-noise esthetic", while Prefix Magazine's Aaron Richter called it Lightning Bolt's "most accomplished effort to date, one-upping 2003’s Wonderful Rainbow with a fresh sense of maturity." Pitchfork's Brandon Stosuy similarly described Hypermagic Mountain as the band's "most well-oiled album", but criticized that "somewhere in the middle a lack of variety creates a dull patch." Joe Martin, in CMJ New Music Monthly, said that the album's "craft-refinement has an exhilaration all of its own".

== Track listing ==
All tracks are written by Lightning Bolt.

No.	Title	Length
1.	"2 Morro Morro Land"	3:43
2.	"Captain Caveman"	3:19
3.	"Birdy"	3:06
4.	"Riffwraiths"	3:03
5.	"Megaghost"	6:01
6.	"Magic Mountain"	4:55
7.	"Dead Cowboy"	7:58
8.	"Bizarro Zarro Land"	4:47
9.	"Mohawk Windmill"	9:38
10.	"Bizarro Bike"	5:18
11.	"Infinity Farm"	2:46
12.	"No Rest for the Obsessed"	2:10
Total length:		56:44

== Personnel ==
- Brian Chippendale – drums and vocals
- Brian Gibson – bass guitar
- Dave Auchenbach – recording engineer
