= Wizardzz =

Electropop/noise pop band

- Origin: Middleborough, Massachusetts, U.S.
- Genres: Electropop, noise pop
- Years active: 2006–present
- Labels: Load Records
- Members: Brian Gibson; Rich Porter
- Website: Official site

Wizardzz is an electropop/noise pop band consisting of Brian Gibson (of Lightning Bolt) on drums and Rich Porter (of Bug Sized Mind) on synthesizer. Their debut album Hidden City of Taurmond was released on March 21, 2006, under the independent label Load Records. The band also created the soundtrack for the DVD Barkley's Barnyard Critters: A Mystery Tail.

== Discography ==
=== Albums ===
- Hidden City of Taurmond (2006)
