= Take Your Skin Off =

Studio album by Mindflayer
- Released: August 8, 2003
- Recorded: Providence, Rhode Island
- Genre: Noise rock
- Label: Bulb Records (2003)

Mindflayer chronology
It's Always 1999 (2001)	Take Your Skin Off (2003)	Die & Mold Services (2004)

Professional ratings
Review scores
Source	Rating
Stylus Magazine	B− link

Take Your Skin Off is the second album by the noise rock band Mindflayer.

== Track listing ==
1. "Take Your Shoes Off" – 2:20
2. "Head of State on a Plate Levitation" – 4:10
3. "Drop Bass Not Bombs Leviathin" – 2:47
4. "Awind War III" – 1:51
5. "Everyone Dies (We Won Anyways), Pt. 2" – 6:09
6. "Are You Fucked Up" – 1:42
7. "Gold Lake Spiller" – 3:36
8. "Bubble Trouble Lem in No Proble" – 0:58
9. "Cat Kid's Dance Troupe" – 3:24
10. "I Fell into a Pool of Crawling Chaos" – 2:25
11. "Street Attack with Mongrels, Elephants, Glitter, Etc" – 1:57
12. "Swallowed by the Earth" – 3:43
13. "Spit Out by the Earth Wind Skin" – 3:08
14. "You're Dead at the Bottom of a Dungeon, Deal With It (Medeley)" – 21:08
