= Business Lady =

American musical group

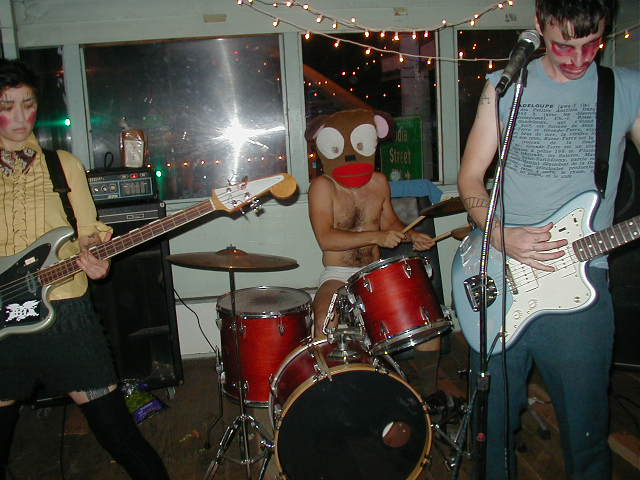
Business Lady show at Gelato Vera cafe in San Diego, July 2004

Business Lady was an American noise rock and self-described steampunk band based in California. They were known for their chaotic live shows and eccentric costumes. In August 2005, the band completed a full tour of the United States. Their album, Torture Footage was released on Load Records in the spring 2007.

== Lineup ==
Most recent members:

- Tara Barnes - bass, vocals. Formerly of Durga, currently tours with Carla Bozulich.
- Tobyn Maccormick - guitar, vocals. Formerly of The See-Thru
- Paul Morgan - drums. Formerly of The See-Thru, current member of Vholtz.

Past members:

- Michael (Mikey) McCardle - vocals, keyboard.
- Donovan Skirvin- guitar

== Releases ==
- Torture Footage CD on Load Records (2007)
- Split 12" with Rose for Bohdan on Half Adder Press (2005)
- Putting Out a Record Split 7" with Hustler White on Hello Asshole Records (2005)
- Skull Bashing 7" on Pacific Rock Records (2005)
- Self-released demo CD (2004)
