= Thumper (video game) =

2016 video game

- Developer: Drool
- Publisher: Drool
- Designers: Marc Flury; Brian Gibson
- Programmer: Marc Flury
- Artist: Brian Gibson
- Composer: Brian Gibson
- Platforms: Microsoft Windows; PlayStation 4 Oculus Go; Oculus Rift; Oculus Quest; Nintendo Switch; Xbox One iOS; Android; Stadia; PlayStation 5
- Release: Windows, PS4; October 10, 2016; Oculus Rift; December 20, 2016; Nintendo Switch; May 18, 2017; Xbox One; August 18, 2017; iOS; January 24, 2018; Oculus Go; September 6, 2018; Android; February 21, 2019; Oculus Quest; May 21, 2019; Stadia; November 19, 2019; PlayStation 5; February 22, 2023
- Genre: Rhythm
- Mode: Single-player

Thumper is a rhythm game developed and published by Drool and released in October 2016 on Microsoft Windows and PlayStation 4, with optional virtual reality (VR) support for the Oculus, HTC Vive, and PlayStation VR headsets. It was later released on the Nintendo Switch in May 2017, the Xbox One in August 2017, iOS in January 2018, Oculus Go in September 2018, Android in February 2019, Oculus Quest in May 2019, and Stadia in November 2019. The game was shown at the Experimental Game Workshop during the 2015 Game Developers Conference.

== Gameplay ==
An end-level boss in Thumper

The objective of Thumper is to guide a beetle-like creature along a single or multi-track through a series of unnerving worlds. The player must press a button to hit lit "notes" on the track in time with the background music, while also bracing against obstacles, turning against curved walls, jumping over spikes, and defeating enemies. The game is played in a third-person point of view with an extremely fast scrolling speed.

Each level is broken up into segments. After each segment, the player is given a score and a rating showing how well they performed. The beetle can sustain one hit (a missed turn or crashing into an obstacle), and at certain places it can regain its shield if it is lost. However, taking a second hit without its wing-shield in place will destroy it, and the level starts over at the last checkpoint. The player can repeat the segment as many times as is necessary to beat the level.

Each level in the game features rhythms corresponding to a time signature related to the level number, from 1/2 through to 9/8.

A secondary mode, 'Play+', is unlocked for each level after it has been completed. In this mode, the player must progress through the level on one 'life' (though still with the shield allowing one hit to be taken). Dying requires re-starting from the beginning of the level. In addition, the speed increases with the player's score multiplier.

== Development ==
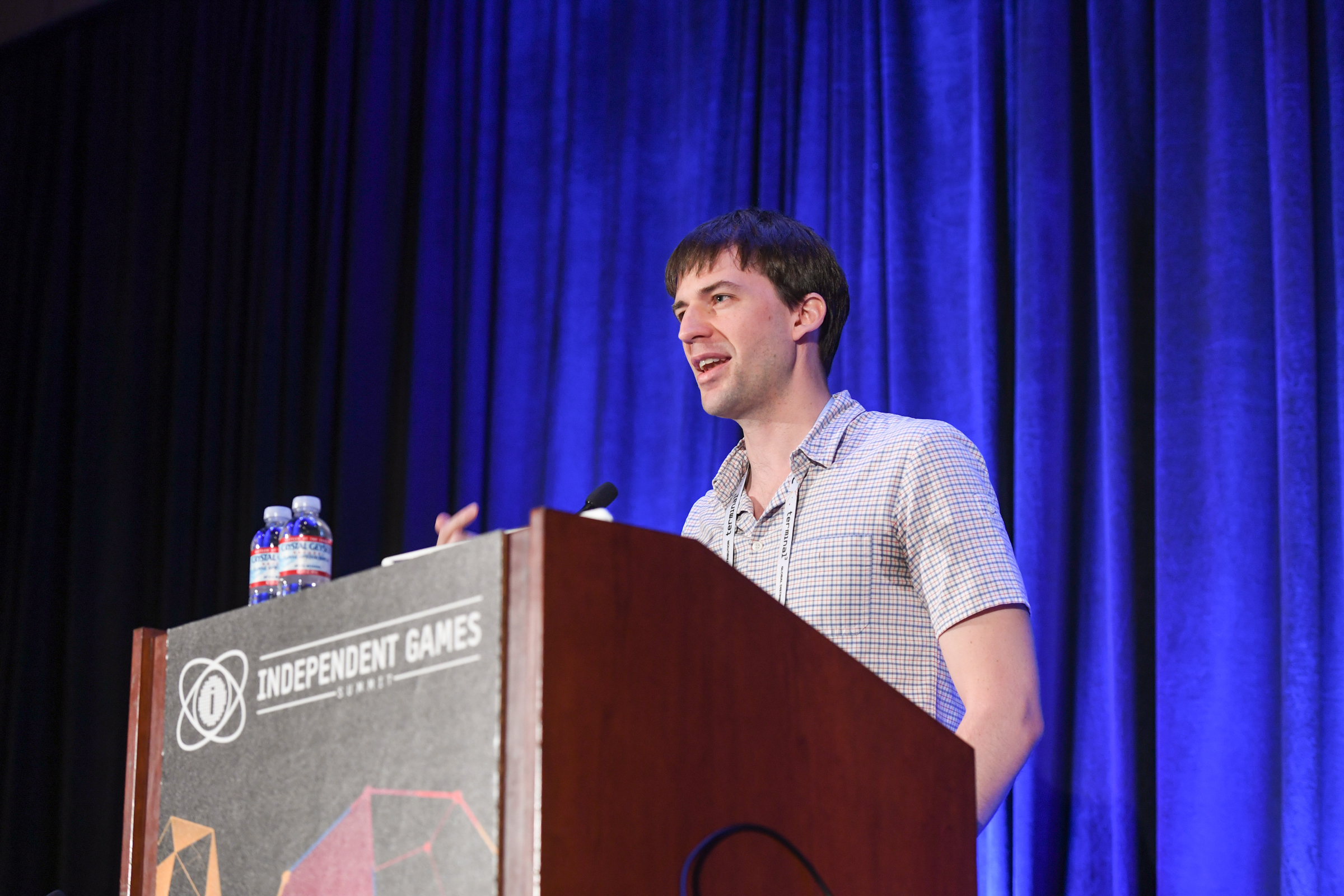
Marc Flury presents on the game's development at the 2017 Game Developers Conference.

Thumper was developed by the two-man team of Drool, consisting of Marc Flury, the programmer of the game, and Brian Gibson, the bassist for Lightning Bolt, who composed the music and created the artwork for the game. The design of the game was a collaboration between Flury and Gibson.

The game runs on a proprietary engine of Flury's design and has been ported to many different platforms and includes VR support. The game was praised for its rejection of the object-oriented programming paradigm in favor of a procedural programming approach. Much of the game's code was organized via a small handful of large files, some of which reached 6000 lines of C++ code.

The game was released for the Nintendo Switch on May 18, 2017.

A version for the Xbox One released on August 18, 2017.

The game was released on iOS devices as Thumper: Pocket Edition on January 24, 2018.

The game had a physical release for the PlayStation 4 and the Nintendo Switch on July 20, 2018.

The game was one of the launch titles for Stadia on November 19, 2019.

== Reception ==
Reception

Aggregate score
| Aggregator | Score |
|---|---|
| Metacritic | PC: 86/100; PS4: 84/100; NS: 85/100; XONE: 86/100 |

Review scores
| Publication | Score |
|---|---|
| Destructoid | 8/10 |
| Edge | 8/10 |
| Game Informer | 5.75/10 |
| GameSpot | 9/10 |
| IGN | 9/10 |
| Nintendo Life | 9/10 |
| Nintendo World Report | 8.5/10 |
| PlayStation Official Magazine – UK | 9/10 |
| PC Gamer (UK) | 82/100 |
| Road to VR | 8.5/10 |

Thumper received "generally favorable" reviews according to review aggregator Metacritic. PC Gamer declared it "one of the best rhythm games ever made." Chloi Rad of IGN wrote that "Thumper's trippy sights, sounds, and intense rhythm action create a terrifying VR experience I won't soon forget." The Official UK PlayStation Magazine listed it as the second best PS VR game.
