= Shearing Pinx =

Experimental music band

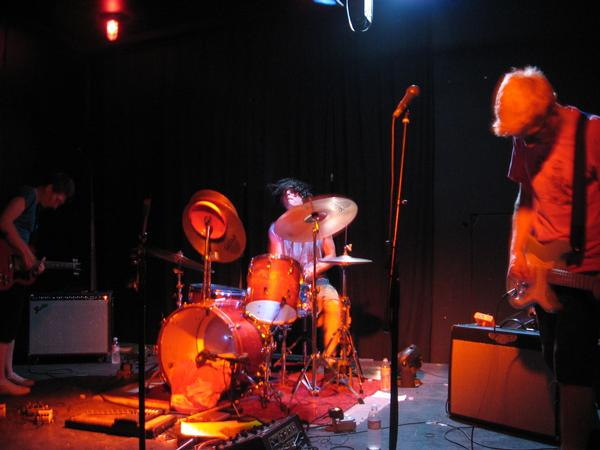
- Shearing Pinx, 2007

Background information
- Origin: Vancouver, British Columbia
- Genres: Punk rock, post-punk, no wave, experimental
- Years active: 2005-Present
- Labels: Isolated Now Waves, Not Not Fun, DNT Records, Gilgongo Records, Methodist Leisure Inc., Arbors Records, Ugly Pop, Divorce Records, Reluctant Recordings, Broadway to Boundary, Turgid Animal, Endless Latino
- Members: Nic Hughes; Jeremy Van Wyck; Isabel Ford
- Past members: Erin Ward; Jesse Taylor; Sydney Koke
- Website: https://shearingpinx.bandcamp.com

Shearing Pinx are a Canadian experimental, punk rock band from Vancouver, British Columbia. Formed in 2005, the band is made up of Nic Hughes (vocals/guitar), Isabel Ford (vocals/bass) and Jeremy Van Wyck (drums).

The band has over 50 releases including vinyl records, cassettes and CDs, most of which are distributed through Hughes' own record label, Isolated Now Waves.

The band is often associated with The Emergency Room venue in Vancouver and were featured in an article about Vancouver's "Weird Punk Scene" in the Canadian Music Newspaper Exclaim!.

== Discography ==
=== Albums ===
Date of release	Title	Record label
2006	Caves	DNT Records
2007	Poison Hands	Gilgongo Records
2007	Ultra Snake	Isolated Now Waves/Endless Latino
2007	Untitled Shearing Pinx/Silver Daggers Split	Arbor
2008	Breath of You Came Through Shearing Pinx / Mutators Split	Ugly Pop
2008	Haruspex	Divorce Records
2008	Iseult	Broadway to Boundary
2008	Untitled Shearing Pinx / Stamina Mantis Split	Reluctant Records
2009	Weaponry	Divorce
2010	Void White	Isolated Now Waves
2011	Night Danger	Divorce

=== Split Cassettes ===
Length	Artists	Record label
C20	Shearing Pinx / KK Rampage	Isolated Now Waves
C20	Shearing Pinx / Pretty Thigh	Isolated Now Waves
C20	Shearing Pinx / Ikebana	Isolated Now Waves
C20	Shearing Pinx / Modern Creatures	Isolated Now Waves
C22	Shearing Pinx / Animale	Isolated Now Waves
C20	Shearing Pinx / The White Tiger Prepade	Isolated Now Waves
C20	Shearing Pinx / Grey Daturas	Isolated Now Waves
C20	Shearing Pinx / Twin	Isolated Now Waves
C20	Shearing Pinx / Soft Shoulder	Isolated Now Waves
C20	Shearing Pinx / F.M.G.	Isolated Now Waves
C20	Shearing Pinx / Monosodic	Isolated Now Waves
C30	Shearing Pinx / Bestia Ferida	Isolated Now Waves
C20	Shearing Pinx / Shivers	Isolated Now Waves
C26	Shearing Pinx / Midwife	Isolated Now Waves
C20	Shearing Pinx / Shpilberg	Isolated Now Waves
C20	Shearing Pinx / Worms In Dirt	Isolated Now Waves
C20	Shearing Pinx / Starving Weirdos	Isolated Now Waves
C20	Shearing Pinx / Bot	Isolated Now Waves

=== Compilations ===
Title	Artists	Format	Record label
Short Attention Span	Shearing Pinx / Mongst / Mutators / Japanther / Fat Day / Village / Finally Punk / Total Abuse / Best Fwends / Barf Bag / many more	Freebie MP3	Methodist Leisure Inc.
Muisica Moche	Shearing Pinx / Soft Shoulder / Lord Galvar	VHS	DNT Records
Pregnant With Sound, Vol.1	Shearing Pinx / V/A	CD	Entertainment Records
Repetition Cntrl Waves	Shearing Pinx / Nons / Defektors / Automatic Fancy / Mutators / Hustler White / Ixquic / Podmind / Zeus / In Flux / Slums / The Ewoks	CD	Isolated Now Waves
Happy Birthday DNT	Shearing Pinx / Health / Pretty Thigh / Channels 3x4	CD	DNT
East Coast vs. West Coast	Shearing Pinx / Mutators / Modern Creatures / Nü Sensae / Be Bad / Hamborghinni / Attack Mode	Cassette	Divorce Records
I Ate Your Legs	Shearing Pinx / Nü Sensae / Twin Crystals / Talbot Tagora / Certain Breeds / The Doers / Channels 3x4 / Stamina Mantis / Nihilist Party / Blackmage / Christ In A Bucket and The Sons of Cock / Treasure Mammal / AD / Mattress / Hepitidal Wave / Derek Champion / Aeorosol Constellations / Dullmoofs / N.213 / Perilisk / Empty Love	CD	Thankless Records
