= Lightning Bolt (Lightning Bolt album) =

Studio album by Lightning Bolt
- Released: April 1, 1999
- Recorded: Providence, Rhode Island, 1997–1998
- Genre: Noise rock lo-fi
- Length: 31:44; 78:52 (with Zone)
- Label: Load (LOAD #26)
- Producer: Dave Auchenbach

Lightning Bolt chronology
Lightning Bolt (1999)	Ride the Skies (2001)

Professional ratings
Review scores
Source	Rating
Allmusic	link
Stylus Magazine	(C) link

Lightning Bolt is the debut album by noise rock band Lightning Bolt. Originally, five of the tracks on the album were recorded in the studio, however, with the exception of one track, the band discarded these and instead put low fidelity live versions of the songs on the record. A 50-minute "companion cassette" entitled Zone was available for three dollars via direct mail order when the record was originally released. This material appears in the form of two bonus tracks included on the CD release.

The original vinyl issue was limited to 750 copies and had the artwork that is represented on this page. The more common CD reissue contained slightly different artwork.

== Track listing ==
All tracks are written by Lightning Bolt.

No.	Title	Length
1.	"Into the Valley"	10:46
2.	"Murk Hike"	3:04
3.	"Caught Deep in the Zone"	3:13
4.	"Fleeing the Valley of Whirling Knives"	10:37
5.	"Mistake"	4:04
Total length:		31:44

Zone tracks
No.	Title	Length
6.	"Zone"	32:46
7.	"And Beyond"	14:22
Total length:		78:52

== Album personnel ==
- Brian Chippendale – drums and vocals
- Brian Gibson – bass guitar
- Rik Peltier – recording engineer
