= Hairdryer Peace =

Studio album by The Hospitals
- Released: 2008
- Recorded: 2006–2008
- Genres: Noise music, punk
- Length: 30:58
- Label: Self-released
- Producers: Adam Stonehouse, Chris Woodhouse

The Hospitals chronology
I've Visited the Island of Jocks and Jazz (2005)	Hairdryer Peace (2008)

Hairdryer Peace is the 2008 third and final album by The Hospitals, initially released on vinyl. It was named one of the 2008 records of the year by The Wire magazine. A CD release followed in 2009.

== Track listing ==
All songs by Adam Stonehouse.

Side one

1. "Hairdryer Peace" 3:30
2. "Getting Out of Bed" 1:50
3. "Rules for Being Alive" 3:08
4. "Ape Lost" 2:03
5. "This Walls" 2:37
6. "Sour Hawaii" 1:51
7. "Smeared Thinking" 1:51

Side two

1. "Tears" 2:17
2. "Animals Act Natural" 2:42
3. "Me, a Ceiling Fan" 0:57
4. "BPPV" 2:27
5. "Dream Damage" 1:47
6. "Scan the Floor for Food" 1:43
7. "Don't Die" 1:23

== Personnel ==
- Adam Stonehouse – vocals, drums, guitar, keyboards
- Chris Gunn – guitar, backing vocals
- Rod Meyer – guitar
- Rob Enbom – bass
