= It's Always 1999 =

Studio album by Mindflayer
- Released: 2001 (Ooo Mau Mau); March 16, 2004 (Load)
- Recorded: Providence, Rhode Island
- Genre: Noise rock
- Label: Ooo Mau Mau Records; Load Records

Mindflayer chronology
It's Always 1999 (2001)	Take Your Skin Off (2003)

Back cover

Professional ratings
Review scores
Source	Rating
Allmusic	3/5 stars
Pitchfork Media	(7.3/10)

It's Always 1999 is the first album by the noise rock band Mindflayer. It was released as a CD-R in 2001 before being released by Load Records in 2004. Front cover artwork and title by Miles Larson.

== Track listing ==
1. "Worm is Coming" – 2:22
2. "Repeating Tiger Fist and G Flury" – 2:35
3. "Destructed but Bits Rush (Let's Grow)" – 6:10
4. "Argamnimals" – 3:21
5. "5 Minutes of Sporadic Beats" – 4:15
6. "Legiomnomein and G Furry" (Legos) – 1:27
7. "Wind War Wind Blast Army" – 2:14
8. "Afterwarwards" – 0:51
9. "Revenge of Whales/Whale War" – 6:40
10. "Legiomnomein and Jumbinube Oboplex Company Marches" – 2:53
11. "Cyclone Ride to Animal Town" – 3:38
12. "Psychic Fields of Animal Town" – 6:10
13. "Mud Lazer Lazy Lazers" – 2:04
14. "Azaglians Troupe Hat Ribbons Fite Dance" – 2:01
15. "2nd Ribbons Wear On" – 3:42
16. "Zorthians Grazel Time" – 4:58
17. "Zorthians Finished" – 1:14
18. "1999 Animals Revenge" – 5:22
19. "Humbinobodos" – 2:30
20. "Carry on my Wayward Crawler" – 3:57
21. "Wolfs and Whales" – 4:32
