= Earthly Delights (album) =

Album by Lightning Bolt

Studio album by Lightning Bolt
- Released: October 13, 2009
- Recorded: 2007–2008
- Genre: Noise rock
- Length: 50:54
- Label: Load (LOAD #126)

Lightning Bolt chronology
Hypermagic Mountain (2005)	Earthly Delights (2009)	Oblivion Hunter (2012)

Professional ratings
Aggregate scores
Source	Rating
Metacritic	80/100
Review scores
Source	Rating
AllMusic	3.5/5 stars
The A.V. Club	A
Drowned in Sound	8/10
Pitchfork Media	7.6/10
Tiny Mix Tapes	4/5 stars

Earthly Delights is the fifth studio album by the noise rock band Lightning Bolt. It was released on October 13, 2009, by Load Records.

== Track listing ==
All tracks are written by Lightning Bolt.

No.	Title	Length
1.	"Sound Guardians"	4:52
2.	"Nation of Boar"	6:10
3.	"Colossus"	7:14
4.	"The Sublime Freak"	4:27
5.	"Flooded Chamber"	4:22
6.	"Funny Farm"	5:39
7.	"Rain on Lake I'm Swimming In"	2:14
8.	"S.O.S."	3:41
9.	"Transmissionary"	12:20
Total length:		50:54

== Personnel ==
- Brian Chippendale – drums and vocals
- Brian Gibson – bass guitar
