= Oblivion Hunter =

EP by Lightning Bolt
- Released: September 2012
- Recorded: 2008
- Genre: Noise rock
- Length: 38:10
- Label: Load (LOAD #142)

Lightning Bolt chronology
Earthly Delights (2009)	Oblivion Hunter (2012)	Fantasy Empire (2015)

Professional ratings
Aggregate scores
Source	Rating
Metacritic	66/100
Review scores
Source	Rating
AllMusic	3/5 stars
Beats Per Minute	73%
Pitchfork Media	7.2/10
Tiny Mix Tapes	3.5/5 marks

Oblivion Hunter is the first EP by the noise rock band Lightning Bolt. It was released in September 2012 by Load Records.

The record was advertised as an EP, although it has the length of some Lightning Bolt albums. The EP is a collection of unreleased material recorded in 2008.

== Track listing ==
All tracks are written by Lightning Bolt.

No.	Title	Length
1.	"King Kandy"	4:42
2.	"Baron Wasteland"	6:40
3.	"Oblivion Balloon"	3:18
4.	"Fly Fucker Fly"	3:46
5.	"The Soft Spoken Spectre"	1:12
6.	"Salamander"	5:07
7.	"World Wobbly Wide"	13:25
Total length:		38:10

== Personnel ==
- Brian Chippendale – drums and vocals
- Brian Gibson – bass guitar
