= DJ Scotch Egg =

Japanese electronic music producer

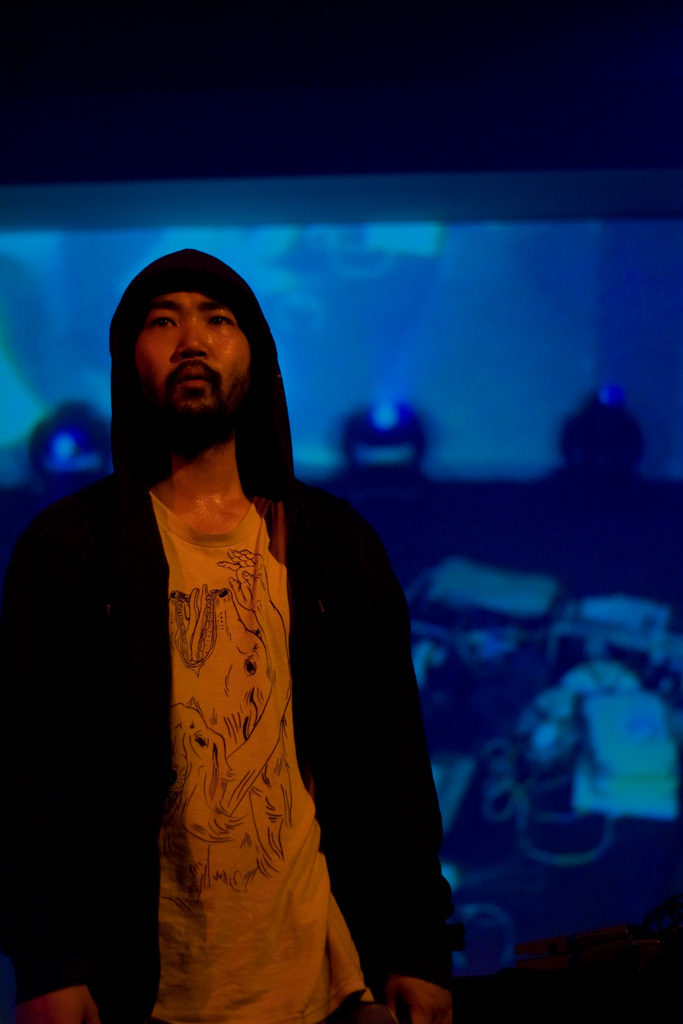
- DJ Scotch Egg on stage at the 2008 Sonar festival in Barcelona

Background information
- Also known as: Shiez 2000; Scotch Grind
- Born: Shigeru Ishihara
- Origin: Tokyo, Japan
- Genres: Chiptune; noise; speedcore
- Occupations: Musician; producer; DJ
- Instruments: Nanoloop, Loudspeaker
- Years active: 2003–present
- Labels: Wrong Music; Adaadat; Load
- Website: www.djscotchegg.org

Shigeru Ishihara, better known by the stage name DJ Scotch Egg, is a Japanese producer of chiptune/gabba music based in Berlin, Germany.

He has released music on the Wrong Music label and Adaadat, and was signed to Load Records after Lightning Bolt were impressed by his music. A new album entitled Scotch Hausen was released in Spring 2007.

Contributions with other artists include Ove-Naxx, Hrvatski (Keith Fullerton Whitman), Mike Paradinas, Duracell, Bong-Ra, The Pipettes and The Go! Team.

Shige has recorded improvised music collaboratively with Ashley Marlowe and Sam Dook under the moniker Same Things. Two tracks have so far been released through Junior Aspirin Records.

Ishihara is a founding member of WaqWaq Kingdom, along with vocalist Kiki Hitomi. They have released a number of albums on Phantom Limb.

== Discography ==
=== Demos ===
- Shiez 2000 demos
- Scotch Dub (2006, The Compliants Department)

=== Singles ===
- "Scotch Chicken" 7" single, Wrong Music, 2005
- "Scotch Vader" (featuring additional remixes by Ove-Naxx and Bong-Ra; Netherlands only) Kriss Records, 2006
- "Scotch Bach" (features additional remixes by Aaron Spectre and Shitmat, unreleased.)
- "Scotchy & Shitty" - Rave Like A Headless Chicken" (split with Shitmat) 12" single, Wrong Music, 2008

=== Albums ===
- KFC Core, Adaadat, 2005
- スコッチエッグのハードコア・チップチューン大百科 (Japanese only album, released on De-Fragment records title translates as "Scotch Egg's Encyclopedia Of Hardcore Chiptune") 2007
- Scotch Hausen (Adaadat/Very Friendly/Wrong Music) 2007
- Drumized (Load Records, 2008)

=== Compilation appearances ===
- "Yeah Man Thanks" (as Shiez 2000) on That's What I Call Wrong Music Volume 4 (Wrong Music, 2004)
- "Scotch Forest" on Whatever (Wrong Music, 2005)
- "Scotch Boy" on Remove Celebrity Centre (Junior Aspirin Records, 2006)
- "Switched on Scotch Bach 10" on Etc (Wrong Music, 2006)
- "Scotch Forrest' & 'Scotch Chicken" on OverKill (on Overkill, 2006)
- "Scotch Grind' on NUCD#02" (on Numusic records, 2007)

=== Collaborations ===
- "Untitled" (with Duracell) and a Live noise set at ICA with Hrvatski on Trade & Distribution Almanac Volume 3 (Adaadat, 2006)
- "Youth Pixxel" (with Germlin) on Youth Pixel album (Adaadat, 2006)
- "Punchingcones" (with Toxic Lipstick and Kunt) appears on The Rebirth Of The Fool Volume 3 (Dualplover, 2006)
- "Oodanhodoh Jya Massive Shoco-shocore (Ovnx And ScotchEgg Mashed U Shit)" (with Ove-Naxx) on Ove-Chan Dancehall
- "Scotch Pine" with Pine Forest on Infinite Chug
- "Brew" with Same Things on ASP 008 'Remove Celebrity Centre' CD compilation.
- "Toothache" with Same Things on ASP 014 'Skill 7 Stamina 12 - Toilet - Same Things' limited vinyl 12", 200 copies Junior Aspirin Records.

=== with WaqWaq Kingdom ===
- "Essaka Hoisa" (Phantom Limb, 2019)
- "Dokkoisho" (Phantom Limb, 2020)
- "Hot Pot Totto" (Phantom Limb 2023)
- "Mind Onsen" (Phantom Limb, 2024)
- "Doomed Ebisu: BBC Late Junction (live from Maida Vale" [in collaboration with NYX] (Phantom Limb, 2024)
