= Pink and Brown =

Former noise rock punk rock band

- Pink and Brown (photo by Larry Knudson)

Background information
- Origin: San Francisco, California, United States
- Genres: Alternative rock Punk rock Noise rock Art punk Post-punk; Avant-garde rock
- Years active: 1997–2003
- Label: Load Records,
- Members: John Dwyer (Pink); Jeff Rosenberg (Brown)

Pink and Brown was a noise rock/punk rock band from San Francisco, California, formed in 1997 when the members moved west from their old home of Providence, Rhode Island. The band consisted of Pink (John Dwyer) and Brown (Jeff Rosenberg). Pink played guitar and sang while Brown played drums. The band was influenced by the sounds and styles of bands such as Olneyville Sound System and Lightning Bolt.

The band's live shows (the first of which was at O'Brien's in Allston, Massachusetts) was a chaotic and frenetic performance from both members. The San Francisco Bay Guardian described their live sound as "Korean folk drumming gone punk". Both members would appear onstage in outlandish outfits that corresponded with their colorful pseudonyms.

The band broke up in 2003. On their message board they announced their disbanding simply: "Mommy and daddy still love you but they just can't stay married. We hope this doesn't put a damper on your childhood but we think you'll be just fine."

Dwyer went on to play with Coachwhips, Yikes! and The Hospitals. As of January 2022, he is playing with Osees. Rosenberg is a past member of Young People and The Jews, and is currently one quarter of Lavender Diamond. He also makes ambient guitar music under his own name.

== Discography ==
- Final Foods (ToYo) (2001)
- Pink and Brown/Death Drug 12" Split (Load) (2002)
- Shame Fantasy II (Load) (posthumous 2003)
