= Hidden City of Taurmond =

Studio album by Wizardzz
- Released: March 21, 2006
- Recorded: Providence, Rhode Island
- Length: 46:19
- Label: Load Records (2006)

Professional ratings
Review scores
Source	Rating
AllMusic	link
Pitchfork Media	6.9/10 link

Hidden City of Taurmond is the debut album by the electropop/noise pop band Wizardzz. It was released on March 21, 2006 under the independent label Load Records.

The song "Glimpse of the Hidden City" can be heard in the Paper Rad DVD Trash Talking.

== Track listing ==
1. "Disembark" – 0:46
2. "Sailship" – 2:52
3. "Whispers from Wallface" – 3:00
4. "Glimpse of the Hidden City" – 1:59
5. "Jelipper-Lilly Field" – 3:17
6. "'Do Come In!' (Tea and Chulliwugs)" – 1:27
7. "Sea Battle at Orkusk" – 4:16
8. "Diamond Mirror" – 1:20
9. "Chasing Our Shadows" – 2:57
10. "Ambushed by a Time Quagga" – 1:12
11. "Bubiliad Woods of Taurmond" – 6:13
12. "Ladydragons" – 7:29
13. "Rest at the Gate" – 1:58
14. "Mimi Vivian Sunrise" (Live) – 5:24
