= Metalux =

American noise band

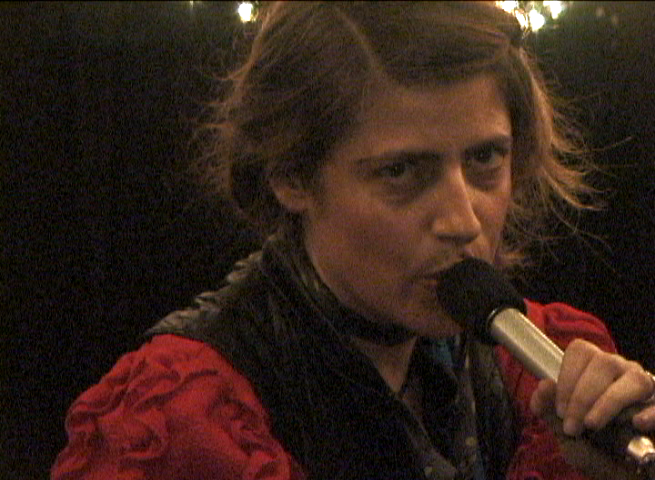
J. Graf in 2007

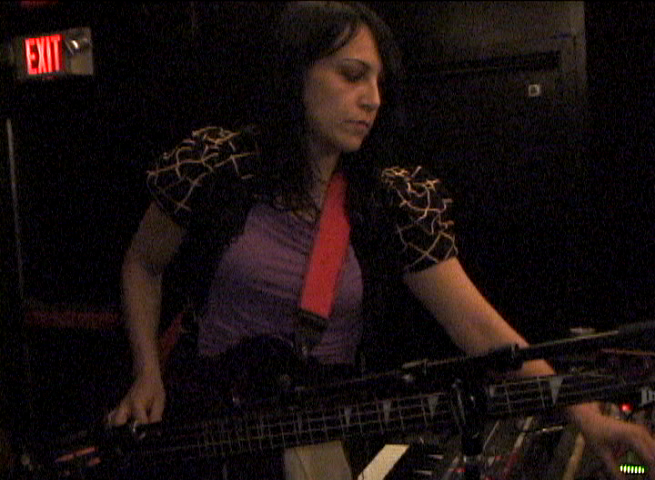
M.V. Carbon in 2007

Metalux is an American noise band consisting of M.V. Carbon and J. Graf, both members of Bride of No No. They are occasionally joined by Nautical Almanac member Twig Harper. Early material was released on the Hanson Records label, while their Waiting for Armadillo album was released on Load Records in 2004.

== Discography ==
This discography is incomplete

=== Solo ===
- Negative Capacity CD-R (Blackhole Records, 1998)
- Metalux III cdr (Hanson Records, 2000)
- Fluorescent Towers LP/CD (Hanson Records, 2001)
- Waiting for Armadillo LP/CD (Load Records, 2004)
- Victim of Space LP/CD (5RC, 2005)
- split lp with Evil Moisture (Veglia, 2005)
- 1-0-0-3/1-0-0-2 Cool Nite cassette/CD-R (Bennifer Editions/self-released, 2009)
- split lp with K.K. Rampage (Rampage Recordings, 2009)
- Paw The Elated Ruin CD-R/cassette (self-released/Obsolete Units, 2011/2013)

=== Collaborations ===
- Metalux & John Wiese Exoteric CD (Load Records, 2007)
- Smegma/Carlos Giffoni/Metalux untitled LP (Los Angeles Free Music Society/No Fun Productions, 2007)

=== Compilations ===
- Winter Construction CD with zine (Dead CEO, 2002)
- Pilot Conference CD with zine (Pilot TV, 2004) - Distributed with a zine for Pilot Television Convergence: Experimental Media for Feminist Trespass that happened in Chicago, October 8–11, 2004
- Sur La Mer Samp-La-Mer CD (5RC, 2006)
