= The Hospitals =

American noise rock band

The Hospitals were an American noise rock band from San Francisco, California, United States, active from 2002 to 2009. They were formed by Adam Stonehouse (Drums and vocals) and Rod Meyer (Guitar) in 2002 in Portland, Oregon, US. The Hospitals have released recordings through Load Records, In the Red, Yakisakana Records, Future Primitive, and Not Not Fun.

== Band members ==
- Adam Stonehouse – vocals, guitar, drums
- Chris Gunn – guitar
- Alex Cargyle – guitar
- Justin Flowers – drums
- Alain -fifa

Past members

- Tony Gladders
- Taylor Brack
- John Dwyer
- Ned Meiners
- Mike Donovan
- Eric Park
- Rod Meyer
- Rob Enbom

== Discography ==
=== Albums ===
- The Hospitals LP/CD, 2003, In the Red
- I've Visited the Island of Jocks and Jazz LP/CD, 2005, Load Records
- Hairdryer Peace LP, 2008, self-released; CD, 2009 Meds

=== Singles and EPs ===
- Again and Again 7-inch, 2003, Future Primitive Recordings
- The Hospitals/Big Techno Werewolves Split Tour cass, 2004, Folding Cassettes
- Rich People 12-inch 45 rpm, 2005, Yakisakana Records
- Hospitals/Afrirampo "Bored Fortress Singles Series split" 7-inch, 2006, Not Not Fun
- R. I. P. Cassette, 2010, Wastered

=== Live albums ===
- Employer Destroyer US Tour Cassette, 2006, Wave Waves
- Please Leave Europe Tour Cassette, 2007, Wave Waves

=== Compilations ===
- Static Disaster: The UK In The Red Records Sampler, 2003 In the Red (Song, "I'm a Bug")
