= Ara Peterson =

Ara Peterson (born 1973 in Boston, Massachusetts) is an American visual artist. He is known for his music-based films as well as interlaced relief paintings and sculptures, which are rooted in wave patterns and a process-intensive work ethic. Peterson was a founding member of the art collective Forcefield and is based in Providence, Rhode Island.

== Career ==
Ara Peterson received his BFA degree Film/Video/Animation in 1997 from Rhode Island School of Design (RISD).

Peterson has mounted solo exhibitions at Derek Eller Gallery, New York, Ratio 3, San Francisco, John Connelly Presents, and LOYAL, Malmo, Sweden.

His work is in the collections of Albright Knox, Buffalo, New York, Berkeley Museum of Art and Pacific Film Archive, University of California Berkeley, The Deste Foundation Centre for Contemporary Art, Athens, Greece, The Progressive Art Collection, Cleveland, Ohio, and the Museum of Modern Art, New York. His artwork has been exhibited in the Museum of Contemporary Art, Los Angeles, CA, Deitch Projects, New York, The Garage, Center for Contemporary Culture, Moscow, Russia, Bergen Kunsthalle, Bergen, Norway, P.S. 1 Contemporary Art Center/The Museum of Modern Art, Long Island City, NY.

He has made numerous films, as well as videos for musicians including Panda Bear, and the Black Dice.

As a founding member of the art group Forcefield. (1996–2003), he released multiple records and videos, and participated in the 2002 Biennial Exhibition, Whitney Museum of American Art, New York, NY as well as "What Nerve! Alternative Figures in American Art" (2014) at the RISD Museum, Providence, RI, and Matthew Marks Gallery, New York.
