= Neon Hunk =

American noise music duo

- Origin: Milwaukee, United States
- Genres: Noise; Electronic; Experimental
- Years active: 2000–2004
- Label: Load Records
- Past members: Mossmaster; Mothmaster

Neon Hunk was an American noise music duo from Milwaukee, Wisconsin, active from 2000 to 2004. The group consisted of a husband and wife who performed under the pseudonyms Mothmaster (vocals and synthesizers) and Mossmaster (drums, vocals, and additional synthesizer work). Initially formed in the summer of 2000 under the name Abracadaver, the duo adopted the name Neon Hunk in 2001. Following their disbandment in 2004, both members continued to produce and release music as solo artists.

== Music ==
Neon Hunk's music is characterized by sparse drum and synthesizer arrangements that are generally non-tonal and often employ non-standard, frequently changing time signatures. Their vocals are typically processed through a vocoder, contributing to their distinctive sound. The duo's style integrates elements of progressive and experimental rock, punk, avant-garde electronic noise music, and occasional free improvisation, all unified by a quirky, cartoonish pop sensibility.

Most of their songs are brief, rarely exceeding two minutes; however, their live performances sometimes feature longer, improvised jam sessions, as documented on releases such as Neyan Honkies and the tour-only SECRETS OF THE HUNK.

== Influences ==
Neon Hunk cited a diverse range of musical influences, including heavy metal and progressive rock acts such as Black Sabbath, Melvins, Rush, and Blue Cheer, as well as avant-garde and electronic artists like Ruins, early Devo, and Kraftwerk. In addition to these foundational inspirations, the duo was also influenced by their contemporaries in the underground noise and punk scenes, particularly other artists affiliated with Load Records.

The group's live performances were noted for their high energy, featuring erratic dance movements and the use of brightly colored, homemade masks and costumes. Their stage presence contributed to a surreal, theatrical atmosphere that complemented their experimental sound.

== Other activity ==
Neon Hunk toured extensively throughout the United States and Canada between 2001 and 2003, participating in both seasonal and regional circuits. They performed alongside experimental and noise acts such as Hair Police, Mammal, Wolf Eyes, The Locust, The Chinese Stars, Kites, and Black Coitus Family. The duo's final live appearance took place in 2004 at the De Stijl Festival in Minneapolis, Minnesota, where they shared the bill with artists including The Dream Aktion Unit, Devendra Banhart, Wooden Wand and the Vanishing Voice, and Dead Machines.

Following the dissolution of Neon Hunk in 2004, both members continued to create and release music independently. Mossmaster has self-released several solo CD-Rs and, as of 2009, was reportedly working on a full-length album and contributing music for film and video projects.

== Discography ==
- AbraCadaver 7-inch EP (Liquid Death/Hello Pussy Records 2001)
- Split 7-inch EP with My Name is Rar Rar (Liquid Death/Hello Pussy Records 2002)
- SECRETS OF THE HUNK (Self-Released tour only release - two versions with different packaging 2002 & 2003)
- Neyan Honkies Cassette (Heresee 2002)
- Smarmymob (Load Records 2003)
- Split 10-inch EP as Crystal Fantasy with Hair Police (Liquid Death/Hello Pussy Records ??)
