= Live Action at ROCK ALL, Oslo =

EP by Brainbombs
- Released: 1994
- Recorded: 20 May 1993
- Genre: Noise rock; garage punk
- Length: 9:41
- Label: Big Ball

Brainbombs chronology
Burning Hell (1992)	Live Action at ROCK ALL, Oslo (1994)	Genius and Brutality... Taste and Power (1994)

Live Action at ROCK ALL, Oslo is a live, seven-inch EP by Brainbombs. It was released in 1994 by Big Ball Records in Sweden, then compiled on the "Singles Compilation" in 1999. The performance includes Jonas Tiljander, the guitarist, on vocals rather than their usual vocalist, Peter Råberg.

== Background ==
The performance comes from the first of two performances at ROCK ALL in Oslo, which is a now defunct has pub/rock club. The performance also has Jonas Tiljander, the guitarist, on vocals rather than their usual vocalist, Peter Råberg. The band also had to get recording engineer, Birger Thorburn to play as a backup guitarist as Tiljander could not sing and play at the same time.

The band plays each song faster in tempo than their studio versions, except for Stacy, which is an unreleased song. According to Tiljander, there were around 54 people in attendance. Jonas has also said this is not the full concert, as "David" for Big Ball Records said some songs were "too muffled.

From the two concerts, songs "Urge to Kill", "Danny Was a Streetwhore", "Stacy" (different version) and "Tired and Bloody" were later released on the 2007 compilation, Brainbombs.

== Track listing ==
=== Side one ===
1. "No Guilt" - 1:44
2. "Wishing a Slow Death" - 03:12

=== Side two ===
1. "Stacy" - 02:28
2. "Burning Hell" - 02:17

== Personnel ==
- Jonas Tiljander - vocals
- Birger Thorburn - guitar
- Lanchy Orre - guitar
- Drajan Bryngelsson - drums
