= Silver Daggers =

- Origin: Los Angeles, California, United States
- Genres: Electropunk, noise rock, noise punk, noise pop
- Years active: 2003 - 2012
- Labels: Load Records; Arbor CDR; Not Not Fun; Zum; Kill Shaman Records
- Past members: WKSM- Vocals, synthesizers, trumpets, guitars, drums, drum machines Jackson Baugh- Vocals, guitars, bass, bass guitars, drums, synthesizers Jenna E. Thornhill- Vocals, saxophones Steve Kim- Vocals, bass, bass guitars, whistles, noise instruments Marcus Savino- Vocals, drums, drum machines

Silver Daggers are an American electropunk/noise rock band formed in 2003. Known for combining intense, atonal music with post-apocalyptic political ideas, they form part of the circle of musicians in close affiliation with The Smell.

== Discography ==
- "Shearing Pinx/Silver Daggers" - Split 7-inch - Arbor CDR (2007)
- "New High & Ord" - LP/CD - Load Records (2007)
- "Siked Psych: Not Not Fun Gold" - CD compilation - Not Not Fun (2006)
- "Arbor" - CDR compilation - Arbor CDR (2006)
- "Bored Fortress" - Split 7-inch w/ Death Sentence: Panda - Not Not Fun (2006)
- "Zum Audio Volume 3" - CD Compilation - Zum (2006)
- "Sea & Sea Music Factory" - CS compilation - Not Not Fun (2005)
- "Silver Daggers" - 7-inch EP - Not Not Fun (2005)
- "Art School, No Bleed" - Live CDR - Self Released (2005)
- "Pasado de Verga" - CS - Not Not Fun (2005)
- "Silver Daggers/Blue Silk Sutures" - Split 7-inch - Kill Shaman Records (2005)
- "A Tradition of Destroying the L.A. Times Building" - Live CDR - Self Released (2004)

== Line up ==
- WKSM - vocals, synthesizers, trumpets, guitars, drums
- Jackson Baugh - guitars, vocals, bass, drums, synthesizer
- Jenna E. Thornhill - saxophones, vocals
- Steve Kim - bass, noise, whistle
- Marcus Savino - vocals, drums
