= Brainbombs =

Swedish noise rock band formed 1985

- Origin: Hudiksvall, Sweden
- Genres: Noise rock; garage punk
- Years active: 1985–present
- Labels: Load; Releasing Eskimo; Wabana; Blackjack; Tumult; Big Ball; Big Brothel; Ken Rock; Anthem; Pollymaggoo; Richie; Lystring; Burning Hell
- Members: Peter Råberg; Jonas Tiljander; Drajan Bryngelsson; Dan Råberg; Lanchy Orre; Mattis Rundgren
- Past members: Andreas Lönnquist
- Website: http://geniusandbrutality.com/

Brainbombs is a Swedish garage punk band formed 1985 in Hudiksvall. The members are Dan, Peter, Jonas, Drajan, Mattis and Lanchy. The latter was also a member of Totalitär. Prior to Brainbombs, Peter was in a band called Dödshjälp (previously known as Hedebyborna).

They are notable for their very repetitive, noisy, untuned, raucous sound. Their lyrical themes and concept have been very controversial, as some of the songs depict acts of rape, torture, and murder, similar to the writings of author Peter Sotos, who has been named as an influence for the group. Other artists named as influences for the band include Chrome, James Chance, and Whitehouse, and the group's name comes from a Punishment of Luxury song.

== Members ==
Current

- Peter Råberg – vocals
- Jonas Tiljander – guitar
- Drajan Bryngelsson – drums
- Dan Råberg – trumpet
- Lanchy Orre – guitar
- Mattis Rundgren – bass

=== Former ===
- Andreas Lönnquist – bass (1985)

== Discography ==
=== Studio albums ===
- Burning Hell (1992)
- Genius and Brutality... Taste and Power (1994)
- Obey (1995)
- Urge to Kill (1999)
- Fucking Mess (2008)
- Disposal of a Dead Body (2013)
- Souvenirs (2016)
- Inferno (2017)
- Cold Case (2020)
- DIE (2025)

=== Extended plays and singles ===
- "Jack the Ripper Lover" (1989)
- "Anne Frank" (1990)
- "It's a Burning Hell" (1992)
- Live Action at ROCK ALL, Oslo (1994)
- Anal Babes/Brainbombs (1995)
- "Macht" (1999)
- Cheap (2003)
- "Stigma of the Ripper" (2003)
- "The Grinder" (2004)
- "I Need Speed" (2006)
- "Stinking Memory" (2007)
- "Substitute for the Flesh" (2009)
- "Blackout Ripper" (2023)

=== Compilation and live albums ===
- Brainbombs (1999) ("Singles Collection")
- Brainbombs (2007) ("Singles Collection II")
- Live at Smålands Nation, Lund, Sweden, May 29, 1993 (2008)
- Live at Kafé Hærverk (2023)

=== Other appearances ===
- In the Shadow of Death (1986)
- Unveiled (1986)
- King Kong 3 (1992)
- Assassins of Silence/Hundred-Watt Violence (1995)
