= Noxagt =

Norwegian band

Noxagt is a Norwegian noise rock band. It started as a Kjetil Brandsdal solo project in 1999, but was expanded to a power trio in 2002, with Brandsdal on bass, Nils Erga on viola and Jan Christian L. Kyvik on drums. Erga was replaced by Anders Hana on electric guitar in 2005.

Noxagt have a unique sound, which possibly stems from its members' involvement in diverse musical projects. Hana also plays with MoHa, Ultralyd and the Ingebrigt Flaten Quintet. Brandsdal also plays bass in Ultralyd and Hellfire. Kyvik plays guitar in Hellfire.

Noxagt is currently not signed to Load Records. A new record, entitled Brutage, was released 15 March 2014.

== Band members ==
- Kjetil Brandsdal - bass guitar
- Jan Christian Lauritzen - drums
- John Hegre - Guitar

=== Former members ===
- Anders Hana - baritone guitar
- Nils Erga - viola

== Discography ==
=== Albums ===
- Turning It Down Since 2001 (2003), self-released - CD-R promo
- Turning It Down Since 2001 (2003), Safe As Milk - CD (Scandinavian edition)
- Turning It Down Since 2001 (2003), Load - CD/LP
- The Iron Point (2004), Load - CD/LP
- Firebird / The Smell Of Incest (2006), Textile - LP split with Ultralyd
- Noxagt (2006), Young Aspiring Professionals - CD (Norwegian edition with bonus video)
- Noxagt (2006), Load - CD/LP
- Brutage (2014), Drid Machine - LP/digital

=== EPs ===
- KFJC (2002), Norway Rat - 7-inch EP
- Split (2002), Nor Wave - 7-inch EP split with Hellfire
- "Tears in the Makeup (Noxagt remix)" on The Chairs: Tears in the Makeup (2003), Kippers - 7-inch/CD-EP

=== Compilation appearances ===
- "Mek It Burn (Demo)" on Showcase NO CD-R (downloadable from issue 8 of web magazine Localmotives, 2002)
- "Powerchild" on The Wire Tapper 7 CD (The Wire, 2002)
- "Det Er Typisk Norsk Å Være Best" on Fjord Focus CD (The Wire, 2002)
- "Cockburn (Reh. 02)" on The Noise Is Only In Your Head CD (Gold Soundz, 2003)
- "Ondskapens Blomster" on Safe As Milk Festival sampler CD (Safe As Milk, 2003)
- "Regions Of May" on For the Dead in Space Vol. II & III 2CD (Secret Eye, 2003)
- "Drid Machine" on Hits Omnibus 2CD (Wantage USA, 2004)

=== Kjetil D Brandsdal solo as Noxagt ===
- Noxagt / Kjetil D Brandsdal: Split MC (Self-released, 1999(?))
- Noxagt 7-inch EP (Nor Wave, 2000) - 22 tracks
- Noxagt 7-inch EP (Nor Wave, 2000) - 13 tracks
- "What is up?" on Sandnes / Stavanger 7-inch EP (Nor Wave, 2000)
- "No I don’t", "Drid Machine (live)", "Not Interested", "Hairy Vortex", "Action Culture" on Sauron 7-inch EP (Synesthetic Recordings/Sandnes Records, 2001)
- Noxagt CD (Synesthetic Recordings, 2001) - 50 track compilation of all Noxagt tracks from the four 7-inch EPs listed above, plus previously unreleased tracks
- Pantyland CD-R card (Nor Wave, 2001)
- "Groggy" (Noxagt remix)" on The Slingshot Idol: Nå Skal Du Høre Her 7-inch EP (Norway Rat, 2002)
- "Groggy" (Noxagt remix)" on Lack Of Zodiac / The Slingshot Idol split promo CD-R card (Norway Rat, 2002)
- "Love Transfusion", "Abdel-Wahab", "Drid Machine" on Woman Taken In Adultery CD (Glasvocht Records/Carbon Records, 2002)
