= Mat Brinkman =

American artist and electronic musician

- Also known as: Meerk Puffy
- Born: 1973 (age 51–52); Austin, Texas, United States
- Genres: Noise
- Occupation(s): Artist, Musician, Comics
- Instrument: Electronics

Mat Brinkman (born 1973 in Austin, Texas) is an American artist and electronic musician. Also known as Matt Brinkman, Meerk Puffy, Mystery Brinkman, Brinkman, Brinkmangler, and Mucid Cuspidor. He is based in Colorado.

== History ==
Brinkman was a co-creator of the Fort Thunder artist live-work space in Providence, Rhode Island from 1995 to 2001. He resided in the Providence artist live workspace Hilarious Attic from 2002 to 2007.

He recorded with the bands Mindflayer and Forcefield, who performed at the 2002 Whitney Biennial. In 2000, his Teratoid Heights comic was published by Highwater Books.

Through his anonymous and pseudonymous works, he, like Bruce Conner and Marcel Duchamp before him, seems to be concerned with issues of artistic credit and its relation to artistic output. His musical performances have incorporated aspects of circuit bending and drum and bass.

Brinkman contributed principal concept art for the 2016 rhythm videogame Thumper.

== Discography ==
=== Albums ===
- "Transmittens" (Vermiform, CD) (1999)
- "Brinkmangler 2000" (CDr) (2000)
- "Scenes From A Posthuman World" (Cdr) (2000)
- "Steps In Defecation" (Bonescraper, Cass) (2000)
- "Nung" (Animal Disguise, LP.) (2003)
- "Untitled" (Cass) (2004)
- "Ashz/Arcs/Azes/Etc" (Animal Disguise, Cass.) (2005)
- "Farther Down The Road To Ecological Collapse & The Fucking Apocalypse Featuring DJ Mad Lion Disease Etc." (Cass) (2006)
- "Kreemy F.F.U.P." (Dolor Del Estamago, CDr) (2007)
- "Drobomatic Drobulations Vol. 1" (Audio Dregs Editions, CDr) (2007)
- "SYNB / HSDOM" (Phaserprone, CDr) (2007)
- "Channel 10" (CDr)
- "Orange Muss Tape" (Dolor Del Estamago, CDr)
- "Recordings From The Secret Room" (Dolor Del Estamago, CDr)
