= KFC Core =

Studio album by DJ Scotch Egg
- Released: 29 August 2005
- Recorded: 2003–2005
- Genre: Chiptune, gabba, Nintendocore
- Label: ADADDAT

DJ Scotch Egg chronology
Untitled Demo	KFC Core (2005)	Scotchhausen (2007)

Professional ratings
Review scores
Source	Rating
Stylus Magazine	(B)

KFC Core is the debut album from Tokyo-Brighton based artist DJ Scotch Egg. The album contains 12 tracks of chiptune and breakcore music which was allegedly recorded with a Game Boy, a loudspeaker, and effects pedals. The album also includes the song 'KFC Song', a song of Barbershop music which includes The Pipettes and The Go! Team (that also featured as the B-side to The Pipettes' 7" single of 'Judy'). The final song, Scotch Orchestra, is basically a conversation between Shigeru and the staff of the London Road KFC in Brighton, about eating the fast food.

== Track listing ==
No.	Title	Length
1.	"KFC Core"	0:04
2.	"Scotch Chicken"	2:40
3.	"Tetris Wonderland"	1:45
4.	"Scotch Heads"	2:10
5.	"Scotch Grime"	2:14
6.	"KFC Song"	1:40
7.	"Scotch Forest"	2:02
8.	"Scotch Attack"	2:03
9.	"Acidboy"	2:31
10.	"Scotch Land"	1:05
11.	"Scotch Out"	0:47
12.	"Knock Knock Sandwich Next Door"	12:59
Total length:		32:04

== Singles ==
=== "Scotch Chicken" vinyl ===
The vinyl is of poor quality due to having been recorded at the wrong speed. It came packaged in a large picture of a scotch egg.

1. Scotch Chicken
2. Scotch Party

== Notes ==
- Some tunes on KFC Core are remakes of traditional songs, for instance Tetris Wonderland is a remake of the Russian song Korobeiniki; Scotch Forest is a remake of the theme of In the Hall of the Mountain King and Scotch Land is a remake of Scotland the Brave.
- The songs Tetris Wonderland and Acid Boy (sans vocals) are taken from DJ Scotch Egg's Untitled Demo.
