= Brian Chippendale =

Musician and graphic artist

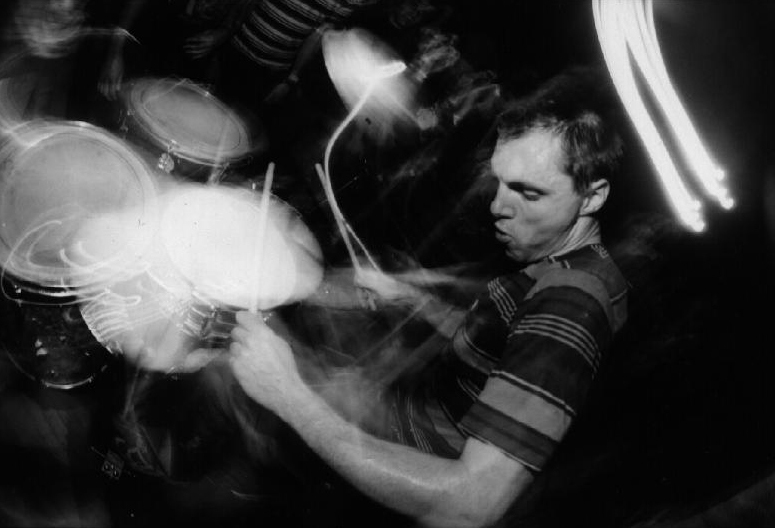

Background information
- Born: July 22, 1973 (age 53); Newburgh, New York, U.S.
- Origin: Providence, Rhode Island, U.S.
- Genres: Experimental; noise rock
- Occupations: Singer, drummer, comic book artist, poster art
- Instruments: Drums, vocals
- Years active: 1994–present
- Labels: Thrill Jockey, Load Records, Corleone, Bulb, Ooo Mau Mau

Brian Chippendale (born July 22, 1973) is an American musician and artist, known as the drummer and vocalist for the experimental noise rock band Lightning Bolt and for his graphic art. Chippendale is based in Providence, Rhode Island.

Brian plays an assortment of drums usually decorated with prints he makes himself. He uses two ride cymbals as crash rides and a Ludwig snare drum.

== Early life and education ==
Chippendale was born July 22, 1973, in Newburgh, New York, and was raised in suburban Philadelphia, Pennsylvania. Chippendale is also an artist and attended printmaking classes at Rhode Island School of Design (RISD) in the late 1990s through 2000, but did not graduate.

== Music ==
As a vocalist for Lightning Bolt and Mindflayer, Chippendale eschews the usual microphone stand and conventional microphone, instead using a contact microphone. Chippendale often warbles or makes nonsensical sounds into the microphone, so the vocals typically come out extremely distorted and incomprehensible. More recently, Chippendale has used a Line 6 delay pedal to delay and repeat his vocals while drumming.

Chippendale participated as drummer 77 in the Boredoms' 77 Boadrum performance which occurred on July 7, 2007, at the Empire-Fulton Ferry State Park in Brooklyn.

Chippendale performed drums on Björk's 2007 album Volta and her 2008 charity single "Náttúra". He also did a remix for Björk's single "Declare Independence" under the alias Black Pus.

Chippendale is part of the duo Wasted Shirt with Ty Segall, releasing their debut album, Fungus II, in 2020.

== Graphic art ==
Chippendale created the album art for all Lightning Bolt releases. In October 2006, Chippendale released the comic book Ninja, an art book and comic that incorporates simple action comics he drew as a child with more surreal work drawn as an adult. In 2007 he released Maggots, which was drawn ten years previously but had never been released. Maggots is drawn over a Japanese book catalog, so Japanese characters appear in all the spaces that are not inked in by his pen. His next graphic novel, "If n' Oof", was published on June 30, 2010.

In June 2010 an exhibit Fruiting Bodies of Chippendale's artwork opened at the Cinders Gallery in Brooklyn. Since May 2011, Chippendale has published a monthly comic in Mothers News, a monthly newspaper published in Providence, Rhode Island.

In February 2016, Chippendale published another graphic novel with Drawn and Quarterly entitled Puke Force. In 2016, an article entitled "100 Greatest Drummers of All Time" in Rolling Stone magazine ranked Brian Chippendale as number 91.

Chippendale currently shares a large industrial studio space in Providence with his wife, Jungil Hong, which they call the "Hilarious Attic". Chippendale and Hong have a son.

== Discography ==
=== Lightning Bolt ===
- Lightning Bolt (1999)
- Ride the Skies (2001)
- Wonderful Rainbow (2003)
- Hypermagic Mountain (2005)
- Earthly Delights (2009)
- Oblivion Hunter (2012)
- Fantasy Empire (2015)
- Sonic Citadel (2019)

=== Black Pus ===
- Black Pus 1 (2005)
- Black Pus 2 (2006)
- Black Pus 3: Metamorpus (2006)
- Black Pus 4: All Aboard the Magic Pus (2008)
- Black Pus Zero: Ultimate Beat Off (2009)
- Primordial Pus (2011)
- Pus Mortem (2012)
- All My Relations (2013)
- Black Pus split LP with Oozing Wound (2014)
- Def Vesper (2020)
- Terrestrial Seethings (2024)

=== Boredoms ===
- 77Boadrum (2007)

=== Wasted Shirt ===
- Fungus II (2020)
