= Fantasy Empire =

Studio album by Lightning Bolt
- Released: March 24, 2015
- Genre: Noise rock
- Length: 48:07
- Label: Thrill Jockey

Lightning Bolt chronology
Oblivion Hunter (2012)	Fantasy Empire (2015)	Sonic Citadel (2019)

Professional ratings
Aggregate scores
Source	Rating
Metacritic	84/100
Review scores
Source	Rating
AllMusic	4.5/5 stars
Consequence of Sound	B+
Exclaim!	(9/10)
Pitchfork	8.0

Fantasy Empire is the sixth studio album by American noise rock band Lightning Bolt. It was released in March 2015 under Thrill Jockey Records.

== Track listing ==
All tracks are written by Lightning Bolt.

No.	Title	Length
1.	"The Metal East"	4:12
2.	"Over the River and Through the Woods"	6:31
3.	"Horsepower"	4:43
4.	"King of My World"	3:56
5.	"Mythmaster"	5:11
6.	"Runaway Train"	4:38
7.	"Leave the Lantern Lit"	1:15
8.	"Dream Genie"	6:21
9.	"Snow White (& The 7 Dwarves Fans)"	11:20
Total length:		48:07
