= Sonic Citadel =

Studio album by Lightning Bolt
- Released: October 11, 2019
- Genre: Noise rock
- Length: 52:46
- Label: Thrill Jockey

Lightning Bolt chronology
Fantasy Empire (2015)	Sonic Citadel (2019)	The Horizon Spirals / The Horizon Viral (2026)

Professional ratings
Aggregate scores
Source	Rating
Metacritic	77/100
Review scores
Source	Rating
AllMusic	4/5 stars
Pitchfork	7.8/10
The Quietus	Positive
DC Music Review	Positive

Sonic Citadel is the seventh studio album by American noise rock band Lightning Bolt. It was released in October 2019 under Thrill Jockey Records.

== Track listing ==
All tracks are written by Lightning Bolt.

No.	Title	Length
1.	"Blow to the Head"	3:09
2.	"USA Is a Psycho"	3:08
3.	"Air Conditioning"	4:13
4.	"Hüsker Dön't"	6:04
5.	"Big Banger"	5:05
6.	"Halloween 3"	5:49
7.	"Don Henley in the Park"	3:50
8.	"Tom Thump"	2:42
9.	"Bouncy House"	4:39
10.	"All Insane"	4:57
11.	"Van Halen 2049"	9:10
Total length:		52:46
