= Forcefield (art collective) =

Forcefield was an American noise band and art collective, founded in 1997 in Providence, Rhode Island, closely associated with Fort Thunder.

== Work ==
Known for performing in colorful full-body knit-wear of their own design, the band rarely played outside of Rhode Island but did two US tours with their Fort Thunder roommates Lightning Bolt. Members included Meerk Puffy (Mat Brinkman), Gorgon Radeo (Jim Drain), P Lobe (Ara Peterson), and Le Geef (Leif Goldberg). The group become more widely recognized after being included in the 2002 Whitney Biennial, but disbanded shortly afterwards. According to writer Rachel Kushner, the group's Whitney Biennial installation was "a pandemonium of ear-cracking sound, seizure-inducing films, and bewigged mannequins sheathed in the collective's trademark knit Afghans, which look like they were produced by a team of Taylorist acidheads with industrial looms." Third Annual Roggabogga, the soundtrack accompanying their Biennial show, was released as a CD by Load Records in 2003. Later that year, Bulb Records put out the posthumous Lord of the Rings Modulator.

In addition to performing, the group produced a number of single channel video works to be projected behind them during performances. The videos are both serious and sublime, while simultaneously maintaining a sensibility of deadpan humor and menace.
