= The USA Is a Monster =

American experimental rock band

The USA Is a Monster (or USAISAMONSTER) is an experimental rock band. They're associated with Boston and Brooklyn, New York City.

== History ==
For most of their existence, the USA Is a Monster was a duo composed of Colin Langenus and Thom Hohman, both of whom play multiple instruments. While living in Boston, Thom and Colin had been members of the noise rock band Bull Roarer and the theatrical rock group Elvish Presley, which later became Black Elf Speaks. The initial incarnations of the USA Is a Monster emerged from these projects, and included other musicians as documented on the band's first EP and LP released on the tiny Infrasound label.

The group signed to Load Records in 2003 and issued four full-lengths on the label – Tasheyana Compost in 2003, Wohaw in 2005, Sunset at the End of the Industrial Age in 2006, and Space Programs in 2008. Their last album of new material, R.I.P., was released on Northern Spy Records in 2010, after the band officially announced their break-up in 2009. The band released a compilation of old material entitled Lost and Found on cassette via Northern Spy in 2012.

Back together again, they released Amikwag on October 30, 2020, via Yeggs Records, along with a video for "Permaculture's Promise", the first song on the album.

== Discography ==
- Citizens of the Universe LP (Infrasound, 2002)
- Masonic Chronic EP (Infrasound, 2002)
- Citizens of the Chronic CD (compiles first LP and EP) (Infrasound, 2003)
- Tasheyana Compost (Load Records, 2003)
- Wohaw (Load Records, 2005)
- Geronimo EP, picture disc (Lovepump Records, 2006)
- Sunset at the End of the Industrial Age (Load Records, 2006)
- Space Programs (Load Records, 2008)
- R.I.P. (Northern Spy Records, 2010)
- Lost and Found (Northern Spy Records, 2012)
- Amikwag (Yeggs, 2020)
