= Fort Thunder =

Art & music venue/studio in Providence, Rhode Island

Coordinates: 41.82601°N 71.43777°W

Fort Thunder sign comparison

Fort Thunder (1995–2001) was a warehouse on the second floor of a pre-Civil War former textile factory in the Olneyville district of Providence, Rhode Island. From 1995 through 2001, the space was used as a venue for underground music and events, as well as a living and working space for the artists. Fort Thunder was started by Mat Brinkman and Brian Chippendale, who were the space's original residents along with Rob Coggeshal and Freddy Jones. Fort Thunder was known for its colorful posters promoting shows posted on walls around Providence. At various times they hosted costumed wrestling and Halloween mazes. The group of artists who lived and worked there is also sometimes referred to as "Fort Thunder."

In 2000 it was announced that the mill building where Fort Thunder was located would be demolished. This led to protests and court challenges by both artists and historical preservationists. In 2002 the collective was forced to leave. The building was then demolished by Feldco developers to make way for the parking lot of a Shaw's grocery store and a Staples, both of which closed soon after opening. This has caused a debate about development and gentrification in Olneyville, the poorest neighborhood in Providence.

Since the closure of Fort Thunder, former residents and friends of Fort Thunder have received acclaim in many areas, particularly in the genres of noise rock, alternative comics, and contemporary art. Members of Forcefield, a collaborative project started at Fort Thunder, had their artwork included in the 2002 Whitney Biennial. In 2006, the Museum of Art at Rhode Island School of Design exhibited Wunderground: Providence, 1995 to the Present, an exhibition focusing on the underground art and music scene of Providence, with major reference to and inclusion of artists connected to Fort Thunder. The Rhode Island Council for the Humanities held an exhibition in 2019 featuring Fort Thunder concert posters, recordings of bands, and ephemera.

Footage at Fort Thunder, including concerts, art events, as well as its eventual demolition, are prominently featured in the 2024 documentary Secret Mall Apartment.
