= Lightning Bolt (band) =

American noise rock band

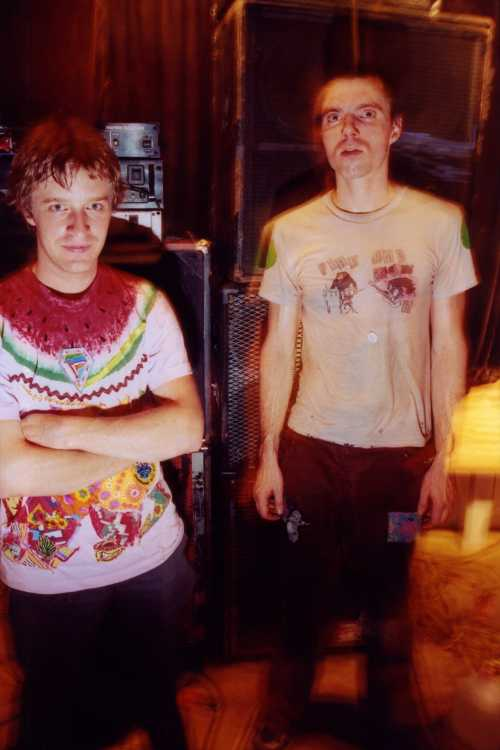
- Lightning Bolt in 2003. From left: Brian Gibson and Brian Chippendale

Background information
- Origin: Providence, Rhode Island, U.S.
- Genre: Noise rock
- Years active: 1994–present
- Labels: Load; Thrill Jockey
- Members: Brian Chippendale; Brian Gibson
- Past members: Hisham Bharoocha
- Website: laserbeast.com

Lightning Bolt is an American noise rock duo from Providence, Rhode Island, composed of Brian Chippendale on drums and vocals and Brian Gibson on bass guitar. The band met and formed in 1994 as students of the Rhode Island School of Design. Lightning Bolt were listed 8th in Metacritic's Artists of the Decade 2000–09.

Lightning Bolt are known for their guerrilla-style live performances, where they typically play on the ground rather than a stage, with the crowd gathered around them. The band's sound is typically loud and aggressive, though the group cites composers Philip Glass and Sun Ra as compositional influences.

== History ==
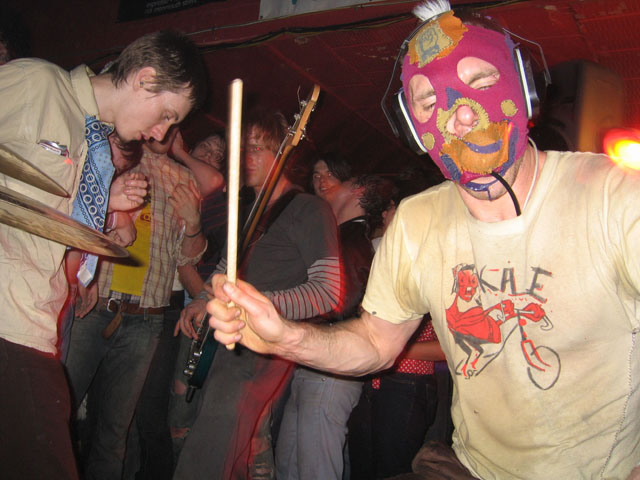
Lightning Bolt Live (2005) at the Southgate House

The band formed while Chippendale and Gibson attended the Rhode Island School of Design in Providence, Rhode Island, and Chippendale had heard about "a new kid who was a whiz on the bass guitar." The two formed Lightning Bolt, with Brian Chippendale on drums, Brian Gibson on bass guitar, and with Hisham Bharoocha on extra percussion and vocals joining the group after their first show. Bharoocha left the group in 1996 to continue with another RISD band that would eventually become Black Dice, and Chippendale took over vocal duties. The only officially released music with Bharoocha was a track on the Repopulation Program compilation. For the first few years, Lightning Bolt was primarily an improvisational band, touring the United States for months at a time and "just playing". The concept of writing songs and recording an album didn't occur to the band until 1997, when Ben McOsker, founder of Load Records, approached the duo.

During these formative years, Chippendale and his freshman-year college roommate Matt Brinkman began to set up Fort Thunder, a disused warehouse space in the Olneyville district of Providence. The space eventually came to house a number of local avant-garde artists and musicians, including Brian Ralph as well as Lightning Bolt.

The band's first full-length album was a self-titled vinyl record on the Load Records label. The album was initially released in a limited edition pressing of 750 copies, and a 50-minute companion cassette titled "Zone" was released later. In 1999 the album was re-released on CD, including "Zone" as bonus tracks and alternative cover art.

Lightning Bolt's second full-length album was Ride the Skies, released in 2001, followed by Wonderful Rainbow in 2003.

The band starred in the 2003 tour-DVD The Power of Salad directed by Peter Glantz and Nick Noe. Lightning Bolt have also performed in DVD compilations such as Pick a Winner (2004) and Sleep When You are Dead by performance artists Mighty Robot (2007).

Rumors have persisted concerning the release of an improvisational album entitled Frenzy. A post on Lightning Bolt's official website in early 2004 read "The next Lightning Bolt album, Frenzy, is currently in the works over at Load Records. It is expected to be available at the end of the summer." No official word has since been released.

In 2005, Lightning Bolt released Hypermagic Mountain, their most critically acclaimed album to date.

In 2006, Lightning Bolt was deported from Japan days after they arrived to continue their tour from the UK. Band members were detained on arrival on the grounds that they did not have work permits. Their official appeal was rejected after 48 hours, and they were deported back to the United States.

In 2009, their album Earthly Delights was released on Load Records.

In 2012, their first EP Oblivion Hunter was released on Load Records. The EP is a collection of unreleased material recorded in 2008.

On March 9, 2015, the group's full length Fantasy Empire became available to stream via NPR's First Listen. The accompanying writeup praised the increased clarity and fidelity of the recording, as compared to their earlier work, citing as a parallel example "... the scene in The Wizard Of Oz where a sepia tone gives way to Technicolor; it opens up new vistas to the sound, while giving the band an opportunity to exhibit more involved musicianship." It was released on the Thrill Jockey label on March 25, 2015.

On October 11, 2019, the group released their seventh studio album Sonic Citadel on Thrill Jockey.

In January 2026, the group announced a split album with Japanese band OOIOO titled The Horizon Spirals / The Horizon Viral. It released on April 24, 2026 on Thrill Jockey.

== Musical and lyrical style ==
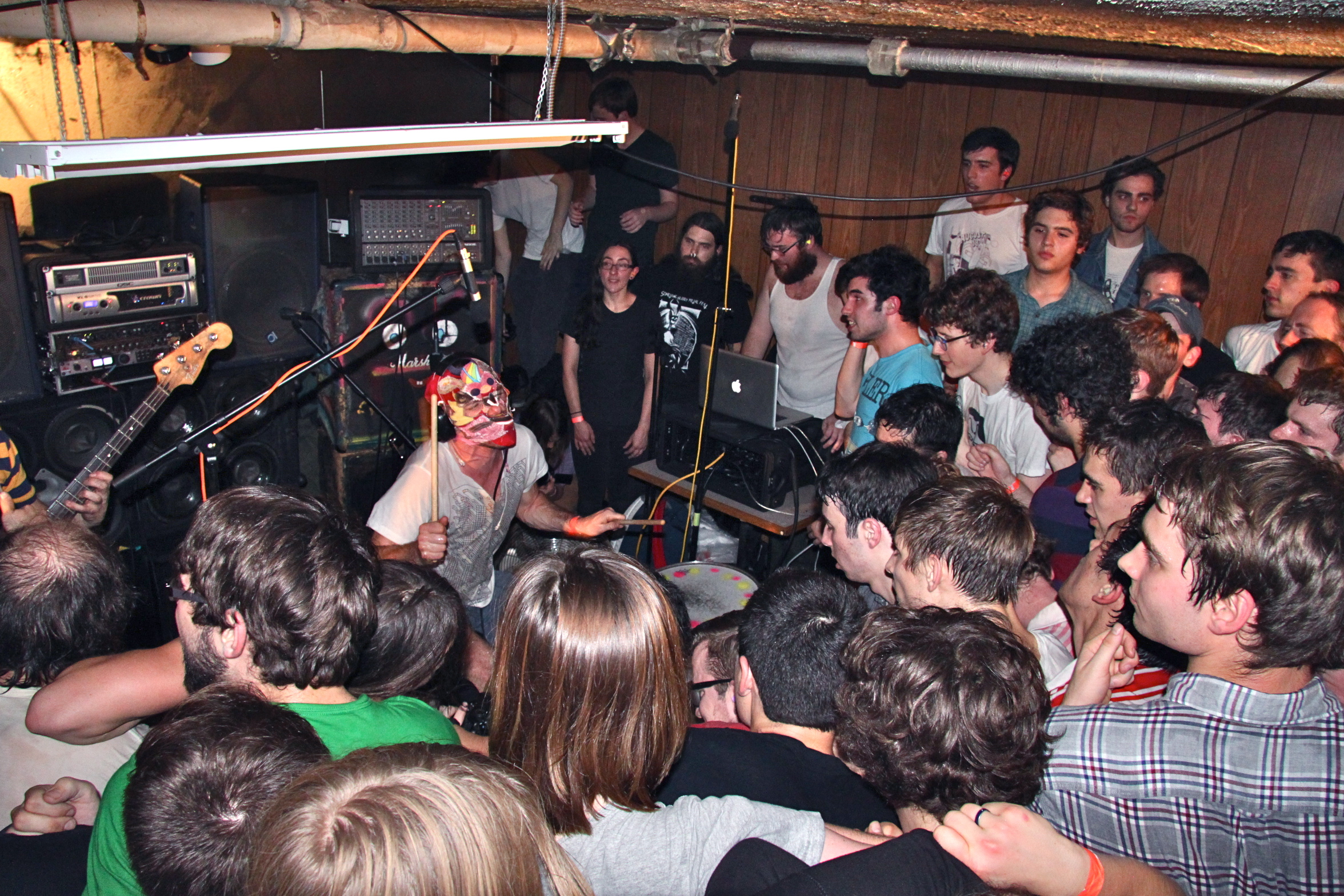
Lightning Bolt (2013) Boston Hassle Fest 5

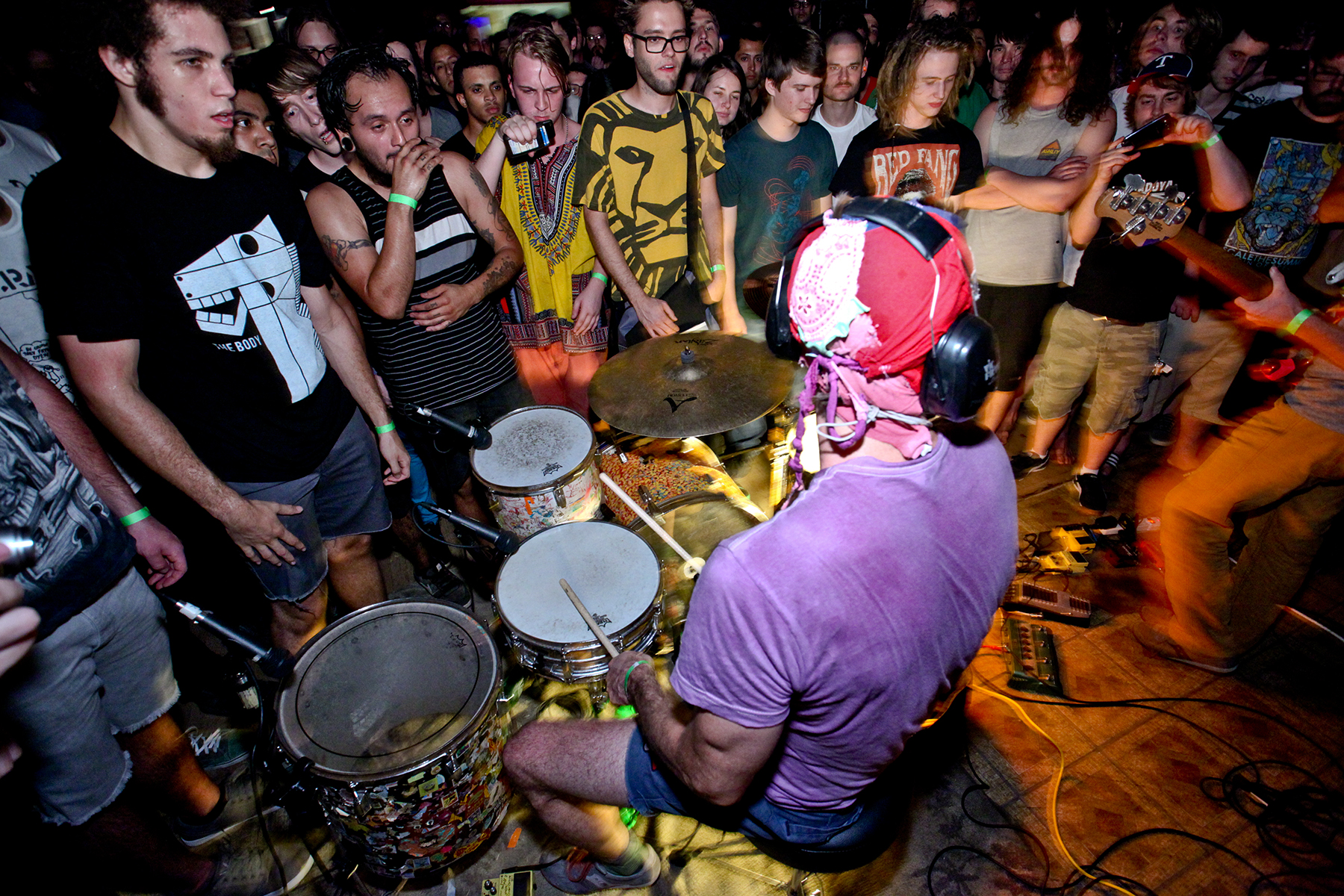
Lightning Bolt (2012) at Sons of Hermann Hall, Dallas

The band's music takes cues from Japanese noise rock bands such as Boredoms and Ruins, although composers Philip Glass and Sun Ra are acknowledged influences. The band's sound consists of Chippendale's frenetic drumming, his usually incomprehensible vocals, and Gibson's rhythmic bass guitar – an example of which is the song "13 Monsters", where Chippendale sings a playground style counting chant through heavy distortion over the instrumentals of his drums and Gibson's bass guitar. As for the band's genre, Brian Gibson is quoted as saying, "I hate, hate, hate the category ‘noise-punk.’ I really don't like being labeled with two words that have so much baggage. It's gross."

As the group's vocalist, Chippendale eschews a conventional microphone, instead using the type of microphone built into a household telephone receiver, held in his mouth or attached to a mask, which is then run through an effects processor to further alter the sound. Chippendale has also used a KMD 8021 Drum Exciter, a simple drum-synth module, triggered by the bass drum.

Gibson plays his bass guitar tuned to cello standard tuning, in intervals of fifths (C G D A), using a banjo string for the high A. He used this four-string setup for several years, but has recently been seen using a five-string setup, tuned to C G D A E, with banjo strings for the A and E. Gibson also uses several effects pedals, including overdrive pedals, an octaver, a delay pedal, and a whammy pedal (pitch shifter).

Like many noise rock bands, Lightning Bolt mostly plays extremely loud, aggressive music. In the film The Power of Salad, Gibson attributes much of their success to volume:

We used to get more negative reactions when [we] didn't have as loud of stuff. It's just, be super loud and you're all set. (laughs) The rock and roll has been revealed. I do feel that that's the message – if there's any message, that's what it is. This is kinda what we do to keep ourselves excited these days. In these days – everyone knows what I'm talking about. (laughs)

The band have reportedly never been fans of the studio recording process. When they recorded five tracks for their eponymous debut album released in 1999, they discarded four of them and replaced them with lo-fidelity tracks recorded at various live shows from 1997 and 1998. However, their following two albums, Ride the Skies and Wonderful Rainbow, were recorded more traditionally in a studio. For Hypermagic Mountain, half the tracks were recorded in studio, while the rest were performed and recorded in a house direct to a 2-track DAT master tape, where the audio engineer was unable to tell exactly how the final result would sound.

Since the band has only two members and two instruments, their sound has a somewhat limited range, though this is often noted as a positive thing. In one interview, Gibson states that his experiences in Lightning Bolt "has showed [him] the power of an extremely limited palette."

Lightning Bolt's lyrics, when decipherable, are generally tongue-in-cheek, covering such topics as fairy tales, heavy metal clichés, terrorism, anarchy, and superheroes. They delve occasionally into more political subjects, such as the anti-Bush "Dead Cowboy" from Hypermagic Mountain.

"13 Monsters"
An example of Lightning Bolt's rhythmic bass, frantic drums, and distorted vocals, from their 2001 album Ride the Skies.

== Live performances ==
Lightning Bolt are known for their so-called "guerrilla gigs", preferring to play on the floor of the venue rather than the stage, creating a tight circle of spectators around the band. They have also been known to start playing only a few seconds after the opening band finishes, often taking the audience by surprise. In 2004, Lightning Bolt played on the doorstep of radio DJ John Peel's chalet at noon during the All Tomorrow's Parties festival, about which neighbor Steve Albini of Shellac and Big Black commented "Best alarm clock I've ever had." They have also staged concerts in kitchens, on sidewalks, and in parking lots.

== Members ==
Present
- Brian Chippendale – drums (1994–present), vocals (1996–present)
- Brian Gibson – bass guitar (1994–present)

Former
- Hisham Bharoocha – vocals, percussion, effects (1994–1996)

== Discography ==
Albums

- Lightning Bolt (1999)
- Ride the Skies (2001)
- Wonderful Rainbow (2003)
- Hypermagic Mountain (2005)
- Earthly Delights (2009)
- Fantasy Empire (2015)
- Sonic Citadel (2019)

Collaborative Albums

- The Horizon Spirals / The Horizon Viral (with OOIOO) (2026)
