= Load Records =

American experimental independent record label

- Founded: 1993
- Founder: Ben McOsker, Laura Mullen
- Defunct: 2017
- Status: Defunct
- Genre: Noise; experimental rock; avant-garde; electronic
- Country of origin: U.S.
- Location: Providence, Rhode Island

Load Records was an American experimental music-oriented independent record label based out of Providence, Rhode Island. "Load Records might possibly be in possession of the world's most challenging record roster," writes Mark Hensch of Thrash Pit. "Rounded out by some of the most uncompromising noise/avant-garde/experimental artists in all of music's sordid underbelly, Load has always prided itself on remaining outside of common taste and maybe even common sense."

== History ==
Load Records was started by Ben McOsker in order to put a 7-inch record out for the band Boss Fuel. The label quickly became the most prominent source for noise music coming out of Providence, Rhode Island - loosely functioning in the same way that Sub Pop served grunge out of Seattle in the early 1990s. "Ben McOsker got into the business of running a label on a whim," said Stylus Magazine, "and now, after more than ten years of operation, Load Records has become one of the preeminent names in noise music. By signing acts like Lightning Bolt, Sightings and Noxagt, McOsker has expanded the notions of noise and helped bring numerous Providence bands to the ears of discerning listeners." Some claim McOsker and Mullen have released some of the most exciting noise/experimental music of the early 2000s, including music from Lightning Bolt, Neon Hunk, Metalux, Noxagt, and Friends Forever. Others have attributed a cookie-cutter aesthetic to the label, mostly in terms of the masks/costumes worn by a number of the bands. However, later records released by Load have run the gamut from strict noise-based squeal of Prurient and the Yellow Swans. Load also features a number of bands operating in a more metal vein such as Khanate, OvO, Necronomitron, and Brainbombs.

The music of Load Records is popularized and reviewed through national zines like Blastitude, Arthur, and Dead Angel.

On April 11, 2017, the label revealed it would be coming to an end: "After 24 years of Load Records its time to move on. Will be contacting bands to arrange next steps. Thanks for a great ride."

== Roster ==
- Air Conditioning
- Arab On Radar
- Astoveboat
- Brainbombs
- Burmese
- Coughs
- Excepter
- Fat Day
- Fat Worm of Error
- Forcefield
- Friends Forever
- Gerty Farish
- Giant Jesus
- Hawd Gankstuh Rappuh MC's
- the Hospitals
- thee Hydrogen Terrors
- Khanate
- Kites
- Kites/Prurient
- Landed
- Lightning Bolt
- Men's Recovery Project
- Metalux
- Mindflayer
- Monotract
- Mr. California and the State Police
- Mystery Brinkman
- Nautical Almanac
- Necronomitron
- Neon Hunk
- Noxagt
- the Ohsees (aka OCS)
- Olneyville Sound System
- OvO
- Pink and Brown
- Pleasurehorse
- Prurient
- the Scissor Girls
- Sightings
- Silver Daggers
- Six Finger Satellite
- Swordheaven
- Thee Hydrogen Terrors
- Tinsel Teeth
- Total Shutdown
- the USAISAMONSTER
- Ultralyd
- Vincebus Eruptum
- John Von Ryan
- Vaz
- the White Mice
- Whore Paint
- Wizardzz

== See also ==
- Load Records catalog
- List of record labels
