= List of bands formed in New York City =

This article contains a list of bands formed in New York City, New York. Bands should be notable and linked to their articles which lists their New York origins in the lead. References should be provided for any new entries on this list. Bands may be temporarily red-linked (while an article is developed) as long as the reference establishes that the band is notable and from New York.

== # ==
- 108
- 24-7 Spyz
- 2 in a Room

== A–F ==
- A Great Big Pile of Leaves
- A Place To Bury Strangers
- A Tribe Called Quest
- Agnostic Front
- Alice Donut
- AJR
- American Classical Orchestra
- American Composers Orchestra
- The Amygdaloids
- The Antlers
- Anthrax
- Bad Ronald
- Band of Susans
- Barkmarket
- Battles
- Bayside
- Beach Fossils
- Beastie Boys
- Blondie
- Blood, Sweat & Tears
- Bloodsimple
- Bloody Panda
- The Blue Flames
- Blue Öyster Cult
- Blues Magoos
- The Books
- Boys Choir of Harlem
- Brand New
- The Brandos
- Breakfast Club
- Breaking Laces
- Brutal Truth
- Burn
- C+C Music Factory
- The Cake
- Cameo
- The Candles
- Castevet
- Certain General
- Charanams
- Chic
- The Chiffons
- Cibo Matto
- Circus Mort
- The City and Horses
- Class Actress
- The Coachmen
- Coheed and Cambria
- The Cold Crush Brothers
- Company Flow
- The Cookies
- The Cramps
- The Cro-Mags
- The Crystals
- D Generation
- The Davenports
- Deee-Lite
- Defunkt
- De La Soul
- DeLeon
- The Devil Dogs
- The Dictators
- DIIV
- The Diplomats
- Dirty Projectors
- DJ Logic
- Dope
- Drowners
- The Druids of Stonehenge
- The Drums
- Elephant's Memory
- Envy On The Coast
- Errortype: Eleven
- Even Worse
- Fade (band)
- Fischerspooner
- Foreigner
- Fountains of Wayne
- Four to the Bar
- Freelance Whales
- Full Blown Chaos
- Fun
- Fun Lovin' Criminals

== G–M ==
- Gato Loco
- Geese
- The Ghost of a Saber Tooth Tiger
- Glassjaw
- Godcaster
- The Golden Filter
- Goodbye Picasso
- Gorilla Biscuits
- Grizzly Bear
- Groove Theory
- The Groupies
- Growing
- Gumball
- G-Unit
- The Heartbreakers
- Richard Hell and the Voidoids
- Helmet
- Hem
- Hercules and Love Affair
- Holy Ghost!
- The Hundred in the Hands
- Interpol
- The Indecent
- Ism
- Javelin
- Jawbreaker
- Jets to Brazil
- Kid Creole and the Coconuts
- Kinetics & One Love
- King Missile
- Kiss
- LCD Soundsystem
- Leftöver Crack
- The Little Orchestra Society
- Life Of Agony
- Living Colour
- Local Weatherman
- Lord Tariq and Peter Gunz
- Lotion
- The Lounge Lizards
- The Lovin' Spoonful
- The Mamas & the Papas
- Massacre
- Metal Allegiance
- Method Man & Redman
- Michael Hill's Blues Mob
- Midtown
- Miller Miller Miller & Sloan
- Mindless Self Indulgence
- MisterWives
- MNDR
- Mod Fun
- The Mooney Suzuki
- Murphy's Law

== N–S ==
- Nada Surf
- Naturally 7
- NBC Symphony Orchestra
- Neon Boys
- New York Bandura Ensemble
- New York Dolls
- New York Percussion Trio
- New York Philharmonic
- Ninja Sex Party
- Nuclear Assault
- One For All
- Orpheus Chamber Orchestra
- The Pains of Being Pure at Heart
- Paperdoll
- Park Avenue Chamber Symphony
- Parts & Labor
- Pretendo
- The Pretty Reckless
- Prong
- PS22 chorus
- Public Enemy
- Quicksand
- The Raelettes
- Ramones
- The Rapture
- Ratatat
- Riot V
- The Ronettes
- The Ropes
- Run-DMC
- School of Seven Bells
- Scissor Sisters
- Seguida
- The Shangri-Las
- Sheer Terror
- Shelter
- The Shondes
- Shootyz Groove
- Shy Child
- Sick of It All
- Silos
- Simon & Garfunkel
- Skaters
- Sleigh Bells
- Sonic Youth
- Soul Coughing
- Spacehog
- Spin Doctors
- Spread Eagle
- Steely Dan
- The Steinettes
- The Strangeloves
- The Strokes
- ST-X Ensemble
- Suffocation
- Swans
- Sylar (band)

== T–Z ==
- Taking Back Sunday
- Talking Heads
- Teenage Jesus and the Jerks
- Television
- Terror Squad
- Texas Is the Reason
- They Might Be Giants
- Tiny Masters of Today
- Toilet Böys
- Tomandandy
- Trachtenburg Family Slideshow Players
- Trilogy
- TV On The Radio
- Type O Negative
- Ui
- The Unlovables
- Unsane
- Vampire Weekend
- The Van Pelt
- The Velvet Underground
- Richard Hell and the Voidoids
- Versus
- The Waldorf-Astoria Orchestra
- Warzone
- Weep
- White Hills
- White Zombie
- Wu-Tang Clan
- X27
- Yeah Yeah Yeahs

== See also ==
- Lists of musicians
- List of people from New York City
