= Post-no wave =

Music genre

- Etymology: Refers to certain developments after no wave.
- Stylistic origins: No wave; avant-garde; noise music; experimental rock; free jazz
- Cultural origins: Early 1980s, United States
- Derivative forms: Brutal prog

Regional scenes
- Chicago, Illinois; Kansai, Japan

Other topics
- Noise rock; avant-punk; avant-prog

Post-no wave is a style and era of music that emerged from the original New York City no wave scene in the early to mid 1980s. It's considered to have arisen after the disintegration of the original scene in 1980, and encompasses an expansion of the scene in areas such as Chicago and Japan. It further differs from no wave by exploring new music genres, making use of modern technology and studio techniques, embracing rock or funk idioms, a greater rhythmic complexity or a tongue-in-cheek nihilistic humor. As a result, post-no wave usually fuses the angular and deconstructive approach of its predecessor with a more song-oriented sound.

Significant examples of post-no wave bands can be found in the works from former scenesters and new acts that were shaped by no wave in the 1980s —like Rat at Rat R, Sonic Youth and Swans—, the ephemeral Chicago No Wave scene in the 1990s and a nebula of scattered artists since the 2000s such as Erase Errata, Talk Normal, Liars and Gilla Band.

== History ==
Shortly after the recording of No New York in 1978, no wave, as an avant-garde movement and music scene, started disintegrating. The Gynecologists disbanded in 1978, Mars followed between 1978/1979, Teenage Jesus and the Jerks in 1979, Theoretical Girls in 1981, James Chance and the Contortions in 1981 and DNA in 1982. Several key artists then focused on non-musical projects or delved into more accessible rock genres. Lydia Lunch went on a solo career as a post-punk act, Rhys Chatham and Glenn Branca developed totalism in electric guitar ensembles, Arto Lindsay embarked on free improvisation and avant-garde jazz collaborations; others, such as Ut, The Lounge Lizards and Mofungo, continued playing until the 1990s, but far removed from their no wave roots. During this period, posthumous studio recordings and VV.AA. compilations from the scene were published for the first time, contributing to its underground popularity. While new generations of musicians outside the scene and from all around the world had been influenced by no-wave music, played with former scenesters —for instance, members from Sonic Youth and Swans played in Chatham's and Branca's ensembles— or claimed to be its successors. Thus, no longer a scene or a movement, a post-no wave came into existence.

Although other expressions have been used to describe this kind of music (second wave of no wave or no wave revival), Marc Masters helped popularize the term post-no wave in the 2000s, following its coinage in the 1990s

== Regional scenes ==
=== Kansai no wave ===
Kansai no wave was a regionalized extension of New York city no wave, and consisted of early Japanese punk and noise music artists centered around Osaka, Kobe, Kyoto and other parts of the Kansai region in the late 1970s and early 1980s. Artists included Aunt Sally, Inu, Ultra Bide members Hide and Jojo Hiroshige, and SS. The movement later influenced the development of the Japanoise scene.

=== Chicago no wave ===
Chicago no wave was a music scene based in Chicago, Illinois during the early-to mid 1990s. The term was coined by Weasel Walter of the Flying Luttenbachers who began describing bands he played with as "Chicago no wave" in reference to New York City no wave. Other notable acts included Scissor Girls, U.S. Maple, and Brise-Glace.

== See also ==
- Neutral Records
- Lumpen (magazine)
- Skin Graft Records

== Bibliography ==
- Cilia, Eddy (1998). Smashing Pumpkins: Il mondo è un vampiro (in Italian). Giunti Editore. ISBN 978-8809215245.
- Gorman, Paul (2022). Totally Wired: The Rise and Fall of the Music Press. Thames and Hudson Ltd. ISBN 978-0500022634.
- Earles, Andrew (2023). Gimme Indie Rock: 500 Essential American Underground Rock Albums 1981–1996 (Kindle ed.). Voyageur Press. ISBN 978-1627883795.
- Molon, Dominic; Diederichsen, Diedrich; Elms, Anthony; Graham, Dan; Hell, Richard; Higgs, Matthew; Kelley, Mike; Koether, Jutta; Nickas, Bob; Tumlir, Jan (2007). Sympathy for the Devil: Art and Rock and Roll Since 1967. Yale University Press. ISBN 978-0300134261.
- Gendron, Bernard (2002). Between Montmartre and the Mudd Club: Popular Music and the Avant-Garde (73rd ed.). University of Chicago Press. ISBN 978-0226287379.
- Kostelanetz, Richard (2001). A Dictionary of the Avant-Gardes (2nd ed.). Routledge. ISBN 978-0415937641.
