= Chicago no wave =

Music scene

- Stylistic origins: No wave
- Cultural origins: 1990s, Chicago, Illinois

Other topics
- Kansai no wave; post-no wave; Chicago school

Chicago no wave was a music scene based in Chicago, Illinois in the 1990s. The term was coined by Weasel Walter of the Flying Luttenbachers who, in the early-to-mid-1990s, began describing his bands and the bands they played with as "Chicago no wave" in reference to New York City no wave. Other notable acts included Scissor Girls, U.S. Maple, and Brise-Glace.

== History ==
In the early-to-mid-1990s, Weasel Walter began to describe his bands and the bands they played with as "Chicago no wave." These acts formed the growing Wicker Park underground rock scene and included Walter's own band the Flying Luttenbachers, Scissor Girls, Trenchmouth, and Quintron. The bands played together at now-defunct venues such as the Czar Bar, Milk of Burgundy, and the Magnatroid.

According to Walter, the beginning of the Chicago no wave era was marked by a well-attended concert at the Czar Bar in Chicago on the 29th of January 1993. The concert featured the Flying Luttenbachers, Scissor Girls, and Trenchmouth. Another concert, on the 11th of February 1994 at the Cabaret Metro, featured the Flying Luttenbachers, Scissor Girls, and Math, and was characterized by Walter as a "bizarre, improbable high point in the public profile of the nascent Chicago No Wave." It was attended by 800 people.

Couch, from nearby Ann Arbor, Michigan, was connected to the Chicago no wave scene. The band eschewed conventional song elements such as choruses or hooks, with their music instead characterized by abstraction and intensity. Quintron has noted Couch's first performance in his Chicago theater as having been highly controversial, but also that he "liked the Michigan noise scene better [than the Chicago scene] because it was freer and funnier. Couch was handsdown the king of that whole spirit."

In 1993, Couch's James Marlon Magas and Peter Larson co-founded Bulb Records; their first release was a four-song seven-inch by Couch. In the mid-1990s, Magas moved to Chicago and formed Lake of Dracula alongside Heather Melowic of Scissor Girls and Weasel Walter.

In the mid-1990s, an audio documentary about the Chicago no wave scene was produced by Burke Patten. It was later remastered and edited by Weasel Walter in 2012. The documentary featured speakers like Walter, Bobby Conn, James Marlon Magas, Kelly Kuvo, and Kevin Drumm and music by artists like Bobby Conn, the Flying Luttenbachers, Math, Duotron, Scissor Girls, and others. In the documentary, Weasel Walter stated:

I feel really fortunate because, I guess, I didn't have to make any of this up... it's not like I'm trying to get my name into the history books, it's just like... during this certain period of time there were all these interesting people around who were doing their own things and we had some aesthetic similarities, although a lot of the bands were really different. But the continuity was we all had sort of the same aesthetics and the same drive and the fact that our musics were not what you would hear on the radio [...].

== Related genres ==
=== Brutal prog ===
Brutal prog is a music genre coined by Weasel Walter to describe the style of his band the Flying Luttenbachers. Writer David M. Pecoraro of Pitchfork characterized the style as a blend of punk, jazz, skronk, metal and improv music.

== Bibliography ==
- Crandall, Phillip (2014). Andrew W.K.'s I Get Wet. Bloomsbury Publishing. ISBN 978-1623565503.
- Armbrust, Walter, ed. (2000). Mass Mediations: New Approaches to Popular Culture in the Middle East and Beyond. University of California Press. p. 378. ISBN 978-0520219267.
