= Destructo Noise Explosion!: Live at WNUR 2-6-92 =

Live at WNUR 2-6-92

Live album by The Flying Luttenbachers
- Released: 1992
- Recorded: February 6, 1992 at Northwestern University, Chicago, Illinois
- Genre: Noise rock
- Length: 43:22
- Label: ugEXPLODE

The Flying Luttenbachers chronology
Live at WNUR 2-6-92 (1992)	Constructive Destruction (1994)

Professional ratings
Review scores
Source	Rating
Allmusic	4/5 stars

Live at WNUR 2-6-92 is a live album by The Flying Luttenbachers, released in 1992 through ugEXPLODE.

== Track listing ==
Side one
No.	Title	Writer(s)	Length
1.	"Survivors Suite"		5:34
2.	"Playing in the Dumpster"	Weasel Walter	7:05
3.	"Witches and Devils"	Albert Ayler	5:37
4.	"Throwing Bricks"	Weasel Walter	5:23

Side two
No.	Title	Writer(s)	Length
1.	"Edge of Night"		6:10
2.	"3 Free"	Hal Russell	4:08
3.	"Ghosts"	Albert Ayler	4:33
4.	"Sram"	Hal Russell	4:52

== Personnel ==
- Chad Organ – tenor saxophone
- Hal Russell – tenor saxophone, soprano saxophone, trumpet
- Weasel Walter – drums, clarinet
