= Long Hair in Three Stages =

Long Hair In Three Stages

Studio album by U.S. Maple
- Released: October 24, 1995
- Recorded: 1995
- Studios: Solid Sound Studios, Illinois
- Genres: Math rock; experimental rock; noise rock; post-rock; postmodern
- Length: 31:44
- Label: Skin Graft
- Producer: Jim O'Rourke

U.S. Maple chronology
Long Hair In Three Stages (1995)	Sang Phat Editor (1997)

Long Hair In Three Stages is the debut studio album by the Chicago-based experimental rock quartet U.S. Maple. After recording a debut single, they recorded the album in late 1995 at the Solid Sound Studios in Illinois with producer Jim O'Rourke. It was O'Rourke's first recording session with a rock band.

== Background and recording ==
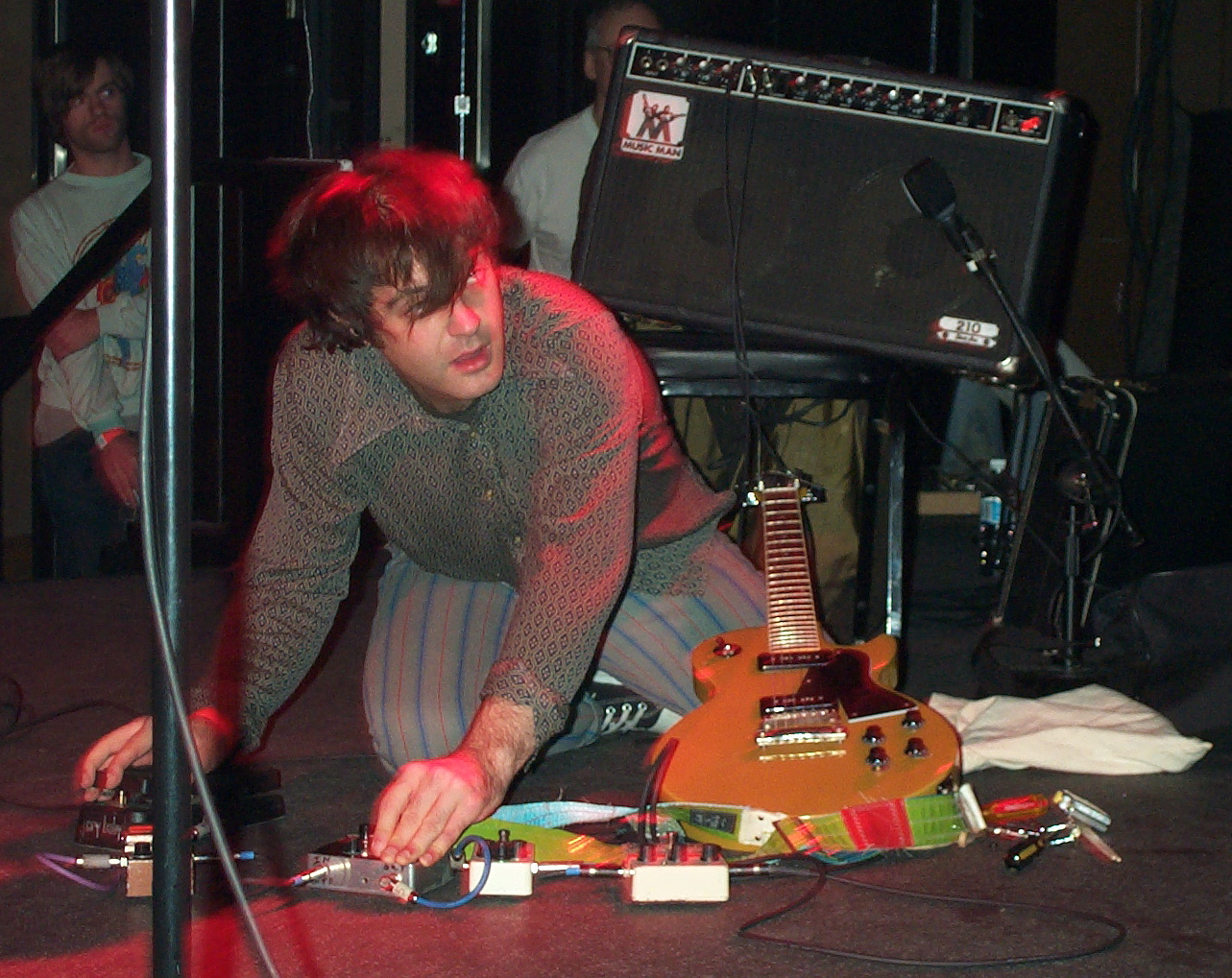
Long Hair in Three Stages was produced by Jim O'Rourke.

U.S. Maple formed as a math rock quartet in early 1995 from the remnants of two different bands at DeKalb's Northern Illinois University; lead singer Al Johnson and "high" guitarist Mark Shippy were in Shorty, while drummer Pat Samson and "low" guitarist Todd Rittman spent their time with the Mercury Players. After the breakup of the two bands, the members met to see how they could "deconstruct rock, only to leave its most basic elements." Music journalist Andrew Earles said that the band was formed when "four members from two different bands met on a Chicago street corner and began discussing how to "erase rock and roll from their collective minds,"" with the band then setting out "to devise a working method for reorganizing the rock and rock, keeping what we feel are its most important core elements." Chicago independent record label Skin Graft Records quickly took notice of the band and signed them in the fall of that year. Their first release was the seven-inch single "Stuck" with the B-side "When a Man Says "Ow!"", with both tracks recorded in September 1995 at the Easley McCain Recording recording studio in Memphis, Tennessee. Doug Easley, who founded and owned the studio, manned the production boards for the session.

Very shortly afterwards, the band began work on their first album, which they named Long Hair in Three Stages. They hired Jim O'Rourke to produce the album and it was recorded late 1995 at Solid Sound Studios in Hoffman Estates, Illinois, a studio much closer to the band's home than Easley McCain Recording. It was O'Rourke's first legitimate recording session with a rock band, and he would later go on, in Johnson's words, to become "an esteemed and highly sought after producer for many bands." The band decided that the B-side of "Stuck", "When a Man Says "Ow!"", would reappear on the album.

== Musical style ==
Long Hair in Three Stages has been characterized as a noise rock, experimental rock, math rock and post-rock album with strong similarities to no wave and post-punk. It is also considered to be a defining album of the "now wave" genre, a term that Skin Graft coined to refer to "a loose collective of angular-punk experimentalists based in Chicago" that carried on the legacy of no wave. Nitsuh Abebe of AllMusic said that the album combines "angular guitar attacks, odd skronks, jazzy tones, and a generally deconstructive approach to music into a sound of unparalleled idiosyncrasy,". One critic said that "the substance of the sound is definitely blues, chords, scales, as transfigured, denounce an almost obsessive attention to the respect of the canvas, albeit in a form decidedly postmodern." Another critic said that "if one were to deconstruct their sound, each element would make absolutely no sense, yet together, a bizarrely rich (and thankfully bereft of the wackiness that plagues most 'weird' bands) whole emerges."

A defining characteristic of the album is the intertwining of Mark Shippy's "high" guitar work and Todd Ritman's "low" guitar work. Devin Friesen of Tiny Mix Tapes said that "the intertwined guitar lines sounded like hiccuping contortions, as if scraps of rock n’ roll progressions were twisted, melted down, and remade into something else entirely. And even that's too organized of an explanation, as whenever U.S. Maple would lock into a rhythmic groove, transition, or even a sustained melody, they would either take it somewhere else or abandon the idea completely." Perfect Sound Forever magazine said that "generally Todd Rittmann's 'low' guitar provides a heavy bottom while Mark Shippy keeps his playing on the high end." Peter Margasack of The Chicago Reader compared the music to Captain Beefheart's late 1960s work with the Magic Band, saying "the group’s complex, post Captain Beefheart rhythmic scheme upends standard grooves into a dizzying array of heaving stops and starts and polymetric irregularities, if there was ever a post-punk Trout Mask Replica, U.S. Maple’s debut is it."

Although Long Hair in Three Stages set the general consensus of US Maple as "deconstructionalists of rock and roll," the band have since disavowed the notion that they were deliberately deconstructing anything, rather, according to guitarist Mark Shippy, just "constructing things differently." Indeed, Perfect Sound Forever said the album "contained a few moments with recognizable beats" and that "compared to their following albums, Long Hair is unusually straightforward." Regardless, Ondarock said the album "deepens the insights of the individual accentuating the vein and free improvisation of the band. Jim O'Rourke in the control room helps the four to give their best, scattering small found along the entire album, but to emerge strongly from the 10 tracks is the visionary talent of Maple." Michael H Little of The Vinyl District said "each and every note of each and every song was constructed with a formalist’s care."

== Composition ==
"Hey King" starts with a "lopsided and limping rhythm, on which rantolano guitars and writhe, and then explode in all its force by dragging gait that stuns and disorients. Al Johnson howls unintelligible phonemes, while the agile and essential drumming of Samson is so determined to look for order and sense of rhythm in a mixture." H Little said that the song begins with "a barrage of drums and Shippy’s high guitar, which sounds as if it's struggling to break into something recognizable as a song, but it stumbles and pratfalls like a Beckett clown until, low [sic] and behold, he's playing a perfectly linear solo. Then Rittman comes in and a kind of moaning groove develops and Johnson commences vocalizing incoherently in that deranged hiss of his, letting out a cool “Ooooo!” in the process. The song ends in a staggering groove, then stops abruptly."

"Letter to ZZ Top" is, as the name suggests, a tribute song written for hard rock/boogie rock band ZZ Top, which Abebe said "pretty much rules out any notion of normality" with lyrics like "Give my bones to Billy Gibbons." The song contains unintelligible vocals, and, in the words of H Little, showcases Johnson "whispering like a mental patient confiding some great delusion and singing “Give my bones to Billy Gibbons, Ooooo!” and stuttering and repeating, “And you say… you asshole” while the song picks up momentum and Shippy plays a bona fide solo. For once U.S. Maple doesn't feel obligated to self-sabotage its own propulsion; I would go say far as to say “Letter to ZZ Top” is their equivalent of a commercial move, except the song has zero, and I mean zilch, commercial potential."

"Home Made Job" opens with Shippy's guitar "having an anxiety attack" while Rittman's plays a "very dissonant groove until the drums kick in and Johnson comes in moaning and begging in a deeper voice, like a street person on sterno importuning you for a dollar. And once again they actually keep the groove moving, Rittman throwing in bizarre guitar riffs and then shredding while Samson bashes away at the drums." "Magic Job" features a "semi-solid" rhythm and the continuing "buzzing, strange progress" of the guitars.

""Aplomado" opens with some distorted drums and guitars sounding like they’re trying to get something started. Finally a melody of sorts emerges, and Johnson enters on stage left hissing and squealing, “Heat… Heat… Heat… Heat!” while Rittman plays humongous riffs and Rittman plays scratchy riffs until what is either a trumpet or a synthesizer (neither listed on the credits) or perhaps even one really strangely tuned guitar comes in, sounding really fucked up. Then the song slows, the guitarists play out-of-kilter and the melody (such as it at is) reemerges just in time for the song to end."

— Michael H. Little of The Vinyl District referring to "Apolmado".

One reviewer commented that "State is Bad" "flat out rocks." It opens with several stray piano notes and scratchy and ominously tentative guitar riffs, before "Rittman and the drums take off, Shippy firing off high-pitched riffs over their heads, until Johnson comes in and the song accelerates" in a way compared to Sonic Youth before alternating between stop-and-start and "that really fast groove," and in the words of H Little, "then they really go wild, Shippy going at it like a maniac while Rittman lays down big riffs, before the song opens up, Johnson sings, “The state was bad/And if I come back I’m dumb,” and the song closes in a caterwaul." "Aplomado" is a "towering" and "sly" song featuring distorted drums and large riffs. "You Know What… Will Get You You Know Where" opens with Rittman playing a heavy riff while Shippy plays a cool repetitive riff as Samson bashes away, whilst "When a Man Says “Ow”" is a "strange and dissonant" song that is "almost blues" that towards its end morphs into a strange and choppy instrumental."

"Northwad" is said to anticipate "the sonic deconstruction process" that reached its summit on the band's following album Sang Phat Editor (1997). A "truly strange" song, it begins with "some odd flapping noise as Shippy plays riffs that sound exactly like a squealing pig. And the rhythm, such as it is, limps along to the sound of lots of distorted guitar punctuation until Johnson commences throwing out more unintelligible lines like verbal karate chops while the guitars fire off a dissonant riff here, a dissonant riff there, everywhere a dissonant riff riff. Then the song, which has never really been a song, breaks for a drum solo, then goes quiet before it gets louder and hobbles away into silence, but not without a happy-go-lucky little guitar figure at the end." The concluding track, "Lady to Bing", is an instrumental said to recall Captain Beefheart's Trout Mask Replica.

== Release ==
Long Hair in Three Stages was released on October 24, 1995, by Skin Graft Records on CD and LP, with the LP edition containing a bonus track, "Found a Place to Have My Kittens." A promotional version was also released on cassette. The band and Skin Graft Records' CEO, Mark Fischer, traveled to Fischer's father's metal manufacturing shop in St. Louis, Missouri to create the packaging of the LP edition. According to Fisher's design, "we would to turn raw material into album jackets. Large sheets of aluminum were sectioned, trimmed and cut to size by the five of us. The jackets were then punch-pressed and the edges dulled. The spine alone required three precise bends. Each jacket was then hand polished by everyone, leaving no two alike. More than fifty hours hard labor went into the making and design for the album jackets alone." Due to the individually crafted sleeves, approximately 1,000 copies of the LP were made, and as such the LP edition became a rare, collector's item. All copies of the LP sold out within its first month of release. No singles were released from the album, but the band produced a music video for "State is Bad."

The album was remastered for re-release by Skin Graft Records on 21 June 2013. It was available as a CD, with all artwork printed using three classy metallic pantone inks, and a LP in three variations: two metal sleeved limited edition LP variants and a standard issue version, marking the first time it was released on LP in a standard "printed" issue. The same sheet metal shop was used to fabricate the metal sleeve variations, which were different and immediately discernible from the original 1995 LP copies. The metal sleeved editions will also include a metallic pantone printed lyric card inside the jacket, and unlike the original run of sleeves which were crimped and folded on the right side, they were crimped at the bottom. Each of the metal sleeve editions was hand polished differently, featuring the band name embossed into the metal on the front and an individual control number embossed on the back, so that no two will be alike. It was originally intended for release in May 2013, but it was not ready by "press time" as the original metal stamper broke at the pressing plant, which forced Skin Graft to go back to the lacquer stage. Rittmann made use of the extra time to remaster the bonus track, "Found a Place to Have My Kittens."

== Critical reception ==
Professional ratings
Review scores
Source	Rating
AllMusic	4/5 stars
Musikexpres	5/7
Eddy Silia	4/5 stars
The Vinyl District	A

Long Hair in Three Stages was released to very positive reviews from music critics. Alternative Press said the album "reaffirms an ideal: that there's still more to be done with electric guitars." German magazine Musikexpress rated the album a score of five out of seven. Peter Margasask of the Chicago Reader called the album "a stunning debut" which proves "that noise can be more than just a racket." Skin Graft Records themselves acknowledged the critical acclaim on their website. The band soon found themselves flying Coach to Deutschland for a European tour. The extensive six-week tour spanned twelve countries and included a Peel Session for John Peel's BBC Radio show. It was followed by the release of "The Wanderer" non-album single in 1996.

Retrospective reception to the album has been similarly favorable. Todd Lamb of SF Weekly called it a "noisy classic." Nick Hutchings of The Quietus commented that the album was "difficult yet rewarding." Scott McGaughey of Perfect Sound Forever said that "the best moments occur when the two guitars meet and then quickly fall back into their individual spaces. Maple began racking up Captain Beefheart comparisons, but simply calling them "Beefheart-ish" doesn't do their sound justice. U.S. Maple's music is even more vicious and frightening than Beefheart's." Spin said the album "defined their chaotic vibe." Nitsuh Abebe of AllMusic said that the album is "nothing short of stunning," and commented that "the record's finest moments come when the slanted attack and fractured composition converge to simulate something approaching a conventional song," highlighting "Letter to ZZ Top" as an example and concluding that "between these off-kilter constructions and the group's even more off-kilter deconstructions, a truly amazing record is created, one that combines hard-edged, "whiskey, no chaser" rock with exceptionally intelligent slants and fractures.

Michael H Little of The Vinyl District grade the album "A" and, after an analysis of each song, concluded in his review that "You owe it to yourself and your unborn children to listen to and ardently loathe U.S. Maple, only (if you’re as obstinate as I am) to grow to love them, because they made sounds the human ear would never have heard otherwise. It is my most ardent belief that nothing succeeds like a grand failure—who would remember the Titanic if it hadn’t sunk? U.S. Maple knew this right down to its contrarian bones. Far better a band that fails on its own terms than one that succeeds on somebody else’s. Especially if that failure sounds as fresh and obstinately alive as U.S. Maple's." Ondarock commented that "the logic pursued by Maple is not far from that developed" from Sonic Youth's earliest music, "adventurous music and "avant" in substance, but covered with rock moods," saying that U.S. Maple show the no wave genre reaching "its highest expression. The decadent and morbid sound of Sonic Youth is subjected to a further process of fragmentation, even the last remnants of meaning present in the music of New Yorkers are finally swept away in favor of a pataphysic mood and lacking any referent." They referred to the album as a "masterpiece." Monica Kendrick of the Chicago Reader said that the album "was a gauntlet thrown down at the feet of that entire scene, and U.S. Maple never topped it." Music writer Eddy Silia rated the album four stars out of five in his 2000 book Post rock e oltre. Introduzione alle musiche del 2000 (Post-Rock: Introduction to the Music of 2000).

== Legacy ==
In 1999, Alternative Press ranked the album at number 85 in its list of "The 90 Greatest Albums of the 90s," the only album by U.S. Maple included in the list. In 2014, music journalist Andrew Earles included the album in his book Gimme Indie Rock: 500 Essential American Underground Rock Albums 1981–1996, saying that "goes damn far towards deconstructing [rock and roll] down to nothing, and then rebuilding it into something with all the parts in the wrong places but miraculously maintaining its idiosyncratic self-made style as a form of underground and experimental rock." In 2014, About Entertainment ranked the album at number 4 in their list of the "Top 10 Math-Rock Albums," saying the album "arrived right when math rock was starting to develop its identity. The LP was generally received as a noisy, chaotic mess, but listening to songs like "Magic Job" —whose guitars sound like a swarm of hornets— reveals a band that, in their Beefheartian way, were so well-drilled every seeming accident was precisely timed." Musician E. Ryan Goodmann commented in an interview that "when I first heard Shorty's Fresh Breath and U.S. Maple's Long Hair in Three Stages, I said to myself, 'now this is new music!' They furthered my curiosity and excitement all the way up to Acre Thrills. Ever since they broke up I have found nothing to take their place." Former Black Flag singer Henry Rollins played "When a Man Says 'Ow'" on his KRCW radio show in 2011.

== Track listing ==
All tracks written by US Maple.

No.	Title	Length
1.	"Hey King"	3:36
2.	"Letter to ZZ Top"	3:07
3.	"Home-Made Stuff"	3:36
4.	"Magic Job"	2:40
5.	"State Is Bad"	4:40
6.	"Aplomado"	1:55
7.	"You Know What... Will Get You You Know Where"	3:07
8.	"When a Man Says 'Ow'"	2:42
9.	"Northwad"	3.38
10.	"Lady to Bing"	2.24

LP issue
No.	Title	Length
11.	"Found A Place To Have My Kittens"	2:06

== Personnel ==
- Al Johnson - vocals
- Todd Rittman - guitar
- Mark Shippy- guitar
- Pat Samson - drums
- Jim O'Rourke – producer
