= We People Space with Phantoms =

Studio album by The Scissor Girls
- Released: 1996
- Recorded: October 1994
- Genre: No wave
- Length: 41:52
- Label: Atavistic Records

The Scissor Girls chronology
From: The Scissor Girls To: The Imaginary Layer On Skeletons (1994)	We People Space with Phantoms (1996)	Here is the 'Is-Not' (1997)

Professional ratings
Review scores
Source	Rating
Allmusic	3/5 stars

We People Space with Phantoms is the second album recorded by the Chicago-based no wave band The Scissor Girls. The album was recorded with the original Scissor Girls lineup, consisting of Azita Youssefi on bass guitar and vocals, SueAnne Zollinger on guitar, and Heather Melowic on drums. This was the final recording to include Zollinger, who left the band following the album's second recording session due to conflicts with other band members.

She was replaced by new member Kelly Kuvo, and the album sat unreleased for two years before the Scissor Girls were able to find a label willing to release the material. This label was Atavistic Records, which agreed in 1996 to issue the album. Kurt Kellison of Atavistic then offered the Scissor Girls a chance to record two further albums for the indie label, an offer which Youssefi and Melowic accepted, but which Kuvo declined.

== Track listing ==
1. The Sequential (2:46)
2. A Dedication To Cronies And Goats (4:36)
3. In Two Acts (6:26)
4. Vamps, Here! (3:13)
5. Dismemberment Murder (4:16)
6. Skeletal/Binary (4:15)
7. World Of Unreal Time (3:05
8. Forecast Total Brain Shut-Dwn (2:45)
9. S. Mongers (2:10)
10. Anti-FUT Nos. 1, 2 (5:08)
11. Untitled (3:19)

== Personnel ==
- The Scissor Girls - Main performer
- Azita Youssefi - Bass, vocals
- SueAnne Zollinger - Guitar
- Heather Melowic - Drums
