= Constructive Destruction =

Studio album by The Flying Luttenbachers
- Released: 1994
- Recorded: October 12, 1993, at King Size, Chicago, Illinois
- Genre: Noise rock
- Length: 42:46
- Label: ugEXPLODE

The Flying Luttenbachers chronology
Destructo Noise Explosion! (1992)	Constructive Destruction (1994)	Destroy All Music (1995)

Professional ratings
Review scores
Source	Rating
AllMusic	4/5 stars
The Encyclopedia of Popular Music	3/5 stars

Constructive Destruction is an album by the Flying Luttenbachers. It was released in 1994 by ugEXPLODE.

== Critical reception ==
The Chicago Tribune called the album a "timeless barrage of guitars, drums and saxophones straining to break free from conventional song structure." CMJ New Music Monthly deemed it "splintery, celebratory jazz played with hardcore punk velocity and intensity."

== Track listing ==
All tracks are written by Weasel Walter, except "Brainstorm" by Chad Organ.

No.	Title	Length
1.	"The Critic Stomp"	4:18
2.	"Pointed Stick - 93B"	6:33
3.	"The Indiscreet Notion"	7:20
4.	"Fist Through Glass"	2:58
5.	"Playing in the Dumpster"	3:38
6.	"Eaten by Sharks"	5:53
7.	"Brainstorm"	5:29
8.	"Coffeehouse in Flames"	6:37

== Personnel ==
- Jeb Bishop – bass guitar, trombone
- Chad Organ – tenor saxophone
- Dylan Posa – guitar
- Weasel Walter – drums
- Ken Vandermark – tenor saxophone, soprano clarinet, bass clarinet
