= Revenge (The Flying Luttenbachers album) =

Studio album by The Flying Luttenbachers
- Released: August 20, 1996
- Recorded: January 3, 1996–January 5, 1996 at upEXPLODE Studios, Chicago, Illinois
- Genre: Noise rock
- Length: 38:46
- Label: Skin Graft
- Producer: The Flying Luttenbachers

The Flying Luttenbachers chronology
Destroy All Music (1995)	Revenge (1996)	Gods of Chaos (1998)

Professional ratings
Review scores
Source	Rating
Allmusic	4/5 stars
Alternative Press	5/5 stars

Revenge is the third album by The Flying Luttenbachers, released on August 20, 1996 through Skin Graft Records.

== Track listing ==
No.	Title	Length
1.	"Storm of Shit"	4:25
2.	"Spasms"	4:03
3.	"Number Three"	2:24
4.	"4,5,6"	3:14
5.	"Clank"	4:08
6.	"Murder Machine Muzak"	4:23
7.	"Thoughts for Americans"	4:40
8.	"Mercury Retrograde"	4:05
9.	"Death Ray"	2:14
10.	"The Holy Mountain"	5:10

== Personnel ==
The Flying Luttenbachers

- Chuck Falzone – guitar
- Bill Pisarri – bass guitar, violin, clarinet, cover art
- Weasel Walter – drums, cover art

Production and additional personnel

- The Flying Luttenbachers – production
- Greg Gold – photography
- Mike Hagler – mastering
