= Talker (album) =

Studio album by U.S. Maple
- Released: 1999
- Studio: B.C., New York City
- Genre: Art rock, noise rock
- Label: Drag City
- Producer: Michael Gira

U.S. Maple chronology
Sang Phat Editor (1997)	Talker (1999)	Acre Thrills (2001)

Talker is the third album by the American band U.S. Maple, released in 1999. It was their first album for Drag City Records. The band supported it with a North American tour that included a stint opening for Pavement.

== Production ==
Recorded over 10 days at B.C. Studio, in New York City, the album was produced by Michael Gira, who worked with the band to achieve a leaner sound and advise on overdubs. U.S. Maple were primarily influenced by the blues, experimental music, and Captain Beefheart, unlike many of their Chicago band contemporaries, who were attracted more to Brazilian music and jazz influences. Frontman Al Johnson admired the lyrical clichés and language of 1970s classic rock, which he adopted for his lyrics. He rejected the experimental music label, instead claiming that U.S. Maple was a rock band creating rock music.

== Critical reception ==
Professional ratings
Review scores
Source	Rating
AllMusic	4/5 stars
Pitchfork	8.5/10
Spin	8/10

The Globe and Mail noted that "swamp-horror noise and jigsaw-puzzle riffs meet ... Johnson's howls and groans." The Philadelphia Inquirer opined that "somewhere between the sonic morass of Pere Ubu and the fey artifice of Roxy Music lies the deconstructionist sound of U.S. Maple." The Rocket called Talker "a very unique and clever album devoid of the oft-accused mathrock pretense associated with these post-noiserock, post-Skin Graft veterans." Spin stated that "you can actually hear [rock 'n' roll] rules being crushed altogether and the results still ... swing."

The Staten Island Advance said that the band's "unusual, atonal instrument voicings, tribalistic rhythms and bizarre sing song intonations create an eerie unworldly environment." The Chicago Tribune labeled the album "a spacious, mesmerizing soundscape of microtonal guitar chords, twisted rhythms and imaginatively offbeat songcraft that potently fulfills both components of the 'art-rock' formula." Two years later, the paper concluded that "this abstract, ungainly beast of an album ... increasingly sounds like a classic."

In 2021, Record Collector included Talker on its list of "10 of the Best" Chicago noise rock albums.

== Track listing ==
No.	Title	Length
1.	"Bumps and Guys"
2.	"Running from Kabob"
3.	"Go to Bruises"
4.	"More Horror"
5.	"Apollo, Don't You Crust"
6.	"Breeze, It's Your High School"
7.	"Stupid Deep Indoors"
8.	"[untitled]"
9.	"So Long Bonus..."
