= Azita Youssefi =

Iranian-American experimental musician

- Born: January 18, 1971 (age 54); St. Louis, Missouri, United States
- Occupation(s): Musician, artist
- Instrument(s): Vocals, piano, bass
- Years active: 1991–present
- Website: http://www.azita.info

Azita Youssefi (Persian: آزیتا یوسفی; born January 18, 1971, in St. Louis, Missouri) is an Iranian-American experimental musician, artist and music teacher based in Chicago. She was originally associated with the Chicago no wave scene, which included bands such as the Scissor Girls, U.S. Maple and Bride of No No.

She has been a voice and piano teacher at Chicago's Old Town School of Folk Music since 2002, and has served as composer and musical director for theater productions of musicals by Brian Torrey Scott.

== Background ==
Born in the United States to Iranian parents, Azita spent part of her childhood in Iran and was attending grade school in Tehran when the Iranian revolution began in late 1978. Her family moved back to the United States soon after, settling in Bethesda, Maryland. Growing up, she attended an all-girls school, Holton-Arms, and studied classical piano. As a teen, she would attend punk rock shows in Washington, D.C. In 1989, Azita moved to Chicago to study at the Art Institute of Chicago. She speaks Persian.

== Musical career ==
=== Scissor Girls ===
Disillusioned with the visual arts as a medium for expression, she turned to performance art and sound. In 1991, she formed the spastic noise-rock group The Scissor Girls with Sue Anne Zollinger on guitar (later replaced by Kelly Kuvo), Heather Melowic on drums, and herself on vocals and bass. Their live performances were highly theatrical and the members often dressed in homemade costumes ranging from Catholic schoolgirl uniforms to clothes made of Bubble Wrap and duct tape. After two albums and a singles compilation, the Scissor Girls broke up in late 1996.

=== Miss High Heel ===
In late 1995, Azita played synthesizer for a short-lived Weasel Walter/Jim O'Rourke project Miss High-Heel. Their self-titled CD was released on B-Sides Records (now NoSides Records) in 1998.

=== Bride of No-No ===
Azita formed the Bride of No-No, another project known for extreme theatrics, in 1999. Band members, which included drummers Jen Kienzler, Shannon Morrow and guitarists J. Graf and M.V. Carbon (also of Metalux), disguised themselves onstage in what has been described as mummy-like burkhas. After two albums the band eventually dissolved in 2002.

=== Solo ===
Azita recorded her first solo work, Music for Scattered Brains, to be used as a part of her college thesis project. Music for Scattered Brains was originally released on vinyl in 1995. In 1997, Azita returned to playing her childhood instrument, the piano while rooming with engineer Elliot Dicks who brought a piano into their loft. On piano, she started writing and recording material which would eventually be released under her own name. Enantiodromia was released in 2003 on Drag City, and Life on the Fly followed in 2004. Descriptions of this release varied, from comparisons with Steely Dan to comparisons with "a bad Rod Stewart album from the early 1980s".

Azita's album, How Will You?, was released on February 17, 2009. Her latest album, Glen Echo was issued in March 2021.

== Discography ==
AZ

- Music for Scattered Brains (CD, Atavistic, 1997; LP, SG Research, 1995)

Scissor Girls

- We People Space With Phantoms (LP/CD, Atavistic, 1995)
- Here is the "Is-Not" (CD, Atavistic, 1997)

Bride of No-No

- B.O.N.N. Apetit! (LP/CD, Atavistic, 2000)
- II (LP/CD, Atavistic, 2003)

Azita

- Enantiodromia (LP/CD, Drag City, 2003)
- Life on the Fly (LP/CD, Drag City, 2004)
- Detail From the Mountain Side, music from the Brian Torrey Scott musical (CD EP, Drag City, 2006)
- How Will You? (LP/CD, Drag City, 2009)
- Disturbing the Air (LP/CD, Drag City, 2011)
- Year, music from the Brian Torrey Scott musical (LP/CD, 2012)* Year, music from the Brian Torrey Scott musical (LP/CD, 2012)
- Glen Echo (LP, Drag City, 2021)

== Art ==
- Cover art on To Live and Shave in L.A.'s Ride a Cock Over Horse 7" (Menlo Park Recordings, 1996)
- Artwork for the LP/CD Music for Scattered Brains - AZ
