= Purple on Time =

Studio album by U.S. Maple
- Released: November 4, 2003
- Genre: No wave Alternative rock
- Label: Drag City (U.S.)

U.S. Maple chronology
Acre Thrills (2001)	Purple on Time (2003)

Professional ratings
Review scores
Source	Rating
Allmusic	link
Pitchfork Media	6.6/10 link

Purple on Time is the fifth album by U.S. Maple. It was released on November 4, 2003 on Drag City.

== The Album ==
According to singer Al Johnson, the album's title is meant to elicit connotations of emotion, as, to him, purple is an emotional color. The "on time" aspect of the title is meant to evoke sexual associations related to climax. Al Johnson describes the records as a "love record," and contends that the band intended to make an album of love songs, but their intention went unnoticed.

== Track listing ==
1. "My Lil' Shocker" (U.S. Maple) – 5:07
2. "Sweet & Center" (U.S. Maple) – 4:40
3. "Oh Below" (U.S. Maple) – 4:35
4. "I'm Just a Bag" (U.S. Maple) – 3:16
5. "Dumb in the Wings" (U.S. Maple) – 4:42
6. "Whoopee Invader" (U.S. Maple) – 4:38
7. "Lay Lady Lay" (Dylan) – 5:19
8. "Tan Loves Blue" (U.S. Maple) – 3:16
9. "Untitled" (U.S. Maple) – 0:45
10. "Touch Me Judge" (U.S. Maple) – 3:44

== Credits ==
- Al Johnson – Vocals
- Mark Shippy – Guitar
- Todd Rittmann – Guitar
- Adam Vida – Drums
