= Breaking Laces =

American band

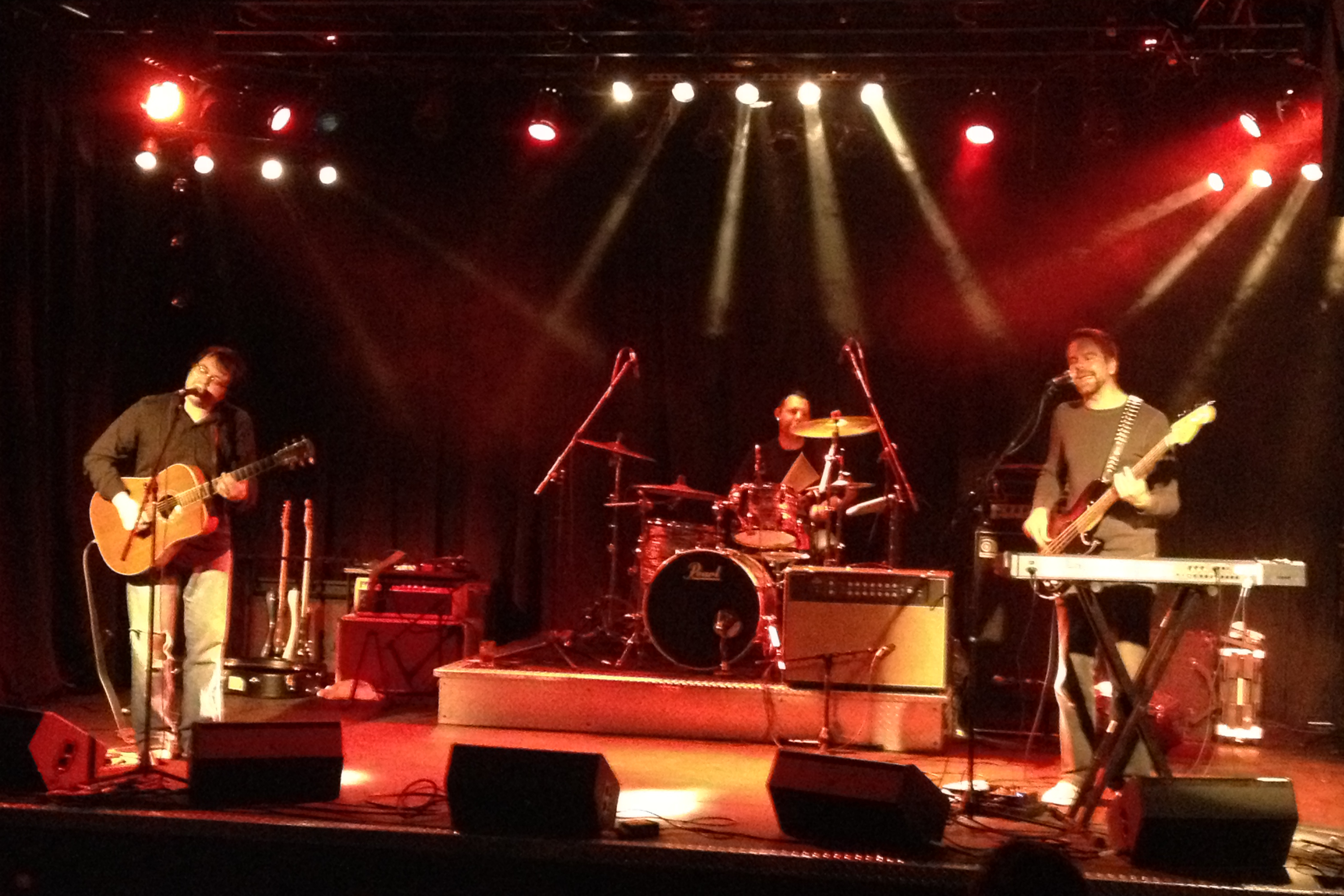
- Breaking Laces performs at The Rutledge in Nashville, Tennessee in June 2012.

Background information
- Origin: Brooklyn, New York, United States
- Genres: Indie rock, pop/rock, alternative rock, indie pop
- Years active: 2003-2013
- Label: Tenacity Records
- Members: Willem Hartong (vocals, guitar); Rob Chojnacki (bass, keyboards, backing vocals); Seth Masarsky (drums, programming, percussion)
- Website: breakinglaces.com

Breaking Laces was an American acoustic-rock band formed in Brooklyn, New York.

The band consisted of Willem "Lambchop" Hartong (lead vocals, guitar, principal lyricist), Roberto Chojnacki (bass, keyboards, backing vocals) and Seth "Pickle Spear" Masarsky (drums, programming, production). Its music has been described as acoustic rock, alternative rock, indie rock and indie pop, and is known for "honest songwriting". Breaking Laces has released five albums and five EPs since its inception in 2003.

== History ==
The band originally began as a basement project by Willem Hartong, who recorded and released a pair of D.I.Y. albums – 2003's Sohcahtoa and its acoustic companion, Operation Income – on his own. Hartong then joined with Seth Masarsky, later adding bassist Rob Chojnacki, with whom Masarsky had played previously in the band Darby Jones. Touring followed, and in 2005 they recorded their first album, Lemonade, together. This album was followed by the six-song 2006 EP Astronomy Is My Life, But I Love You and 2009's full-length Live at Seaside Studios.

Since its inception, the band has played over 2000 shows, including several tours overseas.

In 2011, the band teamed with Nashville-based Tenacity Records and released When You Find Out. They continued to tour and released the album "Come Get Some" in October 2012.

An independent band at heart, they would release free singles and EP's online and give limited CD prints away at shows. They accumulated unreleased original material as well as live recordings that became known as "The Laces Vault" on social media.

The band announced a “probably forever for now hiatus” via Twitter and their website in October 2013.

== Origin of band name ==
According to Hartong, the name Breaking Laces comes from the many times the band had been kicked out of clubs for wearing sneakers.

== Members ==
- Willem Hartong – vocals, guitar
- Rob Chojnacki – bass, keyboards, backing vocals
- Seth Masarsky – drums, programming, percussion, album producer

== Discography ==
- God In Training (EP, 2003)
- Sohcahtoa (2003)
- Operation Income (2003)
- Not From Concentrate (EP, 2005)
- Lemonade (2005)
- Astronomy Is My Life, But I Love You (EP, 2006)
- Live At Seaside (2009)
- What We Need (EP, 2010)
- When You Find Out (2011)
- Come Get Some (October 30, 2012)

== See also ==
- Culture of Brooklyn
- List of alternative-rock artists
- List of bands formed in New York
- List of indie-pop artists
- List of indie-rock musicians
- Music of New York City
