= Destroy All Music =

Studio album by The Flying Luttenbachers
- Released: 1995
- Recorded: December 3, 1993–September 16, 1994 in Chicago, Illinois
- Genre: Noise rock
- Length: 39:19
- Label: ugEXPLODE
- Producer: The Flying Luttenbachers

The Flying Luttenbachers chronology
Constructive Destruction (1994)	Destroy All Music (1995)	Revenge (1996)

Professional ratings
Review scores
Source	Rating
Allmusic	4.5/5 stars
Uncut	3/5 stars

Destroy All Music is the second album by The Flying Luttenbachers, released in 1995 through ugEXPLODE.

== Track listing ==
All tracks are written by Weasel Walter, except "Fist Through Glass", "(In Progress...)" and "The Necessary Impossibility of Determinism" by The Flying Luttenbachers.

Side one
No.	Title	Length
1.	"Demonic Velocities/20,000,000 Volts"	3:49
2.	"Fist Through Glass"	3:27
3.	"Sparrow's Thin Lot"	1:32
4.	"Splürge"	5:26
5.	"(In Progress...)"	3:33

Side two
No.	Title	Length
1.	"Verlag aus den 'Turbo Scratcher'"	5:38
2.	"The Necessary Impossibility of Determinism"	4:46
3.	"Dance of the Lonely Hyenas"	4:33
4.	"Tiamat en Arc"	3:46
5.	"Final Variation on a Theme Entitled "Attack Sequence""	2:49

2007 CD remaster bonus tracks
No.	Title	Length
11.	"One-Two Punch"	3:41
12.	"Improvisation"	2:37
13.	"The Critic Stomp"	3:37
14.	"Clammer + Sprint"	4:55
15.	"Coffeehouse in Flames"	5:43
16.	"Eaten by Sharks"	7:28
17.	"Throwing Bricks"	6:47

== Personnel ==
The Flying Luttenbachers

- Jeb Bishop – bass guitar, trombone, Casio MT-65
- Chad Organ – tenor saxophone, baritone saxophone, Moog synthesizer
- Dylan Posa – guitar
- Weasel Walter – drums
- Ken Vandermark – tenor saxophone, soprano clarinet, bass clarinet

Production and additional personnel

- Elliot Dicks – recording on "Tiamat en Arc"
- Carolyn Faber – photography
- The Flying Luttenbachers – production
- Jim O'Rourke – synthesizer on "Eaten by Sharks"
- Chuck Uchida – recording
