= Garrett Pierce =

American singer-songwriter (born 1981)

Garrett Pierce (born March 17, 1981) is an American singer-songwriter from California. Pierce has released three full-length albums and two EPs (Crossbill Records, Narnack Records).

== Early life ==
Garrett began writing songs on guitar at the age of thirteen and put out several demos while living around Burbank, Glendale and Echo Park in Los Angeles in his youth. At age 22 he moved to Davis, California where he completed his first official recording, the in His Arms EP. Pierce then moved to San Francisco in 2005 where he began to perform at venues such as Bottom of the Hill and the Great American Music Hall and subsequently recorded his first full album, Like a Moth, which featured fellow musicians Jolie Holland and Matt Bauer. Critics favorably compared the songs to other moody wordsmiths such as Mark Kozelek and Will Oldham.

== Later career ==
While touring with respected New York anti-folk artist Diane Cluck, Pierce met and began working with songwriter and instrumentalist Timothy James Wright and soon after recorded Garrett's second album All Masks in Wright's barn and house in the gold rush town of Columbia, California. All Masks featured ten musicians and lush arrangements on several tracks; a departure from the more his more stripped-down freshman album. The album was regarded for its dense lyrically content and mythological themes.

Pierce's third record was recorded in the childhood home of long-time collaborator Eric Ruud (Sholi) in Santa Rosa, California. Originally slated for release on Crossbill Records, who put out Garrett's first two records, the new project City of Sand was picked up and released by Los Angeles-based Narnack Records most known for their work with Thee Oh Sees, The Fall, and Lee "Scratch" Perry. The City of Sand is Pierce's most successful to date with several music videos created for the singles "Everybody Breaks", "Why oh Why" and "Statue Song". Pierce also made videos around this period covering Joy Division's "Twenty-Four Hours" and Seal's "Crazy". His 2011 EP ''Everybody Breaks'' featured some dramatic compositions.

Pierce has just completed his fourth record which is slated for release in 2017.
