= Narnack Records =

Record label

- Founded: 2000
- Founder: Shahin M Ewalt
- Genre: Indie rock, post punk, americana, noise rock, electronic, garage rock, dub, hip hop, art rock
- Country of origin: U.S.
- Location: Los Angeles, California
- Official website: www.narnackrecords.com

Narnack Records is an independent record label founded in 2000. The label developed in New York City's underground music scene and quickly became known for its ability for developing new artists Coachwhips, OCS, Langhorne Slim, Thee Oh sees, ACID, Spiders & Hearts, Higgs, while also working with established bands like the Fall and the Slits, Lee "Scratch" Perry Narnack became home for a diversified group of musicians working with a wide variety of artists, from garage rock, alternative and punk to Americana, folk and dub/reggae.

In the spring of 2007, the company relocated from New York to Los Angeles, where it teamed up with Lionsgate Films for distribution. In its new residence, Narnack began a publishing division, Narnack Music Publishing, with a catalog of over 300 songs from past and present artists as well as composers. After a short stint with Lionsgate, Narnack moved to TVT/The Orchard for both physical and digital distribution.

In 2008, Lee "Scratch" Perry brought Narnack a Grammy nomination for Best Reggae Album with Repentance.

== Current roster ==
- 400 Blows
- Electric Flower Group
- Hypernova
- Iran
- Lee "Scratch" Perry
- Garrett Pierce
- Restavrant
- Sisters
- Sundelles
- Vaz

== Catalog artists ==
- Big A Little a
- Tyondai Braxton
- Bunnybrains
- The Cairo Gang
- Coachwhips
- Condor
- Deerhoof
- DJ Shitbird and the Ultimate Party Machine
- Erase Errata
- The Fall
- Friends Forever
- Friends of Dean Martinez
- Guitar Wolf
- Hella
- Intelligence
- Langhorne Slim
- Lil Pocketknife
- The Oh Sees
- Parts & Labor
- Revenge SF
- Shesus
- Sonic Youth
- The Slits
- Women And Children
- XBXRX
- X27
- Yellow Swans
- Young People

== See also ==
- List of record labels
