= Gods of Chaos =

Studio album by The Flying Luttenbachers
- Released: November 17, 1998
- Recorded: August 19, 1996
- Genre: Noise rock
- Length: 45:44
- Label: Skin Graft

The Flying Luttenbachers chronology
Revenge (1996)	Gods of Chaos (1998)	"...The Truth Is a Fucking Lie..." (1999)

Professional ratings
Review scores
Source	Rating
Allmusic	3/5 stars

Gods of Chaos is the fourth album by The Flying Luttenbachers, released on November 17, 1998 through Skin Graft Records.

== Track listing ==
No.	Title	Length
1.	"The Pointed Stick Variations"	10:38
2.	"Stream of Needles"	10:04
3.	"The Floatation Method"	4:00
4.	"Alien Autopsy"	3:27
5.	"The Sun Is Bleeding"	13:02
6.	"Cryptosporidium"	4:42

== Personnel ==
The Flying Luttenbachers

- Chuck Falzone – guitar, bass guitar, percussion
- Bill Pisarri – bass guitar, violin, clarinet, percussion, cover art
- Weasel Walter – drums, saxophone, vocals, synthesizer, clarinet

Production and additional personnel

- Randy Lancelot – engineering
- The Flying Luttenbachers – engineering
- Colm O'Reilly – cover art
