= Charanams =

US-based world music band

- Origin: New York, New York, United States
- Genre: World music
- Years active: 2010–present
- Members: Nivedita ShivRaj; Marcus Cummins; Tripp Dudley; Jason Goldstein; Naren Budhkar; Sam ShivRaj
- Website: www.charanams.com

Charanams is a world music carnatic jazz band that presents a unique blend of South Indian carnatic music and jazz music. Charanams band presents musical compositions of carnatic musician Nivedita ShivRaj. These music compositions are based on South Indian Carnatic music with jazz improvisations. The compositions do not have any lyrics, but contains carnatic music solfege.

Charanams is based in New York City in the United States.

== History ==
Charanams band was founded in 2010 by Nivedita ShivRaj, a carnatic musician based in New York, who plays veena, a South Indian string instrument and vocal music. Her original music compositions Mystic Earth, Rain Dance and Himalayan Queens were selected for 60x60 music collections in 2008, 2009 and 2011. Charanams band performed music concerts based on these compositions which are based on Indian ragas and traditional carnatic compositions blended with jazz style and contemporary rhythms.

Nivedita ShivRaj is the artistic director of Charanams band and contributes music compositions for the band.

=== 2011: Charanams won New York's Battle of the Boroughs Music Contest ===
Charanams band contested in WNYC Radio's Battle of the Boroughs Music contest in New York City in which over 500 bands compete for the top position. The band, the only Indian music band in the contest, won the music contest for the year and became a noted music band of the city.

Announcing the winner, Terrance McKnight, the host of the contest, said he knew from the band's first audition that they were special. "I think they'll open some hearts and minds at SummerStage," he said.

Since then, Charanams has performed in many events and stages in the USA.

As the winner of the Battle of the Boroughs music contest, Charanams band was invited to perform on November 1, 2011, in New York Mayor's Awards Ceremony for Arts and Culture at Alice Tully Hall (Lincoln Center) in New York. The function was hosted by Mayor Michael Bloomberg and actor Alec Baldwin.

The band was also recognized at New York Central Park SummerStage main concert on July 27, 2011, by performing as the opening act for Wanda Jackson and Imelda May.

== Popular Music of Charanams ==
- Mystic Earth
- Rain Dance: Rain Dance symbolizes human relationship with rain and portrays the joy that the rain showers bring to the world. Rain Dance is on the Indian Raga Amirtha Varshini (the sweet showers).
- Himalayan Queen
- Hudson Ride

== Concerts of Charanams Band ==
Charanams band has performed in many events and stages in the USA. Some notable performances have been listed below.

- July 22, 2011: The Ultimate Concert at WNYC GreeneSpace, New York.
- July 27, 2011: New York Central Park Summer Stage Main Concert.
- April 13 and 14, 2013: New York Botanical Gardens - Music from the World of Orchids.
- November 3, 2013: Queens Public Library - Central Library Auditorium.

== Etc., etc., ==
- The DesiClub of the USA's Top 50 Coolest Desis of 2011 featured Charanams band in 49th place.
