= Godcaster =

American rock band

- Origin: Brooklyn, New York
- Genres: experimental rock indie rock
- Years active: 2018–present
- Label: Ramplocal
- Members: Judson Kolk; Bruce Ebersole; David McFaul; Von Kolk; Ryan West
- Past members: Sam Pickard; Jan Fontana

Godcaster is an American indie rock band from Brooklyn, New York.

== History ==
Godcaster released their debut album, Long Haired Locusts, in 2020. This album garnered the attention of some music publications, who gave the album positive reviews. The group released their second full-length, a self-titled album, in 2023, to further positive reviews.

Godcaster's 2025 single "Judy Living Daylights" was produced by of Montreal frontperson Kevin Barnes and used Barnes' personal studio to record their upcoming 3rd release. This was after being of Montreal's opening act during their 2024 tour.

== Reception ==
Pitchfork reviewer Zach Schonfeld described Godcaster's debut Long Haired Locusts as 'teetering right on the edge of irredeemable obnoxiousness, daring you to resist their charm and lightning-fast musicianship.' For their self-titled effort, Pitchfork reviewer Zhenzhen Yu felt that "the band maintains its characteristic mayhem and mythology while continuing to diversify."'

== Discography ==
=== Albums ===
Title	Details
Long Haired Locusts	Released: 4 September 2020; Formats: Digital download, CD, LP, streaming
Godcaster	Released: 10 March 2023; Formats: Digital download, CD, streaming, LP

=== Extended plays ===
List of EPs, with release date and label shown
Title	Details
Saltergasp	Released: 4 November 2021; Formats: Digital download, CD, LP

=== Singles ===
List of singles, showing year released and album name
Year	Title	Album
2019	"Don't Make Stevie Wonder"	Long Haired Locusts
2019	"She's a Gun"	non-album single
2019	"Christ in Capsule Form"	Long Haired Locusts
2020	"Apparition of the Virgin Mary in My Neighborhood"	Long Haired Locusts
2020	"Serpentine Carcass Crux Birth"	Long Haired Locusts
2021	"Hecky Skelters"	Saltergasp
2022	"Diamond’s Shining Face"	Godcaster
2023	"Pluto Shoots HIs Gaze Into the Sun"	Godcaster
2023	"Vivian Heck"	Godcaster
2023	"Lady Said a Body"	non-album singles
2025	"Judy Living Daylights"	non-album singles

=== Music Videos" ===
- "All the Feral Girls In The Universe" (2020)
- "Diamond's Shining Face (2023)
- "Pluto Shoots His Gaze into the Sun" (2023)
- "Vivian Heck" (2023)
