= Goodbye Picasso =

American rock band

- Origin: New York, New York, USA
- Genres: Alternative rock, alternative country, folk rock, experimental rock, acoustic
- Years active: 2001–present
- Labels: Fresh Danger Records
- Members: Chris Dreyer; Scott Taylor; Tim Lappin; Joe Nero
- Past members: Andrew Altman; Mark Raudabaugh; Ian Hodge; Chris Vidal
- Website: www.goodbyepicasso.com

Goodbye Picasso is an American rock act based in New York, NY. The principal members of Goodbye Picasso are Chris Dreyer and Scott Taylor. They have performed with a variety of rhythm sections since forming as an acoustic duo in 2001. Goodbye Picasso released their first album, The Book of Aylene, in 2006.

In 2015 Goodbye Picasso signed with Fresh Danger Records. The band's sophomore effort, Somewhere Between the Dog and the Wolf, was digitally released on August 18, 2017 and accompanied by a limited edition vinyl record. The album was produced by Abe Seiferth and executive produced by Rob Holland.

Goodbye Picasso's music has always built on the strength of the songs written by Chris Dreyer, lead vocalist and songwriter. Dreyer names The Beatles, Conor Oberst, and Ryan Adams as influences, amongst others.

Goodbye Picasso has received acclaim in New York City after being named Audience Favorite at the Ars Nova A.N.T. Festival in 2008 for their rock opera The Book of Aylene.

== Music Style and Influences ==
Chris Dreyer plays acoustic guitar in the group in addition to being Goodbye Picasso's singer and songwriter. The band's arrangements vary from solo acoustic song settings to full band (adding electric guitar, bass, and drums) with strings, a horn section, and keyboard instruments. Their music does not fit into one genre, which is a quality they share with many jam bands, but Goodbye Picasso's live performances do not generally feature long improvised sections.

The group is influenced by the experimental tendencies of Radiohead and Wilco, but have an accessible quality similar to the music of Damien Rice, Pete Yorn, My Morning Jacket, and Iron and Wine. The music fits in the genres folk, indie, and acoustic rock, and some arrangements could be classified as alt-country.

== History ==
=== Fall 2000 – Spring 2001, London ===
Chris Dreyer traveled to London for the first of 2 semesters abroad. He recorded with London producer Jono Buchanon and shared a flat with fellow songwriter, and The Boxer Rebellion frontman, Nathan Nicholson. Scott Taylor attended The FSU London Study Centre for the Spring semester, 2001. He went to study classical music, but ended up meeting Chris and forging a musical alliance. They recorded together with Jono and played 3 standing room only shows at the famed 12 Bar Club in London's West End.

=== 2002–2005 Tallahassee, FL ===
Chris and Scott began playing shows stateside at college bars and frat parties. By the end of the year, they started their first full band proper, Nectar. As Nectar, they performed at various bars, clubs, and frats, getting their feet wet. They began to play around the state of Florida and played their first shows in Georgia. After various lineup changes and a summer off, they played some of their biggest shows yet, many at FSU to over 1200 people. They began to record their first EP as Whiskey Richard, with new members Andrew Altman and Mark Raudabaugh. Whiskey Richard spent 7 months in the studio off and on recording a full-length album of songs. The band played over 100 shows in 2005.

=== 2006 Nashville, TN ===
The band moved in together in a house in east Nashville. Whiskey Richard went on to play 85 shows in 6 months, a punishing tour schedule. They made 3 trips to the northeast and opened the CMJ Music Marathon on Halloween in New York City. In December, the group split in half. Chris Dreyer and Scott Taylor moved to New York City. Mark Raudabaugh and Andrew Altman became the rhythm section for The Codetalkers.

=== 2007– , New York, NY ===
Chris and Scott regrouped in New York City as Goodbye Picasso. Their first 2 shows as that new entity were a show at The Knitting Factory and a label showcase at Snitch for Universal Music with Ari Hest bassist Rob Calder and Fiction Plane drummer Pete Wilhoit. After becoming regulars at songwriter-haven Rockwood Music Hall on the Lower East Side, the group performed with a few more rhythm sections and added piano and a horn section for some shows at Don Hill's in the West Village.

Goodbye Picasso got a stable lineup with the additions of Tim Lappin on bass and Joe Nero on drums, graduates of the University of the Arts and Manhattan School of Music, respectively. This lineup played the 2008 CMJ Music Marathon in New York City at Rockwood Music Hall. The group played subsequent showcases for major record labels and landed a spot in the Ars Nova Theater's A.N.T. Fest. Their show was named "Audience Favorite" by festival-goers after Goodbye Picasso's sold out performance on November 1, 2008. Goodbye Picasso maintains an active performance schedule and records regularly.

== Discography ==
- The Book of Aylene, 2009 (pre-production)
- The Village EP, 2007
- The Untimely Demise of a Love-struck Confessor, 2005
- House Music, 2003 (out-of-print)
- The London Sessions, 2001
