= Child Abuse (band) =

American noise-rock band

- Origin: Brooklyn, U.S.
- Genres: Noise rock, punk jazz, rock, progressive rock
- Years active: 2004–present
- Labels: Skin Graft Records; Lovepump United Records; Rococo Records; Zum; Folding Cassettes; Rock Is Hell; Forge Records
- Members: Tim Dahl; Oran Canfield; Eric Lau
- Past members: Luke Calzonetti

Child Abuse is a noise rock trio featuring Tim Dahl (bass and vocals), Eric Lau (keyboards and vocals), and Oran Canfield (drums) based out of Brooklyn, New York. Originally formed in 2004 as a duo with keyboardist/singer Luke Calzonetti, and drummer Oran Canfield, the group expanded into a trio with the addition of bassist Tim Dahl in the summer of 2005. In 2011, Luke Calzonetti left the band and was replaced by Eric Lau on keyboards. It was during this lineup change that Dahl added vocals in addition to his role as the bassist. Child Abuse has shared bills with many bands including Suicide, Ruins, Arab on Radar, The Locust, Thee Oh Sees, AIDS Wolf, Liturgy, Rhys Chatham and many more. In 2014 Child Abuse joined the Skin Graft Records label for their third album Trouble in Paradise. This same lineup was used for their fourth and most recent album Imaginary Enemy.

== Sound ==
A review from New York's The Village Voice states, "Child Abuse is a gloriously confrontational band, mixing the incoherent glugs of death metal, the dissonant meander of 12-tone composition, the atonal squonk of free-jazz, blasts of ucky noise, and a wet gob of old-fashioned punk rock."

== Cover art ==
Notable German painter, Albert Oehlen, has provided the cover art for three of the band's studio albums: Child Abuse, Trouble In Paradise, and Imaignary Enemy.

== Discography ==
- Imaginary Enemy - CD/LP Album (Skin Graft, 2019)
- Trouble In Paradise - CD/LP Album (Skin Graft, 2014)
- It's My Time - Cassette EP (Self Released, 2013)
- Hipster Puppies: New York - Compilation Cassette (Hipster Puppies, 2011)
- Cut and Run - CD/LP Album (Lovepump United Records, 2010)
- Untitled - 7" Album Compilation (Rock Is Hell, 2008)
- Child Abuse - CD/LP Album (Lovepump United Records/Rococo Records, 2007)
- Child Abuse/Zs - 7" Split Album (Zum, 2008)
- Child Abuse/Miracle of Birth - CD Split Album (Lovepump United Records, 2006)
- Zum Audio Vol III - CD Compilation (Zum, 2006)
- Octis/Child Abuse - 7" Split Album (Forge Records, 2005)
- Dry Socket Cassette - EP (Folding Cassettes, 2005)
- Eagle Album- (Self Released, 2004)

== Members ==
- Tim Dahl – Bass guitar, lead vocals (2005–present)
- Oran Canfield – Drums (2004–present)
- Eric Lau – Keyboard, vocals (2011–present)

=== Past members ===
- Luke Calzonetti – keyboard/vocals (2004-2011)
