= Tim Dahl =

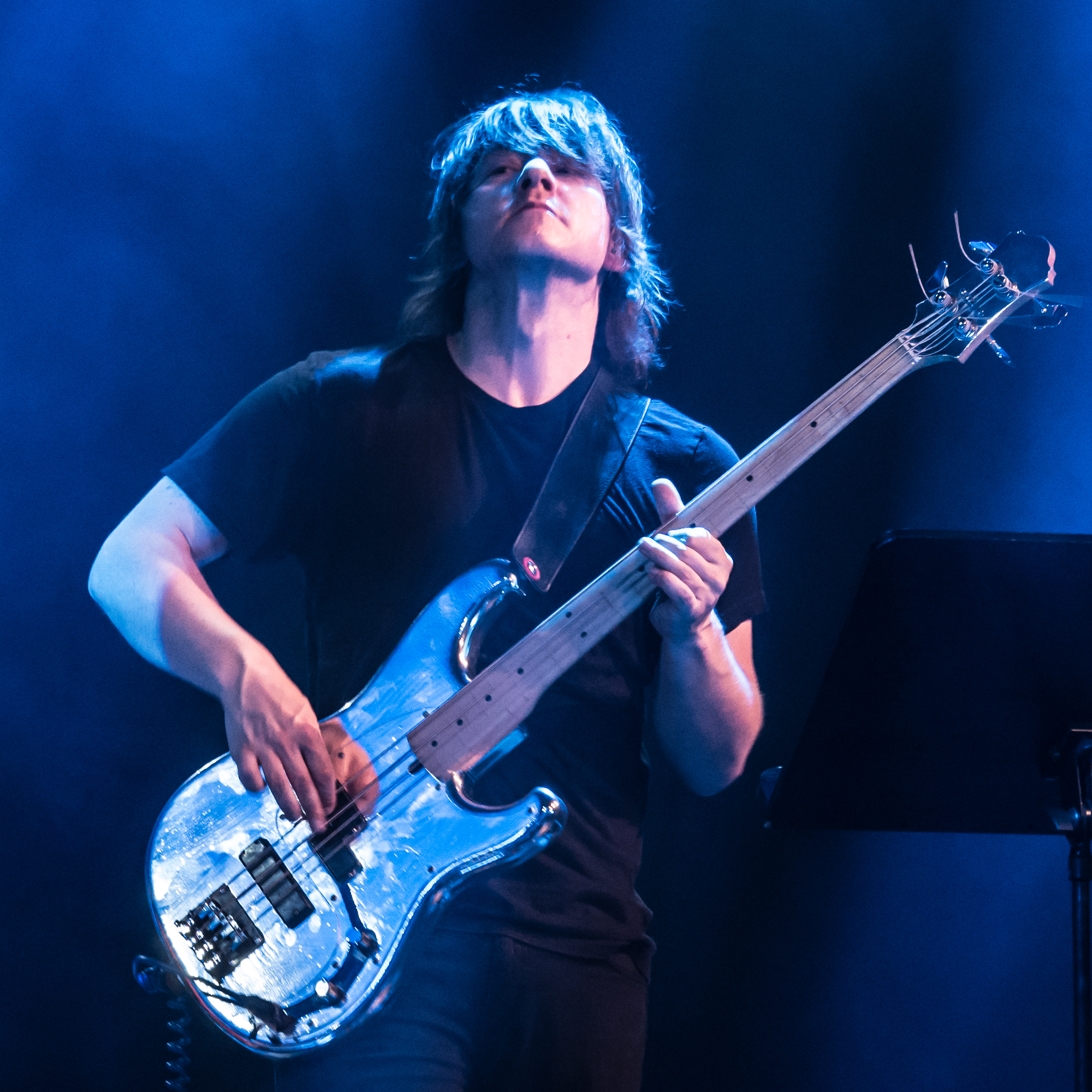
- Tim Dahl performing at the Moers Festival, Germany 2015

Background information
- Born: 1975 (age 50–51)
- Genres: Avant-garde jazz, free jazz, experimental, rock, progressive rock
- Occupation: Musician
- Instrument: Bass
- Years active: 1997–present
- Labels: Lovepump United Records, Tzadik Records, UgEXPLODE Records, Innova Records, Skin Graft
- Member of: Child Abuse, Barrsheadahl, Pulverize the Sound, American Liberty League, Lydia Lunch Retrovirus

Tim Dahl is a professional electric and double bass player, vocalist, keyboardist and composer living in New York City. He is best known as the bass player of the noise-rock band Child Abuse and Lydia Lunch Retrovirus. He also writes and performs for the jazz ensemble Pulverize The Sound.

Dahl has toured extensively throughout North and South America, Europe, Australia, New Zealand and Japan. He has performed with many notable musicians, composers and performers including Yusef Lateef, Archie Shepp, Eugene Chadbourne, Tatsuya Yoshida, Von Freeman, Stanley Jordan, Mary Halvorson, Malcolm Mooney, Marc Ribot, Brian Chase, Hamid Drake, Elliott Sharp, Weasel Walter, Marni Nixon, Peter Evans, Kevin Shea, Mick Barr,Lydia Lunch, Jan Terri, The Bureau of Atomic Tourism, Ava Mendoza, etc.

As a bass player he is notable for unique style and technical savviness. Clifford Allen of Tiny Mixtapes' wrote "Tim Dahl [...] approaches his well-worn axe with a battery of pedals and loops, combining determinate speed with murkier sonics to create a landscape not unlike a harsh, speed-freak variant on Hugh Hopper."

Dahl currently lives in Brooklyn and is an active member in the music scene. He is the co-host of the Lydian Spin podcast with Lydia Lunch.

== Selected discography ==
American Liberty League

- Going to Coney Island - CD (Dick Move Records, 2011)

BarrSheaDahl

- BarrSheaDahl - CD (UgEXPLODE Records, 2012)

Child Abuse

- Imaginary Enemy - CD/LP Album (Skin Graft, 2019)
- Trouble In Paradise - CD/LP Album (Skin Graft, 2014)
- Hipster Puppies: New York - Compilation Cassette (Hipster Puppies, 2011)
- Cut and Run - CD/LP Album (Lovepump United Records, 2010)
- Child Abuse - CD/LP Album (Lovepump United Records, 2007)
- Child Abuse/Zs - 7" Split Album (Zum, 2008)
- Child Abuse/Miracle of Birth - CD Split Album (Lovepump United Records, 2006)
- Zum Audio Vol III - CD Compilation (ZUM, 2006)

Lydia Lunch Retrovirus

- Live in Zurich - CD (Widowspeak, 2016)
- Urge to Kill - LP/CD (Widowspeak, 2015)

Pulverize The Sound

- Sequel - CD (More Is More Records, 2018)
- self titled - CD (Relative Pitch Records, 2014)

Weasel Walter Large Ensemble ft. Henry Kaiser

- Igneity: After the Fall of Civilization - CD (2016)

Nandor Nevai

- D'M'N, Ava Mendoza, Tim Dahl, Nándor Névai - D'M'N - 6xFile, MP3, Album (The PSYKOMANTEUM, 2017)
- Nevai_Nonet-String Oktet in A - LP (2013)

GRID

- Grid - CD/LP (NNA Tapes, 2017)

G.o.V.

- studio recording ep - DVD (2015)

The Gate

- Stench - CD/LP (Smeraldina-Rima, 2014)

Yusef Lateef

- YAL's 10th Anniversary - A Tribute Concert for Yusef Lateef - CD (YAL Records, 2002)

Talibam!

- Boogie in the Breeze - CD (ESP Disk' Ltd., 2009)

Jason Cady

- Happiness is the Problem - CD (Lock Step records, 2013)

Matthew Welch

- Blarvuster - CD (Tzadik Records, 2010)

Barker Trio

- self titled - CD (phantom ear music, 2015)

Andrew Barker/Paul Dunmall/Tim Dahl

- Luddite - CD (2014)

The Hub

- Light Fuse and Get Away - CD (The Hub Artist Group, 2005)
- Live in Gugalander - CD (EMD Records, 2003)
- Trucker - CD (Innova Records, 2002)
- Accident - CD (The Hub Artist Group, 2001)
- Vandalism - CD (The Hub Artist Group, 2000)

The Spinning Wheels Drive Band

- 100% Totally Free Ringtones - CD (Versus Trade, 2011)
