= Miller Miller Miller & Sloan =

American funk/pop band

- Origin: New York City, New York, United States
- Genres: Funk; Rap; Blue-eyed soul Pop
- Years active: 1979–1993
- Labels: Meaningful Records
- Past members: C.B. Miller, Michael Miller, Dan Miller, Blake Sloan

Miller Miller Miller & Sloan was an American funk/Pop band, based in New York City, that reached its zenith in the early 1980s. The band was made up of the three Miller brothers Dan, C.B. "Barney" and Mike, plus and their childhood friend, Blake Sloan. The band opened for The Clash, as well as Tom Tom Club and Chaka Khan, playing prominent venues such as The Ritz and CBGB's.

The band was the subject of the documentary film, Miller Miller Miller & Sloan: We Don't Wanna Make You Dance, by director Lucy Kostelanetz. The movie inspired a new Facebook page for the band which links to their many music videos and other band information.

Miller, Miller, Miller & Sloan appear (as Miller, Miller, Miller & Sloane) in the Jonathan Lethem novel, "Fortress Of Solitude".

Mike Miller, the band's vocalist/percussionist is now a solo artist known as Mr. Shy.

Guitarist Barney Miller went on to a solo career as The Legendary Barney Miller. His music is available on iTunes, Spotify, Tidle, and other music streaming services. He also has a Facebook page.

Dan Miller, the band's rhythm guitarist, later cofounded the Duck Corporation, later On2 Technologies.

Their cousin is Dominic Miller, guitarist for Sting since 1990.
