= 400 Blows (Los Angeles band) =

American punk/metal band

400 Blows is a Los Angeles–based band, formed in 1997, and signed to Gold Standard Laboratories. The group's sound incorporates elements of hardcore punk and heavy metal, and their live shows have been noted for their ferocity. After 3.19.98 in 1999, in 2000 the band released Black Rainbow, and their third LP was 2006's Angel's Trumpets and Devil's Trombones. The band famously designed the iconic "Salvation" sign at Silverlake Lounge.

== Members ==
=== Current members ===
- Skot Alexander – vocals
- Scott Martin – guitar
- Kevin Fitzgerald – drums

=== Former members ===
- Christian Moreno (Wabschall) – guitar
- Ferdinand – drums/Guitar
- Bryce – guitar
- Joseph – drums

== Discography ==
- 3.19.98 (1999), Total Annihilation
- Black Rainbow (Rehash Records, 2003)
- The Sore Thumb EP (Gold Standard Laboratories, 2005)
- Angel's Trumpets and Devil's Trombones (Gold Standard Laboratories, Narnack Records, 2005)
- The Average Guy (Buddyhead Records, 2006)
- Sickness and Health (ORG Music, 2011)
- Golden Grouper Compilation (2004), GSL Records
