= Acre Thrills =

Studio album by U.S. Maple
- Released: October 24, 2001
- Recorded: Pachyderm Studio, Cannon Falls, Minnesota, Fall 2000
- Genres: Avant-garde; Indie rock
- Length: 31:28
- Label: Drag City

U.S. Maple chronology
| Talker (1999) | Acre Thrills (2001) | Purple On Time (2003) |

Acre Thrills is the fourth full-length LP by the Chicago-based experimental rock quartet U.S. Maple. It was released in 2001 by Drag City. The sessions of the album's recording were documented in an accompanying film on YouTube by Tony Ciarrochi.

== Style ==
Spencer Owen, writing for Pitchfork Media, felt that this album "represents a venture into actual melody, at least more so than they've attempted before", likening the result to a "malfunctioning machine that suddenly becomes aware of its existence." Tiny Mixtapes' Tamec explained that the "closest comparison for this music is an arrhythmic Don Caballero with someone moaning and gasping over top of it.". John Fail writing for Fakejazz writes that vocalist Al Johnson has "created another impenetrable mess of words, delivered in a voice that gets raspier with each record."

In the film which documents the recording session, Al Johnson explains his vocal style in terms of diagrams which encircle the lyrics, with black dots representing a 'closed throat' sound (producing a rasp), whereas an unfilled dot would mean the lyric would be more traditionally 'sung'. The rest of the band attempt to explain the process of their songwriting, albeit unsuccessfully.

In an article with Pulse Of The Twin Cities on the supporting tour of Acre Thrills, Johnson was keen to underline the fact that U.S Maple do indeed orchestrate, as opposed to spontaneously improvising, their songs.

I just hope people know that we’re writing songs, that we’re not just up there improvising. That’s not schtick up there. It’s four people communicating.

== Critical reception ==
Professional ratings
Review scores
| Source | Rating |
|---|---|
| Allmusic | 3/5 stars |
| Pitchfork Media | 9.1/10 |
| Fakejazz | 12/12 stars |
| Tiny Mix Tapes | 4.5/5 marks |

Fakejazz gave the record full marks, John Fail commenting "can't think of another band today that is really progressing as much from where Beefheart began 30 years ago." Pitchforkmedia were almost equally fulsome with praise, rewarding the album with a 91% score and the statement that "U.S. Maple have finally reached brilliance with Acre Thrills, a gorgeously dangerous combination of everything they've seemed to strive for that now makes them imperfectly perfect."

David Berman of Silver Jews ranked the record in his top five of 2001.

== Track listing ==
All tracks written by US Maple.

| No. | Title | Length |
|---|---|---|
| 1. | "Ma, Digital" | 3:30 |
| 2. | "Babe" | 2:05 |
| 3. | "Rice Ain't Afraid Of Nothing" | 3:01 |
| 4. | "Untitled" | 2:07 |
| 5. | "Obey Your Concert" | 2:47 |
| 6. | "Total Fruit Warning" | 2:58 |
| 7. | "Open A Rose" | 3:29 |
| 8. | "Make Your Bedroom Great" | 3:09 |
| 9. | "Chang, You're Attractive" | 2:48 |
| 10. | "Troop And Trouble" | 3:18 |
| 11. | "Untitled" | 2.14 |

== Personnel ==
| Name | Role |
|---|---|
| Al Johnson | vocals/lyrics |
| Todd Rittman | guitar |
| Mark Shippy | guitar |
| Pat Samson | drums |
| Brian Paulson | production |
