= Shorty (band) =

American rock band

- Origin: Chicago, Illinois, United States
- Genres: Alternative rock Noise rock Indie rock
- Years active: 1991—1994
- Labels: Worry Bird Records; Bovine Records; Gasoline Boost Records; Skin Graft Records; X-Mist Records
- Past members: Al Johnson; Mark Shippy; Todd Lamparelli; Luke Frantom; Anthony Ciarrochi; Tim Mescher

Shorty was an American rock band formed in Chicago, Illinois in 1991. The band consisted of vocalist Al Johnson, guitarist Mark Shippy, drummer Todd Lamparelli, and bassist Luke Frantom. After the group's breakup, Al Johnson and Mark Shippy would go on to form the underground art rock band U.S. Maple.

== History ==
Officially forming in 1991, Shorty's roots can be traced back to 1986, when vocalist Al Johnson and guitarist Mark Shippy first met through mutual friends. At the time, both were involved in local Illinois rock bands; Johnson in the DeKalb, Illinois, gothic rock band Nursery, and Mark Shippy in the Crystal Lake, Illinois, art rock group, the Muckrakers, consisting of Shippy (known as Harry), Larry Nutley (known as Icky Muck), Tom Nutley (known as Stu), and Eddie Buster (known as Ponaman). In the spring of 1988, Johnson and Shippy decided to join together for an as-yet unnamed project, placing an ad in a local DeKalb newspaper for bandmates to back them up. After a number of responses which went nowhere, the two were approached by Todd Lamparelli and Anthony Ciarocchi, childhood friends and recent castoffs from the Chicago Heights punk rock band Tricot Mesh. Together, the four-piece began playing under an ever-changing assortment of names such as Dragster, and Bomb.

By the fall of 1988, Ciarocchi had quit the band, replaced by new bassist Tim Mescher. By 1989 the band had changed its name again, this time to Snailboy, a term referring to a lethargic racehorse. The band released two singles as Snailboy, the first, Mungo, was released by Tar guitarist John Mohr on his own No Blow record label. During this period, the band was living and recording in a farmhouse owned by one of Lamparelli's co-workers for 50 dollars a month. Life in the farmhouse was rustic to say the least; while residing there the band had to deal with geese and weasels running loose inside the house, Lamparelli's co-worker's naked daughter defecating on the floors, and nests of baby mice infesting their amplifiers.

In August 1990 the band departed for Smart Studios in Madison, Wisconsin, to record their second single, Spoo Heaven, with producer Butch Vig. In April 1991, Spoo Heaven was released by Sympathy for the Record Industry. This period also saw the replacement of bassist Tim Mescher, (who was not getting along with the other band members), with bassist Luke Frantom, who had previously worked with Johnson during his time in Nursery.

The addition of Frantom to the group's lineup resulted in a third and final name change. The band members ultimately adopted and finalized the group's name as Shorty, a moniker which would last until the group's demise. The new name was agreed upon by both Johnson and Shippy, but for different reasons; Shippy approved the name because for him it elicited connotations of the unconventional guitar playing of Guitar Shorty, while Johnson chose to adopt the name because he saw it as a common street name, befitting the group's raw sound. The name change was unofficially adopted by the band in May 1991, and officially became the band's new name in September of that year. Under the name Shorty, the band released a 7” on the Worry Bird label called, “Last One in my Mouth is a Jerk,” and contributed a track to the “On a Clear Day You Can See Byron” compilation. In December 1992 the band released the Steve Albini produced Niggerhat 7” on Bovine Records.

While Shorty was busy writing songs for their first LP, friend of the band John Mohr was touring Europe with Tar, where he was approached by René Herbst, a musician who had heard Shorty's No Blow single and was interested in financing the band's first full-length release. The band accepted Herbst's offer, and with Albini's acting as producer, began laying down tracks at the Chicago Recording Company, eventually following Albini into his home studio to mix the album. The band's first LP, Thumb Days, was released in April 1993 on German label Gasoline Boost Records. Thirty five hundred copies were pressed, all of which sold out prior to the LP's official release. Shorty's sudden international attention caught the eye of Skin Graft Records’ owner Mark Fischer, who released Shorty's Kaput! 7” and arranged American tour dates with Skin Graft artists such as Zeni Geva and the Dazzling Killmen.

Once the band had finished touring America, they began work on songs for their second LP, Fresh Breath, and in April 1994 embarked on their first European tour. Upon their return to America, Frantom, faced with personal business matters that required his full attention, was forced to quit the band. Frantom's departure marked the beginning of the end for the group as a whole; Fresh Breath, the follow-up to Thumb Days, was released in June 1994 as the band was in the first throes of a breakup. Following a further American tour fraught with personnel and technical problems, the band finally folded, playing their last show at the Lounge Ax in July 1994. Johnson and Shippy remained together following Shorty's breakup, and along with guitarist Todd Rittmann and drummer Pat Samson (who replaced Jim Kimball), went on to form the No Wave-influenced U.S. Maple.

Due to Al Johnson moving away from the Chicago area, U.S. Maple seems to be in a temporary hiatus. Mark Shippy has formed two new projects, Miracle Condition and Invisible Things.

== Discography ==
=== Singles ===
- "Last One In My Mouth is a Jerk" 7" (Worry Bird Records, 1991, WOE 012-7)
- "Niggerhat" 7" (Bovine, 1992, BO-06)
- "Kaput" 7" (Skin Graft Records, 1993, GR07)

=== Albums and EPs ===
- Thumb Days LP/CD (Gasoline Boost, 1993, GB 6)
- Fresh Breath EP 10"/CD (Skin Graft Records, 1994, GR14)
