= Local Weatherman =

American band

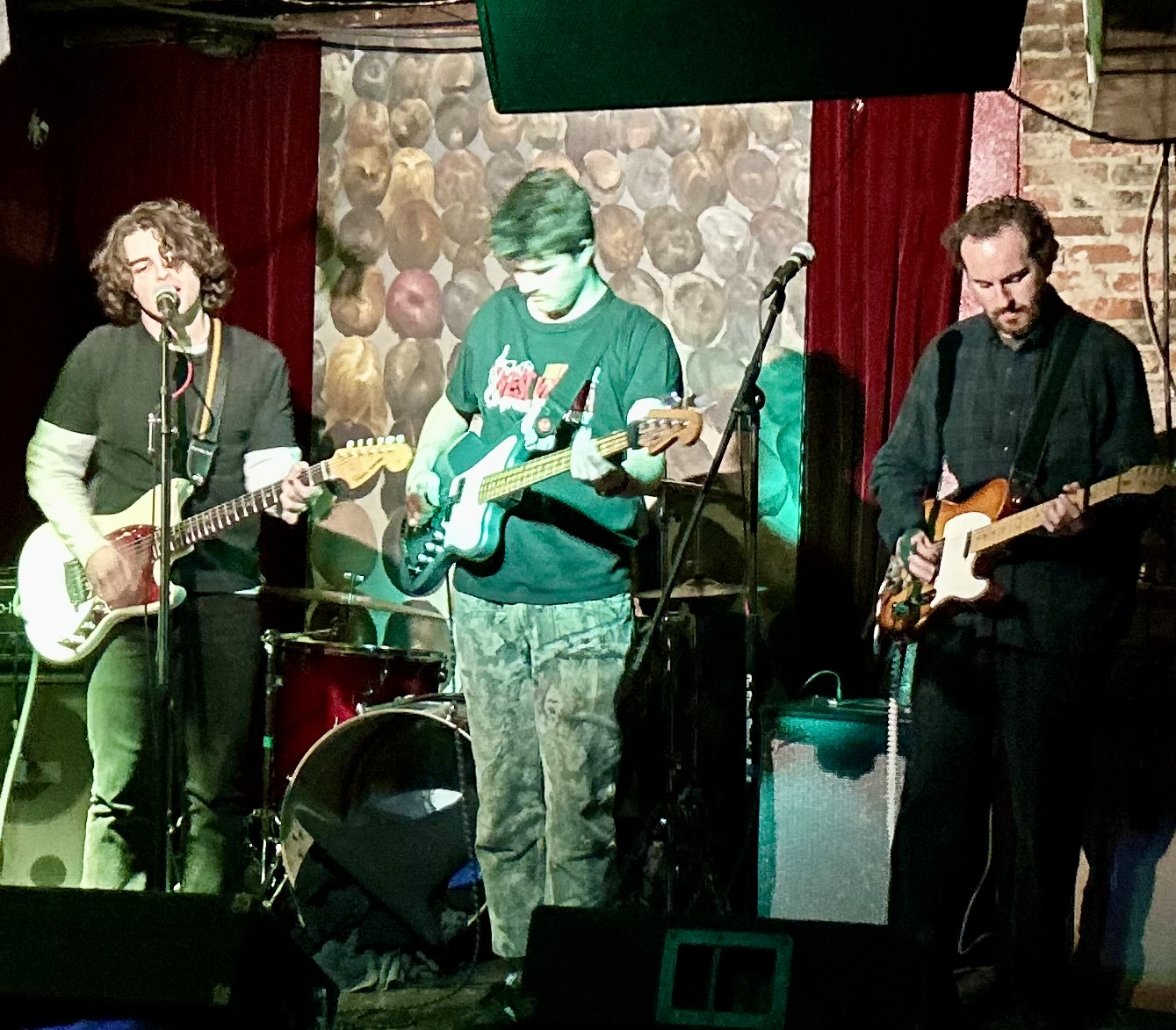
Local Weatherman

Local Weatherman is an American indie music band based in Brooklyn, NY led by singer-songwriter and multi-instrumentalist Fritz Ortman. Formed in 2018, the band blends elements of indie rock, indie folk, power pop, emo, and slacker rock with DIY roots. Local Weatherman has released multiple independent and studio produced recordings and has been continually performing live shows and regularly releasing new music since its founding.

== Origin and History ==
Local Weatherman began as the solo project of Fritz Ortman in 2018, with initial releases self-recorded and distributed through online platforms. The project evolved into a full band with the addition of guitarist Ford Murphy in 2021 followed by bassist David Murray and drummer Sam Shahghasemi. In 2023, the band released their eponymous debut album, recorded at The Metal Shop in Philadelphia in partnership with producers Zack Robbins and Ian Farmer. Following the release, Local Weatherman toured extensively in the U.S. across the East Coast and Midwest, and in Canada. The band continued releasing new music, including the EP Right One (2026), which has been described in the music press as exploring themes of self-doubt and personal growth.

== Musical style and influences ==
Local Weatherman's music is laden with layered guitars, melodic hooks, and introspective lyrics that explore anxiety, self-doubt, identity, and relationships. Their sound seems to be an amalgamation of power pop, emo, slacker rock, punk, college radio and DIY/indie traditions. Reviewers have noted the band's development and evolution toward more structured songwriting and cohesive arrangements on the Right One EP.

== Timeline 2018 - present ==
- 2018 – Fritz Ortman begins releasing music under the name Local Weatherman.
- 2019 – Independent releases continue, expanding the band's online presence.
- 2023 – Self-titled album Local Weatherman is released.
- 2026 – Right One EP is released.

== Lineup ==
- Fritz Ortman – lead vocals, guitar, keyboards
- Ford Murphy – guitar
- David Murray – bass
- Sam Shahghasemi – drums

== Discography ==
=== Studio albums ===
- Local Weatherman (2023)

=== Extended plays ===
- Right One (2026)

=== Other releases ===
- We're Doomed (2019) – early self-released recordings
- Greatest Man Who Ever Lived (2018) – early self-released recordings
- Monster (2018) – early self-released recordings

== Airplay and Press Coverage ==
Local Weatherman and Ortman have been featured in the press with favorable reviews of their music. The Harvard Crimson profiled the band in early 2024, discussing Ortman's background and his development of the Local Weatherman concept. New Noise Magazine praised the Right One EP as an embodiment of the band's evolution toward cohesive, structured songwriting. The Line of Best Fit highlighted the band's introspective lyrics and layered guitar work on the single "Weighing." Sound vs. System described Local Weatherman's blend of indie rock, power pop, and slacker rock, while also noting influences from both emo and college radio. Wildfire Music expounded on the EP's exploration of self-doubt and new beginnings. An Already Heard track guide recommended material from the Right One EP. Alternative Press (magazine) included "Out of the Vein" in its “AP A-sides: Songs you need to hear – January 16, 2026” list.

In February 2026, Local Weatherman first began receiving measurable college radio airplay in North America after the Right One release. Chris Sanley, Music Director for KEXP, described the Right One EP as "supremely catchy." The song "Right One" first appeared on the College Radio Charts in February 2026. The release also appeared on the North American College and Community Radio Chart (NACC) Top 200 summary chart during the same period.
