= U.S. Maple =

American noise rock band

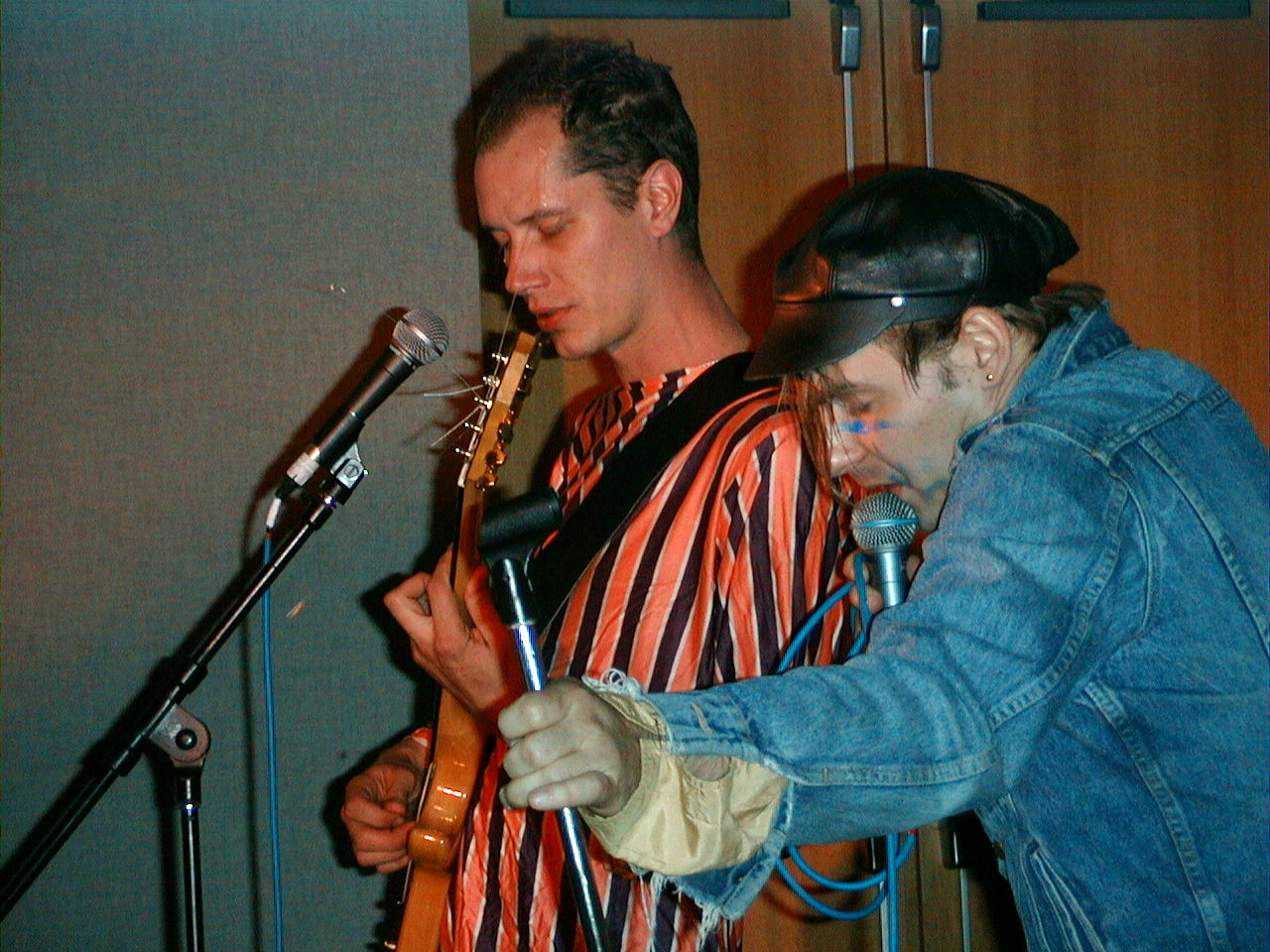
- Todd Rittmann and Al Johnson playing with U.S. Maple in 1999

Background information
- Origin: Chicago, Illinois, U.S.
- Genres: Experimental rock; indie rock; noise rock; math rock; post-hardcore; post-rock
- Years active: 1995–2007
- Labels: Skin Graft; Drag City
- Spinoff of: Shorty; Mercury Players
- Members: Al Johnson; Mark Shippy; Todd Rittman; Adam Vida
- Past members: Pat Samson

U.S. Maple was an American experimental rock band. The group formed in Chicago in 1995, and consisted of Al Johnson (lead singer), Mark Shippy (guitarist), Pat Samson (drummer), and Todd Rittmann (guitarist) before separating in 2007.

== History ==
=== Formation and first single ===
U.S. Maple was formed in 1995 at DeKalb's Northern Illinois University by former members of Shorty and the Mercury Players. Two members from each band met at the corner of Grand and Western Avenues, and as the band later described on their website, began discussing a disdain for indie rock conventions. They took interest in forming a band, and subsequently began rehearsing the same year.

As a band, U.S. Maple inherited vocalist Al Johnson and guitarist Mark Shippy from Shorty, while drummer Pat Samson and second guitarist Todd Rittman were transplants from the Mercury Players. The band's first recording came in the form of a two-song 7" single, Stuck/When A Man Says Ow!, which was produced by Doug Easley and recorded in September 1995 at Easley Studios in Memphis, Tennessee. The independent label Skin Graft Records took an interest in the band and signed them to the label, releasing the single in the fall of 1995. During these sessions a cover version of AC/DC's "Sin City" was also recorded, and was eventually released on Skin Graft's Sides 1-4 7" compilation.

=== Albums on Skin Graft ===
The band recorded their first album, Long Hair in Three Stages, late in 1995 at Illinois' Solid Sound Studios, located in Hoffman Estates. The album was produced by Jim O'Rourke who was core to other leftfield indie bands in Chicago in the 1990s. Despite their disdain for indie rock conventions, the album showed the band engaging contentiously with Rock and roll, mainly via the strong influence of Captain Beefheart. Skin Graft released the album in October 1995 in both vinyl and CD formats; the vinyl pressings included a bonus track and hand-made sheet metal jackets manufactured by the band members themselves. The band then embarked on a six-week, twelve-country European tour in support of their first album. While in England, the band recorded a Peel session for John Peel's BBC Radio 1 show. When the band returned home from their European tour they recorded a second single featuring a cover of the 1961 Dion and the Belmonts hit "The Wanderer", as well as an original composition, "Whoa Complains." In 1997, the band returned to Solid Sound Studios to record their second album, again with producer Jim O'Rourke. This session produced the album Sang Phat Editor, which was released by Skin Graft Records in June 1997.

=== Albums on Drag City ===
In the fall of 1998 U.S. Maple left Skin Graft, signing to Drag City the following year, due in part to the influence of Drag City labelmate Jim O'Rourke, but also due to an agreement by the label to support the band during their busy tour schedule. 1999 saw the band returning to the studio to record the followup to their Skin Graft work. Their third album, Talker, a darker, sparser record than their previous ones, was recorded at B.C. Studio in Brooklyn, New York. The album was recorded by Michael Gira, lead singer and musician of No Wave post-industrial rock band Swans, with Martin Bisi engineering.

In 2001 the band released their fourth album, Acre Thrills. The album was recorded in Cannon Falls, Minnesota, at Pachyderm Studio, and mixed a week later in Richmond, Virginia, at Sound of Music. In the summer of 2001, after the recording of Acre Thrills, drummer Pat Samson left the band, and was replaced by Adam Vida. With Vida, the band released their fifth studio album, 2003's Purple on Time, which saw a departure from the confrontational, fervent, and violent aspects of previous releases. Purple on Time contained more conventional song structures, instrumentation and singing.

== Discography ==
Singles

- "Stuck" / “When A Man Says Ow!” (Skin Graft, 1995)
- "The Wanderer" / "Whoa Complains" (Sonic Bubblegum, 1996)

Albums

- Long Hair in Three Stages (Skin Graft, 1995)
- Sang Phat Editor (Skin Graft, 1997)
- Talker (Drag City, 1999)
- Acre Thrills (Drag City, 2001)
- Purple On Time (Drag City, 2003)

Compilations

- Sides 1-4 (Skin Graft, 1995)

== Related acts ==
Al Johnson and Mark Shippy were both previously in Shorty (1991–1994). Shippy and former U.S. Maple drummer Pat Samson are now in Miracle Condition. Shippy also plays in the two-piece band Invisible Things with Jim Sykes.

Todd Rittmann now leads Chicago-based Dead Rider, in addition to being a member of Drag City band, Singer. He was formerly a guitarist in The Mercury Players and Cheer-Accident.

Johnson made appearances both live and on record with no-wave band Lake of Dracula, (1995–1997) where he was billed simply as "The Manhattanite", alongside members of The Scissor Girls, The Flying Luttenbachers, and Couch.

== References in other media ==
Chicago punk/rock band Alkaline Trio's song, "Goodbye Forever", which appears on the Alkaline Trio's EP I Lied My Face Off features a line: "Remember last April when we saw U.S. Maple? / Somehow the singer showed the Fireside exactly how I feel."

In the film High Fidelity (2000), a number of scenes which take place in the record store display a U.S. Maple poster attached to the front of the counter. Frontman Al Johnson cameos in the film as an obsessive collector who is repeatedly turned away from buying a particularly rare record (the French import of Safe as Milk by Captain Beefheart & His Magic Band).

Additionally, their early 2000s live performances were, as said by Zach Hill on an interview, of inspiration for the specifically complex songwriting of the song "Hacker" for Death Grips.
