= The Flying Luttenbachers =

American instrumental music group

- Origin: Chicago, Illinois, U.S.
- Genres: No wave; noise rock; death metal; hardcore punk; punk jazz; free jazz; brutal prog
- Years active: 1991–2007; 2017–present
- Labels: Skin Graft Records; Troubleman Unlimited; ugEXPLODE Records
- Members: Weasel Walter; Luke Polipnick; James Paul Nadien
- Past members: Hal Russell; Chad Organ; Ken Vandermark; Jeb Bishop; Dylan Posa; Chuck Falzone; William Pisarri; Aaron Dilloway; Kurt Johnson; Michael Colligan; Julie Pomerleau; Fred Lonberg-Holm; Alex Perkolup; Jonathan Hischke; Ed Rodriguez; Mike Green; Mick Barr; Rob Pumpelly; Tony Dryer; Chris Welcome; Evan Lipson; Brandon Seabrook; Henry Kaiser; Wendy Eisenburg; Tim Dahl; Mattie Nelson; Alex Ward; Katie Battistoni; Sam Ospovat; Charlie Werber
- Website: www.theflyingluttenbachers.com

The Flying Luttenbachers are an American instrumental noise rock band led by multi-instrumentalist, composer and producer Weasel Walter. The band's mix of styles such as punk, death metal, free jazz, and no wave inspired the "brutal prog" genre in the early 2000s.

== History ==
The Flying Luttenbachers formed in December 1991 in Chicago, Illinois, as a punk jazz trio, with Hal Russell (tenor and soprano saxes, trumpet, vibraphone, and drums; co founder), Chad Organ (tenor sax, moog synthesizer, and baritone sax) and Weasel Walter (drums, guitar, bass, keyboards, woodwinds, electronics, and main composer). The band derived their moniker from Russell's birth name, Harold Luttenbacher. Russell left the band in June 1992, and was soon replaced by Ken Vandermark for the recording of The Flying Luttenbachers' first 7″ record.

Since its formation, the band's personnel have changed several times under Walter's leadership. The band has featured several free jazz and experimental rock musicians including Fred Lonberg-Holm, Kurt Johnson, Jeb Bishop, Alex Perkolup, Mick Barr, Ed Rodriguez, Mike Green, and Jonathan Hischke. The Flying Luttenbachers have toured Europe and the US extensively with bands including The Locust, Arab On Radar, Lightning Bolt, U.S. Maple, Erase Errata, Bobby Conn, and Wolf Eyes.

Walter moved from Chicago to Oakland, California, in 2003, and then again to the San Francisco Bay Area. He refreshed The Flying Luttenbachers with the addition of bassist Mike Green, guitarist Ed Rodrigues and later Mick Barr. The band played their final concert in November 2006 before officially disbanding in November 2007 with the release of a studio album (recorded solo by Walter).

In 2017, after a 10-year hiatus, The Flying Luttenbachers reformed, accepting an invitation to play at the Sonic Protest festival. Walter (on drums) was joined by guitarist Chris Welcome and bassist Tim Dahl. The group opened three shows for Oh Sees in October 2018 before touring Europe in April 2019.

In 2019, a quartet version of the band released Shattered Dimension. Joining Walter (on drums) was saxophonist Matt Nelson, bassist Tim Dahl, and guitarist Brandon Seabrook. Over the next few years, the band's varying lineup included bassist Evan Lipson; guitarists Henry Kaiser, Wendy Eisenberg, Katie Battistoni, and Alex Ward; and drummer Sam Ospovat.

== Conceptual continuity ==
Since 1996’s Revenge album, the Flying Luttenbachers’ musical output has been underlined by a gradually unravelling storyline concerning the self-obliteration of the planet Earth and the resulting aftermath. The 2006 album Cataclysm concerns an interstellar battle between two monolithic entities: The Void (a dark, silent spectre detailed in 2004’s album of the same name) and The Iridescent Behemoth (a massive planetoid being whose tale was told in 2003’s complex Systems Emerge from Complete Disorder album). The music energetically utilizes deliberate harmonic dissonance and the material operates on a principle of intelligent transformation of concise amounts of interrelated themes.

== Members ==
Current Members

- Weasel Walter - drums, guitar, bass, keyboards, woodwinds, electronics, main composer (1991-2007, 2017–present)
- Luke Polipnick - bass guitar (2023–present)
- James Paul Nadien - drums (2024–present)

Former Members

- Hal Russell - tenor and soprano saxes, trumpet, vibraphone, drums, co-founder (1991-1992)
- Chad Organ - tenor sax, moog synthesizer, baritone sax (1992-1994)
- Ken Vandermark - tenor sax, Bb and bass clarinets (1992-1994)
- Jeb Bishop - bass, Casio keyboard, trombone (1993-1994, 2022)
- Dylan Posa - guitar, Casio keyboard (1993-1994, 1998)
- Chuck Falzone - guitar, bass (1995-1998)
- William Pisarri - bass, Bb clarinet, vocals, etc. (1995-1998)
- Aaron Dilloway - drums (1997)
- Kurt Johnson - bass, contrabass (1998-2000)
- Michael Colligan - tenor sax, Bb and alto clarinets, etc. (1998-2000)
- Julie Pomerleau - violin (1998)
- Fred Lonberg-Holm - cello (1998-2000)
- Alex Perkolup - bass (2001-2002, 2022)
- Jonathan Hischke - bass (2001-2002)
- Ed Rodriguez - guitar, bass (2003-2006)
- Mike Green - bass (2003-2005, 2006)
- Mick Barr - guitar, bass (2005)
- Rob Pumpelly - guitar, bass (2006)
- Tony Dryer - bass (2006)
- Chris Welcome - guitar (2017)
- Evan Lipson - bass (2018)
- Brandon Seabrook - guitar (2018-2019)
- Henry Kaiser - guitar (2007, 2019)
- Wendy Eisenburg - guitar (2019)
- Tim Dahl - bass (2017-2021)
- Matt Nelson - tenor sax (2018-2021)
- Alex Ward - guitar (2019)
- Katie Battistoni - guitar (2019-2021)
- Sam Ospovat - drums (2020-2021)
- Charlie Werber - drums (2022-2024)

== Discography ==
=== Singles ===
- "546 Seconds Of Noise" (1992)
- "1389 Seconds Of Noise" (1993)

=== Albums ===
- Live at WNUR 2-6-92 (1992)
- Constructive Destruction (1994)
- Destroy All Music (1995)
- Revenge (1996)
- Live in the Middle East (1996)
- Gods of Chaos (1998)
- Retrospektiw III (1998)
- "...The Truth Is a Fucking Lie..." (1999)
- Alptraum (2000)
- Trauma (2001)
- Infection and Decline (2002)
- Retrospektiw IV (2002)
- Systems Emerge from Complete Disorder (2003)
- The Void (2004)
- Spectral Warrior Mythos Volume 1 (2005)
- Cataclysm (2006)
- Incarceration by Abstraction (2007)
- Shattered Dimension (2019)
- Imminent Death (2019)
- Negative Infinity (2021)
- Terror Iridescence (2022)
- Spectral Warrior Mythos 2 (2024)
- Losing The War Inside Our Heads (2024)

=== Compilations ===
- Camp Skingraft 33 Hits! Now Wave Volumes 1-3 (1997)
- Hayfever EP No. 4 (1997)
- Knormalities (1998)
- Troubleman Mix-Tape (2001)
- Troubleman 2003 Sampler (2003)
