= Weasel Walter =

American drummer (born 1972)

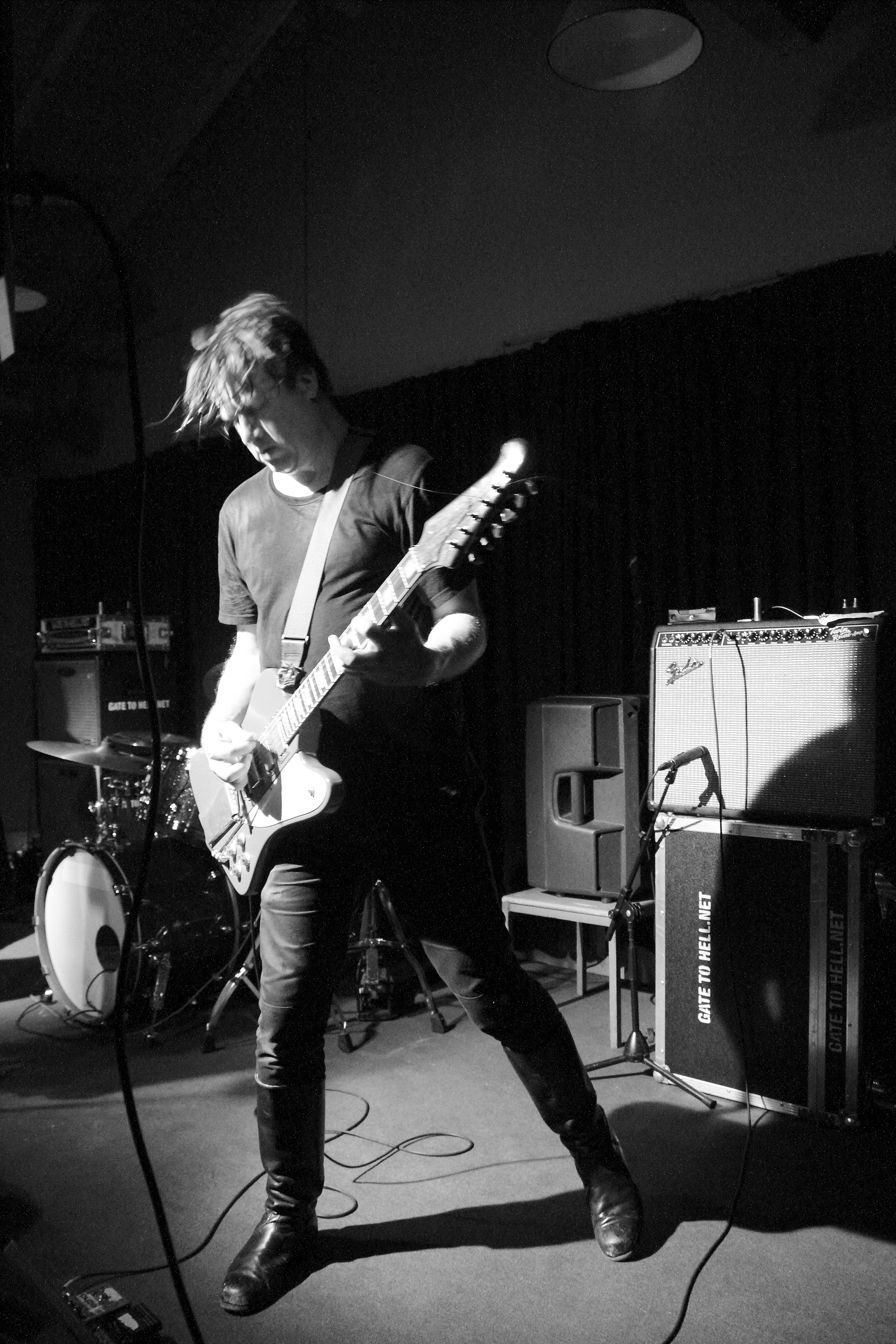
- Weasel Walter at Club W71 in 2017

Background information
- Born: Christopher Todd Walter; May 18, 1972 (age 54); Rockford, Illinois, U.S.
- Genres: Avant-garde, experimental, free jazz, no wave, death metal, technical death metal, progressive metal, Avant-garde metal, noise, noise rock, brutal prog, new music, punk jazz, hardcore punk, free improvisation
- Occupations: Composer, multi-instrumentalist, producer, record label owner
- Instruments: Guitar, bass guitar, drums, double bass, clarinet, saxophone, trombone, trumpet, keyboards, electronics, vocals
- Years active: 1991–present
- Labels: ugEXPLODE, Thirsty Ear, Skin Graft
- Member of: The Flying Luttenbachers; Cellular Chaos
- Formerly of: XBXRX; Lake of Dracula; Behold... The Arctopus; Lydia Lunch Retrovirus
- Website: weaselwalter.com

Weasel Walter (born Christopher Todd Walter, May 18, 1972) is an American composer, improviser, multi-instrumentalist, producer, and founder of ugEXPLODE Records. Walter's work has been informed by techniques and traditions of music including Avant-garde, experimental, no wave, free jazz, extreme metal, punk jazz, hardcore punk, noise, new music and free improvisation. He coined the term "brutal prog" to describe the aggressively dissonant strain of prog played by groups like his band the Flying Luttenbachers.

Known as an unrelenting and abrasive provocateur whose performances trend toward overblown antics and "nihilistic glee", Walter has been described by guitarist Mary Halvorson as "completely manic and extraordinarily sensitive" and by The Chicago Reader as "a splinter lodged beneath the fingernail". Avant-garde artist Glenn Branca once called him "one of the greatest rock composers who ever lived".

He has performed as leader and sideperson in a number of bands, including Cellular Chaos and Lydia Lunch Retrovirus. Walter has worked with Roscoe Mitchell, Marshall Allen, John Butcher, Tim Dahl, Peter Evans, Mary Halvorson, Henry Kaiser, Jim O'Rourke, Evan Parker, Elliott Sharp, Ken Vandermark, and William Winant, as well as in bands including XBXRX, Bobby Conn, Cock E.S.P., Curse of the Birthmark, Erase Errata, Harry Pussy, Lair of the Minotaur, The Chicago Sound and others. He has produced albums by AIDS Wolf, Arab on Radar, Glenn Branca, Burmese, Lydia Lunch, Coachwhips, and Total Shutdown.

== Career ==
In 1990, Walter moved to Chicago to work with free jazz composer Hal Russell (born Harold Luttenbacher) at Columbia College. The following year, Russell joined Walter in co-founding the band the Flying Luttenbachers; saxophonist Chad Organ played in the early trio lineup. Russell left the band in the summer of 1992, and shortly after Ken Vandermark took his place for the recording of the band's first 7".

Walter was highly involved in cultivating what he deemed the "Chicago No Wave" scene, meeting new musicians and collaborators through the Luttenbachers' art rock-continuum gigs and the experimental improvised music series he ran at Myopic Books. He graduated from Columbia College in 1995, with a final project, "Un-nerve", performed by a nonet including Ken Vandermark, Gene Coleman, Jim Baker, Kevin Drumm, Jeb Bishop, and Gustavo Leone.

A prolific performing and recording artist, Walter was a founding member of projects including Miss High Heel (with Jim O'Rourke and Azita of The Scissor Girls), Lake of Dracula (with Marlon Magas and Heather M. of the Scissor Girls), To Live and Shave in L.A. 2, 7000 Dying Rats, and Hatewave.

Walter moved to the San Francisco Bay Area in 2003, where he reformed The Flying Luttenbachers with the addition of bassist Mike Green, guitarist Ed Rodriguez, and later Mick Barr. The Flying Luttenbachers officially disbanded in 2007.

In late 2009, Walter announced that he was moving to New York City to join Behold... The Arctopus as the band's second drummer. He played on Horrorscension, released in 2012, and in two tours before leaving the band in 2013. Walter continued finding new collaborators and formed a number of groups in New York, among them Cellular Chaos, a band with Marc Edwards, Admiral Grey, and Ceci Moss.

In 2017, after a ten-year hiatus, the Flying Luttenbachers played several shows in France, with a new trio lineup of Walter, on drums, joined by bass guitarist Tim Dahl and guitarist Chris Welcome. In 2019, a quartet arrangement of the band released Shattered Dimension, with Walter and Dahl joined by saxophonist Matt Nelson and guitarist Brandon Seabrook. Over the next several years, the varying lineup also included bassist Evan Lipson, guitarist Henry Kaiser, guitarist Wendy Eisenberg, guitarist Katie Battistoni, guitarist Alex Ward, and drummer Sam Ospovat.

== Discography ==
=== As solo artist ===
- Revolt Music (ugEXPLODE, 2006)
- Early Recordings 1988–1991 (Savage Land, 2007)
- Firestorm (ugEXPLODE, 2007)
- Large Group Performances 2007-2009 (ugEXPLODE, 2009)
- Apocalyptik Paranoia (Gaffer, 2009)
- Invasion (ugEXPLODE, 2010)
- Ominous Telepathic Mayhem (ugEXPLODE, 2011)
- Improvised Music Sampler (2014)
- End Of An Error (2014)
- Fragments (2015)
- Half-Death (2015)
- Tribute To 'B' and 'C' List Musicians From The Early Years Of MTV, And G.G. Allin (2015)
- For Andrew Ortmann (2015)
- Seriously: Fuck The Entire World (2015)
- Igneity: After The Fall Of Civilization (2016)
- Curses (2016)
- She's So 60 Minutes of Heavy (2016)
- The Inevitable (Tombed Visions, 2016)
- Expensive Taste (Kitty Play, 2016)
- Skhiizm (ugEXPLODE, 2018)
- The Best of the Worst (ugEXPLODE, 2020)
- Action/Time/Vision - 8 Drum Solos (ugEXPLODE, 2025)

=== As band member ===
with Behold... The Arctopus

- Horrorscension (Black Market Activities, 2012)

with Burmese

- Colony Collapse Disorder (Rock Is Hell, 2009)
- Lun Yurn (ugEXPLODE/Rock is Hell, 2011)

with Cellular Chaos

- Demo Live 5.12.11 (ugEXPLODE, 2011)
- Cellular Chaos EP (ugEXPLODE, 2012)
- Cellular Chaos (ugEXPLODE, 2013)
- Diamond Teeth Clenched (Skin Graft, 2016)
- Dirty Girl (ugEXPLODE, 2018)

with Encenathrakh

- Respekt The Demo (Rectomorph/Dense(s)/Lindung, 2013)
- Encenathrakh (P2/Dense(s), 2015)
- The 2 Song Promo 19 (P2/Lindung, 2019)
- Live Album (P2, 2020)
- Thraakethraaeate Thraithraake (P2, 2020)
- Studio Album (P2, 2021)

with The Flying Luttenbachers

- Live at WNUR 2-6-92 (ugEXPLODE, 1992)
- Constructive Destruction (ugEXPLODE, 1994)
- Destroy All Music (ugEXPLODE, 1995)
- Revenge of the Flying Luttenbachers (Skin Graft, 1996)
- Gods of Chaos (Skin Graft, 1998)
- Retrospektiw III (ugEXPLODE, 1998)
- "...The Truth Is a Fucking Lie..." (ugEXPLODE/Skin Graft, 1999)
- Alptraum (ugEXPLODE, 2000)
- Trauma (ugEXPLODE, 2001)
- Infection and Decline (Troubleman Unlimited, 2002)
- Retrospektiw IV (ugEXPLODE, 2002)
- Systems Emerge from Complete Disorder (Troubleman/ugEXPLODE, 2003)
- The Void (Troubleman/ugEXPLODE, 2004)
- Spectral Warrior Mythos (ugEXPLODE, 2005)
- Cataclysm (ugEXPLODE, 2006)
- Incarceration by Abstraction (ugEXPLODE, 2007)
- Destroy All Music Revisited (Skin Graft, 2007)
- Shattered Dimension (ugEXPLODE, 2019)
- Imminent Death (ugEXPLODE, 2019)
- Negative Infinity (ugEXPLODE, 2021)
- Terror Iridescence (ugEXPLODE, 2022)
- Spectral Warrior Mythos 2 (ugEXPLODE, 2024)
- Losing The War Inside Our Heads (ugEXPLODE, 2024)

with Hatewave

- Demo 1997 (1997)
- Hatewave (Up Jumps The Devil/Tumult, 1998)

with Lake Of Dracula

- Lake Of Dracula (Skin Graft, 1997)
- Four Teachers / Violators 7" (Kill Rock Stars, 1998)
- Skeletal Remains (Savage Land/Roccoco Records, 2006)

with Lydia Lunch

- Retrovirus (ugEXPLODE, 2013)
- 3x3 EP (2015)
- Urge To Kill (Rustblade/Widowspeak, 2015)
- Live In Zurich (Widowspeak, 2016)
- Brutal Measures (Widowspeak, 2016)

with XBXRX

- Sixth in Sixes (Polyvinyl, 2005)
- Wars (Polyvinyl, 2007)
- Sounds (Important Records, 2007)
- Un Usper (self-released, 2009)

=== Collaborations ===
with Sheik Anorak & Mario Rechtern

- The Forbidden Beat (Gaffer, 2010
- Bass Bass Bass Bass (Gaffer, 2010)

with Josh Berman & Aram Shelton

- Last Distractions (Singlespeed, 2009)

with Jeb Bishop & Alex Ward

- Flayed (ugEXPLODE, 2019)

with David Buddin

- Quodlibet (2015)

with John Butcher & Damon Smith

- Catastrophe of Minimalism (Balance Point Acoustics, 2017)

with Charity Chan, Peter Evans, & Tom Blancarte

- Cryptocrystalline (ugEXPLODE, 2013)

with Chad M. Clark

- Incantation Sublimation (ugEXPLODE, 2024)

with Nels Cline, Henry Kaiser, Jim Thomas, & Allen Whitman

- Jazz Free (There Records/A Train, 2012)

with Seth Andrew Davis, Alex Cunningham, & Damon Smith

- Branches Choke (Storm Cellar/Mother Brain Records, 2023)

with Kevin Drumm & Fred Lonberg-Holm

- Eruption (Grob, 2004)

with Marc Edwards / Weasel Walter Group

- Mysteries Beneath The Planet (ugEXPLODE, 2009)
- Blood Of The Earth (ugEXPLODE, 2010)
- Solar Emission (ugEXPLODE, 2011)

with Martin Escalante

- Lacerate (ugEXPLODE, 2018)

with Martin Escalante & Teté Leguia

- Katyusha (ugEXPLODE, 2022)

with Peter Evans

- Poisonous (ugEXPLODE, 2018)

with Peter Evans, James Fei, & Damon Smith

- Eponymous (ugEXPLODE, 2008)

Peter Evans / Weasel Walter Group

- Oculus Ex Abyssus (ugEXPLODE, 2008)

with Sandy Ewen

- Idiomatic (ugEXPLODE, 2018)
- The Paradox of Tolerance (2021)

with Sandy Ewen & Damon Smith

- Sandy Ewen / Damon Smith / Weasel Walter (ugEXPLODE, 2012)
- Live In Texas (Balance Point Acoustics, 2016)
- Untitled ug 79 (ugEXPLODE, 2020)

with Rick Eye & Adios From Everywhere

- Endless Punishment (ugEXPLODE, 2024)

with Den Svarta Fanan (Nonoko Yoshida, Ron Anderson, Joe Merolla, Walter)

- Den Svarta Fanan (ugEXPLODE, 2013)

with Maria Faust & Tim Dahl

- Farm Fresh (Gotta Let It Out, 2019)

with Paul Flaherty

- Particles (2009)

with Paul Flaherty, C. Spencer Yeh, & Steve Swell

- Dragonfly Breath (Not Two, 2013)
- Dragonfly Breath III: Live At The Stone: Megaloprepus Caerulatus (Not Two, 2016)

with Michael Forbes & Andrew Scott Young

- American Free (ugEXPLODE, 2009)
- Hard Living (ugEXPLODE, 2021)

with Michael Foster, Steve Swell, & Brandon Lopez

- Throes are the Only Trouble (2017)

with Gianni Gebbia & Damon Smith

- Lichens (ugEXPLODE, 2007)

with Vinny Golia & Max Johnson

- No Refunds (Unbroken Sounds, 2023)

with Vinny Golia & Damon Smith

- Großes Messer (ugEXPLODE, 2009)

with Forbes Graham, Greg Kelley, & Paul Flaherty

- End of the Trail (ugEXPLODE, 2008)

with Mary Halvorson

- Opulence (ugEXPLODE, 2008)

with Mary Halvorson & Peter Evans

- Mystery Meat (ugEXPLODE, 2009)
- Electric Fruit (Thirsty Ear, 2011)
- Mechanical Malfunction (Thirsty Ear, 2012)

with JeJaWeDa (Jeb Bishop, Jaap Blonk, Walter, & Damon Smith)

- Pioneer Works vol. 1 (Balance Point Acoustics, 2019)
- Pioneer Works vol. 2 (Balance Point Acoustics, 2019)

with Henry Kaiser & Charles K. Noyes

- Ninja Star Danger Rock (There Records/ugEXPLODE, 2011)

with Henry Kaiser, Paul Plimley, & Lukas Ligeti

- The Starbreak Splatterlight (There Records, 2012)

with Henry Kaiser & Damon Smith

- Plane Crash (ugEXPLODE, 2009)
- Plane Crash Two (New Atlantis, 2015)

with Henry Kaiser, Damon Smith, Vinny Golia, & Ra-Kalam Bob Moses

- Astral Plane Crash (Balance Point Acoustics, 2018)

with Yoni Kretzmer & Pascal Niggenkemper

- ProtestMusic (Outnow Recordings, 2014)

with Dominic Lash & Alex Ward

- Trapeze (spoonhunt, 2015)

with Matteo Liberatore & Elliott Sharp

- L'Ora Del Pasto (2020)

with Jacob Lindsay, Ava Mendoza, & Damon Smith

- Jus (Balance Point Acoustics, 2008)

with Fred Lonberg-Holm & Jim O'Rourke

- Tribute to Masayuki Takayanagi (ugEXPLODE, 2000)

with Dominika Michalowska & Michael Foster

- In the Absence of Compromise (Imploding Sounds, 2022)

with Kenny Millions & Damon Smith

- Fuck Music... Tell Jokes - You'll Make More Money (Unhinged, 2018)

with Roscoe Mitchell, Sandy Ewen, & Damon Smith

- A Railroad Spike Forms The Voice (ugEXPLODE, 2021)

with No Mor Musik (Nandor Nevai, Walter, Keshavan Maslak)

- No Mor Musik (ugEXPLODE, 2010)

with Phonon (Elliott Sharp, Álvaro Domene, Colin Marston, Walter)

- Alloy (ZOaR, 2020)

with Chris Pitsiokos

- Unplanned Obsolescence (ugEXPLODE, 2012)
- Drawn and Quartered (One Hand, 2015)
- Cauterized (ugEXPLODE, 2025)

with Chris Pitsiokos & Ron Anderson

- Maximalism (Eleatic, 2013)

with Elliott Sharp & Tim Dahl

- Kompromat (ugEXPLODE, 2022)

with Sam Weinberg & Henry Fraser

- Walter/Weinberg/Fraser / Maestro Day split (Renfusa, 2017)
- Grist (ugEXPLODE, 2020)

with Sam Weinberg & Teté Leguia

- Weinberg/Leguía/Walter (Buh Records, 2018)

with Sam Weinberg & Sandy Ewen

- Ventricles (Renfusa, 2020)

with Nate Wooley, Damon Smith, & Scott R. Looney

- Scowl (ugEXPLODE, 2011)

with Eric Zinman & Mario Rechtern

- Mermaids and Sirens Know (Studio 234, 2021)
