= Cymbals discography =

- Studio albums: 4
- EPs: 1
- Live albums: 1
- Compilation albums: 3
- Singles: 10

Cymbals was a Japanese pop rock band formed in Shibuya, Japan. The band was led by Reiji Okii, and included vocalist Asako Toki, and drummer Hiroyasu Yano, while past members include Miyako Yoneyama (Citrobal). The band was active between 1997 until 2004.

== Albums ==
=== Studio albums ===
List of studio albums, with selected details and chart positions
| Title | Album details | Peak chart positions |
| Title | Album details | Oricon |
|---|---|---|
| That's Entertainment | Released: January 21, 2000; Label: Victor; Format: CD, LP | 45 |
| Mr. Noone Special | Released: September 21, 2000; Label: Victor; Format: CD, LP | 44 |
| Sine | Released: July 3, 2002; Label: Victor; Format: CD | 48 |
| Love You | Released: May 21, 2003; Label: Victor; Format: CD, LP, digital download | — |
"—" denotes albums that did not chart. "×" denotes periods where charts did not exist.

=== Mini albums ===
List of mini albums, with selected details
| Title | Album details |
|---|---|
| Neat, or Cymbal! | Released: June 3, 1998; Label: Living, Dining & Kitchen; Format: CD |
| Missile & Chocolate | Released: December 15, 1998; Label: Living, Dining & Kitchen; Format: CD |

=== Live albums ===
List of live albums, with selected details
| Title | Album details |
|---|---|
| Requests! | Released: September 3, 2003; Label: Victor; Format: CD |

== Extended plays ==
List of extended plays, with selected details
| Title | EP details |
|---|---|
| Higher than the Sun | Released: August 22, 2001; Label: Victor; Format: CD |

== Compilations ==
List of compilations, with selected details
| Title | Album details |
|---|---|
| Respects | Released: March 23, 2001; Label: Victor; Format: CD, LP |
| Well-done | Released: November 21, 2001; Label: Victor; Format: CD, LP |
| Anthology | Released: December 25, 2003; Label: Victor; Format: CD, digital download |

== Singles ==
List of singles as lead artist, showing year released and album name
| Title | Year | Album |
|---|---|---|
| "I'm A Believer" | 1998 | Neat, or Cymbal! |
| "Winter Day Song" | 1998 | Missile & Chocolate |
| "What A Shiny Day" | 1999 | That's Entertainment |
| "Escape Plan at 8 AM" | 1999 | Non-album single |
| "RALLY" | 1999 | That's Entertainment |
| "My Brave Face" | 1999 | That's Entertainment |
| "Do You Believe In Magic?" | 2000 | Mr. Noone Special |
| "Highway Star, Speed Star" | 2000 | Mr. Noone Special |
| "Wingspan" | 2002 | Sine |
| "Love Thing" | 2002 | Love You |
