= List of math rock groups =

This is a list of math rock groups:

== # ==
- 31Knots
- 65daysofstatic
- 90 Day Men

== A ==
- Acidman
- Adebisi Shank
- Agent Fresco
- Ahleuchatistas
- Algernon Cadwallader
- Alpha Male Tea Party
- American Football
- aMiniature
- And So I Watch You From Afar
- Angine de Poitrine
- Arcane Roots
- Autoclave
- Autolux

== B ==
- Battles
- Bats
- Because of Ghosts
- Bellini
- Blacklisters
- Black Midi
- Black Pus
- Blakfish
- Blind Idiot God
- Bob Tilton
- Botch
- Braid
- Breadwinner
- By the End of Tonight

== C ==
- The Cancer Conspiracy
- Canvas Solaris
- Cardiacs
- The Cast of Cheers
- Chavez
- Cheer-Accident
- Chinese Football
- Chochukmo
- Chon
- Circus Lupus
- Circus Mircus
- Colossal
- Colossamite
- Converge
- Cotoba
- Covet
- Crain
- Craw
- Crom-Tech
- The Crownhate Ruin

== D ==
- Dads
- Damiera
- Dance Club Massacre
- Dance Gavin Dance
- Daughters
- Dazzling Killmen
- DD/MM/YYYY
- Death and the Penguin
- Delta Sleep
- Dianogah
- The Dillinger Escape Plan
- The Dismemberment Plan
- Don Caballero
- Drive Like Jehu
- Dutch Uncles

== E ==
- The Edmund Fitzgerald
- El Ten Eleven
- Elephant Gym
- Empire! Empire! (I Was a Lonely Estate)
- Enablers
- The End
- Enemies
- Everyoned
- Everything Everything
- Extra Life

== F ==
- The Fall of Troy
- Fang Island
- Faraquet
- Fear Before
- Fiasco
- Foals
- The Forms
- ¡Forward, Russia!
- Foxing
- The Fucking Champs

== G ==
- Gulfer
- Gatsby's American Dream
- Gastr Del Sol
- Ghosts and Vodka
- El Grupo Nuevo de Omar Rodriguez Lopez

== H ==
- Hail the Sun
- Heavy Vegetable
- Hella
- Zach Hill
- Hot Club de Paris

== I ==
- Icarus the Owl
- If Lucy Fell
- Irk

== J ==
- Joan of Arc
- Johnny Foreigner
- June of 44
- JYOCHO

== K ==
- Keelhaul
- kimono
- King Crimson

== L ==
- Les Savy Fav
- Ling Tosite Sigure
- Lite
- Little Tybee
- Look Mexico
- The Locust

== M ==
- Macseal
- Make Believe
- Maps & Atlases
- Marmozets
- Marnie Stern
- The Mars Volta
- Maserati
- Maybeshewill
- Meet Me In St Louis
- The Mercury Program
- A Minor Forest
- Minus the Bear
- My Disco

== N ==
- Nekropsi
- Nomeansno
- The Number Twelve Looks Like You

== O ==
- Oceansize
- Orthrelm
- Owls
- OXES
- Origami Angel

== P ==
- P.E.E.
- Pattern Is Movement
- Paul Newman
- Pele
- Piglet
- Pinback
- PVT
- Polvo
- Pretend
- Protest the Hero
- Public Relations Exercise
- Polyphia

== Q ==
- Q and Not U

== R ==
- The Redneck Manifesto
- Regulator Watts
- Rhythm of Black Lines
- Roadside Monument
- Rodan
- Rolo Tomassi

== S ==
- Shake Ray Turbine
- Sharks Keep Moving
- Shellac
- Shiner
- Shipping News
- Shorty
- Sleeping People
- Sleepytime Gorilla Museum
- Slint
- The Smile
- Snowing
- So Many Dynamos
- Speaking Canaries
- Steve Albini
- Storm & Stress
- Strelitzia
- Sweep the Leg Johnny

== T ==
- Tabula Rasa
- Tera Melos
- That Fucking Tank
- These Arms Are Snakes
- Thingy
- TTNG (This Town Needs Guns)
- Three Trapped Tigers
- The Brave Little Abacus
- Time of Orchids
- Tiny Moving Parts
- Toe
- Tom's Story
- Tommy Alto
- Tricot
- Tubelord
- Turing Machine

== U ==
- U.S. Maple
- Ui
- Unwound
- Upsilon Acrux
- Uzeda

== V ==
- Vessels
- Viet Cong

== W ==
- We Are the Music Makers
- We Be the Echo
- We Versus The Shark

== Y ==
- Yona-Kit
- Yowie
- Yourcodenameis:Milo
- Youthmovies
- Yukon

== Z ==
- Zazen Boys
- Zeus!
- Zu

== See also ==
- List of mathcore bands
