= List of mathcore bands =

Mathcore is a dissonant style of music characterized by rhythmic complexity and tempo changes (such as those found in free jazz and math rock) with the aggressiveness of hardcore punk and extreme metal. The genre is sometimes considered a subgenre of metalcore. Notable mathcore bands are listed here in alphabetical order.

== List ==
Name	Country	Formed	Ref.
The Algorithm	France	2009	
American Standards	United States	2011	
Antigama	Poland	2000	
Arcane Roots	United Kingdom	2006	
Architect	United States	2004	
Architects (early)	United Kingdom	2004	
The Armed	United States	2009	
Arsonists Get All the Girls	United States	2005	
Beecher	United Kingdom	2001	
Benea Reach	Norway	2003	
Between the Buried and Me	United States	2000	
The Bled	United States	2001	
Blood Has Been Shed	United States	1997	
Botch	United States	1993	
Burnt by the Sun	United States	1999	
The Callous Daoboys	United States	2016	
Cable	United States	1994	
Car Bomb	United States	2002	
Cave In	United States	1995	
The Chariot	United States	2003	
Classically Handsome Brutes	United Kingdom	2012	
Coalesce	United States	1994	
Code Orange	United States	2008	
The Color of Violence	United States	2001	
Converge	United States	1990	
Dance Club Massacre	United States	2004	
Daughters (early)	United States	2001	
Deadguy	United States	1994	
Design the Skyline	United States	2007	
The Dillinger Escape Plan	United States	1997	
Drowningman	United States	1995	
Employed to Serve	United Kingdom	2011	
The End	Canada	1999	
Eso-Charis	United States	1995	
The Esoteric	United States	1996	
Every Time I Die (early)	United States	1998	
Exotic Animal Petting Zoo	United States	2004	
Eyes Upon Separation	United States	1998	
The Fall of Troy	United States	2002	
Fellsilent	United Kingdom	2003	
From a Second Story Window	United States	1999	
Frontierer	Scotland & United States	2011	
Gaza	United States	2004	
Genghis Tron	United States	2004	
The Handshake Murders	United States	2000	
Heavy Heavy Low Low	United States	2004	
Heck	United Kingdom	2009	
The Human Abstract	United States	2004	
Into the Moat	United States	2001	
Ion Dissonance	Canada	2001	
Irk	United Kingdom	2013	
Iwrestledabearonce	United States	2007	
Jesuit	United States	1995	
Keelhaul	United States	1997	
Knut	Switzerland	1994	
Lethargy	United States	1992	
The Locust	United States	1994	
Look What I Did	United States	2001	
Lye by Mistake	United States	2004	
Narrows	United States	2008	
The National Acrobat	United States	1998	
Nora	United States	1996	
Norma Jean	United States	1997	
The Number Twelve Looks Like You	United States	2002	
The Ongoing Concept	United States	2009	
Paria (early)	United States	2001	
Press to Meco	United Kingdom	2011	
Protest the Hero	Canada	2001	
Psychofagist	Italy	2002	
Psyopus	United States	2002	
Pupil Slicer	United Kingdom	2016	
Pyrrhon	United States	2008	
Rolo Tomassi	United Kingdom	2005	
Rorschach	United States	1989	
See You Next Tuesday	United States	2004	
SeeYouSpaceCowboy	United States	2016	
SikTh	United Kingdom	1999	
Some Girls	United States	2002	
The Tony Danza Tapdance Extravaganza	United States	2004	
Tower of Rome	United States	2002	
Vein.fm	United States	2013	
War from a Harlots Mouth	Germany	2005	

== See also ==
- List of deathcore bands
- List of grindcore bands
- List of hardcore punk bands
- List of math rock bands
- List of metalcore bands
