= OvO (band) =

Italian noise rock band

- Origin: Ravenna, Italy
- Genres: Noise rock, sludge metal
- Years active: 2001–present
- Labels: Load, DioDrone, Supernatural Cat, Bar La Muerte
- Members: Stefania Pedretti, Bruno Dorella
- Website: ovolive.blogspot.it

OvO is an Italian noise rock duo formed by Stefania Pedretti and Bruno Dorella in 2000 in Ravenna, Italy. The two initially planned for the band to be totally improvisation-based with an open lineup. After encouragement from members of their local music scene to become a band and tour, they decided to do so in order to play with Cock ESP, an extreme noise band from Minneapolis. Since, the pair have released eight full-length albums on a variety of international record labels including Load Records, Dio Drone, Bar La Muerte, and Supernatural Cat, among others. The origin of the band's name, OvO, stems from using a piece of the Italian word "nuovo", or new, which creates a palindrome. Decibel Magazine summarizes OvO's 2016 album, Creatura, as "making rhythmic, layered, sludgy noise" and a "David Lynch dance party". The duo has toured extensively across the world, playing over 1000 shows in varied locations including Europe, Asia, North America, and Mexico.

== Musical style ==
Counting Swans and Diamanda Galás as their biggest influences, Pedretti and Dorella are known for primitive industrial sounds and Pedretti's theatrically dark vocals. The band is set up in minimalist fashion, with only two members, one of whom plays a half drum kit. Stereogum's Doug Moore described the band's sound as, "music – rhythmic noise, really – that simmers with a flat-affect malice, owing equal debts to extreme metal, noise rock, industrial music, and dark electronica, " while Christian Eede of The Quietus recalled their music as being "punctuated by slamming, swampy drums, squalls of feedback and punchy guitar riffs, as well as Stefania Pedretti's no-holds-barred vocal." OvO has also been compared to Joe Preston's solo project, Thrones, for its "equally ambitious exploration of heaviness beyond metal's sundry genres". Throughout their seventeen years (and counting) of touring, the band has played with an eclectic array of artists including Thurston Moore, A Hawk and a Hacksaw, Zu, Bastard Noise, Jim O'Rourke, The Murder Junkies, Lightning Bolt, Sleepytime Gorilla Museum, Estradasphere, Ludicra, and KK Null. Gear used is varied, including Stefania's utilization of Death By Audio distortion pedals and Digitech Digital Reverb, while Bruno noted the recent purchase of a Roland SPD-S drum pad as a staple of their evolved sound.

== Members ==
- Bruno Dorella – drums, (2000–present)
- Stefania Pedretti – vocals, guitar (2000–present)

== Discography ==
ALBUMS:

- 2001 – Assassine(CD, Bar La Muerte)
- 2002 – Vae Victis (CD, Bar La Muerte)
- 2004 – Cicatrici (CD, Bar La Muerte/Ebria US Edition Radon/Sunship)
- 2006 – Miastenia (CD/LP, Load)
- 2008 – Crocevia (CD/LP, Load)
- 2011 – Cor Cordium (CD/LP, Supernatural Cat)
- 2013 – Abisso (CD/LP, Supernatural Cat)
- 2016 – Creatura (CD/LP/tape, Dio Drone)
- 2020 - Miasma (CD/LP, Artoffact Records)
- 2022 - Ignoto (CD/LP, Artoffact Records)
- 2025 - Gemma (CD/LP/digital, Artoffact Records)

SINGLES:

- 2003 – OvO / Hermit (split CD, Where Late the Birds Sang)
- 2004 – OvO / KK Null (split CD 3", Bar La Muerte / Sunship)
- 2004 – OvO/Tremor (split 7-inch, Cold Caffeine Addict)
- 2004 – OvO/Sikhara (split Mini CD, Lovers and Lollipops)
- 2005 – OvO/With Love (split 7-inch, Luna Records)
- 2006 – OvO/Cock ESP (split 7-inch, Little Mafia)
- 2006 – OvO/Smut (split 7-inch, Ecstatic Yod)
- 2006 – OvO/Mr. Natural (split 7-inch, GK)
- 2007 – OvO/Der Bekannte Post Industrielle Trompeter (split Mini CD, PREcordings)
- 2007 – OvO/Sinistri (split 10-inch, Wallace Records)
- 2009 – OvO/Claudio Rocchetti (split 7-inch, Wallace Records / Holiday)
- 2014 – Averno/Oblio (12-inch picture, CorpoC)
- 2015 – OvO/Cagna Schiumante (split 7-inch, Bloody Sound)

COLLABORATION ALBUMS:

- 2002 – My First Cowboy (CD Split with Rollerball, Bar La Muerte/TMR)
- 2007 – A Bullet Sounds The Same (In Every Language) split with Inferno and Psychofagist (CD, Donnabavosa/Bar La Muerte / Shove)
- 2008 – OvO Rmxd by Daniele Brusaschetto (Blossoming Noise)
- 2008 – OvO/To/Children Egoism – 3 way split (CD, PMK)
- 2008 – OvO/Children Egoism – split (cd, PMK)
- 2009 – The Life And Death of A Wasp – collaboration with Nadja (CD, Bis Aufs Messer/Adagio830)

LIVE ALBUMS:

- Live at CPA, Firenze
- 2006 – Live in Ljubljana, Radio Student, collaboration with Bill Horist (Friends and Relatives)
- Beer Party, Live in Portland, split with Glamorous Pat (CD, Nillacat)

TAPES:

- 2004 Live in Amerika (Imvated)
- 2015 Abisso / Genesi (No-Fi)
- 2016 Crisalide Fossile collaboration with Raven Chacon (Bronson)
