= Stover (surname) =

Stover is a surname, and may refer to:

- Anthony Stover (born 1990), American basketball player
- Brent Stover (fl. from 2010), American sportscaster
- Byron A. Stover (1890–1984), American businessman and politician
- Cade Stover (born 2000), American football player
- Charles Stover (1866–1927), American football player and coach
- Charles B. Stover (1861–1929), American social activist
- Clara Stover (1882–1975), American businesswoman and chocolatier, wife of Russell Stover
- D. C. Stover (1839–1908), American industrialist
- Daniel Stover (1826–1864), American farmer and guerrilla in Tennessee
- David Stover (politician) (born 1954), American politician
- David Stover (racing driver) (born 1979), American racing driver
- Don Stover (1928–1996), American Bluegrass musician
- Elgie Stover (1938–2011), American songwriter and composer
- Elias S. Stover (1836–1927), American politician
- Eric Stover (fl. from 1977), American human rights activist
- Holly Stover (born 1960), American politician
- Ida Elizabeth Stover (1862–1946), American pacifist
- Jeff Stover (born 1958), American football player
- John Hubler Stover (1833–1889), American politician
- Juno Stover-Irwin (1928–2011), American diver
- Kenneth Stover (1948–2010), American singer-songwriter
- Kenneth Spencer Stover (fl. 1919–1923), Canadian politician from Ontario
- Laren Stover (fl. 1994–2004), American writer
- Leon Stover (1929–2006), American anthropologist
- Leroy Stover (1933–2023), American police officer
- Mary Johnson Stover (1832–1883), American political hostess
- Matt Stover (born 1968), American football player
- Matthew Stover (born 1962), American genre writer
- Patrick J. Stover (born 1964), American nutritionist
- Ralph Stover (1760–1811), American politician and judge
- Richard Stover (born 1962), American businessman and engineer
- R. H. Stover (1926–2003), Canadian-Honduran phytopathologist
- Russell Stover (1888–1954), American businessman
- Scott Stover (fl. from 1990), French-American American nonprofit executive
- Stewart Stover (1938–2024), American gridiron football player
- Susan Stover (fl. from 1976), American veterinarian and academic

== See also ==
- Johann Friedrich Stöver (1899–1981), German SS officer and camp commander
- Uwe Stöver (born 1967), German footballer and coac
- Stove (surname)
