= Hear You =

Studio album by Toe
- Released: July 24, 2015
- Genre: Math rock; post rock
- Length: 39:27
- Label: MachuPicchu Industrias

Toe chronology
For Long Tomorrow (2009)	Hear You (2015)	Now I See the Light (2024)

Hear You is the third studio album by Japanese math rock band toe. It was released in Asia through White Noise Records, Hong Kong on July 22, 2015 and worldwide through Topshelf Records on July 24, 2015. The album marks a shift toward a more minimal, vocally-focused sound for the band, and it received generally positive critical acclaim.

== Critical reception ==
Professional ratings
Review scores
Source	Rating
Alt Dialogue	8.5/10
Exclaim!	8/10

Julia Gunst from Exclaim comments on the "swift, complex beats" of Takashi's drums, also noting a more minimal sound than in previous toe's records, and a diverse range of vocals styles. She concludes saying that "[w]hile Hear You is a departure from toe's past work, the consistent and cohesive quality of the album is a marvel of fluidity and control." Michael Negron from Inyourspeakers comments that, while the drums take a central role as in the other band records, there is more diversity in Hear You, specially in the vocals, calling the album "an absolutely brilliant work that is as diverse as it is captivating". He praises the way that the band explore different ideas and give each instrument their due protagonism, and he goes on to say "Toe don't need to prove that they've mastered their craft; they did that long ago."

Joseph James of Will Not Fade praises the drumming, saying "At times drummer Kashikura [Takashi] hangs back, waiting. But when the time comes his playing is urgent and hurried, adding pace and filling the emptiness in a tasteful way". He also praises the cohesive and engaging sound throughout the album, and concludes saying "Hear You may be short, but it's so good that you'll likely find yourself listening to it on repeat anyway." Alt Dialogue's review of the album commends the intricate drumming and guitar work, saying "toe are rightly revered in many circles and Hear You will only further cement their place as one of the most influential math rock / post rock bands around"

== Track listing ==
No.	Title	Length
1.	"Premonition (Beginning of a Desert of Human)"	2:05
2.	"A Desert of Human"	3:17
3.	"Commit Ballad"	4:06
4.	"The World According To"	3:26
5.	"My Little Wish"	3:59
6.	"Song Silly"	5:02
7.	"Boyo"	4:17
8.	"Time Goes"	1:41
9.	"オトトタイミングキミト"	3:29
10.	"G.O.O.D L.U.C.K"	3:23
11.	"Because I Hear You"	4:42
Total length:		39:27
