= Stove (disambiguation) =

A stove is an appliance that heats or cooks or both, in particular:

- Kitchen stove
- Wood-burning stove

Stove may also refer to:

== People with the surname ==
- Stove (surname)

== People with the nickname ==
- Stove King (Steven William King, born 1974), English musician

== Music ==
- "Stove", by Gen Hoshino from Episode
- Stove (album), album by Lana Del Rey

== Games ==
- STOVE Store, video game distribution service by Smilegate.
