= Freedom Bondage =

Studio album by Zeni Geva
- Released: August 29, 1995
- Recorded: June 1995 at Black Box studio in France
- Length: 38:32
- Label: Alternative Tentacles
- Producer: Steve Albini, Zeni Geva

Zeni Geva chronology
Trance Europe Experience (1994)	Freedom Bondage (1995)	10,000 Light Years (2001)

Professional ratings
Review scores
Source	Rating
Allmusic	4.5/5 stars
The Austin Chronicle	1.5/5 stars

Freedom Bondage is an album by Zeni Geva released in August 1995 via Alternative Tentacles.

== Track listing ==
1. "Alienation" – 1:34
2. "Alienation pt. 2" – 1:11
3. "Death Blows" – 3:23
4. "Burn Your Flesh Out" – 3:47
5. "Disorganization" – 3:14
6. "Hate Trader/Interzona" – 6:02
7. "Shi No Umi (Sea of Death)" – 4:07
8. "Freedom Bondage" – 4:19
9. "Ground Zero" – 10:58

== Personnel ==
- Kazuyuki K. Null – vocals, electric guitar, keyboards, percussion
- Mitsuru Tabata – acoustic guitar, electric guitars
- Eito Noro – drums, percussion
