= Kings of the Sun (band) =

Australian hard rock band

- Also known as: The Young Lions; the Rich and Famous; Clifford Hoad's Kings of the Sun
- Origin: Sydney, Australia
- Genres: Hard rock; pub rock; southern rock; rock and roll; punk rock; pop rock
- Years active: 1986–1998; 2001–2009; 2010–present
- Labels: Mushroom; RCA; independent
- Members: Clifford Hoad
- Past members: Jeffrey Hoad; Anthony Ragg; Rowie Riot; Shar Roxxon; Laurie Marlow; Quentin Elliot; Dave Talon; Baron von Berg; Darren Marlow; Glenn Morris; Chris Lewis; Dean Turner; Brad Spurr; Ron Thiessen; Tommy "Gun" Poulter; John McKinnon; Marlon Holden
- Website: kingsofthesunband.com

Kings of the Sun (also abbreviated KOTS) are an Australian hard rock band, which were formed by brothers Clifford and Jeffrey Hoad in 1986. They released three studio albums, Kings of the Sun (1988), Full Frontal Attack (1990) and Resurrection (1993), before disbanding in 2001. The Hoad brothers formed a related hard rock band, the Rich and Famous, in 2002. This group also issued three studio albums, The Rich and Famous (2004), Like a Superstar (2006) and Stand Back... Prepare to Be Amazed! (2007), and broke up in 2009. Thereafter the brothers were estranged and no longer worked together. In 2010 elder brother Clifford formed Clifford Hoad's Kings of the Sun, which has issued three albums, Rock Til Ya Die (2013), Razed on Rock (2016) and Playin' to the Heavens (2017). Jeffrey resumed the Rich and Famous band in the mid-2010s, which became inactive by the end of that decade.

== Career ==
=== 1982–1985: The Young Lions ===
The Young Lions were formed in 1982 by guitarist Bob Spencer (ex-Finch, Skyhooks) with Clifford Hoad on drums, his younger brother Jeffrey on lead vocals and guitar and bass guitarist Marlon Holden. Tim Lumsdaine joined on bass after Marlon left in 1983. Spencer had earlier met Clifford in Brisbane when assembling a drum kit. Clifford asked Jeffrey to relocate with him from Gold Coast to Melbourne to join Spencer's band. In early 1986 Spencer left the Young Lions to join hard rockers the Angels and the Hoads relocated to Sydney.

=== 1986–1998: Kings of the Sun ===
The Hoad brothers formed Kings of the Sun in Sydney with Anthony Ragg on bass guitar (ex-Ballistics) and Ron Thiessen on guitar (ex-Uncanny X-Men). The name references Yul Brynner's 1963 feature film of the same name. In 1986 the Kings of the Sun were formed in Sydney as a pop rock quartet and briefly signed to Mushroom. Their debut single, "Bottom of My Heart", was released in October, which reached the top 50 on the Kent Music Report singles chart. Kings of the Sun were signed to RCA when executive Simon Lowe saw them perform. The group toured the United States during 1987. In New York City they worked on their first album, without Thiessen.

In October 1988 they released their debut studio album, Kings of the Sun, which was produced by Eddie Kramer and mixed by Dave Thoener. Australian musicologist Ian McFarlane praised it as a "no-frills, hard rock album with a raw feel for pop economy". Its lead single "Serpentine" (July), peaked at number 48 in Australia. After the album was released Glenn Morris joined on lead guitar as they toured the US supporting Joe Satriani and then Europe supporting Kiss. They returned to Australia in late 1988.

They opened for Guns N' Roses on the Australian leg of their Appetite for Destruction Tour in December. However, Kings of the Sun were removed from that tour when Jeffrey "dropped his pants in front of the audience" at their Sydney show and expressed his opinion on Guns N' Roses. Tensions had developed between the two groups due to Clifford's remark in the local On the Street magazine: he claimed Guns N' Roses took much of their image from Rose Tattoo. Clifford recalled in July 2012, "When I said those things, I meant them. It wasn't necessarily aimed at Guns N' Roses. It was aimed at the Australian press and public. 'OK, make a fuss over Guns N' Roses but at least know that Rose Tattoo exists.'"

Another line-up change occurred in mid-1989 when Morris left for eight months to join the Screaming Tribesmen but he rejoined before KOTS released their second album, Full Frontal Attack, in August 1990. It was produced by William Wittman. Dave Thoener returned to mix it, which was their last album for RCA. It reached the ARIA albums chart top 100. Kings of the Sun supported Lita Ford's US tour during late 1990 before returning to tour Australia and co-headlining with the Screaming Jets early in 1991. Morris and Ragg both left in 1992.

The band's third album Resurrection was released in April 1993 through Mushroom. It was recorded at A&M Studios and Paramount Studios and mastered at Precision Mastering. Kings of the Sun self-produced the album except for two tracks, "First Thing About Rock'n'Roll (I Remember)" and "Fuzz", by mixer Mark Dearnley. Phil Soussan (Ozzy Osbourne) played bass guitar on all tracks except of "Fuzz", which Brad Spurr contributed; Spurr joined on bass guitar after its release. Two singles were issued from the album, "Trapped Inside Your Heart" (April) and "Road to Nowhere" (July), which McFarlane observed, "offered further doses of raunchy rock'n'roll". The band supported Jimmy Barnes on his Australian tour during 1993.

Spurr left in 1995 and was replaced by Dean Turner on bass guitar. The band recorded a "live-in-the-studio" album Daddy Was a Hobo Man in 1997, but it was not released until 2011 as an independent release. Of the album, Clifford stated "we wanted to record with no commercial pressure what so ever, also, at the time we wanted to record as a 3 piece and live in the studio, this is what you're hearing." In May 1998 the band supported Sammy Hagar's Australian tour. Their line-up had the Hoad brothers joined by Quentin Elliot on guitar and Chris Lewis on bass guitar. Kings of the Sun officially disbanded in 2001.

=== 2002–2009: The Rich and Famous ===
In 2002 the Hoad brothers and Turner formed another band, the Rich and Famous, which issued three studio albums, The Rich and Famous (2004), Like a Superstar (2006) and Stand Back... Prepare to Be Amazed! (2007). Jeffrey left the music industry for personal reasons. Clifford and Jeffrey Hoad ceased working together in 2009 and continue to be estranged as from September 2017.

In 2016 Jeffrey and Turner revived the Rick and Famous with Dean Reeson on drums and they released a five-track extended play, Take Us to Your Leader, in the following year. In September 2017 Jeffrey explained his split with Clifford, "It’s not unusual that two brothers get a little bit sick of each other and separate. That’s all it is." He confirmed there were no moves to reunite. By 2019 the Rich and Famous were inactive.

=== 2010–present: Clifford Hoad's Kings of the Sun ===
In 2010 Clifford on lead vocals and drums, Elliot on guitar, Turner on bass guitar and Dave Talon (ex-Rollerball) on rhythm guitar developed Clifford Hoad's Kings of the Sun, without Jeffrey. In March 2013 they entered Govinda Doyle's studio to record Clifford's compositions. Bass tracks were recorded by Doyle who also engineered and produced the album with co-production by Clifford. Mixing was done by Govinda and Clifford.

The new album, Rock Til Ya Die, was released on 5 September 2013 via band's website. It is a return to classic Australian rock sound. Five music videos were shot by Dan Jensen and Trudy Martin of Darklight Studios, combining music clip with documentary style interviews with Clifford, who relates development of each song. The group released another album, Razed on Rock, on 20 October 2016 and then Playin' to the Heavens on 28 May 2017. Hoad has continued as lead vocalist and drummer. According to Steve Mascord of Hot Metal, Clifford's partner Lisa posted on social media accounts that Clifford had a "massive heart attack" in May 2024.

== Personnel ==
=== Current members ===
- Clifford Hoad - vocals, drums & percussion

=== Past members ===
- Jeffrey Hoad - lead vocals, guitars
- Anthony Ragg - bass
- Rowie Riot - lead guitar
- Shar Roxxon - rhythm guitar, keyboards & backing vocals
- Laurie Marlow - bass & backing vocals
- Quentin Elliot - lead guitar
- Dave Talon - rhythm guitar
- Baron von Berg - 2nd drums
- Darren Marlow - bass & backing vocals
- Glenn Morris - lead guitar
- Chris Lewis - bass
- Dean Turner - bass
- Brad Spurr - bass
- Ron Thiessen - lead guitar
- Tommy Poulter - lead guitar
- John McKinnon - bass
- Marlon Holden - bass
- Bob Spencer - lead guitar

=== Session musicians ===
- Gary Lee - bass *Full Frontal Attack album recording
- Phil Soussan - bass *Resurrection album recording
- Govinda Doyle - bass *Rock Til Ya Die album recording
- Craig Pesco - bass *Kiss concert at Carrara Stadium in 2001

== Discography ==
=== Studio albums ===
List of albums, with selected chart positions
Title	Album details	Peak chart positions
Title	Album details	AUS
Kings of the Sun	Released: October 1988; Format: LP, CD, cassette; Label: Mushroom (D38884)	88
Full Frontal Attack	Released: August 1990; Format: LP, CD, cassette; Label: Mushroom (TVC 93325)	93
Resurrection	Released: April 1993; Format: CD, Cassette; Label: Mushroom (D30888)	197
Daddy Was a Hobo Man	Released: 2011; Format: CD, download; Label: Kings of the Sun; Recorded in 1997	—
Rock Til Ya Die	Released: 2016; Format: CD, download; Label: Kings of the Sun; Recorded in 1997	—
Razed on Rock	Released: 2016; Format: CD, download; Label: Kings of the Sun	—
Playn' to the Heavens	Released: 2017; Format: CD, download; Label: Kings of the Sun	—

=== Singles ===
List of singles, with selected chart positions
Year	Title	Peak chart positions	Album
Year	Title	AUS	Album
1986	"Bottom of My Heart"	47	non album single
1988	"Serpentine"	48	Kings of the Sun
1988	"Black Leather"	53	Kings of the Sun
1990	"Drop the Gun"	82	Full Frontal Attack
1990	"Lock Me Up"	—	Full Frontal Attack
1990	"I Get Lonely"	152	Full Frontal Attack
1993	"Trapped Inside Your Heart"	131	Resurrection
1993	"Road to Nowhere"	—	Resurrection
1995	"Bombs Away"	—	non album single

== Awards and nominations ==
=== Countdown Australian Music Awards ===
Countdown was an Australian pop music TV series on national broadcaster ABC-TV from 1974 to 1987, it presented music awards from 1979 to 1987, initially in conjunction with magazine TV Week. The TV Week / Countdown Awards were a combination of popular-voted and peer-voted awards.

Year	Nominee / work	Award	Result
1986	themselves	Most Promising New Talent	Nominated
