= The Unloved Woman =

The Unloved Woman may refer to:

- The Unloved Woman (play), a 1913 play by Jacinto Benavente
- The Unloved Woman (1914 film), a Spanish silent film directed by Ricardo de Baños
- The Unloved Woman (1940 film), a Spanish film directed by José López Rubio
- The Unloved Woman (1949 film), a Mexican film directed by Emilio Fernández

== See also ==
- La malquerida (telenovela), a Mexican telenova
- Unloved (disambiguation)
