= Music Makers =

Music Makers or We Are the Music Makers may refer to:

== Music ==
=== Classical ===
- The Music Makers (Elgar), a musical setting of O'Shaughnessy's poem composed by Edward Elgar in 1912

=== Bands ===
- We Are the Music Makers (band), an American new prog band
- Harry James and His Music Makers, a big band led by Harry James in the 1930s and 1940s
- Blue Ridge Music Makers, an act associated with old-time fiddle player Charlie Bowman

=== Albums ===
- Music Makers (album), a 1986 album by Helen Merrill
- We Are the Music Makers, a 2005 album by Joy Electric

=== Songs ===
- "Music Makers", a 1940s big band piece by Al Lerner and Harry James
- "We Are the Music Makers," a track on Aphex Twin's album Selected Ambient Works 85–92
- "We Are the Music Makers," a song by Scarling. on the 2005 album So Long, Scarecrow

== Other ==
- Music Makers (TV series)
- Ode (poem), an 1874 poem by English poet Arthur O'Shaughnessy that begins: "We are the music makers."

== See also ==
- Music Maker (disambiguation)
