= Desire for Agony =

Studio album by Zeni Geva
- Released: 1993
- Recorded: September 1993
- Studio: The Basement in Chicago
- Genre: Noise rock
- Length: 38:28
- Label: Alternative Tentacles
- Producer: Steve Albini

Zeni Geva chronology
| Disgraceland (1993) | Desire for Agony (1993) | Nai-Ha (1993) |

Professional ratings
Review scores
| Source | Rating |
|---|---|
| AllMusic | 4/5 stars |

Desire for Agony is a 1993 album by Japanese noise rock band Zeni Geva. It was recorded in September 1993 at The Basement in Chicago, Illinois and was produced by Steve Albini.

== Track listing ==
All tracks written by Zeni Geva.

| No. | Title | Length |
|---|---|---|
| 1. | "Stigma" | 2:37 |
| 2. | "Dead Sun Rising" | 3:04 |
| 3. | "Desire for Agony" | 2:42 |
| 4. | "Heathen Blood" | 5:35 |
| 5. | "Disgraceland" | 3:45 |
| 6. | "Whiteout" | 5:50 |
| 7. | "Love Bite" | 4:07 |
| 8. | "Autopsy Love" | 3:28 |
| 9. | "The Body" | 7:17 |
| Total length: | | 38:28 |

== Personnel ==
Zeni Geva

- KK Null – vocals, guitar, design
- Tabata – guitar
- Eito – drums

Additional personnel

- Steve Albini – production, engineering
- Mark Fischer – cover painting
- Hiroko Shirasaki – photography
