= Maximum Money Monster =

- Original 1990 Artwork

Studio album by Zeni Geva
- Released: 1990
- Recorded: 1988–1989; 1990 (reissue material)
- Studio: Studio TAKE, Tokyo; Antiknock, Tokyo (reissue material)
- Genre: Noise rock, industrial metal
- Length: 46:03; 64:18 (reissue)
- Label: Pathological; Cold Spring (reissue)
- Producer: Kazuyuki K. Null, Takashi Iwamoto

Zeni Geva chronology
Vast Impotenz (1988)	Maximum Money Monster (1990)	Total Castration (1991)

Professional ratings
Review scores
Source	Rating
Brainwashed	favorable
Chain D.L.K.	4/5 stars
Compulsion Online	favorable

Maximum Money Monster is a 1990 album by Zeni Geva. It is a re-release of their 1989 album Maximum Love and Fuck, with additional songs. The Pathological CD release had the whole album as one track. In 2007, it was reissued by Cold Spring with three bonus previously unreleased recordings from a 1990 show at Antiknock in Tokyo, and all songs as separate tracks.

== Reception ==
Though not reviewed by many publications, the album has received some praise among critics. Likening the band to noise rock and industrial music, the album was compared to groups stylistically such as Swans and Godflesh and it was noted that the "metal riffage...is stripped of excess" in a review written for Compulsion Online. Writing for Chain D.L.K., Maurizio Pustianaz similarly noted hardcore punk, industrial, and free jazz influences.

== Track listing ==
All tracks are written by KK Null, unless where noted

No.	Title	Writer(s)	Length
1.	"Slam King" (from Maximum Love and Fuck)		16:03
2.	"Honowo (Blaze)"		1:51
3.	"Blackout"		1:46
4.	"Sweetheart"		5:45
5.	"Guystick Bodie" (from Maximum Love and Fuck)		4:35
6.	"Skullfuck" (from Maximum Love and Fuck)		3:15
7.	"War Pig" (from Maximum Love and Fuck)		6:51
8.	"On Suicide"	Bertolt Brecht/Hanns Eisler	5:58

2007 Cold Spring reissue bonus tracks
No.	Title	Length
9.	"War Pig" (live)	7:29
10.	"Skullfuck" (live)	4:10
11.	"Dead Car, Sun Crash" (live)	6:37
Total length:		64:18

== Credits ==
- KK Null - vocals, guitars, engineering
- Mara Tabata - guitars
- Tatsuya Yoshida - drums (tracks 2, 3, 4, and 8), vocals (tracks 2 and 8)
- Ikuo Taketani - drums (tracks 1, 5, 6, and 7), artwork (original release)
- Takashi Iwamoto - engineering
- Yuki Torumi - artwork (original release)
- Abby Helasdottir - artwork (reissue)
