= Unloved (disambiguation) =

Unloved is a 2001 Japanese romance film.

Unloved or The Unloved may also refer to:

- The Unloved, a British television drama film
- The Unloved (TV series), a 1968 Australian courtroom drama TV series
- "Unloved" (Law & Order: UK), an episode of Unloved Law & Order
- Unloved (album), by Scottish mathcore band Frontierer
- "Unloved", a song by Jann Arden from her 1994 album Living Under June
- Unloved (band), an American alternative music group

== See also ==
- La malquerida (telenovela), a Mexican telenova
- The Unloved Woman (disambiguation)
