= We Be the Echo =

American instrumental rock band

We Be The Echo
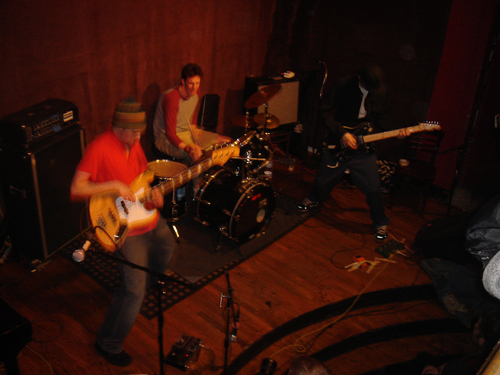

Background information
- Origin: San Francisco, California, United States
- Genres: Math rock
- Years active: 2003–present
- Label: Chuckbeat Records
- Spinoff of: Bm Relocation Program
- Members: Graeme Nicholls; Ilk Koskelo; Myke Stryker
- Website: webetheecho.com

We Be the Echo is an American instrumental rock band from San Francisco. They play a blend of math rock, brutal prog, punk, jazz and heavy metal with dub influenced bass lines. The band's sound is based on melodic and rhythmically challenging short songs that often incorporate shred guitar. They formed in 2003 from the remnants of the Bay Area experimental band Bm Relocation Program.

The band members have also variously played (or continue to play) in other bands/projects including UK-based hardcore punk bands Voorhees and Break It Up, and San Francisco-based The John Francis, Desire Paths, Life Fire In Peopledom, The Mao, Drift Erratics, Bm Relocation Program and others.

== Members ==
- Graeme Nicholls - Guitar
- Myke Stryker - Bass
- Ilk Koskelo - Drums

== Discography ==
- Cubist Music EP (2004) - Chuckbeat Records
- Dry Or Damp - I'm Still The Champ (2006) - Copper Press Magazine Compilation No. 27
- Stanislaw Stories LP (2006) - Chuckbeat Records
- All-Star Destroyers EP (2007/08) - Chuckbeat/Brutal Prog/Mandai
- Masks LP (2009) - Chuckbeat/Brutal Prog
- Return To Nations LP (2011) - Chuckbeat Records

== See also ==
- List of math rock groups
- Experimental rock

== Sources ==
- Soundshock (UK) (Review)
- Spinning Platters (SF) (Interview)
- Grand Street News (NYC) (Live review)
- San Fran Voice (SF) (Interview) - retrieved on October 27, 2008
- News Review (Chico) (Article) - retrieved on October 27, 2008
- The Owl (Review) - retrieved on October 27, 2008
- 30music.com (Canada) (Review) - retrieved October 31, 2008
- Bandcamp Daily (Article) retrieved July 26, 2019
