= Cymbals (Japanese band) =

Japanese pop rock band (1997–2004)

- From left: Okii, Toki and Yano, 2000

Background information
- Also known as: Spaghetti Charlie (1997); The Artists Formerly Known As Cymbals (2004)
- Origin: Shibuya, Tokyo
- Genres: Art rock; bossa nova; chamber pop
- Works: Discography
- Years active: 1997–2004
- Labels: Living, Dining & Kitchen; Victor; Tower To The People; Think!; Kissing Fish
- Spinoffs: Tweedees; Frog
- Past members: Asako Toki; Reiji Okii; Hiroyasu Yano
- Website: JVC Artist Page

Cymbals (シンバルズ) was a Japanese pop rock band active from 1997–2004. The trio was composed of vocalist Asako Toki (土岐麻子), bassist/guitarist Reiji Okii (沖井礼二), and drummer Hiroyasu Yano (矢野博康). Like other Japanese bands which emerged in the late 1990s (including Clammbon and Hermann H. & the Pacemakers), Cymbals were strongly influenced by the British pop-rock sounds of the 1960s. Due to their eclectic blend of styles, the band is often linked to Shibuya-kei. Despite solid songwriting and album production, they never scored a true "hit", which eventually resulted in the band's breakup in September 2003. They played a final 90-minute farewell concert at Shibuya O-East on January 20, 2004. The group's members remain musically active – Toki as a solo artist, Okii as a producer (for Toki and others), and Yano as a session drummer and producer.

== Discography ==
- That's Entertainment (2000)
- Mr. Noone Special (2000)
- Sine (2002)
- Love You (2003)
