= Music Maker =

Music Maker may refer to:

- Music Maker Publications, a British publishing company
- Music Maker Relief Foundation, an American non-profit organisation promoting blues music and musicians
- Magix Music Maker, a digital audio software product

== See also ==
- Music Makers (disambiguation)
