= Noisegate =

American experimental band

Noisegate was a group of artists dedicated to the exploration of sound as an artistic medium, based in Oakland, California, United States. Constantly recording, touring, and collaborating with other experimental artists and filmmakers, they became a staple of the Bay Area experimental music and sound-art scenes between 1995 and 2002.

== Biography ==
Noisegate began in 1995, when Trevor Paglen, Nicolas Lampert and Tae K Kim began to experiment with using timbre as a basis for a musical language. In November 1995, Excavation Day was released. This tape-only release, limited to 500 copies, is an early document of their development. Barren Earth was released in the summer of 1996, and at this point, Noisegate's musical language had expanded to include a much wider range of textures, all of which were composed into one another. An early version of "Solar Eclipse" was on this release.

In the fall of 1996, now consisting of Trevor Paglen, Nicolas Lampert, and Sean Thomas, Noisegate embarked on their first major tour of the United States, with filmmaker Laura Klein. Upon their return, Chris Fitzpatrick was enlisted to run sampler. This new lineup began reworking the music which became the Towers Are Burning LP, produced by Lars Savage and released in 1998 by the One Hundred Years of Solitude label. After several tours supporting the LP across the US and in Canada, it was decided to record two more tracks, and release all four on Tumult Records and Legion Records as the Towers Are Burning CD. One of these tracks, "Alamogordo", featured Dave Edwardson of Neurosis on bass guitar and vocals. Noisegate also recorded As We Were Walking, a split-release with KK Null on Wagenhault Records.

After more touring, Nicolas Lampert left Noisegate and Chris Fitzpatrick and Trevor Paglen began work on Suspended Animation (Vol. 1), where the new emphasis of the compositions were fluidity and subtlety. Suspended Animation was released in May 2000, and supported that summer with a lengthy multimedia tour of the US, accompanied by filmmaker Jon Frechette. This tour included a string of West Coast tour dates with Bastard Noise.

We Stood There Watching was a recorded version of the interpretations of Suspended Animation that Noisegate performed on their U.S. tour, and was released exclusively in Europe in December 2001 on Manufracture, and supported by a European tour in January 2001. Where in the past, Noisegate tours have created rich and immersive multimedia environments, for this tour, the opposite was achieved. The performances occurred in absolute darkness with the performers unseen, disarming rather than facilitating spectacle.

Noisegate amicably disbanded in 2002 to pursue other projects.

== Discography ==
Albums:

- Noisegate, We Stood There Watching (2001) (limited European-only release) Manufracture Records
- Noisegate, Suspended Animation (vol. 1) (2000) Tumult Records
- Noisegate, The Towers Are Burning (1999) (full-length compact disc) Tumult Records
- Noisegate, As We Were Walking (1999) (split 7” with KK Null) Wagonhault Records
- Noisegate, Towers Are Burning (1998) (original LP version, edition of 1000, out of print)
- Noisegate, Barren Earth (1996) (tape edition of 500, out of print)
- Noisegate, Excavation Day (1995) (tape edition of 500, out of print)

Compilation albums featuring Noisegate:

- In Formation: A Tribute To Throbbing Gristle (Released on ADR and Invisible Records)
- Audio Terrorism: 99 Bands (Released on C.N.P Records)

== See also ==
- Sound art
- Noise music
- Experimental music
