= Stove (surname) =

Stove is a surname, and may refer to:

- David Stove (1927–1994), Australian philosopher
- Johnathan Stove (born 1995), American basketball player
- R. J. Stove (born 1961), Australian writer and composer

== See also ==
- Betty Stöve (born 1945), Dutch tennis player
- Stover (surname)
- Shove, surname
