= That's Entertainment (album) =

2000 album by Japanese shibuya-kei band Cymbals

Studio album by Cymbals
- Released: January 21, 2000
- Recorded: February 10–June 17, 1999
- Genres: Pop rock; shibuya-kei; chamber pop; bossa nova; yacht rock
- Length: 43:23
- Label: Victor

Cymbals chronology
| Missile & Chocolate (1998) | That's Entertainment (2000) | Mr. Noone Special (2000) |

Singles from That's Entertainment
- 1. "What A Shiny Day" Released: May 8, 1999; 2. "RALLY" Released: August 25, 1999; 3. "My Brave Face" Released: December 1, 1999

That's Entertainment is the first studio album by the Japanese pop rock band Cymbals, released on January 21, 2000, by Victor Entertainment. Its songs were mainly written and composed by Reiji Okii, the band's bassist. Three singles supported it; with the latter two being advertised as the album's major singles and receiving music videos.

That's Entertainment received positive reviews from critics, and it peaked at number 45 on the Oricon Albums chart, becoming the band's second highest charting performance.

== Background ==
In 1997, while living as a student in university, musician Reiji Okii formed the pop rock band "Spaghetti Charlie", later changing its name to "Cymbals". Okii dropped out later that year, and recruited vocalist Asako Toki and drummer Hiroyasu Yano into the Cymbals after meeting them through music circles. Cymbals subsequently signed with the independent Japanese record label LD&K, releasing their debut mini album Neat, or Cymbal! in 1998.

Cymbals later signed a recording contract with the Japanese record label Victor Entertainment, which released their major label debut "Escape Plan at 8 AM (This is what you want, but this is what you get)" in June 1999, the b-sides to the single were "Answer Song" and a cover of the English rock band The Rolling Stones song "Stupid Girl".

== Production ==
While writing ideas for That's Entertainment, Toki spontaneously brought up the word "Rally", leading Okii to write a song around it. "My Brave Face" begins with a short whistling intro. When asked by Victor if he wanted to collaborate with any artists for their major album debut with the label, Okii chose Kotaro Furuichi of The Collectors.

Present on several tracks of the album is the character "Mr. Noone Special", conducting fake street interviews. The character would later be expanded upon on the Cymbals second studio album, named after the character, released later the same year on September 21, 2000. Toki sings nearly all tracks on the album in English, with the exception of "RALLY", which is also sung in Japanese.

== Release ==
"What A Shiny Day" was released as the first single from the album, followed by "RALLY" on August 25, 1999, which was advertised in TV commercials, and "My Brave Face" on December 1, neither song charted on the Oricon Singles chart. That's Entertainment was heavily anticipated, and released on January 21, 2000. It appeared 3 times on the Oricon albums chart, peaking at number 45, and has remained Cymbals' second highest charting album as of October 2026.

On September 25, 2013, a reissue of That's Entertainment and Mr. Noone Special was released exclusively for sale at Tower Records Japan. The latter album features the bonus song "Business Show", a rearrangement of "Show Business". Whilst touring in promotion for their fourth studio album Love You (2003), the band released the live album Requests! on September 8, 2003, containing live versions of several tracks from That's Entertainment.

== Reception ==
Professional ratings
Review scores
| Source | Rating |
|---|---|
| Moma-BD | 4/5 stars |
| CDJournal | (positive) |
| Sputnikmusic | 3.9/5 |

That's Entertainment received positive reviews from critics following its release, with the band subsequently being labeled as one to watch. Sayuki of Moma-BD gave the album four out of five stars, complimenting the album's sound, although finding the 2013 reissue to be of poor quality.

CDJournal reviewed the album positively, stating if viewers didn't view the album favorably, they should "leave" Earth. They additionally compared "Rally" to doing laundry on a Sunday morning, and called "My Brave Face" exquisite pop music, viewing its tight rhythm section favorably.

== Track listing ==
All tracks are written by Reiji Okii, except where noted.

That's Entertainment track listing
| No. | Title | Writer(s) | Length |
|---|---|---|---|
| 1. | "Show Business" | | 2:22 |
| 2. | "What A Shiny Day" | | 2:58 |
| 3. | "So You Want To Be A Rock n' Roll Star #4" | | 0:48 |
| 4. | "Rain Song" | | 2:28 |
| 5. | "So What?" | | 4:03 |
| 6. | "So You Want To Be A Rock n' Roll Star #5" | | 1:14 |
| 7. | "RALLY" | Asako Toki; Reiji Okii | 3:39 |
| 8. | "Air Guitar" | | 5:24 |
| 9. | "Answer Song" | | 5:10 |
| 10. | "Mach 0.8" | | 3:14 |
| 11. | "So You Want To Be A Rock n' Roll Star #6" | | 1:25 |
| 12. | "My Brave Face" | | 4:38 |
| 13. | "Muzak Cycle" | | 4:09 |
| 14. | "What's Entertainment?" | Chinami Nishino | 2:38 |
| Total length: | | | 43:23 |

== Charts ==
Oricon album charts
| Chart (2000) | Peak position |
|---|---|
| Albums Chart (Oricon) | 45 |

== Personnel ==
Credits adapted from the album's back notes.

- Asako Toki – lead vocals
- Reiji Okii – mixing engineer, production, bass, backing vocals, writing
- Hiroyasu Yano – drums, percussion
- Miyako Yoneyama (Citrobal) – piano
- Harumoto Uchida (Jet Lag) – guitar
- Kotaro Furuichi (The Collectors) – guitar (track 7, 12)
- Chinami Nishino (Sylvia 55) – backing vocals, writing
