= Mr. Noone Special =

2000 album by Japanese shibuya-kei band Cymbals

Studio album by Cymbals
- Released: September 21, 2000
- Recorded: November 1999–May 13, 2000
- Genres: Pop rock; shibuya-kei; chamber pop
- Length: 31:08
- Label: Victor

Cymbals chronology
| That's Entertainment (2000) | Mr. Noone Special (2000) | Respects (2001) |

Singles from Mr. Noone Special
- 1. "Do You Believe In Magic?" Released: April 21, 2000; 2. "Highway Star, Speed Star" Released: August 23, 2000

Mr. Noone Special is the second studio album by the Japanese pop rock band Cymbals, released on September 21, 2000, by Victor Entertainment. Its songs were mainly written and composed by Reiji Okii, the band's bassist. Two singles supported it; the first was "Do You Believe In Magic?", while the second, "Highway Star, Speed Star", was the album's major single.

Mr. Noone Special received positive reviews from critics, who praised its inventiveness and lauded its creativity. It peaked at number 44 on the Oricon albums chart, becoming the band's best-known performance.

== Background ==
The Japanese pop rock band Cymbals had previously released their debut studio album That's Entertainment (2000) just 8 months prior, which featured the character "Mr. Noone Special", appearing in interlude tracks on the album. Reiji Okii, the Cymbals bassist, intentionally combined the words "No" and "One" to create a single word, imagining the character whilst in the shower, basing him off himself, with the character referring to himself as both "nothing", and "everyone".

== Composition ==
Mr. Noone Special maintains a pop rock soundscape, featuring segments of French pop and elements of jazz, taking influence from English rock bands such as The Beatles and The Who. Mr. Noone Special focuses mainly on both guitars and piano, with lead vocalist Asako Toki singing in often "cutesy" vocals, and in English throughout most of the album.

== Release ==
"Do You Believe In Magic?" was released as a single on April 21, 2000, followed by "Highway Star, Speed Star" on August 23. Mr. Noone Special was eventually released on September 21, 2000, by Victor Entertainment, a special limited edition release also included the bonus song "Good-night". Mr. Noone Special appeared 3 times on the Oricon albums chart, peaking at number 44, and has remained Cymbals' highest charting album as of February 2026.

On September 25, 2013, a reissue of Mr. Noone Special was released exclusively for sale at Tower Records Japan. It contains the bonus songs "Out of Order", and "Business Show", a rearrangement of "Show Business", which was featured on their debut studio album That's Entertainment (2000). Whilst touring in promotion for their fourth studio album Love You (2003), the band released the live album Requests! on September 8, 2003, containing live versions of the tracks "Highway Star, Speed Star" and "Do You Believe in Magic?"

== Reception ==
Professional ratings
Review scores
| Source | Rating |
|---|---|
| Moma-BD | 4/5 stars |
| Sputnikmusic | 3.6/5 |

Upon release, Mr. Noone Special received positive reviews from critics. Sayuki of Moma-BD gave the album a four out of five, calling it and the bands debut album That's Entertainment (2000), the band's masterpieces. Akihisa Ikeda, the manga artist of Rosario + Vampire, stated that when the series was adapted into an anime, he requested the opening imitate the song "Highway Star, Speed Star", leading the songs to sound similar to each other. In 2025, "Hey, Leader!" appeared as a part of a Laura Nyro radio tribute show on the New Jersey radio station WFMU.

== Track listing ==
All tracks are written by Reiji Okii, except where noted.

Mr. Noone Special track listing
| No. | Title | Writer(s) | Length |
|---|---|---|---|
| 1. | "Mr. Noone Special" | | 2:47 |
| 2. | "Low Cost, Low Price & High Return" | | 3:20 |
| 3. | "Intermission #1" | | 0:40 |
| 4. | "All You Need Is Word" | | 3:51 |
| 5. | "Do You Believe In Magic?" | | 3:09 |
| 6. | "Liar・Sadist・Coward" | | 3:18 |
| 7. | "Hey, Leader" | Hiroyasu Yano | 2:57 |
| 8. | "Intermission #2" | | 0:41 |
| 9. | "Highway Star, Speed Star" | | 4:21 |
| 10. | "River Deep, Mountain High" | | 3:14 |
| 11. | "(Inside of Me)" | | 0:40 |
| 12. | "Mr.Noone Special (Reprise)" | | 2:59 |
| Total length: | | | 32:38 |

Special edition
| No. | Title | Length |
|---|---|---|
| 13. | "Good-Night" (bonus track) | 3:05 |
| Total length: | | 35:03 |

== Charts ==
Oricon album charts
| Chart (2000) | Peak position |
|---|---|
| Albums Chart (Oricon) | 44 |

== Personnel ==
Credits adapted from the album's liner notes.

- Asako Toki – lead vocals
- Reiji Okii – mixing engineer, lead guitar, bass, percussion, writing
- Hiroyasu Yano – drums
- Oki Yuichi – Steinway piano (track 2)
- NARGO – trumpet (track 2)
- Isao Kaneyama – Deagan vibraphone (track 2)
- Miyako Yonegawa – triangle (track 2, 9–10), Musser vibraphone (track 9–10)
- Harumoto Uchida – Fender Stratocaster (track 3–9), Epiphone Sheraton (track 6–7, 10, 12)
- Chinami Nishino – Steinway piano (track 4)
- Ichiro Koizumi – Yamaha piano (track 5–7, 9–10, 12), Musser vibraphone, Hammond organ (track 8–9)
- Takafumi Sugawara – hand clapping (track 7)
- Ryo Tanaka – hand clapping (track 7)
- Satoshi Sano – trombone (track 10)
- Masayuki Kuramoto – bongo drums (track 10)
