= Zeni Geva =

Japanese noise rock band

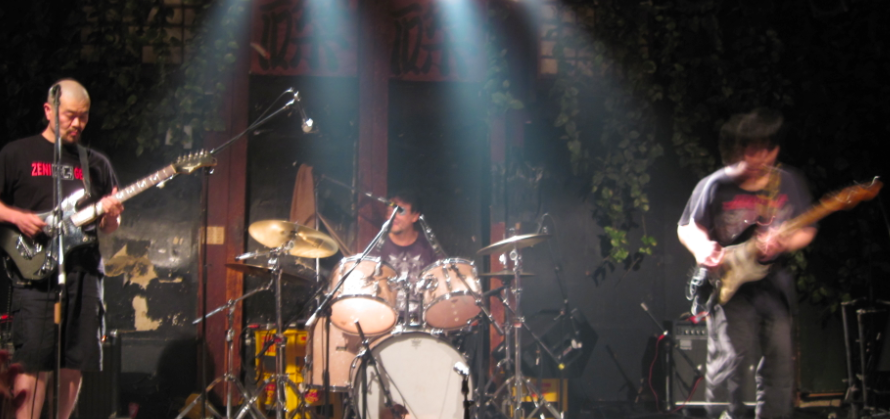
- KK Null, Tatsuya Yoshida, and Mitsuru Tabata, live in 2009

Background information
- Origin: Tokyo, Japan
- Genres: Heavy metal, hardcore punk, progressive rock, noise rock, math rock
- Years active: 1987–present
- Labels: NUX Organization; Skin Graft Records; Alternative Tentacles; Neurot Recordings
- Members: KK Null; Tatsuya Yoshida
- Past members: Ikuo Taketani; Fumiyoshi Suzuki; Elle; Bunsho Nishikawa; Mitsuru Tabata; Yasuko; Eito Noro; Blake Fleming; Masataka Fujikake
- Website: Official KK Null webpage

Zeni Geva is a Japanese noise rock band featuring singer and guitarist KK Null and drummer Tatsuya Yoshida. Formed in Tokyo in 1987 as a quartet, the group's name translates roughly as "money violence" ("Zeni" is an old Japanese term for money, and "Geva" comes from the German "Gewalt," meaning "violence").

Zeni Geva performed as a trio of two guitars and drums for most of their existence. Their music can be diverse and experimental, incorporating elements ranging from death metal and hardcore punk to math rock, psychedelic, and noise rock. Their music is often technically unorthodox and demanding, and has earned progressive rock comparisons: critic Patrick Kennedy describes their 1993 album Desire for Agony as resembling "Motörhead meets King Crimson."

The Chicago-based Skin Graft Records has released much of the band's music in North America, and the band released several albums with the American Alternative Tentacles label.

== History ==
Following several years in the Japanese noise rock scene that included collaborations with Merzbow and Hanatarashi, experimental noise rock guitarist and electronic programmer KK Null formed Zeni Geva in 1987 with guitarist Fumiyoshi Suzuki (also known as "NP"), vocalist Elle, and drummer Ikuo Taketani of the Japanese experimental groups The Boredoms and Hanatarashi. The group released its debut record, How to Kill, on Null's own NUX Organization label later that year. With bassist Bunsho Nishikawa replacing Elle, they released the Vast Impotenz cassette early in 1988.

Following the departure of Suzuki and Nishikawa, Null and Taketani were ultimately joined by permanent guitarist Mitsuru Tabata (also of The Boredoms) in 1988, and the group released the album Maximum Love and Fuck. Tatsuya Yoshida of the progressive rock band Ruins also joined later this year, replacing Taketani. They released the Maximum Money Monster album in 1990, packaging Maximum Love and Fuck with additional tracks featuring Yoshida on drums.

Yoshida left in 1990 and continued his prolific and lauded career with Ruins and in other projects. He was briefly replaced by drummer Yasuko, but Zeni Geva found a longer standing replacement in Eito Noro. This lineup began extensive world tours, catching the eye of such noteworthy rock figures as Steve Albini, who produced their 1991 album Total Castration, and Jello Biafra, who signed them to his Alternative Tentacles record label. They next released 1992's Live in Amerika and the collaborative All Right You Little Bastards live album with Albini performing with the band. The Albini-produced Desire for Agony marked Zeni Geva's Alternative Tentacles debut, and was followed by 1995's Freedom Bondage.

Noro left the band in 1996, and the band toured with temporary replacement Blake Fleming, an American musician. Masataka Fujikake joined as drummer shortly thereafter, and the group embarked upon further extensive touring. Despite this activity, the band did not release another studio album until 2001, six years after Freedom Bondage. Their next record, 10,000 Light Years, was released on the Neurot Recordings label, and marked their most experimental effort. Null had been making increasing use of electronic instruments of his own design, and his "nulltron" device featured prominently on 10,000 Light Years. A live album, Last Nanosecond - Live in Geneva 2002, followed in 2004.

Fujikake departed, and the band was inactive for the next several years. Null remained prolific via solo and collaborative releases, while Tabata worked with several projects, including Acid Mothers Temple. Maximum Money Monster was remastered and re-released with bonus tracks in 2007.

In 2009, Yoshida rejoined Zeni Geva, and they returned to touring. The live album Alive and Rising, recorded in September 2009 and released in February 2010, captured a live performance from this incarnation of Zeni Geva. Total Castration, remastered by Null, followed on the Nux Organization label in 2012. A European tour followed in October with a two-piece lineup of Null and Yoshida, marking Tabata's departure after more than two decades with the group.

== Band members ==
Current members

- Kazuyuki K. Null – guitar, vocals, violin, ultrasonik, nulltron, kaosspad (1987–present)
- Tatsuya Yoshida – drums, kaosspad, vocals (1988–1990, 2009–present)

Former members

- Ikuo Taketani – drums (1987–1988)
- Fumiyoshi Suzuki – guitar (1987–1988)
- Elle – vocals (1987)
- Bunsho Nishikawa – bass (1988)
- Mitsuru Tabata – guitar, synthesizer (1988–2012)
- Yasuko – drums (1990–1991)
- Eito Noro – drums (1991–1996)
- Blake Fleming – drums (1996)
- Masataka Fujikake – drums (1996–2003)

Timeline

- Note: the band was inactive from 2003 to September 2009.

== Discography ==
Studio albums

- Maximum Love and Fuck (1989)
- Maximum Money Monster (1990, re-released in 2007)
- Total Castration (1991, re-released in 2012)
- Desire for Agony (1993)
- Freedom Bondage (1995)
- 10,000 Light Years (2001)

EPs and singles

- Vast Impotenz cassette (1988)
- Honowoh/Sweetheart/Bloodsex 7" (1991)
- Nai-Ha EP (1992)
- Disgraceland "7" (1993)
- Autofuck 7" (1993)
- Hatetrader split w/ X-Rated-X (1994)
- Black Room split w/ Meathead 7" (1994)
- Implosion (1995)

Live albums

- How To Kill (1987)
- Live 20000V split w/ Lewd (1992)
- Live In Amerika (1992)
- All Right You Little Bastards (live collaboration with Steve Albini) (1993)
- Trance Europe Experience (1994)
- Last Nanosecond - Live in Geneva 2002 (2004)
- Alive and Rising (2010)
