= Voorhees (band) =

English punk band

- Voorhees performing live in 1995 at the 1 in 12 Club

Background information
- Origin: Durham, England
- Genre: Hardcore punk
- Years active: 1991–2001, 2004, 2010, 2012–present
- Label: Armed With Anger Records
- Members: Ian Leck; Sean Readman; Rob Bewick; Dave Allen
- Past members: Darrell Hindley; David Brown; Gary Cousins; Michael Gillham; Graeme Nicholls; Gareth Pugh; Local Student Chris; Paul Rugman-Jones; Andrew Wright; Richard Armitage; James Atkinson; Steve Stewart; Sam Layzell; Jonny Payne; Steven Fletcher; Tom Chapman

Voorhees is a hardcore punk band formed in Durham, England. From early 1991 until late 2001 they released records on international record labels and toured Europe and the USA.

== History ==
=== Origins and early years ===
In the late 1980s, vocalist Ian Leck and guitarist Sean Readman were members of Durham straight edge hardcore band Steadfast. In 1990, while still in Steadfast, Leck began a brief side project, called Know Your Enemy, which was heavily inspired by Judge with bassist Buzzard, who had recently been released from prison for grievous bodily harm, drummer Gary Cousins and guitarist Darrell Hindley, who both played in another Durham straight edge hardcore band called False Face. Buzzard departed from the band a few weeks after formation, leading to hiring of David "Brownie" Brown. By the time Steadfast and False Face had broken up in 1991, the four members decided to regroup with the addition of Steadfast guitarist Sean Readman, who had a single rehearsal with Know Your Enemy material, before deciding to distance themselves from those songs and pursue a faster Boston hardcore-inspired sound under a different name.

Taking on the name Voorhees, in reference to Jason Voorhees from the Friday the 13th franchise, the band played their first performance in September 1991 at the Durham Rowing Club in support of punk band Sour Face. Soon after, the recorded their debut demo Everyone's Good at Something... Except Us! in Hartlepool. The demo was recorded for free by Leck, as a part of his college music engineering course. Soon after, they won two free days recording time at Consett's North Studios, but Brown left the group a few days beforehand, leading to Readman performing bass on the recordings. By the time they began performing again, they had hired former-Steadfast bassist Paul Rugman-Jones to take over for Brown. This recording was released as the Violent EP in April 1993 through Armed with Anger records.

The band then opened for Slapshot on their UK headline tour, and recorded two Negative Approach covers for a tribute compilation. Hindley and Cousins left the group around this time, leading to the band recruiting Sour Face drummer Michael Gillham and new guitarist Graeme Nicholls.

=== 1994–1998: Spilling Blood Without Reason and Fireproof EP ===
The band recorded their debut album Spilling Blood Without Reason at Studio 64 in Middlesbrough with producer Matthew Burke. They had originally written sixteen tracks for the album, but because their name was based on Friday the 13th, they decided to write an additional ten tracks so that each side of vinyl could consist of thirteen tracks. In August 1994, headlined a European tour, intended to be supported by Finnish band Selfish, but when Selfish dropped out Force Macabra were booked to replace them. The tour was planned to last for three and a half weeks, but due to Force Macabra also dropping out, it only lasted two.

Voorhees recorded a John Peel Session for BBC Radio 1 at Maida Vale studios in London in March 1995, which was first broadcast the following month. The session was then re-recorded for a split EP with Stalingrad. At the beginning of 1996, they had their first US headline tour, supported by Hatebreed. After this tour, Readman and Gillham left the band causing the hiring Richard Armitage on guitar and Gareth Pugh on drums. A few days later, Nicholls announced he was moving to San Francisco and could no longer be a part of the band, being replaced by James Atkinson, a local skater. This line-up was set to make its live debut on their 1996 European headline tour, but it was cancelled shortly before it was intended to take place, and instead first performed publicly in Bristol, supported by Stalingrad.

Pugh was soon replaced by Local Student Chris, who performed with the band opening for Sick of it All in Bradford and then Agnostic Front in London before being forced to take part in military service in Greece. This meant that Gillham returned to the band for a short period, when they headlined their second US tour with support from Dropdead, Charles Bronson, Devoid of Faith and Kill Your Idols. During this period they recorded the Fireproof EP at Technical Ecstasy studios in New Jersey. After the tour, David Allen became their new drummer and Rugman-Jones left the band to become an environmental biologist after the tour, leading to ban hiring new bassist Andrew Wright.

=== 1999–2001: 13th and Crystal Lake's Legacy ===
From August 1998 and April 1999, the band recorded their second album at Lowfold Studios in Lancaster, which would be released under the name 13th through Armed with Anger and Six Weeks records. Wright was asked to leave the band soon after due to his addiction to heroin, with his role briefing being filled by Atkinson, before hiring Steve Stewart.

This line-up toured the US with Kill Your Idols, the Nerve Agents and the Explosion in 1999, and then took part in a European tour. They then recorded their third album Crystal Lake's Legacy, which was released in 2001, before breaking up.

=== 2004–present: Reunions ===
In October 2004, the 'Spilling Blood Without Reason' line-up of Voorhees got together for a one-off show, "Night of the Living Dead at Sea", which was played on a ferry boat on the Mersey River in Liverpool.

On 23 and 24 April 2010, Voorhees re-banded to do shows in Amsterdam (Netherlands) and Leeds(UK). These gigs were meant to be with the classic 'Spilling Blood' line-up, but the volcano ash cloud which grounded all flights to and from Europe the week previous meant Graeme and Paul could not make it as they got stuck in the US Sam Layzell filled in for both shows. He also played in Leeds bands such as Closure, Bonestorm and SickFuckinO with Ian Leck. Ian Leck and Sam Layzell have gone on to provide vocals and bass respectively for Rot in Hell alongside fellow Voorhees guitarist James Atkinson.

On Sunday 13 May 2012 Voorhees played an impromptu set at Morrowfest in Nottingham as a tribute to their friend John Paul Morrow who died 10 years ago. This prompted them to reform with a pick and mix line up from all the previous incarnations of the band, they played with Negative Approach in Manchester on Tuesday 16 October 2012, followed by '20 years of Violent' at Bradford 1 in 12 club 23 March 2013, 'Slow End Fest' in Eindhoven 8 June 2013, with Sick of it all (20 years since the first time they played together) in Manchester 28 August, with Indecision in London (Underworld, Camden) on 25 October 2013 and in October 2014 Voorhees returned to Eindhoven for Bloodshed Fest.

== Musical style ==
Voorhees play the genre hardcore punk, influenced by SSD, Negative Approach and Negative FX. Maximumrocknroll described their music as "harkening back to the days of hardcore bands having something that drove them, the kind of anger and frustration that drives some people out of the room and has others turning it up louder". Kerrang! described the band's sound as a "blistering" cross between "Discharge and Extreme Noise Terror". In his book Armed with Anger, Ian Glasper described them as "ultra raw - Boston hardcore workship... like a bloody machete through buttered brains", and in Trapped in a Scene he described their sound as a "bad-tempered take on brutal old school hardcore".

== Discography ==
Albums

- Spilling Blood Without Reason LP (1994, Armed with Anger records)
- 13 LP (1999, Six Weeks records and Armed with Anger records)
- Crystal Lake's Legacy LP (2001, Six Weeks records)

EPs

- Violent 7-inch (1993, Armed with Anger records)
- Everybody's Good at Something... Except Us! (1994, Armed with Anger records)
- Gimmie, Gimmie, Gimmie / State Oppression (1994, Armed with Anger records)
- What You See Is What You Get (1997, Crust records)
- Fireproof (1998, Chainsaw Safety records)
- Bookburner (2000, THD records)

Splits

- split 7-inch w/ Stalingrad (1995, Thinking Smart records and Caught Offside records)
- split LP" w/ Devoid of Faith (1999, Coalition records and Gloom records)
- split 7-inch w/ Kill Your Idols (2000, Indecision records)
- split 7-inch w/ Insult (2000, Balowski records)
- split CD w/ Out Cold (2000, Blackfish records)
- split 12-inch w/ Out Cold (2001, Deranged records)
- split 7-inch w/ Radio Alice (2004, Hermit records)

Demos

- Everybody's Good at Something... Demo Tape (1992)
- Fowlers Yard Demo Tape (1992 unreleased)

Compilations

- Smiling at Death CD (1996, Grand Theft Audio records)
- The Final Chapter CD (2008, Violent Change records)

Compilations appearances

- Consolidation 7-inch 2000 copies made – Armed With Anger – 1992
- Illiterate 12-inch 2000 copies made – Ebullition – 1993
- All For One... One For All CD – Grand Theft Audio – 1995
- Endless Struggle: The Worst of the 1 in 12 Club vol. 12/13 2×12″ 2000 copies made – 1 in 12 Records – 1995
- The Boredom & the Bullshit 7-inch 1000 copies made – Refusenik – 1995
- Strictly Ballroom 7-inch 1000 copies made – Caught Offside – 1996
- A Means to an End 12-inch 2000 copies made – Armed With Anger – 1997
- Reproach 7-inch 5000 copies made – Ugly Pop – 1998
- Decade of Dissidence – Worst of the 1in12 Club Vol 14/15 CD 1000 copies made – 1 in 12 Records – 1999
- Hurt Your Feelings CD – Six Weeks – 2001
- Indecision Records Split Series CD – Indecision – 2001
- Off Target CD – Coalition – 2004
- The Bitter Days Ahead CD – Ghost City – 2005

== Members ==
Current

- Ian Leck – vocals (1991–2001, 2004, 2010, 2012–present)
- Sean Readman – guitar (1991–1996, 2004, 2010, 2012–present), bass (1991)
- Rob Bewick – bass (2016–present)
- Dave Allen – drums (1997–2001, 2012–2013, 2013–present)

Past

- David Brown – bass (1991)
- Darrell Hindley – guitar (1991–1993)
- Gary Cousins – drums (1991–1993)
- Michael Gillham – drums (1993–1996, 1997, 2004, 2010)
- Graeme Nicholls – guitar (1993–1996, 2004)
- Gareth Pugh – drums (1996–1997)
- Local Student Chris – drums (1997)
- Paul Rugman-Jones – bass (1991–1997)
- Andrew Wright – bass (1997; died 2009)
- Richard Armitage – guitar (1996–2001)
- James Atkinson – guitar (1996–2001), bass (1997)
- Steve Stewart – bass (1997–2001, 2004)
- Sam Layzell – bass (2010, 2012–2016)
- Jonny Payne – bass (2012)
- Steven Fletcher – drums (2013)
- Tom Chapman – guitar (2012–2018)
