= For Long Tomorrow =

Studio album by Toe
- Released: December 9, 2009
- Genre: Math rock; post-rock
- Length: 49:54
- Language: English, Japanese
- Label: MachuPicchu Industrias
- Producer: Toe

Toe chronology
The Book About My Idle Plot on a Vague Anxiety (2005)	For Long Tomorrow (2009)	Hear You (2015)

For Long Tomorrow is the second studio album by Japanese math rock band toe, released on December 9, 2009. It saw the band introduce new elements in their music, including the use of a Rhodes piano, acoustic guitars, and minor vocals.

== Critical reception ==
Shawn Despres from Japan Times writes in a review for the album "[w]ell worth the wait, For Long Tomorrow is a compelling listen that retains the phenomenally played, complex arrangements of its predecessor, but sees Toe expanding their sound to incorporate a much stronger postrock feel."

In an interview with Seattle Post-Intelligencer, Cadence Wu of Blogcritics says that although the album sounds similar to their debut, it "shows that they've matured musically" with the introduction of new elements like a Rhodes piano, acoustic guitars, and minor vocals, and a generally more experimental approach in their sound. Wu concludes saying "Toe's second album may sound at times like an extension of their debut, but the level of experimentation in For Long Tomorrow provides the light, upbeat sound the band was looking for".

== Track listing ==
No.	Title	Length
1.	"Everything is Here, it Can be Said That Nothing is Here, too." (ここには何もかもがあるし、何もかもがない Koko ni wa Nani mo Kamo ga Arushi, Nani mo Kamo ga Nai)	0:39
2.	"Vanishing Point and Whistle" (ショウシツ点よ笛 Shōshitsu Ten yo Fue)	2:39
3.	"After Image"	3:59
4.	"Esoteric" (エソテリック Esoterikku)	4:14
5.	"Say It Ain't So"	3:42
6.	"Two Moons"	4:10
7.	"Can't Hear Mosquitone Any More #1" (モスキートンはもう聞こえない #1 Mosukīton wa Mō Kikoenai #1)	2:31
8.	"Can't Hear Mosquitone Any More #2" (モスキートンはもう聞こえない #2 Mosukīton wa Mō Kikoenai #2)	2:19
9.	"Last Night" (ラストナイト Rasuto Naito)	4:56
10.	"Goodbye" (グッドバイ Guddobai)	7:05
11.	"You Go"	3:35
12.	"Our Next Movement"	4:47
13.	"Long Tomorrow"	5:18
Total length:		49:54
