= Trance Europe Experience =

Live album by Zeni Geva
- Released: 1994
- Recorded: Sep 1–Oct 13, 1994
- Length: 32:12
- Label: NUX Organization

Zeni Geva chronology
Alright You Little Bastards (with Steve Albini) (1993)	Trance Europe Experience (1994)	Freedom Bondage (1995)

Professional ratings
Review scores
Source	Rating
Allmusic	3/5 stars

Trance Europe Experience is a 1994 album by Zeni Geva.

== Track listing ==
1. "Death Blows" - 3:18
2. "Interzona" - 2:53
3. "Dead Sun Rising" - 3:04
4. "Desire For Agony" - 2:49
5. "Stigma" - 2:40
6. "Whiteout" - 5:31
7. "Love Bite" - 3:53
8. "Autopsy Love" - 3:31
9. "Autofuck" - 4:38

== Recording Credits ==
- Track 1-6 recorded by Ronal Trijber(NOB) at VPRO Audio-1 studio, Netherlands, Oct.13.1994
- Track 7-8 recorded live at DEMOCRAZY, Gent, Belgium, Sep.3.1994
- Track 9 recorded live at VERA, Groningen, Netherlands, Sep.1.1994
