= Lite (band) =

Japanese math rock band

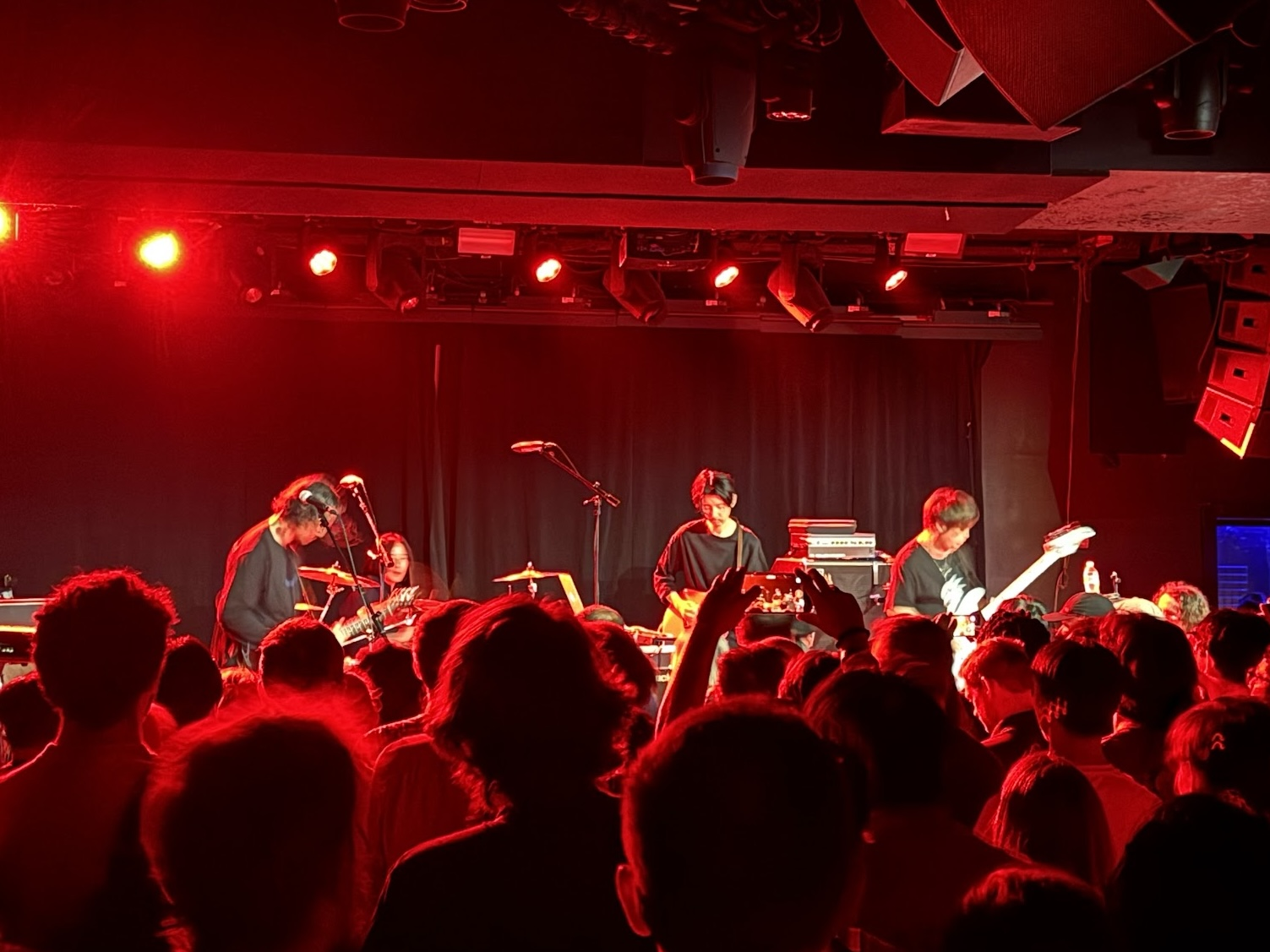
- LITE in 2026

Background information
- Origin: Tokyo, Japan
- Genres: Math rock, progressive rock, post-rock, funk
- Years active: 2003 - present
- Labels: I Want The Moon (Japan); Topshelf Records (North America); Blood and Biscuits (UK/Europe); Transduction Records (UK/Europe)
- Members: Nobuyuki Takeda (Guitar); Kozo Kusumoto (Guitar & Synthesizer); Jun Izawa (Bass); Akinori Yamamoto (Drums)

Lite, stylized as LITE, is a Japanese math rock band that has been termed "one of Japan's top instrumental rock acts." The band's members are Nobuyuki Takeda (guitar), Kozo Kusumoto (guitar & synthesizer), Jun Izawa (bass), and Akinori Yamamoto (drums).

== Biography ==
Formed in 2003 in Tokyo, LITE did many gigs around Tokyo and self-released two demo CDs. In 2006, they released one mini-album, LITE, and one full-length album, Filmlets, through Transduction in the UK and Cargo in Europe.

LITE's sound combines the precision and musicianship of prog rock with the emotionally charged cinematic compositions of art rock, in a heavier, more modern package that they describe as “math rock”.

LITE toured the UK and Ireland in 2006. In July 2007, they played at Fuji Rock Festival in Japan and followed that with another UK & Ireland tour in September, coinciding with a split release with Funanori (Kaori Tsuchida from The Go! Team and Mike Watt from the Minutemen). Titled "A Tiny Twofer", the split CD features three songs each. In 2008 they released their second album Phantasia. In May 2009, they made their American debut in New York City opening for Mike Watt's Missingmen.

LITE produced two EPs, Turns Red in 2009, and Illuminate in 2010, and third album For All the Innocence in 2011. Their mini-album Past, Present, Future was released in 2012.

LITE released their 4th album Installation in 2013 from Japan (I want The Moon) and the US (Topshelf Records). In 2015, the band released their US tour documentary DVD titled Past 7 Days (I want The Moon). In 2016, LITE and mouse on the keys released LITE / mouse on the keys split and they did the US tour from November 2016 and March 2017.

The band released their 5th album Cubic from Japan (I want The Moon) and the US (Topshelf Records). In 2018, LITE released their new single Blizzard from Japan (I want The Moon) and the US (Topshelf Records). In 2019, LITE released split 7 inch with Redneck Manifesto TRM・LITE from STIFFSLACK in Japan. The band released their 6th album Multiple from Japan (I want The Moon) and the US (Topshelf Records). In 2021, LITE released their 7th album Fraction.

== Members ==
- Nobuyuki Takeda (guitar)
- Kozo Kusumoto (guitar & synthesizer)
- Jun Izawa (bass)
- Akinori Yamamoto (drums)

== Discography ==
=== CDR releases ===
- 1st Demo CD (2003)
- 2nd Demo CD (2004)
- Lite Demo CD-R US West Coast Tour 2010 Limited (2010)

=== Albums ===
- Filmlets (2006)
- Phantasia (2008)
- For All The Innocence (2011)
- Installation (2013)
- Approaches IV (2015)
- Cubic (2016)
- Multiple (2019)
- STRATA (2024)

=== Live appearances ===
- Live in Limerick (2007)
- Live in New York (2009)
- Live in Los Angeles (2010)

=== EP ===
- LITE (2006)
- A Tiny Twofer (2007)
- Tuesday Sessions (2008)
- Turns Red (2009)
- Illuminate (2010)
- Past, Present, Future (2012)
- Split (2016)
- Strata (Preview) (2023)
- The Beyond (2025)

=== Singles ===
- Rabbit (2011)
- Arch (2012)
- Blizzard (2019)
- Crushing (2023)

=== DVDs ===
- Approaches (2011)
- Approaches 2 (2013)
- Approaches 4 (2015)
- Past 7 Days (2015)
