= Toe (band) =

Japanese rock band

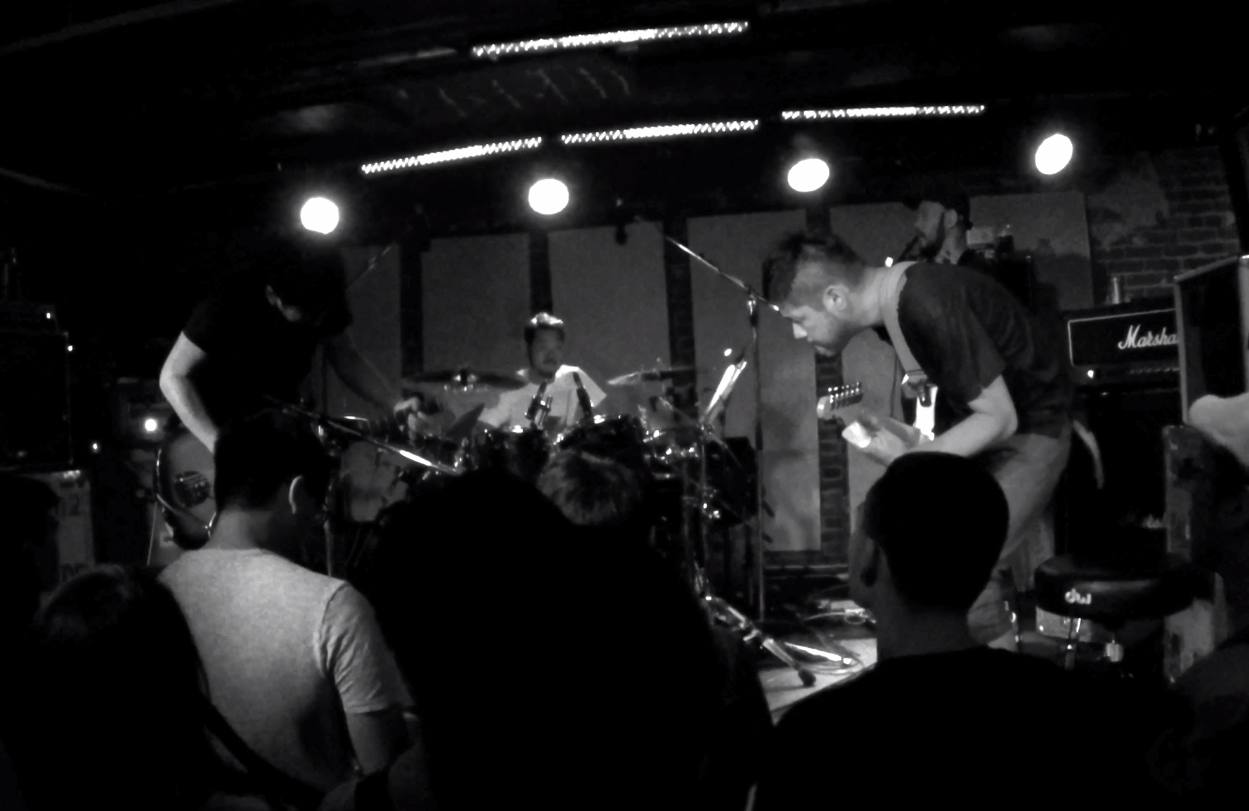
- Toe performing in Vancouver, British Columbia in July 2015

Background information
- Origin: Tokyo, Japan
- Genres: Post-rock; math rock
- Years active: 2000–present
- Labels: CATUNE; Machu Picchu; Topshelf; Big Scary Monsters
- Members: Hirokazu Yamazaki; Satoshi Yamane; Takaaki Mino; Takashi Kashikura
- Website: toe.st

Toe (トー, Tō), stylized as toe, is a Japanese post-rock/math rock band from Tokyo. toe stands for "theory of everything". The group was founded in 2000, and consists of Kashikura Takashi (drums), Mino Takaaki (guitar), Yamane Satoshi (bass guitar), and Yamazaki Hirokazu (guitar).

== History ==
Hirokazu Yamazaki and Satoshi Yamane were members of a screamo band, Dové, while Takashi Kashikura and Takaaki Mino were members of a rock band called Reach. In 2000, Yamazaki invited Mino to form a new band, since they had jammed together. The band began performing live in July 2001, released their first EP Songs, Ideas We Forgot a year later, and has toured ever since.

In 2005, they released their first studio album The Book About My Idle Plot on a Vague Anxiety through the label Catune. Soon after, they founded their own indie label Machu Picchu Industrias, alongside the bands Mouse on the Keys, Enemies, and Tangled Hair. In 2006, they released their first DVD (RGBDVD), followed by the EP New Sentimentality the following year.

In 2009, Toe released a split EP with the band Collections of Colonies of Bees, and in December 9 of the same year, they released their second studio album, For Long Tomorrow, which saw the band expand their sound using new elements like a Rhodes piano, acoustic guitars, and minor vocals. After the album tour, they released their second live DVD Cut_DVD in 2010.

In 2012, Toe released the EP The Future is Now, published by Topshelf Records in the US and Big Scary Monsters in the EU and UK. Subsequently, Topshelf Records re-released most of the band's catalog on vinyl. The group also released the DVD 8 Days EU Tour in 2012.

In 2015, the band released their third studio album Hear You, which was met with positive critical acclaim. It was characterized by its more minimal and vocally-focused sound in comparison with records, having some hip-hop influences as well.

In 2018, Toe released a compilation of non-album tracks and remixes titled That's Another Story, in January 24, and the studio EP Our Latest Number, in August 22. Doku en Kai was recorded live in the round at le Poisson Rouge in New York City in 2019, and it was released on March 6, 2021.

In 2021, they contributed an original song to the soundtrack for the anime series Sonny Boy.

In 2024, Toe released their fourth studio album, Now I See the Light.

== Members ==
- Hirokazu Yamazaki (山嵜廣和, Yamazaki Hirokazu) – guitar
- Satoshi Yamane (山根さとし, Yamane Satoshi) – bass
- Takaaki Mino (美濃隆章, Mino Takaaki) – guitar
- Takashi Kashikura (柏倉隆史, Kashikura Takashi) – drums

== Musical style ==
The majority of Toe's music is instrumental, featuring a very dynamic drumming blended in with melodic, clean guitars. Takashi's drumming has been especially revered among math-rock circles, considered to be the highlight of the band from their first releases. The AllMusic review for The Book About My Idle Plot on a Vague Anxiety calls the drums "the star of the sound". Lars Gotrich from NPR praises Takashi, deeming him "capable of Questlove-level precision and soul one moment, and a cyclone of controlled chaos the next", and explains that what makes toe different from other bands within the genre is their "ability to tell short, concise stories — ecstatic, noodly, complex pop songs that unfold in less than five minutes" Later records have incorporated acoustic guitars, Rhodes piano, vibraphones and vocals.

== Discography ==
Studio albums

- The Book About My Idle Plot on a Vague Anxiety (2005)
- For Long Tomorrow (2009)
- Hear You (2015)
- Now I See the Light (2024)

Live albums

- Doku en Kai (2021)

EPs

- Songs, Ideas We Forgot (2003)
- New Sentimentality (2006)
- New Sentimentality "Tour Edition" (2008) Enhanced CDEP Limited to 1000
- Toe/Collection of Colonies of Bees (2009)
- The Future Is Now (2012)
- Our Latest Number (2018)

Splits

- Pele / Toe (2002)

Remix albums

- Re:designed (2003)

Compilation albums

- That's Another Story (2018)

=== Live DVDs ===
- RGBDVD (2005)
- Cut_DVD (2010)
- 8 Days DVD (2012)
- Doku en Kai (2021)
