= Mouse on the Keys =

Japanese post-rock band

- Origin: Tokyo, Japan
- Genre: Post-rock
- Years active: 2007-present
- Labels: Machu Picchu Industries; Topshelf; Fractrec
- Members: Akira Kawasaki (drums); Daisuke Niitome (keyboards); Takumi Shiroeda (piano, keyboards)
- Past members: Atsushi Kiyota (keyboards)
- Website: mouseonthekeys.net

Mouse on the Keys (stylized as mouse on the keys) is a Japanese post-rock band from Tokyo.

== History ==
Mouse on the Keys began in 2007 with the release of an EP titled Sezession.

In 2009, they released their first full-length album titled An Anxious Object on Machu Picchu Industrias.

In 2011, Mouse on the Keys released DVD of the documentation of their tour in Europe, Irreversible. It was directed by Minoru Kubota.

In 2012, the band released an EP titled Machinic Phylum on Machu Picchu Industrias.

In 2015, the band released their second full-length album titled The Flowers of Romance on "Mule Musiq".

In 2016, the band released a split with Japanese math rock band Lite on "Topshelf Records". Mouse on the Keys also released a live album titled Live at Red Bull Studios Tokyo.

In 2017, Mouse on the Keys released an EP on "Topshelf Records" titled Out Of Body. Mouse on the Keys has alao composed music for the exhibition "TADAO ANDO : ENDEAVORS” at the National Art Center, Tokyo. The new music written for the installation is entitled The Beginnings / The Prophecy (TADAO ANDO : ENDEAVORS version).

Their third studio album titled Tres on "Topshelf Records" was released in 2018.

In February 2019, Mouse on the Keys released the single Circle. This track was recorded with guest musicians; Masahiro Tobita (guitar) and Yuri Kamo (guitar). The band also released another single, mind in August. Both tracks were released from their label fractrec.

Yuji Katsui (from ROVO) and Mouse on the Keys released the soundtrack album of NHK Special Drama ''Phone Fraud Children'' on October 2.

In 2020, Mouse on the Keys released a new EP titled Arche on "felicity / fractrec" and "Topshelf Records".

In 2021, Mouse on the Keys revealed that member Atsushi Kiyota (keys) will be leaving the group. The other two members, Akira Kawasaki (drums) and Daisuke Niitome (keys) will continue to play as mouse on the keys, and are planning to add a new member. Atsushi Kiyota will be playing music individually.

In 2022, Mouse on the Keys announced Takumi Shiroeda (Piano, Keyboards) as the new member of the band. The band did their first live concert in three years at Hiratsuka Hall in Japan and released limited new single CD titled "The Dawn".

== Band members ==
- Akira Kawasaki (drums)
- Daisuke Niitome (keyboards)
- Takumi Shiroeda (Piano, Keyboards)

Past Members

- Atsushi Kiyota (keyboards -- )

== Discography ==
=== Studio albums ===
- an anxious object (2009, Machu Picchu Industrias)
- The Flowers of Romance (2015, Mule Musiq)
- tres (2018, Topshelf)
- midnight (2024, fractrec)

=== EPs ===
- sezession (2007, Machu Picchu Industrias)
- machinic phylum (2012, Machu Picchu Industrias)
- Out of Body (2017, Topshelf)
- Arche (2020, Topshelf Records / felicity / fractrec)
- Portrait of Impulse (2026, fractrec)

=== Singles ===
- "The Beginnings" / "The Prophecy" - Digital (2017, fractrec)
- "Stars Down" - Digital / 7inch (2018, fractrec)
- "Circle" - Digital (2019, fractrec)
- "Mind" - Digital (2019, fractrec)
- "The Dawn" - Limited CD (2022, fractrec)

=== Splits ===
- Kowloon / Mouse On The Keys (2010)
- LITE / mouse on the keys Split (2016, Topshelf Records)

=== Live albums ===
- mouse on the keys and aku Live Session 2011/3/28 (2011)
- Live at the Red Bull Studios Tokyo (2016, self-released)

=== DVDs ===
- Irreversible (2011, Machu Picchu Industrias)

=== Soundtracks ===
- Yuji Katsui x mouse on the keys NHK Special Drama ''Phone Fraud Children'' Original Soundtrack (2019, SPACE SHOWER MUSIC)
