= Rollerball (band) =

- Origin: Gold Coast, Queensland, Australia
- Genre: Stoner rock
- Years active: 1998–present
- Labels: Waterdragon, Rhythm Ace, Plus One Records
- Members: Matt "Tenpin" Boland; Dave Talon; Stew "Boots" Maclennan; Cam "Cracker" Roach

Rollerball are an Australian stoner rock band formed in the Gold Coast, Queensland in 1998 and named after the 1975 film. They have released four full-length albums, SuperStructure, Oversize, Submarine and a European self-titled album which was a compilation based on their first two EPs.

== Discography ==
Albums

- Rollerball (2002) – Waterdragon
- SuperStructure (2002) – Rhythm Ace
- Oversize (2004) – Rhythm Ace
- Submarine (2009) – Plus One Records

EPs

- Lost in Space (1999) – Rhythm Ace
- Let Your Hair Hang Down (2000) – Rhythm Ace
- Broken Open (2005) -
- "My First Cowboy" (CD Split with OvO, Bar La Muerte/TMR)

Singles

- "Liftetime" – Rhythm Ace
- "Highly Likely" – Rhythm AceRhythm Ace
- "Common Thread"/"Broken Open"
