= Daniele Brusaschetto =

Italian songwriter and musician

- Born: 1973 (age 52–53); Turin, Italy
- Origin: Turin, Italy
- Genres: Songwriting, metal, rock, industrial music
- Occupations: Songwriter, musician, producer
- Years active: 1990–present
- Labels: WormHoleDeath; Wallace; Bar La Muerte; Bosco Rec

Daniele Brusaschetto (born 1973) is an Italian songwriter and musician.

He has been active as a soloist since the middle of the 1990s. The releases under his own name are characterized by the union of elements of rock, metal, soundscapes, electronics and an intimate writing.

== Early career ==
Brusaschetto started playing music at the end of the 80's, playing in thrash death metal bands.
At the beginning of the 90's his career became more structured, and he joined bands such as Mudcake (noise rock), Whip (industrial rock) and Down! (avantgarde improvisation).

== Solo Project ==
Daniele Brusaschetto emerged as an artist in 1994. His music has encompassed a wide range of genres, including industrial, noise rock, songwriting, and metal. During the 1990s and 2000s, he and his band were at the forefront of a vibrant live scene, embarking on numerous tours across Europe and even venturing to the United States. In the 2000s and 2010s, he experienced a period of electronic isolationism, characterized by fewer live performances. Since 2016, he has rekindled his passion for the six-string and extreme rock. In 2019, he released "Flying Stag," an album that signaled his return to the energetic sounds of metal, math, groove, and stoner rock. In 2023, he unveiled "Bruise A Shadow" on WormHoleDeath Records, solidifying a style reminiscent of early Mastodon, Voivod, and the new/no wave movements. Throughout the years, Brusaschetto's band has been joined by numerous artists from the Italian "alternative" scene, including Alberto "Mono" Marietta (Rope, Bull Brigade), Daniele Pagliero (Lo Dev Alm, Frammenti), Marco Rinaldi (Crunch, Omega Machine, Lama Tematica), Francesco Lurgo, Marco Milanesio (DsorDNE), Bruno Dorella (OvO, Ronin, Bachi Da Pietra), Marco "Il Bue" Schiavo (Larsen), and Mirco Rizzi (Ashtool).

=== Discography (selected) ===
==== Studio albums ====
- 1997 – Bellies/Pance
- 1999 – Mamma Fottimi
- 2001 – Bluviola
- 2003 – Poesia Totale Dei Muscoli
- 2005 – Mezza Luna Piena
- 2007 – Circonvoluzioni
- 2010 – Fragranze Silenzio
- 2012 – Cielo Inchiostro
- 2014 – Rapida E Indolore
- 2016 – Radio Stridentia
- 2019 – Flying Stag
- 2023 – Bruise A Shadow
- 2026 – Dichotomous

==== Singles ====
- 1996 – Paturnie

==== Live albums ====
- 2006 – Live at the Satyricon

== Additional musicians ==
- Alberto "Mono" Marietta – drums (2016–2026)
- Daniele Pagliero – bass (2020–2026)
- Marco Rinaldi – guitarbass (2019)
- Francesco Borello – bass (2017 - 2018)
- Francesco Lurgo – electronics, guitar (2014 - 2016)
- Marco Milanesio – electronics, keyboard (2014 - 2015)
- Paolo Inverni – guitar (2007 - 2008)
- Bruno Dorella – drums (2000 - 2003)
- Marco "Il Bue" Schiavo – drums (1999 - 2000)
- Maurizio Suppo – bass (1997)
- Mirco Rizzi – guitarbass (1996 - 2003)

== Bibliography ==
- Isabella Maria Zoppi (2008). Torino canzoni al Valentino, guida alla città e alle sue canzoni. Editrice Zona.
- Antonello Cresti (2015). Solchi Sperimentali Italia. 50 anni di italiche musiche altre. CRAC Edizioni.
- Dionisio Capuano (2016). Blow Up. Tuttle Edizioni.
- Dmitry Vasilyev (2017). Viva Italia. IEM.
- Mindaugas Peleckis (2018). Meetings With Friends. Camion Blanc.
- Diego Ballani (2020). Italia Sotterranea. Homework Edizioni.
