= Psychofagist =

Italian rock band

- Origin: Novara, Italy
- Genres: Grindcore; Mathcore; Avant-garde metal Free improvisation
- Years active: 2002–2013
- Members: Marcello Sarino; Stefano Ferrian; Federico de Bernardi di Valserra
- Past members: Luca T. Mai (also on Zu and Mombu), Luca Fiameni (Fiamma)
- Website: psychofagist.com

Psychofagist (pronounced sahy-kohf-uh-jist, from Ancient Greek element psykho- meaning "mind, mental" and Latin suffix -phagus or -fagus meaning "to eat") is a band originally formed in 2002 in Novara, Italy.

Their style can be described as an avant-garde grindcore which incorporates elements of noise music, technical death metal, punk jazz and free improvisation.

Psychofagist recorded two full-length studio albums, four split-CDs, one CD-EP and one 7"-EP.

Their debut was a split-CD with Belgian grindcore band Hybrid Viscery, entitled Selfless Spite (2003), while their first self-titled full-length album was released in 2004. It was followed by some split and EP releases, until the follower Il Secondo Tragico came out in December 2009. At the beginning of 2011 the band started to work on their latest release, a split-CD with polish industrial-grinders Antigama entitled 9 Psalms of an Anti-music to come, which was issued in January 2012, featuring a cover version of Tom Waits's "Misery Is the River of the World".

On 9 December 2013, the band announced through their Facebook page that the band was no longer active. Guitarist Stef and drummer Fed went on to form experimental metal band Syk with singer Dalila Kayros and bassist Luca Pissavini. The band has since released two albums, atoma (2014) and I-Optikon (2016) through Philip Anselmo's Housecore Records.

Over the years, Psychofagist have played about 140 shows, including international festivals, and shared the stage with acts such as Brutal Truth, Zu, Ephel Duath, Extreme Noise Terror, Damo Suzuki, Misery Index, and Fuck the Facts.

== Members ==
- Marcello Sarino – vocals and bass
- Stefano Ferrian – guitar
- Federico de Bernardi di Valserra – drums

Former members

- Luca T. Mai – baritone saxophone (2008, 2011)
- Luca Fiameni – drums (2003, 2007)

== Discography ==
- 2004 – Psychofagist (Subordinate Productions)
- 2009 – Il Secondo Tragico (Subordinate Productions)
- 2013 – Songs of Faint and Distortion (Fobofile Productions)

=== Split albums ===
- 2003 – Selfless Spite (Amputated Vein Records, con gli Hybrid Viscery)
- 2007 – A Bullet Sounds the Same (In Every Language) (Bar La Muerte, with OvO and Inferno)
- 2008 – Raiz Diabolica (NothingPositive Records, with Thousandswilldie)
- 2012 – 9 Psalms of an Antimusic to Come (Subordinate Productions, with Antigama)

=== EPs ===
- 2008 – Raiz Epileptica (Concubine Records)
- 2009 – The Optician (The Spew Records)
- 2012 – Unique.Negligible.Forms.
