= The Unloved Woman (1914 film) =

- Directed by: Ricardo de Baños
- Written by: Jacinto Benavente (play); Ricardo de Baños
- Cinematography: Ricardo de Baños
- Production company: Francisco y José Muntañola
- Release date: 1914
- Country: Spain
- Languages: Silent; Spanish intertitles

The Unloved Woman (Spanish:La malquerida) is a 1914 Spanish silent film directed by Ricardo de Baños. It is based on Jacinto Benavente's 1913 play of the same title.

== Cast ==
- Antonia Arévalo
- Francisco Fuentes hijo
- Francisco Fuentes
- Carmen Muñoz Gar

== Bibliography ==
- Bentley, Bernard. A Companion to Spanish Cinema. Boydell & Brewer 2008.
