= Charles Stover =

American football player and coach (1866–1927)

Biographical details
- Born: July 9, 1866; Brooklyn, New York, U.S.
- Died: May 5, 1927 (aged 60); Lowell, Massachusetts, U.S.

Playing career
- 1887–1890: Tufts

Coaching career (HC unless noted)
- 1890: Tufts

Head coaching record
- Overall: 2–3

Charles Livingston Stover (July 9, 1866 – May 5, 1927) was an American college football player and coach. He served as a player-coach at Tufts University in 1890, compiling a record of 2–3. He graduated from Tufts in 1891.

== Head coaching record ==
Year	Team	Overall	Conference	Standing	Bowl/playoffs
Tufts Jumbos (Independent) (1890)
1890	Tufts	2–3			
Tufts:		2–3			
Total:		2–3			
