= Asako Toki =

- 土岐 麻子
- Born: March 22, 1976 (age 50); Tokyo, Japan
- Occupation: Singer · songwriter
- Years active: 1997-present
- Musical career
- Genres: J-pop; rock; Shibuya-kei; jazz; city pop
- Labels: Pacific Records (2004–2007); Rhythm Zone (2007–2018); A.S.A.B (2019–present)
- Website: https://www.tokiasako.com/

Asako Toki (土岐麻子, Toki Asako; born March 22, 1976) is a Japanese singer-songwriter and lyricist. Born to jazz saxophonist Hidefumi Toki, she was the lead vocalist for the rock band Cymbals between 1997 and 2003. Following Cymbals' breakup, Toki began her solo career with the release of Standards in 2004 and made her major label debut under Avex's Rhythm Zone with Talkin in 2007. To date, she has released nine original albums and eight cover albums, many of which are performed in both Japanese and English.

Named the “Queen of City Pop” by publications including Natalie, Toki has been praised for her contemporary interpretation of the genre and her contributions to its revival in the 2010s.

== Career ==
On February 25, 2004, Toki released her first solo album Standards which was co-produced by her father. It contained covers of songs such as Rodger & Hammerstein's "My Favourite Things" and Earth, Wind and Fire's "September". Her first original album Debut, was released on September 7, 2004 and failed to chart. Additional cover albums Standards on the Sofa and Standards Gift were released on November 10, 2004 and November 9, 2005, respectively.

Following the release of her cover album Weekend Shuffle on December 12, 2006 and its remix album the following week, Toki moved to Avex's Rhythm Zone label. Her first album on the label; Talkin, was released November 21, 2007 to better commercial performance. On January 14, 2009, Toki released her third original album Touch. The album was her first to enter the top 50 on the Oricon Weekly Albums Chart, peaking at no. 33. In October, Toki began hosting Toki Chic Radio on JFN.

Throughout the early 2010s, Toki continued to release a mix of original and cover albums including Ranhansha Girl on May 25, 2010, Cassetteful Days on October 10, 2012, Heartbreakin' on June 12, 2013, and Bittersweet on July 29, 2015.

On January 25, 2017, Toki released Pink, which was followed by Safari and Passion Blue on May 30, 2018 and October 2, 2019 respectively. The albums were produced by Tomi Yo, who had previously worked with Toki on Heartbreakin' and Bittersweet. In promotional materials for Passion Blue, the albums were referred to by Toki as the "City Pop Trilogy" A remix album of songs from Pink and Safari with collaborators including Tofubeats and Wonk was released on June 26, 2019.

On July 3, 2020 Toki announced the digital single "Home" as the opening theme for Fruits Basket's second season. The single was released on July 7. It was also announced that Toki wrote the song "Pineapple" for boy band V6, released September 20.

Home Town, Toki's ninth cover album, was released on February 17, 2021 and included "Home" as a bonus track. The album was preceded by three singles; "Ai", "Jubilee" and "Kaede".

== Personal life ==
Toki announced her marriage to a recording engineer through social media on January 12, 2016. The two met during the production of her 2015 album Bittersweet.

== Discography ==
=== Albums ===
==== Studio albums ====
| Year | Title | JPN Oricon | |
| Year | Title | Peak | Weeks |
|---|---|---|---|
| 2004 | Debut | — | — |
| 2007 | Talkin' | 79 | 2 |
| 2009 | Touch | 33 | 5 |
| 2010 | Ranhansha Girl | 32 | 4 |
| 2013 | Heartbreakin' | 23 | 5 |
| 2015 | Bittersweet | 28 | 5 |
| 2017 | Pink | 31 | 5 |
| 2018 | Safari | 29 | 4 |
| 2019 | Passion Blue | 39 | 4 |
| 2021 | Twilight | 68 | 3 |
| 2024 | Lonely Ghost | | |
"—" denotes items which failed to chart.

==== Cover albums ====
| Year | Title | JPN Oricon | |
| Year | Title | Peak | Weeks |
|---|---|---|---|
| 2004 | Standards | — | — |
| 2004 | Standards on the Sofa | — | — |
| 2005 | Standards Gift | 154 | 2 |
| 2006 | Weekend Shuffle | 87 | 6 |
| 2008 | Summerin' | 90 | 4 |
| 2012 | Cassetteful Days ~ Japanese Pops Covers ~ | 70 | 3 |
| 2014 | Standards in a Sentimental Mood | 55 | 2 |
| 2021 | Home Town ~ Cover Songs ~ | 58 | 3 |
"—" denotes items which failed to chart.

==== Live albums ====
| Year | Title | JPN Oricon | |
| Year | Title | Peak | Weeks |
|---|---|---|---|
| 2005 | Live at Village Vanguard | — | — |
"—" denotes items which failed to chart.

==== Remix albums ====
| Year | Title | JPN Oricon | |
| Year | Title | Peak | Weeks |
|---|---|---|---|
| 2007 | Toki Asako Remixes Weekend Shuffle | 249 | 1 |
| 2012 | Coleur Cafe Meets Toki Asako Standards | 197 | 1 |
| 2019 | Toki Chic Remix | 164 | 1 |

==== Compilation albums ====
| Year | Title | JPN Oricon | |
| Year | Title | Peak | Weeks |
|---|---|---|---|
| 2009 | Middle and Mellow of Asako Toki | 166 | 1 |
| 2009 | Voice ~ Works Best ~ | 105 | 2 |
| 2011 | Best! 2004-2011 | 89 | 2 |
| 2011 | Toki Asako "Light" ~ CM & Cover Songs ~ | 29 | 6 |
| 2017 | Highlight - The Very Best of Toki Asako - | 57 | 3 |
| 2024 | Peppermint Time ～20th Anniversary Best～ | 34 | 3 |

=== Extended plays ===
| Year | Title | JPN Oricon | |
| Year | Title | Peak | Weeks |
|---|---|---|---|
| 2011 | Sings the Stories of 6 Girls | 82 | 2 |

=== Singles ===
| Year | Title | JPN Oricon | | Album |
| Year | Title | Peak | Weeks | Album |
|---|---|---|---|---|
| 2004 | Love's Theme | — | — | — |
| 2004 | Sekai wa Itsumo Dokoka ga Asa (世界はいつも何処かが朝) | — | — | — |
| 2008 | How Beautiful | 43 | 3 | Toki Asako "Light" |
| 2011 | Gift ~ Anata wa Madonna ~ (Gift ～あなたはマドンナ～) | 24 | 5 | Sings the Story of 6 Girls |
| 2011 | Mr. Summertime | — | — | Sings the Story of 6 Girls |
| 2012 | Season in the Sun (シーズン・イン・ザ・サン) | — | — | Cassetteful Days |
| 2012 | Hello, My Friend | — | — | Cassetteful Days |
| 2018 | SUNNY SIDE (Wonk Remix) | — | — | Toki Chic Remix |
| 2018 | PINK (Tofubeats Remix) | — | — | Toki Chic Remix |
| 2019 | Blue Moon (Yoshinori Sunahara Remix) | — | — | Toki Chic Remix |
| 2019 | Black Savanna (Kan Sano Remix) | — | — | Toki Chic Remix |
| 2019 | Picture Frame | — | — | — |
| 2020 | Boy from Setagaya (Passion Blue~ Reisei-Yori no Jōnetsu Tour at Space Odd 2020.02.04) (BOYフロム世田谷(PASSION BLUE ～冷静寄りの情熱ツアー at SPACE ODD 2020.02.04)) | — | — | — |
| 2020 | Home | — | — | Home Town |
| 2020 | Ai (アイ) | — | — | Home Town |
| 2021 | Jubilee | — | — | Home Town |
| 2021 | Kaede (楓) | — | — | Home Town |
"—" denotes items which failed to chart.

=== Guest appearances ===
| Year | Title | Other Artist(s) | Album |
|---|---|---|---|
| 2008 | Time After Time | Low IQ 01 | Jenny Special Collection~New Style Of '80s Hits |
| 2008 | Come Together | None | Cappuchino Due |
| 2008 | Island Moon~Groove Love~ | None | Island Moon~Groove Love~ |
| 2008 | Close To You | None | Island Moon~Groove Love~ |
| 2008 | The Goonies 'R' Good Enough | None | We Love Cyndi-Tribute to Cyndi Lauper- |
| 2008 | The Way You Look Tonight | Taku & Goro | Radio Indigo |
| 2008 | Aliens (エイリアンズ) | Gen Tamura | Lovers Covers Sweet |
| 2008 | Kizu Darake no Magokoro (傷だらけの真心) | Magokoro Brothers | Oretachi wa Magokoroda! (俺たちは真心だ!) |
| 2008 | Cabbage UFO (キャベツUFO) | None | Kazoku Jikan ~NHK Minna no Uta Cover Shu~ (家族時間～NHKみんなのうたカバー集～) |
| 2009 | 1989 | Nona Reeves | Go! |
| 2009 | What's New Pussycat | None | Amalka no Komori Uta (アマールカの子守唄) |
| 2009 | Magic Moments | None | Yuki to Hana no Komori Uta-Bacarach Lullaby Shū- (雪と花の子守唄 -バカラック・ララバイ集) |
| 2009 | Tonari no Totoro (となりのトトロ) | Takeshi Nakatsuka | Ghibli meets Bossa Nova (ジブリ meets Bossa Nova) |
| 2009 | Universe Song | None | Covers FreeTempo Covered Album |
| 2009 | Goodbye (グッドバイ) | Toe | For Long Tomorrow |
| 2010 | Room 305 | Dorlis | Swingin' Street 4 |
| 2010 | Summer Butterflies | Kazusa | Kimi to Deatta Sonohi Kara (きみと出会った その日から) |
| 2010 | Crystal Girl | Cro-Magnon | Joints |
| 2010 | Sunday | Tokyo No.1 Soul Set | Subete Hikari (全て光) |
| 2010 | What's New Pussycat | None | Amalka Book ~Larabai Hen~ (アマールカブック～ララバイ編～) |
| 2011 | Blue Blue Blue | Triadic | Triadic |
| 2011 | Moody's Mood | Juju | Delicious |
| 2011 | 2011 no Sora to Ongaku (2011の空と音楽) | None | Katamari Damacy Novita Original Soundtrack: Katamori Damacy (塊魂ノ･ビ～タ オリジナルサウンドトラック 「かたもりだましい」) |
| 2012 | Little Prayer | Wac | Ongaku (音楽) |
| 2012 | Sir Duke | None | Honey Sunday |
| 2012 | Shinkai no Ritorukurai (深海のリトルクライ) | Sasakure.UK | Maboroshi Jitsu Aesop (幻実アイソーポス) |
| 2012 | Over the Rainbow | None | Tokyo Cafe Freak-Jazz Flavor |
| 2012 | Sweet na Mecco ~Nameko no Chīsana Koi Monogatari~ (sweet na mecco ～なめ子の小さな恋物語～) | None | Nameko no CD (なめこのCD) |
| 2012 | Queen of Quiet | Cro-Magnon, Hyouge Mono | Otsu (乙) |
| 2012 | Tsunagaru Mirai ~Vocal Version~ (つながる未来 ～ボーカル・バージョン～) | None | Gekijō-Ban Tokyo Skytree Sekaiichi no Himitsu -Original Soundtrack- (劇場版 東京スカイツリー 世界一のひみつ -オリジナルサウンドトラック-) |
| 2012 | Slow Motion | Quasimode | Soul cookin' |
| 2012 | Taka no Shima ~Nan Fujiyūnai~ (鷹の島 ～何不自由ない～) | Takanotsumedan, I-Dep | Himetsu Kessa Taka no Tsume (秘密結社 鷹の爪) |
| 2014 | Kuroneko Tango (黒ネコのタンゴ) | Ryōta Komatsu | Kids Jazz CD (きっずじゃずCD ) |
| 2014 | Tell Her About It | None | We Love Piano Man: Tribute To Billy Joel |
| 2014 | Madoka (まど) | Told | Early Morning |
| 2014 | Baby's Star Jam | Schroder-Headz | Live -Synesthesia- |
| 2015 | Love Vacances | MiKa Beyond Jazz | Woman's Liberation |
| 2015 | Four Wishes | None | Woman's Liberation |
| 2015 | How Beautiful | Yu Sakai | Jasmine (ジャスミン) |
| 2017 | All Around The World | G. Rina | Live & Learn |
| 2019 | Kenuri no Lady (煙のLADY) | Yu Sakai | Yu Are Something |
| 2019 | Kyōnin Girl ~Far Eastern Tale~ (杏仁ガール～Far Eastern Tale～) | Schroder-Headz | Guest Suite |
| 2020 | Welcome to my Room | DJ Hasabe, Ryohu | Wonderful Tomorrow |
| 2020 | Ping-Pong | Tomoyo Harada | Renai Shōsetsu 3 ~You & Me (恋愛小説3～You & Me) |
| 2021 | Hitokuchi Ikaga? (ひとくちいかが?) | Maaya Sakamoto | Duets |
| 2025 | Goodbye (グッドバイ) | Toe, Seigen Tokuzawa | Goodbye - From THE FIRST TAKE - Single |
