= Shove =

Shove may refer to:

- Edith Shove (1848–1929), English medical doctor
- Elizabeth Shove (born 1959), British sociologist
- Fredegond Shove (1889–1949), English poet
- Gerald Shove (1887–1947), British economist
- Lawrence Shove (1923–1995), English wildlife sound recordist
- Ralph Shove (1889–1966), British County Court judge, rower who competed in the 1920 Summer Olympics
- Rosamund Flora Shove (1878–1954), English botanist

== See also ==
- Shove (song), song by L7
- Shovel
