= We Are the Music Makers (band) =

American new prog band

We Are the Music Makers is a new prog quartet from Brooklyn, New York founded by Adam Castro and Michael Calabrese in 2005. Their name was derived from a line of the poem "Ode" by Arthur O'Shaughnessy. Their music draws from many different genres, including funk, rock, blues, jazz, and metal. Their initial incarnation was a trio consisting of Adam Castro on bass, Mike Chierchio on drums, and Mike Calabrese on guitar and vocals. They frequently played shows at Third Rail, a venue which Chierchio owned and operated in Bensonhurst, Brooklyn. After signing with Texas' Galvatraz Records in 2006 and changing their lineup (replacing Chierchio with percussionist and producer Russ Mitkowski, and adding another guitarist, Phillip Salvagione), they released their debut album, Ecumenopolis. The band toured southern states of the U.S. in 2007 with now defunct fellow Brooklyn band And This Army. After a hiatus of seven years, the original members reunited in June 2013.

== Members ==
- Michael Calabrese - guitar/vocals (2005–2007, 2013–present)
- Adam Castro - bass guitar (2005–2007, 2013–present)
- Michael Chierchio - drums (2005–2006, 2013–present)
- Russ Mitkowski - drums (2006–2007)
- Phillip Salvagione - guitar (2006–2007)

== Discography ==
Full Length

- We Are the Music Makers (Self-released, 2005)
- Ecumenopolis (GVR-409, Galvatraz Records, 2006)

Other Releases

- I Had Some Dreams, But Then I Forgot EP (2005)
- Ecumenopolis EP (2006)
