= Unloved (album) =

Studio album by Frontierer
- Released: 27 July 2018
- Studios: Outlier Sound in Edinburgh, Scotland
- Genres: Mathcore; extreme metal
- Length: 60:49
- Producer: Pedram Valiani

Frontierer chronology
Orange Mathematics (2015)	Unloved (2018)	Oxidized (2021)

Unloved is the second studio album by Scottish band Frontierer. On 27 July 2018, it was released independently through the group's Bandcamp account. The album drew critical attention for its harshness and unrelenting tone. Unloved was preceded by the digital singles titled, "Tumoric" and "Glitcher" in May and June respectively.

== Critical reception ==
Professional ratings
Review scores
Source	Rating
Metal Storm	8.3/10
New-Transcendence	9.5/10
The Music	4.5/5 stars

Joe Smith-Engelhardt of Exclaim! praised Unloved's aggression and "masterfully" executed breakdowns, writing, "If you're a fan of brutal beatdown riffs and demented experimental metal with a hardcore touch, Unloved is a necessary listen". Rolling Stone's Christopher R. Weingarten also lauded the album's unrelenting harshness, describing it positively as "a hailstorm where time-signature confusion meets shrill noise-rock affects". Metal Storm wrote that the aggression of the album was admirable, but criticized the running time for being too long and ultimately, unsustainable. Daniel Cordova of Metal Injection wrote, "This album is nothing but breakdowns and chaos. It features some of the most fascinating and abrasive sounds I've heard on a record in a long, long time. The sounds on this hurt my brain almost as much as the band's name hurts my mouth to say."

=== Accolades ===
Year	Publication	Accolade	Rank	Ref.
2018	Exclaim!	"Exclaim!'s Top 10 Metal and Hardcore Albums"	8	
2018	Rolling Stone	"20 Best Metal Albums of 2018"	17	

== Track listing ==
All music written, composed, and produced by Frontierer

No.	Title	Length
1.	"Tumoric"	3:31
2.	"Gower St."	4:31
3.	"Fluorescent Nights"	4:30
4.	"Designer Chemtrails"	3:45
5.	"Glitcher"	3:54
6.	"Heartless 101"	5:24
7.	"The Destruction Artist"	3:15
8.	"Unloved & Oxidized"	5:34
9.	"Bombgnasher"	4:09
10.	"Electric Gag"	3:48
11.	"The Sound of the Dredge in Deathcount Woods"	3:22
12.	"Neon Barnacle"	3:46
13.	"Darkside Moonstroll"	3:42
14.	"Reprogrammed Dawn"	2:58
Total length:		56:23

Bonus track
No.	Title	Length
15.	"The Molten Larva"	4:26
Total length:		60:49

== Personnel ==
Credits adapted from Unloved liner notes

Frontierer

- Pedram Valiani – guitars, production, writing, recording, mixing
- Chad Kapper – vocals
- Owen Hughes – drums
- Dan Stevenson – guitars
- Calum Craig – bass

Additional personnel

- Brad Boatright – mastering
- Meld – design
- Justine Jones – additional performance (track 15)
- Sammy Urwin – additional performance (track 15)
- Michael Dafferner – additional performance (track 6)
- Greg Kubacki – additional performance (track 6)
