= Math rock =

Style of rock music

- Stylistic origins: Progressive rock; indie rock; post-hardcore; minimal; noise rock
- Cultural origins: Late 1980s, United States and Japan
- Derivative forms: Mathcore; midwest emo; post-rock

Other topics
- Experimental rock; jazz fusion

Math rock is a style of alternative and indie rock with roots in bands such as King Crimson, Yes, and Rush. It is characterized by complex, atypical rhythmic structures (including irregular stopping and starting), counterpoint, odd time signatures, and extended chords. Math rock has been classified as a derivative or subgenre of experimental rock, sharing its avant-garde ethos and emphasis on through-composed structure rather than traditional song forms. The genre has additionally been described as bearing similarities to post-rock, as the "opposite side of the same coin". Opting for a "rockier" approach to songwriting and timbres, the style is often performed by smaller ensembles which emphasize the role of the guitar.

== History and precursors ==
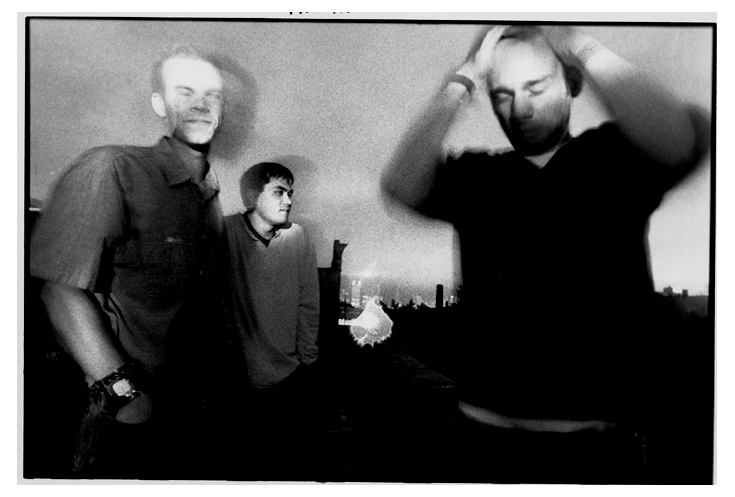
Bastro, a pioneering math rock band

The albums Red and Discipline by King Crimson, as well as Spiderland by Slint, are generally considered seminal influences on the development of math rock. The Canadian punk rock group Nomeansno have been cited by music critics as a "secret influence" on math rock, being formed in 1979 and predating much of the genre's development by more than a decade. The American group Massacre, an even more avant-garde group of the same era, featured the guitarist Fred Frith and the bassist Bill Laswell. With some influence from the rapid-fire energy of punk, Massacre's influential music used complex rhythmic characteristics. Black Flag's 1984 album, My War, also included unusual polyrhythms.

Two songs on Yes' album Fragile (1971) have drawn attention – Paul Lester of Classic Rock writes that "Five Per Cent for Nothing" finds drummer Bill Bruford "inventing math rock", while "Heart of the Sunrise" was described by Pitchfork's Chris Dahlen, Dominique Leone and Joe Tangari as "a deftly constructed proto math-rock epic".

Polvo, Don Caballero, Slint, Bitch Magnet, Bastro and Ruins are the genre's pioneers.

Examples of modern math rock bands include Delta Sleep, Covet, Tricot, and TTNG.

== Characteristics ==
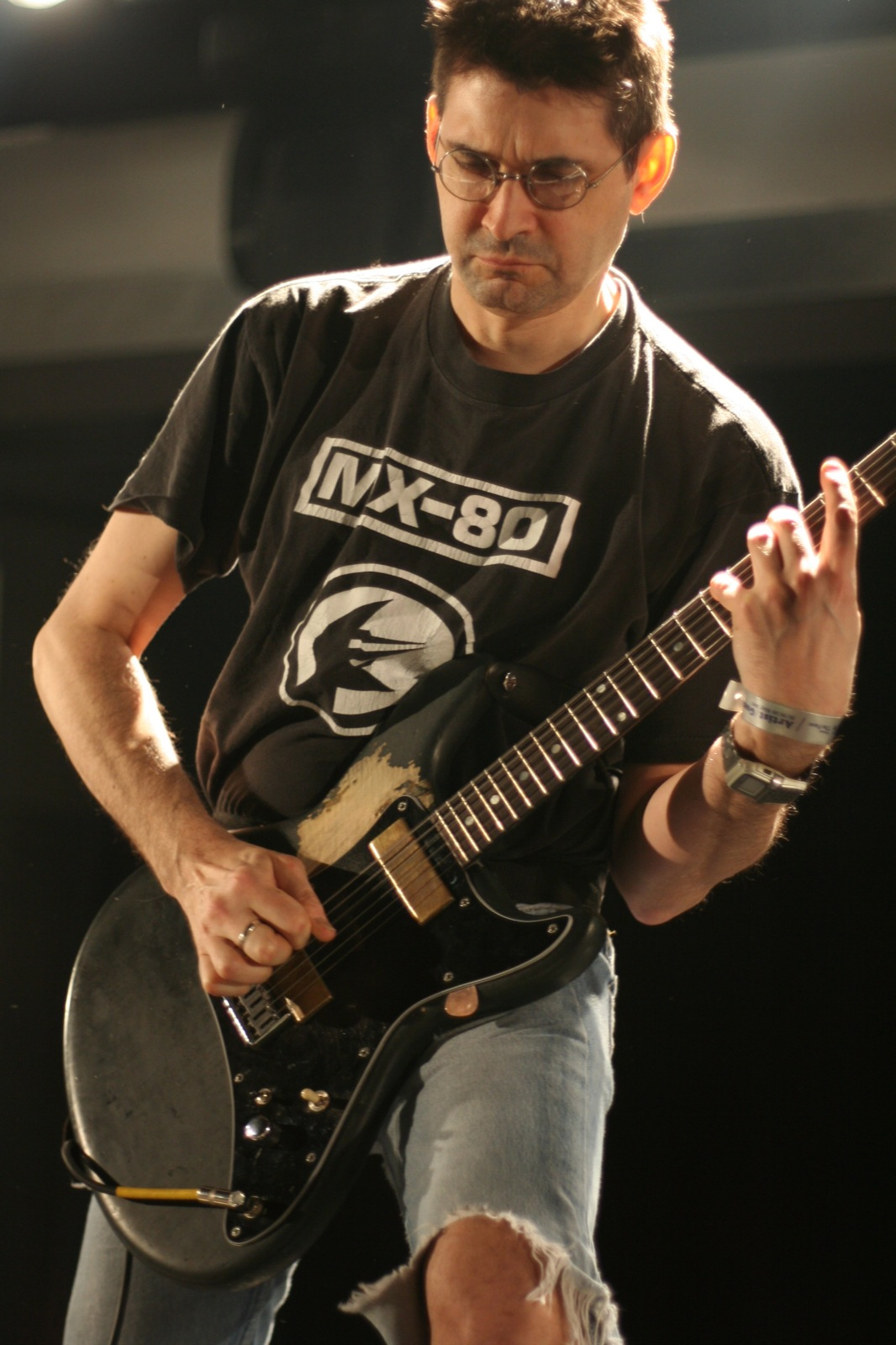
Steve Albini was an influence in the math rock genre.

Math rock is typified by its rhythmic complexity, seen as mathematical in character by listeners and critics. While most rock music uses a 4/4 meter (however accented or syncopated), math rock makes use of more non-standard, frequently changing time signatures such as 5/4, 7/8, 11/8, or 13/8.

As in traditional rock, the sound is most often dominated by guitars and drums. However, drums play a greater role in math rock in providing driving, complex rhythms. Math rock guitarists make use of tapping techniques and loop pedals to build on these rhythms, as illustrated by songs like those of math rock supergroup Battles.

Lyrics are generally not the focus of math rock; the voice is treated as just another instrument in the mix. Often, vocals are not overdubbed, and are positioned less prominently, as in the recording style of Steve Albini. Many of math rock's best-known groups are entirely instrumental such as Don Caballero or Hella.

A significant intersection exists between math rock and emo, exemplified by bands such as Tiny Moving Parts or American Football, whose sound has been described as "twinkly, mathy rock, a sound that became one of the defining traits of the emo scene throughout the 2000s".

== Etymology ==
The term began as a joke but has since developed into the accepted name for the musical style. According to Matt Sweeney, singer with Chavez, the term started because his friend would not react at all while listening to his music, then proceed to take a calculator out to figure out how good the song was. Not all critics see math rock as a serious sub-genre of rock, and some of the genre's most notable acts have disavowed the term.

== Artists ==
=== Asian ===
Math rock has a significant presence in Japan; the most prominent Japanese groups include Toe, Tricot, The Cabs, and Lite. Other Japanese groups which incorporate math rock in their music include Ling Tosite Sigure, Zazen Boys and Mouse on the Keys while the Japanoise scene features bands such as Ruins, Zeni Geva, and Boredoms.

Taiwan has a very small indie music scene, of which math rock is an emergent genre that is quickly gaining in popularity, with well-known math rock bands including Elephant Gym.

Math rock also has a presence in South Korea, led by bands such as Cotoba and Dabda.

=== North American ===
Polvo of Chapel Hill, North Carolina is often considered one of the household names in math rock, although the band members themselves have disavowed the categorization.

In California, power pop groups Game Theory and the Loud Family were both led by Scott Miller, who was said to "tinker with pop the way a born mathematician tinkers with numbers". The origin of Game Theory's name is mathematical, suggesting a "nearly mathy" sound cited as "IQ rock."

Although the Seattle grunge scene was not widely associated with math rock, some consider Soundgarden to be one of few exceptions, due to the odd time signatures found in many of their songs.

== See also ==
- List of math rock groups
- List of mathcore bands
- List of musical works in unusual time signatures
- Mathcore
- Music and mathematics
- Noise rock
- Post-hardcore
- Progressive metal
