= KK Null =

Japanese musician

KK Null 岸野一之
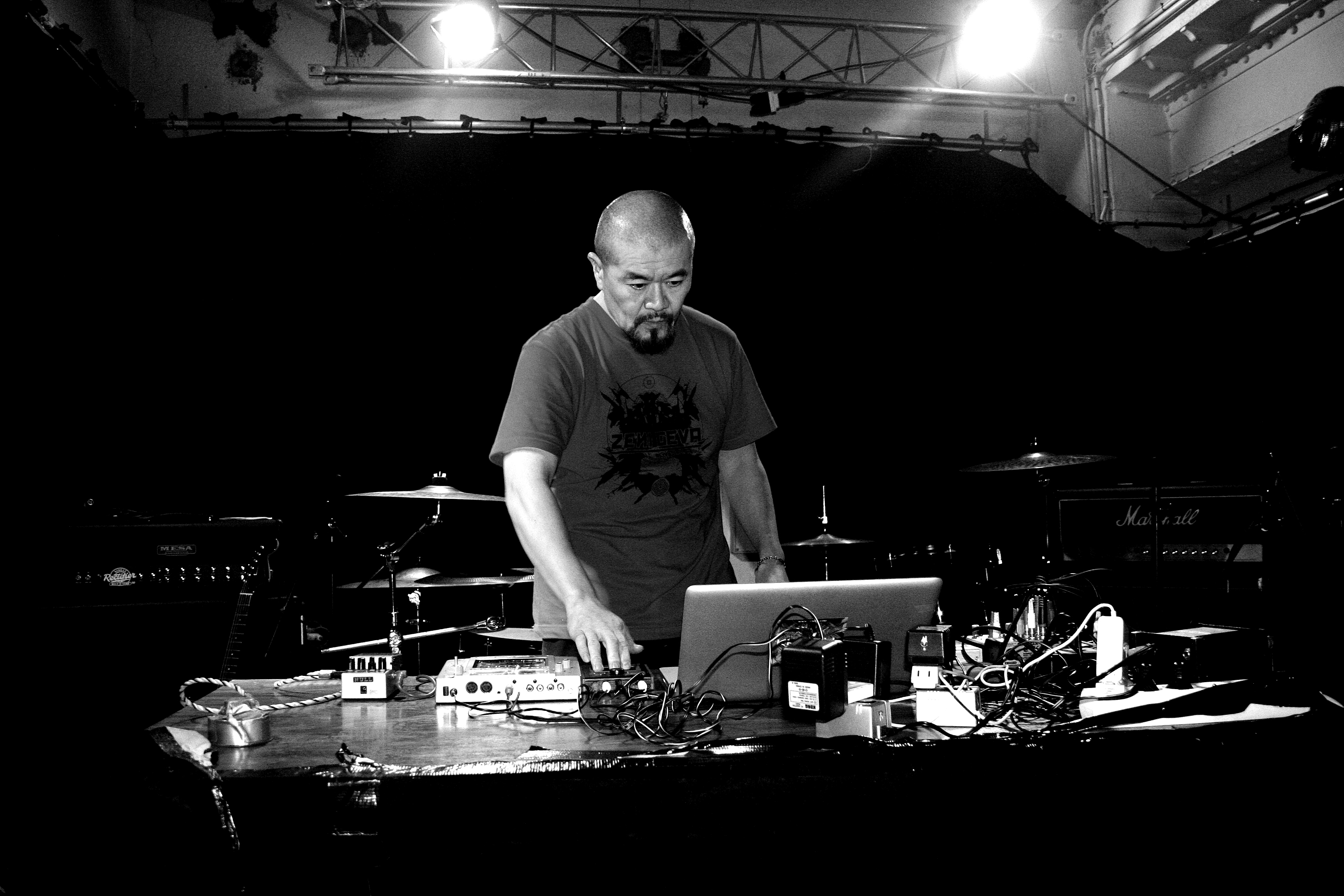
- KK Null performing in November 2010

Background information
- Birth name: Kazuyuki Kishino
- Also known as: Kazuyuki K. Null
- Born: September 13, 1961 (age 63); Tokyo, Japan
- Genres: Noise, noise rock
- Occupation(s): Musician, composer
- Instrument(s): Guitar, electronics
- Labels: Nux Organization, Table of the Elements
- Website: http://www.kknull.com/

Kazuyuki Kishino (岸野 一之, Kishino Kazuyuki, born September 13, 1961 in Tokyo), known by his stage name KK Null, is a Japanese experimental multi-instrumentalist active since the early 1980s. He began as a guitarist but learned how to compose, sing, play drums, and create electronic music. He also studied Butoh dance at Min Tanaka's workshop.

KK Null joined the noise / progressive rock band YBO2 in 1984, issuing several albums and EPs throughout the remainder of the decade. Later he founded bands, such as Absolut Null Punkt (a.k.a. ANP) and the most well known, a self-described "progressive hardcore trio", Zeni Geva. From that point he also produced albums for other artists, created his own record label (Nux Organization), played live and collaborated on albums with many other musicians, including John Zorn, Yona-Kit, Steve Albini, Boredoms, Seiichi Yamamoto, Jim O'Rourke, Merzbow, Fred Frith, James Plotkin, Keiji Haino, Otomo Yoshihide, Jon Rose, Damian Catera, OvO, Atau Tanaka, Zbigniew Karkowski, Z'EV, Alexei Borisov, Earth, Cris X., Noisegate and Philip Samartzis, as well as supporting such artists as Sonic Youth and Mike Patton on tour. Altogether KK Null has released more than 100 albums. In 2004 he restarted ANP and in 2006 they released their first studio album in 20 years.
