= Recuerda (album) =

Compilation album by Dazzling Killmen
- Released: July 9, 1996
- Genre: Noise rock, post-hardcore, math rock
- Length: 76:00
- Label: Skin Graft
- Producer: Steve Albini, Jack Petracek, Jeff Tweedy

Dazzling Killmen chronology
Face of Collapse (1994)	Recuerda (1996)

Professional ratings
Review scores
Source	Rating
Allmusic	3/5 stars
Alternative Press	5/5 stars

Recuerda is a compilation album by Dazzling Killmen, released on July 9, 1996 through Skin Graft Records.

== Track listing ==
All tracks are written by Dazzling Killmen.

No.	Title	Length
1.	"Medicine Me"	2:39
2.	"My Lacerations"	1:25
3.	"Poptones"	4:01
4.	"Bottom Feeder" (reprise)	0:47
5.	"Serpentarium"	2:38
6.	"Dig Out the Hole"	2:15
7.	"Here Comes Mr. Big Face"	3:13
8.	"Spiral Mirror"	1:59
9.	"No"	2:07
10.	"Premonition"	1:07
11.	"Torture"	3:27
12.	"Numb"	3:31
13.	"Code Blue"	12:10
14.	"******"	3:44
15.	"Ghost Limb"	5:42
16.	"Torture"	3:54
17.	"Killing Fever"	4:18
18.	"Numb"	4:07
19.	"Bottom Feeder"	6:17
20.	"Closet Creep"	6:56

== Personnel ==
Dazzling Killmen

- Blake Fleming – drums
- Tim Garrigan – guitar
- Darin Gray – bass guitar
- Nick Sakes – guitar, vocals

Production and additional personnel

- Steve Albini – production
- Dennis Carter – saxophone on "Ghost Limb"
- Cub Scout Troop 56389 – vocals on "******"
- Jack Petracek – production
- Casey Rice – mixing
- David Wm. Sims – engineering
- Jeff Tweedy – production, guitar on "Killing Fever"
