= Eric Paul =

American singer (born 1974)

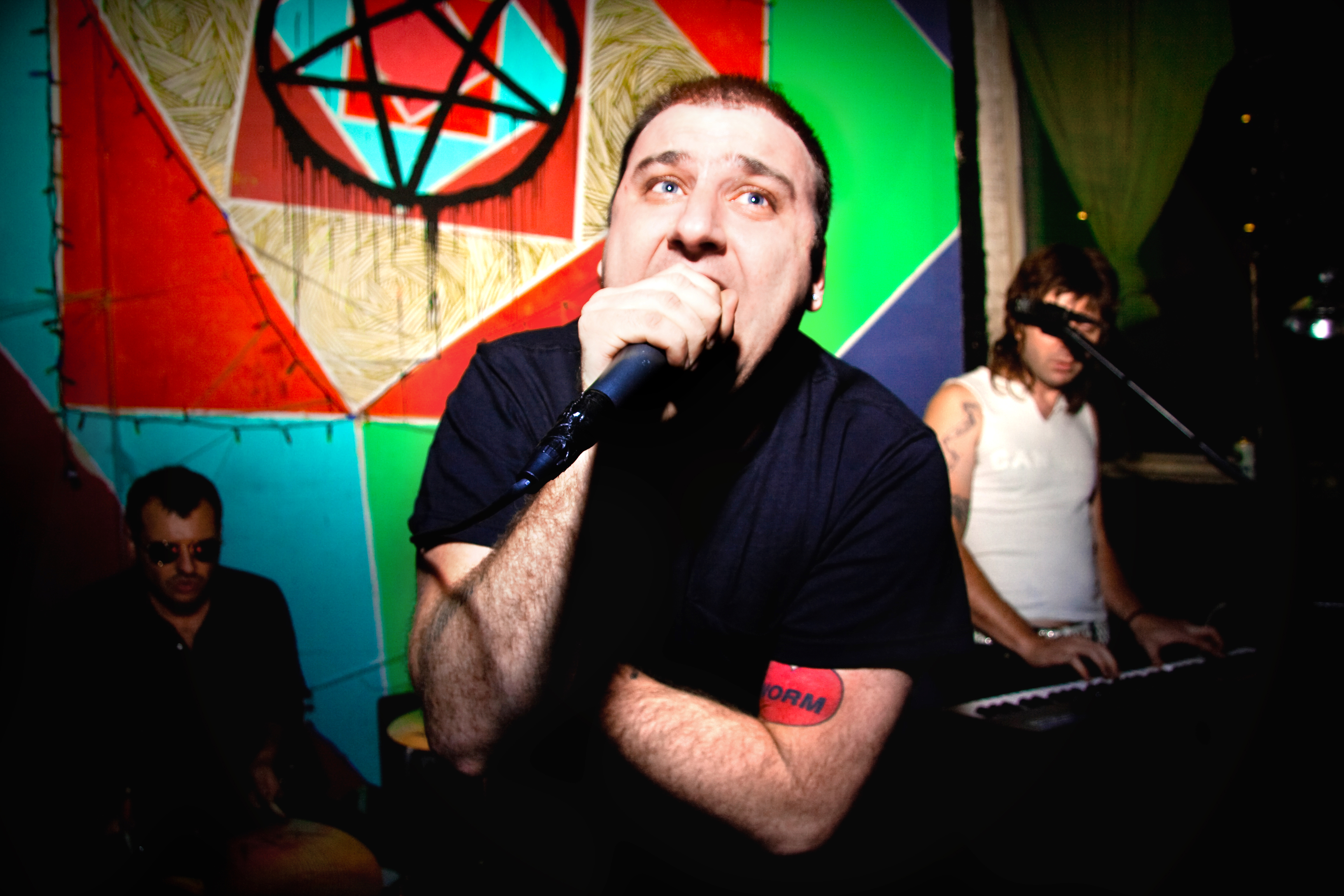
- Eric Paul with The Chinese Stars (2009)

Background information
- Born: Eric Paul; January 4, 1974 (age 52); Providence, Rhode Island, U.S.
- Genres: Noise rock
- Occupations: Singer-songwriter, musician, writer
- Instrument: Vocals
- Years active: 1997–present
- Labels: Skin Graft, Three One G, Anchor Brain, Deathbomb Arc
- Member of: Psychic Graveyard, The Chinese Stars
- Formerly of: Arab on Radar, Doomsday Student

Eric Paul (born January 4, 1974) is an American noise rock singer, writer, and poet, from Providence, Rhode Island.

== Biography ==
Eric Paul was born on January 4, 1974, in Providence, Rhode Island.

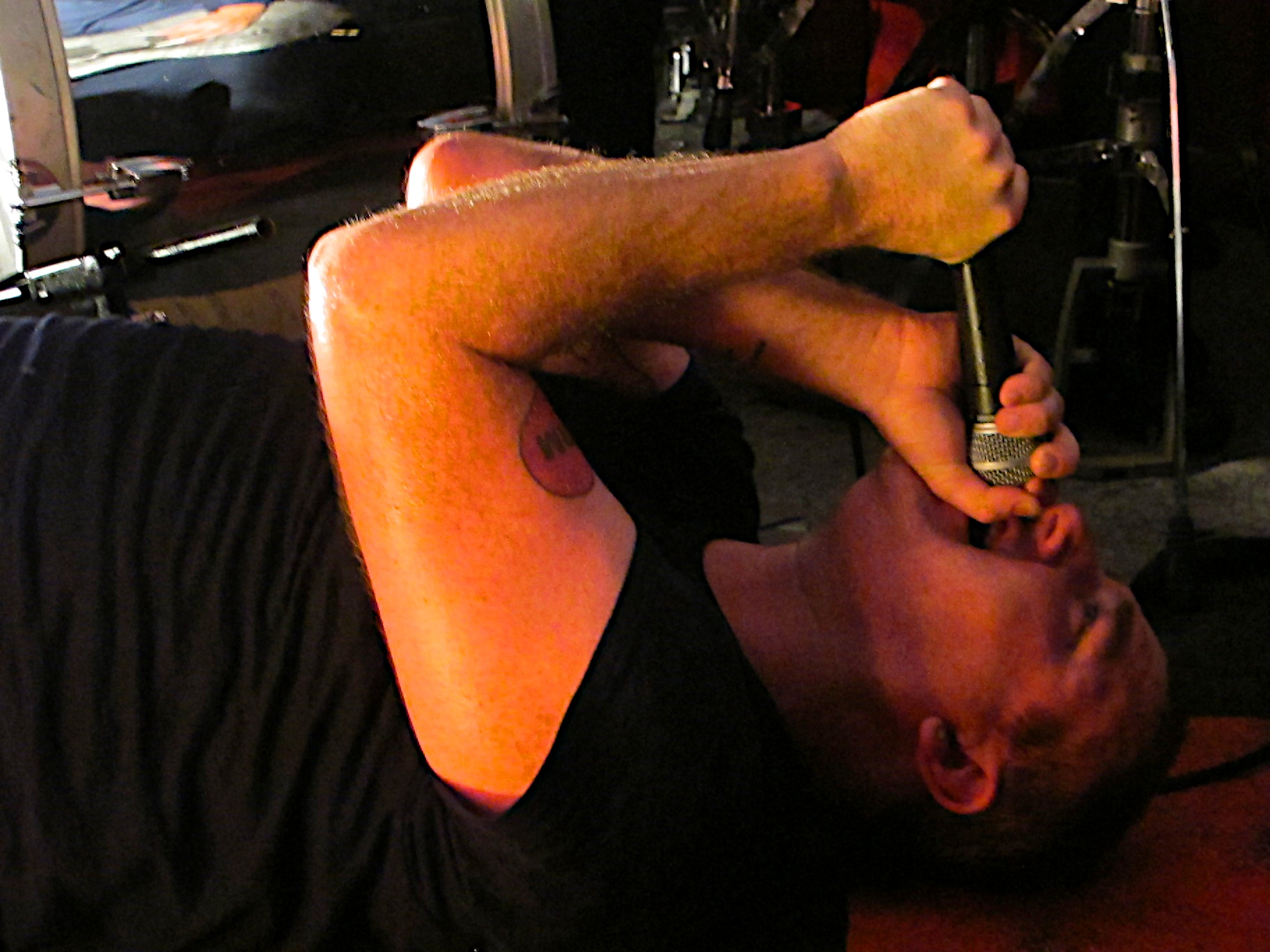
Paul with Arab on Radar in 2010 at AS220 in Providence, Rhode Island

He is known for his erratic vocals, surrealistic lyrics and energetic stage presence. Eric Paul has played in many popular noise bands, such as Arab on Radar, The Chinese Stars, Doomsday Student, and Psychic Graveyard. Paul's music has been released mostly by Three One G Records, SKiN Graft Records, and Deathbomb Arc.

Paul has published three full-length collections of poetry and released various spoken word releases. His work has also appeared in numerous literary journals and magazine including, New York Observer, Hypertext, Ninth Letter, The Volta, Word Riot, Lunch Ticket, Booth, The Literary Review and more. His first two poetry collections: I Offered Myself As The Sea and A Popular Place To Explode were published by Wesley Eisold's (Cold Cave, American Nightmare)independent publishing company, Heartworm Press. Paul's third collection, ‘’A Suitcase Full Of Dirt’’ was published by Tolsun Books, and independent press out of Flagstaff, Arizona.

== Discography ==
=== Arab on Radar ===
- (1997) Kangaroo b/w Pig Roast (Heparin Records)
- (1998) Queen Hygiene II (Heparin)
- (1999) Rough Day at the Orifice (Op Pop Pop)
- (1999) Samurai Fight Song b/w Swimming With A Hard-On (Load Records)
- (2000) Soak the Saddle (Skin Graft)
- (2001) 10 Meals Away from a Crack Whore b/w Piggin' in the Pumpkin Patch (GSL)
- (2001) Yahweh or the Highway (Skin Graft)
- (2002) Stolen Singles (Three One G)
- (2002) Running with Asthma (split with Kid Commando) (Ideal Recordings)

=== Doomsday Student ===
- (2011) A Jumper's Handbook (Anchor Brain)
- (2014) A Walk Through Hysteria Park (Three One G)
- (2016) A Self-Help Tragedy (Skin Graft)

=== The Chinese Stars ===
- (2003) Turbo Mattress (Skin Graft Records)
- (2004) Cheap City Halo b/w Girls of Las Vegas (Artrocker)
- (2004) A Rare Sensation (Three One G Records)
- (2005) TV Grows Arms b/w The Drowning (Kitty Play Records)
- (2007) Listen to Your Left Brain (Three One G, Skin Graft)
- (2009) Heaven on Speed Dial (Anchor Brain)

=== Psychic Graveyard ===
- (2019) Loud as Laughter (Skin Graft)
- (2019) The Next World EP (Skin Graft)
- (2020) Mouths EP (Deathbomb Arc)
- (2020) A Bluebird Vacation (Deathbomb Arc)
