= Cryptooology =

2004 studio album by Yowie

Studio album by Yowie
- Released: October 5, 2004
- Recorded: 2004
- Studio: Penny Studios, St. Louis, Missouri
- Genre: Math rock; experimental rock; instrumental rock
- Length: 29:58
- Label: Skin Graft

Yowie chronology
Cryptooology (2004)	Damning with Faint Praise (2012)

Cryptooology is the debut studio album by American experimental rock band Yowie, released by Skin Graft Records on October 5, 2004. A band of two guitarists and a drummer, Yowie recorded the album earlier that year at a studio in their hometown of St. Louis, Missouri. The trio wrote and refined the album's seven instrumental songs through four years of rehearsal, devoting close attention to every part of their music—even segments that were only a few seconds long. The resulting music represents an extreme, technically demanding vein of math rock that avoids conventions of songwriting like melody or repetition. Though the band's playing sounds chaotic or disorienting, it is not improvised.

Critics have variously compared the album's unusual sound to free jazz; to recordings by such experimental bands as Ruins, U.S. Maple, DNA, and Mars; and to the compositions of Carl W. Stalling, who wrote scores for Looney Tunes. Cryptooology has received praise for its musical complexity and stylistic radicalism, but even positive reviews typically caution that the album is liable to strike listeners as ugly or baffling. While the band regretted the record's lackluster audio quality, they continued to play rewritten versions of songs from the album at live shows.

== Recording and release ==
The band Yowie formed in St. Louis in 2000. The trio—drummer Shawn O'Connor and guitarists Jeremiah Wonsewitz and Jim Hagerty—spent the next four years composing and rehearsing their first batch of songs. During these early practice sessions, the band would devote a significant amount of attention even to minuscule segments lasting only a few seconds.

In 2004, Yowie recorded several tracks at Penny Studios in St. Louis. The band mastered and mixed the album themselves, as they were unable to afford any other option. The band members were ultimately unsatisfied with the lackluster audio quality of the studio recording. O'Connor said the album "sounded like it was recorded in a tin can by a simpleton, which it was basically"; in an interview conducted more than a decade after the album's release, he said, "I still have fantasies about beating our first engineer to death with hammer."

Yowie were offered a deal to release an album on Skin Graft Records, a label which had become closely associated with math rock in the 1990s. The label's owner, Mark Fischer, met Yowie when they opened for the band Cheer-Accident, who had already signed to Skin Graft. Cryptooology was released on CD on October 5, 2004. Yowie performed an album release concert on November 6. The album was not issued on vinyl, though Fischer expressed interest in the possibility in a 2013 interview.

== Composition ==
"Tara"
The first 30 seconds of "Tara" exemplify Yowie's frenetic, yet highly disciplined style of instrumental math rock used throughout Cryptooology.

Cryptooology runs just short of a half hour across seven instrumental tracks, each of which is titled after a feminine given name starting with the letter "T". Yowie's minimal lineup provides drums and two electric guitars, both using amplification sans effects, performing a highly technically demanding variant of math rock. Though apparently chaotic or improvised, the compositions are highly precise and controlled. Sounding somewhat like free jazz, the music lacks grooves, motifs, or most other musical elements of repetition. O'Connor characterized his band's sound on Cryptooology as "disjointed and random" with "very little repetition of any sort that was recognizable" In a 2013 group interview, the members of Yowie said:

Cryptooology was extreme, no doubt. We wanted it to be harsh, and we fully appreciated that this harshness was pushed to absurd levels, but it was meticulously harsh. We wanted the songs to be balls out, all the time, without concern for smoothing out edges, making things easier to consume—we wanted to let the parts exist and flow on their own terms and found strange ways to make them have to work with one another.

A critic at Punk Planet described the sound as "highly sophisticated noisecore that has no part repeating for more than one second, which means it takes a lot of work to write a five-minute song." Reviewers have noted the relentless approach can make it difficult for listeners to readily distinguish one track from another. However, the closing track, "Talisha", can be heard as relatively gentler than the preceding six songs.

One reviewer likened the music to free jazz and noted "[t]here are no grooves or motifs, let alone melodies, to anchor the music. That disorientation is just what Yowie intends, of course." The album's sound has been compared to experimental rock bands like Ruins and U.S. Maple, as well as bands from the "no wave" scene like DNA and Mars. According to Joseph Hess, writing for Riverfront Times, the songs possess "a certain air of comical whimsy" and the performances are "like two guitars given raspy, raunchy human voices, and their argument comes moderated by pointed percussion that's harsh but considerate." Andrew Clare at Plan B cited the music of composer Carl W. Stalling—who is best known for scoring cartoons like Looney Tunes and Merrie Melodies—and said Cryptooology "sounds like an explosion in a Slinky factory."

== Artwork ==
Rob Syers and Mark Fischer—the co-owners of Skin Graft Records—created the artwork used for the album packaging. The album cover is an illustration depicting two creatures pitched in battle. One of the creatures is humanoid or ape-like, evoking the band's name, as "yowie" refers to a creature from Australian folklore somewhat analogous to the North American Bigfoot. The other creature resembles a pterodactyl, though the members of Yowie have described it as a chupacabra.

== Reception ==
Professional ratings
Review scores
Source	Rating
AllMusic	3/5 stars
Tiny Mix Tapes	2/5 marks

Early reviews of the album were generally positive, albeit reserved, balancing praise for its innovation with significant qualifications related to its harshness and inaccessibility. John Goddard at Riverfront Times declared Yowie had "given birth to a new musical idiom" with what he described as an unlikely juxtaposition of jarring and catchy noises, though he cautioned that it "may be the ugliest, most grating music you've ever heard". AllMusic's Wade Kergan said it was "a pleasant debut that won't overstay its welcome," noting its relative lack of variety is offset by its brevity. The German zine Ox-Fanzine lauded the unique quality of its sound, which reviewer Frank Schöne characterized as a paradoxical blend of order and disorder. Mark Jenkins at The Washington Post called the album "vivid, if a bit exhausting."

Negative reviews acknowledged the band's impressive technical proficiency but nonetheless found Cryptooology to be tedious or grating. A reviewer at Tiny Mix Tapes called it "a decent record for what it is: a rambunctious half-hour of unmitigated battering", and ultimately found it to be disappointing from a technical perspective: "they have the proper tools to make interesting music ... [but] they either don't know what to do with the tools or simply aren't concerned with knowing." Liz Armstrong at Chicago Reader felt the album was filled with "carve-a-maze-in-your-brain no-wave compositions that get most of the guys in the crowd excitedly pulling their beards but bore most of the girls to pieces", and continued: "I won't deny Yowie's obvious technical talent, but their incessant noodling fucking gets on my nerves."

Retrospective appraisals have typically highlighted the album as a challenging but rewarding listen for math rock aficionados. Nine years after the album's release, Conor Fynes of Prog Sphere said that although Cryptooology cannot be lightly recommended to "the faint of heart or easily unimpressed", it possesses "a brilliance and calculation ... [with] method and meticulous thought behind [its] breakdown of rock tradition, and that alone should make it a worthy venture for the more adventurous listeners out there." In 2017, Leah B. Levinson at Tiny Mix Tapes recalled finding the album on YouTube and feeling baffled by it: "First my neurons must realign" wrote Levinson. With time however, she began to understand the record, and called it "both wild and refined. It delivered the primitive angular sketchbook violence that the Sasquatch brawl on its cover promised." In 2020, the math rock–themed publication Fecking Bahamas ranked Cryptooology the 32nd greatest album of the genre, with writer Nikk Hunter dubbing it the band's "magnum opus" and "[o]ne of the most, if not the most, technically insane albums on this list." As of 2012, Yowie continued to perform rewrites of songs from Cryptooology in their live shows.

== Track listing ==
All tracks are written by Yowie

No.	Title	Length
1.	"Trina"	2:43
2.	"Tamika"	2:38
3.	"Tara"	6:21
4.	"Tenesha"	3:25
5.	"Toni"	4:56
6.	"Towanda"	4:23
7.	"Talisha"	5:29
Total length:		29:58

== Personnel ==
Yowie

- Jeremiah Wonsewitz – guitar; mastering and mixing ("with the rest of Yowie")
- James Hagerty (credited as "Jimbo") – guitar
- Shawn O'Connor (credited as "Defenestrator") – drums

Album artwork

- Mark Fischer – coloring
- Rob Syers – drawing
