= Craw (band) =

American band

- Origin: Cleveland, Ohio, U.S.
- Genres: Noise rock, math rock, post-hardcore, alternative metal, sludge metal
- Years active: 1988–2002, 2016
- Labels: Hydra Head, Northern Spy Records
- Members: Rockie Brockway (guitar), Zak Dieringer (bass), Joe McTighe (voice), Will Scharf (drums)
- Past members: David McClelland (guitar), Neil Chastain (drums), Chris Apanius (bass), Lori Davis (drums)
- Website: crawband.com

Craw were an American independent band from Cleveland, Ohio. They belonged to the harder-edged branch of the math rock or post hardcore movement, in the same category as bands such as Colossamite, Keelhaul, Zeni Geva, Dazzling Killmen and Ruins.

== History ==
Craw were an underground band from Cleveland, Ohio, initially active from 1988 through 2002. From 1993 through 2002, Craw released four full-length albums.

Formed at Case Western Reserve University in Cleveland, the group originally consisted of David McClelland and Rockie Brockway on guitars, and Chris Apanius on bass. Vocalist Joe McTighe and drummer Lori Davis joined soon after, and in 1990, that lineup recorded a self-titled demo. In the fall of 1990, Lori Davis left the group and was replaced by Neil Chastain. The new lineup recorded a second demo, Celephais, as well as several singles and the band's first, self-titled album. Apanius and Chastain left the group in 1994 and 1995, respectively, and were replaced by Zak Dieringer and Will Scharf.

Craw amassed a local following in the early '90s, often performing at Cleveland's Euclid Tavern, and during the mid-to-late '90s, they toured North America frequently, sharing bills with bands such as The Jesus Lizard, Melvins, and Neurosis.

The group's first three full length recordings—1993's craw, 1994's Lost Nation Road and 1997's Map, Monitor, Surge—were recorded with the help of Steve Albini. The last release, entitled Bodies for Strontium 90, was engineered by Bill Korecky at Mars Studios, and is available on the indie label Hydra Head Records.

In late 2015, Northern Spy Records reissued craw's first three albums as a limited-edition vinyl box set. The band reunited for two concerts in March 2016. All seven members that appeared on craw's four studio albums performed at these shows.

== Musical style ==
Craw's music features tight, rhythmically complex riffs; vocals that range from a faint whine to an explosive shriek; a broad dynamic range; atmospheric guitar textures; epic song structures; and esoteric lyrical themes. The band incorporates elements of post-hardcore, metal, math rock, progressive rock and experimental improv that does not fit comfortably into any one genre.

== Comments from other musicians ==
Several artists have expressed their admiration for Craw, including Aaron Turner of Isis, Mike Hill of Tombs, Steve Albini, and Doug Moore of Pyrrhon. Commenting on their eclectic style, Albini said: "They never imitate. Other bands imitate them."

== Discography ==
=== Reissues ===
- 2015 – 1993–1997 6-LP box set – Northern Spy Records

=== Full-length releases ===
- 1994 – craw s/t CD/Cass – Choke, Inc.
- 1994 – Lost Nation Road CD/LP – Choke, Inc.
- 1997 – Map, Monitor, Surge CD – Cambodia Recordings
- 2002 – Bodies for Strontium 90 – Hydra Head Records (CD) / Radar Swarm Records (vinyl)

=== Demos ===
- 1990 – craw (self-titled, self-released demo 1)
- 1991 – Celephais
- 1992 – craw (self-titled, self-released demo 2)

=== Singles ===
- 1992 – Elliot b/w My Sister's Living Room 7-inch – Hit & Run Records
- 1993 – 405 b/w Stomp 7-inch – Choke, Inc.
- 1996 – Butterflies b/w $10000 Reward split 7-inch w/ Primitive – No Lie Records
- 1996 – Cancerman comic book 7-inch – Super Model Records
- 1998 – Space is the Place split 7-inch w/ Sicbay – Obtuse Mule Records

=== Compilations ===
- 1992 – Hotel Cleveland Vol. 3 – Scat Records
- 1994 – 3,128 Seconds Over Cleveland – WUJC/Scat Records
- 1996 – CLE Magazine comp. - CLE Magazine No. 4
- 1997 – CLE Magazine comp. - CLE Magazine No. 5
- 1998 – The Good, the Bad, and the Ugly triple 7-inch – Insolito
- 2000 – Decline of the Midwestern Civilization – Ant Records
- 2002 – Digging Out The Switch Again – A Tribute to the Dazzling Killmen (covering "My Lacerations") – The Subversive Workshop

== Personnel ==
=== Final lineup ===
- Rockie Brockway (guitar)
- Zak Dieringer (bass)
- Joe McTighe (voice)
- Will Scharf (drums)

=== Previous musicians ===
- David McClelland (guitar)
- Neil Chastain (drums)
- Chris Apanius (bass)
- Lori Davis (drums)
- Matt Dufresne (baritone saxophone, guest)
- Marcus DeGrazia (alto saxophone, guest)
