= Brise-Glace =

American rock band

- Origin: Chicago, Illinois, U.S.
- Genres: Post-rock
- Years active: 1993–1997
- Label: Skin Graft
- Past members: Jim O'Rourke; Darin Gray; Dylan Posa; Thymme Jones

Brise-Glace (French for "ice-breaker") was a 1990s instrumental avant-rock "supergroup" composed of Jim O'Rourke (guitar, organ, tape and "razor blade"), Darin Gray (bass guitar), Dylan Posa (guitar), and Thymme Jones (drums).

Formed in 1993, the mostly Chicago-based band had recorded and toured sporadically in various configurations until 1997. Brise-Glace used guitar improvisation, white noise, and found sounds to create a brooding and almost minimal, eerie musical sound.

== History ==
Brise-Glace formed shortly after O'Rourke and Gray met at a concert of Gray's group Dazzling Killmen. Posa (then of the Flying Luttenbachers) and Jones were drafted soon afterwards.

The group had recorded and released the five-song, 50-minute When in Vanitas... on Skin Graft Records in 1994. The recording was engineered by Steve Albini and has guest appearances by Henry Kaiser on guitar, Gene Coleman on bass clarinet, Christoph Heemann on tape and David Grubbs on organ. Brise-Glace's recording aesthetic was partly inspired by the German group Can. They would improvise live in the recording studio, then O'Rourke would extensively edit the recording tapes; thus his "razor blade" credit. Shortwave radio noise, field recordings and other tape effects were also integrated into the final mix. A brief portion of one of the album's tracks "Neither Yield Nor Reap" was used in a 2000 Saturday Night Live short about Neil Armstrong.

The band also recorded a 1994 7" titled In Sisters All and Felony/Angels on Installment Plan, and their cover of "Angus Dei Aus Licht" was released on Skin Graft's AC/DC tribute series Sides 1-4 in 1996. Their track "Likeness" appeared on 1997's Camp Skin Graft: Now Wave (!) Compilation.

== Related projects ==
Yona-Kit was active simultaneously and closely related, with Japanese guitarist KK Null replacing Posa and steering the group towards a more aggressive sound but still with an experimental edge.

Brise-Glace was among the many projects of which Jim O'Rourke had taken part of in the 1990s. Besides his work as a producer, solo artist and filmmaker, he had also played in The Bells, Gastr del Sol, Illusion of Safety, Yona-Kit, and Sonic Youth.

Bassist Darin Gray is a veteran of St. Louis band Dazzling Killmen, as well as You Fantastic!, and Yona-Kit. Guitarist Dylan Posa has played with The Flying Luttenbachers and Cheer-Accident. Drummer Thymme Jones has played with Cheer-Accident, You Fantastic!, and Yona-Kit.

== Discography ==
=== Albums ===
- When in Vanitas… (1994, Skin Graft)

=== Singles ===
- In Sisters All and Felony (7" 1994, Skin Graft)

=== Tracks on V/A compilations ===
- Sides 1-4 (1995, Skin Graft/Gasoline Boost)
- Likeness (Camp Skin Graft: Now Wave (!) Compilation, 1997)
