= Colby Starck =

American drummer

Colby Starck is a Chicago-based drummer who plays with Bobby Conn and Head of Femur. He began playing with Lincoln, Nebraska bands Roosevelt Franklin and Pablo's Triangle in the 1990s.

Colby Starck was also famously mistaken as the perpetrator of the Donnie Davies Internet hoax.
