= Face of Collapse =

1994 album by Dazzling Killmen

Studio album by Dazzling Killmen
- Released: March 14, 1994
- Recorded: September 1993
- Studios: Electrical Audio (Chicago, Illinois)
- Genres: Noise rock; post-hardcore; math rock; math metal; post-metal
- Length: 42:06
- Label: Skin Graft
- Producer: Steve Albini

Dazzling Killmen chronology
Dig Out the Switch (1992)	Face of Collapse (1994)	Recuerda (1996)

Professional ratings
Review scores
Source	Rating
Allmusic	4/5 stars
Ox-Fanzine	3.5/5 stars

Face of Collapse is the second and final studio album by Dazzling Killmen, released on March 14, 1994, through Skin Graft Records. Since its initial release, the album has been noted by reviewers to help influence the development of genres such as math rock, math metal, and post-metal with its use of song structures typically associated with jazz and progressive music.

To commemorate the 25th anniversary of Skin Graft Records, a deluxe remastered edition of the album was released on November 11, 2016, as a double LP set. This edition included a book detailing the band's history as well as remastered bonus tracks pulled from the "Medicine Me" 7-inch.

== Track listing ==
All tracks are written by Dazzling Killmen.

No.	Title	Length
1.	"Staring Contest"	3:18
2.	"Bone Fragments"	5:46
3.	"My Lacerations"	1:29
4.	"Blown (Face Down)"	5:52
5.	"Windshear"	2:08
6.	"Painless One"	4:44
7.	"In the Face of Collapse"	13:58
8.	"Agitator"	4:51

2016 Special Edition Bonus Tracks
No.	Title	Length
9.	"Medicine Me"	2:39
10.	"Poptones"	4:01
11.	"My Lacerations" (alternative mix)	1:25
Total length:		50:11

== Personnel ==
Dazzling Killmen

- Blake Fleming – drums, remastering
- Tim Garrigan – guitar
- Darin Gray – bass guitar
- Nick Sakes – guitar, vocals

Production and additional personnel

- Steve Albini – production
- Todd Harris – photography
- Paul Nitsche – art direction, design
- Mark Fisher – design
- Paul Nitsche – design
- Andres Balins – remastering
- Jason McEntire – remastering
