= The Lovvers LP =

Studio album by AIDS Wolf
- Released: 2006
- Genre: Noise rock
- Length: 25:02
- Label: Skin Graft, Lovepump United

The Lovvers LP is the debut studio album by Canadian noise rock band AIDS Wolf, released in 2006.

== Track listing ==
1. "Spit Tastes Like Metal" - 2:04
2. "Chinese Roulette" - 1:21
3. "We Multiply" - 1:49
4. "The Hat Collector" - 2:38
5. "Vampire King" - 1:52
6. "Panty Mind" - 2:05
7. "Opposing Walls" - 1:33
8. "Some Sexual Drawings" - 11:45
