= Llovessonngs =

EP by Bobby Conn
- Released: December 13, 1999
- Genre: Glam rock Pop rock Progressive rock
- Label: Thrill Jockey
- Producer: Bobby Conn

Bobby Conn chronology
Rise Up! (1998)	Llovessonngs (1998)	The Golden Age (2001)

Professional ratings
Review scores
Source	Rating
Pitchfork	(4.2/10)
Freq.org.uk	(not rated)

Llovessonngs is an EP released by Chicago-based musician Bobby Conn, which was released in 1999 on Thrill Jockey

== Track listing ==
All songs by Bobby Conn, except "Without You" by Pete Ham and Tom Evans, and "Maria B" by Caetano Veloso. All songs arranged by Bobby Conn and Julie Pomerleau

1. "Free Love" (4:35)
2. "Virginia" (6:16)
3. "Without You" (5:40)
4. "Maria B" (6:14)

== Personnel ==
- Bobby Conn - vocals, guitar
- Virginia Montgomery - vocals on "Virginia"
- Monica Bou Bou - organ, strings, moog
- Darin Gray - bass
- Sarah Allen - drums
- Ernst Long - trumpet
- Jeb Bishop - trombone
- Fred Lonberg-Holm - cello
- Michael Zerang - Bass Drum, Congas, Tambourine
