= Thymme Jones =

American drummer

Thymme (pronounced Tim) Jones (born 1962) is the drummer for the Chicago, Illinois-based band Cheer-Accident. Jones frequently appears on the local public-access television cable TV program Cool Clown Ground. He has appeared on a number of Bobby Conn albums, playing drums on Conn's biggest hit "Never Get Ahead", as well as trumpet, piano and moog synthesizer on Conn's later albums Rise Up! and The Golden Age. In addition to Cheer-Accident, Thymme played with the groups Brise-Glace and Dot Dot Dot, the latter of which also included Jef Bek, Chris Block and Ross Feller. He plays drums, piano and trumpet on Smog's 1997 record Red Apple Falls. He has also released several solo projects. In the 2000s, he collaborated with Panicsville.

== Discography ==
- While (1996)
- Career Move (1997)
- The Goal of Action Is Contemplation (2014)
- Never Again (With Feeling!) (2017)
