= The Golden Age (Bobby Conn album) =

Studio album by Bobby Conn
- Released: October 23rd, 2001
- Genre: Pop rock Progressive rock
- Label: Thrill Jockey
- Producer: Jim O'Rourke

Bobby Conn chronology
Llovessonngs (1999)	The Golden Age (2001)	The Homeland (2004)

The Golden Age is a 2001 album by Chicago-based rocker Bobby Conn, released by the Thrill Jockey label.

Conn said that the album "is really about this depressing realization that I managed to extend the teenage years into my mid-30s—that’s happened to a lot of people. American society is structured to deal with superficial identity questions to keep people from making trouble. If your main issue is how you dress and can you wear nose piercings to work, then you’re probably not going to protest war."

== Track listing ==
1. "A Taste of Luxury"
2. "Angels"
3. "You've Come a Long Way"
4. "The Best Years of Our Lives"
5. "Winners"
6. "The Golden Age"
7. "No Revolution"
8. "Pumper"
9. "Whores"

Bonus Tracks

1. "Seiko Shinai"
2. "The Whistler"

== Critical response ==
Professional ratings
Review scores
Source	Rating
NME	8/10 stars

The Golden Age has received the best all-round critical response of any of Bobby Conn's albums to date. Uncut magazine called it "almost magical", while Mojo admitted that "Self-consciously strange it may be, but [this album] proves Conn is much more than a novelty act." Q Magazine said that "the music is dazzling, daft and dark as the man himself", while Alternative Press suggested that "the genius of this record is its combination of theatricality and thrift. Conn easily finds art in what more self-consciously hip bands work hard to discard and denigrate". In Music We Trust praised Conn as "a talented songwriter able to craft, mold, and re-invent, Bobby Conn touches a style and turns it into gold."

== Personnel ==
- Bobby Conn – vocals, guitar
- Monica Bou Bou – violin, keyboards, vocals, recorder
- Glenn Kotche – drums on tracks 1, 4, 5 & 9
- Colby Stark – drums on tracks 2, 3 & 7
- Pat Samson – drums on track 8
- Josh Abrams – bass
- Jonathon Joe – bass, guitar
- Jeb Bishop – trombone
- Thymme Jones – trumpet
- Ernst Karel – trumpet
- Fred Lonberg-Holm – cello
- Nick Sula – piano
