= Dig Out the Switch =

Studio album by Dazzling Killmen
- Released: 1992
- Genre: Noise rock
- Length: 43:47
- Label: Intellectual Convulsion
- Producer: Jeff Tweedy

Dazzling Killmen chronology
Dig Out the Switch (1992)	Face of Collapse (1994)

Dig Out the Switch is the debut album of Dazzling Killmen, released in 1992 through Intellectual Convulsion.

== Track listing ==
All tracks are written by Dazzling Killmen.

No.	Title	Length
1.	"Serpentarium"	2:39
2.	"Dig the Hole"	2:10
3.	"Captain Is Dead"	2:25
4.	"Bottom Feeder"	2:14
5.	"Here Comes Mr. Big Face"	3:13
6.	"Spiral Mirror"	2:02
7.	"Reactor"	1:00
8.	"No"	2:00
9.	"Premonition"	2:24
10.	"Torture"	3:09
11.	"Ghost Limb"	4:26
12.	"Numb"	3:49
13.	"Code Blue"	12:20

== Personnel ==
Dazzling Killmen

- Blake Fleming – drums
- Darin Gray – bass guitar
- Nick Sakes – guitar, vocals

Production and additional personnel

- Steve Albini – recording
- Jeff Tweedy – production
- Miles Rutlin – painting
