= Yowie (band) =

American experimental rock band

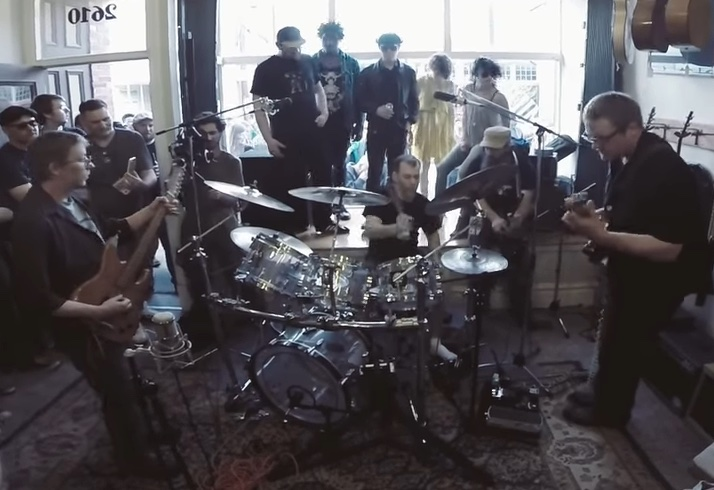
- Yowie in 2015

Background information
- Origin: St. Louis, Missouri, United States
- Genres: Math rock, noise rock, jazz rock
- Years active: 2001–present
- Label: Skin Graft
- Members: Shawn O'Connor Jack Tickner Daniel Ephraim Kennedy
- Past members: Lil' Pumpkin (~2000-2012); Jeremiah Wonsewitz (2000-2018); Chris Trull (2012-2018)
- Website: www.skingraftrecords.com/bandhtmlpages/yowie.html

Yowie is an experimental rock band from St. Louis, Missouri, founded in 2000. The original lineup consisted of Jeremiah Wonsewitz on electric guitar, Jimbo "Moppy" or "Lil' Pumpkin" on electric guitar and Shawn "The Defenestrator" O'Connor on drums.

Yowie plays a complex style of unprocessed instrumental math rock, composed of meticulously arranged pieces that rely on compositional techniques that are seldom heard in rock based music. It is high-velocity music of intense discipline, rigid structure and focused force. The music has been compared to math rock bands such as Hella, Tera Melos, Arab on Radar, Ahleuchatistas, Don Caballero and Zeuhl band Koenji Hyakkei.

Despite these attempts at reference points, the band's sound remains difficult to characterize. There have been many attempts at describing the uniqueness of Yowie's sound, such as by Diana Benanti of the Riverfront Times, saying that, "Music like this can't be made by mere people and yet, you couldn't write a computer program capable of producing this kind of brain damage. It's so grand in composition but honed and microperfected until words like 'tempo,' 'rhythm' and 'melody' become meaningless abstractions."

Yowie have been signed to Skin Graft Records since 2001, and spent three years writing and recording their debut album Cryptooology, released in 2004.

Yowie recorded a song for Sides 11-14 of the Skin Graft AC/DC series along with Colossamite, Pre, and Mule.

After many years of writing and some years of contention with one of the band members, they reformed and recorded their second album, Damning With Faint Praise at Key Club Studios in Michigan in July, 2011. Jimbo left the band upon completion of the recording, and was replaced by Christopher Trull (formerly of Grand Ulena). The group toured Europe extensively in 2012 to support Damning with Faint Praise.

Yowie recorded their third album, Synchromysticism, in August 2016. It was released in April 2017 on Skin Graft Records.

Yowie released their fourth album, Taking Umbrage, on October 3, 2025 on Skin Graft Records. Taking Umbrage is Yowie's first album to feature new guitarists Jack Tickner of Basil's Kite and Daniel Ephraim Kennedy of Cleric.

== Discography ==
- Cryptooology (Skin Graft Records, 2004)
- Damning with Faint Praise (Skin Graft Records, 2012)
- Synchromysticism (Skin Graft Records, 2017)
- Taking Umbrage (Skin Graft Records, 2025)
