= The Chinese Stars =

American noise rock band

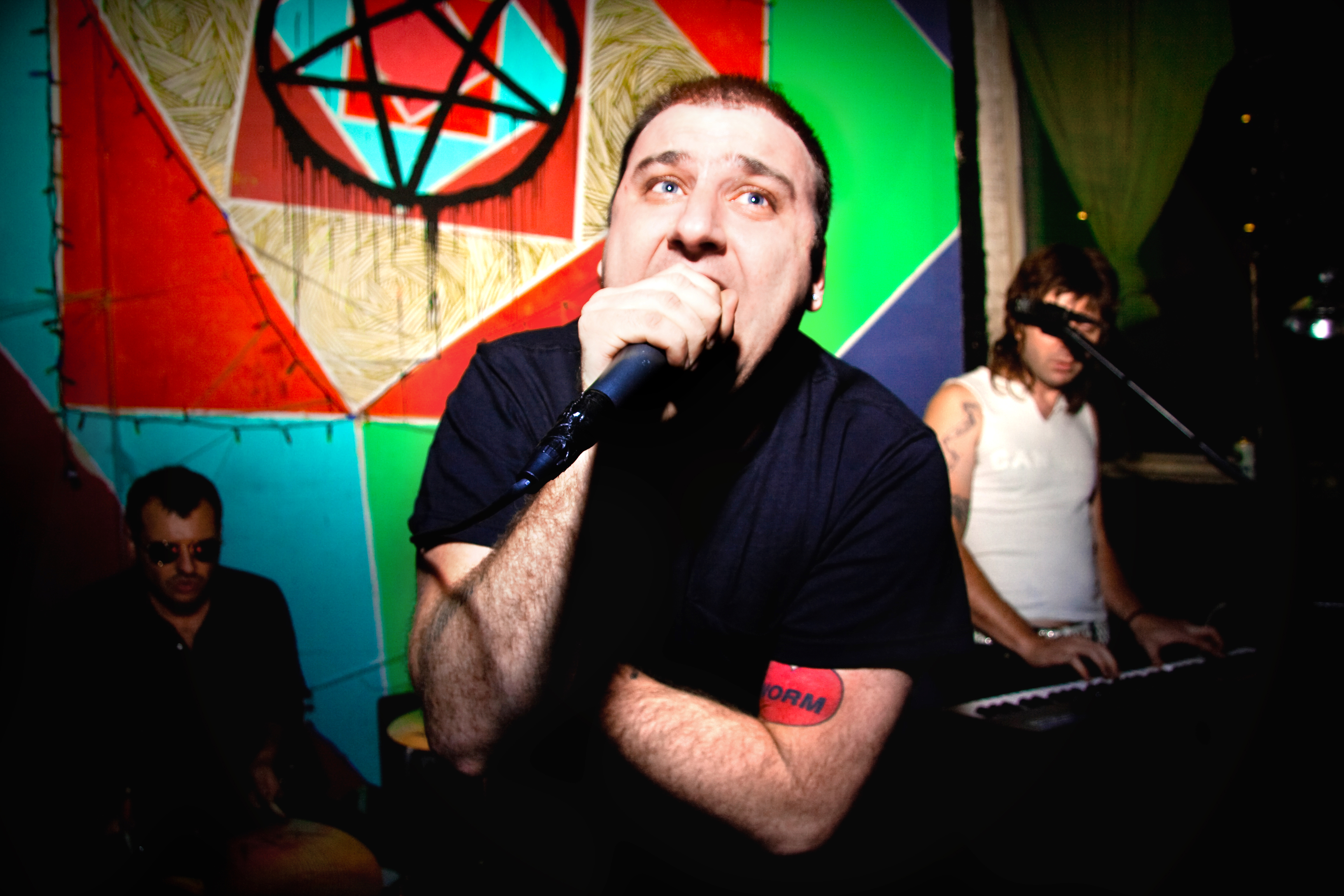
- The Chinese Stars (2009) at The Black Lodge, Seattle

Background information
- Origin: Providence, Rhode Island, U.S.
- Genres: Noise rock; electronic rock
- Years active: 2003–present
- Labels: Skin Graft; Artrocker; Three One G; Kitty Play; Anchor Brain
- Spinoff of: Arab on Radar
- Members: Eric Paul; Craig Kureck; Paul Vieira; V. Von Ricci
- Past members: Rick Pelletier

The Chinese Stars is an American noise rock band from Providence, Rhode Island, formed in 2003.

== History ==
The band The Chinese Stars was formed in 2003 with several of the members from Arab on Radar, which had disbanded in 2002. The founding members include Eric Paul, Craig Kureck, and Rick Ivan Pelletier.

The band released their first album, Turbo Mattress, in 2003 through Skin Graft Records.

== Members ==
=== Current members ===
- Eric Paul (vocals)
- Craig Kureck (drums)
- Paul Vieira (guitar)
- V. Von Ricci

=== Past members ===
- Rick Ivan Pelletier

== Discography ==
- Turbo Mattress (Skin Graft Records) – 2003
- Cheap City Halo/Girls of Las Vegas (Artrocker) – 2004
- A Rare Sensation (Three One G Records) – 2004
- TV Grows Arms/The Drowning (Kitty Play Records) – 2005
- Listen to Your Left Brain (Three One G, Skin Graft) – 2007
- Heaven on Speed Dial (Anchor Brain) - 2009
