= Yona-Kit =

American-Japanese math rock band

Yona-Kit was a band comprising Jim O'Rourke, Darin Gray, Thymme Jones, and Brise-Glace.

== Background ==
A U.S.-Japanese collaboration, the group consisted of KK Null (electric guitar and vocals), Jim O'Rourke (electric guitar), Darin Gray (electric bass guitar), and Thymme Jones (drum set). All but Null were contemporaneously members of the group Brise-Glace, which featured a similar sound to Yona-Kit but were somewhat less aggressive and more experimental.

Yona-Kit released one album, Yona-Kit (1994) on Skin Graft Records. The album was recorded by Steve Albini in Chicago in June 1994. The album's cover photography, featuring gigantic stuffed animals of various sorts, as well as bizarre lyrics (dealing with such subjects as dancing sumo wrestlers), lend a whimsical character to music that is often fairly brutal and complex. Yasuko Onuki, the singer for the Japanese band Melt-Banana, contributes vocals for one song on the album, "Franken-Bitch."
