= Pre (band) =

English rock band

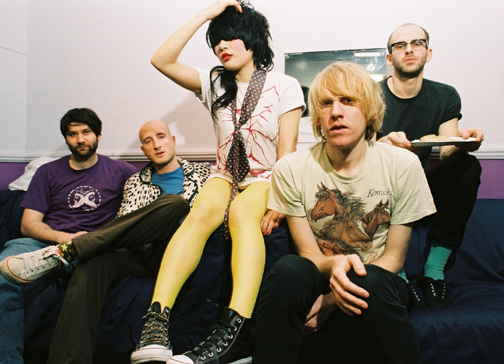
- PRE c. 2006

Background information
- Origin: London, England
- Genre: Noise rock
- Years active: 2005–2011
- Labels: Skin Graft Records, Lovepump United, Blood of the Drash, Merok
- Members: Akiko "Keex" Matsuura; Matt Warburton; Kevin Hendrix; John Webb; Richard 'Rodney' Bennett

Pre were an English band signed to Skin Graft Records. It is based in London and was formed around 2005. Pre included former members of Todd and Seafood. Guitar player John Webb is also a member of the noise rock band Male Bonding along with Kevin Hendrick.

== Discography ==
- Treasure Trails (EP and 7" on Blood of the Drash)
- Pre // demonstrations // AIDS Wolf // Crack und Ultra Eczema (2x7" gatefold 4-band split on Lovepump United)
- Their track "Dudefuk" appears on Rough Trade Shop's 2006 compilation CD of Counter Culture
- 10" Split with Bardo Pond on 'Keep Mother' Series
- Epic Fits CD on Skin Graft Records & LP on Lovepump United, 17 September 2007
- 7" Split with Comanechi on Merok Records
- 7" Split with Crystal Castles/Teenagers/Whisky vs Faith on Merok/Rough Trade
- 7" Split with AIDS Wolf on Skin Graft Records (2007)
- Third Album (2011)
