= Yip-Yip =

Electronic music duo

- Origin: Winter Park, Florida
- Genres: Experimental; Electronica; Ska; Jazz
- Years active: 2001–2012
- Labels: SAF Records; It Are Good Records; Glowmobile Records
- Spinoffs: Scud Nips
- Members: Jason Temple (Yip 1); Brian Esser (Yip 2)
- Website: yip-yip.bandcamp.com

Yip-Yip was an American experimental electronic duo from Winter Park, Florida, formed by Jason Temple and Brian Esser in March 2001. They are best known for combining aspects of electronica, ska, and jazz and for their eccentric costumes.

== Style ==
Their music is often cited as and includes elements of experimental, avant-garde, electro, casiocore, ska, jazz, and many more. In interviews when asked to classify the genre of their music Esser has said the influences for Yip-Yip's sound combine with their own unique style to create a different type of genre he can't even put a name to. "It is hard to pinpoint what our sound actually is. We say it's experimental or electronic, but we’re trying to think of a cooler name for it. Our music is something different, something interesting." terms such as "spazz-tronic", "electroniska", and "technuwave" have been created to better fit the band's sound.

== History ==
Jason Temple (Yip 1) and Brian Esser (Yip 2) met while in high school in Winter Park, Florida. The two would frequently meet in the cafeteria of the AdventHealth Orlando, and began writing music there. They wrote and recorded their first album in one month, and self-released it on CD-r. Their next two albums would also be released in a similar manner, and they would sneak some of them onto racks at local music stores.

After 2 years of creating music, Yip-Yip would play their first live show on January 20, 2003. The duo would wear welding masks coated with white fur to cover their faces in an attempt to get around stage fright both members experienced. During the show, they had a replica of one of the characters seen on the cover of their first album placed behind them, and would eventually rip the head of the replica off. The head contained VHS tape, and was thrown into the crowd. Their costumes would come to be one of the most notable parts of their performances, and typically featured black and white checkerboard designs.

Their first mini-tour would be in 2004 alongside An Albatross. They would also self-release their third album Pro-Twelve Thinker the same year. 2004 was also the first year they would be nominated as, and win the title of, Orlando Weekly's "Best Electronic Act". They would win the award every year afterward until their breakup. Pro-Twelve Thinker was pressed by S.A.F. Records as a CD and LP one year later in 2005. S.A.F. would also release Yip-Yip's next album, In The Reptile House, as a CD in 2006.

In 2007, Yip-Yip would tour with The Locust, and some of the shows on that tour would be with groups such as Melt-Banana and Upsilon Acrux. 2007 would also mark the release of Two Kings Of The Same Kingdom, initially pressed as an LP on the label It Are Good. In the following year, they would go on a mini-tour of Europe alongside An Albatross, and Two Kings Of The Same Kingdom would be re-released on CD, DVD, and VHS. Yip-Yip also released a side project under the name Scud Nips that year. It would be the band's last non-compilation release until their cover of "Been Caught Stealing" in 2011, and their last self-released album until Bone Up.

While on tour in 2010, Yip-Yip's costumes showed their faces for the first and only time. They would swap back to having their faces covered shortly after. Esser said regarding it, "Our welcome is easily worn out. That's why we're adding video to our performances now. I realize the problems with us as a live band; I know it's hard to make people enthusiastic about what we do. We're not that fun. We're not an all-night dance fest. We're playing synthesizers."

Yip-Yip would start to face problems in 2010 and 2011. After they finished recording Bone Up, they experienced difficulty getting it onto a label. Returning to their roots, they would self-release it on CD-r, as well as on cassette and as a digital download. However, the lack of interest from labels would be a major blow to Yip-Yip. "We sent it to a bunch of [labels] and nobody was interested," Esser said in 2011 for Orlando Weekly, "It was really depressing to send it to a bunch of friends and not hear anything back." It would eventually be pressed as an LP by Glowmobile Records in 2012. Bone Up, while not successful in terms of sales, marked a turning point in the band's sound, being the first album to include vocals—but it would be their final release.

At the end of April 2011, after living together in a space known as "The Reptile House" for six to seven years, Temple would move out to live with his girlfriend and to return to school. Temple did not see it as a massive shift, and suggested the two of them should start meeting in the cafeteria of the AdventHealth Orlando again. At the time, Esser noted that they kept having good ideas and pushing their own boundaries, and that they "hadn't missed their shot." However, after the conclusion of their final tour in 2012, Yip-Yip would break up.

== Equipment ==
Current set-up as listed according to the band's MySpace page: Korg MS-10, Micromoog, Realistic Concertmate MG-1, Ace Tone Top 5, Yamaha E♭ Alto Saxophone, Electro Harmonix POG, Moogerfooger Freqbox, Moogerfooger Ring Modulator, Ibanez AD-202, Synare PS-1, Synare Sensor, Simmons Multimallet, Korg Rhythm 55B, Casio CZ-101, ARP Omni II, Crumar T-1, Yamaha CP10, Boss Doctor Rhythm DR-110, Casio SK-1, Casio VL-1, Casio PT-20, Yamaha VSS-30, 5 Cymbals, and 1 Gong.

== Theatrics ==
Yip-Yip's live shows were accompanied by eccentric costumes and decorated synthesizers. The costumes were a sort of a way to make the transition from being a recording project to performing live and also as a way to cure the duo's stage fright. All the costumes were made out of their home in Winter Park.

== Influences ==
Yip-Yip's most notable influence is Devo. in an interview Esser said: "One of our biggest influences is Devo. We like their sound and their overall image. I also really like ska music from the ’80s and ’90s,"

== Discography ==
=== Studio albums ===
- 1 (2001)
- Skills (2002)
- Pro-Twelve Thinker (2004)
- In The Reptile House (2006)
- Two Kings Of The Same Kingdom (2007)
- Scud Nips I (2008)
- Bone Up (2011)

=== Extended Plays and Singles ===
- High Heel To Mammal EP (2003)
- Candy Dinner Single (2005)
- Munch Much Mush (Split 7-inch EP with 2Up) (2005)
- Club Mummy/Audacity Beach Single (2006)
- Been Caught Stealing (Jane's Addiction cover) (2011)

=== Appearances ===
- OK No Pants - Picnics For Music (2003)
- Munch Much Mush? - Funbalaya (2005)
- Untitled - Pests At Party Palace (2006)
- Club Mummy - Radioactive Decay - A Drop Dead Compilation Of Art Music (2007)
- Familyman Conundrum - S.A.F. Records - Sampler 2008 (2008)
- Genius Beast - Vice Saves Texas (2008)
- Gender Changers - Leak - Volume #4 (2009)
- Very Ape (Nirvana cover) - Nerdvana (2009)
- Double Dolphin - Total Bummer Comp (2010)
- Do I Look Divorced? - Yip Yip Remix (Remix of All Leather) - When I Get Older I Wanna Fuck Like A Remix (2010)
- Dead End - Quinceañera Volume 3 (2011)
- Apes Ahoy - Crypticomp Volume 2 (2011)
- Over It - Quinceañera Volume 4 (2012)
- Candy Dinner - Popmontreal (Release date unknown)

== Awards ==
Orlando Weekly's "Best Electronic Act" 9 years in a row: 2004, 2005, 2006, 2007, 2008, 2009 2010, 2011, & 2012.
