= Aran Tharp =

American film director

New York filmmaker Aran Tharp was born in 1977, and raised in Edwardsville, IL. He is best known as a "fourth member" of the avant-garde music group The Psychic Paramount. Tharp tours with the band, doing filming, photography, and lighting effects.

Tharp finished a short film for the band (Live in Rome) that was included on their 2005 album Gamelan Into the Mink Supernatural.

Another short film, As If By Remote, was produced for Laddio Bolocko and included in the double CD retrospective The Life and Times of Laddio Bolocko. As If By Remote was featured at 2002's Coney Island Short Film Festival, as well as the Rejections Film Festival in Bellingham, WA.

Most recently Tharp completed the film This Old Thing?, shot on location at a fashion photo shoot, with a score by Joe McCanta.

Tharp's film-making style is known for its quick edits, using very short (less than one second) clips, changed very quickly, and all shot on Super 8 film, in black and white.

In addition to filmmaking, Aran Tharp has appeared in a photograph taken by renowned fashion photographer David LaChapelle for an advertisement for Iceberg Clothing.

== Filmography ==
- As If By Remote (filmed in 1999, released in 2002 with Laddio Bolocko's The Life and Times of Laddio Bolocko)
- Live In Rome (filmed in 2002, released in 2005 with The Psychic Paramount's Gamelan Into The Mink Supernatural)
- This Old Thing? (2006)
