= Panicsville =

American noise music group

Panicsville is a Chicago noise music group founded in 1992 by Andy Ortmann (founder of Nihilist Records) with David Forquer and Ryan Kohler. It has become an ongoing project for Ortmann to work with other musicians. Early shows consisted of pelting the audience with items like dry ice, meat, blood and insects. Now the group generally plays shrieking, high-pitched noises dressed in strange black latex outfits, and physically attack their audience in a violent but playful fashion. At one time, the group consisted of 15 members -- Ben Armstrong and Drew St. Ivany from Laddio Bolocko and The Psychic Paramount among them; however, Jeremy Fisher and Andy Ortmann are the only two permanent members of the group. Recent collaborators include filmmaker Usama Alshaibi, Cock E.S.P., M.V. Carbon from Metalux and Thymme Jones from Cheer Accident.
