= Laddio Bolocko =

Noise rock band from New York City

- Origin: New York, NY, United States
- Genres: Math rock Noise rock Experimental rock Post-Rock
- Years active: 1996–2001
- Labels: Hungarian Records, No Quarter Records
- Past members: Ben Armstrong; Drew St. Ivany; Blake Fleming; Marcus DeGrazia

Laddio Bolocko was a noise rock band from New York City, formed in 1996 by members of Panicsville and the Dazzling Killmen. Their sound has drawn comparisons to experimental rock groups such as This Heat and Can and free jazz musicians like Albert Ayler. The band favored limited releases, offering only small pressings of their original albums. They toured internationally, recording and releasing the EP "As if by Remote" in Europe only.

After disbanding in 2000, Armstrong and St. Ivany formed a new noise rock band, The Psychic Paramount, while Fleming and DeGrazia formed Electric Turn to Me. No Quarter Records released the anthology of Laddio Bolocko in 2003, compiling all three original releases for the first time widely available to the listening public. They were featured in a David Cross DVD entitled "Let America Laugh."

== Members ==
- Drew St. Ivany – guitar
- Ben Armstrong – bass
- Blake Fleming – drums
- Marcus DeGrazia – horns

== Discography ==
- Strange Warmings of Laddio Bolocko (1997, Hungarian Records)
- In Real Time (1998, Hungarian Records)
- As if by Remote (1999, Hungarian Records)
- The Life & Times of Laddio Bolocko (2003, No Quarter Records) (featuring the Super 8 film "As if by Remote" by Aran Tharp)
