= Gorge Trio =

American experimental rock band

Gorge Trio is an American experimental rock band based in Oakland, California. It is composed of three-fourths of the critically acclaimed math rock band Colossamite, which disbanded in 1998, and is survived by three releases on Skin Graft Records.

Gorge Trio includes current members of Deerhoof, The Flying Luttenbachers, Natural Dreamers, and former members of underground pioneers Iceburn and Sicbay.

== Band members ==
- John Dieterich
- Chad Popple
- Ed Rodriguez

== Discography ==
=== Albums ===
- Dead Chicken Fear No Knife (Freeland Records - Italy, 1998)
- For Loss Of - w/ Milo Fine (Freeland Records - Italy, 1999)
- The Made Ups (Self Released, 2002)
- Open Mouth, o' Wisp (Skin Graft Records, 2004)
