= Kitty Play Records =

Kitty Play is a New Jersey–based record label formed in late 2003. The label's acts covers a wide variety of genres from straightforward rock music to abrasive noise. The label returned from hiatus in the spring of 2010 with a new full-length LP by San Diego underground band Kill Me Tomorrow.

== Bands ==
- 2673
- AIDS Wolf
- An Albatross
- Antennacle
- Athletic Automaton
- Bastard Noise
- Burden Brothers
- The Cherry Point
- The Chinese Stars
- Current Amnesia
- Dead Machines
- Aaron Dilloway
- Door
- Kevin Drumm
- King Darves
- Fossils
- Joshua David Hydeman
- Kill Me Tomorrow
- Ladderwoe
- Mr. California
- Newton
- Panicsville
- Pictureplane
- Duane Pitre / Pilotram
- Jessica Rylan
- Scientific Explanation of Despair
- The Supersuckers
- Talibam
- Twodeadsluts Onegoodfuck
- Unicorn
- John Wiese

== See also ==
- List of record labels
