= Recovery (Bobby Conn album) =

Studio album by Bobby Conn
- Released: March 20, 2020
- Length: 46:51
- Label: Tapete

Bobby Conn chronology
Macaroni (2012)	Recovery (2020)

Professional ratings
Aggregate scores
Source	Rating
Metacritic	68/100
Review scores
Source	Rating
PopMatters	7/10

Recovery is a studio album by American musician Bobby Conn. It was released on March 20, 2020 under Tapete Records.

== Critical reception ==
Recovery was met with generally favorable reviews from critics. At Metacritic, which assigns a weighted average rating out of 100 to reviews from mainstream publications, this release received an average score of 68, based on 5 reviews.

== Track listing ==
Recovery track listing
No.	Title	Length
1.	"Recovery"	4:15
2.	"Disposable Future"	5:37
3.	"Good Old Days"	5:23
4.	"No Grownups"	3:15
5.	"Brother"	4:59
6.	"On the Nose"	4:51
7.	"Bijou"	3:45
8.	"Disaster"	3:47
9.	"It's a Young Man's Game"	4:44
10.	"Always Already"	6:15
