= An Albatross =

American noise rock band

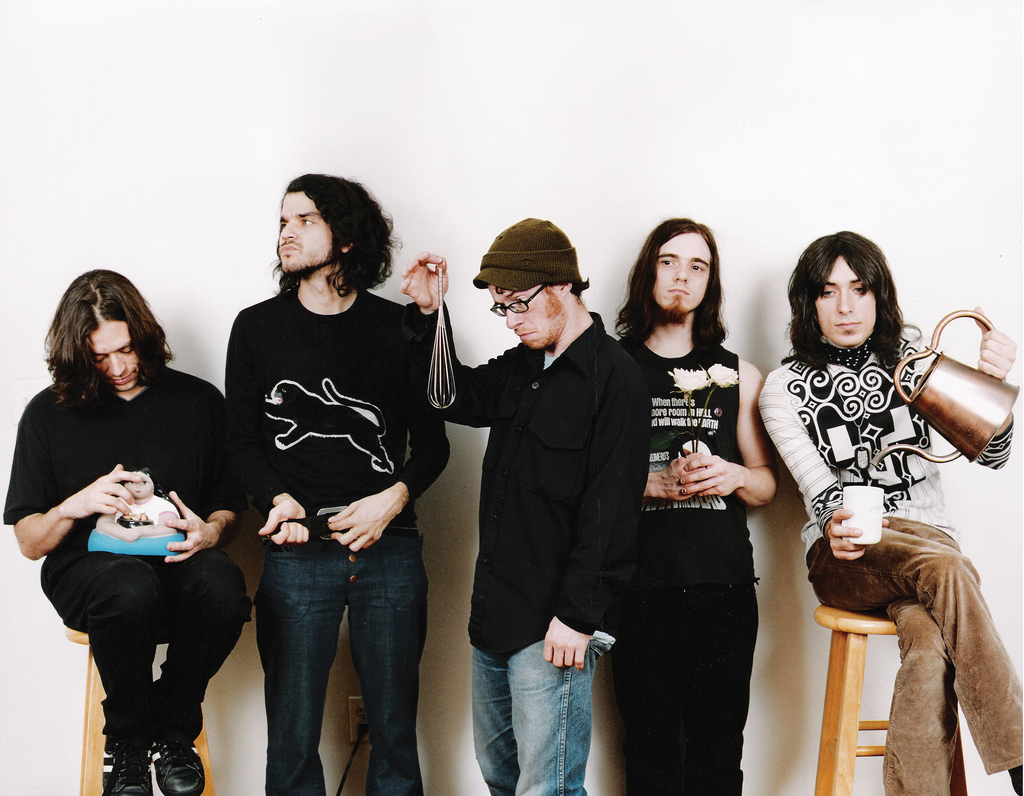

Background information
- Origin: Wilkes-Barre, Pennsylvania, U.S.
- Genres: Noise rock; Nintendocore; grindcore; sass
- Years active: 1999–present
- Labels: Ace Fu Records, GSL, Bloodlink Records, Kitty Play Records, Eyeball Records
- Members: Edward B. Gieda III; Daniel Kishbaugh; Jay Hudak; Kat Paffett; Steven Vaiani; Harry Lannon
- Past members: Phillip Reynolds Price; Jake Lisowski; Daniel Schlett; Kyle Fisher; Ed Klinger; Jeremy Gewertz; Robert Stitzer; Christopher Abbott; Carl Golembeski; Jeff Gregorio; Jonathan Novakovich

An Albatross is a noise rock band based in Philadelphia, Pennsylvania.

== History ==
Formed in the fall of 1999 by guitarist Jake Lisowski, vocalist Edward B. Gieda III, drummer Chris Abbott, bassist Jason Hudak, and organist Phillip Reynolds Price, the band quickly amassed material and recorded their cassette demo "1.) Sex 2.) Bird 3.) Cake." The following summer marked the first of many expansive tours that An Albatross has become renowned for.

In 2001, Philadelphian upstart label When Humans Attack! Records produced and released the Eat Lightning, Shit Thunder! 12" EP. Following the release of the 12", the CD version was pressed with permission by Bloodlink Records. The record was completed in two sessions during the winter months of 2000–2001 at Dungeon Studios in Upper Darby, PA. Despite the record only consisting of 11 minutes of music, nearly 20 hours were spent recording and mixing the record. Creatively Eat Lightning, Shit Thunder! was a departure from the grindcore-based, deep/growled-vocal laiden 1999 demo and resembled a hybrid of early 1990s grindcore, speed metal, and hints of progressive rock. The 12" EP debut spawned an exhaustive tour that bled into the writing and recording process of their second album, We Are The Lazer Viking CD-EP.

During the writing process of We Are The Lazer Viking, percussionist Jeremy Gewertz replaced Christopher Abbott, and synth player, Kat Paffett was added. The six person line-up heightened the creative potential of the group and eventually culminated in the Ace Fu Records 2003 release, We Are The Lazer Viking. The eleven-song/eight-minute "fetid noise rock blither" was recorded at the defunct Fun City Studio in Manhattan and produced by Wharton Tiers, who had previously worked with Sonic Youth, Dinosaur Jr. and Helmet. The composition and recording of We Are The Lazer Viking is markedly more complex and progressive, making heavy usage of synthesizers and erratic time signatures.

The EP fueled nearly three years of extensive national touring (which landed the group a spot at France's 2004 Eurockéennes festival) and created a hugely devoted cult-like following throughout North America and Europe. The buzz also caught ear of English DJ/journalist John Peel, which precipitated into an invite to record a session for BBC Radio 1, which the band recorded in March 2005.

Prior to the band's second trip to Europe, Jeremy Gewertz was replaced by drummer Ed Klinger. An Albatross toured nearly 130-odd dates with Klinger throughout the US and Europe (including the BBC session). In the summer of 2005, the group labored in Park Slope, Brooklyn, composing the impossible Blessphemy...of the Peace Beast Feastgiver and the Bear Warp Kumite, which would be recorded months later at the unlikely Don One Studios in Brooklyn by Carl Golembeski and Mike Peccio.

Drummer Steven Vaiani took the percussion reigns for the subsequent Blessphemy tours (2006–08), which have amounted in more than 200 shows since January 2006 in supporting the likes of Blue Cheer, Melt Banana, DMBQ, and Lightning Bolt throughout the U.S., Canada, and Europe.

In October 2007, former leader of New Jersey's The Post Office Gals, Daniel Schlett, joined on guitars and the group quickly amassed material for a future album. In a quick succession of events, the band announced a spring 2008/SXSW tour sans guitarist Lisowski, a signing with New Jersey's Eyeball Records in April 2008, and a rigorous 40-day studio schedule that would culminate in the October 21, 2008 release of the group's third full-length album "The An Albatross Family Album".

"The An Albatross The Family Album" tours extended from 2008 to 2010 with a grueling itinerary. The 120+ date tour spanned 13 countries, featured support dates with Enter Shikari, Don Caballero, ...And You Will Know Us by the Trail of Dead, co-headlining tours with White Mice, DMBQ, AIDS Wolf, Yip-Yip, Dark Meat, and high-profile appearances at the 2009 Dour Festival, Czech Fluff Festival and Fun Fun Fun Festival. Though the tour was a resounding success, the band experienced personnel turbulence – notably the departure of Schlett and Price in 2009 and 2010.

In 2016, with the encouragement of longtime friends, Daughters, An Albatross were billed in Philadelphia, alongside the Providence group for the first time in five years. This show subsequently spawned a string of regional & East Coast dates including an appearance at the 2017 Pop Montreal festival. Presently the band is working in the studio with plans to return to Europe for a summer 2018 tour.

In July 2020, they released their EP Return of the Lazer Viking.

== Members ==
Current

- Edward B. Gieda III – vocals (1999–present)
- Jason Hudak – bass (1999–present)
- Daniel Kishbaugh – guitar (2017–present)
- Steven Vaiani – drums (2006–present)
- Kat Paffett – synth (2002–08, 2016–present)
- Bubba Ayoub – synth & projections (2017–present)

Former & Revolving

- Phillip Reynolds Price – organ, synth (1999-2010)
- Christopher Abbott – drums (1999-2002)
- Jake Lisowski – guitar (1999-2008)
- Jeremy Gewertz – drums (2002-2005)
- Kyle Fisher – organ, synth
- Ed Klinger – drums (2005-2006)
- Daniel Schlett – guitar (2007-2009)
- Jeff Gregorio – Saxophone
- Jonathan Novakovich
- Robert Stitzer
- Carl Golembeski

== Discography ==
=== Studio albums ===
Title	Album details
Eat Lightning, Shit Thunder!	Released: 2001; Label: When Humans Attack! Records and Bloodlink Records
We Are the Lazer Viking	Released: 2003; Label: Ace Fu Records
Blessphemy...of the Peace Beast Feastgiver and the Bear Warp Kumite	Released: June 27, 2006; Label: Ace Fu Records
The An Albatross Family Album	Released: October 21, 2008; Label: Eyeball Records

=== Live albums ===
Title	Album details
Freedom Summer Live	Released: 2005; Label: Kitty Play Records
London:Live	Released: 2009; Label: Kitty Play Records

=== EPs / Splits ===
Title	Album details
An Albatross / XBXRX split 7-inch	Released: 2004; Label: GSL Records
Return of the Lazer Viking	Released: July 15, 2020; Label: Electric Suits 23

=== Demos ===
- 1.)Sex 2.)Bird 3.)Cake (Cassette tape – 1999)
- An Albatross & Carl G. (3" CD's – tour only 2000)

=== Other appearances ===
- Hoags 2xCD – "Channel 96.2" (2003)

== Videography ==
- Godass Soundtrack (2000) Directed by Esther Bell
- Presto Majesto (2003) – Included as part of the bonus material on the We Are the Lazer Viking CD, along with several videos of live performances.
- Lab Results Volume One (2006) – A collection of videos and live performances from Gold Standard Labs Records artists.
- Kevin Dougherty Presents (2006) – A collection of animations & edited/raw live footage from local shows & rehearsals. Available on tour-only.
- Viva La Bam (2006) Episode 204: Mardi Gras Part 1
