= The Homeland =

Studio album by Bobby Conn
- Released: January 20, 2004
- Recorded: 2003
- Studio: Soma Studios (Chicago, Illinois)
- Genre: Pop rock; progressive rock
- Label: Thrill Jockey
- Producer: John McEntire

Bobby Conn chronology
The Golden Age (2001)	The Homeland (2004)	King For a Day (2007)

Professional ratings
Review scores
Source	Rating
Uncut	link
Playlouder	link
PopMatters	(not rated) link

The Homeland is an album by Chicago-based rocker Bobby Conn and his backing band, the Glass Gypsies released on January 20, 2004, on Thrill Jockey records. It is noteworthy for taking a more openly political approach than any of Conn's previous albums, being particularly critical of George W. Bush and the Iraq War. Musically the album focuses mostly on a number of 70s styles, from early-decade prog pseudo-symphonies to late decade disco-rock fusion and funk. The album was recorded at Soma Studios, Chicago, Illinois, in 2003.

== Reception ==
The Homeland was met with mostly positive reviews. The Columbus Free Press gave it a glowing review, writing "It is rare when an album sets out to achieve such lofty goals as The Homeland. It's even more rare when the artist actually hits the mark on all levels." Uncut magazine gave the album 4/5 stars, calling Conn "witty and sharp", and stating that he can "tell a tale with aplomb". Mojo also awarded the album 4/5 stars, and Q Magazine awarded the album 3/5 stars, saying "[I]t's reassuring to run into the real McCoy. Chicago's Bobby Conn is just that."

On the negative side, Dave Queen of Stylus Magazine, stated that the album "fails" in comparison to its predecessor, criticizing John McEntire's production and Conn's subject matter, stating "I [...] miss the dysfunctional coke-sex ballads [i.e. of "The Golden Age"]". Playlouder gave the album 2.5/5 stars, mostly criticizing the album's political lyrical content, and asserting that "the results are anticlimactic"- however reviewer Jeremy Allen does admit that Conn "is clearly talented". PopMatters criticized the political lyrics as "crude and oversimplified" but admitted that "there are still plenty of killer hooks, and John McEntire's expert recording job makes the most of them, giving the mix a crisp clarity that assures that these intricate arrangements never sound decadently bloated."

== Track listing ==
1. "We Come in Peace"
2. "Homeland"
3. "Laugh Track (instrumental)
4. "We're Taking Over the World"
5. "Shopping" (instrumental)
6. "Relax"
7. "Home Sweet Home"
8. "Style I Need"
9. "Cashing Objections"
10. "Doctor & Nurse" (instrumental)
11. "Bus No. 243"
12. "Independence
13. "My Special Friend"
14. "Ordinary Violence"

The Japanese import contains one bonus track, entitled "Got to Get It."

== Personnel ==
- Bobby Conn - vocals, guitar
- Sledd - guitar
- Monica BouBou - organ
- Pearly Sweets - keyboards
- Nick Macri - bass
- the fudge - drums
