= The Rollo Treadway =

- Origin: Brooklyn, New York, United States
- Genres: Rock and Roll, Psychedelic pop, Baroque pop
- Years active: 2007 – present
- Members: David Sandholm; Tyler Wenzel; Grant Zubritsky; Jörg Krückel; Blake Fleming
- Website: www.therollotreadway.com

The Rollo Treadway is a Brooklyn-based psychedelic pop group formed in 2006. Their name is taken from a character in the 1924 Buster Keaton film, The Navigator. The group's music is distinguished by its intricate arrangements, lush vocal harmonies and cynical, idiosyncratic lyrics. It has been described by David Sandholm, the songwriter and lead singer, as "a dark, East Coast version of the 'California Sound,'" referring to the style of music made popular by The Beach Boys in the 1960s. Also in the group is Tyler Wenzel on guitar, Grant Zubritsky on bass guitar, Jörg Krückel on electric piano and organ and Blake Fleming (formerly of The Mars Volta) on drums.

The Rollo Treadway's self-titled debut CD, which was produced by Michael Deming, was released Dec. 16, 2008.

== Discography ==
=== Albums ===
- The Rollo Treadway (self-titled) (2007)
