= Rise Up! (Bobby Conn album) =

Studio album by Bobby Conn
- Released: November 3, 1998
- Genre: Glam rock; pop rock; progressive rock; experimental rock
- Length: 43:59
- Label: Truckstop; Atavistic
- Producer: Jim O'Rourke

Bobby Conn chronology
Bobby Conn (1997)	Rise Up! (1998)	Llovessonngs (1999)

Professional ratings
Review scores
Source	Rating
NME	link
The Village Voice	link
Weekly Wire	link

Rise Up! is the second studio album by American musician Bobby Conn, released by Truckstop Records. It is a concept album.

== Track listing ==
1. "Twilight of the Empire" – 1:41
2. "Rise Up!" – 4:36
3. "Axis '67 (part 2)" – 6:14
4. "United Nations" – 2:47
5. "California" – 3:30
6. "Passover" – 6:24
7. "A Conversation" – 1:22
8. "Baby Man" – 3:56
9. "Baby Man (Refrain)" – 3:04
10. "White Bread" – 4:49
11. "Lullaby" – 3:56
12. "Ominous Drone" – 1:34
13. "Rise Up, Now!" – 3:47

== Personnel ==
- Bobby Conn – vocals, guitar
- Jim O'Rourke – bass synthesizer, guitar, piano
- Monica Bou Bou – piano, violin, vocals, melodica, strings
- Thymme Jones – trumpet
- Dylan Posa – bass on tracks 2,3,4,5,6,10,13
- Sarah Allen – drums on tracks 2,3,5,6,11,13; djembe
- Paul Mertens – flute, clarinet, tenor saxophone, piccolo flute, alto flute
