= Colossamite =

American math rock band

- Origin: Minneapolis, Minnesota, U.S.
- Genres: Math rock, noise rock Nu-math
- Years active: 1996–1998
- Labels: Skin Graft Records, Freeland Records
- Spinoffs: Gorge Trio
- Past members: Nick Sakes; Ed Rodrigues; John Dieterich; Chad Popple

Colossamite was an American math rock band based in Minneapolis, Minnesota. They were one of the most prominent exponents of the genre.

Colossamite's members included Nick Sakes (vocals, electric guitar), Ed Rodriguez (electric guitar), John Dieterich (electric guitar), and Chad Popple (drum set); the group had no bass player. All except Sakes were transplanted Wisconsinites.

Like similar groups such as Zeni Geva, Craw, U.S. Maple, or Dazzling Killmen (this last group for which Sakes sang before relocating to Minnesota) Colossamite's music was almost hyperbolically brutal, chaotic, and rhythmically and formally complex. Rather than relying, as most heavy metal bands, on guitar distortion to produce an intense sound, Colossamite instead often relied on very loud "clean" (undistorted) guitars, played dissonantly, in conjunction with vocals that were screamed rather than sung. Songs featured jarring shifts in tempo and mood, with the overall sound being extremely raw, heavy and often slow.

Colossamite released three recordings on the Chicago-based Skin Graft Records and one split CD on Italy's Freeland Records. The group, however, did not last long, perhaps because the extreme and uncompromising nature of its music (as with much contemporary classical music, which incidentally Colossamite's music resembles) was appreciated mainly by a niche audience, thus proving fairly uncommercial.

The group disbanded in 1998. Dieterich, Rodriguez, and Popple subsequently formed the experimental rock band Gorge Trio. Dieterich and Rodriguez also both went on to join Deerhoof, in 1999 and 2008 respectively.

== Discography ==
- 1997 - All Lingo's Clamor EP (Skin Graft)
- 1998 - Gust's of Lead split 7-inch with White Tornado (Skin Graft)
- 1998 - Economy of Motion (Skin Graft)
- 1998 - Frisbee EP - came with a Colossamite frisbee (aka Camera Within EP, Skin Graft)
