= Donnie Davies =

Fictional character

Donnie Davies is a fictional character who is featured in a number of websites. Davies describes himself as an Anabaptist youth pastor, "reformed homosexual", and lead singer for the band Evening Service. Davies and the band were unknown until the release of the music video for the anti-homosexuality song "The Bible Says" on the Internet in January 2007. Davies claims affiliation with the organization Love God's Way Ministries, which launched a website around the same time as the release of the video. He is also the founder and spokesman for the C.H.O.P.S. program. The acronym stands for "Changing Homosexuals into Ordinary People Sexually". C.H.O.P.S. is promoted through Love God's Way's website.

His video was removed from YouTube.com without comment from the company and has been removed by Google. It has since been put back up on YouTube.

== Controversy ==
Much of the initial controversy revolved around whether or not Davies is genuinely promoting an anti-gay agenda, or if this is a viral marketing campaign. Some gay rights advocates acknowledge that as a spoof it is humorous, but claim the message behind it is still as malicious as someone who seriously possessed the opinion. Debate has quickly risen regarding the authenticity of Davies' youth ministry activities, the band Evening Service, and the organization Love God's Way ranging from entertainment publications such as Spin to thousands of personal blogs. Some in the blogosphere maintained that Davies was truly seeking to "convert" other homosexuals to heterosexuality. Others considered Davies ministry and the video part of a carefully designed hoax mocking the Christian Conservative community. Other controversies involve the claims on Donnie's website of what music "will make you gay." This included some of his own music.

Gay rights organizations, such as Heartstrong, are addressing this as a serious threat to the gay community.

Several blogs speculated that Donnie Davies was a character created by improv actor Todd Quillen or out gay director Jason Bolicki.

On 9 February 2007, MTV News Webcam Correspondent posted a video on YouTube, proving Donnie Davies to be a character played by actor Joey Oglesby. The piece interviewed the actor and director and included their surprise that anyone took the video as being serious.

== See also ==
- Brüno
