= The Psychic Paramount =

American psychedelic rock band

- Origin: New York, NY, United States
- Genres: Experimental rock Noise rock Psychedelic rock
- Years active: 2002–present
- Labels: No Quarter Records; Public Guilt
- Members: Ben Armstrong; Drew St. Ivany; Jeff Conaway
- Past members: Tatsuya Nakatani
- Website: Official website

The Psychic Paramount is an American experimental rock group from New York City that was formed in 2002.

== History ==
The band was formed by guitarist Drew St. Ivany and bassist Ben Armstrong after the dissolution of noise rock band Laddio Bolocko. Beginning with solo acoustic recordings by St. Ivany, they soon booked a European tour with a very short time to find a drummer. Finding Tatsuya Nakatani, the band had less than a week to practice before setting out for multiple shows in France and Italy. From this tour came the CD Live 2002: The Franco-Italian Tour, featuring recordings at locations throughout the tour, as well as a Super 8 video shot by New York filmmaker Aran Tharp. Nakatani left the band soon thereafter, but a new drummer was found in Sabers drummer Jeff Conaway. The band went into the studio this time to record 2005's Gamelan Into the Mink Supernatural, released by No Quarter Records. In the spring of 2007, they toured the US with Trans Am and Zombi.

In February 2011, the band released their long awaited second album, simply entitled "II" on No Quarter Records, to positive reviews.

The Psychic Paramount have a raw, loud and harshly distorted sound to their music, often compared to the likes of Acid Mothers Temple, Lightning Bolt, Boredoms and High Rise. The band have been chosen by Battles to perform at the ATP Nightmare Before Christmas festival that they co-curate in December 2011 in Minehead, England.

== Discography ==
- Origins and Primitives Vol. 1 CD, Bewilderment and Illumination Records
- Live 2002: The Franco-Italian Tour CD, Bewilderment and Illumination Records/Public Guilt Records
- Gamelan Into the Mink Supernatural CD, No Quarter Records (2005)
- Origins and Primitives Vol. 1 & 2 2XCD/LP, No Quarter Records (2006)
- II (February 22, 2011)
