= Blake Fleming =

American drummer (born 1972)

- Born: September 19, 1972 (age 54); Alton, Illinois, U.S.
- Origin: United States
- Genres: Experimental rock, post-punk, progressive rock, math rock
- Occupation: Drummer
- Years active: 1990–present
- Website: blakethedrummer.com

Blake Fleming (born September 19, 1972) is an American drummer known for his involvement with several influential experimental bands, most notably Laddio Bolocko, Dazzling Killmen, and The Mars Volta.

== Early life ==
Born in Alton, Illinois, in 1972, Fleming started drumming at age 8, spending several years in fife and drumming corps, bagpipe bands, jazz bands, marching bands and orchestras. While in the Alton Colonial Fife and Drum Corps, Blake studied under Jerry Whitaker, the East Coast Rudimental Snare Drum Champion from West Point.

== Band history ==
In 1990, Fleming co-founded his first band, Dazzling Killmen. The Killmen toured the US extensively, recording four 7" singles in addition to two full-length studio albums and one live album (Skin Graft/Touch and Go Records). They worked closely with Jeff Tweedy (Wilco, Uncle Tupelo) and Steve Albini (Nirvana, Pixies, PJ Harvey) and shared the stage with Fugazi, The Jesus Lizard, Neurosis, Helmet, Uncle Tupelo, Sleep, Shellac, Agent Orange, The Bad Livers and Jim O'Rourke.

Dazzling Killmen's 1994 sophomore studio album, Face of Collapse, was named the "number one heavy record of the decade" by Alternative Press Magazine, the criteria for which included the dexterity of the rhythm section.

Fleming traversed the US with the Japanese progressive punk band Zeni Geva on their 1996 Freedom Bondage tour. Later that year, he moved from St. Louis to New York City and formed the influential instrumental quartet Laddio Bolocko. Laddio Bolocko independently recorded and produced three studio albums, and toured the US and Europe numerous times between 1998 and 2000, earning Fleming the reputation of being a master drummer both in the US and Europe.

After Laddio disbanded the previous fall, Fleming moved to Long Beach, CA in March 2001 to co-found The Mars Volta, and recorded their very first demo recordings (("Roulette Dares (The Haunt Of)" and "Cicatriz ESP")) for Grand Royal (the Beastie Boys' record label). He also drummed on guitarist Omar Rodriguez-Lopez's first solo album A Manual Dexterity: Soundtrack Volume 1. Fleming then returned to New York City and, in 2002, formed Electric Turn To Me, who toured the US and Europe extensively before splitting up in 2005.

Fleming briefly rejoined The Mars Volta after drummer Jon Theodore's departure in June 2006, playing a sold-out arena tour opening for the Red Hot Chili Peppers throughout the US and Canada. He also appeared with the band on the Henry Rollins Show on the Independent Film Channel.

Upon Fleming's return to The Mars Volta in 2006, vocalist Cedric Bixler-Zavala stated:

I feel as if [former drummer] Jon Theodore's drumming was based on the simplicity of, like, John Bonham. As some kids were saying, it's like Jon was more groove-oriented. Blake can be, too, but Blake likes to flip beats on you, and he likes to throw you off and have fun with it. He leans more toward [the style of] Zach Hill, Hella's drummer. I find myself tapping my toes while I'm singing to stay on top of the beat — figuring out how to [perform] and ignore the drums sometimes, and flow over it. Blake is the father of most of The Mars Volta songs. He's the one that came up with a lot of beats for us. Even on Frances the Mute, "L'Via L'Viaquez" and certain parts [of the songs on the album], Blake Fleming beats [were taught to] Jon Theodore. Sometimes [we'd have] to not let Jon know that they were Blake's beats, because he'd have a bit of a problem with that, since Blake was our first drummer and tracks like "Cicatriz ESP" and "Roulette Dares (The Haunt Of)" were Blake Fleming beats.

== Studio work and collaborations ==
After the Chili Peppers tour, Fleming returned to New York City, devoting his time to teaching and session work, with artists including Evan Dando (Lemonheads) and Gibby Haynes (Butthole Surfers), The Ropes (Fleming drummed on their 2008 L.P. What They Do For Fun, which was #15 in the ABC News Top 50 Albums of 2008), Kim Taylor (NPR Artist of the Month), Israel Nash Gripka, Chris Riffle, The Rollo Treadway, Father Divine, Martin Walker, Jimi Zhivago, Underground River, and Vajra.

Fleming drummed on Kim Taylor's 2006 album I Feel Like A Fading Light, which was an NPR World Cafe "Album of The Week," featured on the CW's Smallville, and was one of Performing Songwriter's "Top Records of 2007".

In 2009, Fleming worked with singer/songwriter Israel Nash Gripka, drumming on New York Town and The Gold Mine is Flooding. Together, they toured the Netherlands and England (where the record New York Town was in the top 10 Americana charts for both countries), playing prestigious Americana festivals (including the Take Root and Roepaen festivals in the Netherlands), and recording TV and radio shows in Amsterdam and London. Their BBC Radio 2 taping was with the legendary Bob Harris, who started The Old Grey Whistle Test (a famous British music TV show from the 70's) and who has hosted everyone from John Lennon to Bob Marley. Also with Israel, Fleming appeared on Uncut Magazine's CD compilation (April 2010 issue) and on the Best of the Songwriter's Hall of Fame New Writers CD (2010).

Fleming played on New York City singer/songwriter Chris Riffle's 2010 debut album, Introducing..., which placed Chris on the 2011 Grammy nominee ballot for Best Contemporary Folk Album. Fleming has since drummed on Chris' two subsequent EPs, I Am Not From Here and Another Dream.

In April 2011, Fleming gave a solo drum concert alongside live painters and vj Lady Firefly in a multi-media performance at St. Peter's Church in New York City.

Since 2006, Fleming has worked extensively with video artist Janet Biggs, composing soundtracks and performing live at art festivals and other installations. Their collaborations have been featured at the Art Basel Festival in Miami (where he performed solo drumset poolside with Olympic synchronized swimmers); The Gibbes Museum of Art (Charleston, SC); Solomon Projects (Atlanta, GA); Smack Mellon (Brooklyn, NY); The Johnson Museum (at Cornell University, Ithaca, NY); The Mint Museum of Art Permanent Collection (Charlotte, NC); International Video Art Fair (Barcelona, Spain); The European Media Art Festival (Osnabrueck, Germany); North Sea Film Festival for Underwater Movies (the Hague, Netherlands); and the Claire Oliver Gallery (New York, NY). Blake composed the soundtrack to Biggs' In The Cold Edge, which appeared at the 2010 Pulse Contemporary Art Festival, and, in September 2011 performed in Biggs' multi-media installation, Wet Exit, on the banks of New York City's East River, along with the New York Kayak Polo team, as part of the DUMBO Arts Festival in Brooklyn, NY.

== Current work ==
Fleming has been an adjunct professor at the State University of New York at Oneonta since 2008, teaching private lessons and running a number of rock-based ensembles.

Fleming recorded drums for the debut album by the India-influenced band, Vajra, which was mixed by engineer/producer Sylvia Massy (Tool, System of a Down, Prince, Johnny Cash), and is slated to be released in June 2012.

In addition to freelance work and teaching, Fleming is one half of the experimental group Future By Now, along with engineer/musician Andris Balins (Sean Lennon, Nels Cline).

== Discography ==
=== With Dazzling Killmen ===
- Numb/Bottom Feeder 7" (Sawtooth, 1990)
- Torture/Ghost Limb 7" (Crime Life, 1990)
- Mother's Day Split 7" (Skin Graft/Sluggo, 1991)
- Dig Out the Switch (Intellectual Convulsion, 1992)
- Medicine Me/Poptones 7" (Skin Graft, 1993)
- Face of Collapse (Skin Graft, 1994)
- Recuerda (Skin Graft, 1996)
- V/A – Guide to Fast Living (Alien Feedings, 1996)
- V/A – Camp Skin Graft Vol. 1-3 (Skin Graft, 1997)

=== With Zeni Geva ===
- V/A – Professional Test Record (Black Hole Recordings, 1996)
- V/A – Live from the Devil's Triangle (KFJC 89.7 FM Recordings, 1998)

=== With Laddio Bolocko ===
- Strange Warmings of Laddio Bolocko (Hungarian, 1997)
- In Real Time (Hungarian, 1998)
- V/A – Live from the Devil's Triangle (KFJC 89.7 FM Recordings, 1998)
- As If By Remote (Hungarian, 1999)
- As If In Real Time (Hungarian, 2000)
- The Life and Times of Laddio Bolocko (No Quarter, 2003)
- David Cross – Let America Laugh (DVD, Sub Pop, 2003)

=== With The Mars Volta ===
- (The Haunt Of) Roulette Dares / Cicatrix (2001)
- The Ramrod Tapes (2013)

=== With Electric Turn To Me ===
- Electric Turn To Me (No Quarter, 2003)
- Clouds Move So Fast (No Quarter, 2004)
- We Ain't Housewife Material, an International Collection of All Girl Punk, Rock, and Garage (Dionysus, 2004)
- Caution: Live From the Devil's Triangle Vol.7 (KFJC 89.7 FM Recordings, 2004)
- Scrape the Sky (Internet Release, 2005)

=== With Omar Rodríguez-López ===
- Omar Rodríguez-López – A Manual Dexterity: Soundtrack Volume One (2004)
- Omar Rodríguez-López – Absence Makes the Heart Grow Fungus (2008)
- Omar Rodríguez-López – Arañas en la Sombra (2016)

=== With The Rollo Treadway ===
- The Rollo Treadway (Rollosound, 2008)

=== Solo ===
- V/A – Drums Love You (Blake Fleming – Chimera, Makrame Records, 2008)
- Time's Up (2012)
- Drum Killah (2020)

=== With Future By Now ===
- Live at the Hamblin Theater 11.18.10 (DVD, 2011)

=== With other artists ===
- Kim Taylor – I Feel Like A Fading Light (2006)
- The Ropes – Cry To The Beat (2007)
- The Ropes – Kill Her Off/After Today, Before Tomorrow 7" (2007)
- The States – The Path of Least Resistance (2007)
- Martin Walker – Nylon (2007)
- The Ropes – What They Do For Fun (2008)
- Father Divine – Father Divine (2008)
- Father Divine – Requiem For Intellect (2009)
- The Lemonheads – Varshons (2009)
- Israel Nash Gripka – New York Town (2009)
- Israel Nash Gripka – The Gold Mine is Flooding (2009)
- Chris Riffle – Introducing...Chris Riffle (2010)
- Anesthesia Lounge – Under the Influence (2011)
- Chris Riffle – I am not from here (2011)
- Chris Riffle – Another Dream (2012)
- A Modern Armada – Gravitation (2011)
- A Modern Armada – ...to the breakers (2016)
- Underground River – Endless Air; the Other Side of Happenings (2012)
- Vajra – Pleroma (2012)
- V/A – Rip This Joint, 2010 Uncut Magazine Compilation (w/Israel Nash Gripka – Pray For Rain)
- V/A – Best of the Songwriters Hall of Fame New Writers Showcase Vol. 8, 2010 Songwriters Hall of Fame (w/Israel Nash Gripka – Pray For Rain)
- Seven That Spells – The Death and Resurrection of Krautrock: Omega (2018)
