= Victoria Montgomery =

American actress

Victoria Montgomery was a theatrical performer on Broadway and off Broadway in the early 20th century.

The Passing of the Idle Rich was produced by the Winter Garden Theatre, 1634 Broadway in midtown Manhattan, in April 1913. The play, a work by Frederic Townsend Martin, showed scenes from a private car, the RMS Olympic, a millionaire's residence on Fifth Avenue, and a Mexican mine with an operative cage. R.A. Roberts staged the entertainment which included Montgomery, Beverley Sitgreaves, and Beatrice Prentice, in its cast.

Julius Hopp put together a cast for The World Aflame which included Montgomery and Ernest Milton. The war pageant drama went into rehearsal in May 1916. The Fulton Theatre (Helen Hayes Theatre) presented the three-act comedy, Her Honor the Mayor, in May 1918. Montgomery was among many actors associated with the play-producing group, The Actors and Authors Theatre, which staged this adaptation of a work by Arline Van Ness Hines.

Montgomery played with Kenneth Burton and Jean Ellyn in Under Cover, written by Jene French. It was produced by the Cherry Lane Theatre in 1930. The theme was a new angle to the sex angle.

Montgomery was hit by a truck just before the scheduled debut of Green Stick at the Provincetown Playhouse in October 1934. The play was postponed indefinitely when she was hospitalized at St. Vincent's Hospital following the accident, which occurred at Sixth Avenue and Fourth Street.
