= Dazzling Killmen =

American math rock band

- Origin: St. Louis, Missouri area, U.S.
- Genres: Math rock, post-hardcore, post-metal, noise rock
- Years active: 1990–1995, 2025
- Labels: Skin Graft Records, Crime Life Records, Intellectual Convulsions, Sawtooth Records
- Members: Nick Sakes; Blake Fleming; Evan Jagels; Jack Weiss
- Past members: Darin Gray; Tim Garrigan; Ben Greenberg

Dazzling Killmen is an American math rock band from the St. Louis, Missouri area. Formed in 1990, the group issued four singles and two full-lengths before officially ending in 1995, with a majority of it released through the independent label Skin Graft Records. Taking influence from hardcore punk and jazz music, the band has been noted by critics to have helped influence genres such as math rock and post-metal.

== Biography ==
The group, named after a character from Lucas Samaras' "Crude Delights", formed in 1990, and was composed of jazz students—drummer Blake Fleming, bassist Darin Gray, vocalist/guitarist Nick Sakes, and later on guitarist Tim Garrigan, who joined the group initially as a guest musician for the "Medicine Man" 7-inch single. Gray, Fleming, and Garrigan all previously performed in their high school band. The group has named bands such as Ultraman, Black Flag, Minutemen, Captain Beefheart, Big Black, Miles Davis, and John Coltrane as influences for their personal sound.

With their early singles and 1992 debut LP Dig Out the Switch, Dazzling Killmen caught the attention of the Chicago-based noise rock label Skin Graft Records, who proceeded to release the band's next few singles as well as their second and final full-length Face of Collapse. The group would later break up in the fall of 1995, immediately prior to a planned tour of Japan with Jim O'Rourke.

Today, its members are better-known for their later projects - Nick Sakes has been in bands Colossamite, Sicbay, and xaddax. Darin Gray was in You Fantastic!, Grand Ulena, Brise-Glace, and has performed and recorded with Jim O'Rourke and with Glenn Kotche in On Fillmore. Blake Fleming was in Laddio Bolocko, The Mars Volta and Electric Turn to Me. Tim Garrigan, now based in Brooklyn, is in Skryptor and a solo artist.

In April 2025, the band announced a series of reunion shows., with Evan Jagels playing bass and Ben Greenberg of Uniform on guitar, as Garrigan and Gray declined to participate.

In March 2026, Nick Sakes announced that Ben Greenberg had departed the band and Jack Weiss would be taking over his role.

== Legacy ==
Dazzling Killmen has been cited as an influence by musicians such as Ben Weinman of The Dillinger Escape Plan, Jes Steineger of Coalesce, Mike Taylor of Pg. 99, KEN mode, Knut, and The Nation Blue.

The group's music has been stated to have helped influence the development of multiple genres of music, with Brad Cohen writing for Clryvnt stating that the band "helped usher in myriad movements, including math rock, math metal and progcore, all the while defying classification." Robin Jahdi named Face of Collapse as one of the best post-metal albums ever released, also stating that Dazzling Killmen "were ostensibly noise rock" and that they had left behind a "fantastic – if largely unknown – legacy in the form of [Face of Collapse]." In 2013, Spin magazine named Blake Fleming as among the 100 best drummers in alternative music.

== Discography ==
=== Albums ===
- Dig Out the Switch CD/LP (1992, Intellectual Convulsion Records)
- Face of Collapse CD/LP (1994, Skin Graft Records)

=== Singles ===
- "Numb/Bottom Feeder" 7" (1990, Sawtooth Records)
- "Torture/Ghost Limb" 7" (1991, Crime Life Records)
- "Mother's Day Split" 7" (1991, Skin Graft/Sluggo Records)
- "Medicine Me" / "Poptones" 7" + Comic Set (1993, Skin Graft Records)

=== Live albums ===
- Lounge Ax CS (1993, Skin Graft Records)

=== Compilation albums ===
- Recuerda CD (1996, Skin Graft Records)
