= Arab on Radar =

Noise rock band from Rhode Island

- Origin: Providence, Rhode Island, United States
- Genres: Noise rock • no wave • experimental rock • post-punk • post-hardcore • art punk • sasscore
- Years active: 1994–2002, 2010
- Labels: Skin Graft, Three One G
- Spinoffs: The Chinese Stars; Athletic Automaton; Made in Mexico; Doomsday Student
- Past members: Eric Paul; Steve Mattos; Jeff Schneider; Craig Kureck; Andrea Fiset
- Website: Official website (defunct)

Arab on Radar was a Providence, Rhode Island–based noise rock band founded in 1994. They went on hiatus in 2002. Members of the band went on to form or join the bands including The Chinese Stars, Athletic Automaton, Made in Mexico, Doomsday Student, and Psychic Graveyard. The band re-formed in 2010 but promptly disbanded.

== History ==
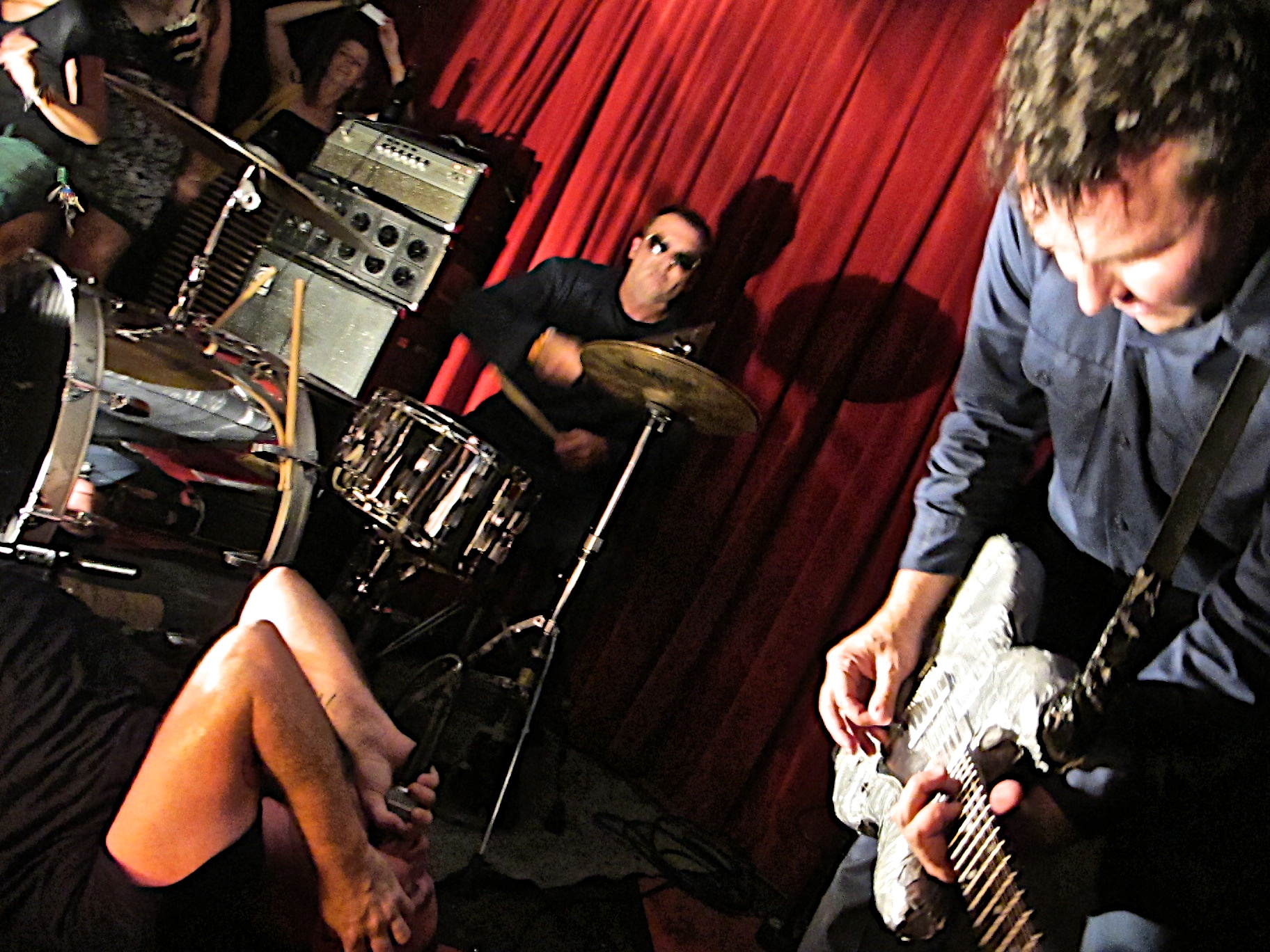
Arab on Radar in 2010 at AS220 in Providence, Rhode Island

Arab on Radar's first show was in the cafeteria on the Rhode Island College campus.

While the band was opening for Marilyn Manson at a Providence club called Babyhead, they were chased out of the club by angry audience members.

Arab on Radar's early sound was typified by thickly distorted, repeated bass grooves, 4/4 drum beats, and two deafening guitars that employed contrasting melodies and near-unison chords that drew comparisons to The Contortions. Their live shows often featured spitting, trisomic parody, and full nudity.

After Andrea Fiset's departure, the band developed a more abstract sound and they began to draw (often disparaging) comparisons to Sonic Youth. Arab on Radar may be considered catalysts for the revival of no wave (also called neo-no wave), a scene that began to gain popularity with bands like Lightning Bolt and The Locust in the early part of the 21st century.

Three One G released an Arab on Radar DVD entitled Sunshine for Shady People in 2008. It includes a short documentary and footage from a number of live performances.

All of Arab on Radar's album cover art was created by Matt Brinkman.

On April 13, 2010, Justin Pearson announced on his Facebook page that Arab on Radar reformed. On April 26, Skin Graft Records announced that Arab on Radar would perform at Dude Fest 2010, with more tour dates to follow. The band did tour the east coast, however they cancelled west coast dates and their new album's recording session(s) for unknown reasons.

In an interview with the New York Press, the band responded to a question on how their politics have changed over the years:

The four of us never use or view the band as a political platform. We like to keep the band separate from our views although there have been times that we've adhered to certain questionable belief systems to get through airport security.

In February 2017 guitarist Jeff Schneider authored the definitive story of Arab On Radar in the way of a memoir titled "Psychiatric Tissues" (2017, Pig Roast Publishing) which details the band's touring, recording, and performing history.

== Members ==
- Eric Paul (a.k.a. Mr. Post Traumatic Stress Disorder / Mr. Pottymouth) – vocals
- Steve Mattos (a.k.a. Mr. Type A) – guitar
- Jeff Schneider (a.k.a. Mr. Clinical Depression) – guitar
- Craig Kureck (a.k.a. Mr. Obsessive Compulsive Disorder) – drums
- Andrea Fiset – bass (1995–1998)

== Discography ==
- Untitled cassette tape (1995)
- Kangaroo single (1996)
- Queen Hygiene II (1997)
- "Swimming with a Hard-On" single (1998)
- Rough Day at the Orifice (1998)
- Split 7" with The Locust (1999)
- Soak the Saddle (1999)
- Yahweh or the Highway (2001)
- Split single with Kid Commando (2002)
- The Stolen Singles (2003)
