= AIDS Wolf =

Canadian noise rock band

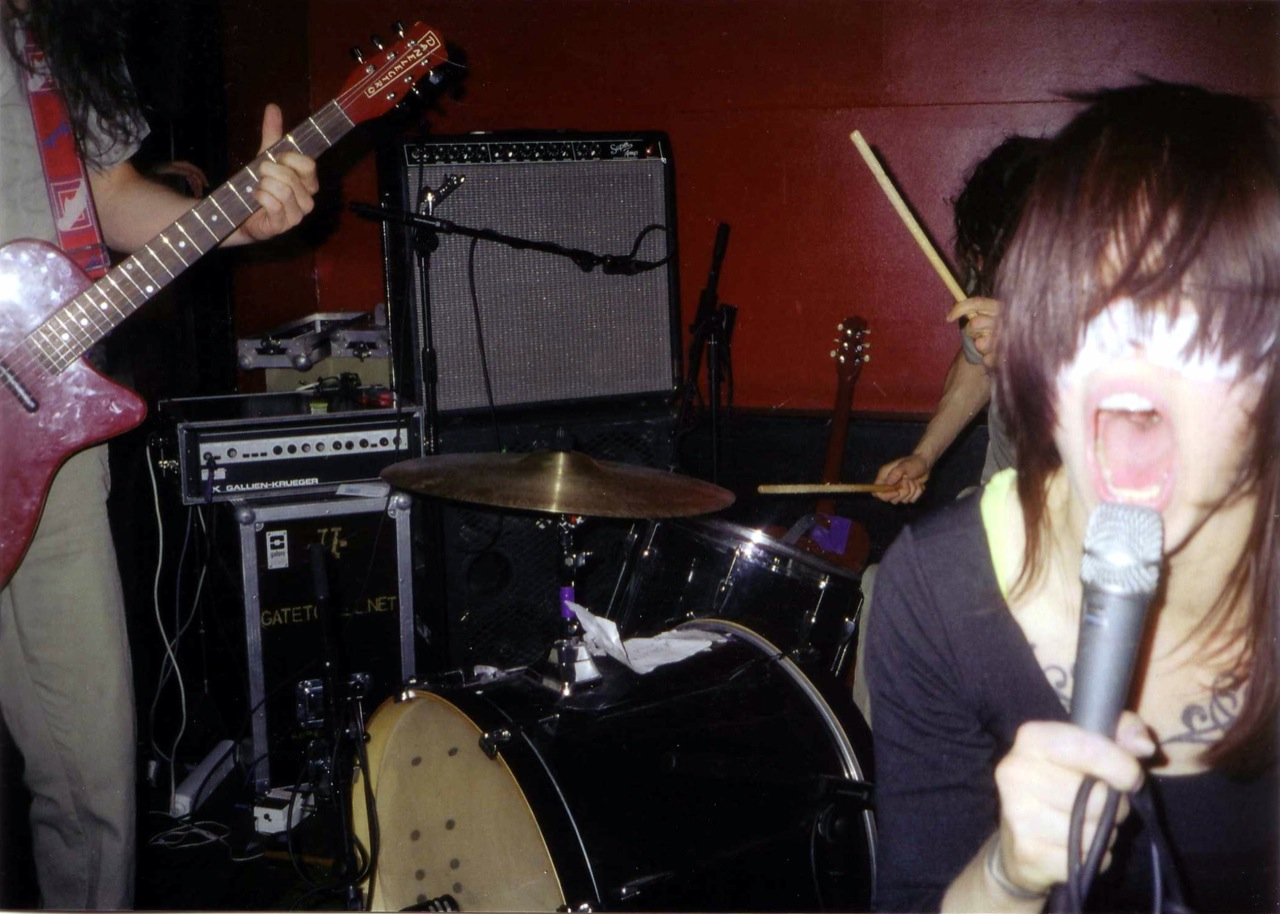

Background information
- Also known as: Seripop
- Origin: Montreal, Quebec, Canada
- Genres: Noise rock, no wave
- Years active: 2003-2012
- Labels: Deathbomb Arc, Lovepump United, We Are Busy Bodies, Zum Records, Skin Graft Records, Nail In The Coffin Records, Blood of the Drash, Badmaster Records, Suicide Tax Records, Kitty Play Records, Pasalymany Tapes
- Past members: Yannick Desranleau; Chloe Lum; Alexander Moskos; Chris Taylor; Nick Kuepfer; André Guérette; Myles Broscoe

AIDS Wolf was a Canadian noise rock band, founded in Montreal in 2003, by the graphic arts team of Chloe Lum (aka Special Deluxe) and Yannick Desranleau (aka Hiroshima Thunder), otherwise known as Seripop. They were joined by Myles Broscoe (late of Arcade Fire), Chris Taylor (aka Barbarian Destroyer), Nick Kuepfer, André Guérette (aka Him, the Maji), and Alex Moskos. The band was known for playing modified consumer electronics and analog synthesizers, for giving creative names to instruments, and for being "weird for the sake of being weird." On their label's band page, they stated "We are a fucking cult and will cause you harm and ill will," then added "The 9 Principles of AIDS Wolf".

== Name ==
According to Chloe Lum, the name "AIDS Wolf" came from an urban legend wherein wolves carry AIDS and pass it to house pets who then pass it on to people, although she did not offer evidence of this legend. At another time, Lum stated:

"My partner and I were on a road trip in Ohio, and it just came to us. It was a universal message. It's a combination of our spirit peers in An Albatross (animal) and The Sick Lipstick (R.I.P.) (illness). It fits, because we're a little bit no–wave and a little bit hardcore, like each of those bands. It's also a message that we as humans must take care for our animal siblings as their health is a barometer of our own survival."

== History ==
The band co-produced the EP, Live Deth (2005), with the American label Kitty Play Records. It then produced a two-song cassette called Freedom Summer, which was released by Pasalymany Tapes. That same year, the label Blood of the Drash released their four-track EP The Fugue. The band then went on tour through Canada and the US, with their reputation for performing in a "completely out of hand" fashion preceding their arrival in each city.

In 2005, the band signed with Skin Graft Records and, in 2006, released the album The Lovvers LP, which received generally fair reviews, as did 2008's Cities of Glass. One critic cited Cities of Glass as being "violent, dirty, and really good."

The praise continued with the band's 2010 album, March to the Sea. Two albums released in 2011--Ma vie banale avant-garde and Live: An Insane and Abstract Hell (Dedicated To Two Dudes From Rusted Shut), got little notice. In between albums, there were several EPS, and split releases with a variety of bands.

The band tended to tour the US only in promotion of its albums although, to promote Ma vie banale avant-garde, the band staged Nocturne, a show with 3D projections (glasses supplied) at the Musée d'art contemporain de Montréal. It then went on a month-long tour of the US.

In March 2012, the band—now down to the trio of Desranleau, Lum and Moskos, announced that it had broken up due to time constraints.

== Discography ==
Albums

- The Lovvers LP (2006), Skin Graft Records (vinyl format) & Lovepump United Records (cd format)
- Cities of Glass (2008), Skin Graft Records (cd), Lovepump United Records (vinyl)
- March to the Sea (2010), Skin Graft Records
- Ma vie banale avant-garde (2011), Lovepump United Records
- An Insane and Abstract Hell (Dedicated To Two Dudes From Rusted Shut) (2011), Zum Records

Splits

- AIDS Wolf/Dmonstrations/Pre/Crack und Ultra Eczema (2006), Lovepump United Records
- Clash of the Life-Force Warriors, AIDS Wolf vs. Athletic Automaton (2007), Skin Graft Records
- Live Dates (2007), with Pre, Skin Graft Records
- Pluck Out Glass Eyes (2008), with Night Wounds, Nail In The Coffin Records
- AIDS Wolf/Satanized (2010), with Satanized, Badmaster Records & Suicide Tax Records

EPs

- Live Deth (2005), Kitty Play Records
- The Fugue (2005), Blood of the Drash Records
- Chipped Teeth (2008), SlowBoy Records
- Pas Rapport (2009), Independent
- Dustin' Off The Sphynx (2009), Skin Graft Records
- Very Friendly remix (2010), Lovepump United Records
- Soaked in Oil (2011), We Are Busy Bodies

Singles

- "Freedom Summer" (2005), Pasalymany Tapes
- "Can-D" / "Chew-Z" (2012), Deathbomb Arc
- "Soaked in Oil / "Foreign Hairs" (2012), We Are Busy Bodies

== See also ==
- Noise music
- Noise rock
- Experimental rock
- Music of Canada
- List of bands from Canada
- Canadian rock
