= The Ropes =

American indie rock band

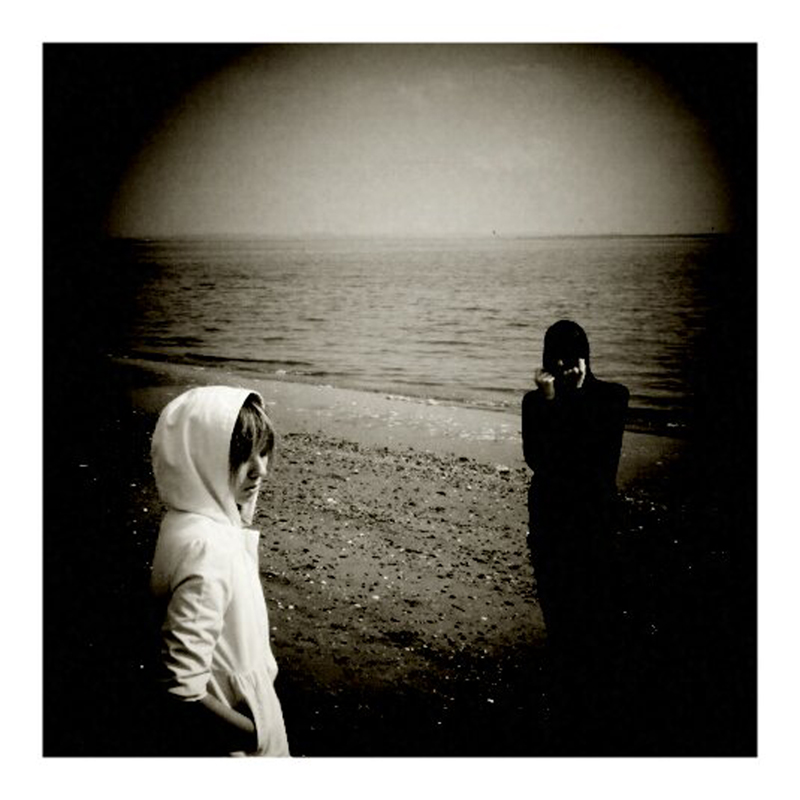

Background information
- Origin: New York City, New York, U.S.
- Genres: Dream pop Indie rock Shoegaze; Noise pop
- Labels: SINLO; Production Dessinee; Cordless Recordings; Rykodisc; Discos de Kirlian
- Members: Sharon Shy; Toppy
- Website: theropesmusic.com

The Ropes are an indie rock duo from New York City, composed of vocalist and bassist Sharon Shy and multi-instrumentalist Toppy.

== Formation and early work ==
Shy and Toppy founded The Ropes after meeting as interns at a record label. According to Shy, "While most people seem to bond over things they both like, I think it was a very long shared list of dislikes that kept our initial conversations going."

The Ropes released their first full-length album entitled What They Do For Fun on the Kobe, Japan-based boutique record label Production Dessinée. Music critic Allan Raible chose What They Do For Fun as No. 15 on the ABC News 50 Best Albums of 2008.

== Releases from 2009-2014 ==
The Ropes released the Be My Gun EP, followed by another EP that August, Clubs in Europe Forever. They released the Love is a Chain Store and I Miss You Being Gone EPs in early 2010. The song "I Miss You Being Gone” was playlisted by Irish radio station Phantom 105.2, and "Love is a Chain Store" was playlisted by NME Radio in March 2010.

In 2011, the band released the Lack of Technology Made Me a Killer EP along with a video that was premiered at the 2012 SXSW music and film festival. The single "Lack of Technology Made Me a Killer" was chosen as Song of the Day by KEXP (90.3 FM) of Seattle. In October 2013, they released an EP titled The Man Who Refused to Be Born. Two more EPs were released in 2014: I Want It All, So I Can Have Nothing and Sadness Is the Rich Man's Drug.

The Ropes toured throughout the US and UK, opening for acts such as Crocodiles, Innerpartysystem,The Bravery, Chapel Club and Sunday Girl.

The band's second and final LP as the Ropes was Post-Entertainment, released in February 2013. In an IndieRay interview, the duo explained the title: "Post-entertainment is an examination of artist vs. entertainer. They are not one and the same. They are mutually exclusive. In a broader sense, it is an examination of the 'function' that music and art play in life. If art were to win the battle vs. entertainment – you would have Post-entertainment. Currently, one side is decidedly outnumbered."

== R. Missing ==
The Ropes started a new project with a more electronic sound called R. Missing and released an album in March 2017 on the Talitres Records label titled Unsummering. Music magazine The Big Takeover wrote: "Unsummering manages to be even more isolated lyrically than The Ropes’ famously nihilistic previous work, fully embracing complete detachment. Musically, fraught guitar and synth textures paint an image of an unstable world, held together only by tightly quantized electronic drum beats and Shy’s coolly dispassionate vocal."

== Influences and references ==
The Ropes have been compared to The Cure, Interpol, Garbage, Poe, The Knife and the Velvet Underground, and they cite 1950s French New Wave as an influence. French magazine Les Inrockuptibles named the Ropes as one of its five bands to watch.

Tricky sampled The Ropes' song "Love is a Chain Store" on the lead single "Does It" from his 2013 album "False Idols".

== Discography ==
- Cry to the Beat EP - 2008
- What They Do for Fun LP - May 2008
- Be My Gun EP - March 2009
- Clubs in Europe Forever EP - August 2009
- Love is a Chain Store EP - January 2010
- I Miss You Being Gone EP - February 2010
- Lack of Technology Made Me a Killer EP - October 2011
- Post-entertainment LP - February 2013
- The Man Who Refused to Be Born EP - October 2013
- I Want It All, So I Can Have Nothing EP - May 2014
- Sadness Is the Rich Man's Drug EP - October 2014
