= Cheer-Accident =

American experimental rock ensemble

- Origin: Chicago, Illinois
- Genres: Experimental rock; indie rock; post-rock; math rock
- Years active: 1981–present
- Labels: Neat Metal; Pravda; Skin Graft; Cuneiform; Shameless
- Members: Thymme Jones; Jeff Libersher; Dante Kester; Amelie Morgan; Mike Hagedorn
- Past members: Chris Block (bass, 1987–1992); Phil Bonnet (guitar, 1993–1999; deceased); Jim Drummond (vocals, 1981–1984); Dan Forden (bass, 1992–1993); Dylan Posa (bass, 1994–2003); Mike Greenlees (drums, 1981–1987); Jamie Fillmore (guitar, 2000-2003); Alex Perkolup (bass, 2003-2012); Carmen Armillas (vocals); Andrea Faught (trumpet); Todd Rittmann (guitar); Scott Rutledge (lyrics collaborator); Evelyn Davis (vocals); Ross Feller (saxophones)
- Website: cheer-accident.com

Cheer-Accident is an American experimental rock ensemble headed by Thymme Jones, initially formed in 1981 before beginning to release music in 1986. Jones took the name of the band from a Hallmark Cards shopping display,

== Biography ==
Cheer-Accident's first album, Life Isn't Like That, was released in 1986, after which Drummond and Greenlees left the group. They were replaced by bassist Chris Block and guitarist Jeff Libersher. The group's second release, 1988's Sever Roots, Tree Dies, was produced and engineered by Phil Bonnet.

Their 1991 album, Dumb Ask, was produced by Steve Albini, and following this the group signed to British label Neat Records. However, the album was pressed poorly and the group severed its ties to the label, and went back to recording for Complacency Records with Bonnet, who by that time had joined the group on guitar. Block left the band in 1992 and was replaced by Dan Forden, after which the group returned to the studio.

In 1994, the group released The Why Album, and helped start a local Chicago Public-access television show called Cool Clown Ground. Albini recorded the group's next release, Not a Food (recorded in July 1994 and eventually released in 1996). Shortly after these sessions, Forden left the band and was then replaced with Dylan Posa (formerly of The Flying Luttenbachers). By this time, Cheer-Accident members were collaborating regularly with other Chicago indie artists such as U.S. Maple, Bobby Conn, Gastr del Sol, and Smog.

In January 1999, Phil Bonnet died of a brain aneurysm while the group recorded material for its eighth album, Salad Days. The group decided to continue with Jamie Fillmore filling Bonnet's role as guitarist. Also, a 1997 recording session, which yielded a 52-minute song called "Trading Balloons", was released as an EP. Salad Days was finally released on Skin Graft Records in October 2000.

The group serves as an occasional live backup band for Harvey Sid Fisher. In 2001, Fisher and the band collaborated on a cover of "52 Girls" for the B-52s tribute album, Wigs on Fire!, which was released on Nihilist Records. In 2003, the group recorded another full-length for Skin Graft, Introducing Lemon, as well as a soundtrack CD to a comic book called Gumballhead the Cat. In 2006, Cheer-Accident performed at North East Sticks Together in Boston.

== Discography ==
=== Singles and EPs ===
- Theme From Shaft split 7-inchEP with Boom Hank/Mojo Nixon & The Second Edition (Pravda, 1991) - "Theme From Shaft"
- split 7-inch single with Star Period Star (Super 800, 1995) - "His Ass Was His Only Feature"
- "Breathing Barely" / "Cynical Girl" (Rampage, 2010)
- "Mostly Unconscious" / "Cynical Girl" (Complacency, 2013)
- "Dragons" / "Kazoos and Drums" (Complacency, 2016)

=== Albums ===
- Life Isn't Like That (Complacency Records, Cassette, 1986)
- Sever Roots, Tree Dies (Complacency Records, LP, 1988. CD Reissue on Freakshow, 2007)
- Vasectomy (Complacency Records, Cassette, 1989)
- Dumb Ask (Complacency Records, CD, 1991. Reissued on Neat Metal, 1995, and Pravda Archives, 2003)
- Babies Shouldn't Smoke (Complacency Records, CD, 1993)
- The Why Album (Complacency Records, CD, 1994)
- Not a Food (Pravda Records, CD, 1996)
- Enduring the American Dream (Pravda Records, CD, 1997)
- Trading Balloons (self-released CD-R, 1999. Reissued on Skin Graft, 2017))
- Salad Days (Skin Graft Records, CD, 2000)
- Variations On A Goddamn Old Man (Vol. 1, Pravda Records, CD, 2002)
- Introducing Lemon (Skin Graft Records, CD/LP, 2003)
- Gumballhead the Cat (Skin Graft Records, CD and comic book, 2003)
- Younger Than You Are Now: 1981-1984 (Pravda Records, CD compilation, 2004)
- Variations On A Goddamn Old Man (Vol. 2, Pravda Records, CD, 2005)
- What Sequel? (Pravda Records, CD, 2006)
- Variations On A Goddamn Old Man (Vol. 2.1, Pro Janitor Records, CD-R, 2007)
- Variations On A Goddamn Old Man (Vol. 3, Complacency Records, CD, 2008)
- Fear Draws Misfortune (Cuneiform Records, 2009)
- Barely Breathing b/w Cynical Girl (7-inch Single, Rampage Recordings, 2010)
- No Ifs Ands Or Dogs (Cuneiform Records, CD, 2011)
- Putting Off Death (Cuneiform Records, CD/LP, 2017)
- Fades (Skin Graft Records, LP and CD-R, 2018)
- Chicago XX (Complacency Records, LP, 2019; CD, 2020)
- Fringements One (Skin Graft Records, CD compilation, 2020)
- Hong Kong (Shameless Records, LP/CD, 2021)
- Here Comes the Sunset (Skin Graft Records, ltd. edition LP/CD, 2022)
- Fringements Two (Skin Graft Records, CD compilation, 2023)
- Q-Pop (Cheer-Accident, digital, 2023)
- A New Ear: 2024 (Cheer-Accident, digital, 2024)
- Vacate (Cuneiform Records, CD, 2024)
- Admission (Skin Graft, digital 2025)
- You Smile – The Song Is Over (Cuneiform Records, CD/DVD, 2026)

=== Compilations ===
- Younger Than We Are Now (Pravda, 2004)
- Fringements One (Skin Graft, 2020)
- Fringements Two (Skin Graft, 2023)

=== Compilation appearances ===
- Patience Is A Virtue cassette (Sound Of Pig, 1990) - "7:05 PM"
- 20 Explosive Dynamic Super Smash Hit Explosions (Pravda, 1991) - "Theme From Shaft"
- Neat Metal (Neat Metal, 1995) - "Garbage Head", "Fat Dog" [as Cheer Accident]
- 20 Supersonic Mega Explosive Hits (Runt, 1995) - "Theme From Shaft"
- I Hear Ya! Spring 1996: The Caroline Distribution CD Sampler (Caroline Distribution, 1996) - "King Cheezamin"
- Neat Metal-Japanese Edition (Neat, 1996) - "Garbage Head", "Fat Dog's Gonna Hatch"
- PHD Rock Music Compilation (PHD, 1996) - "Garbage Head" [as Cheer Accident]
- The Thing From Another World Vol. 3 Like A Big Suckin' Drain (The Thing, 1996) - "Grow"
- Camp Skin Graft: Now Wave (!) Compilation (Skin Graft, 1997) - "Filet Of Nod"
- Music of Chicago III: a² + b² = c² (Simon Seng, 1997) - "King Cheezamin" [as Cheer Accident]
- Pale Incompetence 7-inch single (Bizzarro, 1998) - "Bum Leg Caper" [as Cheer Accident]
- Big Songs For Small Apartments (Lumpen Media Group, 1998) - "Close To You"
- This Is Our Music-Pravda Records Compilation (Pravda, 1998) "Exit", "The Family Business"
- Angular Fever: An Eye Gauge Records Compilation CDr (Eye Gauge, 2001) - "Frozen"
- Keep Frozen (Perverted Son, 2001) - "Spread"
- Sound Collector # Number Seven (Sound Collector, 2001) - "Dream Girl" [as Cheer Accident]
- Wigs On Fire! 2XCD (Nihilist, 2001) - "Those 52 Girls"
- Airwaves For Your Hairwaves: Live From WNUR (2004) - "Manwich"
- X-Mist Distribution & Mailorder (Promo-Compilation Summer 2004) CDr (X-Mist, 2004) - "Smile" [as Cheer Accident]
- The Blueghost Party Favor CDr (Skin Graft, 2005) - "The Day After I Never Met You", "The Mystery Terror Of The San Miguel Apartments"
- Knormalites V3 Posthumorites 7-inch EP (Dephine Knormal Musik, 2005) - "The Stars"
- Download, Dig It, Or Die (Pravda, 2008) - "Nefarious Design, Inc.", "Surviving A Methodology"
- Wayside Sampler 6 (Wayside, 2009) - "According To The Spiral"
- Chicago Grotesque (WFMU, 2013) - "The Carnal Garish City"
- P55: That Time Of The Night (Prog Magazine/Future Publishing Ltd., 2019) - "Immanence"
- Post Now: Round One-Chicago vs New York (Skin Graft, 2019) - "War Is A Warrior", "Site"

=== Video compilation appearances ===
- The Miracle Of Re-Creation VHS (Gentle Giant, 1997) - "Chicago"
