= Bobby Conn =

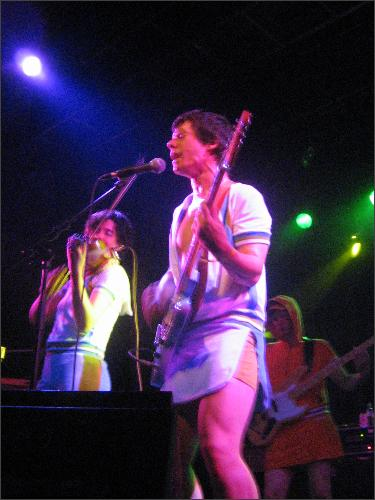
- Bobby Conn live in Vienna with his longtime musical partner and wife Monica BouBou

Background information
- Born: Jeffrey Stafford; June 13, 1967 (age 59); New York
- Origin: Chicago, Illinois
- Genres: Glam rock, pop rock, disco, progressive rock, no wave
- Years active: 1989–present
- Label: Thrill Jockey

Jeffrey Stafford (born June 13, 1967), known professionally as Bobby Conn, is an American musician based in Chicago, Illinois. He often collaborates with other artists and film-maker Usama Alshaibi.

== Career ==
Conn was born as Jeffrey Stafford in New York, but spent much of his young life in the Chicago suburb of St. Charles. He started a hardcore punk trio in high school called "The Broken Kockamamies" (The BK's, or BKS) who were noted for using eight-foot strobe lights on a darkened stage as their only prop. The strobes were affectionately called "the pillars of fear." In 1989, Conn played guitar in the Chicago avant garde rock quartet Conducent (Conn/guitar, Rex Jenny/bass and vocals, DeShawn/drums and vocals, Le Deuce/loops, beats, and atmosphere). The eclectic Conducent sound was born from improv and raised on the "open mic" circuit, eventually growing into full maturity as a performance troupe. Conn went solo in 1994 after Conducent broke up. His first lineup consisted of ex-Conducent member DJ Le Deuce on turntables, as well as his future wife Julie Pomerleau (a.k.a. Monica BouBou) on electric violin. Conn went on to release seven studio albums to date: Bobby Conn (1997), Rise Up! (1998), The Golden Age (2001), The Homeland (2004), King For A Day (2007), Macaroni (2012), and Recovery (2020), along with a live album Live Classics (2005) and two E.P's called Llovessonngs (1999), and Bobby's Place (2025).

In 2003, Conn produced a session for UK punk band the Cribs, whom he met when they were a support band on his UK tour. A part of that session was used on The Cribs' self-titled debut release in 2004.

UK progressive rock band The Fierce and the Dead have described Conn as an influence.

== Bobby Conn and the press ==
From Bobby Conn's Southern Records biography:

He developed the "Continuous Ca$h Flow System" while incarcerated in a federal facility in Maryland, serving out a sentence for mail fraud. In his solitude he was struck by two things: firstly, that his illegal difficulties were due to his focus on earning rather than spending as much money as possible, and more importantly, that he was likely to be the Anti-Christ. Bobby now knew that time was short, the coming Armageddon would destroy humanity at century's end, so he had to reach people quickly. A natural performer and gifted musician in the popular tradition, he structured his "Continuous Ca$h Flow System" [...] Bobby knows that creating a financial vacuum inside oneself is the best way to fill a spiritual void, and he demonstrates this regularly by distributing thousands of dollars in the form of $20 bills to every audience member. But with his gift comes a desire. A desire to spend. And spend. And spend yet more, creating a glorious Debt that promises, if not salvation, a thrilling high-paced life-style. And when the collective Debt of our generation grows large enough, the entire Pig System of Oppression will be snuffed out like a candle in a hurricane.

In more recent years, Conn has been more candid in interviews, and has admitted that all of these early fabrications for the press were merely a charade. Conn told Magnet magazine that "I always thought it was part of the creative process. Creativity is lying. My own story doesn't seem very interesting to me [...] You don't want to be who you are onstage everyday. What's the point in that?" Conn also said in interview with freq.org.uk that the source of his onstage persona was "egomaniacal delusions that I've had since I was a kid – I tried to hyperbolize them to see how far it would go. To me when I came up with the whole idea of trying to promote myself as a potential Antichrist I figured that no-one is going to take this seriously or even acknowledge it because it's about the dumbest thing you could say."

== Protest ==
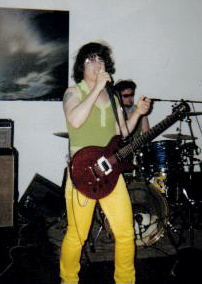
Bobby Conn, live in Zürich in 2002

Conn has said of his art that "All the records that I've done are a critique of what's going on in contemporary America", and he was an outspoken critic of the George W. Bush administration. However, Conn has admitted he was not always at ease with the "protest singer" label for himself. He told Magnet magazine, "I've always done lots of social commentary that I believe in pretty strongly but I am very uncomfortable with the role of the artist as a meaningful social critic...my whole generation [is] a confused group of people with an ambivalent way of dealing with protest."

Regarding his 2007 album King for a Day, Conn said "it's political, but just in a contemporary culture kind of way[...] Two of the songs are about Tom Cruise, and I don't know if there's a more political statement than Tom Cruise. He kind of symbolizes a lot of what's going on in this country right now and how people are responding to it."

== Personal life ==
He lives in the Chicago area with his wife, violinist and session musician Julie Pomerleau, and their two children.

In 2001, Conn and Pomerleau became the first couple who were cast by Cynthia Plaster Caster.

== Discography ==
=== Albums ===
- Bobby Conn (Atavistic Records, 1997)
- Rise Up! (Atavistic, Thrill Jockey, 1998)
- Llovessonngs [E.P.] (Thrill Jockey, 1999)
- The Golden Age (Thrill Jockey, 2001)
- The Homeland – with The Glass Gypsies (Thrill Jockey, 2004)
- Live Classics Vol. 1 – with The Glass Gypsies (Thrill Jockey, 2005)
- King for a Day (Thrill Jockey, 2007)
- Macaroni (Fire Records, 2012)
- Recovery (Tapete Records, 2020)
- Bobby's Place (Tapete Records, 2025)

=== 12-inch ===
- Bobby Conn/Coolhaven (w/Lukas Simonis) – Bigmag. III POLYTOPIA – For The Quasi Crystals (12", Pic, Ltd) Drop of Blood Records 2008

=== Singles ===
- "Who's the Paul?" b/w "The Sportsman" 7" (1995)
- "Never Get Ahead" b/w "Me, Most of All" 7" (1996)
- "Winners" CD Single (2002)
- "On the Farm" b/w "Don't Worry" 7"(2007)
