= Skin Graft Records =

- Founded: 1991
- Founder: Mark Fischer
- Distributor: Redeye Distribution
- Genre: No wave, noise rock, experimental rock, progressive rock, math rock
- Country of origin: U.S.
- Location: Chicago, Illinois
- Official website: skingraftrecords.com

Skin Graft Records (officially capitalized SKiN GRAFT Records) is an independent record label specializing in no wave and noise rock, originally based in Chicago, Illinois. The label is largely responsible for spawning "now wave" genre, an updated version of the late 1970s/early 1980s no wave movement.

== History ==
In 1986, SKiN GRAFT was begun by Mark Fischer and Rob Syers as a small-scale publisher of bizarre comic books and fanzines. Some of its comics included The Kidz and Cynicalmanson.

The label's first record was released at the end of 1991. Founder Mark Fischer said of the label in 2000, "Skin Graft is a comic book company that puts out records. " The label's mascot is Hot Satan, a simply drawn cartoon devil, usually shown issuing the "heavy metal horns" hand sign.

Bands who have recorded for the label include Dazzling Killmen, Koenjihyakkei, Brise-Glace (featuring Jim O'Rourke,), Cheer-Accident, The Strangulated Beatoffs, Zeek Sheck, The Chinese Stars, The Flying Luttenbachers, Lake Of Dracula, Gorge Trio, Colossamite, Shorty, U.S. Maple, ZZZZZ, Made In Mexico, Melt-Banana, Quintron, Flossie And The Unicorns, Yona-Kit, You Fantastic!, Ruins, Space Streakings, Zeni Geva, AIDS Wolf, Mount Shasta, Arab On Radar, Yowie, Athletic Automaton, and PRE.

In keeping with the label's origins, many SKiN GRAFT musical releases (particularly 7" records and LPs) have included mini comic books as inserts. The label has also used non-traditional packaging with some of their releases. The early vinyl copies of U.S. Maple's first album were packaged in metal sheets, and Colossamite's 1998 untitled EP came packaged with 5-inch frisbees of varying colors.

From 1994 to 1998, and in 2002, SKiN GRAFT curated the OOPS(!) Fests, featuring many of its bands, along with sideshows and various styles of impromptu performance art.

In the late 1990s, the label purported (as a thinly veiled hoax) that a European record label named SiN RAFT was illegally issuing bootleg copies of SKiN GRAFT releases.

== Roster ==
- AIDS Wolf
- Arab On Radar
- Athletic Automaton
- AIDS Wolf versus Athletic Automaton
- Big'n
- Brise-Glace
- Cellular Chaos
- Cheer-Accident
- Child Abuse
- The Chinese Stars
- Chrome Jackson
- Colossamite
- Dazzling Killmen
- The Denison/Kimball Trio
- Doomsday Student
- Flossie and the Unicorns
- The Flying Luttenbachers
- Fruitcake
- Gay Beast
- Gorge Trio
- Holy Smokes
- Koenjihyakkei
- Korekyojinn
- Lake Of Dracula
- Lovely Little Girls
- Made In Mexico
- Mama Tick
- Melt-Banana
- Mount Shasta
- My Name Is Rar-Rar
- PRE
- Point Line Plane
- Quintron
- Q Electronics
- Ruins
- Ruins Alone
- Sax Ruins
- Satanized
- Shakuhachi Surprise
- Shorty
- Skryptor
- Space Streakings
- Strangulated Beatoffs
- UFO Or Die
- Upright Forms
- U.S. Maple
- Yona-Kit
- You Fantastic!
- Xaddax
- Yowie
- Zeek Sheck
- Zeni Geva
