= Masami Akita discography =

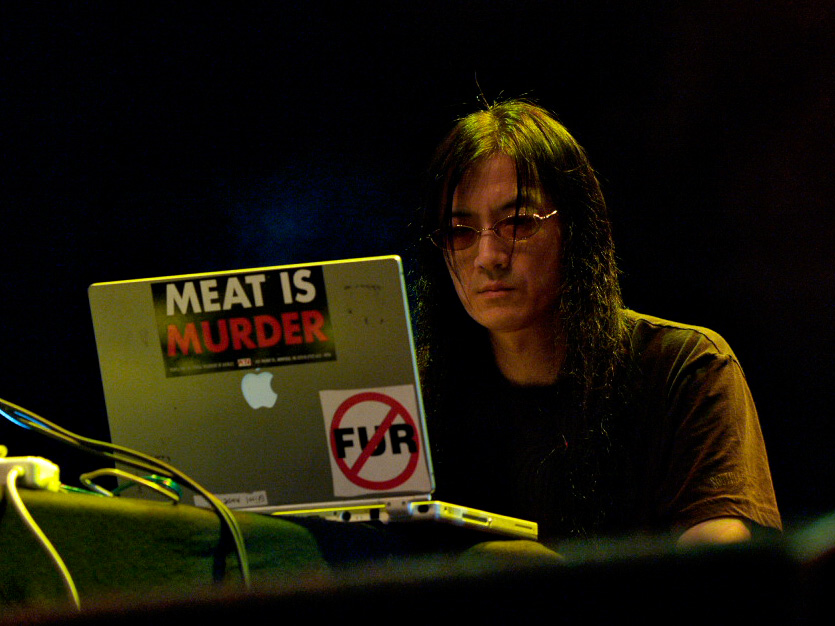
- Masami Akita performing live at Moers Festival in 2007
- Studio albums: 465
- Extended plays: 44
- Live albums: 90
- Compilation albums: 11
- Video albums: 9
- Remix albums: 8
- Box sets: 32
- Compilation tracks: 237
- Splits: 45
- Appearances: 103

This is a comprehensive discography of the Japanese noise musician Masami Akita, best known for his project Merzbow. Since 1980 he has released hundreds of recordings, collaborated with dozens of musicians, contributed over two hundred exclusive tracks to compilations, and made numerous guest appearances on recordings by other artists.

Akita has released recordings on over a hundred independent labels all over the world. Some of the labels which have made multiple releases include: Alchemy, Alien8, Blossoming Noise, Cold Spring, Cuneiform, Dirter Promotions, Extreme, Hydra Head, Important, Mego, Release Entertainment (a sublabel of Relapse), RRRecords, Rustblade, Slowdown, Soleilmoon, Tzadik, and Vivo. In the 1980s, he released five LPs and dozens of homemade cassettes on his own labels Lowest Music & Arts and ZSF Produkt.

From 2009, reissues and archival releases of previously unreleased material have become a significant part of Merzbow's output. In 2018, the Japanese label Slowdown Records began releasing archival recordings on a semimonthly basis, ultimately releasing 96 archival CDs by the end of 2022.

Merzbow has appeared twice on the Billboard charts for one week each time, both for collaborations: Gensho with Boris appeared at number 21 on the Heatseekers Albums chart and at number 24 on the Top Hard Rock Albums chart for the week of April 9, 2016. Cuts Up, Cuts Out with Balázs Pándi, Mats Gustafsson and Thurston Moore appeared at number 21 on the Jazz Albums chart and at number 13 on the Contemporary Jazz Albums chart for the week of May 5, 2018.

Note: Release reissues and compilation tracks taken from albums are not listed. The infobox count includes all aliases.

== As Merzbow ==
=== Studio albums ===
Year	Title	Label	Note
1980	Fuckexercise	Lowest Music & Arts	
1981	Collection 001	Lowest Music & Arts	
1981	Collection 002	Lowest Music & Arts	
1981	Collection 003	Lowest Music & Arts	
1981	Collection 004	Lowest Music & Arts	
1981	Collection 005	Lowest Music & Arts	
1981	Collection 007	Lowest Music & Arts	
1981	Collection 008	Lowest Music & Arts	
1981	Collection 009	Lowest Music & Arts	
1981	Collection 010	Lowest Music & Arts	
1981	E-Study	Lowest Music & Arts	
1981	Fuckexercise #2	Lowest Music & Arts	
1981	Material Action for 2 Microphones	Lowest Music & Arts	
1981	Merztronics	Lowest Music & Arts	
1981	Metal Acoustic Music	Lowest Music & Arts	
1981	Pornoise Vol. 1	Lowest Music & Arts	aka Por#1&2 Vol. 1
1981	Pornoise Vol. 2	Lowest Music & Arts	aka Por#1&2 Vol. 2
1981	Remblandt Assemblage	Lowest Music & Arts	
1982	Collection 006	Lowest Music & Arts	
1982	Expanded Music	Lowest Music & Arts	
1982	Expanded Music 2	Lowest Music & Arts	
1982	Expanded Musik (2)	Lowest Music & Arts	
1982	Le Compte	Lowest Music & Arts	
1982	Lowest Music	Lowest Music & Arts	
1982	Lowest Music 2	Lowest Music & Arts	
1982	Normal Music	Lowest Music & Arts	
1982	Tatoo Junk	Stratosphere Music	with Masaki
1982	Tridal Production	Lowest Music & Arts	
1982	Solonoise 1	Lowest Music & Arts	
1982	Solonoise 2	Lowest Music & Arts	
1982	Zombiestructure	Lowest Music & Arts	
1983	Dying Mapa I	Aeon	
1983	Dying Mapa II	Aeon	
1983	Dying Mapa III	Aeon	
1983	Erotograph	Lowest Music & Arts	
1983	Kibbutz	ADN	
1983	Le Cuisinier	Stratosphere Music	
1983	Material Action 2 N.A.M.	Chaos	
1983	Musick for Screen	Lowest Music & Arts	
1983	Musick from Simulation World	Lowest Music & Arts / Produktion	
1983	Sexplan Project 3	Magisch Theatre Productions	
1983	Yantra Material Action	Lowest Music & Arts	
1983	Escape Mask	ZSF Produkt	
1983	Le Sang et la Rose	ZSF Produkt	with Lotus Club
1983	Life Performance Series Vol. 1	ZSF Produkt	
1983	Life Performance Series Vol. 2	ZSF Produkt	
1983	Mechanization Takes Command	ZSF Produkt	
1983	Worker Machine	ZSF Produkt	
1983	Yahatahachiman	ZSF Produkt	
198?	Erotograph Vol. 1		
198?	Erotograph Vol. 2		
198?	Erotograph Vol. 3		
198?	Erotograph Vol. 4		
198?	Erotograph Vol. 5		
198?	Erotograph Vol. 6		
198?	Erotograph Vol. 7		
198?	Erotograph Vol. 8		
1984	Aerovivanda #1	ZSF Produkt	with Xerosx
1984	Aerovivanda #2	ZSF Produkt	with Xerosx
1984	Age of 369	ZSF Produkt	
1984	Aka Meme	ZSF Produkt / V2_Archief	
1984	Dadavida	ZSF Produkt	
1984	Chant	ZSF Produkt	
1984	Life Performance Series Vol. 3	ZSF Produkt	
1984	Life Performance Series Vol. 4	ZSF Produkt	
1984	Life Performance Series Vol. 5	ZSF Produkt	
1984	Life Performance Series Vol. 6	ZSF Produkt	
1984	Life Performance Series Vol. 7	ZSF Produkt	
1984	Life Performance Series Vol. 8	ZSF Produkt	
1984	Life Performance Series Vol. 9	ZSF Produkt	
1984	Merzbow / The Hanatarashi	ZSF Produkt / Condome Cassex	with The Hanatarashi
1984	Pornoise/1kg	ZSF Produkt	
1984	Pornoise/Extra	ZSF Produkt	
1984	Régalade	ZSF Produkt / Active Productions	with L'Éponge Synthétique
1984	Sonic Commando	ZSF Produkt	aka Live Drum Ensemble
1985	Chant 2	ZSF Produkt	
1985	The Lampinak	ZSF Produkt / Réseau Phallus 3	
1985	Life Performance	ZSF Produkt / Le Syndicat	aka Live Performance Feb. 85
1985	Sadomasochismo	ZSF Produkt	
1985	Ushi-tra	Cause and Effect	
1986	Antimonument	ZSF Produkt	
1986	Batztoutai with Memorial Gadgets	RRR	
1987	A Collaboration Tape	ZSF Produkt / Afflict	with S·Core
1987	Ecobondage	ZSF Produkt	
1987	Enclosure	ZSF Produkt	
1987	Merzbow & The Haters	ZSF Produkt / Banned Production	with The Haters
1987	Merzbowkapottemuziek	ZSF Produkt / Therapie Organisatie	with Kapotte Muziek
1987	Vratya Southward	ZSF Produkt	
1988	Collaborative	Extreme	with S.B.O.T.H.I.
1988	Crocidura Dsi Nezumi	ZSF Produkt / Banned Production	
1988	Storage	ZSF Produkt	
1989	Flesh Metal Orgasm	ZSF Produkt / Nihilistic	
1989	Je Rumpelsturz Desto Burzelblock	Schimpfluch and RRR	with Runzelstirn & Gurgelstøck and Due Process
1989	The Time Stream	Sound of Pig	with John Hudak
1990	Fifty	RRR	with S.B.O.T.H.I. and P16.D4
1990	Documentation / Collaboration	Korm Plastics	with Kapotte Muziek
1990	Cloud Cock OO Grand	ZSF Produkt	
1990	Rainbow Electronics	Alchemy	
1991	Grav	Silent	with PGR and Asmus Tietchens
1991	Hannover Interruption	Dradomel	
1991	Music for Bondage Performance	Extreme	
1992	Axx / Spooning	SPH / ZSF Produkt	with SCUM
1992	Metal Mad Man	Stinky Horse Fuck	
1992	Recycled	RRR	
1993	Batztoutai with Material Gadgets	RRR	includes Loop Panic Limited
1993	Continuum	Cheeses International	with Kapotte Muziek
1993	Sleeper Awakes on the Edge of the Abyss	Streamline	with Christoph Heemann
1993	Metalvelodrome	Alchemy	
1994	Noisembryo	Releasing Eskimo	
1994	Venereology	Release	
1994	Flare Gun	Ten Bob Swerver	
1994	Hole	Heel Stone	
1995	Dadarottenvator	Praxis Dr. Bearmann	
1995	Green Wheels	Self Abuse	
1995	The Science of Dissecting Society	Praxis Dr. Bearmann	with Richard Ramirez
1995	Horn of the Goat	Freek	with Consumer Electronics
1996	Music for Bondage Performance 2	Extreme	
1996	Pulse Demon	Release	
1996	Pinkream	Dirter	
1996	Magnesia Nova	Perverse Series and Staalplaat	
1996	Spiral Honey	Work in Progress	
1996	Mercurated	Alchemy	
1996	Oersted	Vinyl Communications	
1996	Electric Salad	Etherworld	
1996	Project Frequency	A.I.P.R.	
1996	Rainbow Electronics 2	Dexter's Cigar	
1996	Brisbane-Tokyo Interlace	Cold Spring	with John Watermann
1996	Merzbow Loves Emil Beaulieau	Pure	with Emil Beaulieau
1997	Space Metalizer	Alien8	
1997	Hybrid Noisebloom	Vinyl Communications	
1997	Rectal Anarchy	Release	with Gore Beyond Necropsy
1997	Merzbow Mixed Total	Sterilized Decay	with Total
1997	Decomposition	Extreme	with Eugene Thacker and Shane Fahey
1998	Psychorazer	Kubitsuri Tapes	
1998	1930	Tzadik	
1998	Tauromachine	Release	
1998	Maschinenstil	Dual Plover	
1998	Aqua Necromancer	Alien8	
1998	New Takamagahara	[OHM] and Jazzassin	
1998	Vibractance	E(r)ostrate	
1999	Paradise Pachinko	Tochnit Aleph	
1999	Tentacle	Alchemy	
1999	Door Open at 8 am	Alien8	
1999	A Perfect Pain	Cold Spring	with Genesis P-Orridge
1999	Blues Maggots	ZSF Produkt	
2000	Collapse 12 Floors	[OHM]	
2001	Hard Lovin' Man	Anoema	
2001	Dharma	Hydra Head	
2001	Frog	Misanthropic Agenda	
2001	Puroland	[OHM]	
2002	Ikebukuro Dada	Circumvent	
2002	Amlux	Important	
2002	Megatone	Inoxia	with Boris
2002	A Taste Of...	Mego	
2002	24 Hours – A Day of Seals	Dirter	
2002	Merzzow	Opposite	
2002	Merzbeat	Important	
2002	Fantail	C3R	
2003	Timehunter	Ant-Zen	
2003	Cycle	Very Friendly	
2003	Animal Magnetism	Alien8	
2003	SCSI Duck	Fourth Dimension	
2004	Tamago	Plan-DX17	
2004	Offering	Tantric Harmonies	
2004	Yoshinotsune	C3R	
2004	Rondo / 7Phases / Blowback	Sub Rosa	with Kim Cascone
2004	Partikel	Cold Spring	with Nordvargr
2004	Electro Magnetic Unit	Los Apson?	
2004	The Ten Foot Square Hut	Hypnagogia	with The New Blockaders
2004	Sha Mo 3000	Essence Music	
2004	Merzbird	Important	
2004	1633	En/Of	
2005	Bariken	Blossoming Noise	
2005	Dust of Dreams	Thisco	
2005	Rattus Rattus	Scarcelight	
2005	Merzbuddha	Important	
2005	Sphere	Tzadik	
2005	Tranz	Caminante	with Elliott Sharp
2005	Scene	Waystyx	
2005	Early Computer Works	Waystyx	
2005	Sun Baked Snow Cave	Hydra Head	with Boris
2005	Senmaida	Blossoming Noise	
2005	Merzbuta	Important	
2005	Multiplication	Misanthropic Agenda	with John Wiese
2005	Houjoue	Dirter	
2006	Merzbow vs. Tamarin	Artificial Music Machine	with Tamarin
2006	Turmeric	Blossoming Noise	
2006	Minazo Vol. 1	Important	
2006	Bloody Sea	Vivo	
2006	Merzdub	Caminante	with Jamie Saft
2006	F.I.D.	Fourth Dimension	
2006	Minazo Volume Two	Important	
2006	Metamorphism	Very Friendly	
2007	Partikel II	Cold Spring	with Nordvargr
2007	Merzbear	Important	
2007	Coma Berenices	Vivo	
2007	Zophorus	Blossoming Noise	
2007	Peace for Animals	Quasi Pop	
2007	Higanbana	Vivo	
2008	Here	L. White	
2008	Arijigoku	Vivo	
2008	Eucalypse	Soleilmoon	
2008	Dolphin Sonar	Important	
2008	...And the Devil Makes Three	Truth Cult	with Porn
2008	Anicca	Cold Spring	
2008	Keio Line	Cuneiform / Dirter	with Richard Pinhas
2008	Protean World	Noiseville	
2008	Dead Leaves	licht-ung	
2008	Tombo	Fellacoustic	
2008	Hodosan	Vivo	
2009	Camouflage	Essence Music	
2009	Somei...	Low Impedance	
2009	Suzume: 13 Japanese Birds Pt. 1	Important	
2009	Fukurou: 13 Japanese Birds Pt. 2	Important	
2009	Yurikamome: 13 Japanese Birds Pt. 3	Important	
2009	Karasu: 13 Japanese Birds Pt. 4	Important	
2009	Hiranya	Noiseville	
2009	Uzura: 13 Japanese Birds Pt. 5	Important	
2009	Kamo: 13 Japanese Birds Pt. 6	Important	
2009	Don't Steal My Coat	No Music and Olmolungring	
2009	Kujakubato: 13 Japanese Birds Pt. 7	Important	
2009	Kokuchou: 13 Japanese Birds Pt. 8	Important	
2009	Hiyodori: 13 Japanese Birds Pt. 9	Important	
2009	Niwatori: 13 Japanese Birds Pt. 10	Important	
2009	Microkosmos | Volume 1	Blossoming Noise	
2009	Shirasagi: 13 Japanese Birds Pt. 11	Important	
2009	Tsubame: 13 Japanese Birds Pt. 12	Important	
2010	Chabo: 13 Japanese Birds Pt. 13	Important	
2010	Graft	Cold Spring	
2010	Ouroboros	Soleilmoon	
2010	Marmo	Old Europa Cafe	
2010	Untitled Nov 1989	Gift Tapes	
2010	9888A	905 Tapes	
2010	Spiral Right / Spiral Left	Cold Spring	with Z'EV
2011	Klatter	Daymare	with Boris
2011	Jigokuhen	Important	
2011	April 1992	Green Records and Tapes	
2011	Kamadhenu	Hypnagogia	
2011	Variations for Electric Fan	Rainbow Bridge and Phage Tapes	
2011	Yaho-Niwa	Nuun	
2011	Dead Zone	Quasi Pop	
2011	Surabhi	Hypnagogia	
2011	Lop Lop	Rustblade	
2012	Mer Mar	Editions Mego	with Lasse Marhaug
2012	Gman//HJYUGTF2	Midnight Sea	
2012	Merzbuddha Variations	Duenn	
2012	Uzu Me Ku	Samboy Get Help!	
2012	Kibako	Rustblade	
2013	Cuts	RareNoise	with Balázs Pándi and Mats Gustafsson
2013	Takahe Collage	Handmade Birds	
2013	Partikel III	Cold Spring	with Nordvargr
2013	Samidara	Placenta	
2013	Grand Owl Habitat	The Death of Rave	
2013	No Closure	Dead Section / Wands / Cold Spring	with Scott Miller and Lee Camfield
2013	Merzbow Meets M.B.	Menstrualrecordings	with M.B.
2013	Tamayodo	Rustblade	
2014	Full of Hell & Merzbow	Profound Lore / Daymare / A389	with Full of Hell. Includes Sister Fawn
2014	Nezumimochi	Cold Spring	
2015	Cuts of Guilt, Cuts Deeper	RareNoise	with Pándi, Gustafsson, and Thurston Moore
2015	Merzxiu	Kingfisher Bluez	with Xiu Xiu
2015	Wildwood	Dirter	
2015	Konchuuki	Essence	
2015	Flying Basket	Family Vineyard	with Akira Sakata, Jim O'Rourke, and Chikamorachi
2015	Amalgamelody	Old Europa Cafe	with M.B.
2016	Gensho	Relapse	with Boris
2016	Atsusaku	Moving Furniture	with Gareth Davis
2016	An Untroublesome Defencelessness	RareNoise	with Keiji Haino and Balázs Pándi
2016	Kakapo	Oaken Palace	
2016	Hatobana	Rustblade	
2016	Strange City	Cold Spring	with Sun Ra
2016	Hanakisasage	Old Captain	
2017	Aodron	Automation	
2017	Wildwood II	Dirter	
2017	Gomata	Hypnagogia	
2017	Muen	Sounds + Matter	
2017	3RENSA	Slowdown	with Duenn and Nyantora
2017	Alessandro Cortini & Merzbow	Important	with Alessandro Cortini
2017	Eureka Moment	Black Smoker	
2017	Hyakki Echo	Dirter	
2017	Kaoscitron	Slowdown	
2017	Tomarigi	Bedouin	
2018	Exoking	Old Captain	
2018	Hyper Music 1 Vol. 1	Slowdown	
2018	23 November 1979 (B)	Slowdown	
2018	Telecom Live	Slowdown	
2018	Cretin Merz	Slowdown	
2018	Achromatic	Dais	with HEXA
2018	Duo 86+89	Psych.KG	
2018	L'Age d'Or	4iB	with Dedali
2019	Indigo Dada	Slowdown	
2019	Kaerutope	Slowdown	
2019	Agni Hotra (2nd Mix)	Slowdown	
2019	Antimony	Slowdown	
2019	Batztoutai Mix	Slowdown	
2019	Jinrinkinmouzui	Slowdown	
2019	Antimonument Tapes	Slowdown	
2019	De-Soundtrack	Slowdown	
2019	Environmental Percussion Vol. 1	Slowdown	
2019	Environmental Percussion Vol. 2	Slowdown	
2019	Hermerzaphrodites	Old Europa Cafe	
2019	Material H2	Slowdown	
2019	Ecobondage (Another Mix)	Slowdown	
2019	Dead Lotus	No Funeral	
2019	Noise Mass	Room40	
2019	Cloud Cock OO Grand (Another Mix)	Slowdown	
2019	Crash for Hi-Fi Tapes	Slowdown	
2019	Coastal Erosion	iDEAL	with Vanity Productions
2019	Travelling	Slowdown	
2019	Untitled 1991 Vol. 1	Slowdown	
2019	Untitled 1991 Vol. 2	Slowdown	
2019	Untitled 1991 Vol. 3	Slowdown	
2019	Become the Discovered, Not the Discoverer	RareNoise	with Keiji Haino and Balázs Pándi
2019	Bluedelic+	Slowdown	
2019	Phillo Jazz	Slowdown	
2019	Selected Small Works Vol. 1 (小品集 Vol.1, Shōhinshū Vol. 1)	Slowdown	
2019	Selected Small Works Vol. 2 (小品集 Vol.2, Shōhinshū Vol. 2)	Slowdown	
2019	Chameleon Body	Slowdown	
2020	Broken Landscapes	Moving Furniture	with Gareth Davis
2020	Cat of Shell Vol. 1	Slowdown	
2020	Cat of Shell Vol. 2	Slowdown	
2020	Tauro-O1	Slowdown	
2020	Tauro-O2	Slowdown	
2020	Medamaya-O	Slowdown	
2020	Spring Harp-O	Slowdown	
2020	Wa	Slowdown	
2020	Mighty Ace	Slowdown	
2020	Tenshinkaku	Slowdown	
2020	Tentacle (1st Mix)	Slowdown	
2020	Sparrow Color 1 (雀色1, Suzumeiro 1)	Slowdown	
2020	Sparrow Color 2 (雀色2, Suzumeiro 2)	Slowdown	
2020	Process 9611	Slowdown	
2020	Necro 2000	Slowdown	
2020	Pig AY	Slowdown	
2020	Material for Structure I	Slowdown	
2020	EXD	Room40	
2020	Yoshinotsune Metamo	Slowdown	
2020	SCSI Duck 2	Slowdown	
2020	3rd of May Vol. 1	Slowdown	
2020	3rd of May Vol. 2	Slowdown	
2020	Cuts Open	RareNoise	with Mats Gustafsson and Balázs Pándi
2020	Sphere Sessions	Slowdown	
2020	Plasma Door	Slowdown	
2020	Merzbird Variation	Slowdown	
2020	Screaming Dove	No Funeral	
2020	2R0I2P0	Relapse	with Boris
2020	Black Rome	Slowdown	
2020	Electronic Union	Slowdown	
2021	Mukomodulator	Superpang	
2021	Bloodour	Slowdown	
2021	Coma Test	Slowdown	
2021	Hikaru Hane	Vice de Forme	
2021	Yono's Journey	Slowdown	
2021	Feedback Purple Yellow	Slowdown	
2021	Black Crows Cyborg	Hospital	with Prurient
2021	Drumorph	Slowdown	
2021	Ensemble Drums	Slowdown	
2021	Arijigoku (Test Mix)	Slowdown	
2021	Red Brick	Slowdown	
2021	Scandal	Room40	
2021	Kazakiribane	Dinzu Artefacts	
2021	Groon Lesson	Slowdown	
2021	Pi-Eggplant	Slowdown	
2021	Triwave Pagoda	Elevator Bath	
2021	Insect 801	Slowdown	
2021	Kumo no Zettaichi (雲の絶対値)	Slowdown	
2021	Sugamo Flower	Slowdown	
2021	Bit Blues	Slowdown	
2021	Kotorhizome	Slowdown	
2021	Double Beat Sequencer Vol. 1	Slowdown	
2021	Double Beat Sequencer Vol. 2	Slowdown	
2021	Double Beat Sequencer Vol. 3	Slowdown	
2021	Double Beat Sequencer Vol. 4	Slowdown	
2021	Double Beat Sequencer Vol. 5	Slowdown	
2021	Double Beat Sequencer Vol. 6	Slowdown	
2022	Janus Guitar	Slowdown	
2022	Purple Fish	Slowdown	
2022	Beetle	Slowdown	
2022	Seven Sides	Slowdown	
2022	White Bird	Slowdown	
2022	Persimmon Mask	Slowdown	
2022	Merzbow + Arcane Device	Important	with Arcane Device
2022	Animal Liberation – Until Every Cage Is Empty	Cold Spring	
2022	Eternal Stalker	Dais	with Lawrence English
2022	Patterns and Mechanisms	13	with Eraldo Bernocchi
2022	Retribution by All Other Creatures	Relapse	with Bastard Noise
2022	Coda	Bam Balam	with Richard Pinhas
2022	Hope	I Shall Sing Until My Land Is Free	
2023	Noise Matrix	Hospital	
2023	Aural Corrosion	WV Sorcerer Productions	with P/O Massacre and Alex Buess
2023	CATalysis 猫媒	Elevator Bath	
2023	Hatomatsuri	Dinzu Artefacts	
2023	XCIII	Helicopter and Troniks	with Smegma
2023	Unintended Intention	I Shall Sing Until My Land Is Free	with Variát
2023	Coronado	Helicopter and Troniks	with Sissy Spacek
2024	Tarsometatarsus	Handmade Birds	
2024	Gecko Raga	Slowdown	
2024	Tsubute Mosaic	Modern Obscure Music	
2024	Extinct	Cold Spring	with Meat Beat Manifesto
2024	Barrack Baroque	Astres d'Or	
2024	Circular Reference	No Holiday	
2024	Pia-Noise	Sub Rosa	with Nicolas Horvath
2024	Inside Richard Serra Sculptures	Modern Obscure Music	with Pedro Vian
2024	Hatomosphere Variant	Slowdown	
2024	Spirulina Green	Slowdown	
2024	Bon Bullet	Slowdown	
2024	Nine Studies of Ephemeral Resonance Volume 1	Urashima	
2024	Nine Studies of Ephemeral Resonance Volume 2	Urashima	
2024	Muko Pitch Bender	Slowdown	
2024	Variations for Live Performance 2023	Slowdown	
2024	Vice Versa	Slowdown	
2024	Nine Studies of Ephemeral Resonance Volume 3	Urashima	
2024	Nine Studies of Ephemeral Resonance Volume 4	Urashima	
2024	Hannover Interference	Slowdown	
2025	Nine Studies of Ephemeral Resonance Vol. 5	Urashima	
2025	Nine Studies of Ephemeral Resonance Vol. 6	Urashima	
2025	Parakeet	Slowdown	
2025	Rilievo	Pico	with Agencement
2025	Red Magnesia Pink	No Holiday	
2025	Hatonal	Blod and Industrial Complexx	
2025	Nine Studies of Ephemeral Resonance Vol. 7	Urashima	
2025	Nine Studies of Ephemeral Resonance Vol. 8	Urashima	
2025	Nine Studies of Ephemeral Resonance Vol. 9	Urashima	
2025	Mimesis	Slowdown	
2025	Sedonis	Signal Noise	
2025	Sporangium	Old Europa Cafe	
2025	A Wheel of Mani	Modern Obscure Music	with Pedro Vian
2025	Nocturnal Rainforest	PAN	with Eraldo Bernocchi and Iggor Cavalera
2025	Akashaplexia	Helicopter	with John Wiese
2025	Gareki no Niwa	iDEAL	
2025	Paulownia	Sun & Moon	
2025	Any Other Utterance	Honey Farm	with Akio Jeimus
2025	Bariken Returned	Slowdown	
2026	Merzbuddha V2	Slowdown	
2026	Brick Wall Evolution	Alimentary	with Bastard Noise
2026	Ogres	Slowdown	
2026	The Pigeon's Chronostasis	Slowdown	
2026	Epsilon	Slowdown	
2026	Rococo ∞ Echomatter	Superpang	with Kikù Hibino
2026	Synthesis Post-Contact	Old Europa Cafe	
2026	Vapor Hoof	Etherworld	
2026	Bardo Thödol	Modern Obscure Music	with Pedro Vian
2026	The New Peasantry	Penlight	with Vanity Productions
2026	Silver Tendril	Ytterbium	
2026	Spherical Egress	Slowdown	

=== Live albums ===
Year	Title	Label	Note
1982	Paradoxa Paradoxa	Lowest Music & Arts	aka Live at Kid Ailak Hall
1983	Pestis	Lowest Music & Arts	
1984	Live Performance Vol. 1	ZSF Produkt	with Nord
1984	Live Performance Vol. 2	ZSF Produkt	with Nord
1984	Live Performance Vol. 3	ZSF Produkt	with Nord
1984	Live Performance	ZSF Produkt	with Secrets
1984	Fonctionnarisation	ZSF Produkt	
1988	Live in Khabarovsk, CCCP: "I'm Proud by Rank of the Workers"	ZSF Produkt	
1989	Live at I.C.O.E.	ZSF Produkt	
1991	Great American Nude / Crash for Hi-Fi	Alchemy	
1991	Live in Chicago	RRR	with Emil Beaulieau
1992	Dutch Tour 1989	V2_Archief	
1992	Eleven Live Collaborations	Selektion	with Achim Wollscheid
1992	US Tour 1990 (1990-09-05 Kaleidoscope)	Loawai Tapes	
1992	US Tour 1990 (1990-09-07 Bulkhead, Santa Cruz)	Loawai Tapes	
1992	US Tour 1990 (1990-09-08 Armpit, San Francisco)	Loawai Tapes	
1996	Noizhead	Blast First	
1996	Akasha Gulva	Alien8	
1996	Live at 20000V 30 Sep 1995	Blackbean and Placenta Tape Club	
1998	Mort Aux Vaches: Locomotive Breath	Mort Aux Vaches	
2000	Live at Radio 100	ERS	
2001	Live at Molde International Jazz Festival	Smalltown Supersound	with Jazzkammer
2003	Live Magnetism	Caminante	
2003	V	Les Disques Victo	with Pan Sonic
2003	Live CBGB's NYC 1998	Digital Hardcore	with Alec Empire
2005	04092001	Inoxia	with Boris
2005	Live in Geneva	Walnut + Locust	
2007	Electric Dress	No Fun Productions	with Carlos Giffoni and Jim O'Rourke
2007	Synth Destruction	Important	with Carlos Giffoni
2007	Rock Dream	Diwphalanx / Southern Lord	with Boris
2007	Live Destruction at No Fun 2007	No Fun Productions	
2008	SYR8: Andre Sider Af Sonic Youth	Sonic Youth Recordings	with Sonic Youth and Mats Gustafsson
2010	Live at Henie Onstad Art Centre	Prisma	
2010	Live at Fluc Wanne, Vienna 2010/05/18	Dry Lungs	with Balázs Pándi
2011	Lou Lou... In Tokyo	Daymare / SIGE	with Mamiffer and House of Low Culture
2011	Rhizome	Cuneiform	with Richard Pinhas
2011	Paris 2008	Cuneiform	with Richard Pinhas
2011	Ducks: Live in NYC	Ohm Resistance	with Balázs Pándi
2012	Katowice	Instant Classic	with Balázs Pándi
2012	Victoriaville Mai 2011	Les Disques Victo	with Richard Pinhas and Wolf Eyes
2012	OAT	OTOTOY	
2013	Cat's Squirrel	Black Truffle / Hospital Hill	with Oren Ambarchi
2013	Kookaburra	Hospital Hill	
2014	Live Frying: Wolf Eyes & Merzbow	American Tapes	with Wolf Eyes
2015	Live in Tabačka 13/04/12	Tabačka	with Balázs Pándi and Mats Gustafsson
2015	Music for Urbanism	Murmur	with essay by Shinji Miyadai
2016	Live at FAC251	Cold Spring	with Balázs Pándi
2017	1.10.16	OTORoku	aka Cafe OTO
2018	Cuts Up, Cuts Out	RareNoise	with Pándi, Gustafsson and Thurston Moore
2018	MONOAkuma	Room40	
2019	((VIBRA)) MMVII	GH Records	
2019	Kyoto Oct 21 2018	Slowdown	with Kaoru Sato
2019	The KOLN ConZert Live 2008	Bam Balam	with Richard Pinhas
2019	Live at Doushisha University (Live at 同志社大学)	Slowdown	
2020	StereoAkuma	Room40	
2021	15 August 2006	Slowdown	
2021	27 August 2006	Slowdown	
2023	Live at Knitting Factory NY 09/06/2005	Ektro	
2024	EKA Varna	Helicopter and Troniks	with John Wiese
2026	Cuts Cut	Les Disques Victo	with Mats Gustafsson and Balázs Pándi
2026	TripleAkuma	Room40	
2026	Berlin Atonal 2025		with Iggor Cavalera and Eraldo Bernocchi

=== Compilation albums ===
Year	Title	Label	Note
1983	Pornoise 1&2	Lowest Music & Arts	
1996	Age of 369 / Chant 2	Extreme	
1999	Merzbox Sampler	Extreme	
2010	Another Merzbow Records	Dirter	
2011	Kali-Yuga Karma	Hypnagogia	with The New Blockaders and Anomali
2012	Works 1987–1993	Korm Plastics	with Kapotte Muziek
2019	Dying Mapa Tapes	Menstrualrecordings	
2021	Solonoise 1 & 2	Old Europa Cafe	
2021	Gman+	Slowdown	
2021	Flare Blues	Room40	
2021	Noisembryo / Noise Matrix	Hospital	

=== Video albums ===
Year	Title	Label
1993	Live at Middle East Cafe Boston 21 Sep 1990	Vanilla
1996	Live July 5th, 1995	Selektion
2001	Live in Germany 1996	Ars Macabre

=== EPs and singles ===
Year	Title	Label	Note
1991	Artificial Invagination	Vanilla	
1993	Neo Orgasm	Vertical	
1993	Rod Drug 93	The Way Out Sound	aka The Art of Merzbow
1993	Nil Vagina for Mice	Banned Production	
1994	White Blues	Self Abuse	aka Now
1994	Electroploitation	Lunhare and Hax	
1994	Music for Man with No Name	Fusetron and Stuart	with Cock E.S.P.
1994	Merzbow / John Goff	The Way Out Sound	with John Goff
1995	Electroknots	Cold Spring and Dirter	
1995	Wakantanka / Aboriginie of Anniversary 50 Years After War	Syntactic	
1995	Music for 'The Dead Man 2: Return of the Dead Man'	Robot	
1995	Rectal Grinder	Mangrove	with Gore Beyond Necropsy
1995	Whizzerbait	Betley Welcomes Careful Drivers and Oska	with Tea Culture
1996	Red 2 Eyes	V2_Archief	
1997	Tint	Vinyl Communications	
1999	Happenings 1000 Years Time Ago	iDEAL	
2001	Hummingbird	L.S.D. Organisation	
2004	Mini Cycle / Yoshino Tamago / Yonos Bigfoot	[OHM]	
2004	Oumagatoki	Hypnagogia	with The New Blockaders
2005	Free Piano	Misanthropic Agenda	with John Wiese
2006	Black Bone Part 5	Blossoming Noise	
2007	Walrus / Groon	Hydra Head	with Boris
2009	Merzbannon	Tizona	with Racebannon
2009	Tempi / Matatabi	Dot Dot Dot Music	
2011	ZaRa	licht-ung	
2012	Ko To No O To	Retort	
2014	Pulse Vegan	Elevator Bath	
2016	Dual(i)thm	Rehorn	
2017	Torus	Jezgro	
2019	Merzbow i Balázs Pándi	Untimely	with Balázs Pándi
2021	Faltered Pursuit	Sleeping Giant Glossolalia	with Hyrrokkin
2023	Amida	Frei zum Abriss Kollektiv	aka Merzbow
2024	Sandpiper	Frei zum Abriss Kollektiv	
2024	Mukudori	No Holiday	
2025	Magpie	Frei zum Abriss Kollektiv	
2025	Merzlicht	licht-ung	with licht-ung
2025	Kachouzu (花鳥図)	Frei zum Abriss Kollektiv	
2025	Pendulum	iDEAL	
2026	Avian Hydraulics (鳥類用油圧機器)	Frei zum Abriss Kollektiv	
2026	Stu the Goat	Frei zum Abriss Kollektiv	

=== Remix albums ===
Year	Title	Label
1997	Scumtron	Blast First
2003	Ikebana: Merzbow's Amlux Rebuilt, Reused and Recycled	Important
2003	Frog Remixed and Revisited	Misanthropic Agenda
2017	3RENSA fb01	Slowdown
2018	3RENSA fb02	Slowdown
2018	3RENSA fb03	Slowdown
2018	3RENSA fb04	Slowdown
2018	3RENSA fb05	Slowdown

=== Box sets ===
Year	Title	Label	Note
2000	Merzbox	Extreme	50 CDs
2004	Last of Analog Sessions	Important	3 CDs
2010	Ecobag / 13 Birds in a Bag +1	Important	14 CDs
2010	Merzbient	Soleilmoon	12 CDs
2012	Merzphysics	Youth Inc.	10 CDs
2012	Merzmorphosis	Youth Inc.	10 CDs
2012	Lowest Music & Arts 1980–1983	Vinyl On Demand	10 LPs
2013	Duo	Tourette	10 CDs
2018	3RENSA Box	Slowdown	6 CDs
2018	Early Sessions 1979–1981	Slowdown	6 CDs
2018	Early Cassettes	Slowdown	6 CDs
2019	Loop & Collage	Slowdown	6 CDs
2019	Strings & Percussion	Slowdown	6 CDs
2019	Tapestry of Noise	Slowdown	6 CDs
2019	Metallic	Slowdown	6 CDs
2020	Green & Orange	Slowdown	6 CDs
2020	Laptop Noise	Slowdown	6 CDs
2020	Go Vegan	Slowdown	6 CDs
2021	Ship of Chicken	Slowdown	6 CDs
2021	Arrangement	Slowdown	6 CDs
2021	Drum & Noise	Slowdown	6 CDs
2021	10x6=60 CD Box	Slowdown	60 CDs
2021	Horizon	Slowdown	6 CDs
2022	Collection 001-010	Urashima	10 CDs
2022	Double Beat Sequencer	Slowdown	6 CDs
2022	2017–2020	Slowdown	5 CDs
2022	After Hours	Slowdown	6 CDs
2022	35 CD Box	Slowdown	35 CDs
2022	New Ear Control	Slowdown	6 CDs
2022	Fantail Vision	Slowdown	6 CDs
2025	Nine Studies of Ephemeral Resonance Volume 1–9	Urashima	9 CDs
2026	108 CD Box	Slowdown	108 CDs

=== Splits ===
Year	Title	Label	With
1990	AUC #5 Cassetticket	Another Umbrella Corporation and Ubuibi	The Haters and Big City Orchestra
1991	Live Deformation/Holland / Bordeaux	Midas Music	THU20
1991	Ars Elektroica	Drahtfunk-Products	Das Konzentrat
1991	Latex Gold / Latex Black	ZSF Produkt and Coquette	Masonna
1993	Sniper	Banned Production	The Haters and AMK
1994	Metaanalgaaaam / Bondage Playground	Deadline	Black Leather Jesus
1996	Voice Pie	Release	Bastard Noise
1996	Smegma Plays Merzbow Plays Smegma	Tim/Kerr	Smegma
1996	Arctic Twilight / Anthem of the Sun	Dirter	Slugbait
1996	Merzbow / Lasse Marhaug	Jazzassin	Lasse Marhaug
1996	Destructible Foundation / Drain	Self Abuse and Mother Savage Noise Productions	MSBR
1996	Merzbow / Xome	Gentle Giant	Xome
1996	Seven Inches Inside Vagina	Stinky Horse Fuck	Smell and Quim
1997	Soft / Lärm, Hitze und faulige Gerüche	Dreizehn	Kadef
1997	Ejaculation Generater 2 / ? / Emission	Blast First	Masonna and MC Hellshit & DJ Carhouse
1997	Milanese Bestiality / Drunk on Decay	Old Europa Cafe	The Haters
1997	Balance	Human Wrechords	Ladybird
1999	Merzbow / Aural Torture Mechanism	Fistfight and Counterattack Experimental Arts	Aural Torture Mechanism
1999	Subsidia Pataphysica	Manifold	DJ Spooky
1999	Split Series #4	Fat Cat	AMM
2000	Necro 2000 / Reality Is Much Worse	Klanggallerie	Statik
2001	Merzbow / Kouhei Matsunaga	Tigerbeat6	Kouhei Matsunaga
2001	Crash of the Titans	Merciless Core and Napalmed	Napalmed
2001	Split Ver 0.5	Less Than TV	Struggle for Pride
2001	Split Ver 1.0	Less Than TV	Struggle for Pride
2002	INTO111115&111521849 / Mode for Value & Intention	Cross Fade Enter Tainment	Kouhei Matsunaga
2002	Switching Rethorics	Bisect Bleep Industries	Shora
2008	The Celebration of the Lizard / March of the Myriapoda	Dirter	Band of Pain
2008	Merzbow / Sutcliffe Jügend / Satori	Cold Spring	Sutcliffe Jügend and Satori
2010	Oh Lucy!!! / Tipping Foul into the Dirt	Chrome Peeler	The Guilt Øf...
2011	Guya / Greed	CX	Cris X
2012	Freak Hallucinations	Obfuscated	Actuary
2013	Amniocentesi / Envoise 30 05 82	Menstrualrecordings	M.B.
2013	Fragment B / 28th Flux	Menstrualrecordings	M.B.
2015	Level	Rustblade	Askew
2015	Animal Liberation	4iB	Raven and Dao De Noize
2016	A History of Self	Kandala	Berserk
2017	Biorhythm	Old Europa Cafe	Qdor
2018	Merzopo	Sub Rosa	Opening Performance Orchestra

=== Compilation tracks ===
Year	Track(s)	Title	Label
1981	"Envois 216"	Foam (沫, Awa)	Ylem
1983	"Envoise 1-83"	40 Days / 40 Nights (四十日四十夜)	Stratosphere Music
1983	"Kimigayo"	Anthems	Trax
1983	"Awa Dance", "Hannya-Haramitta"	Paris-Tokyo	Tago Mago
1983	"Envoise 24882"	Sensationnel No. 1	Illusion Production
1983	"Envois #4 (excerpt)", "Envois #5 (excerpt)" (with ∝)	Insane Music for Insane People Vol. 3	Insane Music
1983	untitled	Double Trouble	The 5th Column Tapes
1984	"Envoice 14/7/83"	Assemblée Générale 4	Ptôse Production Présente
1984	"Der-Dom"	FE Tape	Condome Cassex
1984	"D.D.T."	Home-Made Music for Home-Made People Vol. 2: "Bloody But Chic"	Insane Music
1984	untitled, untitled	Katacombe Vol. 4	Schrei / Industria Tepa
1984	"Envoise"	Rising from the Red Sand (Volume Five)	Third Mind
1984	"ZSF Product"	Sex & Bestiality	Bain Total
1984	"Amaroxes"	Sexorama 1	ZSF Produkt
1984	"Rape Insects"	Sexorama 2	ZSF Produkt
1984	"Xa-Bungle"	Three Minute Symphony	X Tract
1984	"Heat Obsession", "Sangro"	Illuminated No. 2	Alien Artists
1984	"Astral Left"	Independent World Vol. 1	Monochrome Tapes
1985	"Itomakiei"	6x10=60 Vol. 1	Korm Plastics
1985	"Vermin with Carcass"	Dry Lungs	Placebo
1985	"Akasa", "Tana"	Einsamkeit als Mensch	Technological Feeling
1985	"White Pricks"	L'enfer est intime	VP 231
1985	"Totetsu Pattern"	Musica Venenæ: Industrial Culture Music Volume 1	Inner-X-Musick
1985	"Re-Mark"	Out of Context	Banned Production
1985	"4th Innocent Victim", "My Night of Terror"	Sexorama Vol. 3	ZSF Produkt
1985	"Egyptian Ghost"	The Way of the Sacred	Inner-X-Musick
1985	"Exert "Corruption"", "Exert "Corruption""	Homo Sexpiens Project	3Rio Tapes
1985	"Pinheads on UFO"	Poltergeist I: A Compilation of Mutated Music	Dill Prod.
1985	"Envoice 28485"	Anti-Music for Snobism	Beast 666 Tapes
1986	"Smichion", "Venoayasama", "Small Motor-Byke Accident Wounded Lay on the Road of Asagaya"	Best Text of Japan	Cause and Effect
1986	"Fushimi-Bongo"	Caustic Showers	Caustic Tapes
1986	"So Small Atropin"	Intrendent International 2-1	MAM-Aufnahme, Ffm
1986	"New Wakamatzu"	Necronomicon 3	Necronomicon
1986	"Gamma-Titan"	Tellus #13 – Power Electronics	Tellus
1986	"Kangun no Uta" (官軍の歌)	Sexorama Vol. 4	ZSF Produkt
1986	"3 Types of Industrial Pollusion"	Infidel Psalm Vol. 1	Mental Decay
1986	"Peeping"	Phallophorie	Réseau Phallus 3
1986	"Untitled" (with Le Syndicat)	Helter Skelter	Beast 666 Tapes
1987	"Truk for Microphysic"	Bad Alchemy Nr 7	Bad Alchemy
1987	"Separation"	Die Schönste Musik of Japan Vol. 1	Geschmack
1987	"Susanou (Devil of the Storm)"	Infera Sinfonia	Bruno Cossano Corporation
1987	"Invisible Tatara (Extract 1 & 2)"	Journey into Pain	Beast 666 Tapes
1987	"Anna Blume '87"	Korm Merz	Korm Plastics
1987	"Nirvana for the Seven Sermons (Excerpt)"	There Is No God and He Is Your Creator	GGE
1987	"Toutetsu Pateern 2"	Tainai Label Omnibus (胎内レーベルオムニバス)	Tainai Label (胎内レーベル)
1987	"Enchainement 38"	Les Déportés N°8	Les Déportés
1988	"Environmental Pecrssion #4"	Angelic Tecnology 1	Angakok
1988	"Message from Milton Meinung"	Durchschnittsanfall 3/4	Prion
1988	"Corpus/Economie", "Dead of Michel Foucault"	Heroes to Ecstasy	Strength Through Awareness
1988	"Everywhere It's Machine (Grid Module 3)"	Massaconfvsa	O. Crow
1988	"De-Soundtracks No-1 /The Roaling Steel Monster (Japanese Early Science Movies Series)"	Ne	Banned Production
1988	"Fission/Dialogue"	Zondig	Midas Music
1988	"Little Boy '85", "Economy 2"	Trans·Gressed·Body	Corrosive Tapes
1988	untitled	Transmission	Tonspur Tapes
1988	"Trouble Coming Everyday"	Gears=Sextwo	eMpTy
1988	"An Man Do" (with Aoniyashiagam)	The Call of Madonna Luisa Ciccone	A/I/I/P
1989	"Swap No-1"	Lapse from Virtue	Sound of Pig
1989	"Untitled"	Motop 1	IF
1989	"Live 19/6/88"	Voices in a Dark Room	Honeymoon Production
1989	"Scratchin' S.C.U.M."	Your Biggest Problem Is Behind You	RRR and Tedium House
1989	"Itch"	Neue Muster Volume 5+6	Tonspur Tapes
1989	"(live)"	GX Jupitter Larsen Is a Idealistic Idiot	Nihilistic
1989	"My Rubber Dutch Wife"	Nice Noise Volume 3	Nihilistic
1989	untitled, untitled (with Emil Beaulieau and Due Process)	5th Anniversary Boxset Thing	RRR
1990	"Fragment 14"	Detonator	Bestattungsinstitut
1990	untitled	0607131089	Sounds for Consciousness Rape
1990	"Libido/Economy"	Enkele Gemotiveerde Produktiemedewerkers	Midas Music
1990	"Great Masturbator"	I'm Stupid	Beast 666 Tapes / Vanilla
1990	"Untitled 15989"	Mumbo Jumbo	SSSM
1990	"Libido Economy No. 2"	Network 77	Network 77
1991	"HGL Made a Race for the Last Brain"	Altered States of Consciousness	UPD Organization
1991	"Untitled, April 1991"	Antebellum Vol. 3	Antebellum
1991	"No 3-10 Max"	Ohrenschmalz	Unclean Production
1991	"One Minutes from Big Heart City"	Tawamure (戯れ) -Come Again-	Vanilla
1991	"Hiturbo No. 4"	X-X Section	Extreme
1991	"DC-AC Live"	Absolut CD #2: The Japanese Perspective	Ear Magazine
1991	"Speedback Variation Nr.1 (KP 0BO)" (with Kapotte Muziek)	Motop 2	IF
1991	"Heap/On the Move" (with Dislocation)	Sociometric Test	SSSM
1991	"Untitled/Razors" (with Hamas)	Trans-Action	Divided
1992	"Onorikomorico"	Atomic Zen	Dedali Opera
1992	"V2 Live (excerpt)"	CD Voor De Instabiele Media	V2_Archief
1992	"Man-Plug"	Dry Lungs V	Subterranean / Dark Vinyl
1992	"No. 28"	EARTV	TapesOfPeaceInTimeOfWar
1992	"Suzunne Erica Is Sunohara Yuri"	Melt	Work in Progress
1992	"Travelling"	Noise Forest	Les Disques du Soleil
1992	"Live in Kong-Tu, Korea, 1. AUG, 1991", "Live at Maya Kanko Hotel, Kobe, 14~15 SEP, 1991"	Oh! Moro Volume 5	Maru Ka Batsu (○か×)
1992	"Elysia, Valley of the Metal"	World Record	Alchemy
1992	"WEBO, NYC"	Testament	RRR
1992	"Speedback Variation Nr. 2 (Kapot Produkt oBZ)" (with Kapotte Muziek)	Neue Muster Volume 8+9	Tonspur Tapes
1992	"Holland-America"	Interpretation Serial Vol. 4: 72 Décolletés and One Nipple	Lor Teeps
1993	"Super Head"	Come Again II	Silent
1993	"Piss for Yves Klein"	Kingdom of Noise	Endorphine Factory
1993	"Moon Over the Bwana A"	Land of the Rising Noise	Charnel
1993	"True Romance Soundtrack for Moma"	Neo, Noise Punishment	Kubitsuri Tapes
1993	"NRT"	Redemption Vol. 1 1986–1993	Zero Cabal
1993	"Death Acid When Sex Was Darty"	Stinky Horse Fuckers	Stinky Horse Fuck
1993	"Sub-Urban" (with Arthur Potter)	Of Sound Mind	Godsend Magazine
1993	untitled (with Arthur Potter)	RRR 100	RRR
1994	"Phillo-Jazz Electronica"	Bovine Spongiform Encephalopathy	Fool's Paradise
1994	"Twisted Domiano"	Cataclastic Fracture	Deadline and Lazy Squid
1994	"Marfan Syndrome for Blue"	Eternal Blue Extreme: An Asian Tribute to Derek Jarman	Somnus
1994	"Glass", "20"	Extreme Music from Japan	Susan Lawly
1994	"Ram Me, Ream Me, You Lusty Cunts"	Ne Shi	Banned Production
1994	"Brain Ticket Saison"	Noise War	Mother Savage Noise Productions
1994	"Twisted Damiano 2"	Violent Ambient	Chocolate Monk
1994	"Ooga Booga"	Wohlstand	Human Wrechords
1994	untitled	Mail-Music: All We Make Are Memories	Psychic Rally
1995	"Tiab Guls"	Entertainment Through Pain: A Tribute to Throbbing Gristle	RRR
1995	"Live at Easy Gallery Tokyo", "Live at 2B, Eindhoven"	Good Alchemy Video	Alchemy
1995	"Elephants Memory"	Indiscreet Stereo Test Record	Discreet/Indiscreet
1995	"Phyllo-Noisegrams"	No Machine Is Silent	Realization
1995	"Last Splash"	Organismus 3 – The Final Compilation	Escape 3 Organisation
1995	"Crack Groove"	Release Your Mind	Release
1995	"Snowblind"	The Japanese / American Noise Treaty	Release
1996	"Sound Check for Doushisha University Performance"	A Fault in the Nothing	Ash International
1996	untitled	An Evening of Serious Noise	Statutory Tape
1996	"Iro Moyo"	Disco Sucks	Ché Trading
1996	"Talipes"	Mimikaki	Kuwagata
1996	"Pretties for You"	Music Should Hurt	Self Abuse
1996	"Silent Night"	The Christmas Album	Sony
1996	"Iro Moyo 2 (Colour Decola 2)"	Tinker Compilation	Tinker
1996	"Seishoku Titi"	Great Blue Thing	O'Great Blue Thing
1996	"Centipede"	Comp #3: Lily's S'ghetti Factory	Blackbean and Placenta Tape Club
1997	"Morbid Angelfish"	alt.noise	Switch
1997	"Yahowa Stackridge"	Conception: The Dark Evolution of Electronics Vol. 1	Ava/Live Bait
1997	"Hummingbird"	Four Years in 30 Seconds	Dirter
1997	"Untitled"	Screw	Entartete Kunst
1997	"Kleine Blaue Hybriden"	Tulpas	Selektion
1997	"Decomposition 002.1.1"	Untitled (Ten)	Extreme
1997	"Trade Deficit", "Techno Grave"	We Hate You: A Small Tribute to Throbbing Gristle	Jazzassin
1997	"Audio Pubic"	Rebirth of Fool: Volume One	Dual Plover
1998	"Landing on Audio"	Freak Animal #11	Freak Animal
1998	"The Amazing Maya Hiromi"	Disco-Mortem	Releasing Eskimo
1998	"Song for Fandango"	MIT #01	Sordide Sentimental
1998	untitled (with Monde Bruits and Dislocation)	COS Tape #4	COS Edition
1998	untitled	Audio Terrorism: The Soundtrack for Weirdness and Blind Hostility	Chaotic Noise Productions, Satans Pimp and Heartplug
1999	"Redskin"	Coalescence	Alien8
1999	"Fireball"	Sadomachinism	Misanthropic Agenda
1999	"Ab Hunter"	Split Series 1–8	Fat Cat
1999	untitled	Misanthropy	Adverse
2000	"Motorond"	Non Stop Noise Party (The Death of Rock'n'Roll)	Hond In De Goot
2000	"Routemaster"	Avanto-00	Avanto
2000	"2000"	Immersion	Starkland
2000	untitled, untitled, untitled, untitled	lockERS	ESR
2000	"83mb"	Masters of Japanese Electronic Music	Far East Experimental Sounds
2000	"Gateway to Itabashi"	Tokyo EP	Plastic Cowboy
2000	"Cannon Balls 2"	Aiyoku Jinmin 21 Seiki (愛欲人民二十一世紀)	Alchemy
2000	"Ikebukuroà Dadatexture"	Mutations – Sonic City	Arc en rêve
2001	"Cannon Balls"	State of the Union 2.001	Electronic Music Foundation
2001	"Sound: Papier Wellen / Push Paper into Waves"	One Word One Sound	Intermedium
2001	"Horiwari / Pass By"	Mutations – Sonic City	Airplane Label
2001	"Condition #1" (with L?K?O)	Scanning of Modulations	Uplink
2001	"Pulse Groon"	Megalomaniacs Show Time!!	Oto Genome (オトゲノム)
2002	"Bamboo Honey"	Deprogramming Music Volume One	Sacred Noise
2002	"Flyingsushi_x"	Fals.ch 02	Falsch
2002	"Lux Automobile (Krokodil Rock mix)"	Japanese Avant-Garde	Sub Rosa
2002	"Untitled"	Nanoloop 1.0	Disco Bruit
2002	"In to the Void"	The Void – A Selection by Akiko Miyake	CCA Kitakyushu
2002	"Quiet Men & Noisy Animals"	Open Mind	Mori Art Museum
2003	"Untitled Peace"	60 Sound Artists Protest the War	Atak
2003	"Door No. 2"	Ctrl Alt Del	Nomad
2003	"Untitled"	Frequencies [Hz]	Raster-Noton
2003	"Untitled"	Jpech	Jpech
2003	"Routemaster – Tokyo Mix Live"	Routemaster Remix Project Live	Crystal Eye
2004	"Baliken (Vers. 01)"	2x5"	Punk Kein Rock
2004	"Requiem"	2xH vs. HHR Vol. 1 "Where Is My Robotic Boot?"	Hydra Head
2004	"Fear of God"	The End of the Fear of God	Tochnit Aleph
2004	"Birds and Warhorse"	An Anthology of Noise & Electronic Music / Third A-Chronology 1952–2004	Sub Rosa
2004	"バリケン (Loft version) (Bariken (Loft version)"	Nippon no Rock Meikan 1 (日本のロック名鑑①)	Media Factory
2005	"Untitled for John"	Epitaph for John	Korm Plastics
2005	untitled	Blank Field	Alien8
2005	"Excerpt from Death of 250,000 Chickens"	Improvised Music from Japan 2005	Improvised Music from Japan
2006	"Kaze no Haruka" (風のはるか)	Belly of the Whale	Important
2006	"Oumagatoki Part 3"	Viva Negativa! – A Tribute to The New Blockaders Volume II	Vinyl On Demand
2006	untitled, untitled, untitled, untitled, untitled	Yokomono 03: 55 Lock Grooves	Staalplaat
2006	"Partikel MN2" (with Nordvargr)	Swarm	Cold Spring
2007	"September, 06"	Radio Interference from Unknown Orgasm	Somnimage
2008	"Habeus Corpus"	Paper & Plastic	Suitcase
2008	"Voices of Animals"	Manifesto Rumorarmonico Post Futurista	Old Europa Cafe
2012	"Lostbariken"	Yokomono 03.5	Staalplaat
2014	"Weka"	Just Sign on the Dotted Line	Electro-Faustus
2014	"Extract I"	Sonic Protest 2014	Sonic Protest
2014	"Mix 05.23"	Ode to Marco Veronesi	Agnostic Dumplings Nursery
2016	"For Adult"	NOISE	Williams Street
2017	"Untitled Mix 1985 Part 1", "Untitled Mix 1985 Part 2"	Rebellion 1985	Vis A Vis Audio Arts
2018	"6"	Auditory	Sound+Matter
2019	"Loop 1", "Loop 2", "Loop 3", "Loop 4"	Berghain 09	Ostgut Ton
2019	untitled	Changez Retravaillé	Ricerca Sonora
2021	"Hinawave#2"	Mutants Vol. 6: Home	Mutants Mixtape
2026	"Anestolapas"	Metal Machine Music: Power to Consume Vol. 2	Legacy

=== Appearances ===
Year	Role	Track(s)	Title	Artist	Label
1984	Flute	"Les Honteuses Alliances"	Distruct	P16.D4	Selektion
1987	Featuring		Slicktrickflick	Thicknicksick	ZH27
1987	Featuring		The Impossible Humane	Mixed Band Philanthropist	Selektion
1989	Featuring	"Zur Genese der Halbbildung"	Acrid Acme (Of) P16.D4	P16.D4	Selektion
1990	Mixing		The Same Thing Makes Always Her Laugh	Kiyoshi Mizutani	ZSF Produkt
1990	Featuring	"MMMMMM"	History Is What Was	Kapotte Muziek	IF
1990	Featuring	"MMMMM 2"	Utilities (An Album of Collaborations)	Kapotte Muziek	Petri Supply
1990	Featuring		Interaction	Kapotte Muziek	Industrial Therapy Unit / Sounds for Consciousness Rape
1990	Featuring		Friends	De Fabriek, Andrew Szava-Kovats, Mark Lane, and Gen Ken Montgomery	De Fabriek
1991	Featuring		Stuhlgangblockade N!	Runzelstirn & Gurgelstøck	Schimpfluch
1992	Featuring; Remix	"HRUM", "Murcle/Kpeth"; "Merzbow Transformed Hands To"	Rework / Odiom	Hands To	E'ostrate
1993	Featuring		All or Nothing	Peter Duimelinks	RRR
1993	Tapes	"Scene 2"	Macbeth	Tetsuo Furudate	SSE Communications
1993	Featuring	"Alles"	Peter Duimelinks / Frans de Waard	Frans de Waard	V2_Archief and Korm Plastics
1994	Featuring	"All Set to Go"	Verder	Kapotte Muziek	Harsh Dept. Productions
1995	Electronics	"Live in Tokyo with Merzbow", "Live in Osaka with Merzbow and Masonna"	¥en for Noise	Roughage	Scratch
1995	Music		Der gefaßte Raum	Achim Wollscheid	
1995	EMS synthesizer, electronics	"Outro", "裂け目 Une Breche"	Coruscanto (きらめく)	Reiko.A	Nekoisis
1998	Remix	"National Enhancer"	Root	Thurston Moore	Lo
1998	Featuring	"Rate"	Upside Down	Kouhei Matsunaga	Mille Plateaux
2000	Remix	"(Gloop)"	Bit Sand Riders	Pluramon	Mille Plateaux
2000	Featuring	"Omisoshilu (Miso Soup)"	Gift	Hanayo	Geist
2000	Composition	"Black Mass"	Amsterdam x Tokyo	Tomoko Mukaiyama	BVHaast
2000	Remix	"Hürens Jung"	Musik Wird Überflüssig – The Freemixes	Trickbeat	Human Wrechords
2001	Remix	"Book of Sunday"	Rewriting the Book	Aube	Elsie & Jack
2001	Remix	"Decomposed"	Conquest: Writhe	Burst	Prank / Putrid Filth Conspiracy
2001	Featuring	"Seekh Kebab and Nan"	The Meat and Bread Variations	Jowonio Productions	leohtan
2002	Remix	"CHK Error Remix"	Rolex	Jazzkammer	Smalltown Supersound
2002	Remix	"0.000 Remix"	Inflation (*0 "0.000" Remix)	*0	Mu Label
2002	Remix	"Persepolis Remix"	Persepolis + Remixes Edition 1	Iannis Xenakis	Asphodel
2002	Electronics, composition	"Crack Groove", "Yahowa Stackridge"	Noise \ ... [Lärm]	Zeitkratzer	Tourette
2002	Featuring		CyclOcean	Artificial Memory Trace	Planktone Unlimited Editions
2003	Remix	"Vow Me Ibrzu"	1993–2003: 1st Decade in the Machines	Ulver	Jester
2003	Remix	"God O.D. – Parts 2 (Merzbow mix)"	Storm the Studio RMXS	Meat Beat Manifesto	Tino Corp.
2003	Noise	"Rockets Against Stones"	No Games No Fun	Hanin Elias	Fatal
2003	Featuring		Soun – An Anonymous and Random Compilation / Composition		Gameboy
2003	Remix	"../."	Winter Was Hard Too	h/ybrid s/ound s/ystem	Tourette
2004	Remix	"Janik Top II / Angel Choirs"	Dogma V: Decomposing Dogma	Asterisk*	Lady Godiva Operations
2005	Featuring		Sirocco	Daniel Menche	Important
2005	Remix	"The Inalienable Dreamless (Complete)"	Our Last Day	Discordance Axis	Hydra Head
2005	Featuring		Kommerz – Merzbow in the Hands of Origami Replika	Origami Replika	Segerhuva
2005	Featuring	"Threnody"	Epitaph for John	Freiband	Korm Plastics
2006	Remix	"Agorzbow Merzbleed Mix"	PCP Torpedo/ANbRx	Agoraphobic Nosebleed	Hydra Head
2006	Music	"November 1952"	Folio and Four Systems	Earle Brown	Tzadik
2008	Music	"Umō ni Matsuwaru Suiteki Mugen Junkan" (<羽毛に纏わる水滴無限循環> Dedicated to アヒル (Duck))	Zoundtrack	Ukawanimation!	Avex Trax
2008	Remix	"Cold World vs Merzbow"	Hands Off Our Music	Cold World	Short Fuse Record
2009	Featuring	"Killing Friends"	Our Earth's Blood IV	Bastard Noise	Cathartic Process
2009	Music	"Yama no Kodomo" (山のコドモ)	Rōdoku CD (朗読CD)	Etsuko Yakushimaru	Studio Voice
2009	Noise	"Inferno Nel Ghetto (Xu(e) remix)"	Variante Alla Morte / No Matter If People Die	Cripple Bastards	Power It Up
2009	Remix	"SNOW REM REM IBVZ"	Chicken Switch	Melvins	Ipecac
2009	Music	"Census Taker"	Attack of the Killer Black Eye Ball	XXX Residents	yamaha A&R
2010	Featuring		Mixed Metaphor / Into a Bad Way	John Wiese	Phage Tapes
2010	Electronics, composition	"Depression (Loukoum)", "Hysteria (Palladium)", "Schizophrenia (Silver)"	Metal / Crystal	Richard Pinhas	Cuneiform
2010	Remix	"House of Low Culture Remix"	Housing Tracts	House of Low Culture	SIGE
2011	Arranging, mixing	"Land"	Alchemic Heart	Vampillia	Important
2011	Remix	"Maguro (Merzbow remix)"	Bo Ningen	Bo Ningen	Knew Noise
2011	Remix	"Dynamite Music (Merzbow RMX)"	EDGE OF CHAOS reCONSTRUCTION / LIVE&REMIXXX	Wrench	Blues Interactions
2011	Remix	"Versprochen (Merzbow-Remix)"	.Käfer.Maden.Würmer.Spinnen.	Samsas Traum vs. Weena Morloch	Trisol
2012	Remix	"Sudden Moment (Merzbow remix)"	The Cherry Thing Remixes	Neneh Cherry and The Thing	Smalltown Supersound
2013	Noise	"Mutations"	Error 500	Mutation	PledgeMusic
2014	Loops, noise, effects		Tikkun	Richard Pinhas & Oren Ambarchi	Cuneiform
2014	Composition	"Dissolution" (解散)	Dissolution	Sick/Tired	A389
2015	Remix	"Parricide Agent Service (Merzbow remix by Masami Akita)"	Bodies	Endon	Daymare
2017	Remix	"Bleed Like You (Merzbow)"	The Great Corrupter	Mortiis	Omnipresence
2017	Electronics	"Stigmata", "Corpus"	Black Dawn	Phallus Dei	Dark Vinyl
2017	Featuring	"At the Road's End"	Sol	Seeming	Artoffact
2017	Remix	"Perks of Being a Perv (Merzbow remix)"	Carving Songs	Controlled Bleeding	Artoffact
2018	Featuring	"Ambient Red"	Silence Will Speak	Gezan	Jūsangatsu no Mushi (十三月の甲虫)
2019	Featuring	"Nothing Is Forgotten, Nothing Is Forgiven"	Nothing Is Forgotten, Nothing Is Forgiven	The Empire Line	
2019	Featuring	"mybodyisnotwhole"	AngelMaker	AngelMaker	Angelmakermusic
2020	Remix	"Gargouille (Merzbow remix)"	Peculiar	Kentaro Hayashi	Slowdown
2021	Remix	"[Merzbow remix] Frayed Life / Musty Basement / Lack / Not Exist"	Rotten Miso	Juri Suzue	Remodel
2026	Featuring	"The Vanity Project"	The Vanity Project	Vanity Productions	Northern Electronics

== As Masami Akita ==
=== Studio albums ===
Year	Title	Label	Note
1987	Collaboration Through the Mail 1983/84	DMA2	with Jean-Louis Houchard
1997	The Prosperity of Vice, the Misfortune of Virtue: Electro-Music for Romantica	I	
1997	Ich schnitt mich in den Finger	Mego	with Reiko Azuma, Russell Haswell, and Tetsuo Sakaibara
2002	Satanstornade	Warp	with Russell Haswell
2011	One Bird Two Bird	Editions Mego	with Mats Gustafsson and Jim O'Rourke
2014	The Black Album	Tourette	with John Duncan
2016	Kouen Kyoudai (公園兄弟)	Editions Mego	with Eiko Ishibashi
2016	Wattle	Elevator Bath	
2016	Process and Reality	Cuneiform	with Richard Pinhas and Tatsuya Yoshida

=== Compilation tracks ===
Year	Track(s)	Title	Label	Note
1983	"T.V.Ring"	Lucky Bag Tape	The 5th Column Tapes	
1983	untitled	Mail Music Project	Armadio Officina Audio Editions	
1983	"Fun in Thibet Pt 1"	OSLWMMGIB?	Sex on Sunday	
1984	"Music for Wall 627"	International Experimental Audio Communication Compilation N° 2	3Rio Tapes	
1986	untitled	Blue Camel	Audio Edition Augustfehn	
1988	untitled, untitled	Lost Trax	STI	with Reiko.A
1990	untitled	0607131089	Sounds for Consciousness Rape	with GX Jupitter-Larsen
1993	untitled	Gomi-Akta	Coquette	
1999	"The Full Tide in Crimson"	Modulation & Transformation 4	Mille Plateaux	with Kouhei Matsunaga

=== Appearances ===
Year	Role	Track(s)	Title	Artist	Label
1982	Featuring		The Cop Killers	The Cop Killers	Trax
1983	Additional vocals, tapes		Will	Hunting Lodge	S/M Operations
1990	Music		Mirror Pulse	John Duncan	Extreme
1991	Drums	"Live 910608"	Windom	Hijokaidan	Alchemy
1992	Drums	"Noisedelicatessen", "Kept Waiting So Long – Live at Antiknock 920613"	The Neverending Story of the King of Noise (雑音伝説)	Hijokaidan	Alchemy
1993	Drums	"Live at La Mama 22 Apr 1993"	Kingdom of Noise	Hijokaidan	Endorphine Factory
1993	Drums	"Cancer of Music"	Dedication -Zweite Auslese-	Hijokaidan	Artware Production
1994	Featuring	untitled	Junkie	Meat Shop	Deadline
1995	EMS synthesizer, metal	"Dang Dong"	Dang Dong	Hanayo	Media Remoras
1996	Featuring		Nation of Rhythm Slaves	Violent Onsen Geisha	Rail
1997	Drums		Ferocity of Practical Life	Hijokaidan	Fourth Dimension
1997	Drums		Sound of the Sea	Hijokaidan	Xn
1997	Drums	"What a Nuisance!"	Noise from Trading Cards	Hijokaidan	Alchemy
1997	Featuring	"Nikola Tesla"	Jouhou	Discordance Axis	Devour
1997	Featuring	"A Leaden Stride to Nowhere"	Necropolitan	Discordance Axis	HG Fact
1998	Remix	"Surfing with Carl Palmer"	INONOUT	Surfers of Romantica	ZK
1999	Featuring	untitled, untitled	Ins Gefängnis geworfene blind Sklaven	Enema Syringe	Selfish and Mondo
1999	Recording	"Hallelujah"	Monde Bruits	Monde Bruits	Alchemy
2000	Performer		Mort Aux Vaches: Meltdown of Control	Senssurround Orchestra	Mort Aux Vaches
2000	Electronics	"Shikyū to Hito" (子宮と人)	Big Boobs	Miki Sawaguchi	Alchemy
2000	Macintosh	"Shikyū to Hito (remix)" (子宮と人 (remix))	Uterus and Human	Miki Sawaguchi, Jojo Hiroshige, and Masahiko Ohno	Alchemy
2001	EMS synthesizer	"Serene"	Flutter	Otomo Yoshihide's New Jazz Quintet	Tzadik
2002	Powerbook	"Wareruraido" (ワレルライド)	Heavy Rocks	Boris	Quattro/UK Discs
2002	Mixing	"O))) Bow 1", "O))) Bow 2"	Flight of the Behemoth	Sunn O)))	Southern Lord / Bisect Bleep Industries
2006	Noise	"Part IV"	Hidden Doors	The Missing Ensemble	Mondes Elliptiques
2006	Performer	"Live @ Sonar 2000, Barcelona, 06.16.00"	Absolute Noise Ensemble	Francisco López	Blossoming Noise
2007	Electronics, mixing, recording	"O))) Bow 3", "O))) Bow 4"	Flight of the Behemoth	Sunn O)))	Daymare
2008	Drums	"1992.9.19 at Shinjuku ANTIKNOCK, Tokyo"	Legendary Live Collection of Hijokaidan Vol. 4	Hijokaidan	Alchemy
2008	Drums	"Live at Mount Fuji Rock Festival 2001"	Sixteen Years of Video Material	Alec Empire	Monitorpop
2012	Electric percussion	"Yumbo"	Mimi-Nuki: Secondary Works of Satoshi Sonoda 1982–1989 (耳抜き)	Satoshi Sonoda	P.S.F.
2017	Analog synths		Reverse	Richard Pinhas	Bureau B
2017	Electronics	"Memories in My Pentagram", "Electronic Impromptu in E-flat Minor"	Magnetic	Gaudi	RareNoise

== As 3RENSA ==
with Duenn and Nyantora

Studio albums

Year	Title	Label
2018	Redrum	Slowdown / Entr'acte
2020	Another World	Room40
2022	3D	Fallen Moon

Live albums

Year	Title	Label	Note
2020	space_echo by HardcoreAmbience	P-Vine	with Matsuo Ohno

== As Abe Sada ==
with S.M.U.T.

EPs and singles

Year	Title	Label
1994	Original Body Kingdom / Gala Abe Sada 1936	Stomach Ache

Compilation tracks

Year	Track(s)	Title	Label
1998	untitled	RRR 500	RRR

== As Bustmonsters ==
with Zev Asher, Shohei Iwasaki, Fumio Kosakai, Masahiko Ohno, Tetsuo Sakaibara, and Yamazaki Maso

EPs and singles

Year	Title	Label
1992	Weedhead E.P.	Wild West

Splits

Year	Title	Label	Note
1993	Whitehouse / You Don't Have to Say Please	RRR	Xper Xr

Compilation tracks

Year	Track(s)	Title	Label
1992	"Live at Donzokohouse, Kyoto, 14.DEC, 1991"	Oh! Moro Volume 5	Maru Ka Batsu (○か×)

== As Flying Testicle ==
with Zev Asher and Yamazaki Maso

Studio albums

Year	Title	Label
1993	Space Desia	Charnel

EPs and singles

Year	Title	Label
1992	Lamerican Sextom	ZSF Produkt

Compilation tracks

Year	Track(s)	Title	Label
1993	"Testicle Rider"	Come Again II	Silent

== As House Hunt Hussies ==
Compilation tracks

Year	Track(s)	Title	Label
1984	"Shagging Cherri"	Sexorama 1	ZSF Produkt

== As Kikuri ==
with Keiji Haino

Live albums

Year	Title	Label
2008	Pulverized Purple	Les Disques Victo

== As Maldoror ==
with Mike Patton

Studio albums

Year	Title	Label
1999	She	Ipecac

== As MAZK ==
with Zbigniew Karkowski

Studio albums

Year	Title	Label	Note
1998	Sound Pressure Level	Or	aka SPL

Live albums

Year	Title	Label
2001	Yushima no Shiraume (湯島の白梅)	Tigerbeat6
2001	MAZK (不味苦)	Noise Asia
2005	In Real Time	Ytterbium

Video albums

Year	Title	Label	Note
2005	Equilibratura Elettronica	AV	with Ogino Knauss

Compilation tracks

Year	Track(s)	Title	Label
2003	"Not Knowing What Is and Is Not"	OR MD comp	Or
2014	"Untitled Mix"	No Bullshit: A Sonic Tribute to Zbigniew Karkowski (1958-2013)	SOMN

Appearances

Year	Role	Track(s)	Title	Artist	Label
2005	Music	"Mental"	3plicity	Ogino Knauss	AV

== As Merzbow Null ==
with Kiyoshi Mizutani, Kazuyuki Kishino, Yuji Okano, and others

Live albums

Year	Title	Label	Note
1983	Darh Eroc Evil	ZSF Produkt / Nux Organization	
1983	Yapnord Rasa	ZSF Produkt	
1983	Falso 800	ZSF Produkt	
1983	Mondo Bizzaro	ZSF Produkt	with Tetsuo Furudate
1983	Babilonia	ZSF Produkt	
1984	Numen Quad Habitat Simulacro / Punka Overie	ZSF Produkt	with Tibeta Ubik
1984	Tokyo 260384	ZSF Produkt	
1984	Live Documental	ZSF Produkt	
1984	Zeekfeedz Acme	ZSF Produkt	
1984	Das	ZSF Produkt / Nux Organization	
1984	Tentatool Komestool	ZSF Produkt	
1984	Deus Irae	ZSF Produkt	
1984	Sonic Command & Sculpture	ZSF Produkt	with Hideharu Suzuki
1984	B-Semi Live	ZSF Produkt	with Nord
1984	Merzbow Null & Produktion	ZSF Produkt	with Produktion
1984	Disembody	ZSF Produkt / Nux Organization	with The Hanatarashi

== As Pornoise ==
Compilation tracks

Year	Track(s)	Title	Label
1984	"New Cunts"	Sexorama 2	ZSF Produkt

== As Satanstornade ==
with Russell Haswell. They later released the album Satanstornade under their real names.

Live albums

Year	Title	Label
2000	Live at the Neils Yard Rough Trade Shop London	Falsch

Compilation tracks

Year	Track(s)	Title	Label
1999	"01.DAT.128.mp3", "03.DAT.128.mp3"	Falsch	Falsch
2002	"Enhanced Amalgamated Computer Experience"	All Tomorrow's Parties 1.1	ATP

== As SCUM ==
Studio albums

Year	Title	Label	Note
1989	Scissors for Cutting Merzbow	ZSF Produkt	
1989	Severances	Discordia/Concordia and ZSF Produkt	
1989	Scan Has Undergone Several Minor Revisions	ZSF Produkt / Seiten Sprung Aufnahmen	
1990	Steel Cum	ZSF Produkt	
1992	Axx / Spooning	SPH / ZSF Produkt	with Merzbow

Compilation tracks

Year	Track(s)	Title	Label
1989	"Rute No.-1"	Rectangle Overtures	Ache

== As Secrets ==
with Tetsuya Mugishima

Studio albums

Year	Title	Label
1983	Live Numbers in Studio	Stratosphere Music

Live albums

Year	Title	Label	Note
1983	Live at Club 49 Vol. 1	Stratosphere Music	
1983	Live at Club 49 Vol. 2	Stratosphere Music	
1984	Live Performance	ZSF Produkt	with Merzbow

== As Tibeta Ubik ==
with Kazuyuki Kishino

Live albums

Year	Title	Label	Note
1984	Twilight Oaum	ZSF Produkt	
1984	2	ZSF Produkt	
1984	3	ZSF Produkt	
1984	Numen Quad Habitat Simulacro / Punka Overie	ZSF Produkt	with Merzbow Null

Compilation tracks

Year	Track(s)	Title	Label
1985	"N.A.M 24"	Overload Extasya	Nux Organization

== As True Romance ==
with Tetsuo Sakaibara and Toshiyuki Seido

Studio albums

Year	Title	Label
1997	Music of True Romance for Hyper Meat Performance	Membrum Debile Propaganda

Video albums

Year	Title	Label
1992	Blood Orgy of the She Dolls	ZSF Produkt
1992	Live at Mandala 2	ZSF Produkt
1992	Live at Moma	ZSF Produkt
1992	Live at Nice, France	ZSF Produkt
1992	Pleasure Room of Anti Education	ZSF Produkt

Compilation tracks

Year	Track(s)	Title	Label
1995	"Live at P3 Art & Environment"	Macrocephalous Compost II°	Old Europa Cafe
1995	"Electronic Love Medical"	Pathological Resonance	Anomalous

== As Universal Indians ==
with Tetsuo Sakaibara

Live albums

Year	Title	Label	Note
1999	Live at Liquid Room 2.22.1997	Zero Gravity	with Crystal Fist

== Forthcoming ==
Title	Label	Note
Electro Magnetic Unit	No Holiday	2×LP reissue
Fuego Eterno	Aurora Central	2×LP scheduled for November 2026
Granular Ghost	SPH / Thisco	CD
KLVKAR RITVL	Frei zum Abriss Kollektiv	3" lathe cut
Produktion – Merzbow/Null	Menstrualrecording	CD reissue
