= Zev Asher =

Canadian experimental musician and film director

- Born: May 9, 1963; Montreal, Quebec, Canada
- Died: August 7, 2013 (aged 50); Montreal, Quebec, Canada
- Known for: Documentary film, noise music
- Website: web.archive.org/web/20130815074236/http://roughage.org:80/

Zev Asher (May 9, 1963 – August 7, 2013) was a Canadian experimental musician and documentary film maker.

== Biography ==
Born in Montreal, Quebec, to a Jewish family. His father, Stanley Asher, was a compulsive collector of popular cultural artefacts, and a mountain of it occupied the basement of the family home. Zev would mine the ephemera; from the pile he found a frame of reference for the media critique implicit in his pioneering noise and multimedia performance group Roughage. He attended M.I.N.D. high school and in 1986 entered the film studies program at Concordia University. He dropped out after being given his first assignment; an essay on 'Les Unes et Les Autres' by Claude Lelouch. He fronted several bands in the city's no wave/punk scene of the early 1980s that he, along with Tim Olive, later revisited in the early 1990s as Nimrod.

Living in Japan with Leah Singer from 1985 to 1987, he became acquainted with the denizens of Tokyo's burgeoning noise scene. Through friendships and collaborations with the artist John Duncan and the noise musician Masami Akita, he performed in several noise super-groups that were spin-offs from Akita's Merzbow project – including Bustmonsters and Flying Testicle. His Roughage project began here. Using a four-track tape recorder, he developed techniques for collaging sound recordings. He produced micro editions of these audio cassette collages that were distributed through friends and specialty record stores in Tokyo. A handmade collage was included with each cassette copy. Working with the experimental filmmaker, Mark Nugent, Zev enlarged the scope of Roughage into the multimedia performance unit that included contributions and collaborations with other artists, including Willy Le Maitre and Eric Vasseur. Roughage performances took place throughout Canada, Japan and Europe from the late 1980s to the late 1990s.

During one Roughage tour of the newly minted state of Croatia in 1995, he documented and interviewed artists that he met. These interviews provided the basis for his first documentary 'Rat Art: Croatian Independents'. The video looked at artists making art in the context of a society at war.

His second feature was called 'What About Me: The Rise of The Nihilist Spasm Band'. The documentary premièred at the Toronto International Film Festival in 2000. Drawing from the inspiration of finding a copy of the Nihilist Spasm Band's first L.P. No Canada in the pile of 1970s ephemera in his family's basement, the documentary explores the legacy of the Canadian noise music pioneers.

The controversy surrounding an art student, Jesse Powers, and his infamous act of killing a cat as an art project formed the basis of his third feature documentary, Casuistry: The Art of Killing a Cat. The 2004 work, made in collaboration with experimental filmmaker Linda Feesey, explored the limits of what can constitute an artwork. The video also had its premiere at the Toronto International Film Festival in 2004. The first screening was almost shut down by street protesters alleging that the video condoned cruelty to animals.

His sound collaboration with Norway's Lasse Marhaug materialized as a CD release entitled 'The Romance is Over' by The Sleazy Listeners.

After receiving a diagnosis of CLL (chronic lymphocytic leukemia) in 2003 and going through an ordeal of chemotherapy in Montreal, Zev relocated to Shanghai to work on his documentary on the noise band Torturing Nurse. The work became Subcultural Revolution: Shanghai. Using the social context of the day-to-day lives of the band members; their collective underground project was revealed to be decidedly contrary to the prevailing notions of progress and success that the country was enjoying at the time.

After a relapse of CLL (chronic lymphocytic leukemia), Zev was obliged to return to Montreal for more treatment, eventually undergoing a stem cell transplant there at Hôpital Maisonneuve-Rosemont . For his final five years, Zev struggled with Graft-versus-host disease. His constant ordeal and medical treatments were the subject of his final and incomplete documentary video work 'Zev Asher:GVH.'

== Discography ==
=== As Nimrod ===
with Tim Olive and Sam Lohman

Year	Title	Label	Notes
1991	Cuntrroll	Bron Records	single-sided Flexi disc
1991	Grandson of Ham	Bron Records	CD
1992	Grandson of Ham	Scratch Records	CD reissue
1993	Getting Rained On	Scratch Records	7" split with Roughage & Masonna
1994	The Mighty Hunter	Scratch Records	CD / Picture LP
1996	Nimrod	Scratch Records	CD

=== As Roughage ===
Year	Title	Label	Notes
	Mystery Dick	self-released	cassette
1991	Same	Vanilla Records	VHS
1991	Shitsure I	Vanilla Records	single-sided cassette
1992	Travel the Globe	G.R.O.S.S.	cassette
1993	Fuckaraoke	Coquette	double 7" acetate split with Masonna
1993	Calendar Girl	Scratch Records	7" split Nimrod
1993		G.R.O.S.S.	cassette
1995	Benny's Audio Pt. 2 & 9 / Live at "Edison Electric Gallery"	Earwing Records	cassette
1995	¥en for Noise	Scratch Records	CD

Year	Track	Compilation	Label	Notes
1989	"Roughage in Paradise (Excerpt #1)", "Roughage in Paradise (Excerpt #2)"	Canada	Harsh Reality Music	cassette
1990	"Last Paradise"	Identification	See///.Saw Tapes	cassette
1991	"16 RPM"	Death of Vinyl	DOVe	CD
1994	"Hex Marks the Spot"	Optional Ingredients from a Vile Recipe	Trackshun Industries	7"
1995	"Pseudo-Rapist"	Kiling Ha Muerto...Cuantas Veces?	Climax Records	LP
1996	"Vacas"	Sidereal Rest "The Sleep Vehicle"	Scratch Records	CD
1996	"Aerobics Pt 1–3"	Tinker Compilation	Tinker Recordings	CD
2002	"Brumbrum au Tashkent"	Дичь Авангарда	Insofar Vapor Bulk	CD
2003	"United Nations"	No Tribute: Music of the Nihilist Spasm Band	Carbon / Sunship / Breathmint / Little Mafia	CD
2003	"Don't Stop Bleedin' (Glitch mix)"	Hurts So Good: The Cock E.S.P. Remix CD	V/Vm Test Records	CD
2006	untitled	Noisemass 2005	Topheth Prophet / T'an! Kaven!! Ash!!!	CDr

=== As Zev Asher ===
Year	Role	Track	Album	Artist	Label	Notes
1995	Featuring	"Urasia Circ (excerpt)"	Hafted Maul	Dead Voices on Air	Invisible Records	CD
1996	Production	"Hafted Maul"	Shap	Dead Voices on Air	Invisible Records	CD

=== As Bustmonster ===
with Masami Akita, Shohei Iwasaki, Fumio Kosakai, Masahiko Ohno, Tetsuo Sakaibara, Yamazaki Maso

Year	Title	Label	Notes
1992	Weedhead E.P.	Wild West Records	7"
1993	Whitehouse	RRRecords	7" split with Xper Xr

Year	Track	Compilation	Label	Notes
1992	"Live at Donzokohouse, Kyoto, 14. Dec, 1991"	Oh! Moro Volume 5	Maru ka Batsu (○か×)	VHS

=== As Flying Testicle ===
with Masami Akita and Yamazaki Maso

Year	Title	Label	Notes
1992	Lamerican Sextom	ZSF Produkt	7" acetate
1993	Space Desia	Charnel Music	CD

Year	Track	Compilation	Label	Notes
1993	"Testicle Rider"	Come Again II	Silent Records	CD

=== As The Sleazy Listeners ===
with Lasse Marhaug

Year	Title	Label	Notes
2004	"The Romance is Over"	Squirrelgirl Records	CD

=== As Starlet Fever ===
with Sanja Živković

Year	Title	Label	Notes
1996	Stars on 33	Earwing Records	7" split with Trailing Arm

== Filmography ==
Title	Year	Duration
RAT ART: Croatian Independents	1997	47 min.
What About Me: The Rise of the Nihilist Spasm Band	2000	76 min.
Casuistry: The Art of Killing a Cat	2004	78 min.
Mission Holiday	2006	25 min.
Aqua Alta	2007	70 min.
Subcultural Revolution: Shanghai	2008/10	71 min.
