= Aube (musician) =

Japanese noise musician (1959–2013)

- Born: Akifumi Nakajima; January 13, 1959; Kyoto, Japan
- Died: September 25, 2013 (aged 54) Kyoto
- Genres: Japanoise, noise, experimental, Ambient music, Electronic music
- Occupations: Musician, Industrial designer
- Instruments: Found objects See Discography
- Years active: 1991–2013
- Label: See Discography

Akifumi Nakajima (中嶋昭文, Nakajima Akifumi) (January 13, 1959 – September 25, 2013), better known by his stage name Aube, was a Japanese noise musician. He released many CDs, LPs and cassettes, and was regarded as one of the most important noise musicians of his time. He did not like to term his work "music," preferring the term "design": "I don't think of myself as a musician or an artist. I'm a designer. I therefore consider my sound works to be designs as well".

== Biography ==
Akifumi Nakajima was born in January 1959 in Kyoto. He worked as an Industrial designer and became thoroughly interested in sound work in the 1980s. In 1993, he was asked to create music for an art installation. After that, he created an enormous body of work.

== Music ==
The essential element of Nakajima recordings is that each record was composed with only a single material source, which was manipulated and processed using various types of electronic equipment. Examples of sources he manipulated include air, water, fluorescent lamps, voltage-controlled oscillators, voices, pulmonary sounds, the Holy Bible's pages, and steel wire. In November 1996, he performed at the Takamatsu City Museum Of Art using only telephones as source material. His 1993 album Luminous was written for an art installation by Takashi Sasaoka and Sasaoka Takashi, which used flickering fluorescent lights; the sound source for the album is fluorescent & glow lamps. He also used the sounds of the human body--the lungs, heart and blood vessels, saying "The sounds in the body, like brainwaves, the lungs, heartbeat, blood vessels, these are usually not heard very well. But I have a mysterious image of the body, and what kinds of sound are within. My albums using these body sound sources are my way of expressing my image of the body".

Many of his earliest recordings use water as a source, in either a still form or a gush, as from a faucet or a stream. Among the most well-known are Hydrophobia (1991, Vanilla, Japan), Métal De Métal (1996, Manifold, USA), Cardiac Strain (1997, Alien8 Recordings, Canada), and Set On (2001, Manifold, USA). His early work was noisier; his later work leaned toward ambient. Some of his albums are thirty minutes long; some consist of one 60-minute piece.

Nakajima had his own record label, G.R.O.S.S. Records, through which he released his music, and that of several other musicians. G.R.O.S.S. then partnered with many different labels to release Aube's music in Asia, North America and Europe.

He often provided work to order--a label would ask for an album based on a specific sound and he'd create it. One example of this is from 1998, when the American label Elsie and Jack Recordings asked him to create ''Pages From The Book, and the requested source was the sound of the pages of the Bible being rubbed together (the first copies of the release included fragments of the pages used in the recording). "If it is an interesting sound source, I will accept it," said Nakajima. "I'm always interested in both the sound itself and the image from the source. I was worried about the use of the Bible, and I'm not anti-Christian. The label told me there would be no problems, so I did it. My sounds are a peaceful and delicate representation of it."

Nakajima released his music on cassette, with exquisitely designed, often hand-made J-cards. Many of the cassette designs were elaborate, e.g. each case of his 1994 album E-Power contained a fragment of an x-ray. His 1995 album Squash was packaged in a squashed can held together by nuts and bolts; 1997's Aqua Syndrome was packaged with a bag of blue water. All tapes were numbered with unique stickers and were produced in very limited numbers, with the quantities often being as significant as the meaning of the music. The G.R.O.S.S. Envelope series, packaged in a sealed black envelope, was limited to 120 numbered copies. In the case of the G.R.O.S.S. series, the first 50 copies of each were on metal tape, the remainder on chrome tape. Many of Aube's recordings have been recently re-released, however most of his music is unavailable via streaming platforms.

== Death ==
Nakajima died on 25 September 2013, of a pneumothorax, at age 54.

== Collaborations ==
Several compilation CDs are of note in Aube's history. Most notable, perhaps, is the Come Again compilation, released in 1991 on Vanilla Records, which contains one of the first tracks recorded under the Aube moniker. Later notable compilations include Come Again II (1993), The Japanese/American Noise Treaty (1995), and Ant-Hology (1998).

Nakajima also collaborated with many Japanoise artists. They are: Club Skull with Hiroshi Hasegawa of C.C.C.C. & Fumio Kosakai of Incapacitants, SIAN with Shohei Iwasaki of Monde Bruits, Kinkakuji with Maso Yamazaki (Masonna), Ginkakuji with Hiroshi Hasegawa, Gokurakuji' with Maso Yamazaki and Hiroshi Hasegawa, Loop Circuit with Dub Murashita of Dubwise, Hyper Ventilation with Dub Murashita, Meiji Jingu with Kohei Gomi of Pain Jerk, Ise Jingu with Masahiko Ohno of Solmania, Heian Jingu with Toshiji Mikawa of Incapacitants, and Atsuta Jingu with Kohei Gomi, Masahiko Ohno and & Toshiji Mikawa. In 2005 he cooperated with the Italian experimental artist Maurizio Bianchi for two projects titled "Junkyo" (Noctovision) and "Mectpyo Saisei" (Para Disc). In his memory, his friend Eric Lanzillotta shared a live recording of a collaboration between him and Akifumi on Soundcloud, which was recorded in 2004.

== Discography ==
Albums

- Hydrophobia (water) (1991), Vanilla Records, Japan
- Spindrift (water) (1992), G.R.O.S.S. (Re-issued 2016 and 2020)
- Flash-Point (glow lamps) (1993), G.R.O.S.S. (Re-issued 2017)
- Flood-Gate (water) (1993), G.R.O.S.S. 500 copies, Vanilla Records, Japan (Re-issued 2019)
- Submerged Tension Remix (water) (1993), G.R.O.S.S. (Re-issued 2017)
- Luminous (fluorescent & glow lamps) (1993), G.R.O.S.S. (Re-issued 2017)
- E-Power (voltage-controlled oscillator) (1994), G.R.O.S.S. (Re-issued 2017)
- Purification to Numbness (voltage-controlled oscillator) (1994) G.R.O.S.S. 100 copies, Pure Records USA 900 copies.
- Frequency for Collapse (sounds of Daiku Building, Okayama) (1994), G.R.O.S.S. (Re-issued 2017)
- Emotional Oscillation (voltage-controlled oscillator) (1994), Old Europa Cafe, Italy
- G-Radiation (glow lamps) (1994), G.R.O.S.S. 500 copies, Fever Pitch Records UK
- Wired Trap (steel wire) (1995), G.R.O.S.S. 100 copies, Self Abuse Records USA 900 copies.
- Entangle Spirant (steel wire) (1995), Drahtfunk-Products
- Metalustration (voltage-controlled oscillator) (1995), G.R.O.S.S. 50 copies, Bloodlust! Records USA
- Squash (tin can) (1995), G.R.O.S.S. 100 copies, Chocolate Monk UK
- Pulse Resonator (voltage-controlled oscillator) (1995), G.R.O.S.S. 275 copies, Praxis Dr. Bearmann, Germany
- Can-Zone (tin can) (1995), G.R.O.S.S. 50 copies, Soja-Sauce Bolognese, Switzerland
- Magnetostriction (magnetic resonance spectroscopy) (1995), G.R.O.S.S. 777 copies, God Factory, Netherlands
- Métal De Métal (metal pieces) (1996), G.R.O.S.S. 1000 copies, Manifold Records USA (Re-issued 2008)
- Grind Carve (voltage-controlled oscillator) (1996), Slaughter Productions, Italy (Re-issued 2021)
- Spiral Tricle Distillation (water) (1996), Rund Um Den Watzmann, Netherlands, 500 copies
- Floating Memory (voltage-controlled oscillator) (1996), G.R.O.S.S. 100 copies, Napalmed Records, Czech Republic
- Bugs In The Circuits (digital signals) (1996), G.R.O.S.S. 500 copies, Heel Stone Records, Germany
- Maschinenwerk (original sound by Cock E.S.P.) (1996), G.R.O.S.S. 1000 copies, Charnel Music, USA
- Infinitely Orbit (Roland SH-2 Synthesizer) (1996), G.R.O.S.S. 500 copies, Alchemy Records, Japan
- Somnambulism (Roland SH-2 Synthesizer) (1996), G.R.O.S.S. 111 copies, Kadef, Germany
- Feed the Fishes (water) (1996), G.R.O.S.S. 150 copies, Betley Welcomes Careful Drivers, UK
- Moment in Fragrance (Roland SH-2 Synthesizer) (1996), G.R.O.S.S. 150 copies, Cling-Film Records, Belgium
- Stared Gleam (glow lamp) (1997), G.R.O.S.S. 1000 copies, Iris Light Records, UK (Re-issued 2014)
- Aqua Syndrome (water) (1997), G.R.O.S.S. 1000 copies, Manifold Records, USA (Re-issued 2008)
- Cardiac Strain (human heartbeat) (1997), G.R.O.S.S. 666 copies, Alien8 Recordings, Canada (Re-issued 2008)
- Dazzle Reflexion (fluorescent and glow lamps) (1997), G.R.O.S.S. 500 copies, Releasing Eskimo, Sweden
- Split (telephones) (1997, split with Knurl), G.R.O.S.S. 500 copies, Alien8 Recordings, Canada
- New Forms of Free Entertainment (sounds by Lasse Marhaug) (1997), G.R.O.S.S. 500 copies, Jazzassin Records, Norway
- Video Field Recordings with Sshe Retina Stimulants (environmental sounds Milan) (1997), G.R.O.S.S. 300 copies, Duebel, Germany
- Sigh in Depressive Blue (human lungs) (1997), G.R.O.S.S. 300 copies, Praxis Dr. Bearmann, Germany
- Throb in Manic Red (human heartbeat) (1997), G.R.O.S.S. 200 copies, Praxis Dr. Bearmann, Germany
- Vas In Euthymic Violet (human blood vessels) (1997), G.R.O.S.S. 500 copies, Praxis Dr. Bearmann, Germany
- Deglaze (glass) (1998), G.R.O.S.S. 470 copies, Old Europa Cafe, Italy (Re-issued 2002)
- Cerebral Disturbance (brain waves/Electroencephalography) (1998), G.R.O.S.S. 625 copies, Anomalous Records, USA
- Pages From The Book (Bible pages) (1998), G.R.O.S.S. 100 copies, Elsie and Jack Recordings, USA, 1000 copies
- Embers (fire) (1998), G.R.O.S.S. 580 copies, Anti-Zen Records, Germany
- 3 Cadavres Exquis (1998, split with M.S.B.R. and Koji Marutani), E(r)ostrate, France
- Evocation (brain waves/Electroencephalography) (1998), G.R.O.S.S. 621 copies, Auf Abwegen, Germany
- Splinter Clear Cut (glass) / Joyous Smash (1998, split with The Haters), G.R.O.S.S. 500 copies, Freak Animal Records, Finland
- Mort Aux Vaches: Still Contemplation (metal pieces) (1998), G.R.O.S.S. 500 copies, Staalplaat, Netherlands
- Shade-Away (glass) (1999), G.R.O.S.S. 500 copies, re-issued 340 copies 2004, Art-ic Culture, Sweden
- Mutation with Zbigniew Karkowski (squeaking floor of Chion-in temple) (1999), G.R.O.S.S. 500 copies, ERS Records, Netherlands
- R-S+C (1999, split with Telepherique), G.R.O.S.S. 300 copies, Duebel, Germany
- 108 (bell) (1999), G.R.O.S.S. 801 copies, Old Europa Cafe, Italy
- Ricochetentrance (water) (1999), G.R.O.S.S. 1000 copies, Lunar Records, UK
- Suppression Disorder (voltage-controlled oscillator) (1996), G.R.O.S.S. 500 copies, Alchemy Records, Japan
- Sensorial Inducement (Roland SH-2 Synthesizer) (2000), G.R.O.S.S. 509 copies, Alien8 Recordings, Canada
- Sonority Area (glass) (2000, Orbital Confluence split with Nagisa ni te and Naoki Zushi), Neurec Records, Japan
- Solid Pressure (metal pieces) (2000), G.R.O.S.S. 500 copies, Blackbean & Placenta Tape Club, USA
- Set On (stone) (2000), G.R.O.S.S. 1000 copies, Manifold Records, USA
- Triad Thread (metal pieces) (2000), G.R.O.S.S. 600 copies, Armonika, Italy
- Millennium - Iunius (fire) (2000), Armonika, Italy, 500 copies
- Millennium - Martius (water) (2000), Armonika, Italy, 500 copies
- Millennium - Februarius (water) (2000), Armonika, Italy, 500 copies
- Millennium - Aprilis (fire) (2000), Armonika, Italy, 500 copies
- Millennium - Maius (fire) (2000), Armonika, Italy, 500 copies
- Millennium - Ianuarius (water) (2000), Armonika, Italy, 500 copies
- Blood-Brain Barrier (brain waves/Electroencephalography) (2000), G.R.O.S.S. 500 copies, Ytterbium, France
- MDML98 (metal pieces) (2001), G.R.O.S.S. 150 copies
- Timemind (Firstman SQ-01 Synthesizer) (2001), G.R.O.S.S. 500 copies, Alchemy Records, Japan
- Millennium - Iulius (earth) (2001), Armonika, Italy, 500 copies
- Millennium - Augustus (earth) (2001), Armonika, Italy, 500 copies
- Millennium - September (earth) (2001), Armonika, Italy, 500 copies
- Live In Montreal 2000 (2001), G.R.O.S.S. 100 copies
- Benefit 2002 - 199501170546 (clock) (2002), G.R.O.S.S. 150 copies (Re-released 2018)
- Millennium-R2 (water, fire, earth, air) (2002), G.R.O.S.S. 120 copies (Re-released 2002)
- Bar 2.1-A 2000-2001 (Firstman SQ-01 Synthesizer) (2002), G.R.O.S.S. 100 copies
- Millennium (water, fire, earth, air) (2002), Armonika, Italy, 120 copies
- RM4 (rusty metal) (2002), Ultra-Mail Prod., Hong Kong, 1000 copies
- Howling Obsession (small speaker) (2002), G.R.O.S.S. 150 copies, Manifold Records, USA
- Data-X (5.25" floppy disk) (2002), G.R.O.S.S. 150 copies
- Millennium – October (air) (2002), Armonika, Italy 500 copies
- Timemind Live 2002 (Firstman SQ-01 synthesizer) (2002), G.R.O.S.S. 150 copies
- Redintegration (Amdek PCK-100 percussion synthesizer) (2002), G.R.O.S.S. 202 copies
- Millennium – November (air) (2002), Armonika, Italy 500 copies
- Millennium – December (air) (2002), Armonika, Italy 500 copies
- Ukiyo & Wired Trap Live 1994 + 1995 (sounds of Kyoto, steel wire) (2002), G.R.O.S.S. 150 copies
- Live In Montreal 2001 (2002), G.R.O.S.S. 150 copies
- SDL97 (Suppression Disorder live Rostock & Kyoto), (2002) G.R.O.S.S. 111 copies
- SDL97 (Suppression Disorder live Berlin & Kyoto), (2002) G.R.O.S.S. 111 copies
- SDL98 (Suppression Disorder live) (2002), G.R.O.S.S. 111 copies
- Live In Michigan 2001 (2002), G.R.O.S.S. 150 copies
- Spatio-Temporal Cluster (Roland SH-2 Synthesizer) (2002), G.R.O.S.S. 101
- Live Feedbacks 2003 (2003), G.R.O.S.S. 101 copies (Re-released 2018)
- Wired Trap Live 1994 + 1995 (2003), G.R.O.S.S. 150 copies
- Live Red 2002 (2003), G.R.O.S.S. 101 copies
- Duplex-Sphere (voltage-controlled oscillator) (2004), G.R.O.S.s., 445 copies, Ultra-Mail Prod., Hong Kong
- Junkyo with Maurizio Bianchi (piano) (2005), Noctovision, Japan 1000 copies
- Mectpyo Saisei with Maurizio Bianchi (piano) (2005), PARA Disc, Japan 500 copies
- Chain [Re] Action (chain) (2005), Blossoming Noise, USA 1000 copies
- Reworks Maurizio Bianchi Vol. 1 (piano) (2005), Silentes Minimal Editions, Italy
- Reworks Stefano Gentile (original sounds) (2005), Silentes Minimal Editions, Italy
- Metalive 1997 + 1997 (2005), Neurec, Japan 1000 copies
- Paris 00 / Tokyo 99 (2006), G.R.O.S.S. 130 copies, Stroomstoot, Netherlands
- Reworks Maurizio Bianchi Vol. 2 (piano) (2006), Silentes Minimal Editions, Italy
- Comet (ice and space) (2006), Troniks, USA, Cipher Productions, Australia 500 copies
- Signal To Noise Vol. 5 with Jason Kahn, Norbert Möslang & Günter Müller (2007), For 4 Ears Records, Switzerland
- Ambera Planeta Wawar (2007), Autarkeia, Lithuania
- Reworks Nimh Vol. 1 (2007), Silentes Minimal Editions, Italy
- Imagery Resonance (Amdek PCK-100 percussion synthesizer) (2007), G.R.O.S.S. 1000 copies Aquarellist, Russia
- Variable Ambit (feedback) (2011), Housepig, USA 300 copies
- Fling (2016), Iris Light Records, UK
- Live 1988 (2016), Iris Light Records, UK
- Hydrophobia 1993 (water) (2021), Cheeses International, UK 300 copies
