= Cock E.S.P. =

American band

- Origin: Minneapolis, Minnesota
- Genres: Experimental; electronic; rock; noise rock; shock rock; noise
- Years active: 1993–present
- Members: Emil Hagstrom, Matt Bacon, Paige Flash
- Website: cockesp.com

Cock E.S.P. is a band based in Minneapolis, Minnesota. The group draws on extreme, subversive and absurdist elements of popular and experimental twentieth century music and performance art.

== History ==
Although the group has dabbled in various musical styles and techniques over the years, the most recent has involved the showcasing and amplifying of mistakes and equipment failures. E.S.P. began to feel that such unintended sounds actually had a greater capacity for chaos and intensity than those sounds they actually wished to create. Thus, recent studio recordings were edited to isolate and emphasize these sounds, creating an intricate web of pure noise.

The group's live performance has changed over the years, starting out as a standard recital of the recorded music, and eventually ending up as a drunken absurdist theatrical production utilizing homemade costumes, props and elaborate stage lighting set-ups; combining the elements of MTV’s "Jackass" with a literally crippling level of ineptitude. On a recent 2011 tour the group introduced an all wireless setup which allow not only greater freedom-of-movement but created another level of uncertainty with all manor of radio stations, shortwave, CB and other unintended electronic interference to play a role, including bizarre interactions between E.S.P. performers' signals.

Cock E.S.P. is often noted for injecting comedic and absurdist elements into their; the result of an ever-increasing level of hard work and professionalism. Despite releasing dozens of lo-fidelity demo cassettes in their early days that tend to consist of long, utterly lazy-sounding static tracks of heavily distorted low- to mid-range noise that sound like no one was paying any attention to any aspect of them, the group now embraces production values.

The roots of ESP date back to 1984, when founding member P.C. Hammeroids organized a metal-percussion noise ensemble called Grandpa Eats Goat Cheese. Over the next nine years, Hammeroids recorded and performed under several names, adding more and more electronic noise to the mix. In 1993 Hammeroids joined forces with Emil Hagstrom (of Wrong), beginning the project which would soon become known as Cock E.S.P. The name of the group appears to have been derived from one of the track titles of an album by the Japanese noise band Hanatarash.

Hammeroids retired in 1996 and was replaced later that year by Matt Bacon. Elyse Perez (Laundry Room Squelchers) became the permanent third member in 2001. Guest members over the years have included Weasel Walter (Flying Luttenbachers, XBXRX), Rat Bastard (Laundryroom Squelchers, Scraping Teeth), Misty Martinez, La Persona (BunnyBrains, U Can Unlearn Guitar), Paige Flash, John Vance (Wrong, Rexor), and Kazko Peasmith (Insect Deli, Winter Carousel).

Cock E.S.P. has given more than 150 performances throughout the US and Europe in various rock and jazz clubs, punk houses, theatres, festival stages, art galleries, record stores and warehouse performance spaces. The group has collaborated with such artists as Thurston Moore, Merzbow, The Eugenics Council, and Aube; has played shows with such artists as Sonic Youth, Wolf Eyes, Hair Police, Borbetomagus, Stereolab, Impaler, Melt-Banana, Caroliner Rainbow, BunnyBrains, Illusion of Safety, Sudden Infant, V/Vm and the Nihilist Spasm Band; and has appeared on compilation releases with such artists as Andrew W.K., Derek Bailey, the Haters, Bruce Gilbert, Today is the Day, Reynols, Harvey Sid Fisher, Bomb20, Jansky Noise, Quintron, The Locust, His Name Is Alive, Jad Fair, John Oswald, Masonna, Hijo Kaidan, Lasse Marhaug and Free Kitten.

The group celebrated their 10th anniversary in autumn 2003 by releasing their second greatest hits collection, a remix CD, their first DVD, and by doing a three-week US tour. In early 2004 they released their third collection of greatest hits, and did a short tour featuring the "classic" Bacon/Hagstrom duo line-up.

In addition to Cock E.S.P., members have played in a variety of intriguing side-projects. Matt Bacon has been a drummer, bassist and vocalist with a number of punk, metal and industrial bands including Zenith Flytrap, the Derks, Sauce Party and Broke Box (which was once described by Peter Sotos of Whitehouse as being "Great!") Emil Hagstrom is also a member of the free-improv ensemble WRONG, and the dark electro-acoustic project Origami Genitalia. Elyse Perez performs no wave and punk with such bands as the Real Band and Fancy & Stink.

In 2004, Cock E.S.P. released an album jointly with Panicsville, Last Train to Cocksville, a 'tribute' to The Monkees.

== Members ==
- Emil Hagstrom
- Elyse Perez
- Matt Bacon
- Paige Flash
- John Vance
- Jason Wade
- NoNo Vetsch
- Jaime Carrera (deceased)
- Nicole Rode
- Greg Anderson
- Mike Etoll
- Tim Carrol
- Caro Kora
- Caitlin Karolczak

== Discography ==
=== Albums ===
- We mean It This Time (1999) Blackbean & Placenta
- Excessive Size Punisher (2000) Fever Pitch
- Hurts So Good: The Painful Remixes (2003) Offal
- Cockworld Little Mafia
- Last Train to Cocksville Little Mafia (with Panicsville)

=== Singles ===
- Music for Man With No Name (1994)

=== Compilation appearances ===
- "I Lied About Your Band So I Could Drink Beer For Free" on Brainwaves (2006)
- OvO/Cock ESP split 7” on Little Mafia (2006)

== Audio ==
Samples of Cock E.S.P.'s musical output can be found here.

== Related web sites ==
- Cock ESP Official site
- Emil's site
- Video documentary of a 2019 show in Fargo ND
- Cock E.S.P. Live August 23, 2019. Columbus, Ohio.
