= Actual Fucking =

Studio album by Cex
- Released: September 19, 2006
- Genre: Electronic
- Length: 40:27
- Label: Automation Records
- Producer: Ryjan Kidwell & Jason Caddell

Cex chronology
Maryland Mansions (2003)	Actual Fucking (2006)	Sketchi (2007)

Professional ratings
Review scores
Source	Rating
Allmusic	4/5 stars
Pitchfork	7.4/10
PopMatters	5/10 stars
Stylus Magazine	C+
Vice	0/10

Actual Fucking is an album by Cex released in 2006. Each track is named after and written about a city (Baltimore, Los Angeles, Denton, etc.). The album is heavy on vocals and was released by Seattle label Automation Records.

Both the CD and LP versions come with a booklet of eight anonymous, explicit sex stories written by friends of Cex.

== Track listing ==
- Lyrics By Ryjan Kidwell. Music By Cex.
1. "Baltimore" 4:52
2. "Denton" 5:52
3. "Chapel Hill" 4:22
4. "Ybor City" 3:34
5. "Covington" 6:15
6. "Chicago" 4:08
7. "Los Angeles" 6:39
8. "Tucumcari" 4:44

== Personnel ==
=== Cex ===
- Ryjan Kidwell: Vocals
- Jason Buehler: Guitars
- Cale Parks: Keyboards & Additional Drums
- Roby Newton: Bass, Vocal Backing
- Mark Shirazi: Drums

=== Additional Personnel ===
- Jason Caddell: Additional Vocal Backing
- Tim Kinsella: Hook

== Production ==
- Produced & Mixed By Ryjan Kidwell & Jason Caddell
- Engineered By Ryjan Kidwell, Bobby Burg & Jason Caddell
- Mastered By Shanw "Twerk" Hatfield
- All Songs Published By Pain-Based Lifeform (ASCAP), We Go Towards (ASCAP), Stay And Fight (SESAC) & Songs That Keep Me Here (SESAC).

=== Production Notes ===
- According to the CD liner notes, "Producers' names contain consecutive Ls (Kidwell & Caddell). Recordists' names contain at least three of the same letter (not true, as the only engineer whose name has three letters is Bobby Burg). Singers always have a W in their names (vocalist Kidwell & bassist Newton). The difference between the number of consonants and vowels in the names of Instrument Players is never four or five. Producers are also Recordists as well as Backup Singers. Singers made the Artwork. The person whose name contains the greater number of consonants wrote the lyrics (meaning Kidwell; his name contains nine consonants).
