= P16.D4 =

German band (1980–1988)

- P16.D4 cassette cover (1981)

Background information
- Origin: Frankfurt, Germany
- Genres: Electronic music; noise; musique concrète; industrial
- Years active: 1980–1988
- Labels: Selektion; RRRecords; Odd Size (re-releases); Sonoris (re-releases); Was Soll Das ? Schallplatten (re-releases)
- Spinoffs: Permutative Distortion; S.B.O.T.H.I.; SLP; RLW
- Spinoff of: P.D.; Skartrack
- Members: Ralf Wehowsky; Ewald Weber; Roger Schönauer; Stefan E. Schmidt
- Past members: Achim Szepanski; Gerd Poppe

P16.D4 was a German (Frankfurt-based) electronic noise music collective, active primarily from 1980 to 1988. P16.D4's core techniques centered on analog manipulation of sound, prioritizing physical intervention to generate abrasive, non-linear sound art compositions. As such, they embraced tape cut-up technique, musique concrète, the recycling and transformation of previously published material, and many long-distance collaborations with like-minded artists such as DDAA, Vortex Campaign, Nurse With Wound, and Merzbow. They were associated with SLP, a project composed of four different Frankfurt-based groups, and Selektion, a collective project involved with publishing books and sound and visual art.

Their active participation in the international industrial music tape scene yielded collaborative output such as their release Distruct, where bands such as Nurse with Wound, Nocturnal Emissions, Die Tödliche Doris, and The Haters provided the source material. The longest-term collaboration was with the installation and conceptual artist Achim Wollscheid, who used P16.D4 sounds as the basis for LPs he recorded under the name SBOTHI. Ralf Wehowsky later released solo material under the alias RLW.

== Discography ==
=== Albums ===
- Wer Nicht Arbeiten Will Soll Auch Nicht Essen! - 1981
- V.R.N.L. - 1981
- Kühe In 1/2 Trauer (Selektion) - 1982-1983
- Distruct (Selektion) - 1982-1984
- Nichts Niemand Nirgends Nie! (Selektion) - 1985
- Tionchor (Selektion) - 1982-1986
- Acrid Acme (Of) P16.D4 (Selektion) - 1986-1988
- Bruitiste (RRRecords) - 1988
- Fifty (RRRecords) - 1990

=== Compilations ===
- Three Projects (Bruitiste - Captured Music - Fifty) (RRRecords) - 1993
