= Sketchi =

Studio album by Cex
- Released: April 24, 2007
- Genre: Electronic
- Length: 60:53
- Label: Temporary Residence TRR116
- Producer: Rjyan Kidwell

Cex chronology
Actual Fucking (2006)	Sketchi (2007)	Tiny Creature (2011)

Professional ratings
Review scores
Source	Rating
AllMusic	4/5 stars
Pitchfork	7.0/10

Sketchi is an album by Cex released in 2007. The album's cover is a modified version of the movie poster for the 1988 Arnold Schwarzenegger and Danny DeVito comedy Twins.

== Track listing ==
No.	Title	Length
1.	"Damon Kvols"	10:25
2.	"Rattler Bin"	5:41
3.	"Waiting 4 Yankovic"	6:08
4.	"Camber Sands"	6:10
5.	"Gooby Says"	6:42
6.	"Oregon Ridge"	7:03
7.	"Suffocating Champion"	6:40
8.	"God Blessing"	6:00
9.	"Pilsenmx" (feat. Nice Nice)	6:04
