= Incapacitants =

Japanese noise music group

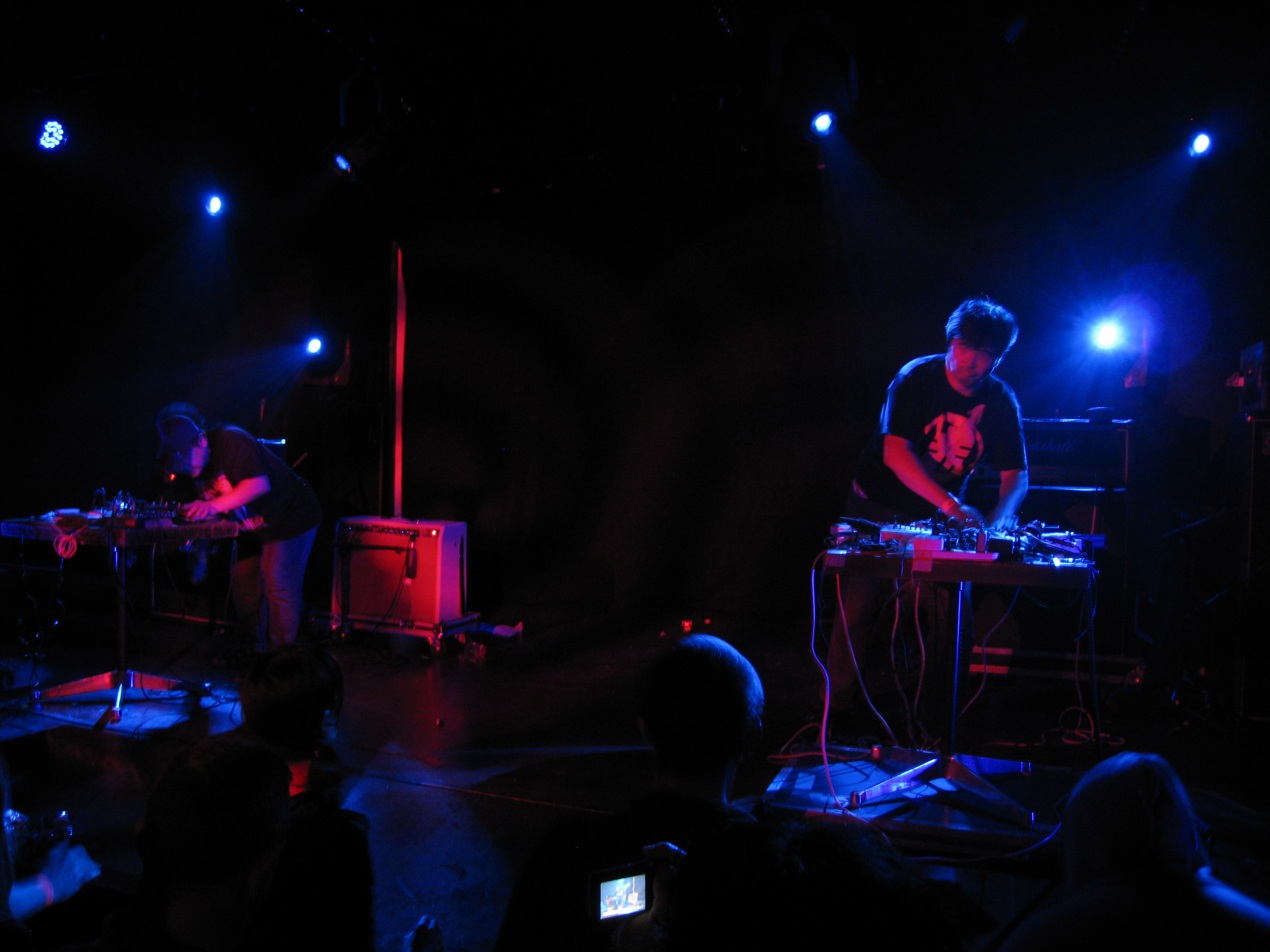
- Incapacitants performing live at LUFF in 2010

Background information
- Also known as: インキャパシタンツ
- Origin: Osaka, Japan
- Genres: Japanoise
- Years active: 1981–present
- Label: Alchemy
- Members: Toshiji Mikawa; Fumio Kosakai
- Website: www.japanimprov.com/incapa/

Incapacitants (インキャパシタンツ, Inkyapashitantsu) are a Japanese noise music group formed in 1981. Initially a solo project of Toshiji Mikawa, Fumio Kosakai joined upon the project's relocation to Tokyo. The duo's stated aim is to produce "pure" noise, uninfluenced by musical ideas or even human intention, using primarily feedback, vocals, and various electronics. Kosakai calls this sound "hard noise", as a nod to the jazz subgenre hard bop.

== History ==
In 1981, Toshiji Mikawa formed Incapacitants in Osaka as a solo project from his other creative endeavours with improv noise group Hijokaidan. As a solo project, Mikawa collaborated with Japanese vocalist and visual artist Yamantaka Eye, among others. After relocating to Tokyo, Kosakai, of Japanese noise band C.C.C.C., joined Incapacitants to form the current duo. Kosakai would later join Mikawa and become a regular member of Hijokaidan.

Incapacitants, alongside Hijokaidan, Merzbow, C.C.C.C., Solmania, Hanatarash, the Gerogerigegege, and Masonna, are counted among the more well-known Japanese noise bands formed in the 1980s.

In November 1999, Incapacitants performed their first international concert at Music Unlimited Festival '99 in Wels, Austria.

Many of the group's track titles reference their professions, but because of Mikawa and Kosakai's day jobs as bank employee and government office worker, respectively, the duo have not been able to tour abroad often.

The group also recorded sessions with Vivian Slaughter of Gallhammer.

== Discography ==
- Eternal Paralysis (1981)
- Peony Crackers (1983)
- Project Pallo '85 (1985)
- Repo (1989)
- Feedback of N.M.S. (1990)
- Fabrication (1991)
- Quietus (1993)
- Extreme Gospel Nights (1993)
- Stupid Is Stupid (1993)
- No Progress (1994)
- Ad Nauseam (1994)
- As Loud As Possible (1995)
- D.D.D.D. (Destroy Devastating and Disgusting Derivatives) (1995)
- El Shanbara Therminosis (1995)
- Operorue (1995)
- Ministry of Foolishness (1995)
- The Tongue (1996)
- Asset Without Liability (1996)
- Cosmic Incapacitants (1996)
- New Movements in CMPD (1996)
- I, Residuum (1997)
- Default Standard (1999)
- Unauthorized Fatal Operation 990130 (1999)
- Live Incapacitants (2000)
- Sec End (2004)
- 73 (2007)
- The Crowd Inched Closer & Closer (2007)
- Burning Orange (2008)
- Lon Guy (2009)
- Tight (2009)
- Mon, Ma? Mon!!! (2012)
- Zashikiwarashi Effect (2012)
- Eat! Meat!! Manifesto!!! (2012)
- Survival of the Laziest (2017)
- Breath of Insect (2017)
- Zouvneree (2018)
- As Anti as Possible (2019)
- Ostracized Enigmatic Conqueror (2019)
- Onomatopée Suicida (2020)
- Incapacitants (2020)
- Oxen Man's Uneasiness (2023)
- Achilles Tendon Rupture (2025)
- Chwalfa (2025)
- Telecom Confusion (2026)
