= Mr. Messiah =

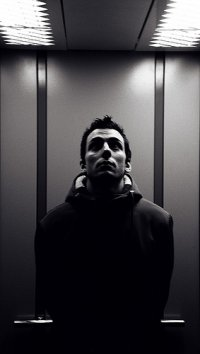

Background information
- Born: October 27, 1988 (age 37)
- Origin: St. Petersburg, Russia
- Genres: Electronic, dubstep, breakcore
- Occupation: Musician
- Instrument: Computer
- Years active: 2008–present
- Labels: Automation Records, Audio Science Recordings

Yuri Kostrov (born October 27, 1988 in Russia), better known as Mr. Messiah, is an electronic musician and DJ. He is in the St. Petersburg dubstep and breakcore scenes and is affiliated with Russia's glitch, IDM, and hardcore techno music scenes.

In 2008, he released his debut record entitled The Dublab on Seattle's Automation Records. The record was featured in such publications as Dusted Magazine, Experimusic, Textura, Cylic Defrost, and DJ Mag. Tracks from the record were also featured on the mix CD Frequency Labyrinths by Neut and DJ Marcelle Van Hoof's Another Nice Mess.
