= Maryland Mansions =

Studio album by Cex
- Released: November 18, 2003 (U.S.)
- Recorded: October 2002 – March 2003
- Genre: Darkwave, electronica, underground rap
- Length: 25:12
- Label: Jade Tree Records JT1090

Cex chronology
Being Ridden and BR Instrumentals (2003)	Maryland Mansions (2003)	Actual Fucking (2006)

Professional ratings
Review scores
Source	Rating
AllMusic	4/5 stars

Maryland Mansions is an album by Cex released on Jade Tree Records in 2003. The album is darker and more aggressive than previous works, with strong industrial influences. Cex has acknowledged being heavily influenced by the early Nine Inch Nails album Broken, a work known for its intensity over its similarly short length. Both works have the same number of tracks as well.

The album's name is also strongly similar to that of the artist Marilyn Manson, a former protégé of Nine Inch Nails frontman Trent Reznor.

== Track listing ==
1. "Drive Off a Mountain" – 3:14
2. "Stop Eating" – 3:09
3. "Take Pills" – 2:59
4. "Kill Me" – 3:34
5. "My Head" – 2:57
6. "New Maps" – 2:52
7. "Stillnaut Riyan" – 3:12
8. "The Strong Suit" – 3:15
