= Monde Bruits =

- Birth name: Shohei Iwasaki
- Born: 1962
- Died: April 14, 2005 (aged 42–43)
- Genres: Noise
- Occupation: Musician
- Instrument(s): Electronics, effects, synthesizer
- Labels: Vanilla Records, G.R.O.S.S.
- Formerly of: ABM, Bustmonster, MXM, Sian

Shohei Iwasaki (岩崎昇平, Iwasaki Shōhei) (1962 – April 14, 2005), better known by his stage name Monde Bruits (モンド・ブリューイッツ, French for "noise world"), was a Japanese noise musician. He was one of the earliest in Japan's noise scene, and it was Iwasaki who organized Masami Akita's first Merzbow show in Osaka, Japan. He was also involved in ABM (with Fusao Toda and Naoto Hayashi), MXM (with Macronympha), and Sian (with Aube).

Iwasaki died in a motorcycle accident in 2005.

== Discography ==
- Portuguese Man-of-War (1991)
- Irresponsibility (1991)
- Purgatory (1992)
- Psychosomatic Performance (1993)
- Selected Noise Works 93-94 (1994)
- Fragmentagraph (1996) (split with Pain Jerk)
- Monde Bruits (1999)
