= Automation Records =

Seattle based independent record label

- Founded: 2003
- Genre: Electronic, experimental, IDM, glitch/glitch hop, hip hop
- Country of origin: U.S.
- Location: Seattle, Washington
- Official website: www.automationrecords.com

Automation Records is a Seattle based independent record label. The label's first release was in 2003 and as of 2013 the label has over fifty releases.

Automation Records roster of artists include Abiku, Cex, Curse, DJ Strapon, Forest Kingdom, Gonken, Hopen, Kid Camaro, Mochipet, Mr. Messiah, nonnon, Producer Snafu, Red Squirrels, Graz, and Uglyhead.

== History ==
From 2003 to 2005 Automation Records existed in relative obscurity releasing only a handful of CDs by local artists and only receiving write-ups in local papers.

In 2006 they released the album “Actual Fucking” by the artist Cex. This album received widespread print coverage and charted on the CMJ RPM charts for 6 weeks, peaking at #11. In addition to the Cex album they also released the albums “Location” by Abiku, and “From Time To Time” by Uglyhead which received additional reviews nationwide.

2007 saw the label releasing companion EPs to their 2006 albums. Cex released a remix EP titled “Exotical Privates” which contained four remixes from his album “Actual Fucking”, Uglyhead released two EPs for their tour titled “Inward” and “Outward”, Abiku released a 7” record and the label expanded their roster with another 7” from the artist Red Squirrels titled “Acicorn Twirl”. Both 7” were reviewed in the Wire (magazine). The Cex EP received heavy rotation on KEXP was one of KEXP DJ Larry Metro’s “Top 10 of 2007”.
