= Maso Yamazaki =

Japanese noise musician

Masonna
- Also known as: Masonna, Space Machine, Controlled Death, Ja a ku yamiizu lu
- Born: Takushi Yamazaki; November 16, 1966 (age 59); Miyazu, Kyoto, Japan
- Origin: Osaka
- Genres: Noise, psychedelic rock, dark ambient
- Occupation: Musician
- Instruments: Shaker box; effects; electronics; analog synthesizer
- Years active: 1987–present
- Labels: Alchemy, Coquette
- Member of: Masonna (マゾンナ)

Maso Yamazaki (山崎マゾ, Yamazaki Maso), better known by his stage name Masonna, is a Japanese noise musician. He was born Takushi Yamazaki (山崎卓志, Yamazaki Takushi) on November 16, 1966, in Miyazu, Kyoto, Japan.

Masonna (マゾンナ) was started in 1987 in Osaka as Maso Yamazaki's noise project. The name is a combination of the Japanese words Maso (マゾ, Masochist) and Onna (女, Woman). It is also a pun on the name of the pop singer Madonna. The name is sometimes rendered as a backronym for Mademoiselle Anne Sanglante Ou Notre Nymphomanie Auréolé (血まみれのアンヌ嬢・若しくは・我等がニンフォマニアが・後光に包まれる) or Mystic Another Selection Of Nurses Naked Anthology.

Maso also performs as Space Machine using vintage analog synthesizers. He has performed with the psychedelic rock group Christine 23 Onna (with Fusao Toda of Angel'in Heavy Syrup), which then became Acid Eater with the addition of two members, as well as the noise supergroup Bustmonster and the noise trio Flying Testicle.

In 2018, Maso began performing and releasing under the name Controlled Death, and in 2025, Maso started releasing under the name Ja a ku yamiizu lu.

== History ==
Maso has said that he became interested in making noise music when he heard the sounds of destruction on television as a child, but that his first exposure to the Japanese noise genre was Hanatarash's debut LP, which at the time did not impress Maso. It was however later, upon happening on an LP entitled LSD by a Tokyo noise band named Nord, and mistakenly thinking it was an album by the band LSD, that these experiences had possibly kindled his future interest. A year thereafter Maso sought many different types of noise releases in the underground music stores in and around Osaka Japan. Two years would pass until Maso would start to develop his own style of noise and begin producing, at which time he quit listening to the noise albums of others and focused in on his own unique style. Previous to his interest in noise Maso played guitar in several bands, one of which he states in interviews was a Led Zeppelin cover band, playing the occasional Deep Purple song.

All of Maso's projects draw heavily from the psychedelic music scene in outward style, but sonically most of them resemble very few of the traits of late 1960s and 1970s psychedelic music. Maso has an interest in avant-garde films, having stated in interviews that his two favorite movies are the Alexandro Jodorowsky films The Holy Mountain and El Topo. He also claims to admire and had the wish to have worked with American musician Captain Beefheart.

The Masonna project has been the opening act for several well-known artists on their Japanese concert dates, including Sonic Youth, Beck and Slipknot. Masonna also caught the attention of John Peel and was featured on his program, having even done a limited Masonna John Peel Sessions CD.

Masonna is most known for Yamazaki's wild live performances which usually consist of damaging his equipment, jumping around madly, and at times getting injured. He has given entire concerts which last only a few seconds. In 1996 Masonna toured the United States on the "American Mystique Tour" named after his album Inner Mind Mystique.

Maso was also the manager of Jojo Hiroshige's Alchemy Music Store until its closure.

== Discography ==
=== As Masonna ===
- Shinsen Na Clitoris (1990), Vanilla Records
- Mademoiselle Anne Sanglante Ou Notre Nymphomanie Aureole (1993), Alchemy
- Noskl in Ana (1994), Alchemy
- Super Compact Disc (1995), Alchemy
- Noisextra (1995), RRR
- Ejaculation Generater (1996), Alchemy
- Inner Mind Mystique (1996), Relapse
- Hyper Chaotic (1996), V
- Freak-Out Electrolyze (1997), Nanophonica
- Spectrum Ripper (1998), Cold Spring
- Frequency L.S.D. (1998), Alien8
- Vestal Spacy Ritual (1999), Alchemy
- Beauty Beast (1999), Blast First
- Shock Rock (2002), MIDI Creative

=== As Flying Testicle ===
with Merzbow and Zev Asher.

- Lamerican Sextom (1992), ZSF Produkt, Japan, 7"
- Space Desia (1993), Charnel Music, USA, CD

=== As Space Machine ===
- Cosmos From Diode Ladder Filter (2001), Alchemy
- 2 (2002), Midi Creative / Noble
- 3 (2003), Tiliqua (LP), (2004), Important (CD)
