= Solmania =

Japanese musical group

- Katsumi Sugahara performing live with an early/unfinished version of his personal home made guitar built by Masahiko Ohno around 2006

Background information
- Origin: Osaka, Japan
- Genre: Noise
- Years active: 1984–present
- Label: Alchemy
- Members: Masahiko Ohno; Katsumi Sugahara

Solmania (ソルマニア, Sorumania) is a Japanese noise music project, founded in 1984 by Masahiko Ohno (大野雅彦). He was later joined by Katsumi Sugahara (菅原克己) (ex Outo), who first appears on Trembling Tongues (1995). Ohno is known for making his own experimental electric guitars out of spare parts and using them in his live performances and recordings; the guitars usually take an extremely bizarre form, utilizing unconventional body shapes, extra necks, strings and pickups in unusual places, and various extraneous gadgets such as microphones. Ohno has built 9 guitars as of 2026. Most of their instruments are multi-neck guitars and harp guitars.

Masahiko Ohno also works as a graphic designer, and has worked on almost all the releases on Alchemy Records and Hören.

== Discography ==
- Gakinoizz (1984)
- H·A·D·A·Y·R·O (1985)
- Vexation (1985)
- H.C.P. Resolvent (1985)
- Wörkenemy (1985)
- Re-Rurr (1985)
- Energetic Enema (1986) (with Kyōakukyōjindan)
- Highdrophobia (1986)
- Erosion (1987)
- Metamorphor Chorus (1991)
- Morphine Nocturne (1992)
- Psycledelic (1993)
- Trembling Tongues (1995)
- Evil Bed (1996)
- DLO (1998)
- Live-Big Rig (1993)
- The Basement Tapes and Discs (2013)
- Kill (2016)
- Platonic or Guerrilla (2021)
