= RRRecords =

American record label

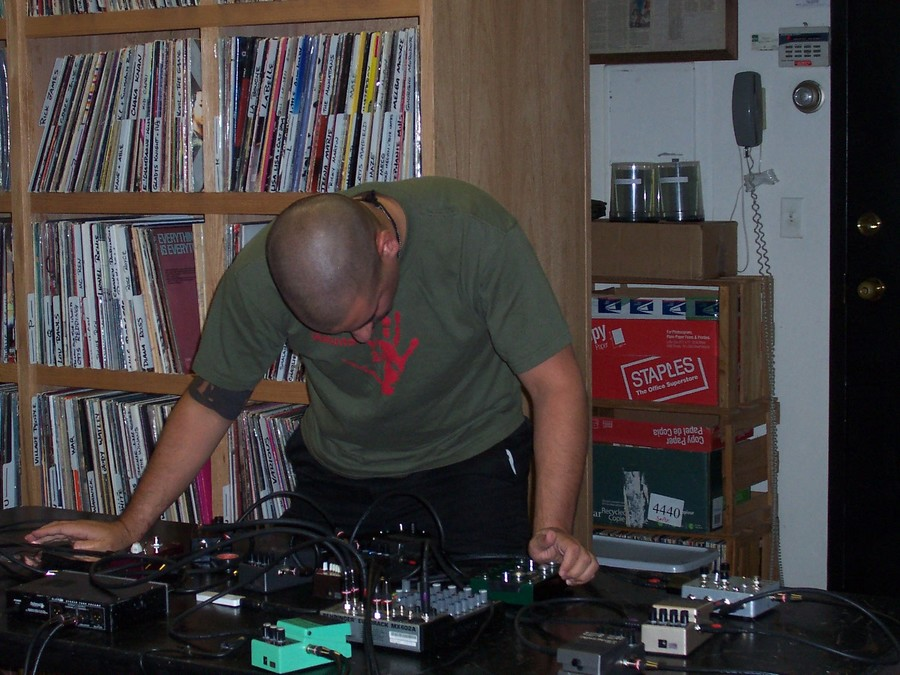
Sickness playing a set inside RRRecords

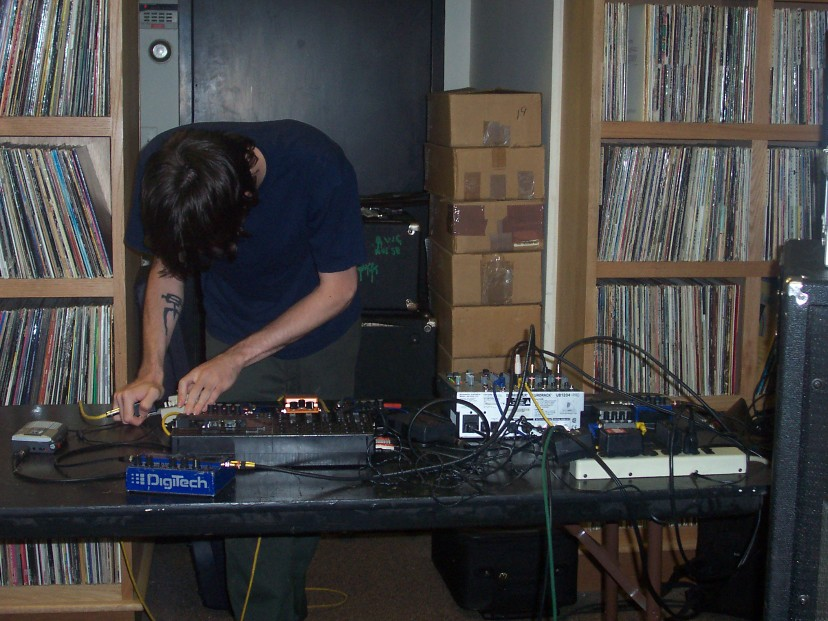
Pedestrian Deposit playing a show at RRR, July 30, 2005

RRRecords is a record label and used- and new-record shop based in Lowell, Massachusetts. RRRecords was the first American record label to publish underground "noise music" in the early 1980s as well as publishing the first American vinyl by Merzbow, Masonna, Hanatarash, Violent Onsen Geisha, and various other artists. In its first twenty years, the label issued hundreds of releases. RRR's owner, Ron Lessard, is a supporter of new artists who has created several sub-labels and series to specifically highlight unknown and underground musicians.

== RRR Sub-labels and series ==
RRRecords is known for its sub-label/series Recycled Music series, which began in 1992 and consists of pre-owned cassette dubbed over with new material from contemporary noise artists. RRRecycled tapes are labeled with a simple strip of adhesive tape along the spine of the insert with the artist's name hand-written upon it. Each recycled release tape is unique, and in some cases, the original audio is still partly audible. They have historically sold for $4 each, in order to encourage curious listeners to take a chance on a band they may not have heard of.

Other sub-labels have included Lowell Records, which only published local rock, punk, and metal bands from Lowell, Massachusetts; Statutory Tapes, who reissued music originally published by Kinky Music Institute, G.R.O.S.S, ZSF Tapes, and Beast 666 Tapes; Pure, a series of low-cost CDs by new and established harsh noise projects, RRReport, a magazine and CD set that existed for two issues; Stomach Ache, a collaborative label by Lessard and other unknown participants that published cheap vinyl singles of dubious provenance. Stomach Ache Records listed only a Mexican mailing address, and credited to the singles to a fictional person named Charlie Ward, so that any responsibility could be deflected. RRR has also collaborated with other labels to produce multi-LP box sets of noise based on specific regions of America. To date these have included New England, California, Texas, Michigan, and Portland.

== Package design ==
In the 1980s and early 1990s, RRRecords was known for elaborate packaging of its records. "Steel Plate" is a double 10" vinyl set by Chop Shop, which came sealed in between two 10" x 10" steel plates. A collaborative LP by SBOTHI, Merzbow, and P16.D4 came packaged in between two silk-screened sheets of plexi-glass. "God Bless America" was a 3xLP box set compilation of American experimental music which came wrapped in a purpose-made American flag.

== Concerts at RRR ==
For a period of a few years in the late 1990s, RRRecords would host free Saturday afternoon concerts at the store, which were called the "2 O'Clock Matinee" series. Concerts were never advertised or promoted, but every one was recorded by Ron Lessard and every band always got paid $20.

== Mail-order ==
Lessard's Xeroxed copies of a mail order list added to underground 'zines circulating in the mid-to-late 1980s had a profound effect on the international noise communities, building interest in the music through minimal, very simple black and white advertisements. Catalogs never included descriptions of bands or records, so a new reader was expected to either already know what they were getting, or else buy things at random. Many of today's noise artists learned about the genre in part by being exposed to RRRecords catalogs.

== See also ==
- List of record labels
