= Hijokaidan =

Japanese noise group

Hijōkaidan
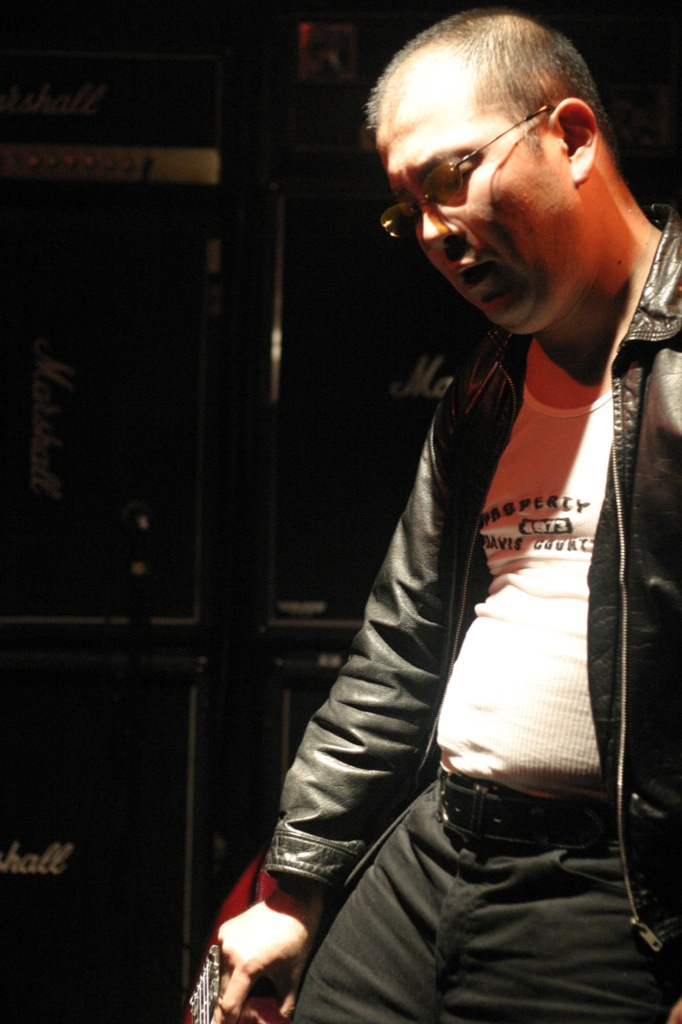
- Jojo Hiroshige in 2007

Background information
- Also known as: Hijyokaidan, Hijo Kaidan Fushoku no Marie, Corroded Marie, the King of Noise
- Origin: Osaka, Japan
- Genres: Noise, free improvisation
- Years active: 1979–present
- Label: Alchemy
- Spinoffs: Bis Kaidan
- Spinoff of: Rasenkaidan, Ultra Bide
- Members: Jojo Hiroshige; Toshiji Mikawa; Junko; Okano Futoshi
- Past members: Naoki Zushi; Katsuhiro Nakajima (a.k.a. Zuke); Toshiyuki Oka; Masako Shigesugi (a.k.a. Mako); Akira Ichiguchi; Koichiro Kami; Hiroko Onishi (a.k.a. Semimaru); Sumireman; Naoto Hayashi; Tomoko Kaiho (a.k.a. Woo); Takeshi Ishida; Mamoru Taniguchi (a.k.a. Taniyan); Yuka; Masami Akita; Nao Shibata; Fumio Kosakai
- Website: www.kt.rim.or.jp

Hijōkaidan (非常階段; emergency staircase) is a Japanese noise and free improvisation group with a revolving lineup that has ranged from two members to as many as fourteen in its early days. The group is the project of guitarist Jojo Hiroshige (JOJO広重), its one constant member, who is head and owner of the Osaka-based Alchemy Records. Other regulars include Jojo's wife Junko and Toshiji Mikawa (also of Incapacitants).

The group began at the very end of the 1970s as a performance art-based group whose anarchic shows would often involve destruction of venues and audio equipment, food and garbage being thrown around, and on-stage urination. As the group's lineup changed over time, their focus became less performance-based and more musically based, fine-tuning their sound into a dense wall of noise.

== History ==
=== Pre-Hijōkaidan ===
Hijōkaidan originally began in 1979 in Kyoto as a side project of Rasenkaidan members Jojo Hiroshige (JOJO広重) and Naoki Zushi (頭士奈生樹). They played an improvised session at a studio with fellow Rasenkaidan member Ken'ichi Takayama (高山謙一) (a.k.a. Idiot) in attendance. Afterwards, Takayama said "This is not Rasenkaidan (螺旋階段; spiral staircase), it is more like Hijōkaidan (非常階段; emergency staircase)."

This Hijōkaidan played live twice and recorded a few studio sessions. Recordings of this line-up were later released as Original Hijōkaidan or Pre-Hijōkaidan. After their second performance, Zushi left, and Jojo decided to quit his existing musical projects (Hijōkaidan, Rasenkaidan, and Ultra Bide). Idiot and Zushi briefly continued Rasenkaidan, and Idiot later formed Idiot O'Clock.

=== Corroded Marie ===
In the spring of 1980, Jojo formed a new group called Corroded Marie (腐食のマリィ, Fushoku no Marie) to play songs in the style of Hawkwind. Initial members were Jojo, Toshiyuki Oka (岡俊行) (a.k.a. Oka), Katsuhiro Nakajima (a.k.a. Zuke), Masako Shigesugi (a.k.a. Mako), Akira Ichiguchi (市口章) (a.k.a. Ichie), and Toshiji Mikawa (美川俊治). Zushi declined to take part. The practice sessions devolved into improvised noise, and Jojo considered disbanding the group, but was convinced otherwise by Oka, Zuke, and Ichiguchi.

In June 1980, Corroded Marie was invited to play ACB Hall in Shinjuku, Tokyo at the event Heavenly Injection Night (天国注射の夜, Tengoku Chūsha no Yoru), sponsored by the magazine Heaven and arranged by Tōri Kudō (工藤冬里). By mistake, they were billed as Hijōkaidan, Jojo decided to keep the name. After the show Mako left. Disappointed that they didn't play songs or like Hawkwind, Jojo again thought about disbanding the group. He listened to a cassette of the performance repeatedly, and began to consider the possibility of releasing it. In August he met Naoto Hayashi (林直人), who had started an independent label called Unbalance Records, and made a deal to release the show. He contacted Zuke and Oka about releasing the show and asked if they wanted to continue the group. Jojo discovered that they were thinking about continuing as a new group without him.

On November 3, the regrouped Hijōkaidan played at Sōzōdōjō in Osaka. The show started with a cover of "It's a Rainy Day, Sunshine Girl" by Faust, before turning into free-form noise. This show is also the beginning of the performance art aspect of Hijōkaidan's live show, with Zuke throwing around takoyaki.

The ACB show was released as one side of a split LP called Shūmatsu-Shorijō (終末処理場; sewage treatment plant) in December 1980 by Unbalance, the other side had tracks by NG and Jurajium. The track was called "腐食のマリィ" in honor of their original name.

== Alchemy Records ==
Alchemy Records is a record label run by Jojo Hiroshige, based in Osaka, Japan and specializing in noise / experimental music and psychedelic rock. Alchemy has released albums by Hijokaidan, Balzac, Hanatarash, Masonna, Incapacitants, Borbetomagus, Nihilist Spasm Band and Merzbow, among many others. Until April 2008, Alchemy also had a record store in Osaka's Amerikamura.

== Notes ==
- Mikawa, Toshiji; Hiroshige, Jojo (1992–1995). "The Hijokaidan Story". G-Modern. Translated by Alan Cummings.
- Hiroshige, Jojo (June 19, 2009). "The Thirtieth Anniversary of Hijokaidan". The Noise (Media notes). Hijokaidan. Alchemy Records.
- 非常階段: A Story of the King of Noise. Translated by Romain Hebert. K&B Publishers. September 3, 2010. ISBN 978-4902800173. Archived from the original on October 14, 2014.
