= Hanatarash =

Japanese noise band

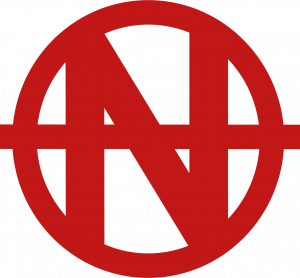
- Hanatarash logo.

Background information
- Also known as: Hanatarashi
- Origin: Osaka, Japan
- Genres: Noise; japanoise; danger music; industrial; noisecore; harsh noise
- Years active: 1983–1998
- Labels: Condome Cassex, Alchemy Records, Public Bath, RRRecords, Shock City Records
- Past members: Yamantaka Eye; Ikuo Taketani; Jojo Hiroshige

Hanatarashi (ハナタラシ), meaning "sniveler" or "snot-nosed" in Japanese, was a noise band created by Yamantaka Eye in Osaka, Japan in 1983. The other core member during the early years was Ikuo Taketani. After the release of the first album, the "I" was dropped and the name became "Hanatarash". Both men later formed Boredoms, and Taketani played drums for Zeni Geva.

They used a variety of unusual noise-making objects, including power tools, drills, and heavy machinery.

== History ==
Hanatarash was formed by Yamantaka Eye and Taketani Ikuo. From 1985 onwards, the band released three self-titled albums.

In 1989, Ron Lessard of RRRecords released a Hanatarash demo cassette on vinyl without waiting for the master tape Eye intended to send. This misunderstanding, due to cultural and linguistic differences between the Japanese musician and the American label, became legendary among fans.

The band ceased operations in 1998.

== Live shows ==
Hanatarash was notorious for their dangerous live shows. Some of the band's most infamous shows included Eye cutting a dead cat in half with a machete, strapping a circular saw to his back and almost cutting his leg off, and destroying part of a venue with an excavator by driving it through the back wall and onto the stage.

Hanatarash was quickly forbidden from performing at most venues.

== Music style ==
Hanatarash is affiliated with the Japanoise scene. They use a wide range of incongruous objects to make noise, including power tools such as drills and large construction machines. Despite the spectacular brutality and chaos of their performances, the noise produced by the destruction of unamplified objects is often drowned out by the cries of the audience.

== Partial discography ==
- ハナヅマリ (Condome Cassex, 1983)
- Honey Go-Go Cassete (Condome Cassex, 1984)
- Noisexa Cassete (Condome Cassex, 1984)
- Man Of Noise=ノイズ個人 (Condome Cassex, 1984)
- Dead Eye (Condome Cassex, 1984)
- Take Back Your Penis! Cassette (Condome Cassex, 1984)
- Bombraining (Condome Cassex, 1984)
- Texas Chainsaw Massacre!! (Not On Label 1984)
- Hanatarashi LP (Alchemy, 1985)
- 2 LP (Alchemy, 1988)
- 3 LP (RRRecords, 1989) CD (RRRecords, 1992)
- Live!! 88 Feb. 21 Antiknock / Tokyo CD (MoM'n'DaD Productions, 1992)
- The Hanatarash and His eYe 7" (Public Bath, 1992)
- Live!! 84 Dec. 16 Zabo-Kyoto CD (MoM'n'DaD Productions, 1993)
- Live!! 82 Apr. 12 Studio Ahiru / Osaka CD (MoM'n'DaD Productions, 1993)
- 4: AIDS-a-Delic CD (Public Bath, 1994)
- 5: We Are 0:00 CD (Shock City, Trattoria, 1996)
