= List of noise musicians =

The following is a list of artists who make noise music.

== A ==
- Maryanne Amacher
- Anenzephalia
- Astro
- Kenneth Atchley
- Atrax Morgue
- Aube

== B ==
- Bastard Noise
- Emil Beaulieau
- Philip Best
- Maurizio Bianchi
- Black Dice
- Borbetomagus
- Brighter Death Now
- Bull of Heaven

== C ==
- C.C.C.C.
- Rutherford Chang
- Antoine Chessex
- Chop Shop
- Club Moral
- Cock E.S.P.
- Controlled Bleeding
- Cui Jian

== D ==
- Danny Devos
- Diesel Guitar
- Aaron Dilloway
- Kevin Drumm
- John Duncan

== E ==
- Esplendor Geométrico

== G ==
- Genocide Organ
- The Gerogerigegege
- Government Alpha

== H ==
- Hair Police
- Hafler Trio
- Hanatarash
- Russell Haswell
- The Haters
- Florian Hecker
- Hijokaidan
- Kommissar Hjuler

== I ==
- If, Bwana
- Incapacitants
- In Slaughter Natives

== J ==
- GX Jupitter-Larsen

== K ==
- Zbigniew Karkowski
- KK Null

== L ==
- Lingua Ignota

== M ==
- Macronympha
- Mama Baer
- Lasse Marhaug
- Masonna
- Mattin
- Mauthausen Orchestra
- Daniel Menche
- Merzbow
- Metal Machine Trio
- Metalux
- Minóy
- Monde Bruits
- Thurston Moore
- Morphogenesis

== N ==
- Nautical Almanac
- Nihilist Spasm Band
- Nordvargr

== O ==
- Otomo Yoshihide

== P ==
- P16.D4
- Panicsville
- Pharmakon
- Dave Phillips (musician)
- Prurient
- Puce Mary

== R ==
- Ramleh
- Richard Ramirez
- Boyd Rice (NON)
- Antonio Russolo
- Luigi Russolo

== S ==
- Sleep Chamber
- Smegma
- Solmania
- Howard Stelzer

== T ==
- Terrestrial Tones
- Throbbing Gristle
- To Live and Shave in L.A.

== V ==
- V/Vm
- Violent Onsen Geisha

== W ==
- Wapstan
- John Wiese
- Whitehouse
- Wolf Eyes

== X ==
- Xotox

== Y ==
- Justice Yeldham
- Yellow Swans

== See also ==
- List of industrial music bands
- List of Japanoise artists
- List of noise rock bands
