= List of Japanoise artists =

This is an alphabetical list of Japanese noise, or "Japanoise" (ジャパノイズ) bands and solo projects that have articles on Wikipedia.

Project Name	Project Name In Japanese	Artists Involved	Artists' Names In Japanese
Acid Mothers Temple		Kawabata Makoto	河端 一
Astro	アストロ	Hiroshi Hasegawa	長谷川洋
Aube	オウブ	Akifumi Nakajima	中嶋昭文
Boredoms	ボアダムス	Yamatsuka "Eye" Tetsuro, Yamamoto Seiichi, Yoshimi P-We	山塚徹郎 / 山塚アイ, 山本精一, 横田佳美
C.C.C.C.	シー･シー･シー･シー	Hiroshi Hasegawa, Mayuko Hino, Ryūichi Nagakubo, Fumio Kosakai	長谷川洋, 日野繭子, 長久保隆一, 小堺文雄
Crack Fierce	クラック･フィアース	Hideki Kato	加藤英樹
Diesel Guitar	ディーゼル・ギター	Youki Noseyama	能勢山陽生 / 能勢山ヨウキ
Fushitsusha	不失者	Keiji Haino	灰野敬二
The Gerogerigegege	ザ・ゲロゲリゲゲゲ	Juntarō Yamanouchi, Tetsuya Endō	山ノ内純太郎
Government Alpha	ガヴァーンメント･アルファ	Yasutoshi Yoshida	吉田恭淑
Hanatarash	ハナタラシ	Yamatsuka "Eye" Tetsuro, Yamamoto Seiichi	山塚徹郎 / 山塚アイ, 山本精一
Hijōkaidan	非常階段	Yoshiyuki "Jojo" Hiroshige	広重嘉之 / JOJO広重
Incapacitants	インキャパシタンツ	Toshiji Mikawa, Fumio Kosakai	美川俊治
KK Null	ケー･ケー･ヌル	Kazuyuki Kishino	岸野一之
Mainliner		Kawabata Makoto, Asahito Nanjo	
Masonna	マゾンナ	Takushi "Maso" Yamazaki	山崎卓志 / 山崎マゾ
Melt-Banana		Yasuko Onuki, Ichirou Agata	
Merzbow	メルツバウ	Masami Akita	秋田昌美
Monde Bruits	モンド・ブリュイッツ	Syohei Iwasaki	岩崎昇平
Ruins	ルインズ	Tatsuya Yoshida, Hisashi Sasaki	吉田達也, 佐々木恒
Solmania	ソルマニア	Masahiko 'Masaki' Ohno	大野昌輝
Space Streakings	スペース・ストリーキングス	Captain Insect, Kame Bazooka, Karate Condor, Screaming Stomach	
Violent Onsen Geisha	暴力温泉芸者 / ボウリョク・オンセン・ゲイシャ	Masaya Nakahara	中原昌也
Zeni Geva	제니 게바	KK Null, Tatsuya Yoshida, Mitsuru Tabata, Eito Noro	岸野一之, 吉田達也

== See also ==
- Improvised Music from Japan
- Japanoise
- List of experimental musicians
- List of musicians by genre
- List of noise musicians
- Noise music
