= Generator Sound Art =

Coordinates: 40.74536°N 73.99887°W

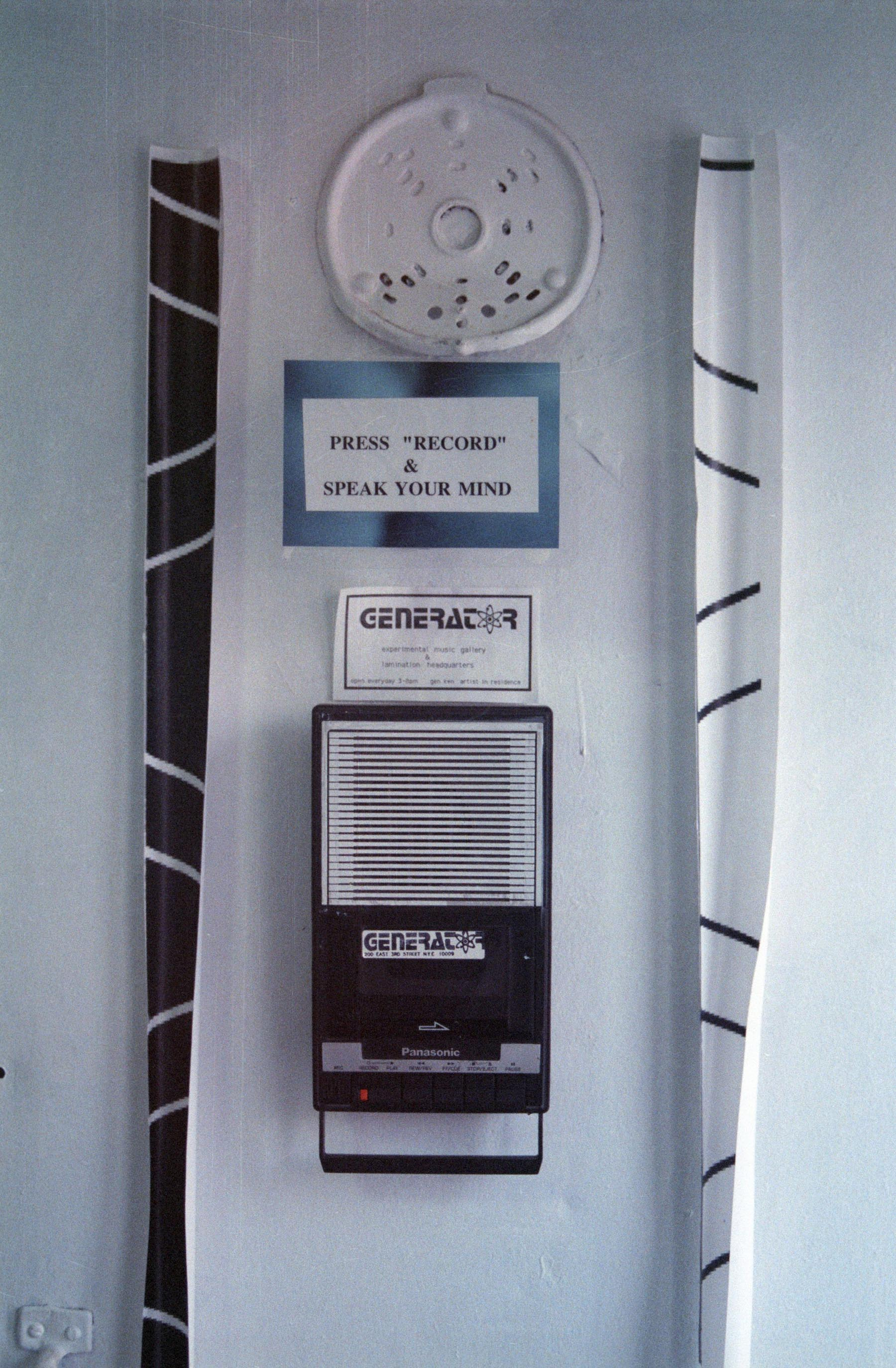
Interactive cassette player at the entrance of Generator gallery, 1989

Generator Sound Art was an experimental arts and culture organization based in New York City, co-owned by the sound artists Gen Ken Montgomery and Scott Konzelmann. It focused upon the work of dedicated Sound Artists, and was an umbrella organization that facilitated the activities of the Generator Gallery / exhibition space, the Generations Unlimited audio recording label, and a second, eponymous audio recording label. Generator as a physical gallery / exhibition space existed in the East Village and then in Chelsea from 1989 to 1992.

The organization was non-commercial. Profits earned from Generator-related activities are split between the artists and a fund to support future sound art projects. Generator's emphasis on handmade, self-released audio works derives from the "cassette networking" or "Cassette culture" milieu of the 1980s–1990s. The embrace of spontaneity and unintended consequences is another recurrent theme within Generator-affiliated work.

== History ==
=== Gen Ken Montgomery ===
Generator's founder and proprietor Ken Montgomery (aka Gen Ken Montgomery) (born 1957) is a New York-based sound artist raised in Churchville, Pennsylvania, where he studied violin in his late childhood and early teens. Since 1994, he has used the "Gen Ken" moniker for sound art / noise music (he also uses the anagrammatic moniker "Egnekn" for "more whimsical and especially lamination-based projects.") As to the latter, Montgomery's "lamination ritual" is a staple of his performance oeuvre, described by the artist as "a people-participatory activity and sonic listening experience which stimulates the mind and body in-the-moment, while producing an original, tangible, transformed personal object that will last…almost forever." Among Montgomery's formative influences are the theories of composer John Cage – particularly those outlined in Cage's 1961 collection of writings, Silence – and the participatory work ethic of the German electronic musician (and Joseph Beuys protégé) Conrad Schnitzler (for whom Montgomery gave the first U.S. concerts, and first met during the sole German performance of 'KMZ' in 1982.)

Having originally planned to work as a filmmaker – briefly studying at NYU for this purpose – Montgomery claims "I quickly discovered I was approaching [filmmaking] with the soundtrack already in my mind." Montgomery worked, from the early 1980s until 1991, with traditional electronic music instruments such as analog synthesizers and cheap toys, originally recording this material under the project name "Gen Ken & The Equipment." The artist also enjoyed a period of access to a professional recording studio with synthesizers, samplers and signal processing equipment. At the end of this period of creativity, an interval of flagging inspiration led Montgomery to experiment with the use of quotidian household devices as instruments: these included an 'Ice-o-Matic' commercial icemaker which was used both in concert and in the CD recording Icebreaker. This was not an abrupt shift in methodology, but rather a return to an expressive style previously experimented with. As he explains:

"In my East Village apartment in the late '70s, I remember throwing parties and instead of playing music I turned on kitchen appliances, tape players, fans, radios and a TV tuned between stations…I made my first installations before I knew that audio installations and sound art existed."

Other forays into appliance-based sound works included recordings and performances made with a Keystone Model 16CC film projector, a radiator, a coffee maker, and a refrigerator (Montgomery claims that refrigerator recordings were originally made as a protest to his landlord about the excessive noise of the unit he then owned.) The 2002 double CD compilation Pondfloorsample collects much of the audio material created from re-appropriated devices and appliances.

By 1994, citing another period of creative burnout, Montgomery took a sabbatical in Europe and then set up residence in rural Pennsylvania. This period saw the initiation of another project using found objects – the Eight Track Magic series of recordings – which were made of audio re-recorded from severely damaged eight track cassettes.

Montgomery is also allied with the Kingdoms of Elgaland-Vargaland micronation established by artists Leif Elggren and Carl Michael von Hausswolff, for whom he oversees the Ministry of Lamination.

=== Generations Unlimited ===
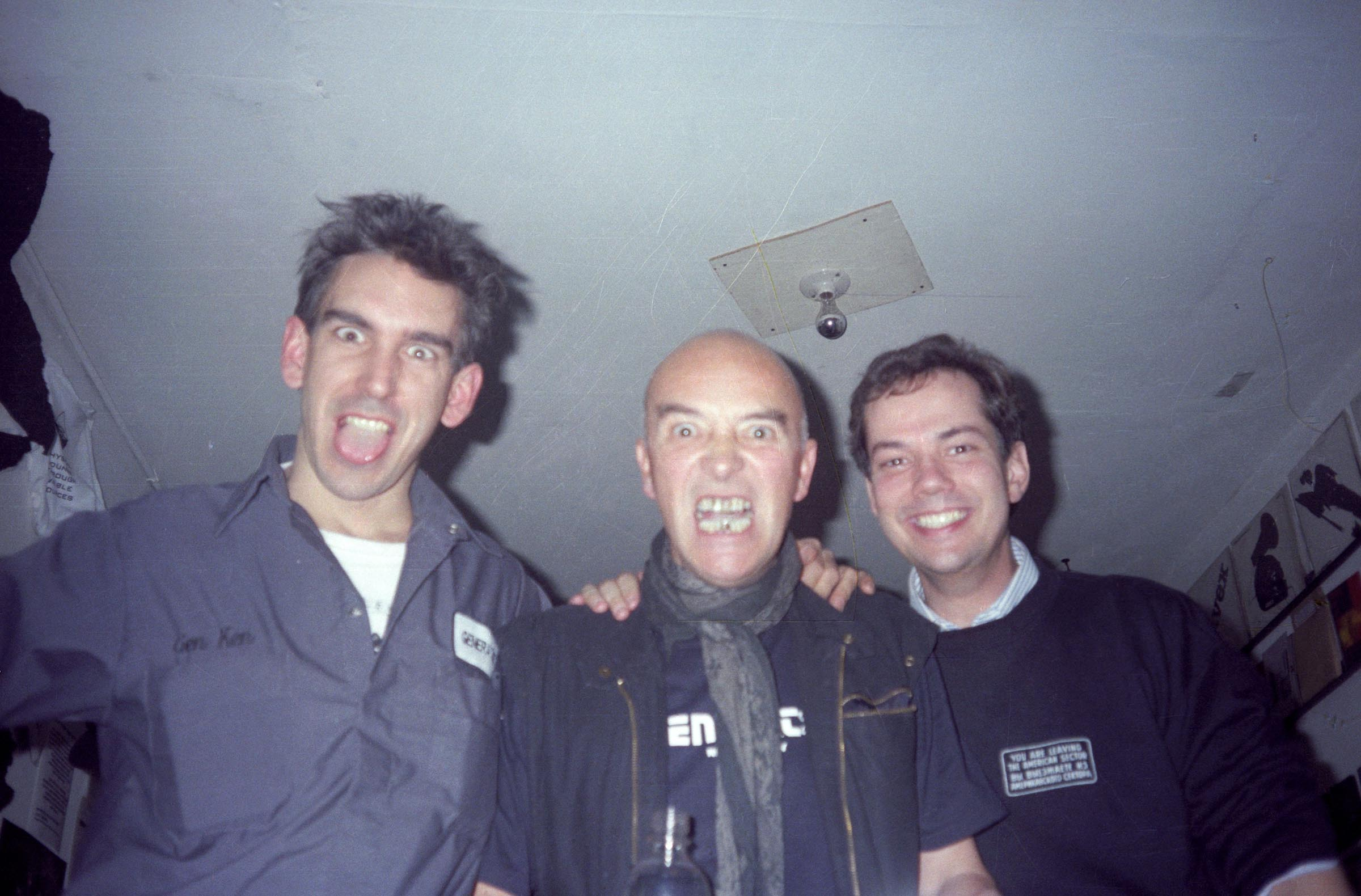
(from left to right) Gen Ken Montgomery, Conrad Schnitzler, David Prescott

The Generations Unlimited record and cassette label was co-founded in 1987 along with Boston sound artist David Prescott (who was also a partner in the Pogus Productions record label) and featured releases from an artist roster including Conrad Schnitzler, Arcane Device, Iancu Dumitrescu and Morphogenesis. According to Prescott, the label formed in the wake of ongoing discussions between Schnitzler, Montgomery and himself, in which they "found that we had not only a lot in common, but particularly interesting differences which led to our each strengthening and developing out notions of music, art and life." As with other collaborative products involving Montgomery, the label was conceived as an alternative to both New Age currents of electronic music and also the more exclusively academic variations thereof (in a contemporaneous interview, Prescott stated that "[our] music exists between what is typically thought to be 'academic' and 'pop' oriented…the farther these labels have gone, the more it becomes apparent that this delineation doesn't exist." In lieu of an already existing musical categorization, Generations Unlimited products were marketed as "dramatic electronic music."

=== Generator Experimental Music Gallery ===
The Generator Experimental Music Gallery was founded on June 1, 1989, on 3rd & Avenue B in New York City's East Village. This was a multi-purpose arts space that hosted exhibitions, installations and performances of sound art, while also functioning as a boutique shop and meeting place / information exchange. On this last count, the space was noted in particular for its connection to the 'Cassette Culture' networks of the 1980s and the 1990s, and for its status as a "centralized location where at least one segment of the cassette underground could congregate": a rarity in an artistic milieu that otherwise relied upon postal communication and mini-media such as fanzines to initiate and maintain contacts. Montgomery stressed, in addition, that the Generator space not be "reduced to any one of these things," and encouraged a concept for the space that involved "'turning [his] apartment inside out'," or a blurring of personal boundaries in which "all the things he had previously done at home would be moved to a storefront where anyone could walk in off the street and see what was happening."

The foundation of the Generator space was partially inspired by Montgomery's trips to Europe, in which he encountered likeminded multi-purpose venues (citing the Staaltape cassette shop in Amsterdam and the Gelbe Musik in Berlin as significant influences in this regard): "I saw all these kinds of places and every time I came back to New York I got very frustrated, because it seemed like there was nothing like that here."

Some of the distinguishing visual and interactive features of the Generator space were cassette players attached to the walls for visitors to record on, while aural experiments (e.g. Montgomery's claim of "several sound systems running simultaneously") occasionally took the place of simple playback of recordings. The basement of the space was set aside for performances once local curiosity about the space was piqued, and performances here regularly took place in complete or near-complete darkness. This space would eventually close in 1990 (its 1-year anniversary) owing to a number of converging factors, including the economic situation of the neighborhood's residents (i.e. their operating on little more than a subsistence income), and the propensity of the potential customers or visitors to already be sound producers themselves, and thus presumably less interested in buying new sound recordings.

A second iteration of Generator, existing from June 1991 until June 1992 on 547 West 20th Street in the Chelsea district, differed from the original space in many salient respects. As opposed to being a ground floor / streetside space in a commercial district – making it suitable for "walk-ins" – the newer space was in a heavily industrialized zone with scant pedestrian traffic. Exhibiting hours were from 12-6pm on Saturdays and 2-6pm on Sundays, while personal visits could also be arranged via appointment. Given this decreased likelihood of visits from strangers, the 'shop' aspect of Generator was de-emphasized in favor of its role as a performance and exhibition space. Like the original Generator, though, the inspiration for its establishment lay partially in Montgomery's trans-Atlantic communications and collaborations, and the perceived disparity in available performance and installation spaces in Europe. As he recalls,

"When I started thinking about the artists that I knew working with sound, and some of them had given shows in Europe and other places, and there was no real place for them in New York, I thought it would be exciting to invite these people to come and do it here."

=== Performances / live events ===
The following is an abridged chronology of public events to have taken place in the different Generator spaces from 1991 to 1992.

Exhibitions

- June 1 – July 31, 1991: The Reincarnation of Generator – Arcane Device, Alvin Lucier, CHOP SHOP, Gordon Monahan, Laura Kikauka, Mary & Bill Buchen & Ron Kuivila
- August 23 – September 8, 1991: Entropy – Tim Sweet, GX Jupitter-Larsen, Luigi-Bob Drake, Mariano Airaldi, Roxy Middquendorf & Scott Konzelmann
- September 14 – October 6, 1991: Nicolas Collins, "Sputniks"
- October 11 – November 16, 1991 Gordon Monahan ("Music From Nowhere"), Laura Kikauka ("Headspace")
- November 24 – January 5, 1991: Ron Kuivila, "Dolci Mura"
- January 25 – March 1, 1992: Ken Butler, "Man's Angles"
- March 20 – April 5, 1992: Gen Ken Montgomery, "Icebreaker"
- April 10 – May 23, 1992: Chop Shop, "Velocity & Vibration"

Concerts

- June 26, 1991: "Live Sound Manifestation" – Gordon Monahan, Laura Kikauka, Ron Kuivila, Arcane Device, Charles Cohen, Bradley Eros, Jeanne Liotta, Leah Singer, Eric Schefter, Matty Jankowski, Gen Ken & Mariano Airaldi
- August 23, 1991: If, Bwana (Al Margolis), Dan & Detta Andriano & Matty Jankowski, Trigger (Fred Lonberg-Holm, Leslie Ross & Paul Hoskin)
- August 24, 1991: The Haters, Gen Ken
- August 25, 1991: Charles Cohen, Conrad Schnitzler
- October 11, 1991: Nicolas Collins & Ben Neill, Ben Manley
- October 12, 1991: Ron Kuivila, Arcane Device
- October 13, 1991: Mariano Airaldi & Gen Ken
- December 29, 1991: GX Jupitter-Larsen, Busyditch, Monty Cantsin
- February 28, 1992: Ken Butler & Dina Emerson
- March 24, 1992: John Duncan
- March 28, 1992: Michael Schell, Fast Forward & Ikue Mori
- April 24, 1992: Paul Panhuysen
- June 7, 1992 : Small Cruel Party / Wolfgang und Die Stuermer

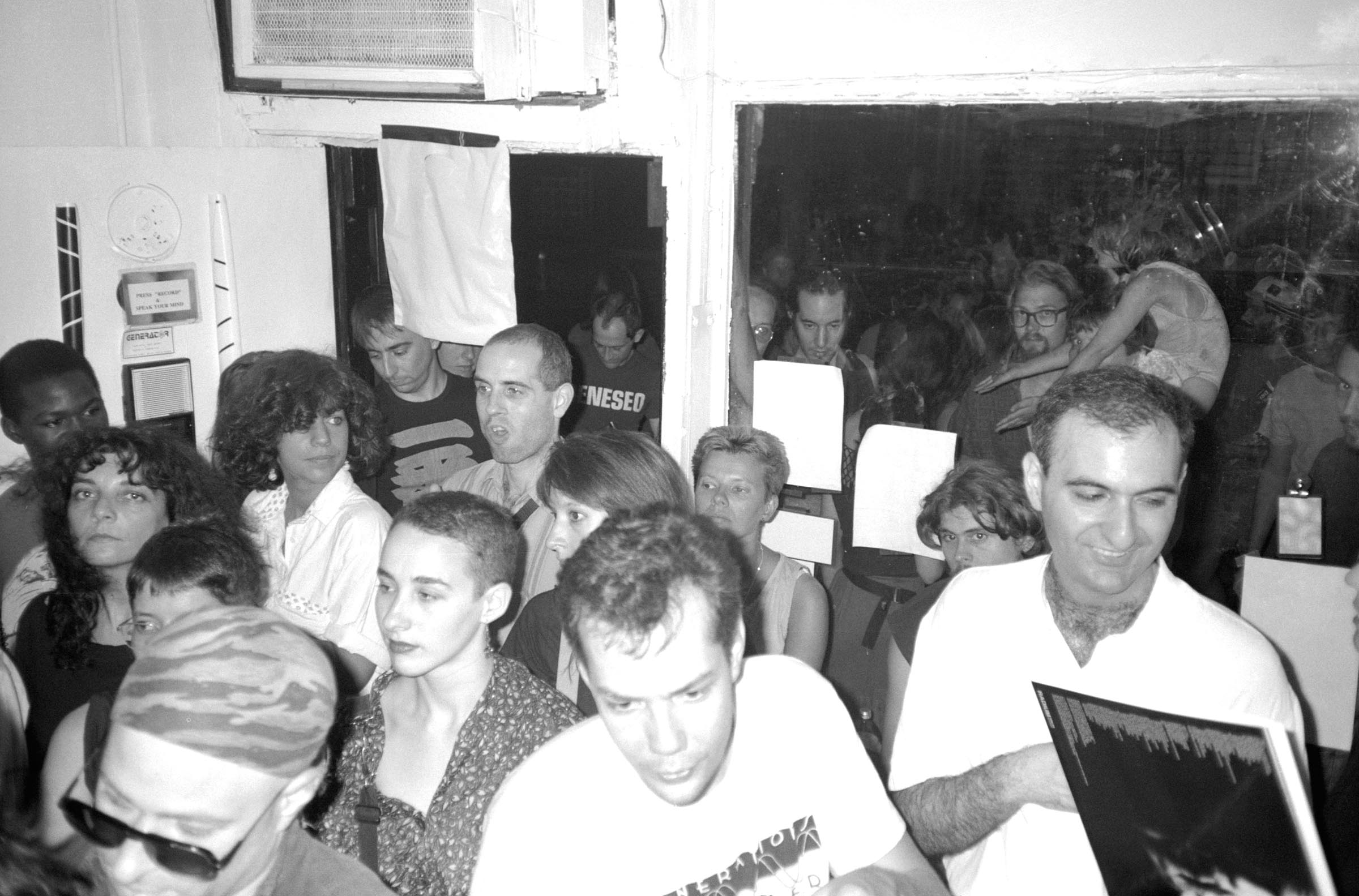
audience at Generator, 1990

Upon the folding of the original Generator location, a Sunday evening performance series – "Generator at Webo" – was initiated at the Webo performance space as a means of offering further events in the spirit of the original Generator series.

A CD-R archive of past Generator performances is also maintained by Montgomery, who makes these archival materials available for sale via the official Generator Sound Arts web presence. These discs are taken from the same source material as the original 'Live at Generator' cassette series, in which each release included a chrome cassette, a photograph, and a story relating to the performance from which the recording was taken.

In 2015, Montgomery released a special limited edition cassette that he curated called Master Cactus.

=== Artists Throwing Money Out The Window ===
"Artists Throwing Money Out The Window" is a Generator Sound Arts sub-label focusing more exclusively on conceptual recordings, non-music and "irritainment." Items in the catalog include a CD recording of WFMU disc jockey Fabio Roberti's car muffler, a CD of 16mm educational film soundtracks curated by AV Geeks, and a CD jewel case containing no playable media inside. Not all A.T.M.O.T.W. releases are done in this mold, however: the compilation release Links Outta Here is a selection of material recorded in tribute to the late Abigail Lavine.

== See also ==
- Cassette culture
- Sound art
- Conrad Schnitzler
- Staalplaat
