= America Salutes Merzbow =

Compilation album
- Released: April 5, 1996
- Genre: Noise
- Length: 64:00
- Label: Vinyl Communications

Professional ratings
Review scores
Source	Rating
Allmusic	2/5 stars

America Salutes Merzbow, subtitled The Lowest Tribute: A Collection of Merzbow Classics as Covered by America's Lowest!, is a 1996 tribute album featuring 23 artists covering various works by Merzbow.

== Track listing ==
No.	Title	Artist	Length
1.	"Rod Drug '95"	Lesser	3:18
2.	"Uluk Reconstruction"	John Hudak	1:58
3.	"42 Pounds of Chiplings"	Free Base Wusabi	3:05
4.	"Autokitty Go No Go"	Small Cruel Party	2:08
5.	"S.C.U.M.P."	Chop Shop	1:58
6.	"Antimonument"	Chemical Toybox	2:02
7.	"Jones-san Kon Ban-wa"	AMK	1:50
8.	"Lowest Music & Arts"	Speculum Fight	2:04
9.	"Crash in Hi-Fi"	Greifer	0:43
10.	"Road-Seaching Electric Sound from the Super-Charged Nineties!"	Physics	5:51
11.	"Christinaudile"	Fin	3:25
12.	"Electro Nuts"	Blackhumour	3:14
13.	"Brain Forest for Metal Digital Concrete (7-16-95)"	Allegory Chapel Ltd.	2:42
14.	"Crash in Hi-Fi"	Lucas	3:29
15.	"White Prickes, Yellow Pricks, Black Pricks, Brown Pricks..."	Con-Dom	2:01
16.	"Seishi Sappuku Kei"	The Spacewörm	3:59
17.	"Border"	Alger Hiss	3:08
18.	"Weltanschauung"	Big City Orchestra	3:13
19.	"Breathe"	Anal Sadist	3:12
20.	"#5"	UCLA Experimental Workshop	5:11
21.	"Thank You Thank You"	Gen Ken	2:02
22.	"Lead You Towards Glorious Times (vTI-99/4A)"	Pea Hix	0:25
23.	"Crocidura Dsi Nezumi"	The Haters	3:00
