= Vomir =

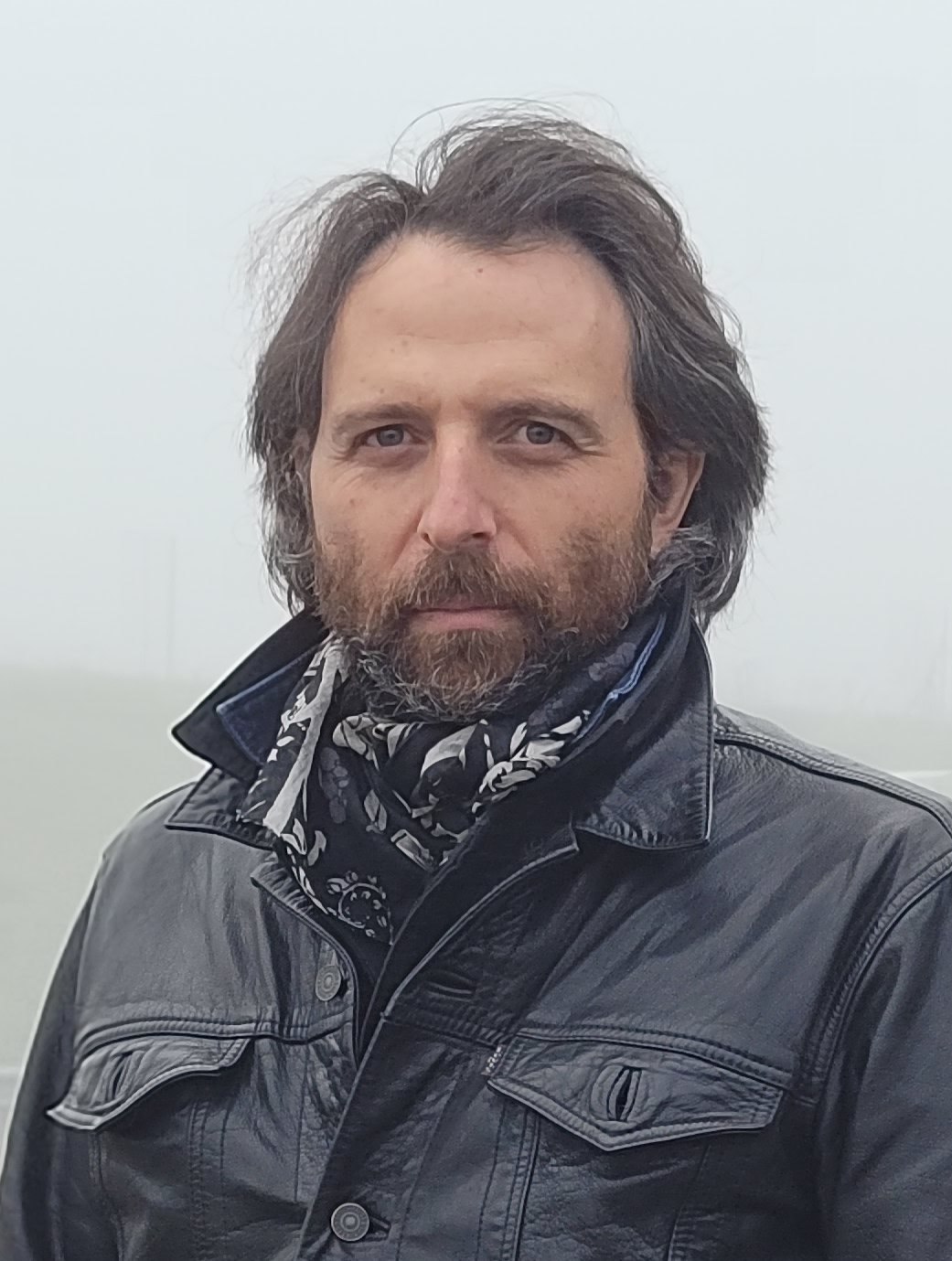
- Vomir in 2020

Background information
- Also known as: Trou Aux Rats, Roro Perrot
- Born: 1973 (age 52–53)
- Origin: Paris, France
- Genres: Harsh noise, harsh noise wall
- Years active: 1996–present
- Label: Decimation Sociale
- Website: www.decimationsociale.com

Romain Perrot (born 1973), better known by his stage name Vomir (French for 'vomit' or 'regurgitate'), is a French noise music artist based in Paris. Since beginning his career in 1996, Vomir has appeared in over 300 releases, including singles, albums and collaborations with other noise artists. The majority of his albums were produced by his own independent label, Decimation Sociale. Vomir positions his approach to music as an "anti-" approach, with a radical and nihilist stance. He spearheads the harsh noise wall movement, an extreme subgenre of noise music which he describes as "no ideas, no change, no development, no entertainment, no remorse".

At a young age Perrot was heavily influenced by Pink Floyd and taught himself how to perform music in his childhood. In the 1990s, he moved closer to the experimental scene by frequenting artists Bimbo Tower, U-Bahn and Instants Chavirés, but it was through the discovery of Japanoise from Merzbow and Keiji Haino that he was introduced to the free improvisation and harsh noise genres. He became fond of The Rita and his self-titled genre "militant walls", which led him to term the genre harsh noise wall, which he began to produce under the stage name Vomir in 2006.

Vomir is the founder and head organiser of Harsh Noise Wall Festival, organised at Les Instants Chavirés, Montreuil, Seine-Saint-Denis. He has collaborated with Marc Hurtado, Rotted Brain, Écoute la Merde, Werewolf Jerusalem, Government Alpha and Torturing Nurse among several others.

== History ==
In 2006 Perrot began going under the name Vomir. With this training, he worked on monolithic walls of static noise, and became one of the representatives of the harsh noise wall genre. He enjoys international recognition and performs regularly in France and abroad.

This listening leads the audience outside the common and conventional modalities of musical structure. For Perrot, a wall of noise exists when noise remains complete, continuous and constant, from start to finish, without alteration or fluctuation. However, this super powerful wall, made with the bare minimum, can be perceived differently by each listener. Through its productions, Vomir seeks to create an opportunity to experience the feeling of confinement and isolation through sound. He also conceives of noise music as a form of non-violent anarchism. Vomir's nihilistic manifesto translates this desire to access a state of free consciousness, in the rejection of manipulative entertainment socialization:

"No ideas, no change, no development, no entertainment, no remorse".

== Artistry ==
=== Influences ===
The discovery of Pink Floyd aged 11 introduced him to an attentive listening to music and to complex musical universes, whose albums constitute an entity, like Lou Reed's Metal Machine Music, which Romain Perrot considers "an exemplary record". He is particularly interested in the catalog of the SST label (Black Flag, Sonic Youth), repetitive (La Monte Young), or industrial (Throbbing Gristle) music.

In the 1990s, he moved closer to the experimental scene by hanging out with Bimbo Tower, U-Bahn and Instants Chavirés. He listened to Songs of Praise on Aligre FM and attended live shows every Monday evening before joining the show between 1999 and 2005.

It was through the discovery of the "Japanoise" from Merzbow, and particularly the Japanese artist Keiji Haino, that he was introduced to the free noise and harsh noise genres. Then by the work of The Rita and his label Militant Walls, at the origin of the term Harsh Noise Wall.

=== An "Anti" approach ===
Perrot positions himself in a radical and nihilist "anti" approach.

He has no musical theory nor instrumental training and does not aim, in his practice, to develop these skills. His approach emphasizes the absence of know-how and musicality in an assertive way. He also claims to be an "anti-artist" who "in the instrument and the noise, (I) really discovers letting go".

To build his universe, he acquires guitars, amps, synthesizers and instinctively uses these instruments to generate raw sounds. All of his noise projects adopt this "anti-music" approach, allowing him to transcribe his disillusions and his rejection of a constituted order.

=== Decimation Sociale ===
Perrot created his own label in 2012 on which he produces his personal projects and collaborations.

The Social Decimation Manifesto uncompromisingly takes up the philosophy inherent in its projects: "No Act / No Play / No Point / No Result / No Strategy / No Compromise / No Social Lubricant."

== Performance ==
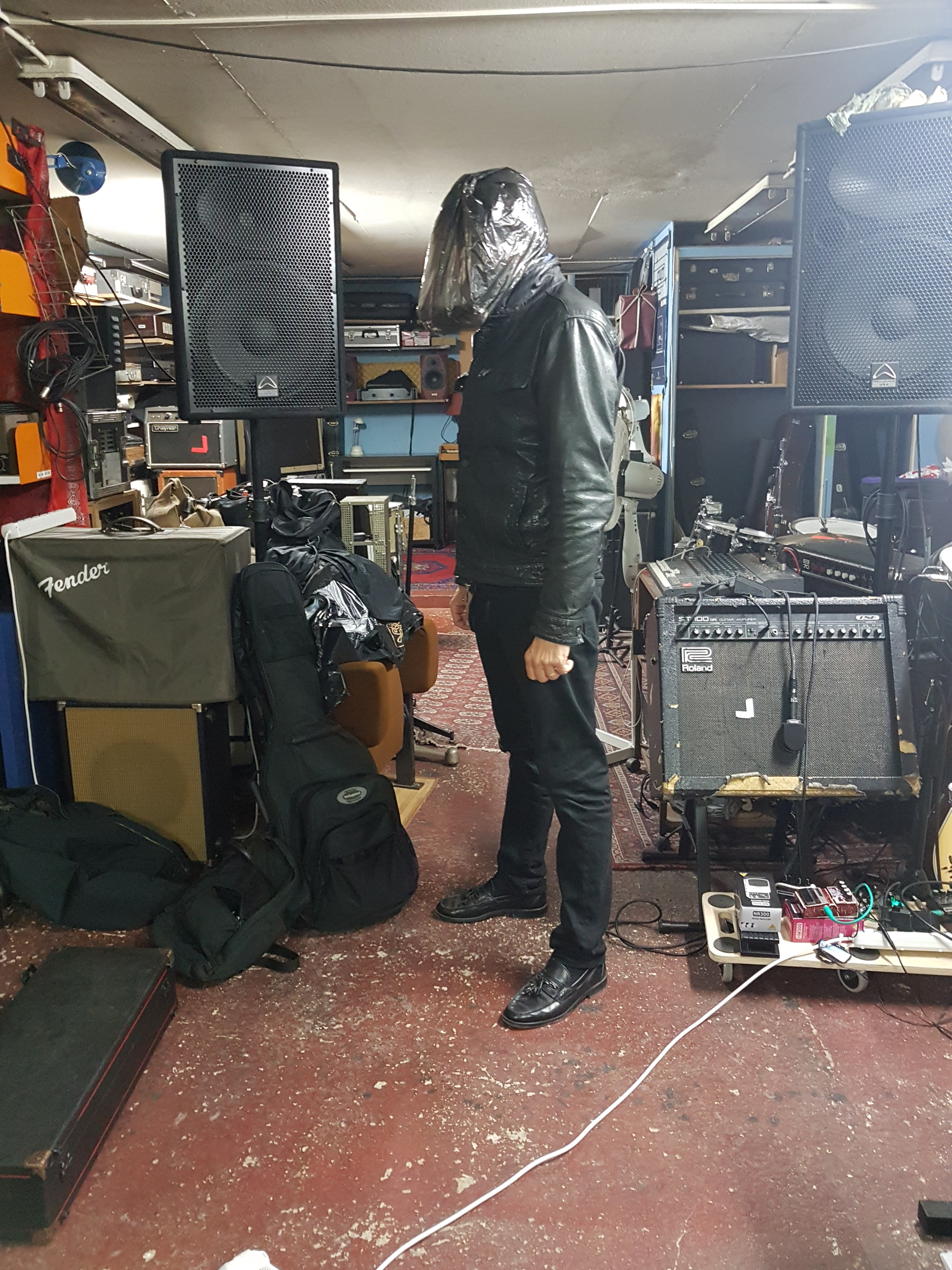
Vomir wearing the signature plastic bag over his head.

Although HNW remains an underground sub-genre of noise music, several events are dedicated to the genre as well as a festival. Instants Chavirés in Montreuil is one prominent hotspot for the genre and fans.

The performances of Vomir are described as "anti-concerts". His live show typically lasts from at least 1 hour to a maximum of 8 hours.

Plastic bags were offered to audience at the start of Vomir performances and were accompanied by a note: "Do not hesitate to place the plastic bag on your head for a complete immersion in the sound of Harsh Noise Wall, for separate yourself [sic] from everything else except noise". In 2022, Vomir stated that for safety concerns, he would longer wear or provide plastic bags. He now wears a leather bag over his head while performing, and he urges audience members to bring their own bags. The plastic bag is an accessory used to question the audience about its relationship to consumption and finds a certain echo with the stage name Vomir.

== Collaboration ==
Perrot has taken part in numerous recordings with artists such as Marc Hurtado, Rotted Brain, Écoute la Merde, Werewolf Jerusalem, Government Alpha, Mama Baer, Kommissar Hjuler, Torturing Nurse.

=== Roro Perrot: designer of Folk à Chier ===
He has been known as Roro Perrot since 2011. With this training, he initiated a musical experiment and founded the concept of "Folk à chier".

In the spirit of Jean Dubuffet's sound experiments, and more broadly, of his theory of outsider art, and the rejection of a dominant culture developed in Asphyxiant culture, Romain Perrot "practices an ersatz folk, improvised, ramshackle, inarticulate ”which he also describes on his label's website as“ a raw acoustic punk: without agreement, without musical knowledge, raw vocals, despair and rage."

These are instrumental productions, with an acoustic or electric guitar, on which he puts his voice.

His first record was released on the Premier Sang label in September 2011.

Under this training, Romain Perrot does not impose any defined perimeter, unlike his practice of Harsh Noise Wall, for which he respects the line of conduct he enacted through his Manifesto. Thus, he enjoys an eccentric freedom in the use of his instruments and his voice to create noise, allowing him to tackle a more Dadaist experiment.

He participates again with Roro Perrot in several collaborative projects. In particular with Yves Botz, for an acoustic duo which gave birth to recordings and performances for which they present themselves in a few words: "Instinct, urgency, humor, noise. The four hands of these two magnificent idiots do it all". He also invites "a friend who sings like a pan", following the common thread of his practice.

=== Other ventures ===
Perrot is an outsider musician who works outside all musical constraints. Since his debut as a solo noise guitarist under the name Under Your Come Hand, he has set up numerous groups and projects under different pseudonyms: Romprai Etron, Falot, Ennui, Free as Dead.

The Trou aux Rats project that he leads to keyboards and synthesizers allows him to consolidate his uniqueness and to perform in Tokyo in 2018.

== Noise music theorist ==
Perrot, who continually explores new repertoires in parallel with his musical practice, has developed a broad knowledge of noise music. He is a privileged interlocutor to address themes related to noise, its listening and its aesthetics. Through his participation in several cycles of conferences and university research, he leads a theoretical reflection around the aesthetic influence generated by noise music on experimental music.

In 2014, he participated in the international conference "Bruit" organized by the ACTE Institute (Sorbonne Paris 1 & CNRS) and by the ENS Louis-Lumière, in partnership with INA and Volume!

In 2017, he was invited by University College Cork to contribute to Paul Hegarty's research seminar "The absence of nothing sounds: Blanchot and the Performance of Harsh Noise Wall."

In 2018, his works are exhibited at the University of Paris 8, as part of the exhibition "The constraints of the place". He also takes part in a conference cycle for the “Journée d'études Physique(s) du son” organized by the Espaces Sonores research group of the Rhine University of the Arts.

We find him during the conference "Audible spectra. Sound studies, listening cultures and sound arts" at INHA in collaboration with the Philharmonie de Paris and in connection with the international conference "Sensing the sonic: Histories of hearing differently (1800 -Now)" at the Center for research in the arts, social sciences and humanities (CRASSH).

Perrot publishes a limited edition graphic fanzine named Absurdum.
