= Noisecore =

Extreme subgenre of hardcore punk

- Stylistic origins: Hardcore punk; grindcore; noise rock; noise; industrial
- Cultural origins: Mid-1980s
- Typical instruments: Vocals, guitar, bass, drums, electronics, effects

Fusion genres
- Noisegrind; gorenoise

Other topics
- Japanoise; noise rock; harsh noise; industrial rock; metalcore; thrashcore

Noisecore is a fusion genre that merges hardcore punk and noise rock. Originally emerging in the mid-1980s, the genre is characterized by chaotic song structures, short track lengths, unintelligible lyrics, heavy guitar feedback and distortion, blast beats, noise-laden soundscapes, as well as a rejection of musical theory.

Notable acts include Melt-Banana, Gore Beyond Necropsy, Fat Day and the Gerogerigegege.

== Characteristics ==
Noisecore is characterized by a rejection of conventional song structures such as verse and choruses, embodying a lo-fi aesthetic, accompanied by extremely fast and erratic drumming, often dominated by blast beats, alongside heavily distorted guitars, which incorporate feedback and noise.

== History ==
Noisecore emerged in the mid-1980s as a fringe development of the hardcore and early thrashcore scenes. Pioneers of noisecore include bands such as Meat Shits, who introduced growling and blast beats to the genre, Deche-Charge, and Seven Minutes of Nausea, who released Does Abstinence Kills in 1986 and later a split with Seth Putnam's Anal Cunt in 1989. Subsequently, Anal Cunt and Fear of God later pioneered, noisegrind, a more grindcore-oriented noisecore derivative genre.

== Legacy ==
Noisecore has been influential to later experimental music scenes and movements, with the Guardian describing the work of Shayne Oliver, as "a mix of dark noisecore, grungy sounds, bolshie hip-hop and dancefloor-ready tracks". While underground and alternative music websites like Vice and Pitchfork have used the term numerous times on several reviews and articles.

Additionally, before the term "mathcore" was coined, mainly in the 1990s, the style had been referred to as "chaotic hardcore" or "noisecore".

=== Gorenoise ===
Gorenoise is an offshoot of goregrind and noisecore that abandons rock-based sounds for harsh noise. New Noise Magazine characterized the genre as drum machines "hammer[ing] at 1,000 BPM over top of gurgling pitch-shifted toilet vocals". Album cover art often incorporates graphic crime scene photos and depictions of entrails. The band Anal Birth is credited as one of the progenitors of gorenoise. Other projects noted for producing gorenoise are Elephant Man Behind the Sun, the early work of Torture, Meekness, and Melanocytic Tumors of Uncertain Malignant Potential.

== See also ==
- Harsh noise
- Japanoise
