= Astro (Japanese band) =

Japanese musical duo

- Origin: Japan
- Genres: Noise
- Years active: 1993––present
- Spinoff of: C.C.C.C.
- Members: Hiroshi Hasegawa; Rohco

Astro is a Japanese noise group, originally started in 1993 as a solo project of Hiroshi Hasegawa (長谷川洋, Hasegawa Hiroshi) of the group C.C.C.C. Hiroshi Hasegawa uses assorted analog equipment including vintage Moog and EMS synthesizers. His music covers a wide range of styles in the noise field, from space music to psychedelically-tinged harsh noise. Since 2013, Astro has been a duo of Hiroshi Hasegawa and Rohco (Hiroko Hasegawa), who has played with Astro since 2009.
