= Moenai Hai =

Studio album by the Gerogerigegege
- Released: April 20, 2016
- Recorded: 2014–2015
- Genres: Dark ambient, musique concrète, drone, noise rock, shoegaze, harsh noise
- Length: 53:28
- Label: Eskimo
- Producer: Juntaro Yamanouchi

The Gerogerigegege chronology
Saturdaynight Big Cock Salaryman (2001)	Moenai Hai (2016)	Uguisudani Apocalypse (2019)

Moenai Hai (Japanese: 燃えない灰) is a studio album by Japanese experimental band the Gerogerigegege, released in 2016. It was the band's first release since the 2001 Saturdaynight Big Cock Salaryman EP.

== Production ==
The album was recorded between 2014 and 2015, though not entirely written during this period; the second track, "ゲロゲリゲゲゲ / The Gerogerigegege", is a rerecording of a piece that previously appeared in the 1986 release The Gero-P as "We Got Normal".

Unlike many of the band's previous records, Moenai Hai is less focused on noise and is mostly made up of ambient music and "treasure/trash" recordings, as Juntaro Yamanouchi refers to in the liner notes, also specifying that they are "not field recording".

== Release ==
The album was released after a long period of silence from the band since their previous release in 2001, while their last full-length album before Moenai Hai, Hell Driver, came out in 1999.

Little was known regarding the status of the band during this time. Rumors circulated about the whereabouts of Yamanouchi and Gero 30, the only other consistent member. In a supposed interview Yamanouchi gave in 2001, he said that Gero 30 "had been in a hospital for a very long time".

Gero 30's current conditions are still unknown; no Gerogerigegege release containing new material since Saturdaynight Big Cock Salaryman lists him in the credits or liner notes as a contributor.

== Reception ==
Moenai Hai received two reviews from different staff members of Sputnikmusic. One rated it 3.3/5, describing it as "a compelling reflection of Juntaro Yamanouchi’s absence", and as the band "trying for an uncertain audience, with an uncertain message, for uncertain response, and no recourse". The other review, published several months later, described it in comparison to their earlier work as "still uncompromising", while noting the lack of the humour that had previously characterized the project. It described it as "a testament to resilience, and the plummeting depths of misery", rating it 3.5/5. Heathen Harvest described it as an album that "goes beyond music; hell, it goes beyond everything". French webzine XSilence.net described Juntaro Yamanouchi's period of inactivity as "not in vain", and described Moenai Hai as an "artistic metamorphosis", rating it 17/20.

== Track listing ==
No.	Title	Length
1.	"西河の果て / Out of Saiga"	7:57
2.	"ゲロゲリゲゲゲ / The Gerogerigegege"	15:20
3.	"敗残兵士達の海 / Tokyo〜Sea of Losers/Donors for USA"	22:06
4.	"最期の調律 / Final Tuning"	8:05
Total length:		53:28

== Personnel ==
- Juntaro Yamanouchi – composer, producer, cover design, photography, recording (all except track 2), editor, treasure/trash recording, all guitars (track 2), bass (track 2), piano (track 3), guitar tuner (track 3)
- Dr. Euro – drums (track 2)
- Toshihisa Hirano – recording (track 2)
- Soichiro Nakamura – mastering
- Uta Nishida – hand written text
- Shinichiro Kuwashima – artwork
