= Reagan Speaks For Himself =

1980 audio artwork by Douglas Kahn

Reagan Speaks For Himself is an audio artwork created by Douglas Kahn. First composed in 1980 using a razor blade and reel-to-reel tape recorder, the work is a satirical cut-up reworking of a 1979 interview between Former Governor of California Ronald Reagan and the American journalist Bill Moyers. Regular airplay on college and independent radio stations during the period saw the piece gain popularity and enduring influence, marking what the artist Jon Leidecker (AKA Wobbly) has labelled as "many people's first exposure to culture jamming."

== History ==
Kahn's turn towards sound and tape recorders as medium for art making came while he was an MFA student at CalArts in the 1970s. Early pieces drew upon radio and cut-up sources, eventually leading to humorous experiments involving stammering and repetitious phrases drawn from the mouths of others. An early precursor to Reagan Speaks Himself saw Kahn draw upon an interview with President Gerald Ford in which he argues that in order to "expand the economy, you have to stimulate the private sector."

== Publication ==
Reagan Speaks For Himself was first published on Sub Pop's fifth compilation cassette in 1981. Kahn duplicated copies of his work and sold them at an inflated price to partially fund the distribution of free copies of the work to community and college radio stations throughout the United States, leading it to become a hit on underground radio at the time. The work was also "performed" at poetry readings and art talks in Seattle, with one taking place alongside comics artist Lynda Barry and her poodle named "Mohawk."

After Reagan was sworn in as President later that year, Kahn amended the introduction of the piece, from "I want to say I'm President. I want to live in the White House!" to "For the first time in Man's history, I uhhh, I'm President!" This second version of the work was included as a flexidisc in the fourth issue of Art Speigelman's Raw comix anthology after the underground comix artist Spain Rodriguez encourage Kahn to submit the work. The magazine initially ran into trouble with the production of the disc, after the Florida-based manufacturers Eva-Tone Soundsheets Inc. refused to press the work after they deemed the tape "morally objectionable," recommending that the editors of Raw contact the President's "agent" in order to attain the written permission of Reagan. The disc was eventually pressed in the Netherlands and was accompanied in the magazine by a full page illustration by the British artist Sue Coe of Reagan as a cashed up pig harbouring a klansman.

The work later featured in an audio supplement to a 1982 issue of NME (attributed to Ronald Reagan under the title of "Doug Kahn Asks The Tough Questions") and on the Si Kahn's (no relation) 1982 folk compilation, Reaganomics Blues. Following Reagan's death in 2004, the work again returned to the playlists of a number of college and community radio stations throughout the US.

== Samples ==
Reagan Speaks For Himself has been notably sampled by production duo Coldcut on their 'Seven Minutes of Madness' remix of Eric B. & Rakim's 1987 single, "Paid In Full". The work was also sampled by the British group Fine Young Cannibals on the dance mix of their 1985 single "Johnny Come Home". According to Kahn in and interview with Craig Baldwin for his film Sonic Outlaws, he was fine with people reusing his own collage work but had a problem with the way that the British group trivialised the politics behind the work and failed to pass on any royalties (or even a copy of the record) to Kahn.
