= GX Jupitter-Larsen =

American interdisciplinary artist

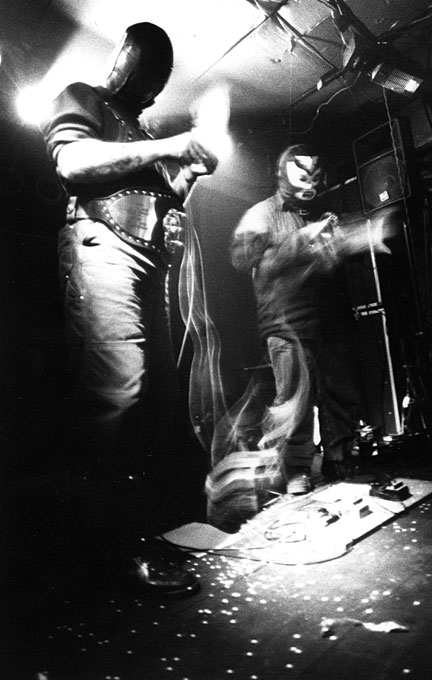
- Jupitter-Larsen performing in 1999
- Born: Gerald Xe Jupitter-Larsen; March 2, 1959 (age 67)
- Known for: Sound, Interdisciplinary

GX Jupitter-Larsen (sometimes erroneously spelled Juppiter-Larsen) is an artist, based in Hollywood, California, who has been active in a number of underground art scenes since the late 1970s. Jupitter-Larsen has been involved in punk rock, mail art, cassette culture, the noise music scene, and zine culture. During the 1990s he was the sound designer for the performances of Mark Pauline's Survival Research Laboratories. He is the founder and sole permanent member of the noise act The Haters, who have performed all over the world, and appeared on over 300 CD and record releases.

== As a conceptual artist ==
Larsen's music focuses on themes of entropy and decay, professional wrestling, and personalized units of measurement such as polywave, the totimorphous, and the xylowave. In 1985, Jupitter-Larsen invented his own number system.

== As a performance artist ==
In an article entitled "30 Years of the Haters" which appears in the premiere issue of the magazine As Loud as Possible a number of early performances by Jupitter-Larsen are listed. In most of these performances, enacted during the 1980s and 90s, whole audiences were led by inside agitators to actually ruin or destroy the venues that the performances were taking place. However a number of Jupitter-Larsen performance art events that are mentioned in numerous issues of the 1980s mail art zine KS are often non-confrontational projects. Such as the artist counting garbage cans while walking down a street by himself. His latest performance piece entitled "Loud Luggage / Booming Baggage", first performed in 2010, has The Haters operating amplified suitcases, shaking and banging them about till the luggage eventually breaks.

== As a video artist & filmmaker ==
From 1982 to 1986, he submitted a black video tape entitled Blank Banner to over forty video festivals. It was screened in nine. In 1994, using an all female cast, Jupitter-Larsen produced a short lesbian vampire film entitled "Holes On The Neck". The film's narrative is of a group of vampires who work and play on their garlic farm. Their human lovers desire to become vampires themselves, and so lure these garlic farmers into initiating them. In 2013, Jupitter-Larsen's first feature-length movie entitled "A Noisy Delivery" premiered in Leeds England and New York City. The movie is about people who go to the post office for philosophy instead of postage.

== As a writer ==
There are three published novels written by Jupitter-Larsen. Raw Zed and The Condor was published by Blood Print Press in 1992. Sometimes Never and Adventure on The High Seas were both published in 2009 by Crossing Chaos. These novels are without chapters. Instead, Jupitter-larsen uses passages of random letters to represent nothingness, sections of entirely self-invented words to represent the spiritual, and regular words to represent the physical. A book of French translations of his essays and short fiction, entitled Saccages has also been published by the Lausanne Underground Film & Music Festival and Rip on/off. Vincent Barras, who has translated John Cage's Silence into French, wrote one of the book's introductions.

== See also ==
- The Haters
- Noise music
- Mail art
- Anti-art
