= Douglas Kahn =

American-born Australian sound artist

Douglas Kahn (born 1951 in Bremerton, Washington, USA) is acclaimed for his historical and theoretical writings on the use of sound in the avant-garde experimental arts, noise music and the history and theory of media art. His writings have been influential in the scholarly area of sound studies and the practical area of sound art. He was a former editor of Leonardo Music Journal and has written in The Wire, The Guardian, October (magazine), Art & Text, InterCommunication, Music Today Biannual, Musicworks, Parachute, Performing Arts Journal and Experimental Musical Instruments; among others, and in the books Critical Issues in Electronic Media, Radio Rethink, In the Spirit of Fluxus and Sound by Artists. He lives in Katoomba, New South Wales, Australia.

== Academic background ==
Kahn was born and raised in Bremerton, Washington. He was in the first class of The Evergreen State College and graduated with a bachelor's degree; obtained a master's degree in ethnomusicology from Wesleyan University, where he studied with Alvin Lucier and Ron Kuivila; a Master of Fine Arts in Post-studio Arts at California Institute of the Arts where he studied with David Antin, Vito Acconci, John Baldessari, Yvonne Rainer, and James Tenney, and a PhD in art history and theory from University of Western Sydney under supervision of Helen Grace.

== Artistic background ==
Kahn created the audiotape cut-up Reagan Speaks For Himself in 1980 using an interview conducted by Bill Moyers of Ronald Reagan when he was still a candidate for president. The first version was published on a Sub Pop audio cassette and the second version was published on a flexidisc in RAW magazine. The audiotape was used in a dance mix by the Fine Young Cannibals and sampled by Eric B. & Rakim in their song "Paid in Full (Coldcut Mix)". Kahn appears in the 1995 film Sonic Outlaws by San Francisco filmmaker Craig Baldwin.

== Academic career ==
Kahn is Honorary Professor at Sydney College of the Arts, University of Sydney, Professor Emeritus at University of New South Wales, Australia, and professor emeritus at University of California, Davis, where he was the Founding Director of Technocultural Studies. He was a recipient of an Australian Research Council Future Fellowship from 2012 to 2016 and a Guggenheim Fellowship in 2006.

== Book publications ==
- His book John Heartfield: Art and Mass Media was published by Tanam Press in 1985.
- He is editor (with Diane Neumaier) of Cultures in Contention published by Real Comet Press in 1985.
- He was editor (with Gregory Whitehead) of Wireless Imagination: Sound, Radio, and the Avant-garde published by MIT Press in 1992.
- Kahn's best known book is Noise, Water, Meat: A History of Sound in the Arts, published by MIT Press in 1999. The Times Literary Supplement called the book "an impressive combination of solid academic research and theoretical pyrotechnics."
- His book Earth Sound Earth Signal: Energies and Earth Magnitude in the Arts was published in 2013 by University of California Press. Support was provided by a Guggenheim Fellowship to investigate the history of naturally occurring electromagnetism in telecommunications, science and the arts, and by a 2008 Arts Writers Grant from Creative Capital and the Warhol Foundation. Slate and Public Books listed Earth Sound Earth Signal as one of the books of the year.
- His book Energies in the Arts, an edited collection published by MIT Press in 2019, argues for a pluralist notion of the concept of energy to inform research in the humanities inclusive of and beyond the dominant associations of energy with fossil fuel use and physics. MIT Press summarized the book as, "Investigating the concepts and material realities of energy coursing through the arts: a foundational text." He proposed the term "ecopath" in relation to psychopath and sociopath in his essay "What is an Ecopath?" published by Sydney Review of Books.
- With composer and founding editor Larry Austin, Kahn edited Source: Music of the Avant-garde, a collection of material drawn from the original Source: Music of the Avant Garde magazine series.
- With art historian Hannah Higgins, he co-edited an anthology of computer art (1960–1970) called Mainframe Experimentalism: Early Computing and the Foundations of Digital Art, published in 2012 by University of California Press.
