= Diesel Guitar =

Japanese music project

Diesel Guitar (ディーゼル・ギター) is the solo noise music project of Youki Noseyama (能勢山 陽生, Noseyama Youki) (born 1967), who runs the independent noise label Good Microphone. The project originated as a duo called "Deisel Guitars".

His first CD, called Stream of Lights, was released in 2002. It features material recorded between 10/1998 and 6/2001. Tracks 1 through 4 are recorded live and tracks 5 and 6 are recorded in the studio. Noseyama uses reverb, analog effects and Morley Pedals.

== Discography ==
As Diesel Guitar

- Nacht und Nebel (1994, 7")
- Maria (1995, cassette)
- Medium of Lights (1996, cassette)
- Stream of Lights (2002, CD)
- Resonance 2003-2010 (2011, CD)
- Maria / Medium of Lights / Assimilation (2017, 3CD compilation)

As Youki Noseyama

- Kaze no Utsuwa (風の器) (2012, CD)
- Matter and Life (2017, LP)

As Deisel Guitars

- Materialism Rock (1992, cassette)
- Atom (1993, cassette)
- Double Minds String (split with Sian) (1994, cassette)

== See also ==
- List of Japanoise artists
