= Crack Fierce =

- Also known as: Flim Flam
- Born: Hideki Kato
- Origin: Hamura, Tokyo
- Genres: Noise music
- Instruments: Effects units, electronics, objects
- Years active: 1996–present
- Label: United Syndicate

Hideki Kato, better known under the stage name Crack Fierce, is a Japanese noise musician. He started Crack Fierce in the spring of 1996, and also runs the label United Syndicate. He has also built effects units.

Note: He is not the same as Kato Hideki, who plays bass in Ground Zero.

== Discography ==
=== As Crack Fierce ===
- Vagina Starving (1996 United Syndicate)
- Smack My Crack (199? Self Abuse)
- Felony Noise (1997 Lazy Squid)
- Illegal Collage & Feedback (1998 Robotomy)
- Full Metal Confused (1998 Solipsism)
- Perspicacious Variance (1999 Spite)
- Red Flag (2008 Noise Ninja)
- Heterogenious Infusion (split with Mlehst) (1997 United Syndicate)
- "Pain Circulation" (split with Kazumoto Endo) (1997 United Syndicate)
- "Crowded Noise" (split with Armenia) (1997 Bizarre Audio Arts / United Syndicate)
- untitled (split with Third Organ) (1999 United Syndicate)

=== As C-Fat ===
with Two Assistant Deputy Ministers

- untitled (2004 United Syndicate)
- Kennel Club (2004 United Syndicate)

=== As Flip Flop ===
- Interior A Priori Estimate (200? United Syndicate)

=== As Melting Plastic Head Core ===
with Mo*Te

- My Sweet Memory (1998 Uncut)
