= Wapstan =

- Also known as: Wapstan, Foutredieu!!!, Grand Nord
- Born: Martin Sasseville; 1980 (age 45–46)
- Origin: Montreal, Quebec, Canada
- Genres: Experimental, noise, dark ambient, Drone
- Instruments: Magnetic tape, synthesizer, effect pedal, theremin
- Years active: 2002–present
- Labels: Brise-Cul, Chondritic Sound, Nurse Etiquette, INYRDISK, Knife In The Toaster, Pasalymany among many others
- Website: kvlt667.com

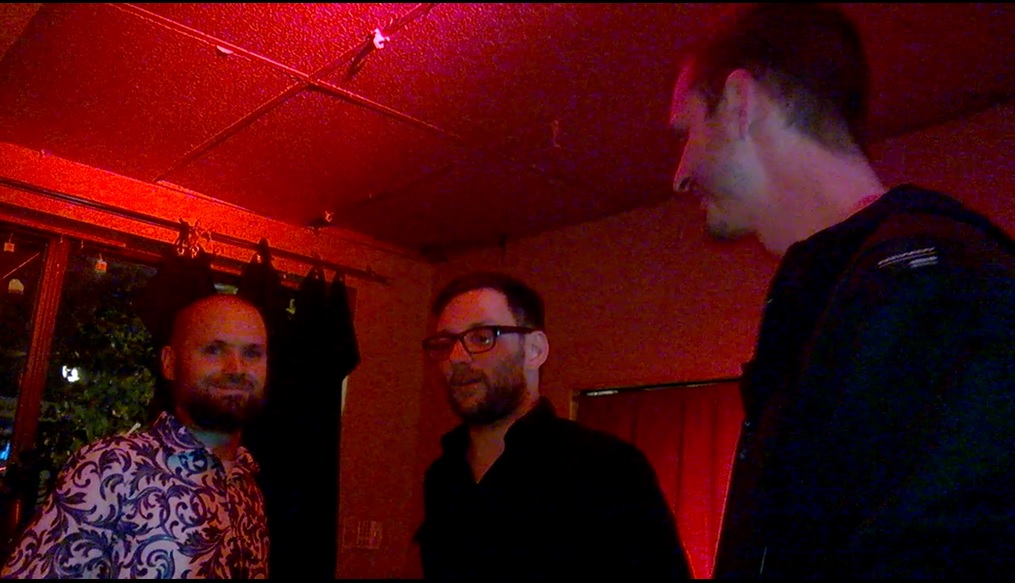
Wapstan photographed at Brasserie Beaubien in Montreal, Quebec

Wapstan (misspelling of the cree word Wapistan meaning 'Marten') is the name of the main musical project of Canadian noise musician Martin Sasseville (born 1980) based in Montreal, Quebec. Originally formed in Saguenay as a project to create experimental sounds influenced by the experience of coldness, Wapstan based most of his sounds as a tribute of the north. The Wapstan sound is often self-described as "hypothermic drones". Wapstan's sound was originally constructed as a vitalist ambiance opposed to the general pessimism of the noise scene. Since its moving to Montreal in 2003, Wapstan started performing live and has performed many shows in Montreal as well as New England and central Canada.

Most Wapstan releases are on its own record label Brise-Cul Records under the CD-R format. The record label is also mainly focused on releasing similar-sounding artists as well as many Montreal artists such as Kvik, Grkzgl, Gmackrr, Midwifery, Les Temps Liquides, Monday Morning Erection, Dead Bush and many others.

== Partial discography ==
- L’ivresse et le froid (Brise-Cul, 2004)
- L’appel du Vent (Audiobot, 2005)
- Trompe la mort (X Died En Route Y, 2005)
- Waiting For Winter (Brise-Cul, 2005)
- Vingt-Cinq (Brise-Cul, Québec, 2005)
- Transcending Hypothermia (Brise-Cul, 2006)
- Hans Island (Knife In The Toaster, 2006)
- Il Fait Froid, Je Sais Que C’est Froid (Nurse Etiquette, 2006)
- Of Zero And The Void (Run Down Sun, 2006)
- Thunder On The Tundra(Landscape Sounds to Scare Gods) (Pasalymany Tapes, 2006)
- Wolfuck (Brise-Cul, 2007)
- Saturnales (INYRDISK, 2007)
- The Gallery (Brise-Cul, 2007)
- Distant Thunder (Chondritic Sounds, 2008)
- Stoneham (Brise-Cul, 2010)
- Monolith Thunder (Brise-Cul, 2010)
- Winter is War (Brise-Cul, 2010)
- Old Age (Brise-Cul, 2010)

Wapstan also have done split with many underground artists such as Envenomist, Pon De Replay, Grkzgl, Kapali Carsi, Rei Rea, Robe., Seplophobia, Never Presence Forever, Crotch, Hebeeb...
