= Harsh noise =

Subgenre of noise music

- Stylistic origins: Kansai no wave; noise; Japanoise; industrial; power electronics
- Cultural origins: 1980s; Japan, Europe and United States

Subgenres
- Harsh noise wall

Fusion genres
- Gorenoise

Other topics
- Noise rock

Harsh noise is a subgenre of noise music that emerged in the early 1980s, originating from the Kansai no wave movement and later Japanoise, primarily through acts such as Merzbow, Hijokaidan, Hanatarash, C.C.C.C. and Incapacitants, and was further developed by the European power electronics scene and American noise musicians such as the Haters, Daniel Menche, and Richard Ramirez.

== Characteristics ==
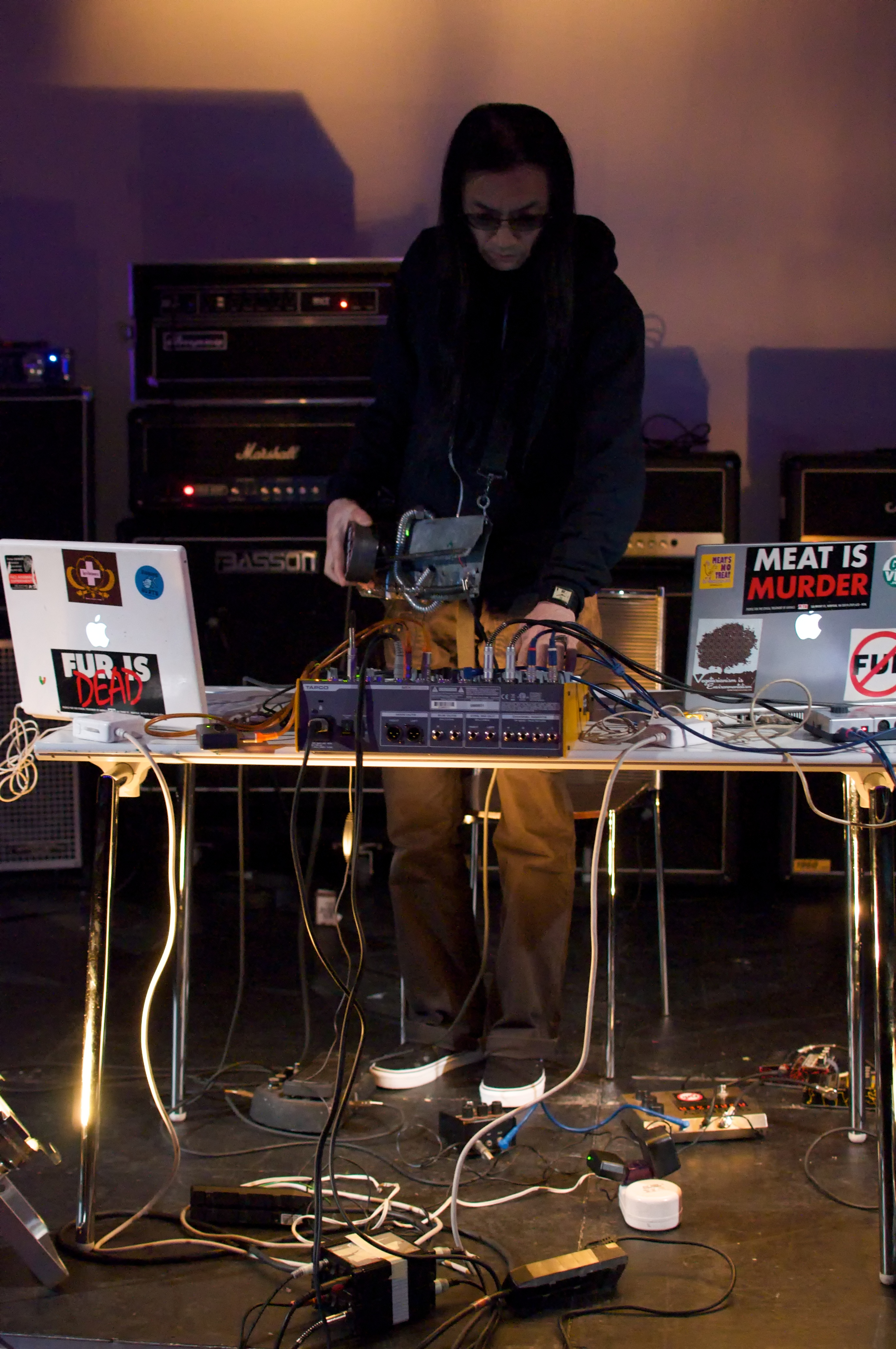
Merzbow is considered to be one of the most popular harsh noise artists

Harsh noise is an extreme subgenre of noise music characterized by its rejection of music theory and traditional song structure, with little or no conventional melody, rhythm, or harmony. Artists typically employ effects pedals, synthesizers, manipulated recordings, or custom-built electronics to generate distortion and feedback, resulting in compositions of dense static, electronic screeches, and abrasive sonic bursts. Performances often incorporate improvisation, and the style is frequently described as inaccessible and lacking commercial appeal. Harsh noise is primarily associated with underground music, with regional scenes emerging internationally in Japan, England, Canada, Indonesia and America.

== History ==
=== 1980s–1990s: Origins ===
During the 1980s and 1990s, harsh noise music originally emerged in Japan through the Japanoise scene, which grew out of the Kansai no wave movement. Early Japanese noise acts such as Merzbow, Hijokaidan, Hanatarash, C.C.C.C. and Incapacitants would prove influential in establishing the sound of harsh noise.

Around the same time, European power electronics, a subgenre of industrial music, became an important influence on the development of harsh noise, with the style later being popularized in the United States by American noise musicians such as the Haters, Daniel Menche, and Richard Ramirez.

== Related genres ==
=== Harsh noise wall ===
Harsh noise wall
- Stylistic origins: Harsh noise
- Cultural origins: 1990s; United States, Japan, France

Other topics
- Japanoise

Harsh noise wall (also known as wall noise, noise wall, or HNW) is a subgenre of harsh noise that emerged in the 1990s. originally pioneered by artists such as Richard Ramirez, Skin Crime, Robot 3000, the Rita and Vomir. Music journalist Russell Williams described the genre as "a literal consistent, unflinching and enveloping wall of monolithic noise".

Harsh noise wall features noises layered together to form a loud, distorted, brickwalled static sound. French harsh noise artist Vomir described the genre as "no ideas, no change, no development, no entertainment, no remorse". Harsh noise wall musician Sam McKinlay, also known as The Rita, considered the genre as "the purification of the Japanese harsh noise scene into a more refined crunch, which crystallizes the tonal qualities of distortion in a slow moving minimalistic texture."

=== Gorenoise ===
Gorenoise is an offshoot of goregrind and noisecore that abandons rock-based sounds for harsh noise. New Noise Magazine characterized the genre as drum machines "hammer[ing] at 1,000 BPM over top of gurgling pitch-shifted toilet vocals". Album cover art often incorporates graphic crime scene photos and depictions of entrails. The band Anal Birth is credited as one of the progenitors of gorenoise. Other projects noted for producing gorenoise are Elephant Man Behind the Sun, the early work of Torture, Meekness, and Melanocytic Tumors of Uncertain Malignant Potential.

== See also ==
- Post-noise
- Avant-garde music
