= Noise, Water, Meat: A History of Sound In The Arts =

1999 book by Douglas Kahn

Noise, Water, Meat: A History of Sound in the Arts is a book by historian and theorist Douglas Kahn. First published in 1999, the book charts a history of sound in the arts through the arc of modernism, the avant-garde, late-modernism, the experimentalism of John Cage, the work of the generation following him including artists such as Allan Kaprow, George Brecht, and Yoko Ono, as well as writers William S. Burroughs and Michael McLure, and filmmakers Dziga Vertov, Sergei Eisenstein and Grigori Alexandrov. In doing so, Kahn uses the book to call for a form of historiographic listening that through which a new understanding of cultural history and theory can be drawn.

== Background ==
Noise, Water, Meat draws upon some of Kahn's prior writing, including articles for October and The Musical Quarterly, and book chapters in Wireless Imagination: Sound, Radio and the Avant-Garde (MIT Press, 1992), In the Spirit of Fluxus (ed. Elizabeth Armstrong and Joan Rothfuss, Walker Art Center, 1993), and his PhD dissertation "Techniques and Tropes of Sound, Voice and Aurality in Artistic Modernism" (supervised by Dr. Helen Grace). According to Kahn, the book was composed during stints on Sydney commuter trains using readily available material and his own personal collection.

== Significant themes ==
=== Sound in the Arts ===
While Noise, Water, Meat addresses the use of sound by artists, it is not a history of the field of contemporary art known as sound art. According to Kahn, the category of Sound Art came to prominence within the United States during the 1990s and 2000s largely in the wake of Dan Lander's edited collection, Sound By Artists. Artists outside the art-market centre of New York had long been developing techniques, practices, and works that would be considered within the space of sound art well before the boom of the category around the turn of the new millennium.

The subtitle of the book therefore marked an important distinction between Kahn's work and artistic category that emerged during the later half of the 20th century. As Kahn later noted, his use of the word "art" is here more generalised, referring to the broad sweep of the synthetic arts, encompassing, "the various intersecting social, cultural, and environmental realities wittingly and unwittingly embodied in any one of the innumerable factors that go into producing, experiencing, and understanding a particular work."

=== Noise ===
The book breaks down the demarcation between what was considered sound and musical sound within European art music and Euro-American Modernism. What used to be understood as "non-musical sound" was otherwise recognised as noise, but Kahn argues that modernist and avant-garde artists recuperated this category by rhetorically and practically invoking the totality of all sound associated with the capacities of audiographic technologies.

This recuperation first takes form within Italian futurist Luigi Russolo's manifesto and book, The Art of Noises, where "noise" refers to an expanded pallet of timbre.

However, in Kahn's telling it was John Cage who took this recuperation of sounds to its logical conclusion in his writings and with his composition, 4'33". In the piece, sounds are transformed into music just through the act of listening. In a close examination of Cage's understanding of "sound," Kahn argues that the previous demarcation between significant sounds and significant noises remained within the composer's work. Rather, Kahn recognises that Cage's notions of all sound and always sound were part of a larger tradition of the impossible inaudible; that is, the idea that sound either does not dissipate, is both indelibly inscribed and still moving, or is continuous and ubiquitous in a subatomic movement.

== Reception ==
Noise, Water, Meat not only introduced up sound in the arts as a field of study, but has also been recognised as a pioneering text in the field of sound studies.

Writer and artist Seth Kim-Cohen describes Noise, Water, Meat as a "deeply informed, idiosyncratic, and at times visionary account of the incursions of the aural into the visual and literary arts from the turn of the twentieth century through the 1960s."

Philosopher Christopher Cox praised the book as a "magisterial account" of the context out of which sound art emerged. He highlights "Kahn’s theoretical sophistication, however, is extraordinarily rare among critics and theorists of the audio arts whose tools are generally restricted to physical and phenomenological description."

In one review, David Williams praised the book as "one of the most stimulating and provocative studies of art practices and discourses in social contexts I have read for many years."
