= Chop Shop (musician) =

Noise musician Scott Konzelmann

Chop Shop a.k.a. Scott Konzelmann, is a noise musician who has released recordings on Pure, RRRecords, Banned Production, V2_Archief and Generator Sound Art.

Chop Shop creates sound using salvaged materials and speakers to create drones and other sounds specific to the speaker created. Often the speaker features prominently in the packaging as a photo or daguerreotype. Chop Shop is known also for innovative packaging using leather, tar paper, steel plates, etc.

Konzelmann is also part of Generator Sound Art, Inc. in New York City. In 2005, Chop Shop was part of the Activating the Medium Festival.

== Discography (selection) ==
- Steelplate – 1991 (2 10" EPs bound to 10" square plate of steel) RRRecords.
- Tension Charge Discharge – 1994 (3" CD in metal mesh package) V2_Archief.
- Plays Emil Beaulieau – Red & Buried (5" CD) Pure.
- Smolder – 1998 (3" CD on copper plate wrapped in lead) V2_Archief.
- Discrete Emission (7" record in riveted tar paper (or limited sewn leather) sleeve—one side plays "in," one "out") Banned Production.
- Powerdrunk (5" CD in tar paper sleeve) Banned Production.
- Rusty Hum (3" CD) Banned Production.
- Hello (business card-size CD) Banned Production.
- Kaput (3" CD "packaged in a gauze wrap surgical taped to a sheet of cracked safety glass.") Generator Sound Art.
- Perpetual Tension (Concert for Speaker Constructions) – Live performance April 29, 1994 at Roulette, NYC (5" CDR) Generator Sound Art.
- Breakthrough (5" CDR – "A repackaged edition of the limited 1992 cassette release of the Orgonon field recordings") Generator Sound Art.
- Oxide (5" CD) 23five – 2008
