= Morphogenesis (band) =

British experimental music group

Morphogenesis is a British experimental music group specializing in improvised noise music and the use of unconventional instruments and sound-making devices.

Founded in 1985, the group usually was composed of ex-Scratch Orchestra member Roger Sutherland (also the author of New Perspectives In Music, London: Sun Tavern Fields. ISBN 0-9517012-6-6), Adam Bohman (a member of C.I.M., Conspiracy, and many other improvising groups), Ron Briefel, Clive Hall, Fred Sansom, and sometime Organum cohort Michael Prime, who has developed techniques of using the bioelectrical fields of plants to create music. Occasional Nurse with Wound collaborator Clive Graham replaced Fred Sansom in 1989. Andy Cordery was with the band for 2 years in the early 1990s.

Often using extended technique, "prepared" instruments or ordinary objects, most of the members also use live electronics to process their sounds in real time. Their unusual sound is difficult to categorise, drawing a small but enthusiastic following, leading to features in The Wire, Resonance (which later grew into the Resonance FM radio station) and jazz magazine EST. One admirer is Thurston Moore, who invited the group to support Sonic Youth in London in 2000, a performance they released on CD. Roger Sutherland died in 2004, but the group continues to perform sporadically. Clive Graham presented a regular show on Resonance FM until March 2006 entitled Sound Poets Exposed. Three of their CDs are available on Paradigm Discs, based in London.

== Discography ==
- Solarisation (1994)
- Formative Causation (1997)
- Reports from the Morphogenetic Research (1997)
- Charivari Music (1998)
- Stromatolites (1999)
- Improvisations (1999)
