= Mark Pauline =

American performance artist and inventor (born 1953)

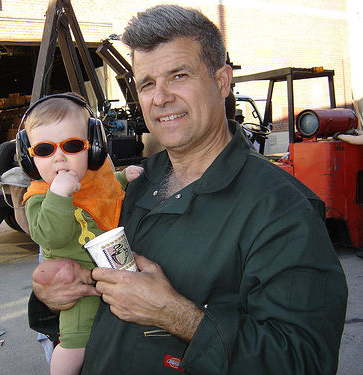
Mark Pauline and his son Jake in 2005

Mark Pauline (born December 14, 1953) is an American performance artist, new media artist, and machine inventor. He is known as founder and director of Survival Research Laboratories.

== Early life and education ==
After high school he had a job at Eglin Air Force Base in Florida, as a sub-contractor maintaining target robots. He is a 1977 graduate of Eckerd College in St. Petersburg, Florida.

== Career ==
Pauline founded SRL in 1978 and it is considered the premier practitioner of "industrial performing arts", and the forerunner of large scale machine performance. Although acknowledged as a major influence on popular competitions pitting remote-controlled robots and machines against each other, such as BattleBots and Robot Wars, Pauline shies away from rules-bound competition preferring a more anarchic approach. Machines are liberated and re-configured away from the functions they were originally meant to perform.

Pauline has written of SRL, "Since its inception SRL has operated as an organization of creative technicians dedicated to re-directing the techniques, tools, and tenets of industry, science, and the military away from their typical manifestations in practicality, product or warfare." Since its beginning through the end of 2006, SRL has conducted about 48 shows, with long titles such as "A Cruel and Relentless Plot to Pervert the Flesh of Beasts to Unholy Uses".

In the summer of 1982, Pauline severely damaged his right hand while experimenting with solid rocket fuel. In August 1990, ArtPark, a state-sponsored arts festival in Lewiston, New York, cancelled a Pauline performance when it turned out he intended "to cover a sputtering Rube Goldberg spaceship with numerous Bibles" that would "serve as thermal protective shields" and be burned to ashes in the course of the performance.

According to Pauline "I like to make machines that can just do their own shows... machines that can do all that machines in the science fiction novels can do. I want to be there to make those dreams real."
