= The Haters =

American noise music and conceptual art troupe

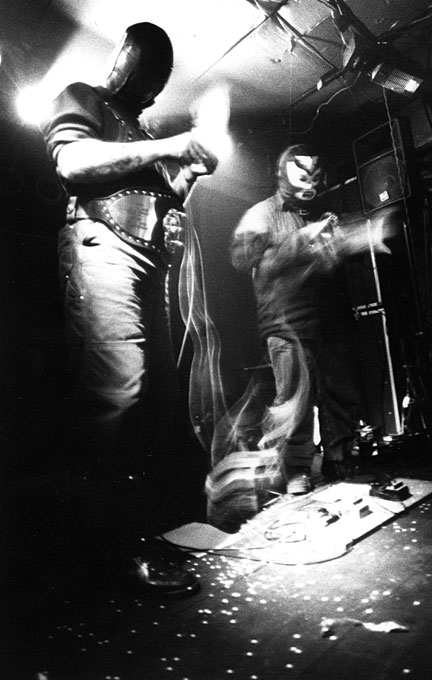
- The Haters in Japan 1999

Background information
- Genres: Noise; Experimental; Performance art
- Years active: 1979–present
- Members: GX Jupitter-Larsen, Jessica King, Pamela duran and Elden M
- Website: jupitter-larsen.com

The Haters are a noise music and conceptual art troupe from the United States. Founded in 1979, they are one of the earliest acts in the modern noise scene. The group is primarily the work of the Hollywood, California-based musician, artist, writer, and filmmaker GX Jupitter-Larsen, accompanied by a constantly changing lineup of other "members", usually local experimental musicians and artists in whatever town a Haters performance happens to take place.

== Origins ==
The group began as Jupitter-Larsen realized he was more interested in making noise and destroying venues than in structured music. Soon the Haters established contacts with like-minded artists in what would become known as the noise music scene, including Merzbow, Maurizio Bianchi, and The New Blockaders. In the late 1970s GX Jupitter-Larsen was done with the Punk scene. At first, in 1979 in New York, the kind of noise he was looking for would not be audible through the ears, but through a kind of sociological transmission. A social distortion instead of sonic feedback was his personal post-punk mandate.

The Haters first performances did not involve any deliberate use of sound. Even if there were any sounds, the audio was secondary. Haters performances at the time were simple actions. Events such as hitting video cassettes with a video camera, watching dust form on a floor, or counting garbage cans along a street.

The Haters only started using sound in live performances because of two necessities. One, the need of a stage curtain, and two, the need to keep track of time.

Traditionally, the opening of the stage curtain signals the beginning of a performance, while the closing signals the conclusion. As nearly no place they performed had such drapery, The Haters needed to come up with something else that would duplicate this function. The Haters started using pre-recorded sounds on tape. The sudden start of the noise let everyone in the audience know that the performance had just begun. Likewise, the abrupt end of the soundtrack unmistakably marked the finale.

== Work and aesthetic ==
Haters performances typically consist of Jupitter-Larsen and one other performer, both wearing masks, creating extremely loud noise using various types of machinery, with the sound distorted and amplified until it is virtually unrecognizable. The Haters' many CD and record releases are usually recordings of these performances. Underlying all the Haters' output is Jupitter-Larsen's peculiar mix of aesthetic and conceptual obsessions, particularly entropy and decay, professional wrestling, and a self-created lexicon consisting mainly of personalized units of measurement such as "polywave," the "totimorphous," and the "xylowave."

A central aspect of the Haters' work is that the sounds they produce are not music. This is a frequently repeated idea among noise artists, if only to distinguish pure harsh noise from more musical related genres such as noise rock, but the Haters take the idea far more literally than most. The sounds they create are made not with musical instruments or even audio equipment, but with physical processes such as grinding, crashing, and other forms of destruction. At the same time, there is always a pronounced, often absurd conceptual element to the group's work.

== The Audience ==
Many of The Haters later performances involved whole audiences being led by inside agitators to actually ruin or destroy entire venues. Proprietors were not always informed of the choreography in advance. These were what The Haters called celebrations of entropy. The audience that was as much a part of the actual performance as the performers were. Without any conditioning beforehand, entire audiences would halt their mayhem the very instant the soundtrack stopped. It made no difference if the attendance was 20 or 200. When the sound stopped, so did the action.

There is also an obvious subsequent utilization of having the extremities of the soundtrack utilized as the movement of a stage curtain. That is, that one can predetermine the length of a performance by choosing the length of the tape for the recording.

At first The Haters did not care what the sound on the tape was as long as it was constant. Otherwise they had no other interest in sound on their stage for years. This did not mean they were not interested in sounds at all. In fact, whenever The Haters were in the studio, they'd always give great detail to every aspect of the sound. A record or CD release, and a live performance are two different things; and they absolutely never saw any reason whatsoever why one had to sound anything like the other.

There were a few exceptions, namely, some conceptual "anti-records" they released in the late 1980s and early 90s. The first, from 1988, was entitled Wind Licked Dirt, and consisted of an uncut vinyl LP in a cover packed with a bunch of small pebbles, which are included to "play" the record with. A later edition of this was made with a "CD" (a clear protective disc from a spindle of blank discs), and it is currently available as a "C-0 cassette." The second was entitled Oxygen is Flammable, and was a broken piece of plastic packaged in a small box. Enclosed were instructions which state that the piece of plastic is a record, and that it's played by pouring water over it. The instructions also call attention to possible similarities between the sounds of water falling and fire rising. The third, Shear, was a ball of cotton batting packaged in a small box. Wrapped around the contents are instructions on three thin strips of paper, which informs the holder that the cotton batting is a recording, which is played by squeezing. The sounds this "record" gives are described by Larsen as being a "sharp fluffy slightness" and a "thin fluffy pressed". These three releases are, in and of themselves, a kind of performance piece. A self-released 7" single from 1983 worked on the same principle; it consisted of two blank grooves and contained instructions to "complete this record by scratching it...".

== Later performances ==
The Haters would experiment with incorporating live sounds with the pre-recorded, but this was never a high priority for them until their 101st performance. There, live sound became a central component for their theatre. San Francisco on June 10, 1990, saw performers each rubbing a calculator against very abrasive sandpaper. Another simple action, but this time a contact-mic had been mounted on the props. The sound of the rubbing was being amplified.

Sound finally became critical for The Haters on stage because GX Jupitter-Larsen wanted to tell a tale, and sound was needed for the narrative. This narrative was about one Ross Rhesymolwaith. Rhesymolwaith was a mathematician whose peace of mind was once said to sound much like calculators being rubbed against sandpaper. Calculation by disintegration as a reference to "a beauty resorting from the wearing down of numbers." Such strongly audible ideals required an equally audible medium.

The Haters would perform this piece, which they called "The Thinking Ross Does", several more times in many different cities over the years.

In their 144th performance, in Zürich they used amplified electric drills to turn large wooden objects into sawdust. The piece was called "Building Empty Holes", but the action itself was still more important than the sounds involved.

It wasn't till their 155th performance, New York City on December 28, 1991, when they found their next major audio fetish. The Haters called it the "clici-clic"; a hand-held hole-punch mounted with a contact-mic for amplification. They would perform this action again and again, over the next ten years.

With their 174th performance, Paris, October 30, 1992, The Haters would slowly push a live microphone into a power grinder to gently wear it down to a stub. As GX has said in many an interview; "Erosion as penetration of the void. For erosion is the only way a solid object can truly penetrate the void." The audience cheered on. This action would become another recurring motif for The Haters for years.

== The 1990s ==
During the 1990s The Haters developed many different recurring techniques using amplified gear. The only reason The Haters started incorporating live sound in performances was to re-emphasize the action taking place. Not for the sake of the sound itself. There's no linear progression here. There are also frequently no verbs, either. Themes and techniques would overlap back and forth, but overall, the performances were getting louder. By 1995 The Haters had ceased using pre-recorded soundtracks all together. They would now use any one of several theatrical devices to function as stage curtains.

Sound became a means of illustrating a narrative. For example, from 2000 to 2002, GX Jupitter-Larsen would balance an amplified calculator on top of the open grill of a small desk fan. This was his way to bring to stage an image. That of mathematician Ross Rhesymolwaith sitting by an open window so he could feel the wind against his face while he did his calculations. The piece was entitled "Dirwyn". The sound and action were the same.

== The Tools ==
The most eventful phase in The Haters use of sound in performance came when, instead of amplifying common tools, they started having their own custom devices built that were made solely for the purpose of making noise. By the late 1990s The Haters became obsessed with the idea of a contrast between what the sound was and how the sound was made.

Wrestling has always been a source of inspiration for them. Wrestling is the purest form of theatre of the absurd; one of non-confrontational violence where stereotypes are exaggerated beyond all recognition.

Since its premiere in early 1999, GX's Untitled Title Belt has become a main sound source both on stage and in the studio. Just by looking at this belt, one would not necessarily be able to tell that this implement is a combination microphone, distortion-pedal, and noise generator. It was fashioned after the traditional championship wrestling belt.

Perhaps the only project of The Haters that is entirely sound based is a piece GX started doing in 2003. In this piece, entitled "Audiothecary", amplified balance scales are used as a performance-based utility for finding the weight of sound. The scales' beam with both of its two pans at either end are all wired to function as one large microphone. Any slight touch, even breathing on them, will produce a very substantial noise.

The Haters latest performance entitled "Loud Luggage / Booming Baggage", first performed in 2010, has them operate amplified suitcases, shaking and banging them about till the luggage eventually breaks.

== Discography ==
- The Totimorphous (1992)
- Blank Banner (1993)
- Wind Licked Dirt (1993)
- Urban Sensitivity (1994)
- Ordinarily Nowhere (1995)
- Mind the Gap (1996)
- Drunk On Decay (1997)
- Hearing Mud Dry (1997)
- Three Phenomena (1997)
- Cultivating Calamity (1997)
- Haters' Voice of Victory (1998)
- Little Fyodor and The Haters (with Little Fyodor) (1998)
- The Haters, Notably Scanner (with Scanner) (1999)
- Survival Research Laboratories (with Mark Pauline) (2001)
- Death-Defying Sickness (2002)
- Untitled Title Shots (2002)
- The Haters 25th Anniversary (2004)
- Zero Is The Journey (with The New Blockaders) (2004)
- Banjax (with Allan Zane) (2005)
- Merzbow & The Haters (with Merzbow) (2006)
- Further (2008)
- The Haters, In The Shade of Fire (2009)
