= Japanoise =

Noise music scene of Japan

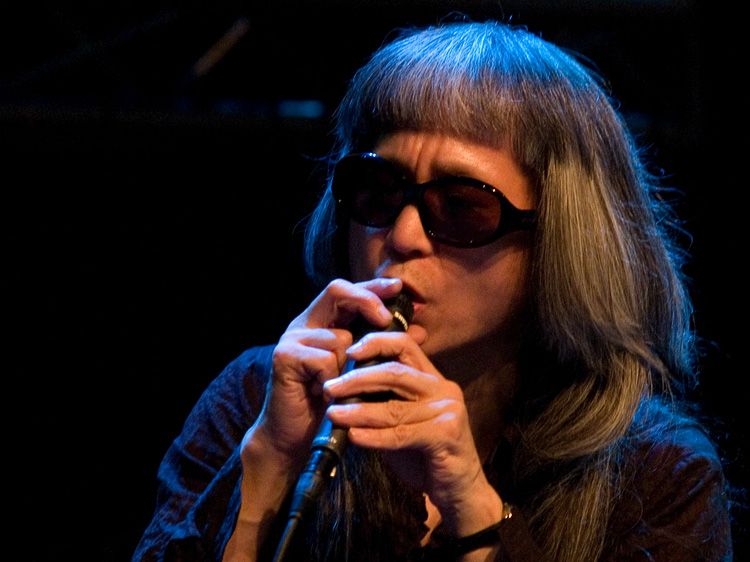
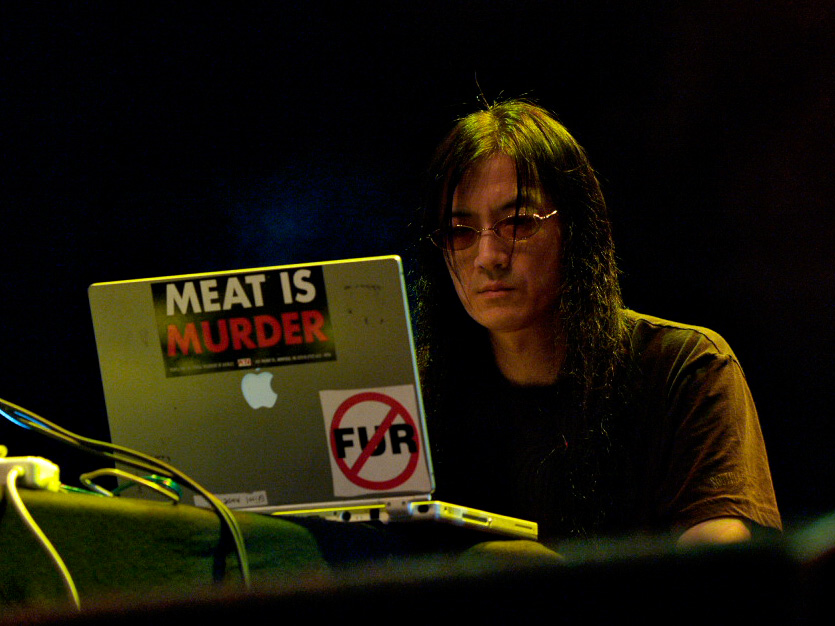
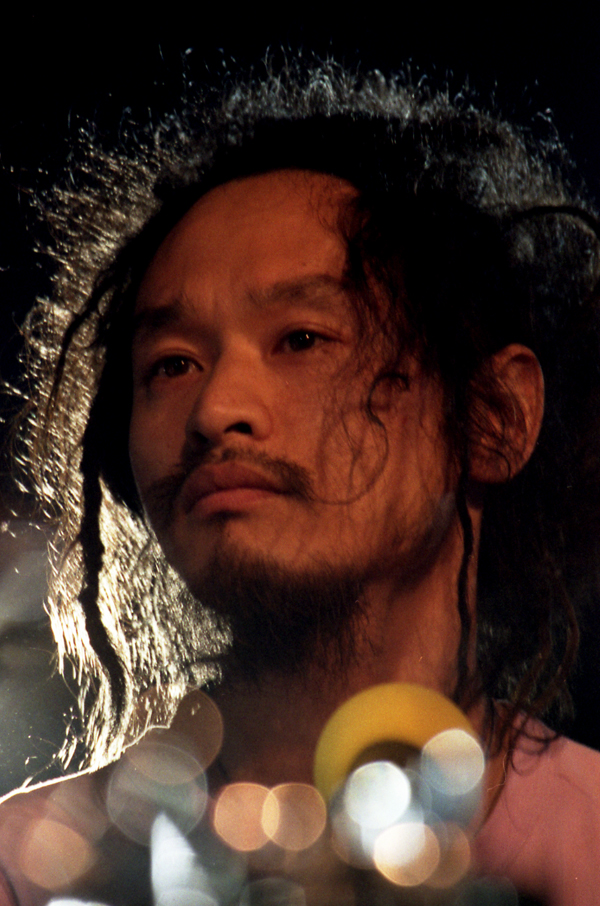
- Keiji Haino (top), Merzbow (bottom left), and Yamantaka Eye (bottom right)
- Stylistic origins: Kansai no wave; noise
- Cultural origins: Late 1970s, Japanese underground; height of popularity in late 1980s and 1990s
- Derivative forms: Harsh noise

Fusion genres
- Power noise; Onkyokei

Other topics
- Post-industrial music; noise rock

Japanoise (ジャパノイズ, Japanoizu), a portmanteau of "Japanese" and "noise", is the distinctively intense and experimental style of noise music that emerged in Japan from the late 1970s onward.

Nick Cain of The Wire identifies the "primacy of Japanese Noise artists like Merzbow, Hijokaidan and Incapacitants" as one of the major developments in noise music since 1990.

Certain Japanese noise artists themselves feel uncomfortable being categorized under the umbrella of "Japanese noise", arguing that use of the term is a way of ignoring the differences between musicians who don't necessarily follow the same approach or even know each other at all.

== History ==
On May 8, 1960, six young Japanese musicians, including Takehisa Kosugi and Yasunao Tone, formed the Group Ongaku with two tape recordings of noise music: Automatism and Object. These recordings made use of a mixture of traditional musical instruments along with a vacuum cleaner, a radio, an oil drum, a doll, and a set of dishes. Moreover, the speed of the tape recording was manipulated, further distorting the sounds being recorded. In the late 1970s and early 1980s, Merzbow took Lou Reed's album Metal Machine Music as a point of departure and further abstracted the noise aesthetic by freeing the sound from guitar based feedback alone, a development that is thought to have heralded noise music as a genre.

According to Paul Hegarty (2007), "In many ways it only makes sense to talk of noise music since the advent of various types of noise produced in Japanese music, and in terms of quantity this is really to do with the 1990s onwards [...]. With the vast growth of Japanese noise, finally, noise music becomes a genre".

== Prominent artists ==
- Hijokaidan
- Merzbow (Masama Akita)
- Onkyokei
- List of Japanoise artists

Other key Japanese noise artists that contributed to this upsurge of activity include Boredoms, C.C.C.C., Incapacitants, KK Null, Yamazaki Maso, Solmania, K2, The Gerogerigegege, Mayuko Hino, Ruins and Hanatarash. During the 1990s, the scene also began to gain recognition overseas, as artists such as Sonic Youth and John Zorn introduced many Japanoise performers to American audiences.
