= The Gerogerigegege =

Japanese noise band

The Gerogerigegege ザ・ゲロゲリゲゲゲ
- Also known as: Nihilist Surfin' Group; The Gero-P
- Origin: Shinjuku, Tokyo, Japan
- Genres: Experimental; noise; punk rock; noisecore; Japanoise; hardcore punk; field recordings; ambient
- Years active: 1985–2001; 2013–present
- Label: Vis a Vis
- Members: Juntaro Yamanouchi
- Past members: Tetsuya Endoh (Gero 30); Toshinori Fukuda; Hironao Komaki

The Gerogerigegege (ザ・ゲロゲリゲゲゲ) (Japanese pronunciation: [za ɡeɾo ɡeɾi ɡeɡeɡe]) (derived from Japanese terms for vomiting, diarrhea and onomatopoeia for an expression of disgust) is a Japanese experimental music project, founded in 1985 by Juntaro Yamanouchi (山ノ内純太郎, Yamanouchi Juntarō).

Though they are often categorized with Japanese harsh noise acts such as Merzbow and Masonna, The Gerogerigegege has also released albums of more straightforward punk rock (Sexual Behavior in the Human Male), noise (45 RPM Performance), and ambient music (None Friendly, Endless Humiliation and >(decrescendo)), in addition to several seven inch records mixing these styles with found recordings. The group is known for their 1990 album Tokyo Anal Dynamite, a 75-track live album drawing from noisecore, noise and hardcore punk.

Despite limited coverage during their initial run, due in part to the material's extreme sound and vulgar subject matter, their music has since garnered a cult following. Juntaro Yamanouchi also ran the Vis a Vis record label.

== History ==
The Gerogerigegege was founded by Juntaro Yamanouchi in 1985, and their first performances took place in S&M clubs. Their first performance outside of said clubs took place at the auditorium of Waseda University in October 1986.

Over the years, The Gerogerigegege has included many members, the most notable and consistent other than Yamanouchi being Gero 30 (aka Gero 56, real name Tetsuya Endoh), an exhibitionist known to masturbate onstage during live performances. Other members have included Toshinori Fukuda (aka Dynamite Gero) on drums, Hironao Komaki (Dee Dee Gero) on guitar, Junko Katoh (Gero Grace Seijoh), their live manager, and Masatoshi Katsuya (Gero Route 66), the band's driver.

The Gerogerigegege is known for their releasing records with unusual concepts, such as 1989's Showa (昭和) released after the death of Hirohito, which bookended a recording of people having sex to "Kimigayo", the Japanese national anthem. A special edition of Showa falsely presented itself as a Ramones bootleg called Britzkrieg '75 (Demo Tracks), with no mention of Gerogerigegege or Showa anywhere on the release. The Night 7″ features a recording of a man defecating into a toilet after the usual "one, two, three, four" count. The compilation album Recollections of Primary Masturbation contains 338 songs, including the entirety of Tokyo Anal Dynamite as one track.

There are also some non-musical conceptual releases including Shaking Box Music: You Are the Noise Maker, which consists of 100 blank cassettes in a large metal box. This Is Shaking Box Music Part 2, which is a destroyed copy of the Mother Fellatio EP in a cassette case. Art Is Over consists of a single octopus tentacle housed in a cassette box. These non-music releases were typically released in even smaller quantities than the music releases, in quantities of 50 or less. Similar concepts are rampant throughout the band's catalog, and often, the more ridiculous the theme or packaging of a release is, the more sought after it is by collectors. Copies of some Gerogerigegege records sell for hundreds of US dollars.

Following the release of Saturday Night Big Cock Salaryman in 2001, The Gerogerigegege became inactive. Yamanouchi had seemingly disappeared and people who had dealings with The Gerogerigegege had no idea on how to contact him. Rumors proliferated regarding his fate, often driven by speculation based on the group's musical output. On 27 August 2013, a Twitter post from Gidayū Kaitai (解体義太夫) stated that he had been contacted by Yamanouchi.

The first release from Gerogerigegege in 15 years, Moenai Hai (燃えない灰), was released on 20 April 2016 by Eskimo Records in Japan. This was followed up in 2019 with Uguisudani Apocalypse.

== Discography ==
=== Albums ===
- Studio and Live (as The Gero-P) (1985)
- The Gerogerigegege (1985)
- Senzuri Champion (1987)
- Showa (昭和) (1988)
- Tokyo Anal Dynamite (1990)
- Live Greatest Hits (1991)
- Senzuri Power Up (1991)
- 45RPM Performance (1992)
- Hotel Ultra (1993)
- Nothing to Hear, Nothing to... 1985 (1993)
- Endless Humiliation (1994)
- Instruments Disorder (1994)
- Piano River (1995)
- Mort Douce Live (1996)
- Hell Driver (1999)
- None Friendly (1999)
- RRRecycled Music (~1999)
- Saturday Night Big Cock Salaryman (2001)
- 燃えない灰 (Moenai Hai) (2016)
- Uguisudani Apocalypse (2019)
- Piano River (2019)
- Gig In Train Blackout Archive V.2 (2019)
- Gig In Train Blackout Archive V.3 (2019)
- 三条の滝 Blackout Archive V.4 (2019)
- Piss Shower Girlfriend (2020)
- >(decrescendo) (2020)
- 直美のオナニーと若草寮案内 RE-ISSUE (2021)
- Hand Made Broken Orgel (2022)
- 新宿に命さびしむ歌多し (2022)
- >(decrescendo) Final Chapter (2022)

=== Singles and EPs ===
- Sexual Behavior in the Human Male (1988)
- All My Best, with Love Juntaro (~1990)
- William Bennett Is My Dick (~1990)
- No Sound (~1990)
- More Shit E.P. (1992)
- Senzuri Monkey Metal Action (1992)
- Kitanomaru Hyakkei (北の丸百景, A Hundred Famous Views of Kitanomaru) (1993)
- Night (1993)
- Yellow Trash Bazooka (1993)
- Mother Fellatio (1993)
- Life Documents (1994)
- Senzuri Fight Back (1994)
- All You Need Is Audio Shock (1995)
- Veel Plezier met de Gerogerigegege! (1995)
- Wreck of Rock 'n' Roll Former Self (1995)
- Gay Sex Can Be Aids (1996) (split with Origami Erotika)
- Seven Inches of Meat (1996) (split with Origami Erotika)
- "Ramones" (1996) (split with Bastard Noise)
- Yasukuni Jinja (靖國神社, Yasukuni Shrine) (1996)
- Eternal Energy (1997) (split with Psyalpinx)
- HGI (~1998)
- Early Dream Exit (2000)
- Live in USA (2001) (split with Crowd Surfers Must Die)
- The Gerogerigegege (2017)

=== Compilations ===
- Singles 1985–1993 (1994)
- Recollections of Primary Masturbation (1998)
- All You Need Is an Audio Shock by Japanese Ultra Shit Band (2012)
