= Government Alpha =

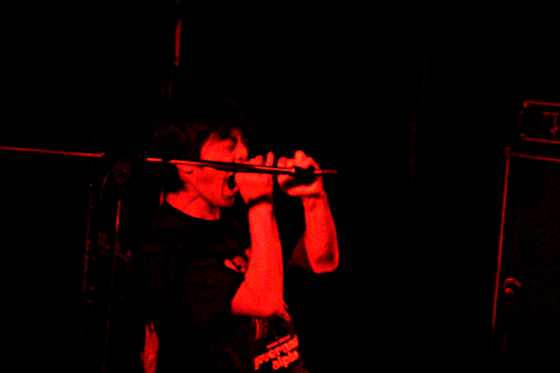
- Government Alpha live in 2008

Background information
- Also known as: Carbonic Acid
- Origin: Tokyo
- Genres: Noise
- Occupation(s): noise musician, record label owner
- Years active: 1992–present
- Labels: Xerxes
- Website: www.geocities.jp/xerxes_alpha2001/

Yasutoshi Yoshida (吉田恭淑, Yoshida Yasutoshi), better known by his stage name Government Alpha, is a Japanese noise musician.

== Partial discography ==
Albums

- 1969/1999 (1999)
- Alphaville (1999)
- Sporadic Spectra (1999)
- Aerial Patrol EP (2002)
- Artificial Pomegranate (2003)
- Snappish Saurel (2003)
- Strange Days (2003)
- Prospective Massacre (2005)
- Strange Days 2 (2005)
- Ignis Fatuus (2005)
- Venomous Cumulus Cloud (2007)
- Subtle Drugs (2010 Neon Blossom Records)

Split releases

- Saturday Night Groove Sessions with Jazzkammer (2002)
- Radiation Snowfall with Bastard Noise (2003)
- Planet of Fluctuation with MSBR (2003)
- Das Methadonprogramm with Azoikum (2005)
