= C.C.C.C. (band) =

Japanese noise band

- Also known as: Cosmic Coincidence Control Center
- Origin: Japan
- Genres: Noise
- Years active: 1989–present
- Labels: Endorphine Factory, Cold Spring
- Members: Mayuko Hino; Ryuichi Nagakubo; Fumio Kosakai; Hiroshi Hasegawa

C.C.C.C. (a.k.a. Cosmic Coincidence Control Center) is a Japanese noise band named after John C. Lilly's hierarchical group of cosmic entities.

The core line up consisted of former actress Mayuko Hino and Hiroshi Hasegawa. Hino would occasionally, during live shows, reprise this element of her past into her performances by engaging in such acts as onstage striptease. Another notorious feature of their live shows was the plastic bags of urine that were thrown into the audience. Other members were occasionally and variably brought in for work on single albums, but had no permanent membership in the band.

Aesthetically, the band - and Mayuko Hino in particular - advocated a very emotive and cathartic approach to noise music as opposed to the conceptual and intellectual approaches advocated by many European noise musicians, most notably within the "power electronics" subgenre. Mayuko Hino believes that an emotional, rather than an intellectual, approach to noise not only creates more interesting sounds, but reveals much about the personality of the noisemaker.

Sonically, C.C.C.C.'s early releases were much quieter and less distorted than most other Japanoise releases of that time due to the live, analogue nature of the recordings. Later releases, such as "Rocket Shrine" and "Love and Noise", however, took the psychedelic ambiance and oddball sounds of early C.C.C.C., but amplified the volume and distortion levels to easily be as loud and harsh as other Japanese noise bands, if not more so. The band's later releases rank among the more sonically diverse of noise music albums, exploring an incredible variety of sonic dissonances, while still maintaining a consistently ear-splitting loudness.

By the end of 90s, the band had stopped performing and recording. Hiroshi Hasegawa has moved on, by all appearances, to doing experimental ambiance, this time as part of Astro. In 1995, Mayuko Hino released an album called Chaos of the Night, which also starred Monte Cazazza of "Industrial Records" fame. In 1998, they performed at Queen Elizabeth Hall on 2nd of July during John Peel Meltdown.

== Discography ==
- Reflexive Universe (1991) (Cassette)
- Phantasmagoria (1992) (Cassette, S/Sided)
- Cosmic Coincidence Control Center (1992) (CD)
- Amplified Crystal (1993) (12", Ltd, Cle)
- Amplified Crystal II (1993) (Cassette)
- Loud Sounds Dopa / Live In U.S.A. (1993) (CD)
- Community Center Cyber Crash / Live In Pittsburgh (1994) (LP)
- Gnosis (1994) (Cassette)
- Test Tube Fantasy (1994) (7", Ltd, Cle)
- Live At AS 220 (1995) (7", Ltd, Blu)
- Recorded Live At Broken Life Festival, Taipei, Taiwan September 9th 1995 (1995) (CDr, Ltd)
- Flash (1996) (CD)
- Love & Noise (1996) (CD)
- The Beauty of Pollution (with Nocturnal Emissions) (1996) (CD)
- Rocket Shrine (1997) (CD)
- Untitled (1997) (CD)
- Polygon Islands 1 & 2 (1998) (7", Ltd, Gre)
- Chaos is the Cosmos (2007)
- Early Works 4CD Box (2007)
- Black Light / Black Heat (2009)
- Live At Velvet Sun (2010) (Cassette, S/Sided)
- Old Street In Taiwan - Aktion 950907 (with Con-Dom and Schimpfluch-Gruppe) (Tochnit Aleph) (CDr)
- C.C.C.C. / Junk Sick (2011)
- Tokyo Alive 1995 (with Merzbow) (2015)

== Video releases ==
- Deep Electronics Live (1991) (VHS)
- Live at Club Lower Links (1992) (VHS, NTSC)
- Loud Sounds Dopa (1993) (VHS)
- Tokyo Alive 1995 (2015) (VCD, NTSC) with Merzbow; directed by Jadis Mercado
