= Noise music =

Music genre

- Other names: Noise
- Stylistic origins: Modernism; avant-garde; experimental; electronic; futurism; dada; musique concrète; indeterminacy; modern classical; free improvisation; found sound; fluxus; electroacoustic music; stochastic music; danger music; sound collage; tape music
- Cultural origins: 1910s, Italy; 1960s – late 1970s, United States, Japan and Europe
- Derivative forms: Kansai no wave; industrial; post-industrial; outsider house; dark ambient; danger music; glitch; industrial hip-hop; post-noise psychedelia

Subgenres
- Power electronics; death industrial; harsh noise; harsh noise wall

Fusion genres
- Power noise; noisegrind

Regional scenes
- Japan; Indonesia

Local scenes
- Brooklyn noise

Other topics
- Ambient music; extratone; noise rock; noisecore; noise pop; no wave; free jazz; avant-rock; list of noise musicians; lo-fi; microsound; noise in music; performance art; sound sculpture; anti-art

Noise music (or simply noise) is a subgenre of experimental music that is characterised by its use of unwanted noise as a primary musical element. The genre has roots in early 20th century avant-garde music, but later drew influence from industrial and electronic music. It is characterized by a rejection of conventional music theory and traditional song structures, often featuring little or no melody, rhythm, or harmony. This type of music tends to challenge the conventional distinction between musical and non-musical sound.

"Noise as music" originated as an avant-garde music style in the 1910s through the work of Luigi Russolo, an Italian Futurist who published the manifesto The Art of Noises in 1913. Elements of noise music were later explored by artists in the Dada and Fluxus movements, as well as through electroacoustic music, modern classical and musique concrète. Composers such as John Cage, Edgard Varèse, and James Tenney would explicitly use the term "noise" to describe some of their experimental practices. During the 1960s and 1970s, compositions such as Robert Ashley's "The Wolfman" (1964) and Pauline Oliveros's "A Little Noise In The System" (1967) were among the earliest examples of contemporary noise music, while works by non-academic artists such as Lou Reed's Metal Machine Music were influential for later noise artists.

By the late 1970s and early 1980s, the emergence of industrial music and commercial synthesizers, encouraged non-musicians to experiment with strictly noise-oriented styles, leading to genres such as power electronics, coined by the English group Whitehouse, as well as post-industrial styles like dark ambient, death industrial and power noise. The 1980s cassette underground would facilitate most of these releases. In Japan, the Japanoise scene, which stemmed out of the Kansai no wave movement, produced several influential noise acts such as Merzbow, Hijokaidan, Hanatarash, C.C.C.C., and Incapacitants, who, together with American and European noise artists the Haters, Daniel Menche, Vomir, and Richard Ramirez, contributed to the emergence of harsh noise and harsh noise wall into the 1990s.

During the 2000s and 2010s, the American noise underground, drawing from the Brooklyn noise scene, blended kosmische Musik, progressive electronic, ambient, drone and new age into a style known as post-noise. The movement had been catalyzed by the Skaters, a group formed by James Ferraro and Spencer Clark in 2004. Artists included Oneohtrix Point Never, Pocahaunted, Zola Jesus, Laurel Halo, Sun Araw, Yellow Swans, and Emeralds.

== Etymology ==
According to Danish noise and music theorist Torben Sangild, no single definition of noise in music is possible. Sangild instead provides three basic definitions of noise: a musical acoustics definition, a second communicative definition based on distortion or disturbance of a communicative signal, and a third definition based in subjectivity (what is noise to one person can be meaningful to another; what was considered unpleasant sound yesterday is not today).

White noise
10 second sample of white noise.

In common use, the word noise means unwanted sound or noise pollution. In electronics, noise can refer to the electronic signal corresponding to acoustic noise (in an audio system) or the electronic signal corresponding to the (visual) noise commonly seen as 'snow' on a degraded television or video image. In signal processing or computing, it can be considered data without meaning; that is, data that is not being used to transmit a signal, but is simply produced as an unwanted by-product of other activities. Noise can block, distort, or change the meaning of a message in both human and electronic communication. White noise is a random signal (or process) with a flat power spectral density. In other words, the signal contains equal power within a fixed bandwidth at any center frequency. White noise is considered analogous to white light which contains all frequencies.

According to Murray Schafer, there are four types of noise: unwanted noise, unmusical sound, any loud sound, and a disturbance in any signaling system (such as static on a telephone). Definitions regarding what is considered noise, relative to music, have changed over time. Ben Watson, in his article Noise as Permanent Revolution, points out that Ludwig van Beethoven's Grosse Fuge (1825) "sounded like noise" to his audience at the time. Indeed, Beethoven's publishers persuaded him to remove it from its original setting as the last movement of a string quartet. He did so, replacing it with a sparkling Allegro. They subsequently published it separately.

In the 1920s, the French composer Edgard Varèse was influenced by the ideals of New York Dada associated via Marcel Duchamp and Francis Picabia's magazine 391. He conceived of the elements of his music in terms of sound-masses. This resulted in his compositions Offrandes, Hyperprism, Octandre, and Intégrales of the early 1920s. Varèse declared that "to stubbornly conditioned ears, anything new in music has always been called noise", and he posed the question "What is music but organized noises?"

In attempting to define noise music and its value, Paul Hegarty (2007) cites the work of noted cultural critics Jean Baudrillard, Georges Bataille, and Theodor Adorno and, through their work, traces the history of "noise". He defines noise at different times as "intrusive, unwanted", "lacking skill, not being appropriate" and "a threatening emptiness". He traces these trends starting with 18th-century concert-hall music. Hegarty contends that John Cage's composition 4'33", in which an audience and performer sit through four and a half minutes of "silence" (Cage 1973), represents the beginning of noise music proper. For Hegarty, "noise music", as with 4'33", is that music made up of incidental sounds that represent perfectly the tension between "desirable" sound (properly played musical notes) and undesirable "noise" that make up all noise music.

== Characteristics ==
Like much of modern and contemporary art, noise music takes characteristics of the perceived negative traits of noise mentioned below and uses them in aesthetic and imaginative ways.

Noise music can feature acoustically or electronically generated noise, and both traditional and unconventional musical instruments. It may incorporate live machine sounds, non-musical vocal techniques, physically manipulated audio media, processed sound recordings, field recording, computer-generated noise, noise produced by stochastic processes, and other randomly produced electronic signals such as distortion, feedback, static, hiss and hum. There may also be emphasis on high volume levels and lengthy, continuous pieces. More generally noise music may contain aspects such as improvisation, extended technique, cacophony and indeterminacy. In many instances, conventional use of melody, harmony, rhythm, or pulse is dispensed with.

In much the same way the early modernists were inspired by naïve art, some contemporary digital art noise musicians are excited by the archaic audio technologies such as wire-recorders, the 8-track cartridge, and vinyl records. Many artists not only build their own noise-generating devices, but even their own specialized recording equipment and custom software (for example, the C++ software used in creating the viral symphOny by Joseph Nechvatal).

Contemporary noise music is often associated with extreme volume and distortion, as well as computerized sounds and 8+kHz sine waves.

== History ==
=== Pre-20th century ===
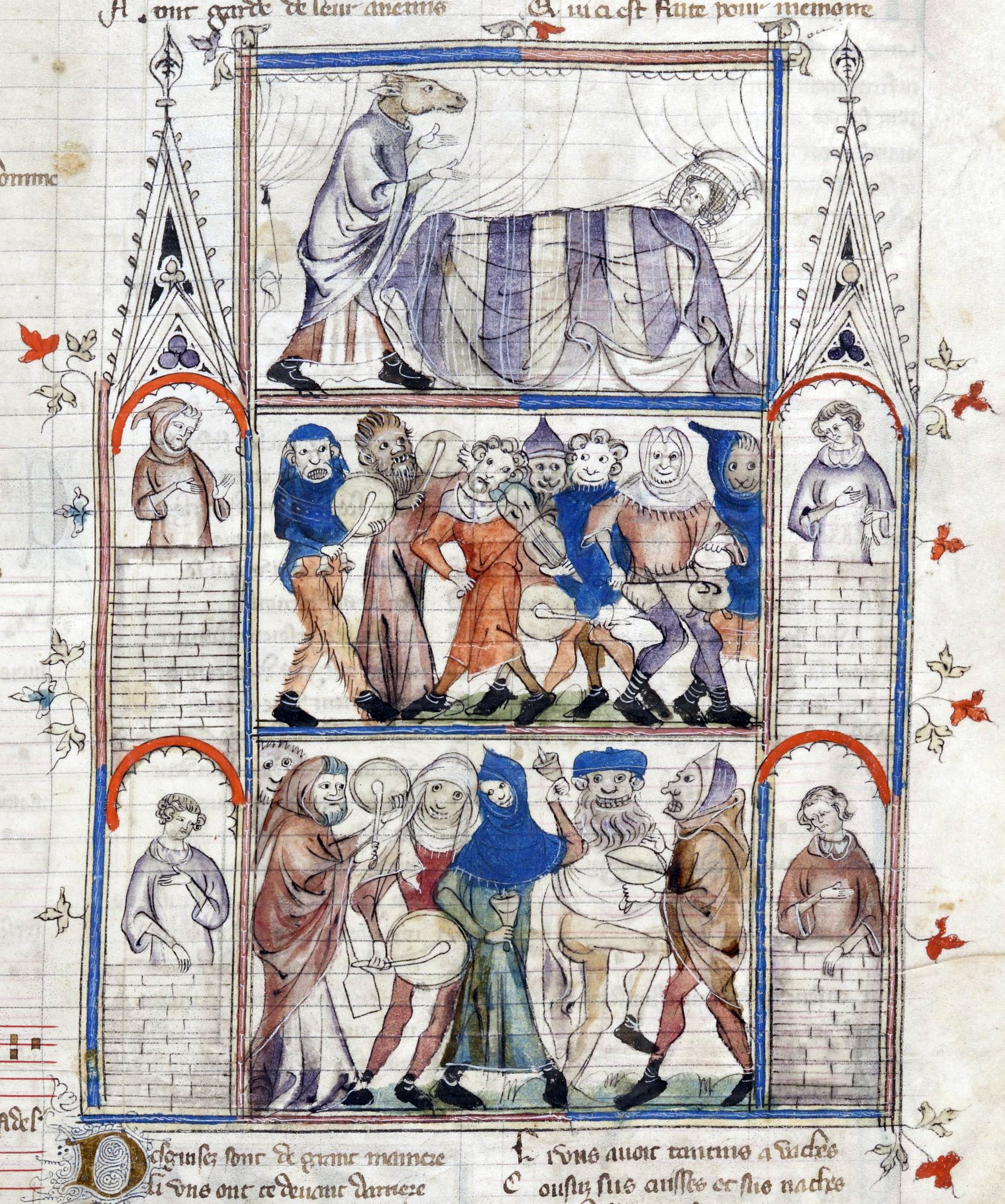
Depiction of charivari, early 14th century (from the Roman de Fauvel)

During the 14th century, the charivari, a European and North American folk custom designed to shame a member of the community, made use of a mock parade aimed to make as much noise as possible by beating on pots and pans or anything that came to hand, these parades were often referred to as "rough music". By the 19th century, the classical period led to one of the earliest examples of non-musical sounds being used in contemporary western music such as Beethoven’s Wellington's Victory (1813), which included sounds of muskets and cannons to represent battle. Later, Tchaikovsky’s 1812 Overture (1880) went further by writing real cannon fire directly into the score.

=== 1910s–1930s: Early noise music ===
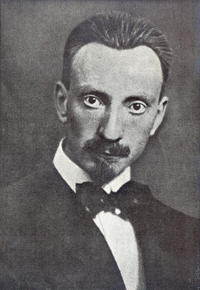
Luigi Russolo c. 1916

French composer Carol-Bérard born in 1885 was a pupil of Isaac Albéniz. Bérard studied and was influenced by primitive music and instruments. During the early 1900s, he experimented with noises as music, developed a notation system for them, and wrote on the challenges of instrumenting noise music. In 1910, Bérard composed a Symphony of Mechanical Force. His work made the connection between music and noise publicly visible years before Futurism.

By 1913, Italian Futurist artist Luigi Russolo wrote his manifesto, L'Arte dei Rumori, translated as The Art of Noises, stating that the industrial revolution had given modern men a greater capacity to appreciate more complex sounds: "We must break this restricted circle of pure sounds and conquer the infinite variety of noise-sounds". Russolo found traditional melodic music confining and envisioned noise music as its future replacement. He designed and constructed a number of noise-generating devices called intonarumori and assembled a noise orchestra to perform with them. Works entitled Risveglio di una città (Awakening of a City) and Convegno d'aeroplani e d'automobili (The Meeting of Aeroplanes and Automobiles) were both performed for the first time in 1914.

A performance of his Gran Concerto Futuristico (1917) was met with strong disapproval and violence from the audience, as Russolo himself had predicted. None of his intoning devices have survived, though recently some have been reconstructed and used in performances. Although Russolo's works bear little resemblance to contemporary noise music, his efforts helped to introduce noise as an intentional musical aesthetic and broaden the perception of traditionally unwanted sound as an artistic medium.

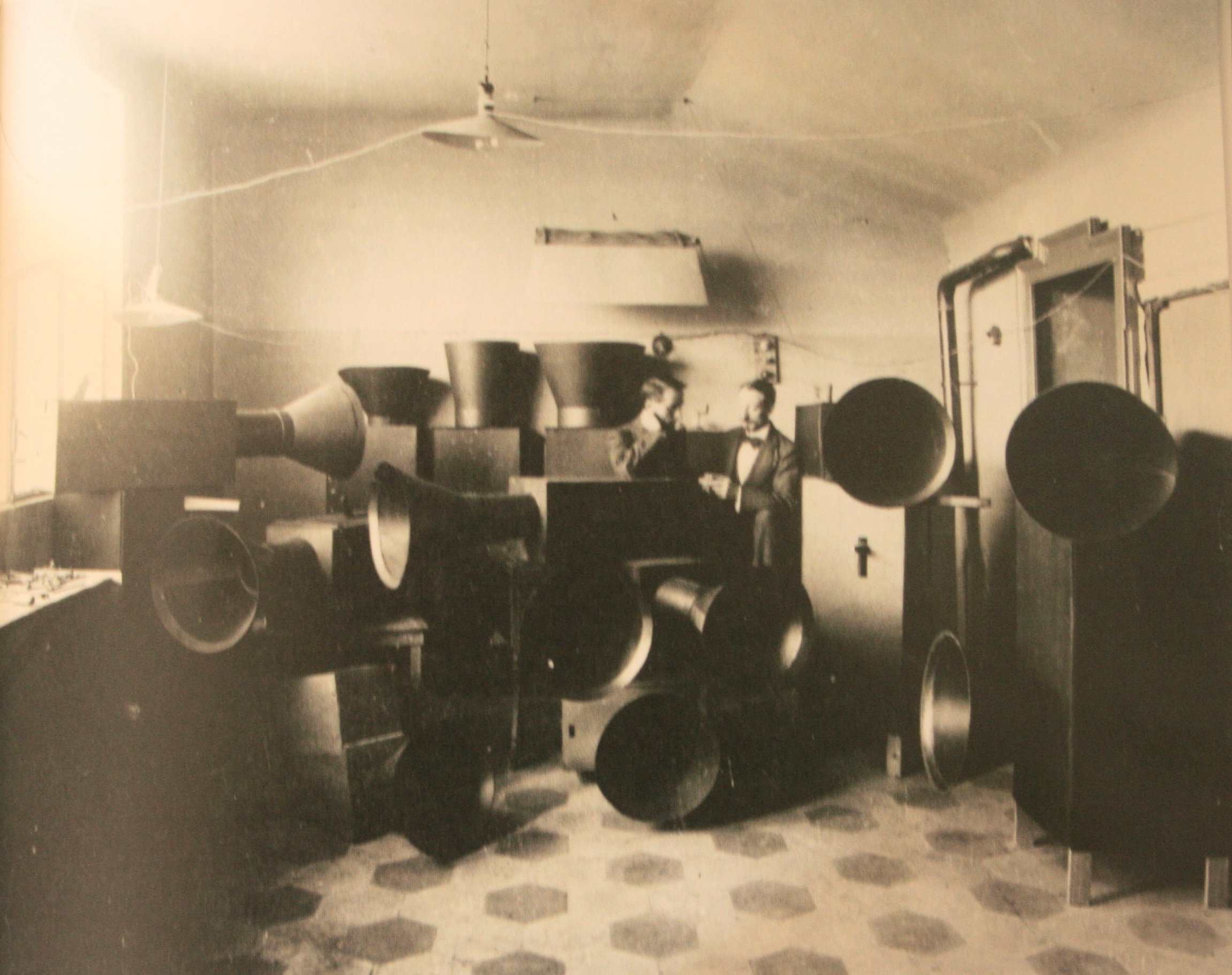
Luigi Russolo and his assistant Ugo Piatti in their Milan studio in 1913 with the Intonarumori (noise machines)

At first the art of music sought purity, limpidity and sweetness of sound. Then different sounds were amalgamated, care being taken, however, to caress the ear with gentle harmonies. Today music, as it becomes continually more complicated, strives to amalgamate the most dissonant, strange and harsh sounds. In this way we come ever closer to noise-sound.

— Luigi Russolo The Art of Noises (1913)

Antonio Russolo, Luigi's brother and fellow Italian Futurist composer, produced a recording of two works featuring the original intonarumori. The 1921 made phonograph with works entitled Corale and Serenata, combined conventional orchestral music set against the famous noise machines and is the only surviving sound recording.

The Dada art movement's Antisymphony concert performed on April 30, 1919, in Berlin would also be an early influence and progenitor of noise music. The Dada-related work from 1916 by Marcel Duchamp also worked with noise, but in an almost silent way. One of the found object Readymades of Marcel Duchamp, A Bruit Secret (With Hidden Noise), was a collaborative work that created a noise instrument that Duchamp accomplished with Walter Arensberg. What rattles inside when A Bruit Secret is shaken remains a mystery.

==== Found sound ====
In the same period the utilisation of found sound as a musical resource was starting to be explored. In 1931, Edgard Varèse's Ionisation for 13 players featured 2 sirens, a lion's roar, and used 37 percussion instruments to create a repertoire of unpitched sounds making it the first musical work to be organized solely on the basis of noise. In remarking on Varese's contributions the American composer John Cage stated that Varese had "established the present nature of music" and that he had "moved into the field of sound itself while others were still discriminating 'musical tones' from noises".

In an essay written in 1937, Cage expressed an interest in using extra-musical materials and came to distinguish between found sounds, which he called noise, and musical sounds, examples of which included: rain, static between radio channels, and "a truck at fifty miles per hour". Essentially, Cage made no distinction, in his view all sounds have the potential to be used creatively. His aim was to capture and control elements of the sonic environment and employ a method of sound organisation, a term borrowed from Varese, to bring meaning to the sound materials. Cage began in 1939 to create a series of works that explored his stated aims, the first being Imaginary Landscape #1 for instruments including two variable speed turntables with frequency recordings.

I believe that the use of noise to make music will continue and increase until we reach a music produced through the aid of electrical instruments which will make available for musical purposes any and all sounds that can be heard.

— John Cage The Future of Music: Credo (1937)

=== 1940s–1960s: Electroacoustic music and musique concrète ===
During the late 1940s, French composer Pierre Schaeffer theorized and coined a type of electroacoustic music known as musique concrète. Schaeffer's 1948 compositions Cinq études de bruits (Five Noise Studies), that began with Etude aux Chemins de Fer (Railway Study), which consisted of locomotive sounds made at the Paris train station Gare des Batignolles. This premiered via a radio broadcast on October 5, 1948, called Concert de bruits (Noise Concert).

Under the influence of Henry Cowell in San Francisco in the late 1940s, Lou Harrison and John Cage began composing music for junk (waste) percussion ensembles, scouring junkyards and Chinatown antique shops for appropriately tuned brake drums, flower pots, gongs, and more. Music journalist Paul Hegarty retrospectively remarked that Antonin Artaud's 1947 composition Pour en Finir avec le Jugement de dieu (To Have Done with the Judgment of God) as "a great example of how literal noise becomes a more interesting threat." In 1957, Edgard Varèse created on tape an extended piece of electronic music using noises created by scraping, thumping and blowing titled Poème électronique.

In 1960, John Cage completed his noise composition Cartridge Music for phono cartridges with foreign objects replacing the stylus and small sounds amplified by contact microphones. That same year, Nam June Paik composed Fluxusobjekt for fixed tape and hand-controlled tape playback head. On May 8, six young Japanese musicians, including Takehisa Kosugi and Yasunao Tone, who later joined the Japanese branch of the Fluxus art movement, formed the early noise music collective Group Ongaku, recording Automatism and Object. These recordings made use of a mixture of traditional musical instruments along with a vacuum cleaner, a radio, an oil drum, a doll, and a set of dishes. Moreover, the speed of the tape recording was manipulated, further distorting the sounds being recorded. Tone later became an early pioneer of "glitch" music in the 1990s.

In 1961, James Tenney composed Analogue #1: Noise Study (for tape) using computer synthesized noise and Collage No.1 (Blue Suede) (for tape) by manipulating Elvis Presley's recording of "Blue Suede Shoes". By 1964, composer Robert Ashley released the composition "The Wolfman", in a retrospective, The Wire stated, "he [Robert Ashley] played his own vocals through loudspeakers simultaneously with a tape composition and controlled the feedback by putting his mouth up against the mic. The avalanche of noise was so overpowering to the listener that no one ever understands how the sound is made". In 1965, London free improvisation group AMM was founded by Keith Rowe, Lou Gare and Eddie Prévost, their work has been considered as presaging noise music, with AllMusic's Brian Olewnick stating, "noise bands owe it to themselves to check out their primary source." In Canada, Nihilist Spasm Band, the world's longest-running self-described "noise band", was formed that same year, they later worked with artists they influenced such as Thurston Moore of Sonic Youth and Jojo Hiroshige of Hijokaidan in the 1990s.

In 1966, New York band the Velvet Underground released its first recording, a track titled "Noise" that was originally recorded by John Cale in 1964. Lou Reed and John Cale later cited the drone music of La Monte Young as being a major influence, with Reed later drawing from Young on his solo album Metal Machine Music. Cale later released early noise music recordings made with Tony Conrad in the early to-mid 60s, such as Inside the Dream Syndicate series.

In 1967, composer Pauline Oliveros released the composition "A Little Noise In The System", regarded as one of the earliest examples of contemporary noise music. Other contemporaneous developments include underground and psychedelic acts such as Intersystems, Musica Elettronica Viva, the Mothers of Invention, Red Krayola, Michael Yonkers, Cromagnon, Pärson Sound, the Godz, the Ethix, the Sperm and Fifty Foot Hose. In 1968, the Beatles' The White Album incorporated influences from musique concrète on track "Revolution 9", alongside George Harrison's Electronic Sound and John Lennon's Two Virgins and Life with the Lions albums with Yoko Ono who had been a part of the New York Fluxus scene.

=== 1970s–1990s: Contemporary noise music ===
In 1975, Lou Reed released the double album Metal Machine Music, which has been cited as containing the primary characteristics of contemporary noise music and inspiring artists such as Merzbow. The album, recorded on a three speed Uher machine and mastered/engineered by Bob Ludwig, is an early, well-known example of commercial studio noise music that the music critic Lester Bangs sarcastically called the "greatest album ever made in the history of the human eardrum". It has also been cited as one of the "worst albums of all time". At the time, RCA also released a Quadrophonic version of the Metal Machine Music recording that was produced by playing the master tape back both forward and backward, and by flipping the tape over.

By the late 1970s to early 1980s, the emergence of industrial music encouraged non-musicians to experiment with strictly noise oriented styles, leading to genres such as power electronics, coined by English noise act Whitehouse, as well as power noise which drew influence from Spanish industrial group Esplendor Geométrico. Followed by post-industrial styles such as dark ambient and death industrial.

In Japan, artists such as Aunt Sally, Inu, Ultra Bide members Hide and Jojo Hiroshige, and SS became a part of the Kansai no wave scene centered around Osaka, Kobe, Kyoto and other parts of the Kansai region. The movement drew from New York's no wave scene, and later led to the emergence of the Japanoise movement, which was spearheaded by prominent noise acts such as Merzbow, Hijokaidan, Hanatarash, C.C.C.C. and Incapacitants, who alongside American and European noise artists the Haters, Daniel Menche, Vomir and Richard Ramirez, contributed to the formation of harsh noise and harsh noise wall. In the 1990s, noise music began incorporating influences from computerized sounds such as those found in "glitch" music.

Outside of the Western and Japanese scenes, noise music has also developed in Southeast Asia, where a number of experimental artists and groups emerged from the 1990s onward. Indonesian duo Senyawa combines traditional instruments with harsh, abrasive sounds, blending local cultural elements with noise experimentation. Thailand's Mongoose and Filipino project Children of Cathode Ray are also noted as pioneers in their respective countries, gaining recognition through international performances and underground networks.

=== 2000s–2010s: American noise underground, Brooklyn noise and Post-noise ===
During the 2000s and 2010s, the Brooklyn noise scene emerged as spearheaded by acts such as Black Dice and Wolf Eyes. The American noise underground later began infusing influences from kosmische musik, progressive electronic, ambient, drone and new age, which led to the development of post-noise psychedelia. Music critic Simon Reynolds credited the Skaters, a group formed by James Ferraro and Spencer Clark in 2004, with catalyzing an "international post-noise network". Associated artists such as Daniel Lopatin and Emeralds, had been a part of the Brooklyn noise scene and initially described as "outcasts among outcasts" due to their rejection of then noise conventions and introduction of "'70s cosmic trance music and '80s new age" into their style of noise music. Lopatin described "post-noise" as a move away from "macho" noise music, while Emeralds felt a growing boredom with noise "a sense we'd done it: We get this emotion."

Other notable artists include Pocahaunted, Zola Jesus, Dolphins into the Future, Sun Araw, Yellow Swans, Stellar Om Source, Laurel Halo, and Xiphiidae. This style influenced the development of neo-kosmische, vaporwave, hypnagogic pop, nu-new age, and glo-fi. In 2019, Nashville, Tennessee artist River Everett's ambient and new age project New Mexican Stargazers drew heavy inspiration from the work of James Ferraro and Spencer Clark. Her work under the duo Bagel Fanclub alongside Caybee Calabash, has been characterized as spanning "post-noise pastiches and dense braindance."

=== 2020s ===
Additionally, the popularity of the harsh noise genre expanded with regional scenes emerging internationally in Japan, England, Canada, Indonesia and America. By the 2020s, some harsh noise artists would gain notoriety and attention on the internet through social media, due to their unconventional sound.

== Legacy ==
In Noise: The Political Economy of Music (1985), Jacques Attali explores the relationship between noise music and the future of society by considering noise music as not merely reflective of, but importantly pre-figurative of social transformations. He indicates that noise in music is a predictor of social change and demonstrates how noise acts as the subconscious of society—validating and testing new social and political realities. His alternative view of the standard history of music, with his emphasis on noise, theorized culture in a way that influenced many noise music theoretical studies to follow, such as Brandon LaBelle's Background Noise: Perspectives on Sound Art (2006), Alan Licht's Sound Art: Beyond Music, between Categories (2007), Thomas Bey William Bailey's Micro Bionic: Radical Electronic Music and Sound Art in the 21st Century (2009), Caleb Kelly's Cracked Media: The Sound of Malfunction (2009), Joseph Nechvatal's Immersion Into Noise (2011), and Mark Delaere's Noise as a Constructive Element in Music Theoretical and Music-Analytical Perspectives (2022).

Writer Douglas Kahn, in his work Noise, Water, Meat: A History of Sound in the Arts (1999), discusses the use of noise as a medium and explores the ideas of Antonin Artaud, George Brecht, William Burroughs, Sergei Eisenstein, Fluxus, Allan Kaprow, Michael McClure, Yoko Ono, Jackson Pollock, Luigi Russolo, and Dziga Vertov.

In 2008, independent filmmaker Adam Cornelius released a documentary on the contemporary noise music scene titled People Who Do Noise, the film featured avant-garde noise artists such as Smegma, Oscillating Innards, Yellow Swans, and Daniel Menche.

== Related scenes and genres ==
=== Industrial music ===
Industrial music (also known as industrial) is a music genre inspired by post-industrial society, that originally emerged in the 1970s, drawing influences from avant-garde and early electronic music genres such as musique concrète, tape music, noise and sound collage. The term was originally coined in 1976 by Monte Cazazza and Throbbing Gristle, with the founding of Industrial Records. Other early industrial musicians include NON and Cabaret Voltaire. By the late 1970s, additional artists emerged such as Clock DVA, Nocturnal Emissions, Einstürzende Neubauten, SPK, Nurse with Wound, and Z’EV, alongside Whitehouse who coined the subgenre "power electronics" which became a key influence on contemporary noise music.

=== Japanese noise music ===
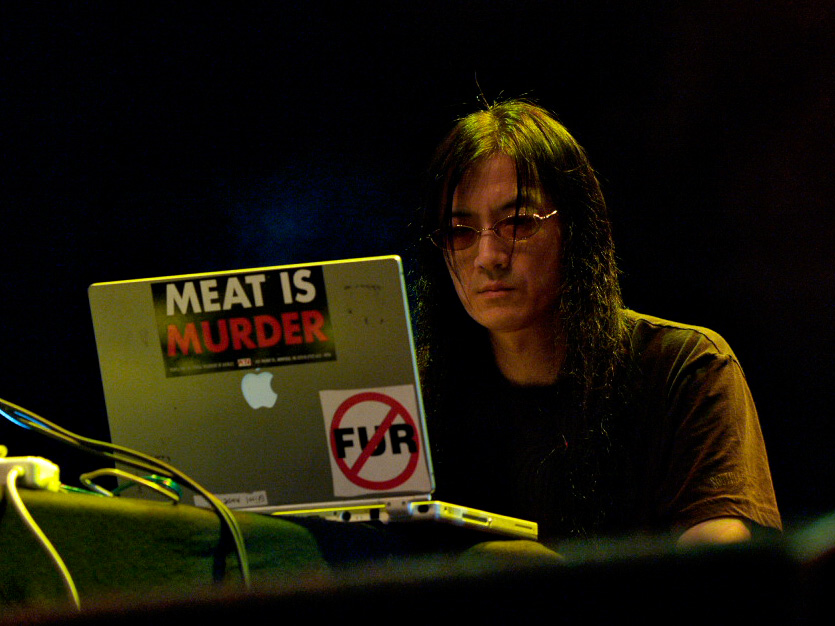
Merzbow, prominent Japanoise musician, in 2007

Since the early 1980s, Japan has produced a significant output of characteristically harsh artists and bands, sometimes referred to as Japanoise, with names such as Government Alpha, Alienlovers in Amagasaki and Koji Tano, and perhaps the best known being Merzbow (pseudonym for the Japanese noise artist Masami Akita who himself was inspired by the Dada artist Kurt Schwitters's Merz art project of psychological collage). In the late 1970s and early 1980s, Akita took Metal Machine Music as a point of departure and further abstracted the noise aesthetic by freeing the sound from guitar based feedback alone. According to Hegarty (2007), "in many ways it only makes sense to talk of noise music since the advent of various types of noise produced in Japanese music, and in terms of quantity this is really to do with the 1990s onwards ... with the vast growth of Japanese noise, finally, noise music becomes a genre". Other key Japanese noise artists that contributed to this upsurge of activity include Hijokaidan, Boredoms, C.C.C.C., Incapacitants, KK Null, Yamazaki Maso's Masonna, Solmania, K2, the Gerogerigegege and Hanatarash. Nick Cain of The Wire identifies the "primacy of Japanese Noise artists like Merzbow, Hijokaidan and Incapacitants" as one of the major developments in noise music since 1990.

=== Power noise ===
Power noise (also known as rhythmic noise, rhythm 'n' noise and distorted beat music) is a subgenre of noise and post-industrial music, that originated predominantly in Europe during the 1990s. It draws primary influence from various styles of electronic dance music.

=== Harsh noise ===
Harsh noise is a subgenre of noise music that emerged in the early 1980s, originating from the Japanese noise music scene and the European power electronics movement.

=== Brooklyn noise ===
The Brooklyn noise scene (or simply Brooklyn noise) was an American underground noise music scene which emerged in the 2000s in Brooklyn, New York. It was spearheaded by acts such as Black Dice and Wolf Eyes. By the late 2000s, acts such as Oneohtrix Point Never and Emeralds infused the scene with "'70s cosmic trance music and '80s new age".

=== Post-noise ===
Post-noise is a music genre and scene that emerged in the 2000s related to hypnagogic pop, new-age and hauntology. The term was featured in writer David Keenan's 2009 article Childhood's End in issue 306 of the British music magazine The Wire where he coined the term hypnagogic pop. Musician Daniel Lopatin described the style as a move away from "macho" noise music.

=== Ambient noise wall ===
Ambient noise wall (also known as ANW and lowercase noise wall) is a subgenre of noise music that is heavily inspired by the characteristics of harsh noise wall music, but with softer and sparse textures. Notable artists within this genre include Karl T's solo project Missing Girls, with his work being released on the HarshFuckedForLife label.

== Compilations ==
- An Anthology of Noise & Electronic Music Volumes 1–7 Sub Rosa, Various Artists (1920–2012)
- The Japanese-American Noise Treaty (1995) CD, Relapse
- New York Noise hour music video television program

== See also ==
- Chiptune – Style of synthesized electronic music
- Circuit bending – Modification of an electronic device to create an instrument
- Colors of noise – Power spectrum of a noise signal
- Death growl – Vocal style in music
- List of noise musicians
- List of Japanoise artists
- Lo-fi music – Music aesthetic
- Noise in music – Unpitched, indeterminate, uncontrolled, loud, unmusical, or unwanted sound
- Screaming (music) – Vocal technique used in music
- Sound mass – Concept in musical composition
- Sonorism – Movement in Western classical music
- Sonic artifact – Audible defect generated during the recording or editing of a sound

== Bibliography ==
- Whiteley, Sheila; Rambarran, Shara (2016). The Oxford Handbook of Music and Virtuality. Oxford: Oxford University Press. ISBN 978-0-19-932128-5.
- Graham, Stephen (2016). Sounds of the Underground: A Cultural, Political and Aesthetic Mapping of Underground and Fringe Music. Ann Arbor, Michigan: University of Michigan Press. ISBN 978-0-472-11975-2.
