= Field recording =

Audio recording produced outside a recording studio

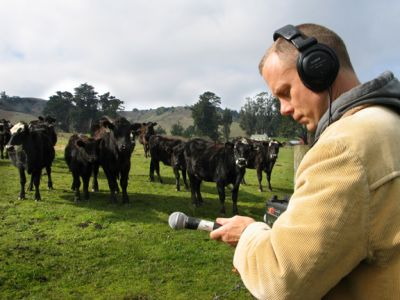
Martin Schmidt of the American electronic duo Matmos, recording cows in 2006

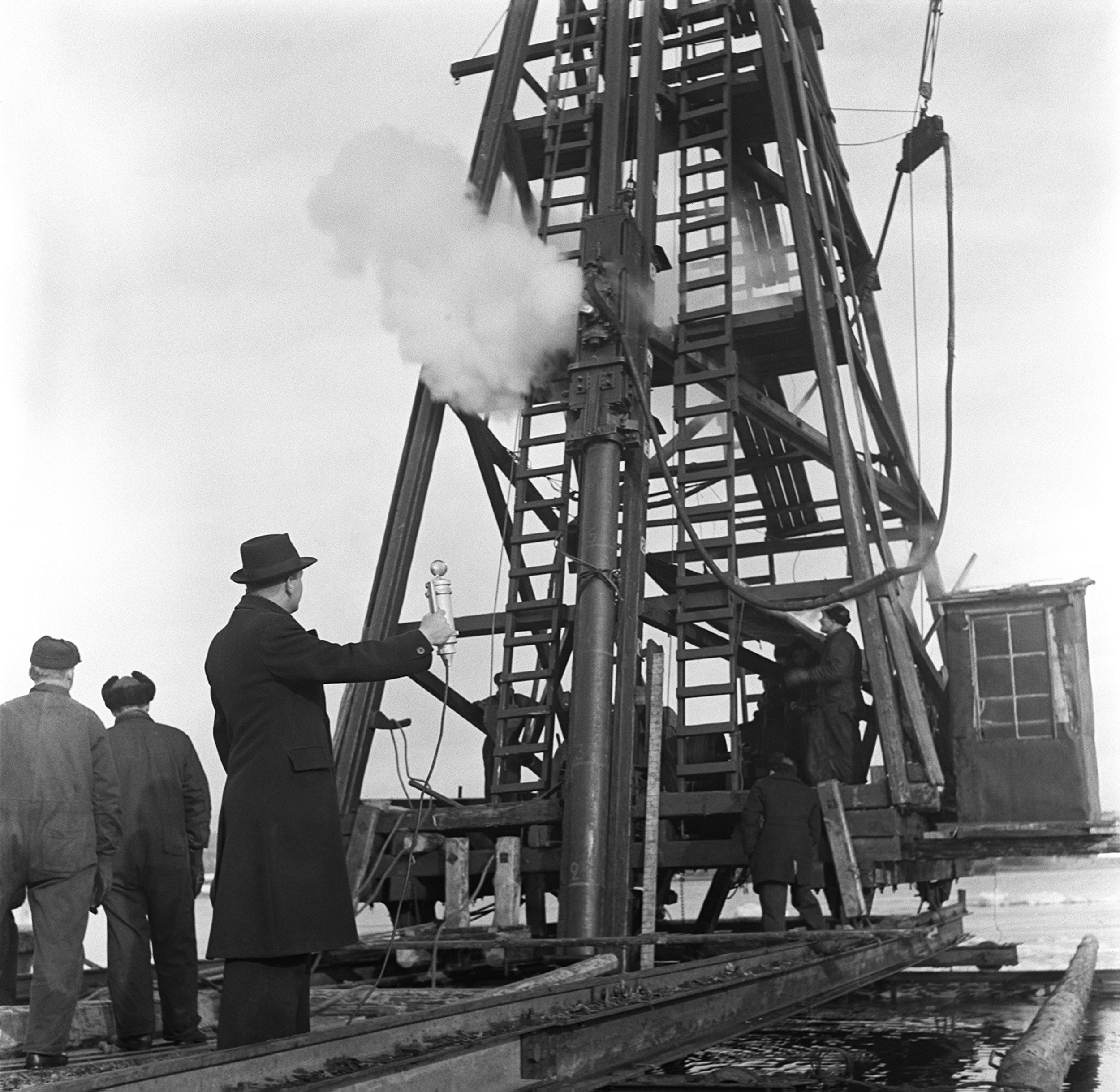
A recording being made of a colliery whistle

Field recording is the production of audio recordings outside recording studios, and the term applies to recordings of both natural and human-produced sounds. It can also include the recording of electromagnetic fields or vibrations using different microphones like a passive magnetic antenna for electromagnetic recordings or contact microphones, or underwater field recordings made with hydrophones to capture the sounds and/or movements of whales, or other sealife. These recordings are often regarded as being very useful for sound designers and foley artists.

Field recording of natural sounds, also called phonography (a term chosen because of the similarity of the practice to photography), was originally developed as a documentary adjunct to research work in the field, and Foley work for film. With the introduction of high-quality, portable recording equipment, it has subsequently become an evocative artform in itself. In the 1970s, both processed and natural phonographic recordings, (pioneered by Irv Teibel's Environments series), became popular.

"Field recordings" may also refer to simple monaural or stereo recordings taken of musicians in familiar and casual surroundings, such as the ethnomusicology recordings pioneered by John Lomax, Nonesuch Records, and Vanguard Records.

== Techniques ==
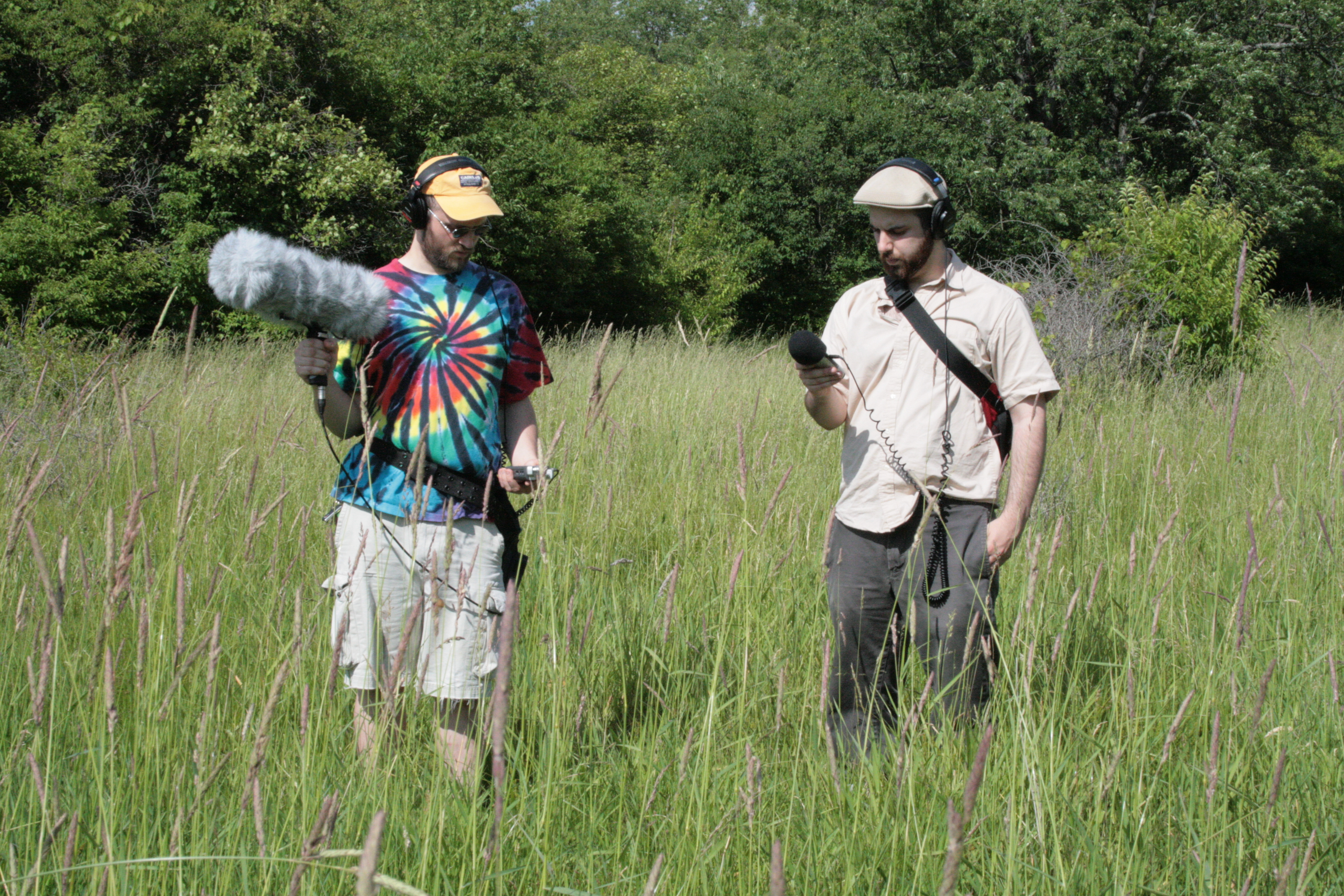
Two individuals recording ecoacoustics in the field.

=== General ===
Field recording often involves the capture of ambient noises that are low level and complex, and, in response, the requirements from the field recordist have often pushed the technical limits of recording equipment, that is, demanding low noise and extended frequency response in a portable, battery-powered unit. For this reason, field recordists have favoured high-quality (usually professional) recorders, microphones, and microphone pre-amplifiers. The history of the equipment used in this area closely tracks the development of professional portable audio recording technology. Modern accessories used in the field include, but are not limited to: windscreens (foam, fur, hair, parabolic reflector), shock mounts, microphone cables, digital audio recorders and so on.

Field recording is typically recorded in the same channel format as the desired result, for instance, stereo recording equipment will yield a stereo product. In contrast, a multitrack remote recording captures many microphones on multiple channels, later to be creatively modified, augmented, and mixed down to a specific consumer format.

Field recording experienced a rapid increase in popularity during the early 1960s, with the introduction of high-quality, portable recording equipment, (e.g., the Uher, and Nagra portable reel-to-reel decks). The arrival of the DAT (Digital Audio Tape) in the 1980s introduced a new level of audio recording fidelity with extended frequency response and low self-noise. In addition to these technologies, other popular means for field recording have included the analog cassette (CAC), the DCC (Digital Compact Cassette), and the MiniDisc. The latest generation of recorders are completely digital-based (hard disk/Flash). It is also possible to use personal electronic devices, (e.g., a smartphone or tablet), with software, to do field recording and editing.

In addition to recording and editing, the process of field recording also involves these skills. Ability to monitor (observe the relevant signals to ensure recording and settings are correct), control levels (correct decibel range and headroom), create neat documentation (handling, annotating, and tagging the recorded material), clean up (cutting out unwanted noises, processing, etc.), and file management.

=== Basic techniques ===
There are three basic techniques that involve the placement of field recording microphones which result in varying directionality. The three techniques are known as A/B, X/Y, and M/S.

==== A/B ====
A/B is known as a spaced pair. A/B, or the spaced pair is formed by setting two separate microphones (omnidirectional) in parallel with one another. There is intentional space left between the two microphones in order to capture a wide stereo image of a desired sound. This technique is often utilized in an indoor recording of multi-string instrumental settings, music ensembles, and so on.

==== X/Y ====
X/Y is the most frequently used stereo recording technique. It typically involves setting a complement pair of microphones in a coincident (XY) pattern. This technique uses two cardiod microphones - the capsules are usually placed very close one above the other usually at an angle of between 90 and 120 degrees. It is quite a common configuration for handheld portable field recorders. It relies on the variation in level of sound arriving at each microphone. It produces a very acceptable stereo image for playback over speakers. However, there is a downside to this technique, as it is fixed in the way that widening or shrinking to control the ambiance is not a possibility.

==== M/S ====
Unlike X/Y, the M/S technique was created to allow for control over the level of ambiance. The logic behind it is that the Mid microphone functions as a center channel, and the Side microphone adds additional ambiance that can either be intensified or subtracted. This can take place either live during the recording or afterwards during editing.

Physically the layout involves a directional microphone as the centre, with a figure-of-eight microphone placed 90-degrees horizontally off-axis to the mid microphone. The figure-of-eight microphone can be used after the recording to provide information to widen the stereo image by combining the + and - phases of this microphone with the mid microphone. Basically the 180˚ signals can be added or subtracted from the centre signal to provide a wide stereo image - if no signal is supplied from the side microphone the recording will simply be a mono recording from the mid microphone.

=== New techniques ===
Newly developed techniques include the creative placement of microphones, (including contact microphones and hydrophones, for example), the diffusion of captured sounds, and individual approaches.

== Career ==
A field recordist is an individual that works to produce field recordings. Typically the work involves recording sound outside of a controlled environment like a studio (field recording is an analog of studio recording), to be used or repurposed as sound effects that get inserted into all sorts of media, such as plays, video games, sound art, soundwalks, films, and television shows. A career as a professional field recordist is a tough, but potentially rewarding one. A field recordist must often face ever-changing weather, be patient, and willing to capture sounds in potentially dangerous locations. A typical day could range from recording ambient noise in a library to recording the thundering sounds of a grand waterfall. Just as the recordings can vary, the amount of work can as well. Most typically work as freelancers with other side jobs to support the slow periods of recording.

== Brief early history of field recordings ==
The earliest known field recording is of a Shama bird. It was recorded in 1889 by Ludwig Koch using a wax cylinder recording. This was the first documented recording of a non-human subject. The distinction between whether field recordings are art or music is still ambiguous, as they still serve both purposes. Some early proponents of this important, yet unknown field consist of examples like Walter Ruttman's Weekend (which was a radio piece put together from recording of daily life in Berlin), and Ludwig Koch's 'sound-books' (which educated listeners in species identification using gramophone records of birdsong). These field recordings and many others ended up being stored in vinyl to be sold to enthusiasts, hobbyists, and tourists alike a few decades later in the 1950s, 60s, and 70s.

== Research ==
=== Ethnomusicology ===
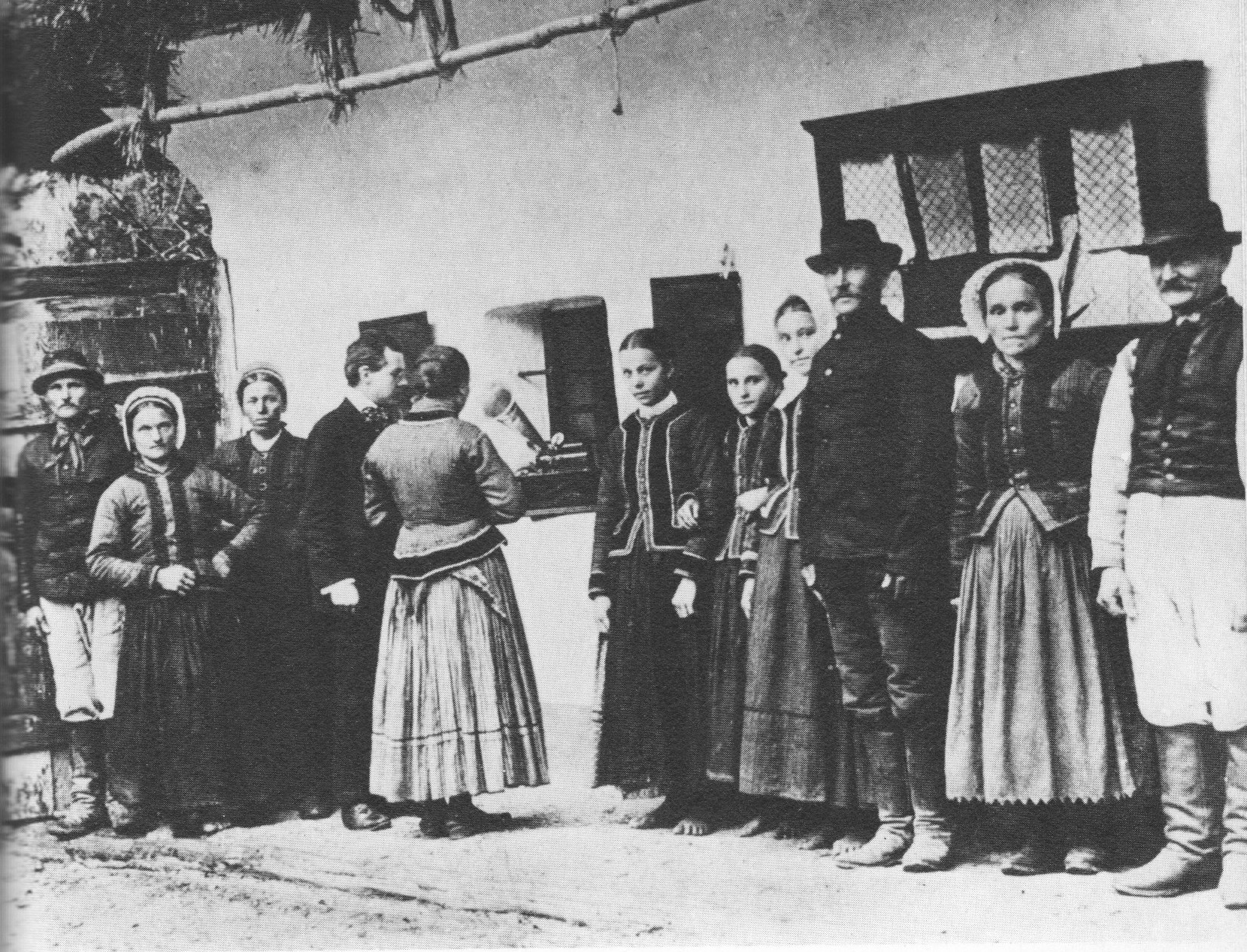
Béla Bartók using a phonograph to record Slovak folk songs sung by peasants

Field recording was originally a way to document oral presentations and ethnomusicology projects (pioneered by Béla Bartók, Charles Seeger, and John Lomax). In the case of Bartók, his own studies helped alter the generally unfavorable view of Eastern European folk music at that time. He grew to admire numerous regional styles from both firsthand experience and recordings, eventually incorporating these styles into his own compositional works.

=== Bioacoustics ===
Field recording is an important tool in bioacoustics and biomusicology, most commonly in research on bird song. Animals in the wild can display very different vocalizations from those in captivity. Ambient noise in urban environments have also shown to alter the vocalizations of local bird populations.

Field recordings have shown that whales were less stressed and generally more healthy following the COVID-19 pandemic, due to a large decline in international commerce and naval shipping.

== Art ==
=== Music ===
The use of field recordings in avant-garde, musique concrète, experimental, and, more recently, ambient music was evident almost from the birth of recording technology. Most noteworthy for pioneering the conceptual and theoretical framework with art music that most openly embraced the use of raw sound material and field recordings was Pierre Schaeffer, who was developing musique concrète as early as 1940. Further impetus was provided by the World Soundscape Project, initiated by Canadian composer R. Murray Schafer in the 1970s; this work involved studying the acoustic ecology of a particular location by the use of field recordings.

Field recordings are now a common source material for a range of musical results, from contemporary musique concrète compositions to film soundtracks, video game soundtracks, and effects. Chris Watson, formerly of Cabaret Voltaire, is now perhaps the world's leading exponent of this art, with his recordings used for David Attenborough's series for the BBC, programmes for BBC Radio, and many other outlets. Another notable application of field recordings as of contemporary music is its inclusion in some vaporwave tracks, commonly recordings of public areas such as malls or grocery stores to add atmosphere.

Another example of the use of field recordings is by the American musician Stuart Hyatt who combines his field recordings with the experimental music of himself and other musicians.

The sounds recorded by any device, and then transferred to digital format, are used by some musicians through their performance with MIDI-interfaced instruments. A contemporary artist with great success for his compositions is Christian Fennesz.

Earlier innovators who are noted for the importance and boldness of their projects are Luigi Russolo, who, in 1913, with his manifesto, L'arte dei rumori (The Art of Noises), gave musical value to environmental noise. He also designed and built the Intonarumori—the first instruments for making noise. Francesco Balilla Pratella utilized the Intonarumori in his opera, L'aviatore Dro, which was written in close collaboration with Filippo Tommaso Marinetti, (the founder of the Futurist movement).

=== Radio documentary ===
Radio documentaries often use recordings from the field, e.g., a locomotive engine running, for evocative effect. This type of sound functions as the non-fictional counterpart to the sound effect.

=== Politics ===
During the early years of commercial recordings, the speeches of politicians sold well, since few people had radios. The His Master's Voice catalogue for 1914–1918 lists over a dozen such records. Probably the last time such records sold well was in 1965, when the LP, The Voice of Churchill, reached number 7 in the UK albums chart. This was immediately after Churchill's death.

== See also ==
- Biomusic
- Lowercase
- The Freesound Project
- Sound art
- Soundscape
- Sound map
