= Russolo =

Russolo is a surname. Notable people with the surname include:

- Antonio Russolo (1877–1942), Italian composer, brother of Luigi
- Luigi Russolo (1885–1947), Italian painter, composer, builder of experimental musical instruments, and author
