= Antonio Russolo =

- Born: Antonio Russolo; 1877; Portogruaro, Italy
- Died: 1943 (aged 65–66)
- Genres: Futurism, experimental, avant-garde, noise
- Occupations: Composer, Custom instrument builder

Antonio Russolo (1877–1943) was an Italian Futurist composer and the brother of the more famous Futurist painter, composer and theorist Luigi Russolo. He is noted for composing pieces made with the intonarumori and, together with his brother, introduced The Art of Noises.

== Biography ==
Russolo was the son of Domenico Russolo who was a clockmaker as well as a piano and organ tuner. The family moved to Latisana when Domenico became the director of the town's Philharmonic School and the Schola Cantorum. Antonio learned music early through his father, who successfully prepared him and another brother, Giovanni, to pass the entrance exam at the Milan Conservatory. He completed a degree in piano and organ.

=== The Art of Noises ===
Russolo helped his brother Luigi construct noise-intoning intonarumori instruments in line with the noise music manifesto that Luigi released called The Art of Noises. This Futurist musical concept, which was introduced by F.T. Marinetti, sought to avoid imitating the sound of everyday life by stylizing sonic materials so that it loses its original sense; acquiring a new aural sphere in the process. It opposed the philosophy behind the Late Romanticism, which favored the reproduction of reality.

Several compositions by Russolo that included the intonarumori are considered hybrid. These were pieces based on traditional instrumentation and modified to include the noise music machines. A record made by Russolo in 1921 is the only surviving sound recording that features the original intonarumori. It includes the pieces, Corale and Serenata, which combined conventional orchestral music set against the famous noise machines. This music was released in 1924 on a 78 rpm record. In these pieces, Russolo used the intonarumori as underlay. The sounds made are described as tunes disrupted by growls and low-pitched electrical interference. In the same year, Russolo's compositions were conducted during a concert organized by F.T. Marinetti at the Théâtre des Champs-Élysées. The program included four of Russolo's work along with two compositions of Nuccio Fiorda. The use of the noise intoners were acclaimed by critics such as Sergei Prokofiev, Sergei Diaghilev, Leonide Massine, and Piet Mondrian.

== Recordings ==
- Corale, Serenata by Antonio Russolo and Luigi Russolo (1924) were published on cassette in 1988 in the Audio By Visual Artists edition of Tellus Audio Cassette Magazine #21 and are archived on the internet at Ubuweb

== See also ==
- Musica Futurista: The Art of Noises
