= R. Henry Nigl =

- Born: April 16, 1944; Saginaw, Michigan
- Died: February 6, 2023 (aged 78); Waterville, Maine
- Other names: Henry Nigl, Richard Henry Nigl, Dick Leaman, G.H.Diel
- Known for: Performance Art, Visual Arts, Design

Richard Henry Nigl is perhaps best known for a series of performances generally characterized as "Shout Art". Nigl created these works improvisationally in the late 1970s.

== Career ==
These "Shouts" consist of quasi-poetic performances typically ending in a startling shouted word or phrase. The general format of "Shouts" addresses a lineage with Dadaism and Futurism. Since 1961, in addition to performances and site specific installations and work within traditional media, his recent work has focused on digital imaging and the internet as an environment for art.

== See also ==
- The Art of Noises (L'arte dei Rumori), Luigi Russolo The Art of Noises
