= Mechanical Ballet =

Mechanical Ballet may refer to:

- Mechanical Ballet, a 1931 ballet by Adolph Bolm set to the composition Iron Foundry by Alexander Mosolov
- "Mechanical Ballet", a song from the 1992 opera The Voyage by Philip Glass
- Ballet Mécanique, a 1924 project by the American composer George Antheil and the filmmaker/artists Fernand Léger and Dudley Murphy
