= Alexander Mosolov =

Russian composer (1900–1973)

- Александр Мосоло́в
- Alexander Mosolov in the 1950s
- Born: Alexander Vasilyevich Mosolov; 11 August 1900; Kiev, Russian Empire (now Kyiv, Ukraine)
- Died: 11 July 1973 (aged 72); Moscow, Russian SFSR, Soviet Union
- Known for: Composition
- Notable work: Iron Foundry
- Movement: Futurism, Noise music

Alexander Vasilyevich Mosolov (Note: Mosolov's name is transliterated variously and inconsistently between sources. Alternative spellings of Alexander include Alexandr, Aleksandr, Aleksander, and Alexandre; variations on Mosolov include Mossolov and Mossolow (as in German).) (Russian: Алекса́ндр Васи́льевич Мосоло́в, romanized: Aleksandr Vasilyevich Mosolov; 11 August [O.S. 29 July] 1900 – 11 July 1973) was a Soviet-era Russian composer known for his early futurist orchestral music, piano sonatas, and vocal music. A Moscow Conservatory graduate, his piece now called Iron Foundry (1926) gained international fame.

Under Stalinism, Mosolov adhered to Soviet realism, composing with Kyrgyz and Turkmen folk music. Conflicts with authorities led to his expulsion from the Union of Soviet Composers (1936), a Gulag term (1937) reduced by professors' intervention, and lifelong loss of stature.

His output includes five piano sonatas (four extant), two piano concertos (the second incomplete), two cello concertos, a harp concerto, four string quartets, twelve orchestral suites, eight symphonies, and many choral and voice pieces.

== Early life ==
Mosolov was born to an upper-middle-class family in Kiev, in the Russian Empire. His mother, Nina Alexandrovna, was a professional singer at the Bolshoi Theater and a graduate of the Kiev school of music, and she gave Mosolov his first musical lessons. The family moved to Moscow in 1904. Mosolov's father, Vasiliy Alexandrovich, died a year later when Mosolov was five years old. After his father's death, Mosolov's mother married a successful painter and teacher, Mikhail Leblan. Young Mosolov was greatly impacted by the cosmopolitan lifestyle into which he was raised; both German and French were spoken in the home and the family took trips to Berlin, Paris, and London.

Mosolov attended high school until 1916, and in 1917 worked in the office of the People's Commissioner for State Control. Through this, he personally delivered mail to Vladimir Lenin three times, which had a profound impact on the young Mosolov. At the start of the Bolshevik Revolution, Mosolov volunteered in the Red Army's First Cavalry Regiment and fought on the Polish and Ukrainian fronts. He received the Order of the Red Banner on two occasions. He suffered from post-traumatic stress disorder due to the war and was medically discharged in July 1921.

== Musical career ==
Mosolov entered the Moscow Conservatory, where he studied under Reinhold Glière until 1925; in that year he began composition studies under Nikolai Myaskovsky. He also studied piano under Grigoriy Prokofiev and Konstantin Igmunov. He graduated from the Conservatory in 1925 after presenting his graduation piece, the cantata Sphynx, based on the Oscar Wilde poem of the same name. That same year, he was granted membership in the Association for Contemporary Music (ACM).

Mosolov in 1927

Despite forays into composition, Mosolov's primary emphasis at this time was with performance, as he was an accomplished pianist. After the performance of his First String Quartet at the Frankfurt Festival of the International Society for Contemporary Music (ISCM) on 30 June 1927 was met with critical acclaim, Mosolov shifted his focus to composition. He was appointed secretary of the Russian section of the ISCM in 1927 and 1928. In 1928 and 1929, Mosolov was commissioned by the Bolshoi Theater to compose a futurist imagination of what Moscow would be like in 2117 for a speculative ballet called The Four Moscows. Leonid Polovinkin, Anatoly Alexandrov, and Dmitri Shostakovich were also involved, each to compose Moscow in 1568, 1818, and 1918 respectively, but nothing ever came of the project.

After the onset of socialist realism as the official aesthetic of the Soviet Union in 1932, Mosolov traveled to Central Asia, where he researched and collected samples of Turkmen, Tajik, Armenian, and Kyrgyz songs. Mosolov became the first composer to create a symphonic suite on a Turkmen folk song. His settings of folk songs were met with criticism from Soviet arbiters. Rather than simply set the melodies in an orchestral setting, Mosolov used dense textures and polytonality that disregarded the style of socialist realism. In 1932 and in desperation, he wrote a letter to Joseph Stalin pleading for Stalin's influence. In his letter, Mosolov wrote, "Since 1926, I am an object of permanent badgering. Now, this has become insufferable. I must compose, and my works must be performed! I must test my works against the masses; if I come to grief, I'll know where I must go." He went further to ask for Stalin to "influence the proletarian musicians and their myrmidons, who have badgered me during the whole last year, and to allow me to work in the USSR" or "authorize my departure abroad, where I, with my music, could be more useful for the USSR than here, where I am harassed and badgered, where I'm not allowed to display my forces, to test myself." (Note: "Я терплю травлю с 1926 года. Сейчас я больше ждать не хочу. Я должен сочинять и исполняться! Я должен проверять свои сочинения на массе; пусть это будут провалы, но я увижу, куда мне идти и как мне перестраиваться." (Since 1926, I am an object of permanent badgering. Now, this has become insufferable. I must compose, and my works must be performed! I must test my works against the masses; if I come to grief, I'll know where I must go.) "1. Либо воздействовать на ВАПМ и подвапмовцев в смысле прекращения моей травли, тянущейся уже целый год, и дать мне возможность работать в СССР. 2. Либо дать мне возможность уехать за границу, где я своей музыкой принесу гораздо больше пользы СССР. Чем здесь у нас, где меня гонят, травят, не дают возможность выявлять свои силы и проверять себя." (Either influence the proletarian musicians and their myrmidons, who have badgered me during the whole last year, and to allow me to work in the USSR or authorize my departure abroad, where I, with my music, could be more useful for the USSR than here, where I am harassed and badgered, where I'm not allowed to display my forces, to test myself.))

On February 4, 1936, Mosolov was expelled from the Composers' Union for treating waiters poorly and taking part in a drunken brawl in Press House, a local restaurant. After this, Mosolov traveled voluntarily to the Turkmen and Uzbek republics to collect folk songs as a form of rehabilitation. His attempts were unsuccessful, and he was arrested on November 4, 1937, for alleged counter-revolutionary activities under Article 58, Paragraph 10 of the Soviet criminal code and sentenced to eight years in the Gulag. He served in the prison from December 23, 1937, until August 25, 1938. Glière and Myaskovsky had sent a letter to Mikhail Kalinin, the chairman of the Central Executive Committee of the Russian Soviet Federative Socialist Republic, arguing for Mosolov's release citing his turn towards realism, his "outstanding creative ability," and the fact that neither teacher had seen in Mosolov any anti-Soviet disposition. On July 15, 1938, Mosolov's sentence was commuted to a five-year exile—he could not live in Moscow, Leningrad, or Kiev until 1942. His quick release, having only served eight months of his eight-year sentence, was possible because he had been imprisoned not on political charges but on an overblown accusation of "hooliganism" brought by Mosolov's enemies in the Composers' Union.

When World War II broke out, Mosolov composed Signal, an opera which dealt with the war. However, the compositions of Mosolov's later life were so uncharacteristic of his earlier style that one scholar noted that it was "impossible to discern the former avant-gardist in the works written from the late thirties onward". Mosolov lived in Moscow and continued to compose until his death in 1973.

== Musical style ==
Mosolov's earliest music implies that Mosolov was influenced by German romanticism, but this influence waned as he began studying under Myaskovsky and Glière. In an early piece, "Four Songs," Op. 1, Mosolov explored the use of ostinato. Widespread use of ostinato became the defining signature of Mosolov's music: Iron Foundry is built of many ostinati working in tandem to create the sound of a factory and is used in the Second and Fifth Piano Sonatas, etc.

Dissonance "in the extreme" and chromaticism are also Mosolov's signatures, though he stops short of the structured twelve-tone technique of Arnold Schoenberg. Instead of tone rows, Mosolov uses thickly clustered, heavily chromatic chords to make his point. Folk music also saw use by Mosolov. As the first composer of a symphonic suite on a Turkmen folk song, Mosolov adopted the use of folk music before it was mandated under Socialist realism. His Second Piano Sonata incorporated Kyrgyz melodies, and his "Three Children's Scenes" used a city street song. However, instead of carefully setting the music for orchestra, Mosolov handled the music "like thematic grist for his compositional mill." This use of folk tunes continued after his Stalinist "rehabilitation." However, Mosolov's early works were marked by dense textures and polytonality, which was lost after his expulsion and persecution.

== Works ==
Among Mosolov's more notable pieces are his Four Newspaper Announcements and Three Children's Scenes, written in 1926. In Four Newspaper Announcements, Mosolov set four brief reports in the newspaper Izvestiya to music. The topics of the four short pieces range from a lost dog to the declaration of a name change. In contrast, the text to Three Children's Scenes was written by Mosolov himself, and is much darker. The first, called "Mama, give me a needle, please!" is a short song in which the protagonist tortures a cat; the singer even mimics the screams of the cat, and the song ends with a sung shout of "A wicked creature!"

Mosolov's most famous composition, Iron Foundry, was originally the final movement of a ballet suite titled Steel (1926-1927), "written for the revolution's tenth-anniversary celebrations". The work premiered in Moscow on December 4, 1927, in a concert held by the ACM to commemorate the anniversary. Its Western debut was at the ISCM festival in Liège on September 6, 1930, and it came to America two months later when the Cleveland Symphony Orchestra held a performance. Although it was originally praised as "a mighty hymn to machine work" and as a piece that glorified industrialization and "the worker", as the years passed the piece began to receive criticism from increasingly conservative Soviet authorities. Some critics argued that the workers, ironically enough, didn't enjoy such music, while others argued that the workers, "for whom machine oil is mother's milk," were roused and inspired by music of their time. One critic found in the music "no organized will to victory, in fact very little besides the petty-bourgeois anarchy", while conceding that it was "striving to find an individual idiom"; another called it a "grossly formalistic perversion of a contemporary topic". Today, only Iron Foundry remains from Steel: the manuscripts were lost in 1929, the same year that Mosolov came under increased fire from Soviet authorities.
