= Iron Foundry =

Orchestral work by Alexander Mosolow

Factory: machine-music (Russian: Завод: музыка машин, Zavod: muzyka mashin), Op. 19, commonly referred to as the Iron Foundry, is the most well-known work by Soviet composer Alexander Mosolov and a prime example of Soviet futurist music. It was composed between 1926 and 1927 as the first movement of the ballet suite Stal ("Steel"). The remaining movements of Steel, "In Prison," "At the Ball," and "On the Square" have been lost, and Iron Foundry is performed today as a standalone orchestral episode.

== History ==
Iron Foundry is a product of its time. After the Russian Revolution of 1917, romantic music—though not banned—fell from prominence as it was a remnant of the deposed ruling class, and experimental and revolutionary ideas flourished. In 1923, the Association for Contemporary Music was founded for avant-garde composers. Mosolov, his teacher Nikolai Myaskovsky, Dmitri Shostakovich, and other composers joined. Iron Foundry was originally composed for the ballet Stal with a scenario by Inna Chernetskaya. Stal was never staged; instead Iron Foundry was presented as the first movement of an orchestral suite from the ballet, premiered in Moscow on December 4, 1927, in a concert by the Association for Contemporary Music commemorating the tenth anniversary of the Russian Revolution. The same concert featured Shostakovich's Second Symphony, Nikolai Roslavets' cantata October, and Leonid Polovinkin's Prologue. Mosolov's composition was performed at the eighth International Society for Contemporary Music festival in Liège on September 6, 1930, where it was critically acclaimed. One critic said of the piece, "We have ... a kind of lyrical theme, the song of steel, or possible of man, the ironmaster. ... [I]t is an essentially musical idea carried out with convincing skill, and as a concluding piece to an orchestral programme it deserves to become popular."

At the Hollywood Bowl in 1931, Iron Foundry was used as the music to Adolph Bolm's ballet, The Spirit of the Factory—known also as Ballet mécanique (not to be confused with the 1924 composition by George Antheil), Mechanical Ballet, and The Iron Foundry—which opened to "rousing ovations, rapturous reviews, and popular demands" for an encore performance. This was the first time Iron Foundry was performed for a stage performance, although it was never staged as originally intended.

Conducted by Julius Ehrlich, the Orchestre Symphonique de Paris performed an early recording of the piece in 1934 for Columbia, who released it as a 78rpm record with the name Steel Foundry.

Metallica performed the piece with the San Francisco Symphony Orchestra, Michael Tilson Thomas conducting, during their S&M2 concerts at Chase Center, San Francisco on September 6 and 8, 2019.

== Instrumentation ==
Iron Foundry is scored for piccolo, two flutes, two oboes, English horn, two clarinets, bass clarinet, two bassoons, contrabassoon, four horns, three trumpets, two trombones, bass trombone, and tuba, timpani, snare drum, bass drum, cymbals, tam-tam, iron sheet, and strings.

== Analysis ==
The piece is written in ternary form. It begins with an allegro section, consisting of brief chromatic figures across the orchestra that build slowly to a trio section, after which it returns to the feeling of the allegro beginning for the coda. In this way Mosolov "coordinates the mechanistic rhythms into specific orchestral groups that work together like cogs in a well-oiled machine." Mosolov uses a live orchestra to create a factory-like sound, unlike Antheil's Ballet mécanique, which uses mechanical elements to reach its musical goals.

=== Introduction ===
The piece begins as a representation of the start of the machine, with a tam-tam stroke and repetitious figures that begin in a few instruments and, measure by measure, are added to the sound until the instruments join together to suggest the sound of a factory at work. By measure twenty-seven, the overlapping instruments create a deliberate and machine-like sound above which the horns are directed to stand and play the main theme of the piece.

=== Trio ===
At the trio, the machine suddenly shuts down. Upper winds and the snare drum push forward to a syncopated exchange between the low brass and upper winds and marked by the bass drum and tam-tam. This gives way to a steady, march-like timpani motif that drives the orchestra back to the atmosphere of the beginning.

Iron Foundry
Transition from trio to coda. Performed by the Royal Concertgebouw Orchestra; Riccardo Chailly, conductor

=== Coda ===
Now the machine has returned to full power. Musical ideas from the introduction are reintroduced, and the piccolo and iron sheet are added to the texture. Some performances, including those of the Interlochen Arts Academy and Royal Concertgebouw Orchestra, interpret the iron sheet part (see figure) as both for iron sheet and orchestral anvil, with anvil strikes on every beat as indicated by the vertical accents; however, the conductor's score published by Kalmus includes a note that the sheet is to be vibrated at each vertical accent and for the sheet to vibrate naturally between beats. The last ten measures of the piece accelerate and grow louder until the penultimate measure, where most of the instrumentation drops away. The horn and trumpet play a brief figure and the full orchestra returns to end the piece with a sforzando stab.

== See also ==
- Pacific 231, a 1923 orchestral piece by Arthur Honegger
- Ballet mécanique, a 1924 piece by George Antheil
- Alexander Mosolov
- Russian Futurism
- Futurism
- Suprematism
- Russian Constructivism
