= Luciano Chessa =

Italian composer

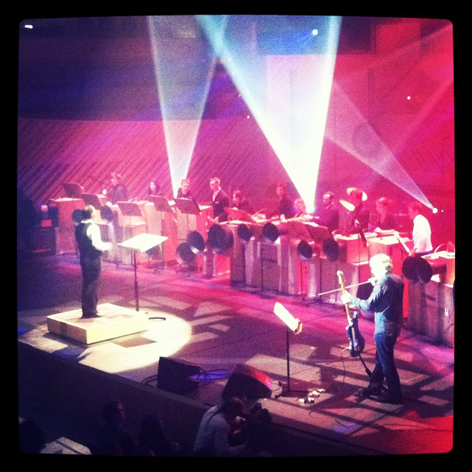
Luciano Chessa conducting the premiere of "It All Begins Now" by Lee Ranaldo, with Lee Ranaldo and the New World Symphony. A Performa Commission, New World Center, Miami Beach, December 2011.

Luciano Chessa (born 12 January 1971, in Sassari, Italy) is a musician, performance/visual/installation artist, and musicologist.

As a composer, conductor, pianist, and musical saw / Vietnamese dan bau soloist, Luciano Chessa has been active in Europe, the U.S., Australia, and South America. Compositions include a piano and percussion duet after Pier Paolo Pasolini's "Petrolio", written for Sarah Cahill and Chris Froh and presented in 2004 at the American Academy in Rome, "Il pedone dell’aria" ("air walker") for orchestra and double children's choir, premiered in 2006 at the Auditorium of Turin's Lingotto and subsequently released on DVD, and two works in collaboration with artist Terry Berlier: "Louganis" for piano and TV/VCR combo (performed at the Monday Evening Concerts in 2010) and "Inkless Imagination IV" for viola, mini-bass musical saw, turntables, piano, percussion, FM radios, blimp and video projection (premiered at UC Davis' Mondavi Center by the Empyrean Ensemble).

Among his compositions should be mentioned a large orchestral work commissioned by the Orchestra Filarmonica di Torino, Italy and titled "Ragazzi incoscienti scarabocchiano sulla porta di un negozio fallito an.1902" (reckless children scribble on the door of a failed shop in 1902), "Movements", a multimedia work for 16mm film, dan bau and amplified film projectors produced in collaboration with filmmaker Rick Bahto, "Come un’infanzia", a guitar plus string quartet piece for the Left Coast Chamber Ensemble, and A Heavenly Act, an opera commissioned by SFMOMA and Opera Parallèle with a libretto by Gertrude Stein and video by Kalup Linzy. A Heavenly Act premiered on 19 August 2011, at the Yerba Buena Center for the Arts in San Francisco, in a staged production by the Ensemble Parallèle, conducted by Nicole Paiement and featuring Linzy.

Recent premieres include "LIGHTEST", a SFMOMA commission presented on 16 November 2013, at the SF Columbarium, and "Set and Setting", a San Francisco Contemporary Music Players commission presented on 18 February 2014, at the Yerba Buena Center for the Arts. Chessa's first record, "Humus" (1997), was released on the Italian label Destination X. His "Peyrano", which includes recordings produced in the 90s, has been re-released in March 2012 by the Swiss label Skank Bloc Records.

From the year 1999 to 2004, he has been a member of the UC Davis Gospel Choir, where he served as assistant conductor to Calvin Lymos, the choir's principal director.

As a musicologist, his areas of research competence include twentieth-century, experimental, and late fourteenth-century music (Ars Subtilior). His research on Italian Futurism, which he has presented and published internationally, has shown for the first time the occult relationship between Luigi Russolo's intonarumori and Leonardo da Vinci's mechanical noisemakers. He is author of Luigi Russolo Futurist. Noise, Visual Arts, and the Occult, the first monograph ever to be dedicated to Russolo and The Art of Noises. Published by the University of California Press, the book has received enthusiastic reviews:

"With meticulous attention to primary sources, galvanised by daring leaps of imagination, [Chessa] reveals an array of unorthodox ideas, creative tensions, and contradictions within Russolo's milieu." [...] "Chessa's prose embodies the sheer pleasure of discovery through research." [...] "The frenzied pace of Chessa's writing retains a visionary edge throughout, and the book itself could be seen as an example of synthesis and dynamism." (The Wire, June 2012)

"The most comprehensive source of Russolo available in English." (Examiner.com)

"In Luigi Russolo, Futurist: Noise, Visual Arts, and the Occult, composer and San Francisco Conservatory music history professor Luciano Chessa reconstructs Russolo’s life through ambitious archival research, uncovering and digesting esoteric and obscure texts to reverse-engineer how the artist’s eccentric interests influenced his creative output." (Brainpickings.org)

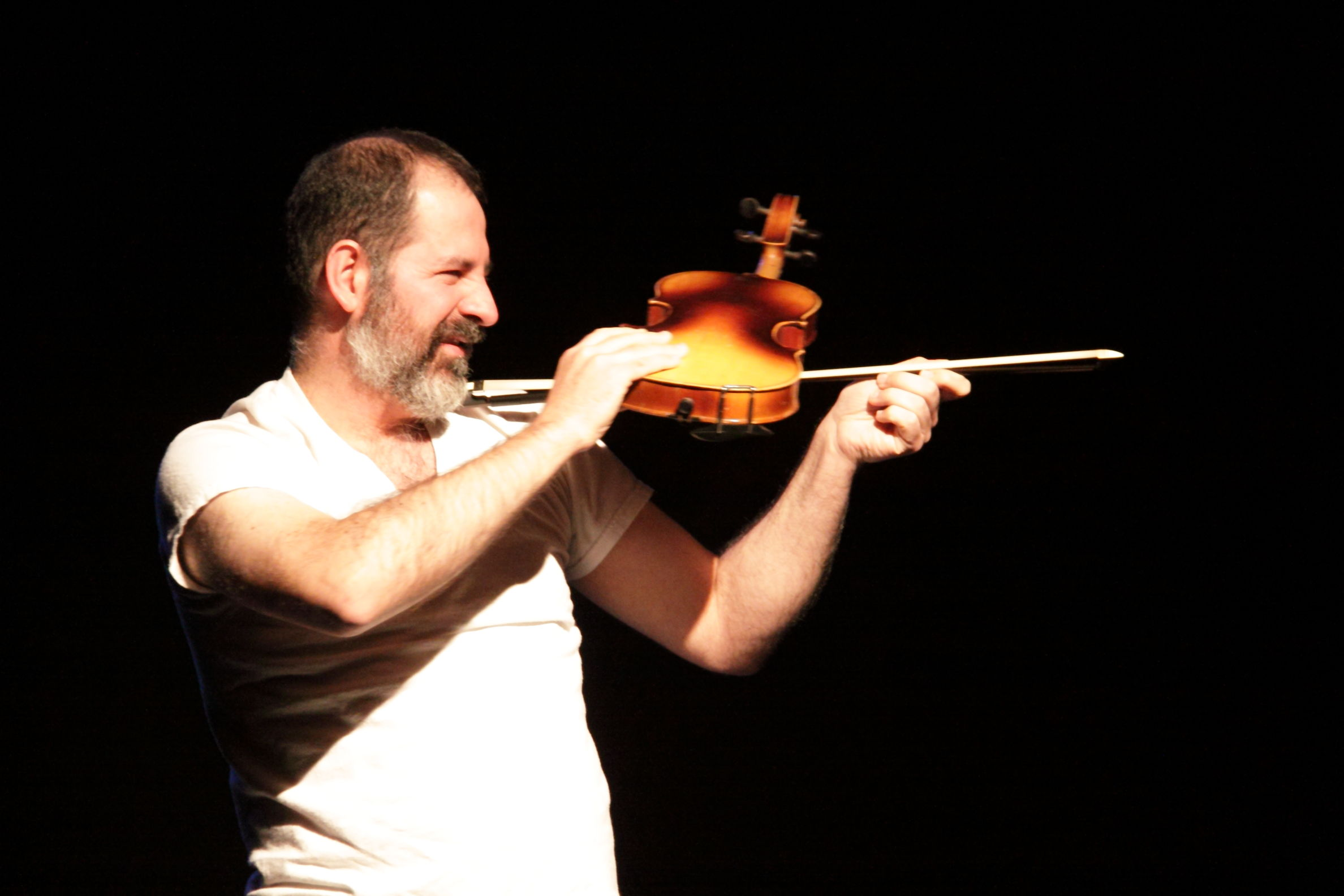
Chessa performing at the Fluxus Semicentennial in San Francisco in 2011

In 2018, he wrote a brief essay on Russolo's ongoing importance in contemporary music for the first ever Argentinean translation of Luigi Russolo's "L'arte dei Rumori", published in 2018 by Dobra Robota Editora. He was also the main guest in the launching of said book in Buenos Aires in December 2017. Chessa's Futurist expertise has resulted in an invitation by RoseLee Goldberg, General Director of the New York-based Biennale of the Arts PERFORMA to direct the first reconstruction project of Russolo's earliest intonarumori orchestra, and to curate concerts of music specifically commissioned for this orchestra. The new intonarumori ensemble has been unveiled in October 2009 at San Francisco's YBCA's Novellus Theater and then presented in NYC's Town Hall in November for PERFORMA 09—both events being co-produced by PERFORMA and SFMOMA, and featuring Minna Choi's Magik*Magik Orchestra. This production presented an impressive array of world premieres written by such composers and ensembles as Blixa Bargeld, John Butcher, Tony Conrad, James Fei, Ellen Fullman, Ghostdigital with Finboggi Petusson and Caspar Electronics, Nick Hallett, Carla Kihlstedt + Matthias Bossi, Ulrich Krieger, Joan La Barbara, Pauline Oliveros, Pablo Ortiz, Mike Patton, Anat Pick, Elliott Sharp, Jennifer Walshe, Theresa Wong, Text of Light. The production, also featuring Chessa's L’acoustique ivresse, for bassvoice and intonarumori ensemble and the modern premiere of Russolo's Risveglio di una città in a new diplomatic edition by Chessa, was hailed by The New York Times among the best events in the arts of 2009. In September 2010 Chessa presented the intonarumori in the first Italian appearance: a concert at the MART in Rovereto, Italy, as part of the Festival Transart, which featured performances by Nicholas Isherwood and included Sylvano Bussotti's "VARIAZIONE RUSSOLO-Slancio d'angoli", and two new commissioned pieces by Margareth Kammerer and Teho Teardo. In March 2011 Chessa conducted the Orchestra of Futurist Noise Intoners in a sold-out concert for Berliner Festspiele MaerzMusik Festival, which included "Gramophone Saraswati," a new piece by Amelia Cuni and Werner Durand. The Orchestra of Futurist Noise Intoners is currently touring internationally. In December 2011 Chessa conducted the project with the New World Symphony in their new Frank Gehry designed New World Center's Concert Hall packed to capacity as part of a Performa-curated special event to celebrate the tenth anniversary of Art Basel | Miami Beach. The performance included Joan La Barbara's "Striations" and the premiere of Lee Ranaldo's "It All Begins Now (Whose Streets? Our Streets!)". Both pieces featured their respective composers performing alongside Chessa and the New World Symphony. In May 2013 at the Experimentation Center of the Teatro Colón in Buenos Aires he presented a series of events to celebrate the Centennial of Russolo's Art of Noises. A double LP dedicated to the Orchestra of Futurist Noise Intoners and documenting the first phase of this project has been released on the label Sub Rosa in November 2013.

In 2010, Luciano Chessa was interviewed by the BBC about Luigi Russolo's. Chessa serves in the advisory board of TACET, the international research publication dedicated to Experimental Music of the University of Paris 1 Pantheon-Sorbonne. His music is published by RAI TRADE, the Italian National Broadcast Channels' music publishing company, and Edizioni Carrara.

== Education ==
He holds a D.M.A. in Piano performance and a M.A. in composition from the Conservatorio Giovanni Battista Martini in Bologna, Italy, a M.A. magna cum laude in History of Medieval Music from the University of Bologna, and a PhD in Musicology and Music Criticism from the University of California at Davis. He taught and lectured at numerous institutions including St. John's College of Oxford, UK, Columbia University, Harvard University, Sydney's and Melbourne's Conservatories and Universities, the Conservatory of Music in Bologna, UC Davis, UC Berkeley, Stanford University, and EMPAC in the campus of Rensselaer Polytechnic Institute.

== See also ==
- Futurists and Theosophy
