= Dynamism of a Car =

Painting by Luigi Russolo

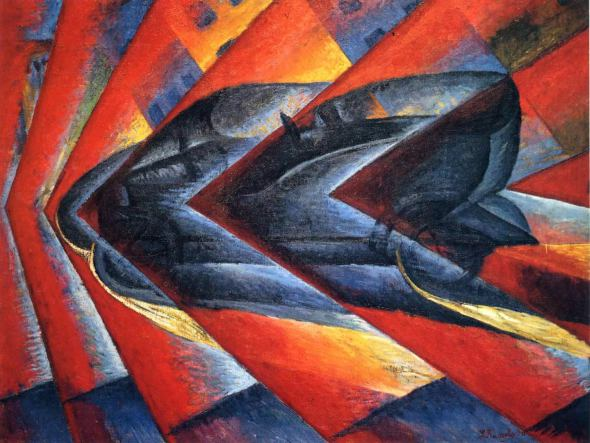
- Artist: Luigi Russolo
- Year: 1913
- Medium: oil on canvas
- Dimensions: 139 cm × 184 cm (55 in × 72 in)
- Location: Musée National d'Art Moderne, Paris

Dynamism of a Car (Italian: Dinamismo di un' automobile) is a 1913 Futurist painting by Italian artist Luigi Russolo. It is currently held in the Musée National d'Art Moderne.

== Analysis ==
The painting's fragmentation and reassembly of an aerodynamic car into triangles suggest Cubist influences. Horizontally stacked red arrows indicate the direction of the car's motion. The compression of the arrows on the left also suggests that the car is moving at an extremely high speed. Due to its focus on speed and machinery, Dynamism of a Car exemplifies the Futurist style expounded in Filippo Tommaso Marinetti's Manifesto of Futurism.
