= Francesco Balilla Pratella =

Italian composer

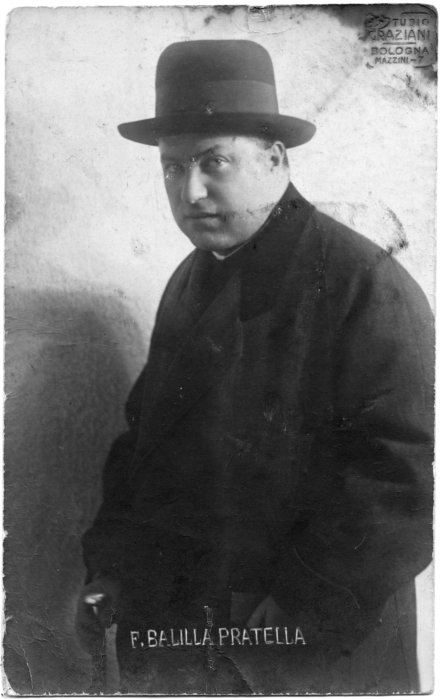
Francesco Balilla Pratella, ca. 1912

Francesco Balilla Pratella (Lugo, Italy February 1, 1880 – Ravenna, Italy May 17, 1955) was an Italian composer, musicologist and essayist. Although he was one of the leading advocates of Futurism in Italian music, much of Pratella's own music betrays little obvious connection to the views espoused in the manifestos he authored.

== Biography ==
Born in Lugo, and deeply impressed by the folk-music he heard in his childhood in his native Romagna (now part of Emilia-Romagna), Pratella entered Pesaro Conservatory and studied with Vincenzo Cicognani and Pietro Mascagni. Pratella's professional career was largely centered in teaching and musicology; he served as director of the Liceo Musicale in Lugo from 1910 until 1927, when he accepted a post as director of the Istituto G. Verdi in Ravenna, where he remained until his retirement in 1945. His interest in collecting Romagna's folksongs began before his futurist period and continued after, intensifying later through Pratella's arrangements of folksongs and training of choruses. Pratella also made modern performance arrangements of early polyphonic music. From 1921 to 1925 Pratella headed the Bologna-based music publication Il Pensiero Musicale.

An early project drawn from Pratella's interest in indigenous folksong was the opera La Sina d'Varguõn (1909), which attracted the attention of Filippo Tommaso Marinetti, the father of Italian futurism. Pratella joined the futurist group in 1910 and became one of its most ardent activists, publishing three tracts which were combined into the pamphlet Musica Futurista in 1912. Inspired by Pratella, Luigi Russolo created his Intonarumori (Noise Intoners) in 1913 and wrote his own manifesto, The Art of Noises (1913), introducing the futurist concept of introducing noise into music. Pratella was less than enthusiastic about the use of Intonarumori, but he agreed to utilize their resources in his opera L'aviatore Dro (1911–1914) which was written in close collaboration with Marinetti. At the end of World War I, Pratella broke with the futurists; L'aviatore Dro opened in 1920 and proved popular with critics and audiences alike, but its impracticality and odd storyline doomed it to certain obscurity.

In his later years, Pratella occasionally turned his attention to composing for films, notably in Mother Earth (1931) and L'argine (1938). He also worked on a proposed Raccolta nazionale delle musiche italiane (National Collection of Italian Music) with Gabriele D'Annunzio, but the project was interrupted by the poet's death.

== Manifesti ==
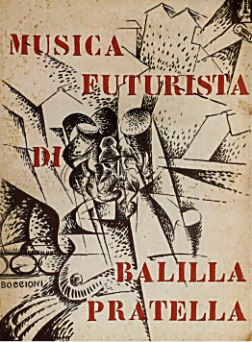
Cover of the 1912 edition of Musica futurista by Francesco Balilla Pratella – cover art by Umberto Boccioni

According to Pratella, Italian music was inferior to music abroad. He praised the "sublime genius" of Wagner and saw some value in the work of Richard Strauss, Debussy, Elgar, Mussorgsky, Glazunov and Sibelius. By contrast, the Italian symphony was dominated by opera in an "absurd and anti-musical form". The conservatories encouraged backwardness and mediocrity. The publishers perpetuated mediocrity and the domination of music by the "rickety and vulgar" operas of Puccini and Umberto Giordano. The only Italian Pratella could praise was his teacher Mascagni, because he had rebelled against the publishers and attempted innovation in opera, but even Mascagni was too traditional for Pratella's tastes.

In the face of this mediocrity and conservatism, Pratella unfurled "the red flag of Futurism, calling to its flaming symbol such young composers as have hearts to love and fight, minds to conceive, and brows free of cowardice". He did so via several short manifestos, a key example of which was Musica futurista (Manifesto of Futurist Musicians), published in 1910.

The main ideas of his musical manifestos were:

- for the young to keep away from conservatories and to study independently;
- the founding of a musical review, to be independent of academics and critics;
- abstention from any competition that was not completely open;
- liberation from the past and from "well-made" music;
- for the domination of singers to end, so that they became like any other member of the orchestra;
- for opera composers to write their own librettos, which were to be in free verse;
- to end all period settings, ballads, "nauseating Neapolitan songs and sacred music"; and
- to promote new work in preference to old.

== Style and influence ==
The Italian futurist music manifestos, particularly Russolo's, have long been an inspiration to avant-garde musicians and continue to be so in the twenty-first century. However, mid-twentieth century scholars—among a small fraternity who had access to Pratella's long-forgotten compositions—were deeply critical of Pratella owing to a perceived streak of conservativism in his own music which, they felt, undermined the revolutionary spirit of his manifesti. As Benjamin Thorn put it, "[Pratella]'s compositions never quite lived up to the rhethoric." In Italy, however, Pratella's fortunes have been improving. Pianist Daniele Lombardi has recorded some of Pratella's futurist piano music, and in 1996 the La Scala opera house in Milan revived L'aviatore Dro for the first time in 75 years. The success of this production and other factors have helped to revitalize Pratella's futurist profile in his home country.

Although he composed seven operas, Pratella was not a particularly prolific composer. In addition to his futurist works, operas and folk choruses, he left a small but respectable output of chamber music, piano music, sacred music and songs. Pratella' s cycle of symphonic poems based on the folk music of Romagna are well respected in Italy, and place Pratella among Italy's "Generation of 1880," composers such as Ottorino Respighi, Gian Francesco Malipiero and Ildebrando Pizzetti who eschewed opera in favor of instrumental music.

== Selective list of works ==
As the author:

- Manifesto of Futurist Musicians (Manifesto dei musicisti futuristi) (1910)
- Technical Manifesto of Futurist Music (Manifesto tecnico della musica futurista) (1911)
- The Destruction of Squareness (Distruzione della quadratura) (1912)
- Shouts, Songs, Chants and Dances of the Italian People (1919)
- Etnofonia di Romagna (Udine, 1938)
- Primo documentario per la storia dell'etnofonia in Italia (1941)
- Saggio di comparazione etnofonica (1943)
- Autobiografia (Milan, 1971)

As the composer:

- La Sina d'Varguõn, opera (1909)
- Suite per Organo, for organ (1912)
- Musica futurista, for orchestra, op. 30 (1912)
- L'aviatore Dro, opera (1911–1914)
- La guerra, for piano (1913)
- Trio, op. 28 (1919)
- Per un dramma orientale, incidental music for a Marinetti play (1922)
- Il rondo di Vittoria (1932; revision of La guerra)
- La ninna nanna della bambola, children's opera, op. 44
- Dono primaverile, children's opera, op. 48
- Il fabbricatore di Dio, op. 46
- Romagna, symphonic poem
- La chiesa di Polenta, symphonic poem
- I Paladini di Francia, sacred music
- Le canzoni del niente, chamber work
- Cante Romagnole, for chorus
- Giorno di festa, for piano

== See also ==
- Futurism (music)
