= Futurism (music) =

20th-century movement in music

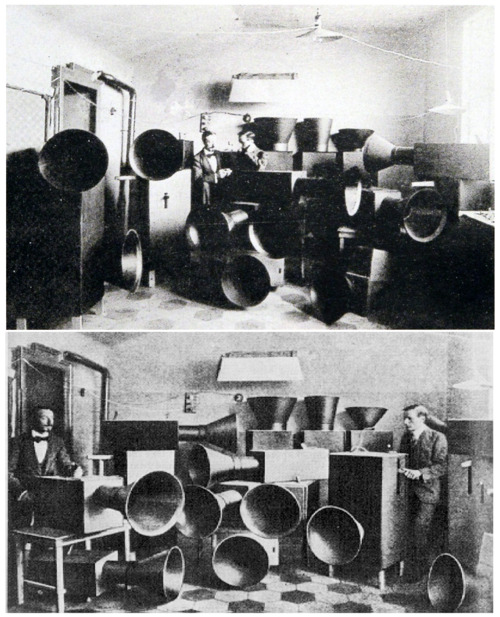
Luigi Russolo, intonarumori, 1913

Futurism was an early 20th-century art movement which encompassed painting, sculpture, poetry, theatre, music, architecture, cinema and gastronomy. Filippo Tommaso Marinetti initiated the movement with his Manifesto of Futurism, published in February 1909. Futurist music rejected tradition and introduced experimental sounds inspired by machinery, and influenced several 20th-century composers. According to Rodney Payton, "early in the movement, the term 'Futurism' was misused to loosely define any sort of avant-garde effort; in English, the term was used to label a composer whose music was considered 'difficult'."

== Pratella's Manifesto of Futurist Musicians ==
The musician Francesco Balilla Pratella joined the movement in 1910 and wrote the Manifesto of Futurist Musicians (1910), the Technical Manifesto of Futurist Music (1911) and The Destruction of Quadrature (Distruzione della quadratura), (1912). In The Manifesto of Futurist Musicians, Pratella appealed to the young, as had Marinetti, because only they could understand what he had to say. He boasted of the prize that he had won for his musical Futurist work, La Sina d’Vargöun, and the success of its first performance at the Teatro Comunale at Bologna in December 1909, which placed him in a position to judge the musical scene. According to Pratella, Italian music was inferior to music abroad. He praised the "sublime genius" of Wagner and saw some value in the work of Richard Strauss, Debussy, Elgar, Mussorgsky, Glazunov and Sibelius. By contrast, the Italian symphony was dominated by opera in an "absurd and anti-musical form". The conservatories encouraged backwardness and mediocrity. The publishers perpetuated mediocrity and the domination of music by the "rickety and vulgar" operas of Puccini and Umberto Giordano. The only Italian Pratella could praise was his teacher Pietro Mascagni, because he had rebelled against the publishers and attempted innovation in opera, but even Mascagni was too traditional for Pratella's tastes.

In the face of this mediocrity and conservatism, Pratella unfurled "the red flag of Futurism, calling to its flaming symbol such young composers as have hearts to love and fight, minds to conceive, and brows free of cowardice".

His musical programme was:

- for the young to keep away from conservatories and to study independently;
- the founding of a musical review, to be independent of academics and critics;
- abstention from any competition that was not completely open;
- liberation from the past and from "well-made" music;
- for the domination of singers to end, so that they became like any other member of the orchestra;
- for opera composers to write their own librettos, which were to be in free verse;
- to end all period settings, ballads, "nauseating Neapolitan songs and sacred music"; and
- to promote new work in preference to old.

== Russolo and the intonarumori ==
Luigi Russolo (1885–1947) was an Italian painter and self-taught musician. In 1913 he wrote The Art of Noises, Russolo and his brother Antonio used instruments they called "intonarumori", which were acoustic noise generators that permitted the performer to create and control the dynamics and pitch of several different types of noises. The Art of Noises classified "noise-sound" into six groups:

1. Roars, Thunderings, Explosions, Hissing roars, Bangs, Booms
2. Whistling, Hissing, Puffing
3. Whispers, Murmurs, Mumbling, Muttering, Gurgling
4. Screeching, Creaking, Rustling, Humming, Crackling, Rubbing
5. Noises obtained by beating on metals, woods, skins, stones, pottery, etc.
6. Voices of animals and people, Shouts, Screams, Shrieks, Wails, Hoots, Howls, Death rattles, Sobs

Russolo and Marinetti gave the first concert of Futurist music, complete with intonarumori, in April 1914 (causing a riot). The program comprised four "networks of noises" with the following titles:

- Awakening of a City
- Meeting of cars and aeroplanes
- Dining on the casino terrace
- Skirmish in the oasis.

Further concerts around Europe were cancelled due to the outbreak of the First World War.

== Composers influenced by Futurism ==
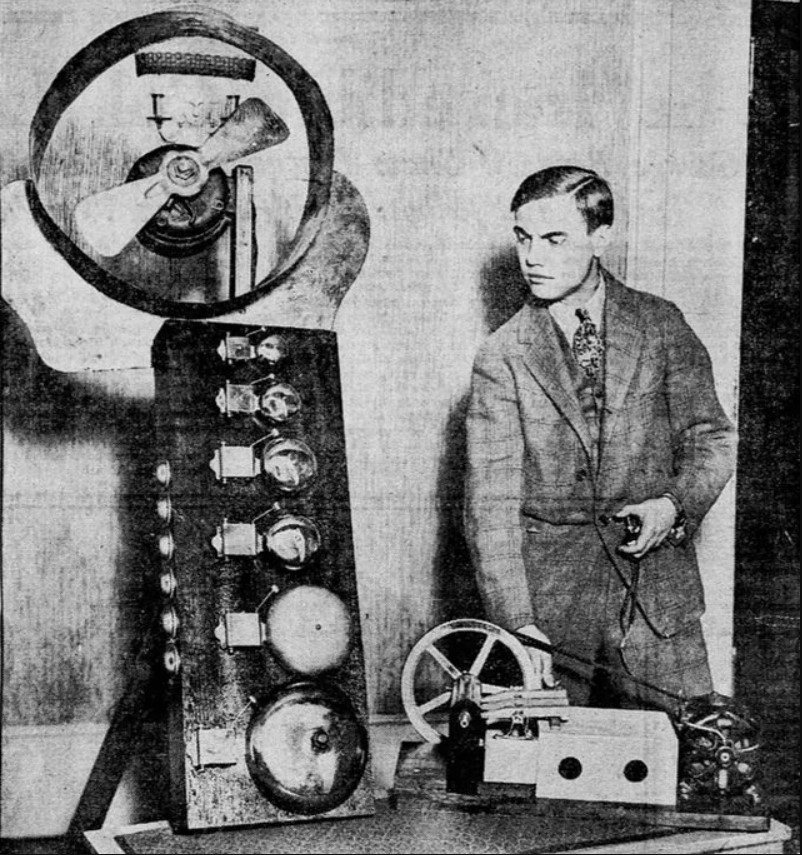
George Antheil with one of his noise-making devices in the 1920s.

Futurism was one of several 20th century movements in art music that paid homage to, included or imitated machines. Ferruccio Busoni has been seen as anticipating some Futurist ideas, though he remained wedded to tradition. Russolo's intonarumori influenced Igor Stravinsky, Arthur Honegger, George Antheil, and Edgar Varèse.

The composer George Antheil is particularly notable in this respect. He expressed the artistic radicalism of the 1920s in music, causing him to be embraced by Dadaists, Futurists and modernists. His fascination with machinery is evident in his Airplane Sonata, Death of the Machines, and the 30-minute Ballet mécanique. The Ballet mécanique was originally intended to accompany an experimental film by Fernand Léger, but the musical score is twice the length of the film and now stands alone. The score calls for a percussion ensemble consisting of three xylophones, four bass drums, a tam-tam, three airplane propellers, seven electric bells, a siren, two "live pianists", and sixteen synchronized player pianos. Antheil's piece was the first to synchronize machines with human players and to exploit the difference between what machines and humans can play.

Russian Futurist composers included Arthur-Vincent Lourié, Mikhail Gnesin, Alexander Goedicke, Geog Kirkor (1910–1980), Julian Krein (1913–1996), and Alexander Mosolov.

== See also ==
- Modernist music
- 1920s in music
- 1930s in music
