= Ugo Piatti =

Italian painter

Ugo Piatti (1888 in Milan – 1953) was an Italian painter and instrument maker, best known for collaborating on the construction of the intonarumori with Luigi Russolo.

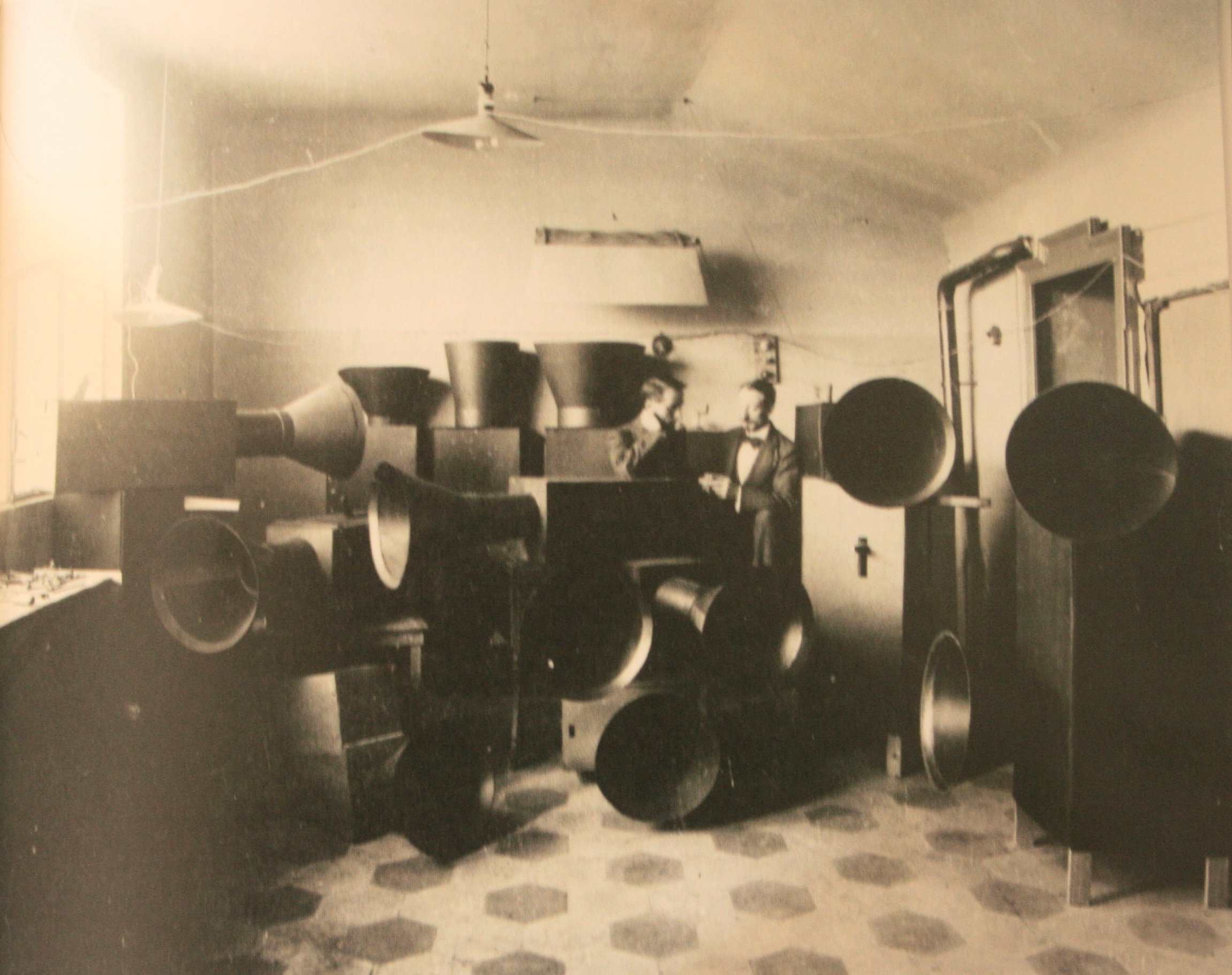
Russolo and his assistant Ugo Piatti in their Milan studio in 1913 with the Intonarumori (noise machines)

Piatti enrolled at the Brera Academy in 1903 and came into contact with the group of Milanese Futurist artists in the early years of the next decade, collaborated with Luigi Russolo on creating Intonarumori (noise-making machines) and making his debut at the Famiglia Artistica Milanese in 1911. Piatti accompanied Filippo Tommaso Marinetti on his trips to London, Paris and Prague after World War I. His involvement with the Novecento Italiano art movement through Margherita Sarfatti in the 1920s saw his paintings taking on simpler handling of volume and a focus on landscape, views of Milan and still-life depictions of flowers. He exhibited work at the Venice Biennale's 14th Esposizione Internazionale d'Arte in 1924 and in Milan at the first and second shows of the Novecento Italiano group (1926 and 1929). One of his works was bought for the Galleria d'Arte Moderna, Milan, in 1935 and a solo exhibition was held at the Galleria Pesaro in 1938.

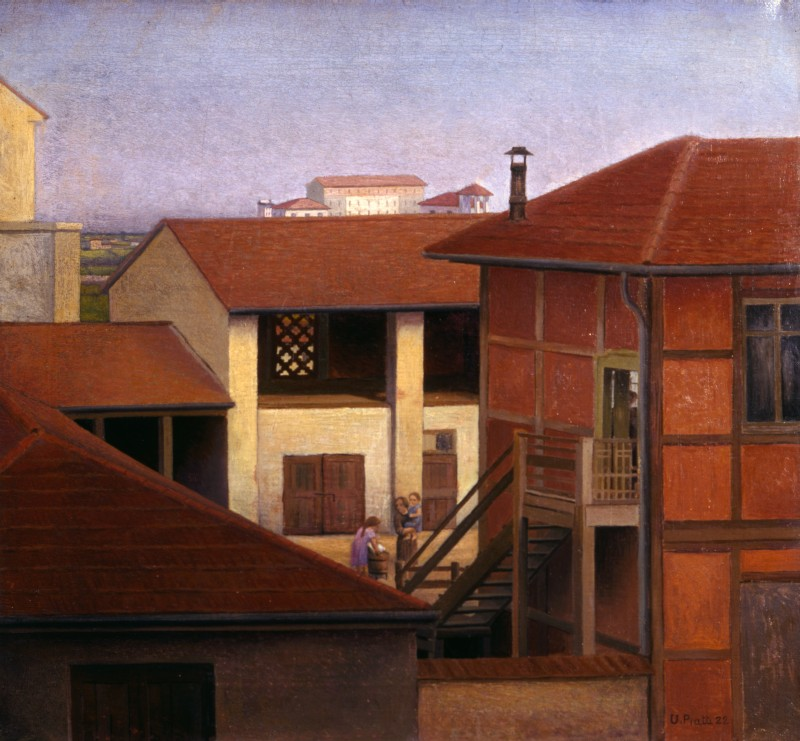
Paesaggio, 1922 (Art collections of Fondazione Cariplo)

== Other projects ==
Media related to Ugo Piatti at Wikimedia Commons
