= The Art of Noises =

Futurist music manifesto

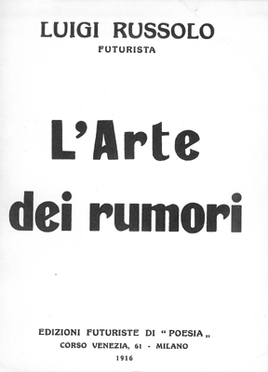
Cover of Luigi Russolo's L'arte dei rumori, published in book form in 1916

The Art of Noises (Italian: L'arte dei Rumori) is a Futurist manifesto written by Luigi Russolo in a 1913 letter to friend and Futurist composer Francesco Balilla Pratella. In it, Russolo argues that the human ear has become accustomed to the speed, energy, and noise of the urban industrial soundscape; furthermore, this new sonic palette requires a new approach to musical instrumentation and composition. He proposes a number of conclusions about how electronics and other technology will allow futurist musicians to "substitute for the limited variety of timbres that the orchestra possesses today the infinite variety of timbres in noises, reproduced with appropriate mechanisms".

The Art of Noises is considered by some authors to be one of the most important and influential texts in 20th-century musical aesthetics.

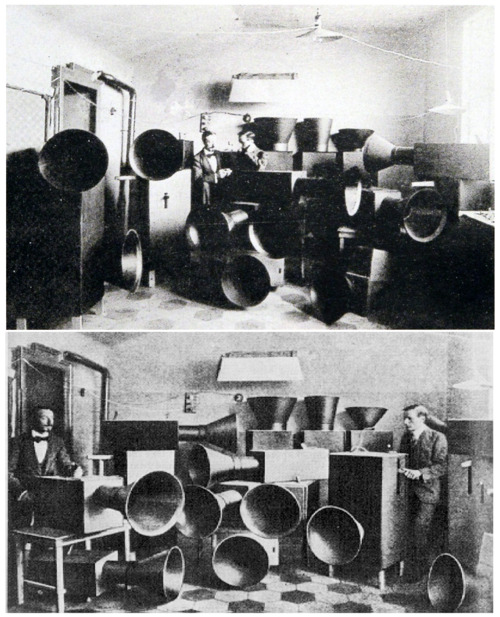
Intonarumori instruments built by Russolo and Ugo Piatti, photo published in Russolo's 1913 book The Art of Noises

== The evolution of sound ==
Russolo's essay explores the origins of man-made sounds.

=== Ancient life was all silence ===
Russolo states that "noise" first came into existence as the result of 19th century machines. Before this time the world was a quiet, if not silent, place. With the exception of storms, waterfalls, and tectonic activity, the noise that did punctuate this silence were not loud, prolonged, or varied.

=== Early sounds ===
He notes that the earliest "music" was very simplistic and was created with very simple instruments, and that many early civilizations considered the secrets of music sacred and reserved it for rites and rituals. The Greek musical theory was based on the tetrachord mathematics of Pythagoras, and featured very limited use of harmony. Developments and modifications to the Greek musical system were made during the Middle Ages, which led to music like Gregorian chant. Russolo notes that during this time sounds were still narrowly seen as "unfolding in time." The chord did not yet exist.

=== The complete sound ===
Russolo refers to the chord as the "complete sound," the conception of various parts that make and are subordinate to the whole. He notes that chords developed gradually, first moving from the "consonant triad to the consistent and complicated dissonances that characterize contemporary music." He notes that while early music tried to create sweet and pure sounds, it progressively grew more and more complex, with musicians seeking to create new and more dissonant chords. This, he says, comes ever closer to the "noise-sound" typical of noise music.

=== Musical noise ===
Russolo compares the evolution of music to the multiplication of machinery, pointing out that our once desolate sound environment has become increasingly filled with the noise of machines, encouraging musicians to create a more "complicated polyphony" in order to provoke emotion and stir our sensibilities. He notes that music has been developing towards a more complicated polyphony by seeking greater variety in timbres and tone colors.

=== Noise-Sounds ===
Russolo explains how "musical sound is too limited in its variety of timbres." He breaks the timbres of an orchestra down into four basic categories: bowed instruments, metal winds, wood winds, and percussion. He says that we must "break out of this limited circle of sound and conquer the infinite variety of noise-sounds," and that technology would allow us to manipulate noises in ways that could not have been done with earlier instruments.

=== Future sounds ===
Russolo claims that music has reached a point that no longer has the power to excite or inspire. Even when it is new, he argues, it still sounds old and familiar, leaving the audience "waiting for the extraordinary sensation that never comes." He urges musicians to explore the city with "ears more sensitive than eyes," listening to the wide array of noises that are often taken for granted, yet (potentially) musical in nature. He feels this noise music can be given pitch and "regulated harmonically," while still preserving irregularity and character, even if it requires assigning multiple pitches to certain noises.

The variety of noises is infinite. If today, when we have perhaps a thousand different machines, we can distinguish a thousand different noises, tomorrow, as new machines multiply, we will be able to distinguish ten, twenty, or thirty thousand different noises, not merely in a simply imitative way, but to combine them according to our imagination.

== Six Families of Noises for the Futurist Orchestra ==
Russolo sees the futurist orchestra drawing its sounds from "six families of noise":

1. Roars, Thunderings, Explosions, Hissing roars, Bangs, Booms
2. Whistling, Hissing, Puffing
3. Whispers, Murmurs, Mumbling, Muttering, Gurgling
4. Screeching, Creaking, Rustling, Buzzing, Crackling, Scraping
5. Noises obtained by beating on metals, woods, skins, stones, pottery, etc.
6. Voices of animals and people, Shouts, Screams, Shrieks, Wails, Hoots, Howls, Death rattles, Sobs

Russolo asserts that these are the most basic and fundamental noises, and that all other noises are only associations and combinations of these. He built a family of instruments, the Intonarumori, to imitate these six kinds of noises.

== Conclusions ==
Russolo includes a list of conclusions:

1. Futurist composers should use their creativity and innovation to "enlarge and enrich the field of sound" by approaching the "noise-sound."
2. Futurist musicians should strive to replicate the infinite timbres in noises.
3. Futurist musicians should free themselves from the traditional and seek to explore the diverse rhythms of noise.
4. The complex tonalities of noise can be achieved by creating instruments that replicate that complexity.
5. The creation of instruments that replicate noise should not be a difficult task, since the manipulation of pitch will be simple once the mechanical principles that create the noise have been recreated. Pitch can be manipulated through simple changes in speed or tension.
6. The new orchestra will not evoke new and novel emotions by imitating the noises of life, but by finding new and unique combinations of timbres and rhythms in noise, to find a way to fully express the rhythm and sound that stretches beyond normal un-inebriated comprehension.
7. The variety of noise is infinite, and as man creates new machines the number of noises he can differentiate between continues to grow.
8. Therefore, he invites all talented musicians to pay attention to noises and their complexity, and once they discover the broadness of noise's palette of timbres, they will develop a passion for noise. He predicts that our "multiplied sensibility, having been conquered by futurist eyes, will finally have some futurist ears, and . . . every workshop will become an intoxicating orchestra of noise."

== Gallery of works ==
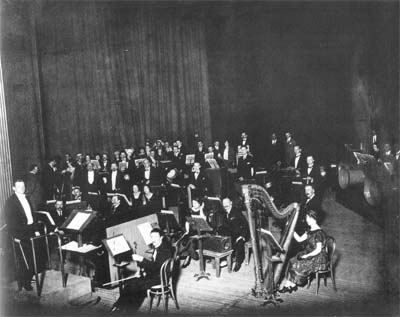
photo of an Intonarumori concert with noise-machines

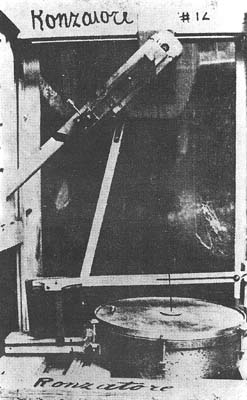
photo of an indoor Intonarumori machine (must be rotated!)

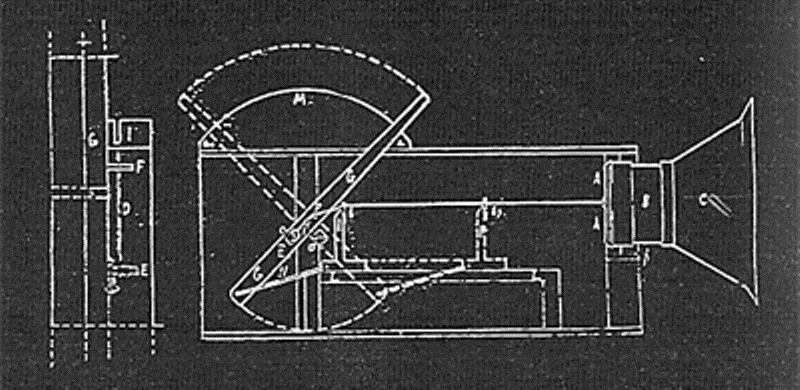
instruction-schema for building an Intonarumori noise-machine

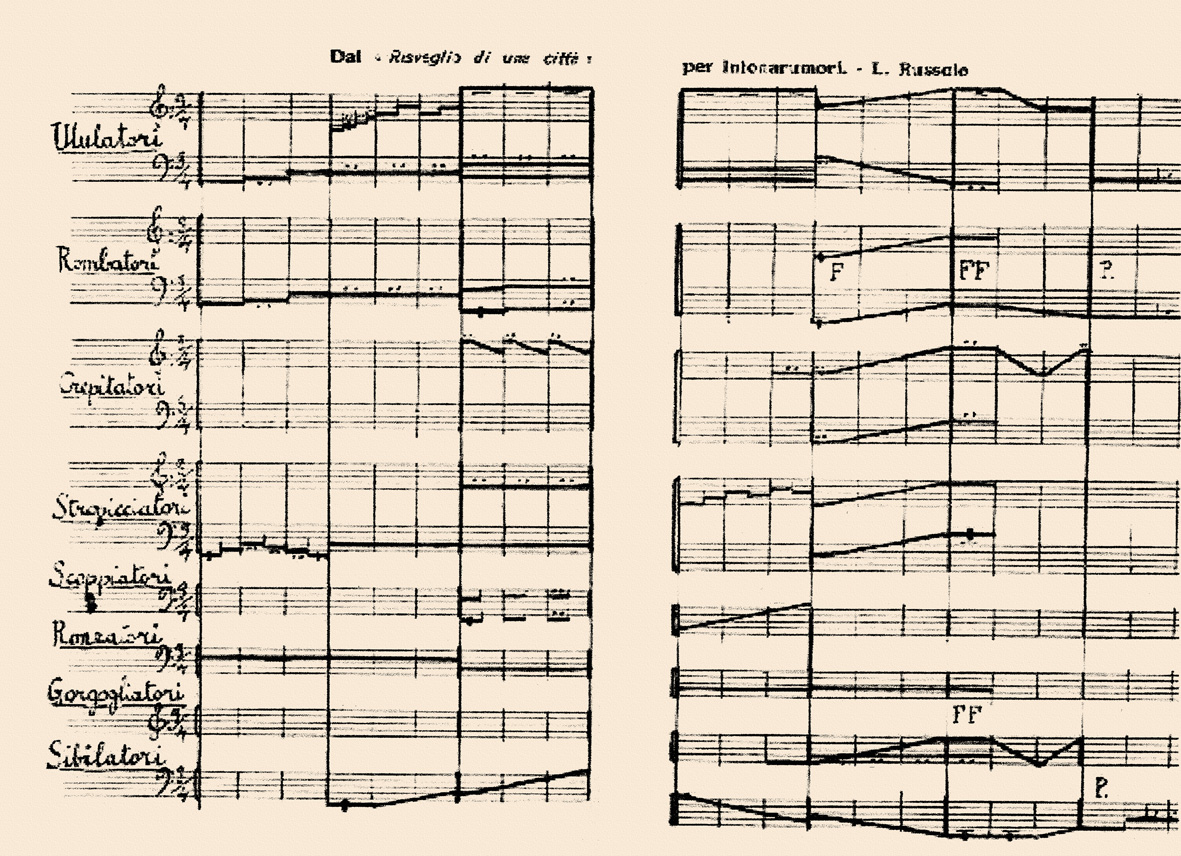
Russolo, 1913: score of en-harmonic notation; partitura for Intonarumori

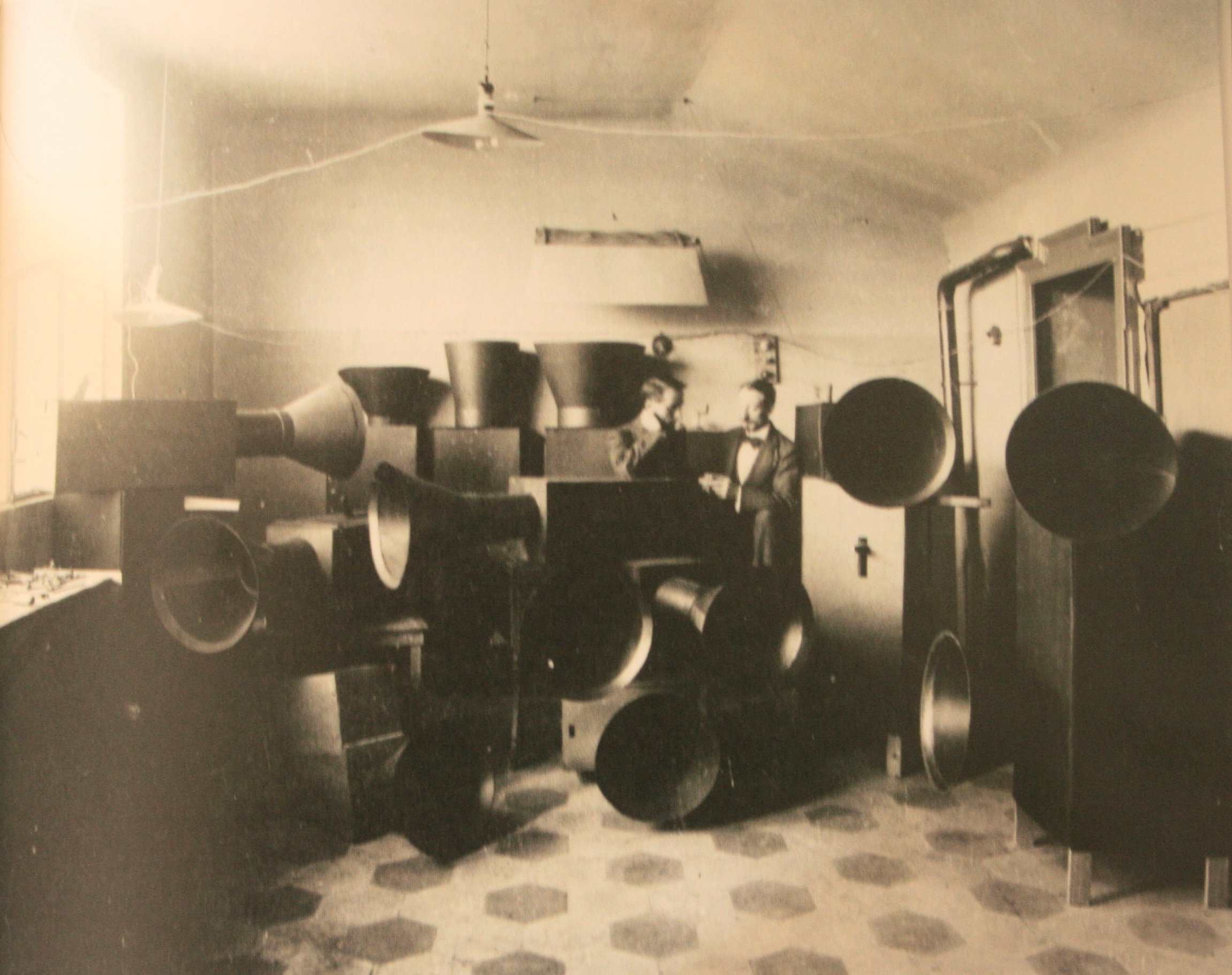
Russolo, 1913 and his assistant Ugo Piatti in their Milan studio with the Intonarumori (noise machines)

== Musicians/Artists influenced by The Art of Noises ==
- John Cage
- Pierre Schaeffer
- Pierre Henry
- Art of Noise
- Adam Ant
- Einstürzende Neubauten
- Test Dept
- Joseph Nechvatal
- DJ Spooky
- Dywane Thomas, Jr.
- Francisco López
- R. Henry Nigl
- Material
- Luciano Berio and Bruno Maderna

== See also ==
- Intonarumori
- Experimental music
- Experimental musical instrument
- Musica Futurista: The Art of Noises
- Noise music

== Bibliography ==
- Russolo, Luigi: L’Art des bruits. Textes réunis et préfacés par Giovanni Lista, bibliographie établie par Giovanni Lista. L’Age d’Homme, Lausanne, 1975.
- Chessa, Luciano: Luigi Russolo, Futurist: Noise, Visual Arts, and the Occult. University of California Press, 2012.
- Lista, Giovanni: Luigi Russolo e la musica futurista. Mudima, Milan, 2009. ISBN 978-88-96817-00-1
- Lista, Giovanni: Journal des Futurismes. Éditions Hazan, Paris, 2008.
- Lista, Giovanni: Le Futurisme: Création et avant-garde. Éditions L’Amateur, Paris, 2001.
