= Intonarumori =

Experimental musical instruments built by Luigi Russolo

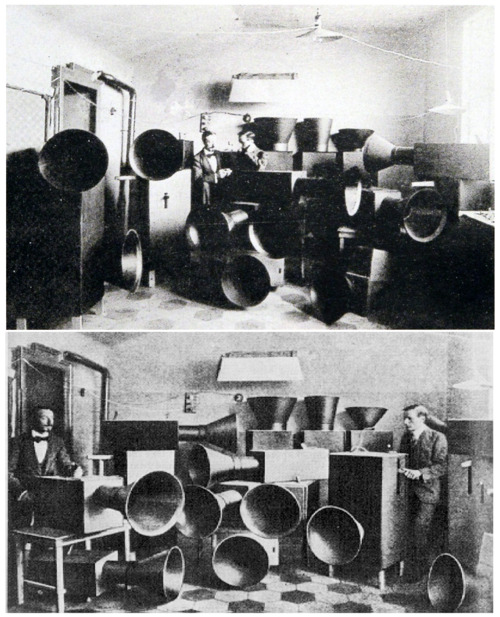
Russolo, his assistant Ugo Piatti and the intonarumori

Intonarumori are experimental musical instruments invented and built by the Italian futurist Luigi Russolo between roughly 1910 and 1930. There were 27 varieties of intonarumori built in total, with different names.

== Background ==
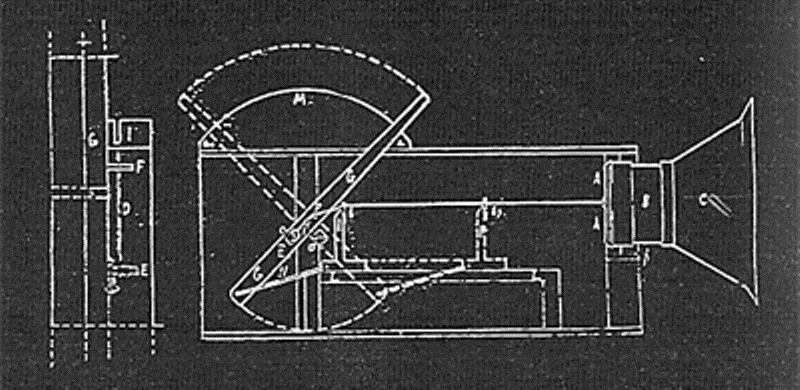
Original sketch of one of the intonarumori (1914)

Russolo built these instruments to perform the music outlined in his The Art of Noises manifesto written in 1913 and published in book form in 1916. The instruments were completely acoustic, not electronic. The boxes had various types of internal construction to create different types of noise music. Often a wheel was touching a string attached to a drum. The wheel rattled or bowed the strings, while the drum functioned as an acoustic resonator. Many of the instruments featured a handle on top of the box, which was used to vary the string tension. Pulling the handle raised the tone, and the horn attached to the box amplified the sound. Intonarumori ('noise tuner' in Italian) made noise, but not at a very high volume, since they were all acoustic devices. This "noise music" consisted of sounds that were found in nature or sounds that were directly, or indirectly, made by humans. These instruments used enharmonic properties to create sounds that glided from one note to the next, like the sound of a police siren.

== Reconstructions ==
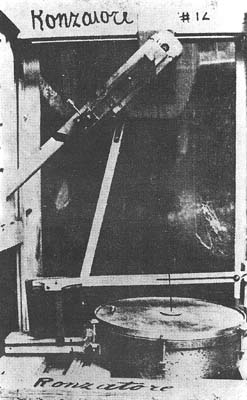
Interior of a ronzatore

Most of Russolo's instruments were destroyed in Paris when the city was bombed during World War II. Others have simply disappeared. Original sketches still exist, however, along with a few sound recordings of the original instruments. Based on these sources, three collections of reconstructions exist.

As part of its celebration of the 100th anniversary of Italian Futurism, the Performa 09 biennial, in collaboration with the Experimental Media and Performing Arts Center (EMPAC) and the San Francisco Museum of Modern Art, invited Luciano Chessa (author of the book Luigi Russolo, Futurist. Noise, Visual Arts, and the Occult) to direct a reconstruction project to produce accurate replicas of Russolo's legendary intonarumori instruments. This project offered the set of 16 original intonarumori (8 noise families of 1–3 instruments each, in various registers) that Russolo built in Milan in the summer of 1913. These intonarumori were physically built by luthier Keith Cary in Winters, California, under Chessa's direction and scientific supervision. The concert premiered at the San Francisco Museum of Modern Art on October 16, 2009, before traveling to New York City for its Performa 09 presentation at The Town Hall on November 12, 2009. In September 2010, Chessa presented the recreated intonarumori in its first Italian appearance, a concert event at the Museum of Modern and Contemporary Art of Trento and Rovereto in Rovereto, Italy, as part of the Festival Transart, which featured performances by Nicholas Isherwood.

With 2013 being the 100th anniversary of both The Art of Noises and John Cage's birth, the curators of Carnegie Mellon University's Wats:ON? Festival, Golan Levin and Spike Wolff, felt the time was ripe for a presentation of noise and decided to reconstruct the forgotten intonarumori instruments for the festival. Carl Bajandas, a sculptor, an instrument builder, took the lead and built 10 intonarumori instruments. Meanwhile, experimental composer, music technologist John Ozbay, has been asked to compose for the intonarumori instruments. The performance took place in Carnegie Mellon University's Kresge Theatre on April 4, 2013. Followed by performances of electronic/experimental music artists, Jeremy Boyle, Michael Johnsen, Eric Singer and Lesley Flanigan.

Dutch sound artist Wessel Westerveld made a series of replicas. Westerveld's replicas are the most professional versions with welded steel horns instead of cardboard and nailed steel cones like the Italian and New York ones. The woodwork of these versions are also real hard wood instead of plywood. Westerveld has also made a few open variants with the sound system visible from the outside. Westerveld performs regularly with his intonarumori in collaboration with Dutch sound artist Yuri Landman. The Dutch replicas were shown and played by Westerveld at the Tuned City festivals in several cities, and a few times at the GOGBOT festival in Enschede. In 2012, Lee Ranaldo of Sonic Youth, wrote a score for the instruments at the Performa festival in New York City. In 2015, the Italian band King Tongue staged a tribute to Russolo at Circolo Filologico in Milan performing along with an orchestra of four intonarumori conducted by Lounge Lizards founding member Steve Piccolo. Czech composer Miroslav Pudlák's Intonarumori Concerto, for three intonarumori soloists and chamber orchestra, was premiered by the Berg Orchestra in Prague in 2018. The Prague-based Opening Performance Orchestra has released a recording using these replicas in Pudlák's Intonarumoris on Sub Rosa Records.
