= Luigi Russolo =

Italian Futurist artist and composer (1885–1947)

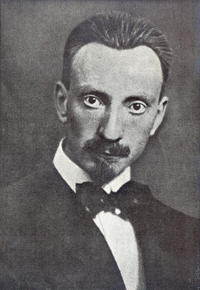
- Russolo c. 1916

Background information
- Born: Luigi Russolo; 30 April 1885; Portogruaro, Italy
- Died: 4 February 1947 (aged 61) Laveno Mombello, Italy
- Genres: Futurism; experimental; avant-garde; noise
- Occupations: Composer; painter; custom instrument builder
- Years active: 1901–1947

Luigi Carlo Filippo Russolo (30 April 1885 – 4 February 1947) was an Italian Futurist painter, composer, builder of experimental musical instruments, and the author of the manifesto The Art of Noises (1913). Russolo completed his secondary education at Seminary of Portogruaro in 1901, after which he moved to Milan and began gaining interest in the arts. He is often regarded as one of the first noise music experimental composers with his performances of noise music concerts in 1913–14 and then again after World War I, notably in Paris in 1921. He designed and constructed a number of noise-generating devices called Intonarumori.

== Biography ==
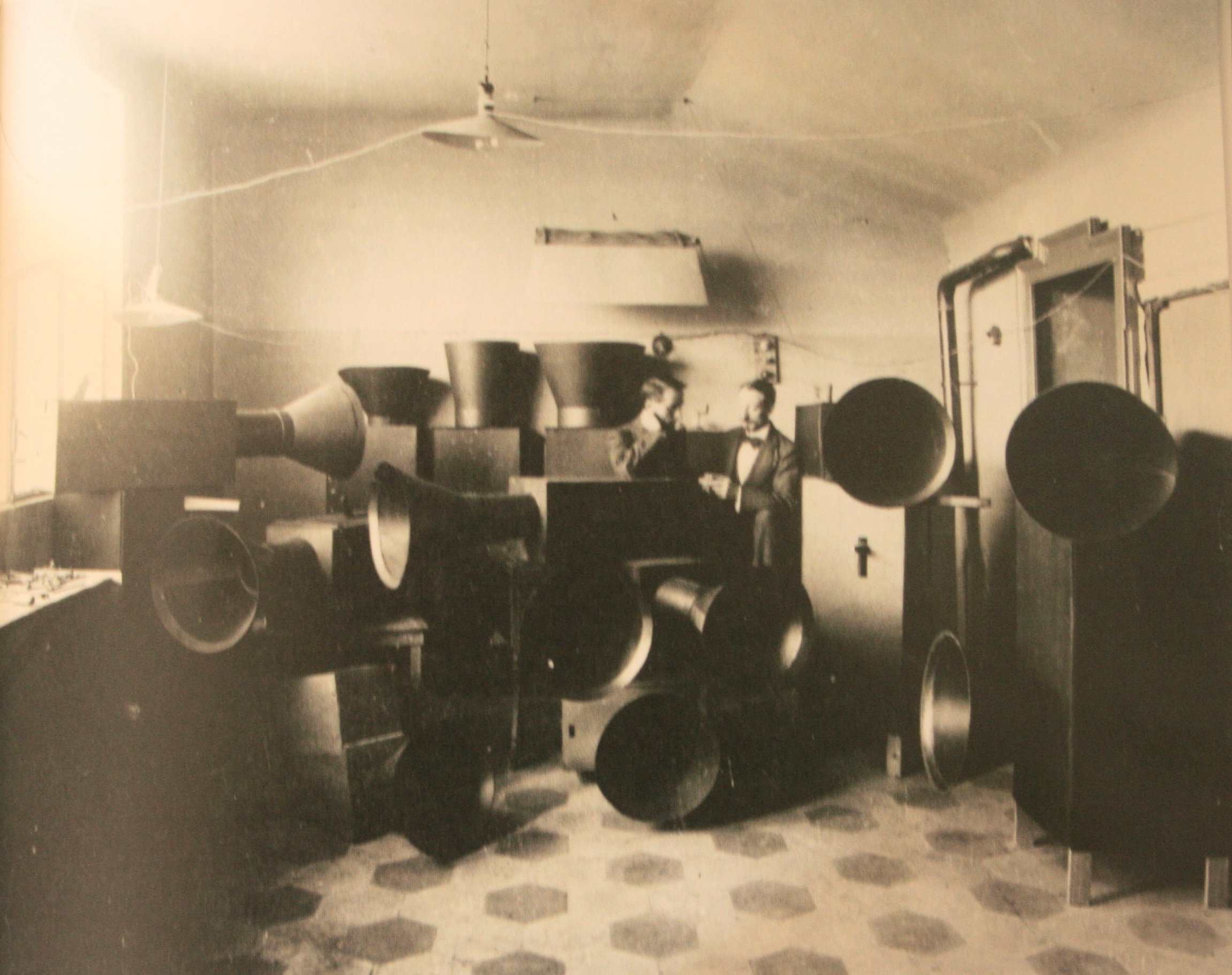
Russolo and his assistant Ugo Piatti in their Milan studio in 1913 with the Intonarumori (noise machines)

Luigi Russolo was perhaps the first noise artist. His 1913 manifesto, L'Arte dei Rumori (The Art of Noises), stated that the industrial revolution had given modern men a greater capacity to appreciate more complex sounds. Russolo found traditional melodic music confining, and he envisioned noise music as its future replacement.

Russolo designed and constructed a number of noise-generating devices called Intonarumori, and assembled a noise orchestra to perform with them. A performance of his Gran Concerto Futuristico (1917) was met with strong disapproval and violence from the audience, as Russolo himself had predicted.

None of his intoning instruments have survived: some were destroyed in World War II; while others have been lost. Replicas of the instruments have since been built and performed. (See the Intonarumori page.)

Although Russolo's works bear little resemblance to modern noise music, his pioneering creations cannot be overlooked as an essential stage in the evolution of the several genres in this category. Many artists are now familiar with Russolo's manifesto.

== Connections to Fascism ==
Russolo, like many other Futurist artists, is often associated with Italian fascism. In addition to his association with the Futurist artist and poet F. T. Marinetti, who co-authored the Fascist Manifesto (1919), Russolo presented his work at exhibitions sponsored by Mussolini's government. His biographer Luciano Chessa argues that some have attempted to erase Russolo's involvement with fascism from scholarship, but that his permanent return to Italy in 1933 and subsequent writings signaled acceptance of and allegiance to Mussolini's regime.

== Collaboration with Antonio Russolo ==
Antonio Russolo, another Italian Futurist composer and Luigi's brother, produced a recording of two works featuring the original Intonarumori. The phonograph recording, made in 1921, included works entitled Corale and Serenata, which combined conventional orchestral music set against the sound of the noise machines. It is the only surviving contemporaneous sound recording of Luigi Russolo's noise music. Russolo and Filippo Tommaso Marinetti gave the first concert of Futurist music, complete with intonarumori, in April 1914, causing a riot. The program comprised four Noise Networks.

== Gallery ==
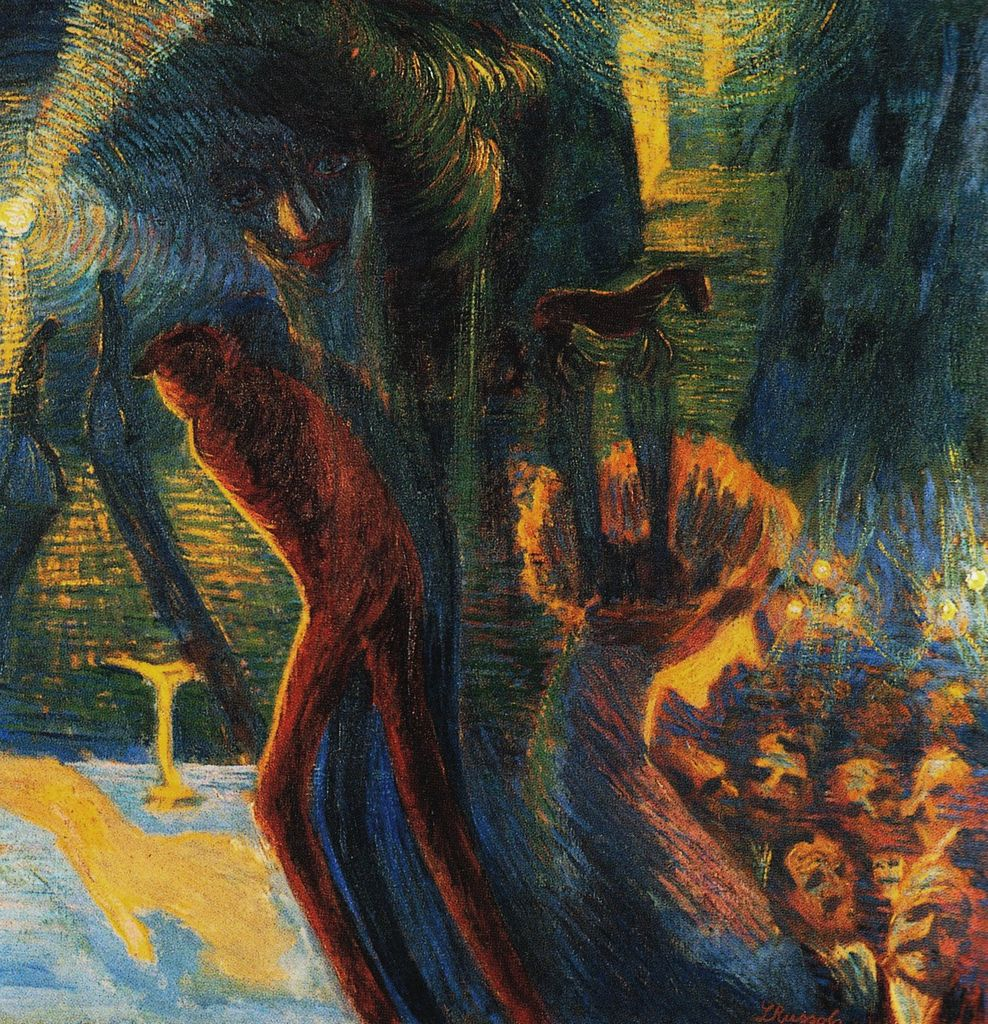
Souvenir d'une nuit (Memories of a Night), 1911 oil on canvas, 99 × 99 cm, private collection

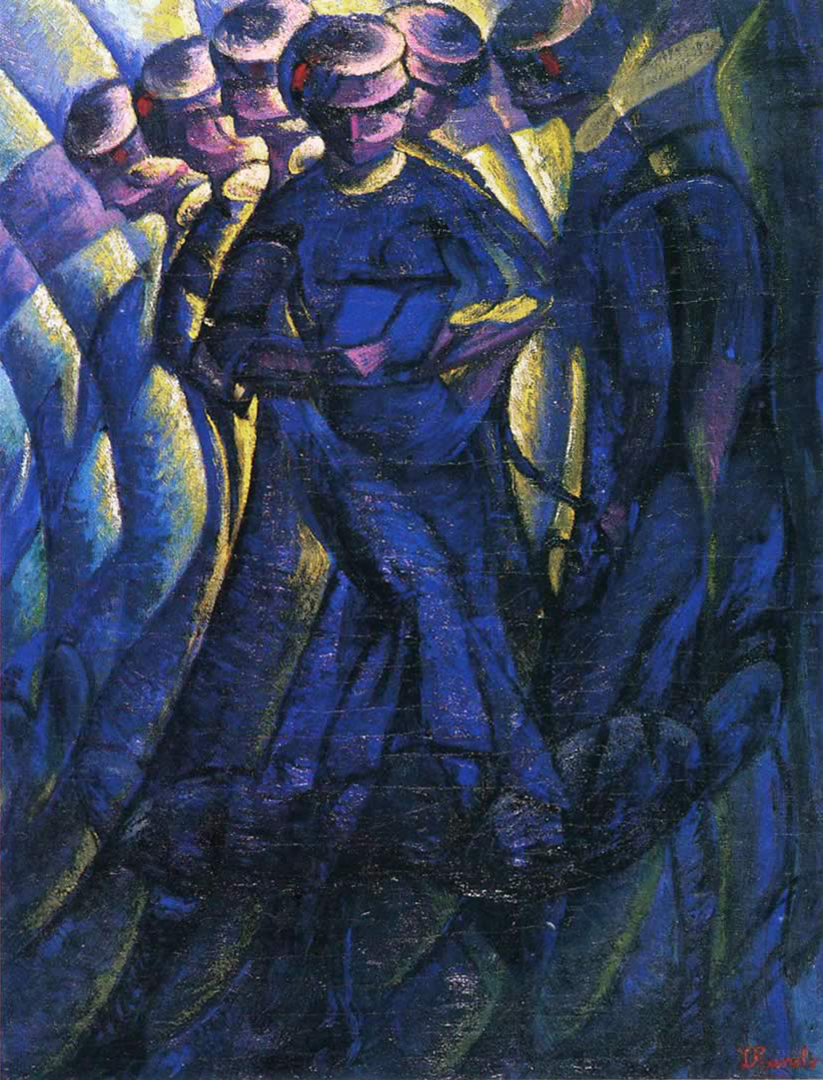
Sintesi plastica dei movimenti di una donna, 1912 oil on canvas, Museum of Grenoble

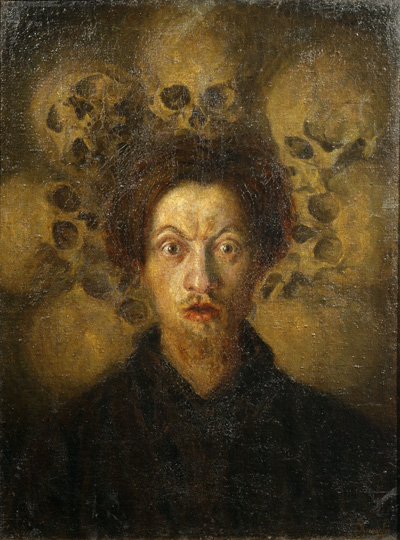
Self-portrait with Skulls, 1909 painting

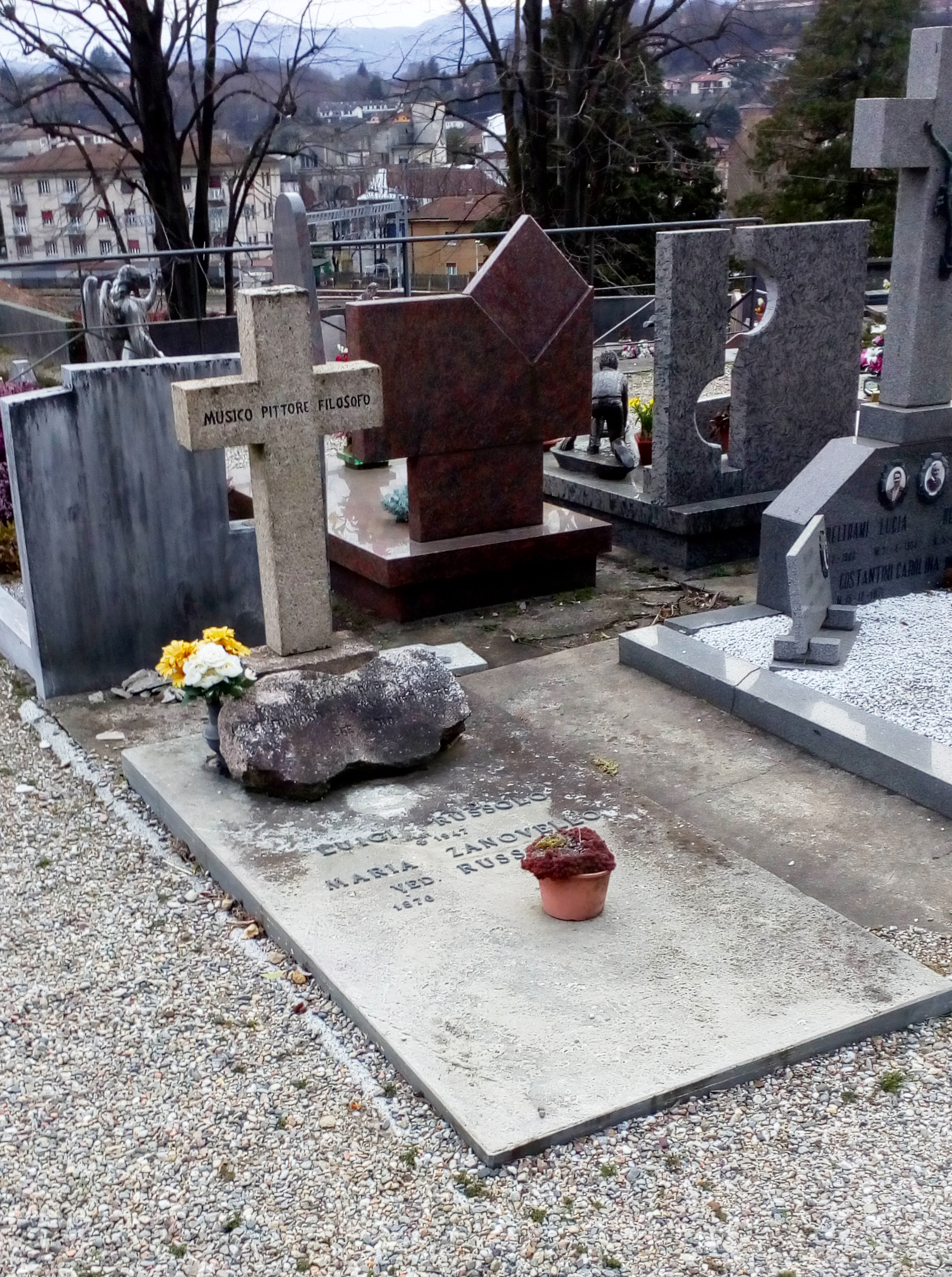
Russolo's Grave in Laveno-Mombello

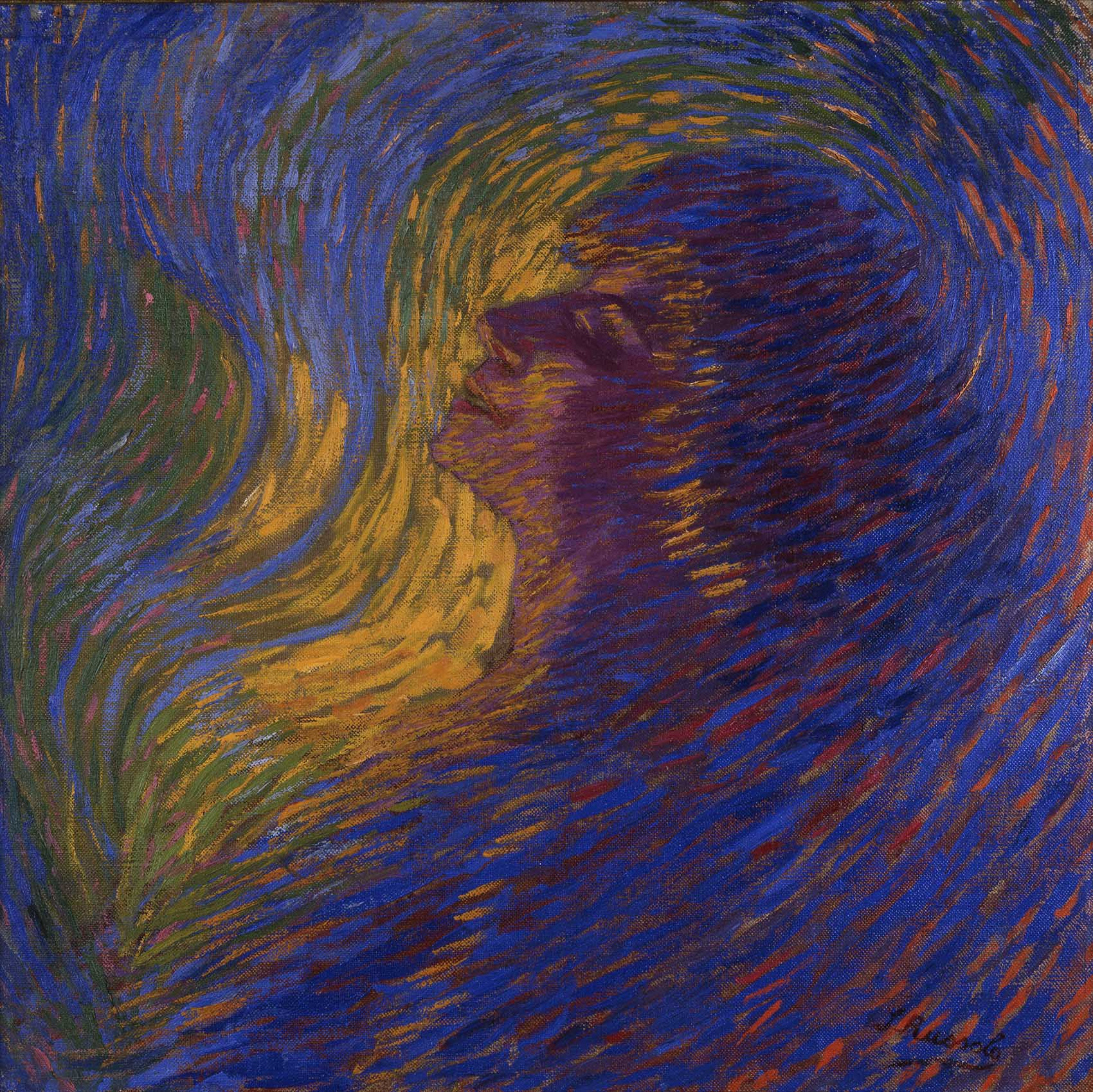
Profumo (meaning "scent", "fragrance", 1910)

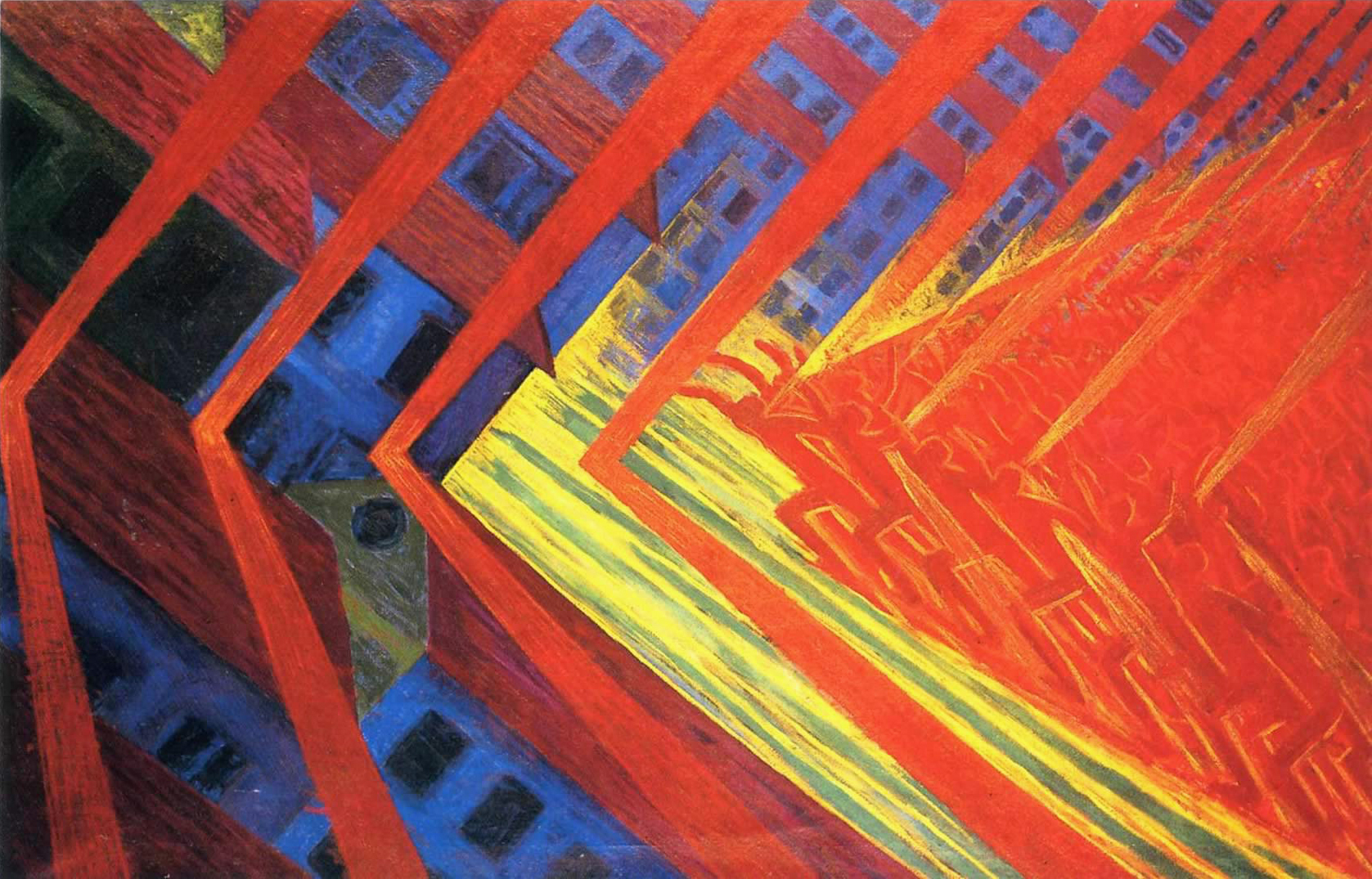
La Rivolta (The Revolt), 1911 oil on canvas

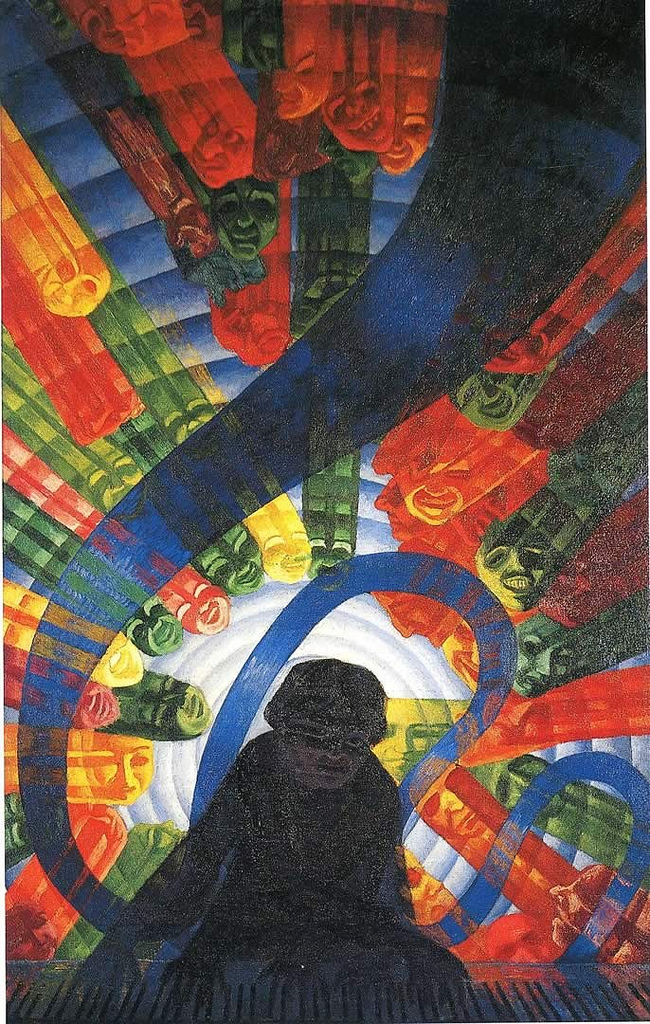
La Musica (a pianist playing for his audience), 1911–12 oil on canvas

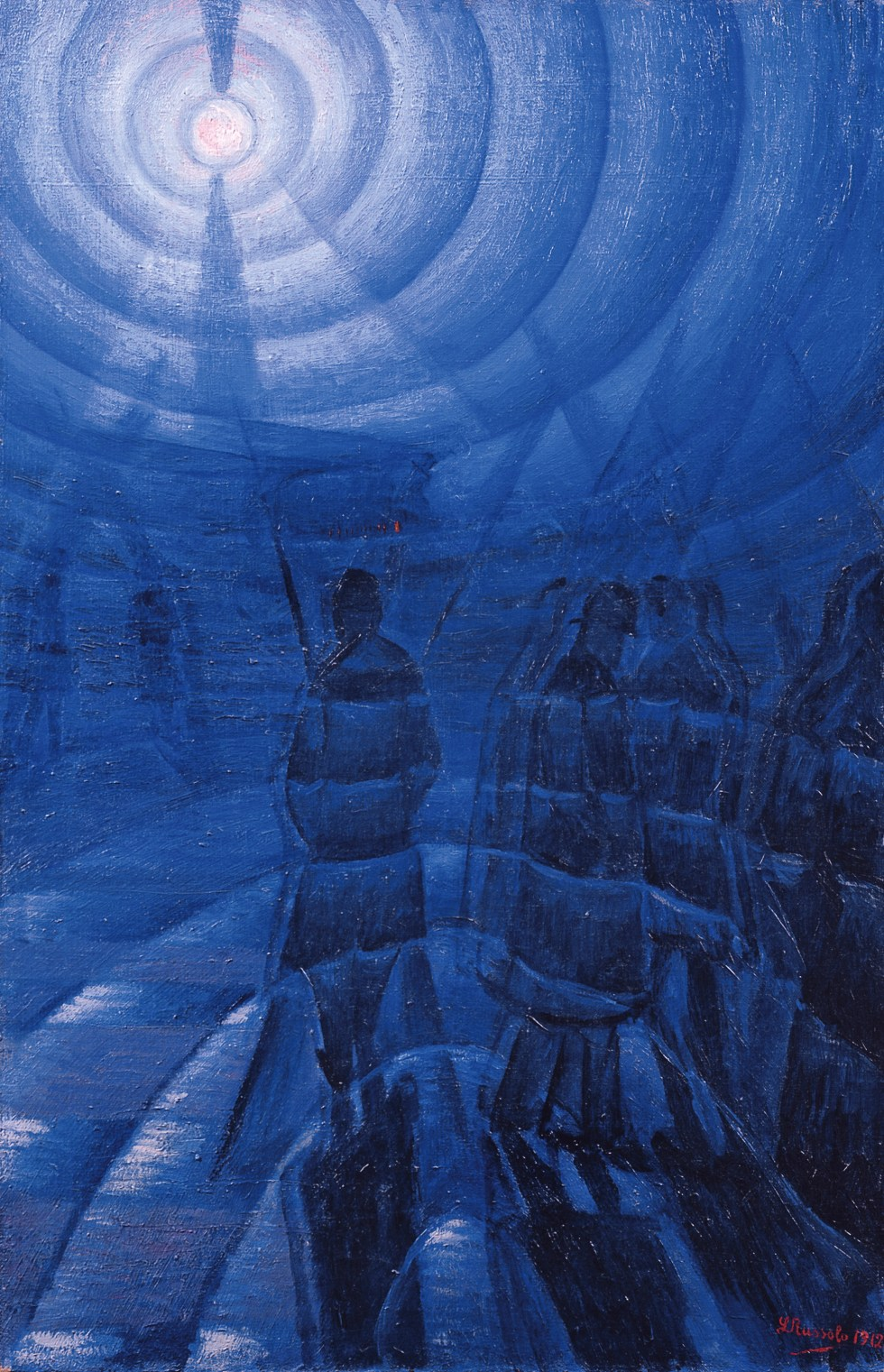
Solidity of Fog, 1912 oil on canvas

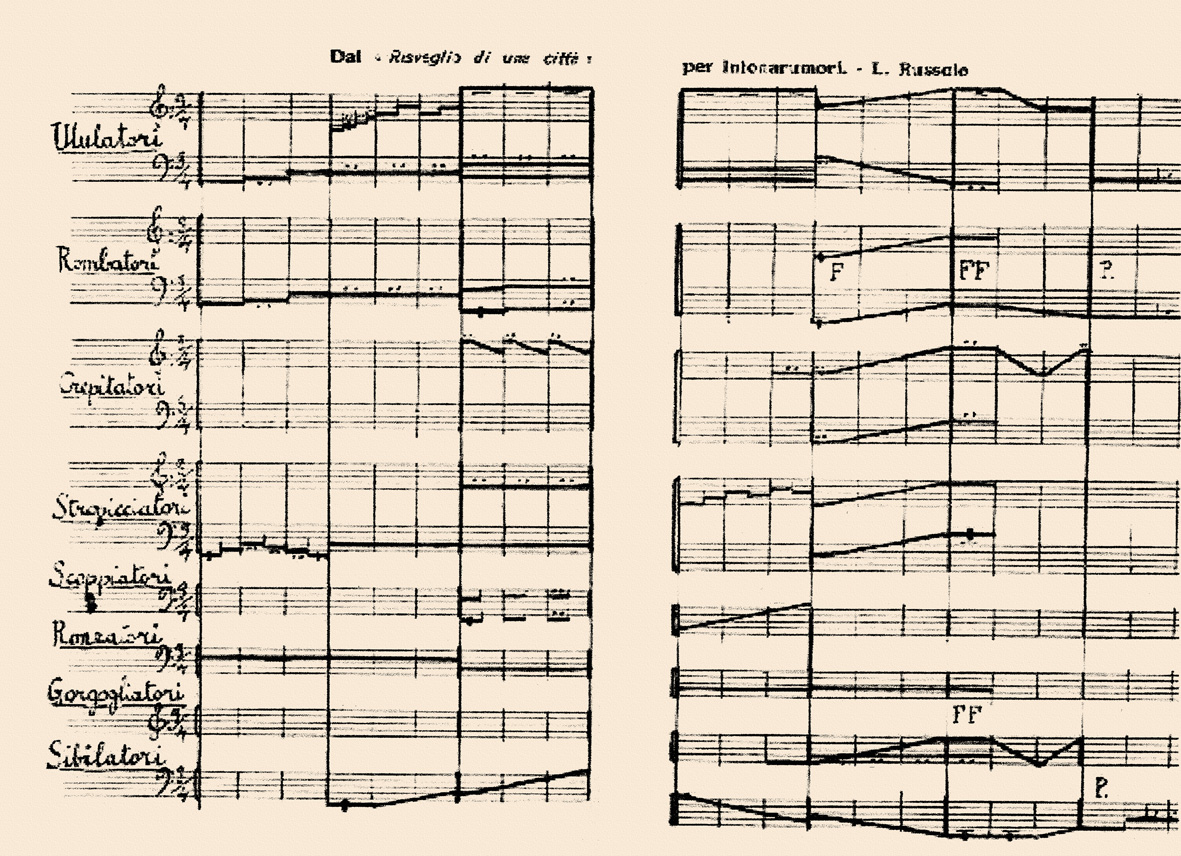
1913 score of en-harmonic notation, for Intonarumori

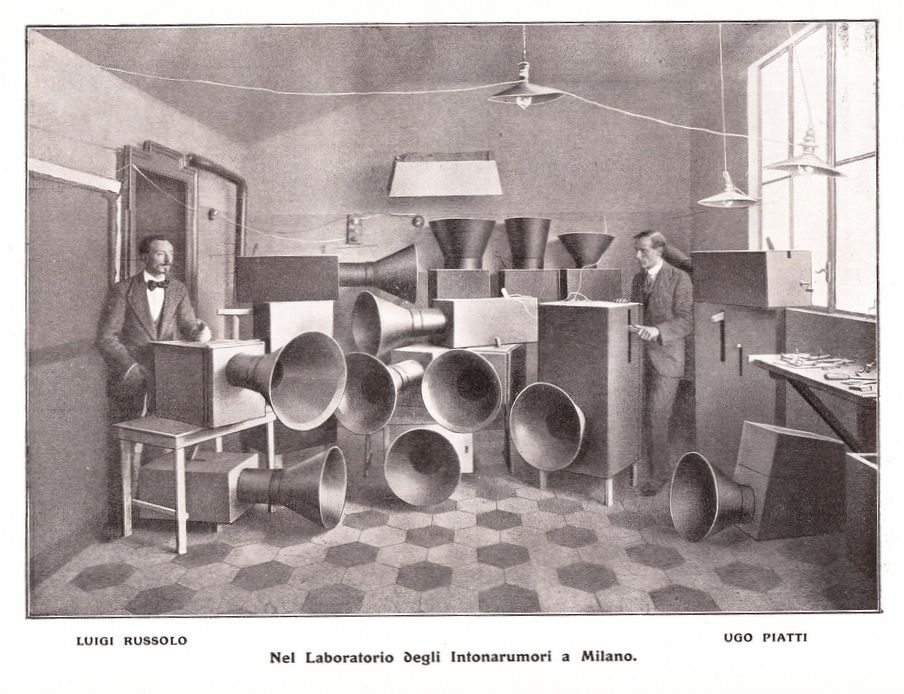
Intonarumori, 1913, instruments built for music-piece Bruitism, partly operating on electricity

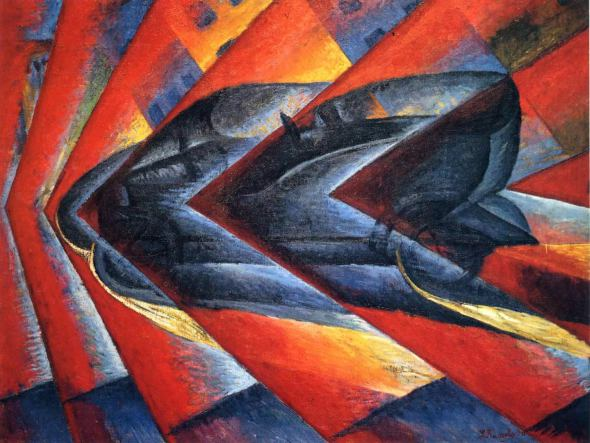
Dynamism of a Car, 1913 oil painting

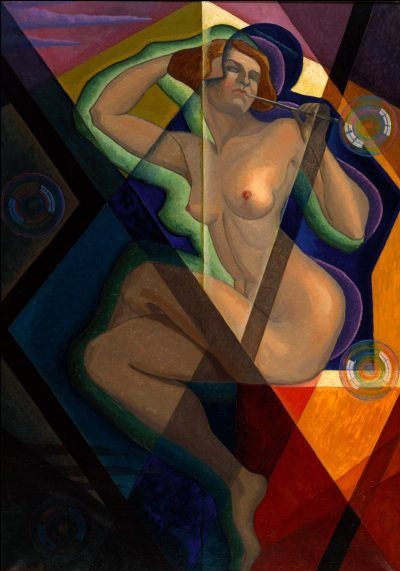
Soap-dish, 1929 oil painting

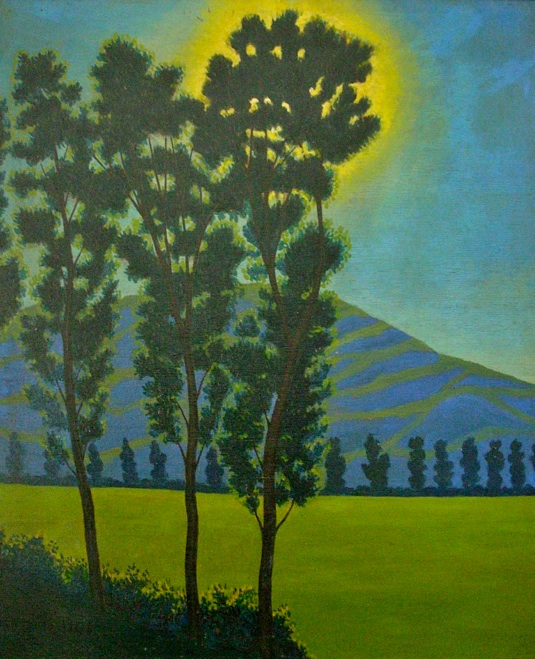
Landscape with trees, c. 1940s painting

== Publications ==
- Chessa, Luciano (2012). Luigi Russolo, futurist: noise, visual arts, and the occult. Berkeley, Calif: University of California Press. p. 8. ISBN 978-0-520-27063-3.
- Duccio Dogheria, Fondo Luigi Russolo. Inventario, inventory of the artist's archive at the Archivio del 900 of the Mart in Rovereto

== See also ==
- Ugo Piatti
- List of noise musicians
- Theosophy and visual arts § Russolo

== Notes ==
=== References ===
- Chilvers, Ian; Glaves-Smith, John (2009). A Dictionary of Modern and Contemporary Art. Oxford University Press. ISBN 9780199239665.
- Chessa, Luciano: Luigi Russolo, Futurist: Noise, Visual Arts, and the Occult. University of California Press, 2012.
- Luigi Russolo, The Art of Noise (Futurist Manifesto, 1913), translated by Robert Filliou
