= Dominick Fernow =

American experimental musician

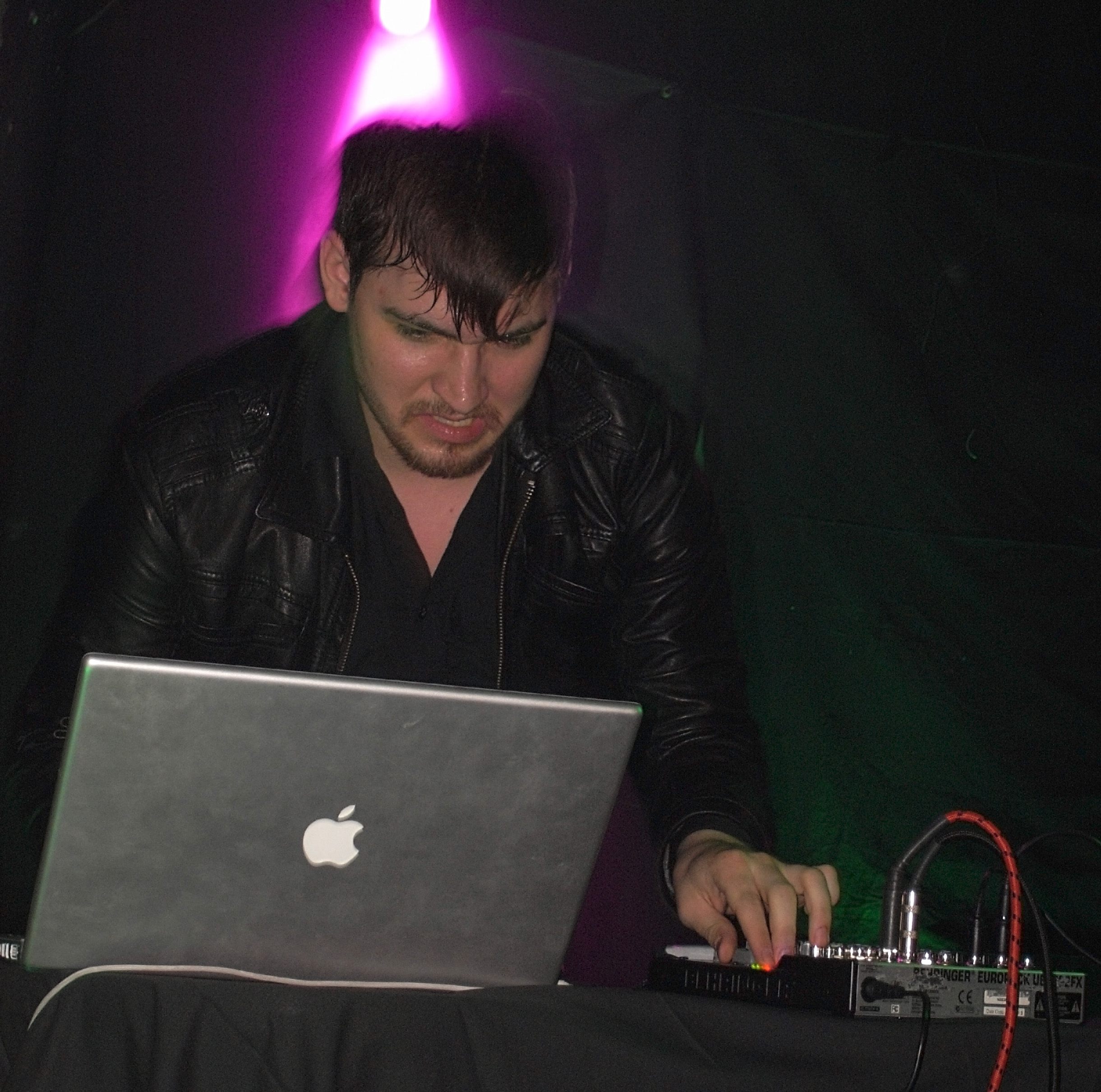
- Fernow performing live with Consumer Electronics in 2007

Background information
- Also known as: Prurient; Vatican Shadow; Rainforest Spiritual Enslavement; Christian Cosmos
- Born: Ian Dominick Fernow
- Origin: Madison, Wisconsin, U.S.
- Genres: Noise; electronic; power electronics; experimental; techno; industrial; ambient; dark wave
- Occupations: Musician; poet; multimedia artist
- Instruments: Amplifier; drums; vocals; synthesizer
- Years active: 1998–present
- Labels: American Tapes; Hanson; RRRecords; Load; Troubleman Unlimited; Chrondritic Sound; Hospital Productions; Kitty Play
- Website: hospitalproductions.net

Ian Dominick Fernow is an American experimental musician, poet and multimedia artist. He is best known for extreme music released under the stage name Prurient, as well as numerous other aliases including Vatican Shadow, Rainforest Spiritual Enslavement and Christian Cosmos. His first releases date back to 1998, the same year in which he founded the record label Hospital Productions.

== Life ==
Fernow hails from Wisconsin and his mother is the poet and former radio host Jean Feraca. He recounts his entrance into public school and his exposure to death metal and tape trading as early sources of musical interest. In particular, Fernow cites the death metal band Deicide's album Once upon the Cross as, "frightening ... A huge record for me, still to this day."

Fernow has resided in Providence, New York City, Los Angeles, and Berlin, and runs the labels Hospital Productions and Bed of Nails.

== Career ==
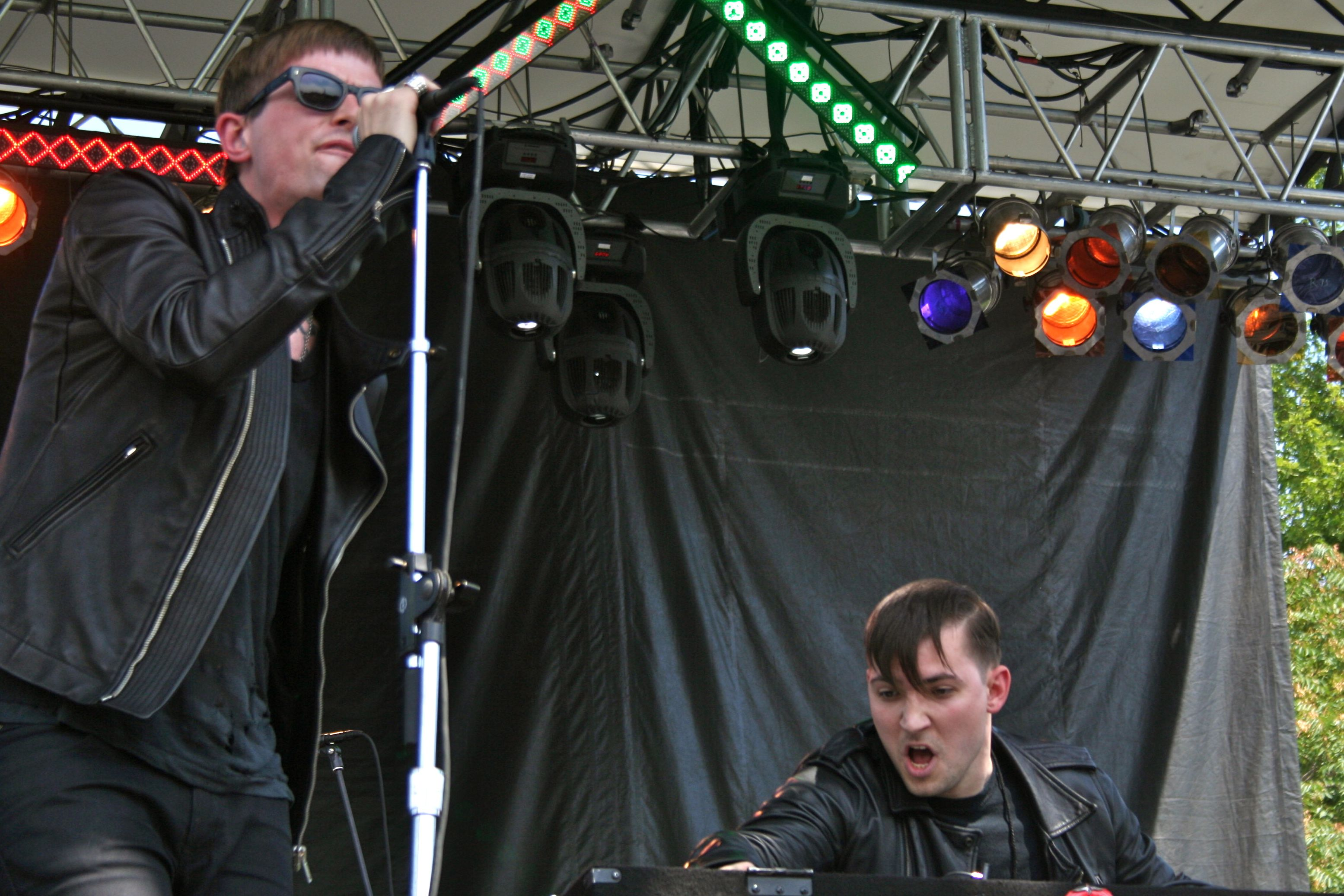
Fernow (right) performing with Cold Cave in 2011

In his early work as Prurient, Fernow worked primarily with a microphone and amplifier, and sometimes drums. He eventually began utilizing more electronics, and currently works primarily with laptop and synthesizers. In the past, he collaborated with artists like John Wiese (of Sissy Spacek), Jeff Plummer (of Immaculate:Grotesque and Shallow Waters), Kris Lapke (of Alberich and MCMS), Wolf Eyes, Macronympha, and Philip Best (of Whitehouse and Consumer Electronics).

Fernow has also performed in various bands, such as Football Rabbit, Vegas Martyrs, Taylor Bow, Ash Pool, and formerly as part of Cold Cave. Prurient has released material on numerous independent record labels, such as Hanson Records, RRRecords, Load Records, Troubleman Unlimited, Chrondritic Sound, Kitty Play Records, American Tapes, and his own label Hospital Productions. Fernow has also recorded music under a variety of aliases, including Vatican Shadow, Rainforest Spiritual Enslavement, Exploring Jezebel, River Magic, Winter Soldier, Window Cleaning By Ian, December Magic, and Tortured Hooker.

Prurient has been covered in outlets such as The New Yorker, Pitchfork Media, The Village Voice, and Resident Advisor.

== Partial discography ==
=== As Prurient ===
Year	Title	Label	Format	Notes
1998	A Simple Mark	Hospital Productions	Cassette	
1998	Blades Steam Red Sweat, Inside The Things I Dread	Hospital Productions	CD-R	
1998	Persistence	Beeshu Records	Cassette	split with Potassium Cyanide Dogbane Sentiment
1999	A Call For Help	Hospital Productions	Cassette	
1999	Entrepreneur	Hospital Productions	Cassette	
1999	Model	Hospital Productions	Cassette	
1999	Prurient / Jon Borges	Hospital Productions	Cassette	split with Jon Borges
1999	O.C.D.	Hospital Productions	Cassette	
1999	Observer	Hospital Productions	Cassette	
2000	Collaboration	Let It Rot	CD	with Richard Ramirez & Flatline Construct
2000	Mundane	Ninth Circle Music	CD-R	split with Sickness
2000	Noise Split Tape Vol. 1	Brainchaos	Cassette	split with Echo System
2000	Ornamentation	Zaftig Research	CD-R	collaboration with Goose
2000	Point And Void	Hospital Productions	2xCassette	
2001	Arbitrary Witness	Deadline Recordings	2xCassette	
2001	Body Language	Peel Back the Sky	LP	
2001	Collaboration	Hospital Productions	CD	with Diagram A and Furisubi
2001	Guide to Grooming	Monorail Trespassing	Cassette	
2001	Hunt in Couples	Hospital Productions, Anti-Everything	7"	split with ASD
2001	Magnified Healing	Hospital Productions, T.E.F.	CD	split with T.E.F. & Richard Ramirez
2001	Mater Dolorosa	Hospital Productions	CD	
2001	Mummification and Prayer	Hospital Productions	Cassette	
2001	White Plains Leather: Black River Falls	Hospital Productions	Cassette	
2001	Valve Testing	Electronic Musik		Compilation: 1 track:Pastune as Well
2002	Live Prayer	Electronic Musik	3", CD-R	
2002	Something Terrible Has Happened and I Need Your Help	Monorail Trespassing	Cassette	
2002	The History of Aids	Hospital Productions/Armageddon	CD	
2003	Recycled Music	RRRecords	Cassette	
2003	Troubled Sleep	Truculent Recordings	CD	
2003	We Set off in High Spirits	Gods of Tundra	Cassette	
2004	60 Minutes of Silence	American Tapes	Cassette	
2004	Fossil	Truculent Recordings	CD	
2004	Red Head	RRRecords	Cassette	with Pedestrial Deposit
2004	Shipwreckers Diary	Ground Fault	CD	
2004	Starvation	Hospital Productions	Cassette	
2004	Sexual Magic	Hospital Productions	2xCassette	
2004	The Hidden Family/+White+	Load Records	12"/CD	with Kites
2004	White Magic	Hospital Productions	Cassette	
2005	African Division	Hospital Productions	Cassette	
2005	Akitsa / Prurient	Hospital Productions	Cassette	split with Akitsa
2005	Black Vase	Load Records	CD/LP	
2005	Church of Ammunition	Troubleman Unlimited Records	7"	
2005	Devil In Broad Daylight	Chondritic Sound	2xCassette	
2005	Disappearance Of The Maya	Hospital Productions	4xCassette	split with Aaron Dilloway
2005	In The Slaughterhouse	Hospital Productions	7"	
2005	Love and Romance	Hospital Productions	LP	split with Nicole 12
2005	Macronympha + Prurient / Okha	Dada Drumming	12"	split with Macronympha and Okha
2005	The Baron's Chamber	Nihilist Records	CD	
2005	The Warriors	Hospital Productions/Gods of Tundra	CD/LP	split with Wolf Eyes
2005	Vegas Martyrs - Choking Doberman	Kitty Play Records	7"	
2006	Cloven Spike	Hospital Productions	7"	with John Wiese
2006	Grunt / Prurient	Freak Animal Records	Cassette	split with Grunt
2006	Heavy Rain Returns	iDEAL Recordings	CD	with Carlos Giffoni
2006	Memory Repeating	AA Records	7"	
2006	Pleasure Ground	Load Records	CD	
2006	Point and Void	Ninth Circle Music	CD	
2006	Snail on a Razor	Hospital Productions	CD	
2007	All Are Guests in the House of the Lord	Hospital Productions	Cassette/CD	with Kevin Drumm
2007	Caribbean Overdose	Hospital Productions	Cassette	edition of 200
2007	Cave Depression	No Fun Productions	3x7"	
2007	Cocaine Death	Hospital Productions	Cassette	edition of 46
2007	Colonialist Nature And Misanthropy	Hospital Productions	2xCassette	
2007	Golden Swastika	Hospital Productions	Cassette	
2007	Prurient	Hanson Records	LP	
2007	Split	Important Records		with Mindflayer
2007	Taylor Bow - Hate Fuck	Hospital Productions	7"	
2007	Terminal Cases	aRCHIVE recordings	2x3" CD	split with Death Unit
2007	The Golden Chamber	Hospital Productions	Cassette	
2008	And Still, Wanting	No Fun Productions	CD + Shield 5"	
2008	Arrowhead	Mego	CD	
2008	End Of Autumn	Troubleman Unlimited	2xLP	split with Sutcliffe Jugend
2008	Ghosts Of Niagara	Hospital Productions	10xCass	split with Burning Star Core
2008	Tylenol Murders	Hospital Productions	Cassette	edition of 20
2008	Cocaine Death	Hospital Productions	CD	
2008	Time Began in a Garden	Hospital Productions	2xCassette, C10 + Box	edition of 100
2008	The Black Post Society	Cold Spring Records	CD	
2009	Blood of the Lamb	BloodLust!	LP	split with Wilt ( edition of 100)
2009	Palm Tree Corpse	Hospital Productions	3xCassette/LP	
2009	Roman	Harbinger Sound	LP	
2009	Rose Pillar	Heartworm Press	11"	with book (edition of 500)
2009	Stars Explode	Hospital Productions	Cassette/LP	with Cold Cave
2009	The Complete Kingdom Recordings	The Institute For Organic Conversations	4xCassette	split with Wilt
2010	Jesus	Hospital Productions	2xCassette	split with Nico Vascellari
2011	Annihilationist	Hospital Productions	Cassette	
2011	Many Jewels Surround the Crown	Hydra Head	7"	
2011	Bermuda Drain	Hydra Head	CD/LP/Cassette	
2011	Time's Arrow	Hydra Head	EP	
2011	Stun Gun	Quasi Pop Records	7"	
2011	Despiritualized	Hospital Productions	Cassette	
2012	Of The Memories Of Friends	Hospital Productions	2xCassette	
2012	Oxidation	Hospital Productions	Cassette	
2012	Tiger Smells A Corpse	Hospital Productions	3xCassette	
2012	Wrapped in the Flame of Illusion, Masked in the Clay of Behavior	Dais Records	2x7"	
2012	Worship is the Cleansing of the Imagination	Hydra Head	12"	split with JK Flesh
2013	Through the Window	Blackest Ever Black	Cassette, Vinyl, CD	
2014	Washed Against The Rocks	Handmade Birds	7"	
2015	Frozen Niagara Falls	Profound Lore	2CD/3xLP	
2015	Cocaine Daughter	Hospital Productions	Cassette	
2016	Unknown Rains	Hospital Productions	2xLP	
2017	Rainbow Mirror	Profound Lore	4CD/7xLP	
2019	Garden of the Mutilated Paratroopers	Profound Lore	2CD/Cassette	
2019	Noise For Halloween Night	Amazon Music	CD	
2020	Casablanca Flamethrower	Tesco Organization	2xLP/Album	
2020	Chain Reaction at Dusk	Hospital Productions		Split with Kelly Moran
2021	Black Crows Cyborg	Hospital Productions	LP	with Merzbow
2022	Creationist	Hospital Productions	6CD Cassette/7"	
2022	Annihilationism	Hospital Productions	Vinyl, CD	Split with Masonna
2023	Carte Blanche	Tesco Organization	CD, Vinyl	with Genocide Organ
2023	Cain And Abel S/M	Hospital Productions	LP	
2023	I Used to Sell Flowers by the Roadside	Doom Electronics	6CD Cassette	
2024	Government Controlled Shrines	Hospital Productions	LP	with Linekraft
2024	Electronic Storms	Hospital Productions	Cassette	
2024	BBQ Grave	Hospital Productions	Cassette	with Agonal Lust
2024	Destroyed Electricity	Doom Electronics	LP	
2024	Taxi Driver Inferno	Hospital Productions	Cassette	with Agonal Lust
2024	Class Ring	Doom Electronics	6CD Cassette	
2024	Blood Brothers	Hospital Productions	Cassette	with Alberich
2024	Retaliation	Doom Electronics	2xCassette	
2025	Black Table With The Two Griffins Attacking	Doom Electronics	4xCassette	

=== As Vatican Shadow ===
==== Studio albums ====
Year	Title	Label	Format	Notes
2011	Kneel Before Religious Icons	Hospital Productions, Type Records	Cassette, Vinyl LP	
2011	Pakistan Military Academy	Hospital Productions	Cassette	
2012	Atta's Apartment Slated for Demolition	Hospital Productions	Cassette, Digital	
2012	Ghosts of Chechnya	Hospital Productions	Cassette, Digital, Vinyl LP (2023 Remaster)	
2012	Ornamented Walls	Modern Love Records	Vinyl LP	
2013	Remember Your Black Day	Hospital Productions	CD, Vinyl LP	
2014	Games Have Rules	Hospital Productions	CD, Vinyl LP	with Function
2016	Media in the Service of Terror	Hospital Productions	Digital, Cassette	
2019	American Flesh for Violence	Hospital Productions	Digital, Cassette	Previously unreleased tracks and remixes by Alessandro Cortini, JK Flesh, Ancient Methods, CUB
2020	Persian Pillars Of The Gasoline Era	20 Buck Spin	Digital, Vinyl LP, CD, Cassette	Mastered by Justin Broadrick
2021	SR-71 Blackbird Survivors	Hospital Productions	Digital, 4x Cassette	
2022	Coast Guard Gulf of Blood	Hospital Productions	Digital, 4x Cassette	
2023	Destroy Chemical Weapons	Hospital Productions	Digital	
2025	20th Hijacker	20 Buck Spin	Digital, Vinyl LP, CD, Cassette	Mastered by Justin Broadrick
2026	Dark Factories Resurrected	Hospital Productions	Digital, Cassette	

==== EPs and singles ====
Year	Title	Label	Format	Notes
2010	Byzantine Private CIA	Hospital Productions	Cassette	4-tracks EP
2011	Washington Buries Al Qaeda Leader at Sea - Deck 1	Hospital Productions	Cassette	2-tracks single
2011	Washington Buries Al Qaeda Leader at Sea - Deck 2	Hospital Productions	Cassette	2-tracks single
2011	Washington Buries Al Qaeda Leader at Sea - Deck 3	Hospital Productions	Cassette	2-tracks single
2011	The Serpent Carries Him Back Into Paradise	Hospital Productions	Cassette	4-track split EP with Contrepoison (2 tracks each)
2011	Mural of Saddam	Hospital Productions	Cassette	3-tracks EP
2011	Yemeni Commandos	Hospital Productions	Cassette	2-tracks EP
2012	Kuwaiti Airforce	Hospital Productions	Cassette, Vinyl 12" Remaster (2019)	2-tracks EP
2012	Operation Neptune Spear	Hospital Productions	Cassette, Digital	3-tracks EP
2012	Iraqi Praetorian Guard	Hospital Productions	Vinyl 12"	3-tracks EP
2012	September Cell	Hospital Productions	Vinyl 12"	4-tracks EP
2012	Jordanian Descent	Hospital Productions	Cassette	2-tracks single
2013	When You Are Crawling	Hospital Productions	Digital, CD, Vinyl 12"	4-tracks EP
2014	April Silencer	Hospital Productions	Digital	2-tracks EP
2014	Easing of Our Task	Hospital Productions	Digital	4-tracks EP
2014	Elohim City	Hospital Productions	Digital	3-tracks EP
2014	Enduring Mysteries	Hospital Productions	Digital	3-tracks EP
2014	Fireball	Hospital Productions	Digital	3-tracks EP
2014	Oklahoma Military Academy	Hospital Productions	Digital	4-tracks EP
2017	Luxor Necropolitics	Hospital Productions	Digital, Vinyl 2x10", Vinyl 12" (2023 Remaster)	5-tracks EP
2017	Vatican Shadow / Ancient Methods - Bunkerterror	Hospital Productions	Digital, Vinyl 2x10"	2-tracks split with Ancient Methods
2017	Rubbish of the Floodwaters	Ostgut Ton	Digital, Vinyl 12"	3-tracks EP
2018	Volta Forte Remixes	Hospital Productions	Digital	2-tracks EP
2019	Opium Crop Airstrikes	Hospital Productions	Digital, Cassette, Vinyl 12"	3-track EP
2020	Temple Gas Mask	Hospital Productions	Digital	5-track split EP with Salford Electronics

==== Compilations ====
Year	Title	Label	Format	Notes
2011	Washington Buries Al Qaeda Leader at Sea: Decks 1-3	Hospital Productions	Lossless Digital	
2012	It Stands to Conceal	Hospital Productions	Vinyl 12", Digital	Compilation of Jordanian Descent, Ghosts of Chechnya and Atta's Apartment Slated for Demolition
2014	Death Is Unity With God	Hospital Productions, Modern Love Records	Cassette, Vinyl LP, CD	Compilation of Fireball, Enduring Mysteries, Easing of Our Task, Oklahoma Military Academy, Elohim City and April Silencer

=== As Rainforest Spiritual Enslavement ===
==== Studio albums ====
- Papua Land Where Spirits Still Rule (2012)
- Folklore Venom (2013)
- Green Graves (2016)
- Ambient Black Magic (2017)
- Red Ants Genesis (2018)
- Simulated Thunderstorm (2019)
- Flying Fish Ambience (2021)
- Gray Eucalyptus Tranquility (2023)
- Killer Whale Atmospheres (2023)
- Evil Green (2026)
- Hammerhead Change Of Scenery (2026)

==== EPs ====
- The Plant with Many Faces (2013)
- Black Magic Cannot Cross Water (2013)
- Water Rose Above the Head (2013)
- Venus Flytrap Exotica (2019)
- Panama Canal Left-Hand Path (2019)
- Jellyfish Reproduce Black Magic (2021)
- Saga Of Capsizing Dolphins (2022)

==== Compilations ====
- Water Witches (2017)
- Seashell Altars (2021)

=== As Christian Cosmos ===
==== Studio albums ====
- Enthronement by God as the First-Born of the Dead (2012)

==== EPs ====
- Cadence upon the Threshold of Judgement (2012)
- The Sharp Lines That Delineate His Robes (2012)
- Which Echo Again and Again (2012)

=== As Exploring Jezebel ===
==== Studio albums ====
- On a Business Trip to London (2015)

=== As a contributor/guest artist ===
Year	Artist	Title	Credits
2011	Cold Cave	Cherish the Light Years	Electronics on "Pacing Around the Church", "Catacombs", and "Burning Sage"
2017	Cavalera Conspiracy	Psychosis	Synthesizer on "Spectral War", "Hellfire" and "Excruciating"
2017	Power Trip	Nightmare Logic	Introduction on "Waiting Around to Die" (as Prurient)
2018	Oneohtrix Point Never	Age Of	Voice on "Babylon", "Warning", and "Same" (as Prurient)
