= Emil Beaulieau =

American noise musician

Emil Beaulieau, or more fully, “Emil Beaulieau: America’s Greatest Living Noise Artist” (born July 5, 1957) is the stage name of Ron Lessard, a prominent noise musician who primarily records for his own label: RRRecords. He has collaborated and performed with many well-known noise artists, including Merzbow, Pain Jerk, Richard Ramirez from Black Leather Jesus and Sonic Disorder. Beaulieau frequently performs with a custom-made four-armed turntable named the Minutoli after its creator, a friend of the artist. Dressed in his trademark pink dress shirt, tie, and grey cardigan, Emil Beaulieau acts out comical performances.

Emil Beaulieau is also believed to have been the first to have applied the LAYLAH Records term “anti-record” to musical records which have been treated (melted, drilled, painted, etc.) so that they become noise records. While something like this had been done by experimental artists for several decades, it wasn't until Emil’s release of a series of such records (Billboard Combat, Metastasis; Due Process, Do Nothing and many more) that these (anti-)art pieces were widely called anti-records.

He was formerly married to Maria Moran, the American multimedia artist also known as Zipper Spy.

== Minutoli ==
The Minutoli is a phonograph turntable modified to support multiple (usually four) tone arms. The tone arms may be used independently and/or in combinations at the operator's discretion. The result is generally a unique performance, due to the random positions available. The device is mostly associated with Noise performer Emil Beaulieau as an instrument employed in his stage acts. It was invented by his friend, Michael Minutoli.

== Discography ==
=== Albums ===
- Memories (Pure, 1994)
- Kill the All-Noise Japanese Artists (Pure, 1995)
- Dedicated to Charlie Ward (Pure, 1995)
- Dedicated to Masami Akita (Pure, 1995)
- Dedicated to Richard Rupenus (Pure, 1995)
- Emil Beaulieau Has a Relapse (RRRecords, 1997)
- Abusing the Little Ones (Self Abuse Records, 2003)
- Live in WNY (Carbon Records, 2005)
- America's Greatest Noise (Harbinger Sound, 2005)
- Moonlight in Vermont (RRRecords, 2005)
- In the Pale Moon Light (Palemoon Productions, 2011)
- One Man Penis / One Man Buttocks (menstrualrecordings, 2012)
- Driven to Extremes (Fylkingen Records, 2013)
- Polio (Hospital Productions, 2020)

=== Collaborations ===
- 5th Anniversary Boxset Thing (with Due Process and Merzbow, RRRecords, 1989)
- Live in Chicago (with Merzbow, RRRecords, 1991)
- Decollaboration (with Pain Jerk, AMP, 1996)
- Stormy Weather / Poisoned Moment (with Richard Ramirez, RRRecords, 2002)
- Split (with Armenia, Bizarre Audio Arts, 2003)
- Bigfoot Tour 2005 Free CDR (with IDX1274 and Ctrl-Alt-Del, RRRecords / 13 Miles Out, 2005)
- 2005 Tour LP (with Jessica Rylan and John Wiese, RRRecords, 2005)
- Live @ The Detour - September 5, 2004 (with The Earwigs, RRRecords / Xeno-Terrestrial Spacing Guild Mafia, 2006)
- We Are the Professionals (with Rubbish, RRRecords, release year unknown)
