= Through the Window =

Studio album by Prurient
- Released: March 19, 2013
- Recorded: October 1–7, 2011
- Genre: Techno, noise
- Length: 31:42
- Label: Blackest Ever Black
- Producer: Dominick Fernow, Kris Lapke

Prurient chronology
Worship Is the Cleansing of the Imagination (2012)	Through the Window (2013)	Washed Against the Rocks (2014)

Professional ratings
Aggregate scores
Source	Rating
Metacritic	77/100
Review scores
Source	Rating
AllMusic	4/5 stars
Exclaim!	7/10
Pitchfork	7.4/10.0

Through the Window is an album by the American music project Prurient, a performing name of artist Dominick Fernow. The three-song album was released on March 19, 2013 through the English label Blackest Ever Black. Though released in 2013, the tracks for Through the Window were recorded in October 2011 at the same time as Prurient's two Hydra Head Records releases — the studio album Bermuda Drain (2011) and the EP Time's Arrow (2011) — and were noted for musically showing more techno influences, akin to one of Fernow's other projects, Vatican Shadow.

== Track listing ==
1. "Through the Window" – 17:40
2. "Terracotta Spine" – 3:51
3. "You Show Great Spirit" – 10:11

== Personnel ==
Through the Window personnel adapted from AllMusic.

=== Music ===
- Dominick Fernow

=== Production ===
- Matt Colton – cut
- Dominick Fernow – producing
- Kris Lapke – engineering, mastering, mixing, producing

=== Artwork and packaging ===
- Tim Cadiente – photography
- Dominick Fernow – art direction
- Juan Mendez – photography
- Nikolai Saveliev – art direction
- Oliver Smith – design
