= Tesco Organisation =

Independent German record label

- Founded: 1987
- Founder: Joachim Kohl; Klaus Hilger
- Genre: Industrial
- Country of origin: Germany
- Official website: Tesco Organization Germany

Tesco Organisation is a German record label, mail order company and distributor, specialising in industrial, noise, neofolk and ambient music. Tesco has also organised music festivals in the past such as "Heavy Electronics", "Tesco Disco" and "Festival Karlsruhe"

== History ==
=== Formation ===
Tesco Organisation started as a mail order company in 1987 releasing music from the Industrial music genre. The organisation had noticed there was a gap between the music they liked and what was being released by other record labels. In 1989 the label released their first Genocide Organ album, titled "Leichenlinie". Shortly after this release, Tesco expanded and created their sub-label, Functional Organisation, primarily for the re-release of unknown cassette recordings. The label's early releases were packaged in special covers such as oversized card folders and sleeves, influenced by the LP covers of the band Zoviet France. Early releases were recorded by the organisations members and their friends. The music Tesco wanted to release was in the style of earlier Industrial bands like Throbbing Gristle and Lustmord.

=== Principles ===
The organisation does not involve itself in any PR, but instead lets its artists speak on their behalf. The artists who release recordings on the organisation's record label all have something in common with Tesco. The organisation's members stay neutral and support their recording artist's views. Tesco states that they have no visible ideology, instead expressing a fascination for other people who are outspoken and direct; no matter what politics they follow. They express an enjoyment of the aesthetics of decay and the decline of the Western world. They state that when living in a country where you are not allowed to own any nationalism you have a lot to criticize.

== Notable artists ==
- African Imperial Wizard
- Anenzephalia
- Bocksholm
- Bøltorn
- Brighter Death Now
- Browning Mummery
- Genocide Organ
- Intrinsic Action
- Janitor
- Kraang
- Last Dominion Lost
- Daniel Menche
- Of the Wand & the Moon
- Post Scriptvm
- Prurient
- Richard Ramirez
- Smell & Quim
- Sonne Hagal
- Throbbing Gristle
- Trepaneringsritualen
- Vromb
