= Death Is Unity With God =

Studio album by Vatican Shadow
- Released: May 31, 2014
- Recorded: 2014
- Genre: Post-industrial; experimental; electronic; lo-fi; techno; ambient
- Length: 151:03
- Label: Hospital Productions; Modern Love
- Producer: Dominick Fernow

Vatican Shadow chronology
Games Have Rules (2014)	Death Is Unity With God (2014)	Media in the Service of Terror (2016)

Death Is Unity With God is a studio album by American experimental musician Dominick Fernow under one of his aliases, Vatican Shadow, released on May 31, 2014 as a cassette box set on Hospital Productions and later reissued as an album in February 2015 and on June 11, 2015 on Modern Love.

== Background and concept ==
Death Is Unity With God is composed of six EPs that were originally released digitally, out of order, on Fernow's record label Hospital Productions, then issued as cassettes in the form of a box set, and finally issued on vinyl and CD as a complete album. The EPs were Fireball, Enduring Mysteries, Easing of Our Task, Oklahoma Military Academy, Elohim City, and April Silencer. They follow a non-fictional narrative inspired by three major events that occurred in the United States in the first half of the 1990s: the Gulf War, the Waco siege, and the Oklahoma City bombing.

Being an entirely instrumental album, the track titles of distinct long-form tracks on the album, including the opening track "Al Qaeda (Branch Davidian)" and the closing track "Waco Postmortem (Murrah)", as well as other individual tracks, reference the events to push forward the narrative, a technique that has been compared to British ethnic electronica musician Muslimgauze (who Fernow has addressed as being the inspiration for the Vatican Shadow project).

== Composition ==
Differentiating it from other Vatican Shadow albums, the album has a raw, "feral and burned-out" lo-fi musical aesthetic that often makes use of distortion and tape hiss. In its review of the album, record distributor Boomkat noted its "oppressive atmospheres and destroyed rhythms", and said track 17, "McVeigh Figure", drew "aesthetic[al] lines between ambient black metal, Coil and early Autechre".

== Track listing ==
No.	Title	Length
1.	"Al Qaeda (Branch Davidian)"	25:59
2.	"Desert Storm (Waco)"	7:57
3.	"It’s To Come"	13:13
4.	"ATF Sinful Messiah"	14:02
5.	"FBI God"	8:35
6.	"Koresh Babylon"	5:09
7.	"Fort Hood Again"	0:47
8.	"Koresh Lamb"	3:56
9.	"Machine-Gunning Of The Davidians"	0:17
10.	"Texarkana Resistance"	5:25
11.	"Theology Is Life And Death (Pakistan)"	5:31
12.	"Descended On Guayanilla (CNN)"	3:56
13.	"Arms of Yahweh"	5:16
14.	"Manufactured Silencers Under Direct Orders"	4:16
15.	"Living On And Off At The Shadows Motel"	6:50
16.	"Small Explosives and Blasting Caps in the Pages of a Phonebook"	7:06
17.	"McVeigh Figure"	13:37
18.	"Shadows On The Courthouse Wall"	9:48
19.	"Waco Postmortem (Murrah)"	9:12
Total length:		151:03

== Personnel ==
- Production, engineering and arrangements - Dominick Fernow
