= Anenzephalia =

Noise music project by Brigant Moloch

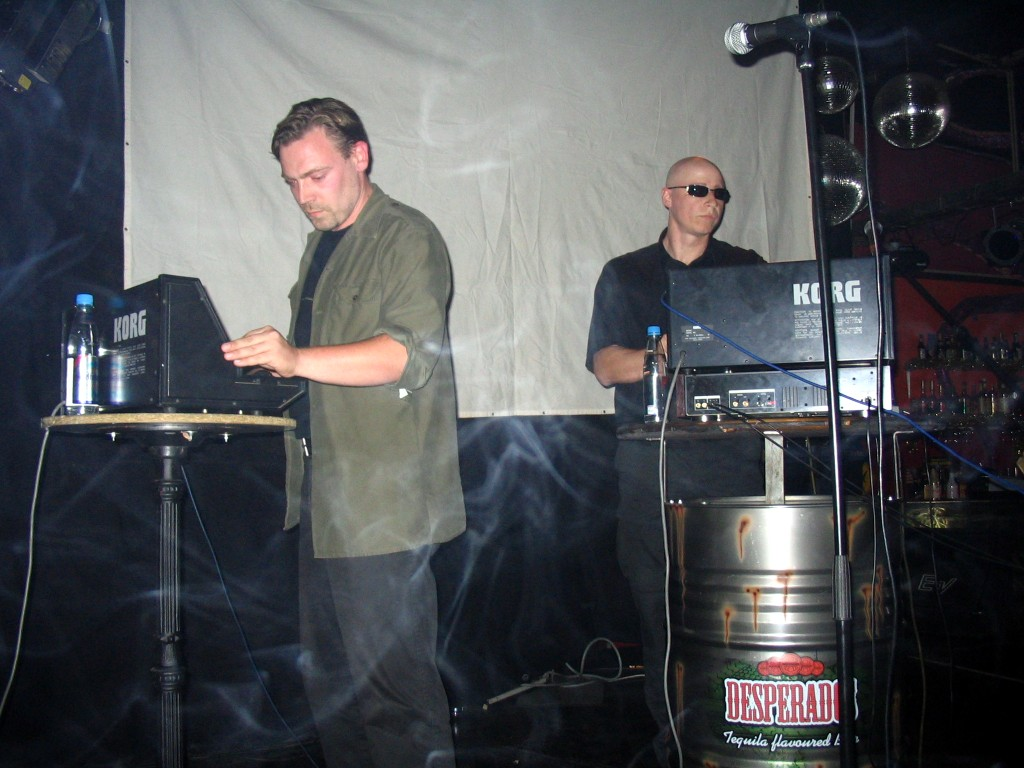
Anenzephalia live-performance

Anenzephalia is the pen name of noise musician B. Moloch, who is occasionally joined by Wilhelm Herich of Genocide Organ. Anenzephalia was one of the first projects to record for the Tesco Organisation label.

== Partial discography ==
- Lyse 7" (Tesco Organisation, 1993)
- Fragments of Demise LP (RRRecords, 1993)
- Ephemeral Dawn CD (Tesco Organisation, 1995, reissued in 2007)
- New World Disorder EP (Tesco Organisation, 1998)
- Anenzephalia CD (Death Factory, 2001)
- Die Sender Müssen Schweigen 10" (Power & Steel, 2002)
- Noehaem LP/CD (Tesco Organisation / Zaetraom, 2003)
- Untitled split CD with Operation Cleansweep and Inade (Teito Sound Company, 2007)
- Projected void 7" (Tesco Organisation / Zaetraom, 2008)
- Kaltwelt LP/CD (Tesco Organisation / Zaetraom, 2012)
