= Troubled Sleep (album) =

Studio album by Prurient
- Released: September 2003
- Recorded: 2001
- Genre: Harsh noise
- Length: 28:49
- Label: Truculent Recordings
- Producer: Dominick Fernow

Prurient chronology
Recycled Music (2003)	Troubled Sleep (2003)	We Set Off in High Spirits (2003)

Troubled Sleep is a studio album by American experimental musician Dominick Fernow under his alias Prurient, released in September 2003 as a limited edition CD on Truculent Recordings.

== Background and composition ==
Troubled Sleep was originally recorded in the late winter of 2001, before being officially released in September 2003. The entirety of the album's lyrics are adapted from Jean Feraca's Crossing the Great Divide (1992), with the album being bookended by different readings of the same poem on the opening track, "Bolt" and the closing track, "Tarantella". The album also makes use of samples of both movements from Arvo Pärt's Tabula Rasa, albeit mixed to be faintly audible under the album's overall use of severely clipped high and low frequencies.

The album's mastering, a trademark of Fernow's production style and overall noise ethic, is noticeably extremely clipped, and its DC offset is at times in the album intentionally brickwalled. Due to this, in an anomalous case of Prurient's albums being digitally distributed, the album is nearly incapable of being properly listened to on Spotify, as it amounts to faint white noise.

== Track listing ==
No.	Title	Length
1.	"Bolt"	4:17
2.	"Lock"	1:29
3.	"Shades"	1:33
4.	"Troubled Sleep"	3:10
5.	"Glass"	3:01
6.	"The Zealot"	3:40
7.	"Tambourine"	4:11
8.	"Tarantella"	7:23
Total length:		28:49

== Personnel ==
Credits adapted from Discogs.

- Lyrics - Jean Feraca
- Photography, sounds, design - Dominick Fernow
