= Frozen Niagara Falls =

Album by Prurient

Studio album by Prurient
- Released: May 12, 2015
- Recorded: Winter 2013 – winter 2015 in New York City
- Genre: Noise; power electronics; ambient
- Length: 91:34
- Label: Profound Lore (PFL–152)
- Producer: Dominick Fernow; Kris Lapke; Arthur Rizk

Prurient chronology
| Washed Against the Rocks (2014) | Frozen Niagara Falls (2015) | Unknown Rains (2016) |

Frozen Niagara Falls is a double album by the American musical project Prurient, the performing name of Dominick Fernow. It was released on May 12, 2015, through Profound Lore Records. Leading up to its official release date, Frozen Niagara Falls was promoted with online streams of "Dragonflies to Sew You Up" and "Greenpoint".

Primarily a noise album, the work features melodies and some limited percussion, both of which are elements that are unusual and very rare for the genre.

== Background and composition ==
Fernow originally intended to create Frozen Niagara Falls with sounds from non-musical acoustic sources with no electronics at all, including materials being broken and destroyed. Regarding the concept, he said in an interview with The Quietus:

"Not acoustic instruments in particular but any acoustic sound we could generate, even at a high volume. Things being destroyed, rocks being cracked in half and hurled around and that kind of stuff ... I felt I kind of needed a necessity to try and return to the idea of noise committed with the physical."

The album was originally conceived in Italy and was eventually recorded in New York City, in what Fernow deemed "spirit of homelessness".

== Critical reception ==
Professional ratings
Aggregate scores
| Source | Rating |
|---|---|
| Metacritic | 84/100 |
Review scores
| Source | Rating |
| AllMusic | 3.5/5 stars |
| Alternative Press | 4/5 stars |
| Pitchfork | 8.5/10.0 |
| Revolver | 4/5 |
| Spin | 8/10 |
| Sputnikmusic | 4/5 |

Frozen Niagara Falls received positive feedback. At Metacritic (a review aggregator site which assigns a normalized rating out of 100 from music critics), based on 16 critics, the album has received a score of 84/100, indicating "universal acclaim". Pitchfork wrote that "With Niagara, he's taken strengths from his entire oeuvre to reach deeper into himself and produce what may be his best record yet, one that brings all the fulfillment of noise and transcends them all the same. [...] He offers an endless, probing self-exploration that simply isn't found in noise, metal, hardcore, power electronics, whatever harsh music you can think of."

The Quietus were positive in their assessment of the album, writing that "Rushing static, distant growls, and harsh noises duel on top of the dramatic central theme, yet it remains more beautiful and tragic than harsh or angry. It's a compellingly emotional and driven tone that permeates several of the album's key tracks."

== Track listing ==
Music arranged by Dominick Fernow, Kris Lapke and Arthur Rizk; lyrics by Fernow.

Disc 1
| No. | Title | Length |
|---|---|---|
| 1. | "Myth of Building Bridges" | 10:17 |
| 2. | "Dragonflies to Sew You Up" | 5:19 |
| 3. | "A Sorrow with a Braid" | 4:53 |
| 4. | "Every Relationship Earthrise" | 3:13 |
| 5. | "Traditional Snowfall" | 5:16 |
| 6. | "Jester in Agony" | 7:14 |
| 7. | "Poinsettia Pills" | 3:16 |
| 8. | "Shoulders of Summerstones" | 5:16 |
| Total length: | | 44:46 |

Disc 2
| No. | Title | Length |
|---|---|---|
| 1. | "Wildflowers (Long Hair with Stocking Cap)" | 0:32 |
| 2. | "Greenpoint" | 10:09 |
| 3. | "Lives Torn Apart (NYC)" | 3:23 |
| 4. | "Frozen Niagara Falls (Portion One)" | 7:02 |
| 5. | "Cocaine Daughter" | 5:01 |
| 6. | "Falling Mask" | 1:57 |
| 7. | "Frozen Niagara Falls (Portion Two)" | 7:19 |
| 8. | "Christ Among the Broken Glass" | 11:21 |
| Total length: | | 46:47 91:34 |

== Personnel ==
Frozen Niagara Falls adapted from CD liner notes.

Music and lyrics

- Jean Feraca – additional lyric editing
- Dominick Fernow – arranging, lyrics
- Kris Lapke – arranging; additional: synthesizer, electronics, fretless bass, field recording, percussion
- Jim Mroz – additional field recording
- Arthur Rizk – arranging; additional: electric guitar, twelve-string guitar, acoustic guitar, fretless bass, field recording, percussion

Production

- Paul Corley – mastering
- Dominick Fernow – production, mixing
- Kris Lapke – production, mixing
- Arthur Rizk – production, mixing

Artwork and packaging

- Becka Diamond – cover photography, additional photography
- Dominick Fernow – art direction, design, additional photography
- Adam Gordon – untitled sculpture and painting
- Matt Kenny – comedy masks
- Adam Marnie – red cross
- Nikolay Saveliev – art direction, design
- Scott Bryan Wilson – additional text editing
