= Rainbow Mirror =

Studio album by Prurient
- Released: December 1, 2017
- Genre: Noise; industrial; drone; ambient
- Length: 180:42 (vinyl release); 200:17 (CD and digital release)
- Label: Profound Lore (PFL–197)
- Producer: Shifted

Prurient chronology
| Unknown Rains (2016) | Rainbow Mirror (2017) | Garden of the Mutilated Paratroopers (2019) |

Rainbow Mirror is a triple album by the American musical project Prurient, the performing name of the artist Dominick Fernow. It was released on December 1, 2017 through Profound Lore Records. Coinciding with the 20th anniversary of the Prurient project, Rainbow Mirror was released as a 4xCD (the fourth being a bonus disc) and as a 7xLP, which was distributed by Hospital Productions. This Hospital Productions release bundled Rainbow Mirror with a limited cassette version of Godflesh's 2017 album, Post Self. The 8-panel digipak version of the album includes a short story by Fernow and Scott Bryan Wilson.

== Critical reception ==
Professional ratings
Aggregate scores
| Source | Rating |
|---|---|
| Metacritic | 72/100 |
Review scores
| Source | Rating |
| The 405 | 7.5/10 |
| Exclaim! | 8/10 |
| Pitchfork | 6.2/10 |
| Resident Advisor | 3.7/5 |

Rainbow Mirror was met with mostly positive reviews. The album received an average score of 72/100 from 5 reviews on Metacritic, indicating "generally favorable reviews". Writing for Exclaim!, Brayden Turenne said, "despite occasionally overlong runtimes, Rainbow Mirror is an album that encourages introspection and submerging oneself in their unconscious. It's a monument that both inspires and terrifies." In a mixed review for the album, Louis Pattison of Pitchfork wrote, "for all its imposing scale, though, it lacks some of the dramatic finesse of classic Prurient." Pattison also criticized the lack of vocals from Fernow, saying the lyrical void makes the songs lack character. Andrew Ryce of Resident Advisor wrote, "At over three hours of half-lidded drone and ambient, Rainbow Mirror is one of the quietest Prurient albums, yet also one of the most demanding."

== Track listing ==
Disc 1
| No. | Title | Length |
|---|---|---|
| 1. | "Barefoot God" | 5:38 |
| 2. | "Walking on Dehydrated Coral" | 11:12 |
| 3. | "Midnight Kabar" | 8:50 |
| 4. | "Chaos – Sex" | 14:39 |
| Total length: | | 40:19 |

Disc 2
| No. | Title | Length |
|---|---|---|
| 1. | "Falling in the Water" | 15:22 |
| 2. | "Okinawan Burial Vaults" | 17:45 |
| 3. | "April Fool's Day Aspect Sinister" | 17:33 |
| 4. | "Cruel Worlds" | 15:20 |
| Total length: | | 66:00 106:19 |

Disc 3
| No. | Title | Length |
|---|---|---|
| 1. | "Naturecum" | 14:27 |
| 2. | "Blue Kimono Over Corpse" | 15:08 |
| 3. | "Path Is Short" | 16:00 |
| 4. | "Buddha Strangled in Vines (Part One)" | 9:56 |
| 5. | "Buddha Strangled in Vines (Part Two)" | 18:52 |
| Total length: | | 74:23 180:42 |

Disc 4 (bonus)
| No. | Title | Length |
|---|---|---|
| 1. | "Lazarus Flamethrower Sleepwalk" | 10:12 |
| 2. | "Buddhist State" | 9:23 |
| Total length: | | 19:35 200:17 |

== Personnel ==
Credits adapted from liner notes.

Music

- Dominick Fernow – arranging, music
- Jim Mroz – music
- Matt Folden – music

Additional personnel

- Paul Corley – mastering
- Shifted – production, mixing
