= Nihilist Records =

Record label

Nihilist Recordings is a record label that releases noise music albums, and is similar to labels like Load Records and Hanson Records, though it tends to release bands that are more controversial or offensive in a sensational manner. Nihilist manages to separate itself from these labels due to its eclectic roster which spans the genres of neo-folk, acoustic, absurdist, musique concrete and dark disco. Founded in 1992 with the release of a two cassettes (Pound Of Flesh and Panicsville), though these are not featured in any official discographies making them all the more rare.

The label was founded by Andy Ortmann in St Louis initially to release music by his own band, Panicsville. It has since released albums by major and minor noise artists like Costes, Cock E.S.P., Pound of Flesh, the Broken Penis Orchestra, Mlehst, John Wiese, Andy Ortmann, Brain Transplant, Inflatable Alterboys, Strangulated Beatoffs, Runzelstirn & Gurgelstock, Mammal, Death Squad, Wolf Eyes, Thurston Moore, Nondor Nevai, Fashion Dictator, Schimpfluch Commune and Zipper Spy.

Nihilist also released a trilogy of tribute albums to pop music groups ABBA, Madonna and the B-52's.

== See also ==
- List of record labels
