= Riley Gale =

American heavy metal vocalist (1986–2020)

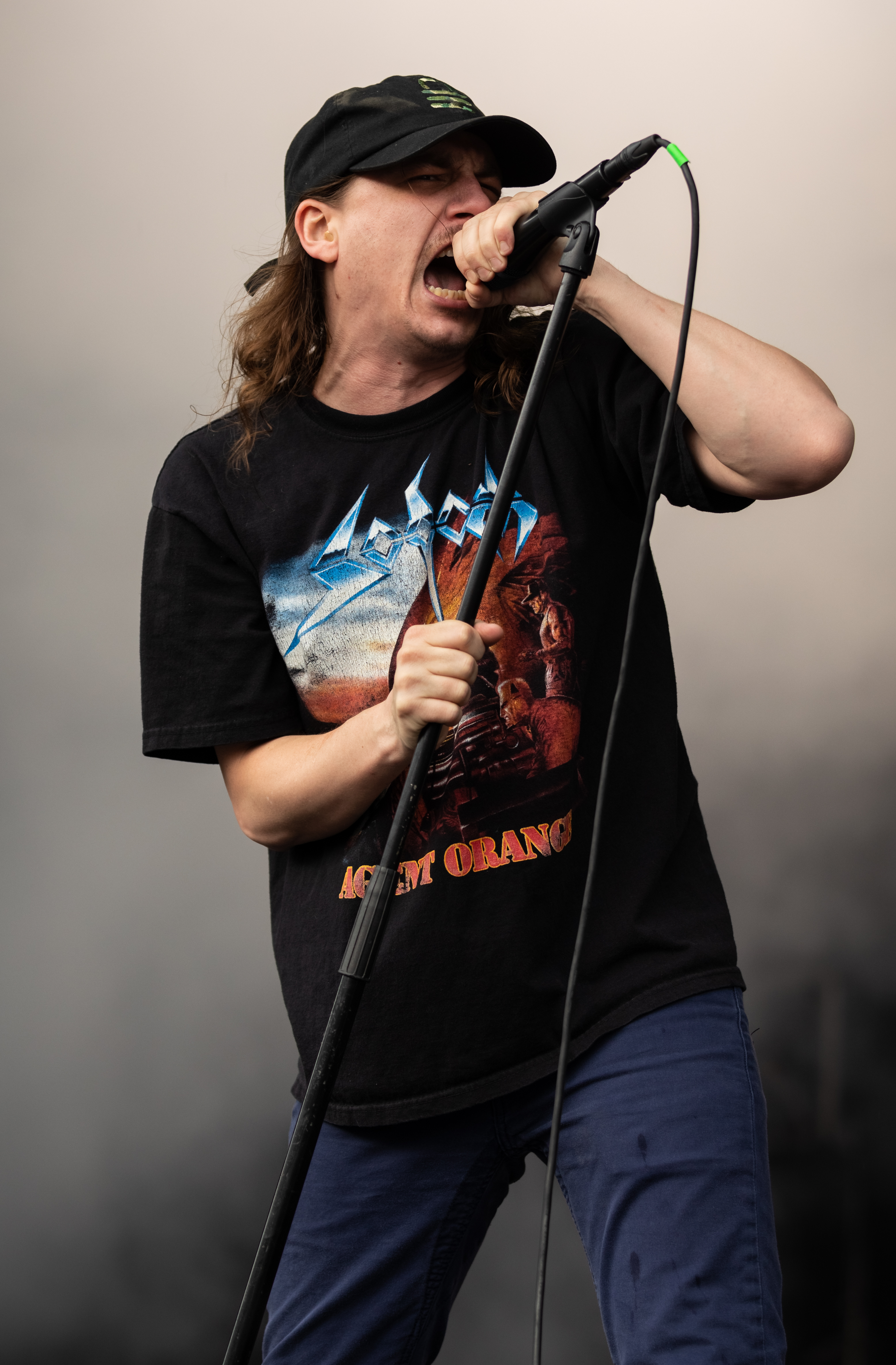
- Gale in 2019

Background information
- Born: April 30, 1986; Dallas, Texas, U.S.
- Died: August 25, 2020 (aged 34) Dallas, Texas, U.S.
- Genres: Thrash metal; crossover thrash; hardcore punk
- Occupations: Singer; songwriter
- Instrument: Vocals
- Years active: 2005–2020
- Formerly of: Power Trip

Riley Gale (April 30, 1986 – August 25, 2020) was an American singer and songwriter who founded and performed with crossover thrash band Power Trip as its lead vocalist. Gale co-founded the band in 2008; with him as songwriter and vocalist, Power Trip released two well-received studio albums, in addition to multiple singles and EPs. He was known for his harsh, growled vocals, intense stage presence, and outspoken progressive politics, which he wove into his lyrics.

Gale was found unresponsive in his home in Dallas, Texas, on August 25, 2020; he had died due to an accidental overdose of fentanyl the night before. He was remembered by his peers for his talent as a vocalist and lyricist, his potent social commentary, and his kindness and compassion. As a member of Power Trip, he was posthumously nominated for a Grammy Award for Best Metal Performance.

== Early life ==
Riley Gale was born April 30, 1986, in Dallas, Texas, to businessman Brandon Gale and his wife, Gina. His parents met in Dearborn, Michigan, in the 1970s and moved to Dallas in 1980. Gale was the first of four children; he had two younger brothers, Zachary and Dylan, and a younger sister, Sarah. His father recalled playing classical music for Gale while he was still in the womb.

As a child, Gale was remembered as being mischievous and noted for his anti-authoritarian attitude. His father claimed that Gale frequently had difficulty accepting guidance from his parents and teachers. Conversely, he was also described as kind and compassionate to his peers, as well as a voracious reader. He was further noted as the type of young man who confronted bullies in school and volunteered at soup kitchens. Physically, he was an undersized child who eventually accepted his size and found success in taekwondo competitions. He also lived in San Diego during his youth.

In a 2021 interview, Gale's father theorized that he and his wife were responsible for Gale's musical interest, claiming that he grew up surrounded by classic rock and Motown. During his youth, Gale became an avid fan of multiple genres of music, ranging from metal and hardcore to soul, and was deeply knowledgeable regarding the subject. Gale graduated from the Jesuit College Preparatory School of Dallas in 2004; despite the anti-religious sentiments he developed later in his life, he described it as a positive experience. He graduated from the University of North Texas in 2010.

== Career ==
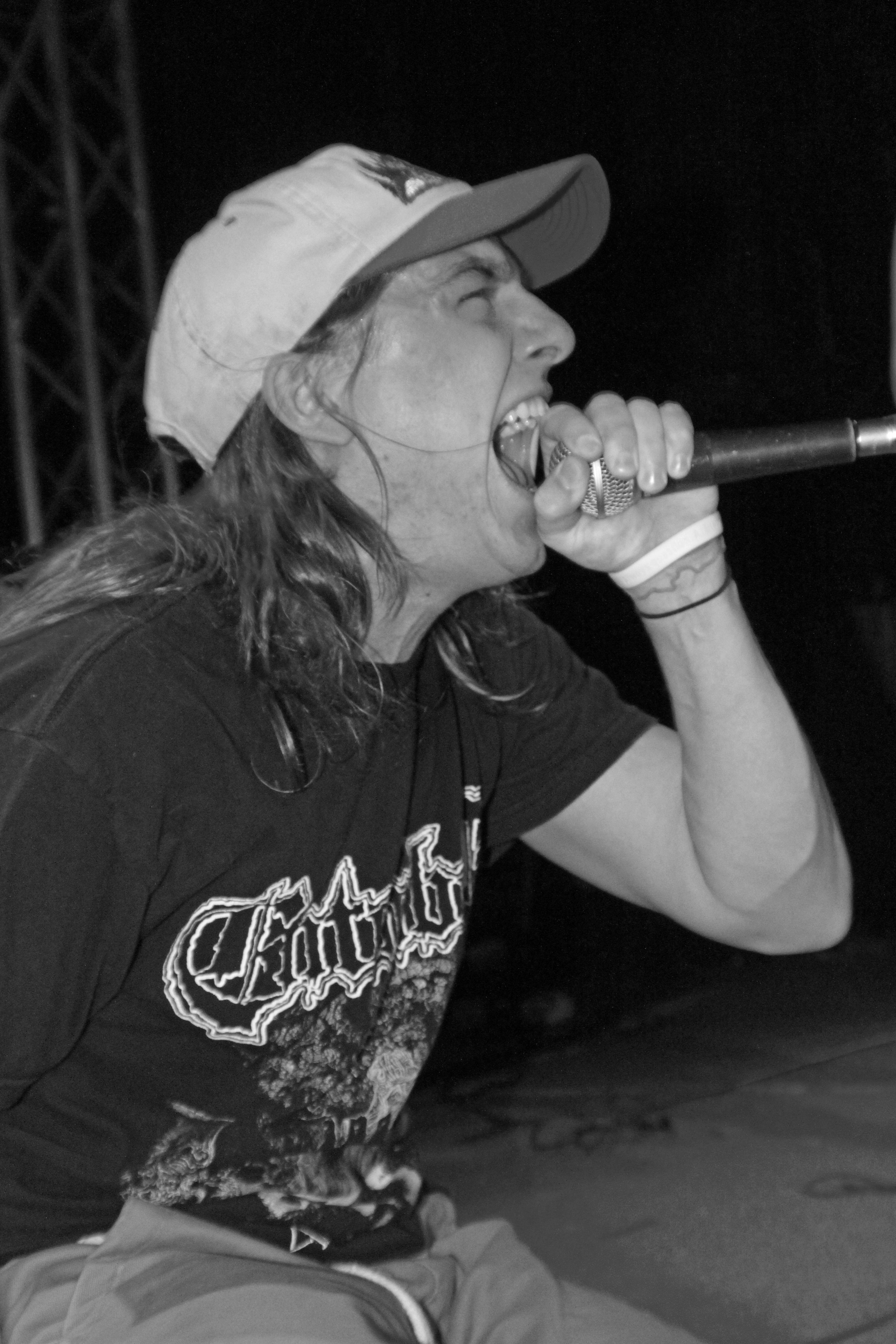
Gale in 2010

=== Balls Out ===
Before the founding of Power Trip in 2008, Gale was the vocalist for Balls Out, a Dallas-based hardcore band, which he started when he was 17. The band began performing after Gale petitioned booker Tyler Berry for the opportunity to open for punk band Kids Like Us. Berry described Gale as a charismatic "little dude" who naturally attracted people towards him. With Gale as its frontman, Balls Out reached a level where it was able to leave Texas and tour out-of-state.

=== Power Trip ===
Gale met guitarist Blake Ibanez, whose band Reality Check had previously opened for Balls Out, after Ibanez responded to Gale's online post regarding his idea for a band. The two began to message each other through Myspace, discussing their similar musical interests. They convened in person to jam and later recorded an initial demo in Richardson, Texas, in 2008. Joined by guitarist Nick Stewart and Chris Whetzel from Reality Check, the band began performing around the Dallas-Fort Worth area as Power Trip. The initial influences of the band were East Coast hardcore groups such as Cro-Mags; the band also subsequently adopted elements of thrash metal. Originally, Marcus Johnson served as the band's drummer; he would later be replaced by Chris Ulsh.

Power Trip's first official release was the EP Armageddon Blues, released in 2009. In 2011, the band released a self-titled EP. These early releases were heavily inspired by Gale's admiration for New York hardcore and were later compiled into the album Opening Fire: 2008–2014, released in 2018. In 2013, Power Trip released Manifest Decimation, its first studio album with heavy metal record label Southern Lord Records. The album received generally positive reviews; Brandon Stousy of Pitchfork called it "bleak, dirty, heavy...[and] very catchy" and a "great" album. Brad Sanders specifically praised Gale's performance, describing it as "brilliant". Power Trip followed their first album with Nightmare Logic, also released with Southern Lord, in 2017. Nightmare Logic was critically acclaimed; D Magazine called it the band's "masterpiece". Critic Zoe Camp compared Gale's vocals to a "rabid wolf" and praised his politically satirical lyrics.

As Power Trip's frontman, Gale was recognized for his intense, explosive stage performances. Matt Pike of High on Fire referred to him as the "Bon Scott of punk rock" and a "born frontman" in a 2024 interview. His voice was described as "throat-shredded", "jagged", and "feral", exemplifying his harsh vocal style. Additionally, his lyricism was praised due to its relevant social commentary on topics including social inequity. With Power Trip, he maintained a highly active touring schedule; Gale performed at festivals including the Norman Music Festival, Welcome to Rockville, Carolina Rebellion, Heavy Montréal, and the Aftershock Festival, among others. He also toured alongside numerous prominent metal and rock bands, including Anthrax, Lamb of God, Obituary, Trivium, and Cannibal Corpse. Collaborating with Body Count, he co-wrote and performed the song "Point the Finger", released on the 2020 album Carnivore.

== Personal life ==
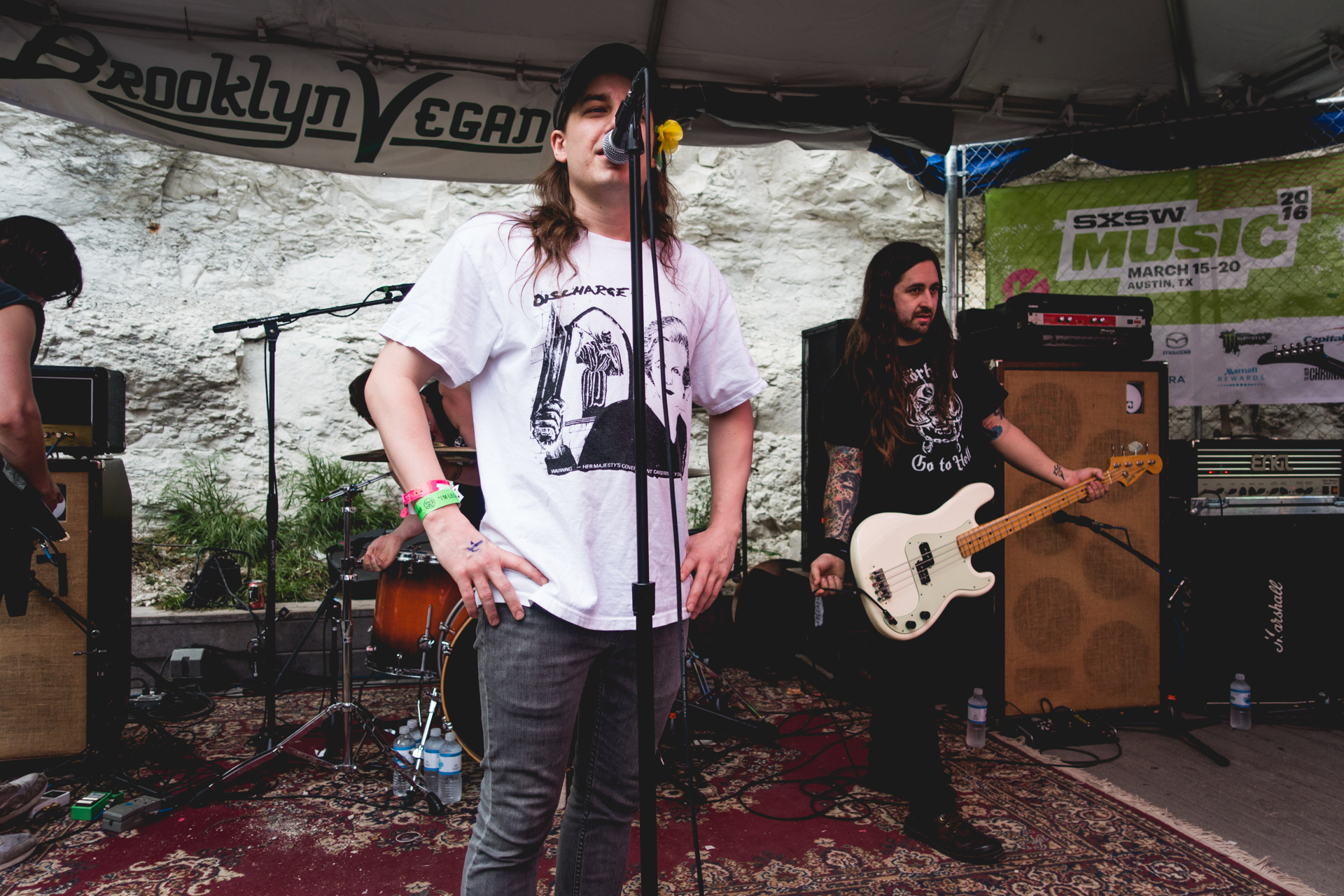
Gale with Power Trip in 2016

Gale was well-known for his progressive political opinions. In 2018, he distanced his music from what he called "weird, racist, meathead[s]". He was critical of religion as a whole, especially organized religion. He often wove his social perspective into his lyrics; for example, the song "If Not Us Then Who" from Nightmare Logic was born from Gale's desire to create a song representing women and minorities. The title of said track is an excerpt of a speech from civil rights activist John Lewis. In June 2020, he expressed his belief that the United States continued to have problems with racism that still needed to be resolved.

Gale believed that society was governed by corporations, the military–industrial complex, and "Big Pharma". Nevertheless, he held the conviction that, as average people heavily outnumbered those he believed to be in power, there would be a day in which the majority revolted against the "1 percent". He often included calls to action in his music, attempting to appeal to whom he perceived as a silent majority. He was frequently described as a kind and considerate person who looked out for vulnerable or weak people.

At the time of his death, Gale lived in Dallas with his girlfriend, Marsella, and his three dogs. He suffered from insomnia and sleep paralysis and had a history of abusing Xanax. The reading habit he had developed as a child continued into his adulthood; according to his father, he would purchase entire boxes of books to read while touring. He also enjoyed reading comic books, and had been compiling a comics anthology featuring the works of some of his personal friends and favorite artists prior to his death. Titled Cicadas, it was published more than three years after he died by Lockin' Out Records.

== Death ==
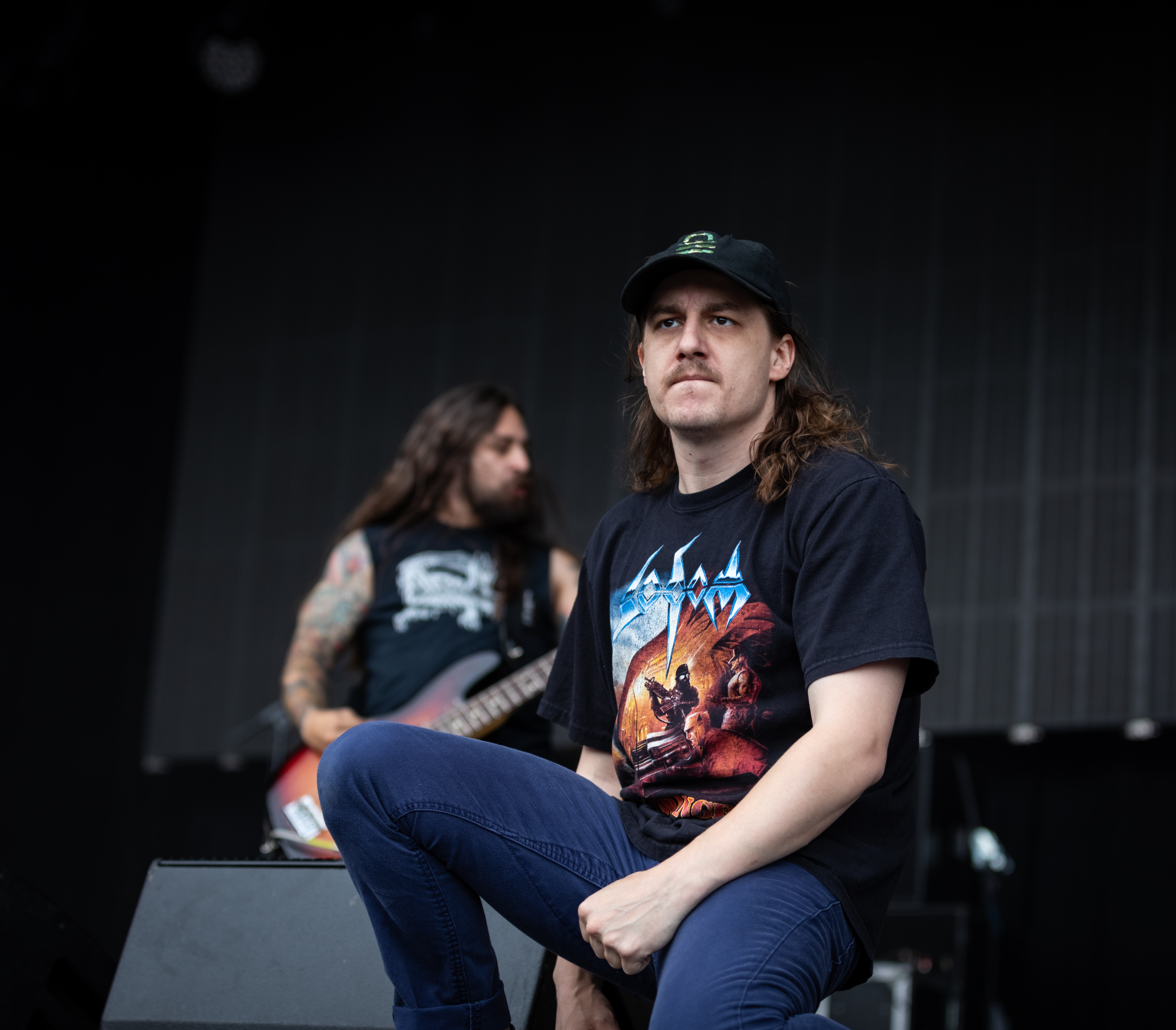
Gale in 2019

On August 25, 2020, Gale died in his sleep at his home in Dallas. He was found on the floor, unresponsive, the following day. A May 2021 report from the Dallas County Medical Examiner's Office found his cause of death to be a pulmonary edema caused by an accidental fentanyl overdose. The report also noted his past use of Xanax, though the only other drug found in his system at the time of his death was marijuana. His death was confirmed by Power Trip through a Facebook post published on August 26; the band's Twitter page also published a statement from Gale's family announcing his death. Power Trip had been in the process of recording a third album at the time.

Gale's death was met with grief, shock, and tributes by many in the music industry, including Ice-T, Randy Blythe, and Jay Weinberg, among many others. Fox News host Greg Gutfeld, who had formed a friendship with Gale despite their drastic political differences, memorialized him on the August 26 edition of The Five. Outside of his musical contributions, he was also remembered for his compassion and kindness. Following Gale's death, his family created the Riley Gale Foundation, which collects donations in support of homeless LGBT youth in Dallas. Dallas Hope Charities also named a transitional home for LGBT youth and a library for Gale. He was posthumously nominated for a Grammy Award for Best Metal Performance as a member of Power Trip for a live version of the song "Executioner's Tax (Swing of the Axe)".

After Gale's death, Power Trip entered a period of uncertainty. Apart from a studio-recorded tribute to Gale with Obituary in March 2021, the band was mostly inactive from 2020 until December 1, 2023, when the band performed live for the first time after his death. His position was filled by vocalist Seth Gilmore, the lead singer of Blake Ibanez's hardcore band Fugitive. The band later announced multiple concerts spread throughout 2024. Following the 2023 performance, Gale's father issued a statement denouncing the fact that he was not informed prior to the show; he later expressed remorse and apologized for the statement.

== Discography ==
=== Guest appearances ===
Year	Group	Title	Track
2019	Bleach Everything	SDK X RFTCC	"On a Rope"
2020	Body Count	Carnivore	"Point the Finger"
2020	Masterpiece Machine	Rotting Fruit / Letting You In On a Secret	"Rotting Fruit", "Letting You In On a Secret"

== See also ==
- Power Trip (band)
