= Arrowhead (album) =

Studio album by Prurient
- Released: July 28, 2008
- Recorded: Winter 2004
- Studios: Providence, Rhode Island, US
- Genre: Noise
- Length: 30:43
- Label: Editions Mego

Prurient chronology
And Still, Wanting (2008)	Arrowhead (2008)	Cocaine Death (2008)

Arrowhead is a studio album by American musician Dominick Fernow under the pseudonym Prurient. It was released on July 28, 2008, through Editions Mego. It received universal acclaim from critics.

== Background ==
Dominick Fernow, better known as Prurient, is an American musician originally from Wisconsin. Arrowhead was recorded in winter 2004 in Providence, Rhode Island, and was finalized in winter 2005 in New York City, New York. The album consists of three tracks ("Sternum", "Ribcage", and "Lungs"), clocking in at 30 minutes. It features a guest appearance from Kris Lapke.

The album was released on July 28, 2008, through Editions Mego.

== Critical reception ==
Professional ratings
Aggregate scores
Source	Rating
Metacritic	83/100
Review scores
Source	Rating
AllMusic	3.5/5 stars
Pitchfork	8.8/10
Prefix	8.0/10
Tiny Mix Tapes	2.5/5 stars

According to the review aggregator Metacritic, Arrowhead received "universal acclaim" based on a weighted average score of 83 out of 100 from 5 critic scores.

François Couture of AllMusic wrote, "Without actually marking a new direction, Arrowhead does open up Prurient's music to a spatial dimension hitherto unsuspected." He added, "It should still satisfy noise fans, but amateurs of sound art will also find it welcoming." Grayson Currin of Pitchfork stated, "Listen for the control Fernow wields over his electronics as he grapples with the tone, letting it slide into chaos only to bring it back under his hand." He added, "There's a violent, lacerating ebb-and-flow to this work that's as nauseating as it is enrapturing."

== Track listing ==
Arrowhead track listing
No.	Title	Length
1.	"Sternum"	12:05
2.	"Ribcage"	14:31
3.	"Lungs"	4:08
Total length:		30:43

== Personnel ==
Credits adapted from liner notes.

- Dominick Fernow – design
- Louder Than Life – recording
- Kris Lapke – guest appearance
