= Manifest Decimation =

Power Trip album

Studio album by Power Trip
- Released: June 11, 2013
- Studios: Solomon's Gate, Philadelphia; SC Recording Studio, Argyle
- Genres: Thrash metal; crossover thrash; hardcore punk
- Length: 34:38
- Label: Southern Lord Recordings
- Producer: Arthur Rizk

Power Trip chronology
| Manifest Decimation (2013) | Nightmare Logic (2017) |

Manifest Decimation is the debut album by American thrash metal band Power Trip. It was released on June 11, 2013 through Southern Lord Recordings. The album is a precursor to Nightmare Logic, which launched them to stardom with their brand of old school thrash metal. The album was produced, engineered, mixed, and mastered by Arthur Rizk (additional tracking done in Argyle, Texas by Daniel Schmuck).

== Background ==
Power Trip is an American thrash metal band that formed in 2008 in Dallas, Texas. Their sound has been described by critics as a cross between thrash metal and hardcore punk, as well as simply crossover thrash. The sound clip at the beginning of "Hammer of Doubt" is from the movie Blood Simple. The clip at the end of "Conditioned To Death" is from Robocop 2.

== Reception ==
Pitchfork writer Brandon Stosuy praised the band's debut album in a positive review of 8.0. Shayne Mathis from Metal Injection also gave the album a positive review. AllMusic reviewer Thom Jurek gave the album 7/10 stars.

== Track listing ==
All tracks written by Power Trip.

| No. | Title | Length |
|---|---|---|
| 1. | "Manifest Decimation" | 4:33 |
| 2. | "Heretic's Fork" | 4:02 |
| 3. | "Conditioned to Death" | 3:22 |
| 4. | "Murderer's Row" | 3:52 |
| 5. | "Crossbreaker" | 3:46 |
| 6. | "Drown" | 4:45 |
| 7. | "Power Trip" | 3:52 |
| 8. | "The Hammer of Doubt" | 6:26 |
| Total length: | | 34:38 |

== Personnel ==
- Riley Gale – vocals
- Blake Ibanez – lead guitar
- Nick Stewart – rhythm guitar
- Chris Whetzel – bass
- Chris Ulsh – drums
