= Executioner's Tax (Swing of the Axe) =

2017 single by Power Trip

Single by Power Trip

from the album Nightmare Logic
- Genre: Thrash metal; crossover thrash
- Length: 3:53
- Label: Southern Lord Records
- Producer: Arthur Rizk

Music video
- "Executioner's Tax (Swing of the Axe)" on YouTube

"Executioner's Tax (Swing of the Axe)" is a 2017 song by American thrash metal band Power Trip, released as the second single from their second studio album Nightmare Logic. According to the song's vocalist Riley Gale, its lyrics are inspired by the practice of paying a fee to executioners in medieval Europe for a painless death, which he applied to the political climate at the time. The song was generally praised by critics, particularly for the performance of Gale and guitarists Blake Ibanez and Nick Stewart. A live version of the song was nominated for a Grammy Award for Best Metal Performance in 2021.

== Background ==
"Executioner's Tax (Swing of the Axe)" was released as the second single of the album Nightmare Logic, ahead of the album's release on 24 February 2017. Like the rest of the album, the single was produced by Arthur Rizk and released by Southern Lord Records. In an interview with the Austin Chronicle, Power Trip vocalist Riley Gale stated that the lyrics were inspired by supposed payments to executioners in medieval Europe to ensure a quick, painless beheading. He likened these payments to modern self-destructive habits, such as the consumption of prescription drugs and junk food.

== Reception ==
"Executioner's Tax (Swing of the Axe)" was generally praised by critics. Zoe Camp of Pitchfork called it the "best song" on Nightmare Logic, referencing Gale's satirical lyrics and guitarist Blake Ibanez's heavy tremolo riffs. In a positive review of Nightmare Logic, PopMatters noted Ibanez and Nick Stewart's "smoldering, napalm-soaked six-string maneuvers" and Gale's "fittingly frightening vocal performance" on the track. Branan Rajanathan of Exclaim! also praised the song's vocals and guitarwork. The song was named the best metal song of the year at the 2017 Loudwire Music Awards. A live version of the song was nominated for a Grammy Award for Best Metal Performance in 2021.

In 2017, television host Greg Gutfeld played the song twice on an episode of The Five, leading the band to issue a "cease and desist" through Twitter. Gale and Gutfeld later had a dialogue following the incident, leading to the two developing a friendship. Members of Power Trip and Obituary recorded a cover of the song as a tribute to Gale following his death in 2020. Additionally, the band Outburst released a cover of the song in 2022, donating all streaming proceeds to the Riley Gale Foundation.

In 2020, Loudwire dubbed it one of the 66 best metal songs of the 21st century. Metal Hammer also ranked it among the 10 best thrash metal songs released from 2000 to 2020. Revolver Magazine called it "one of the true all-timers not just within Power Trip’s catalog, but for metal as a whole."
