= Nightmare Logic =

Studio album by Power Trip
- Released: February 24, 2017
- Studio: Creep Records, Philadelphia; The Echo Lab, Argyle
- Genre: Thrash metal; crossover thrash; hardcore punk
- Length: 32:51
- Label: Southern Lord (LORD236)
- Producer: Arthur Rizk

Power Trip chronology
Manifest Decimation (2013)	Nightmare Logic (2017)	Opening Fire: 2008–2014 (2018)

Nightmare Logic is the second studio album by American thrash metal band Power Trip. It was released on February 24, 2017 through Southern Lord Records and was met with critical acclaim. This marked the second collaboration with producer Arthur Rizk, having previously worked with Rizk on their debut album Manifest Decimation (2013). This is the last Power Trip studio album to feature vocalist Riley Gale before he died on August 24, 2020.

Nightmare Logic was well-received by both critics and fans, and was responsible for bringing Power Trip to the attention of a mainstream metal audience. Critics praised its raw intensity, powerful riffs, as well as the band's growth in songwriting. It has appeared on a number of critics' lists ranking the year's top metal albums, as well as lists ranking the top metal albums of the decade.

== Overview ==
Nightmare Logic was produced by Arthur Rizk and released via record label Southern Lord. Critics have described their sound as thrash metal, hardcore punk, and crossover thrash.

== Reception ==
Professional ratings
Aggregate scores
Source	Rating
Metacritic	86/100
Review scores
Source	Rating
Classic Rock	3.5/5 stars
Exclaim!	9/10
musicOMH	4/5 stars
Pitchfork	8.4/10
PopMatters	8/10 stars
The Quietus	9/10 stars
Record Collector	5/5 stars
Rock Sound	7/10

Nightmare Logic was met with critical acclaim. The album received an average score of 86/100 from 10 reviews on Metacritic, indicating "universal acclaim". Branan Ranjanathan of Exclaim! praised the album, writing, "Nightmare Logic showcases Power Trip at their strongest yet, and packs its 30-minute runtime with songs that push everything they have done right so far to an entirely new level." Writing for The Quietus, Louise Brown said, "This is no retro throwback, Power Trip have poured their genuine, obsessive love of early thrash, but also Cro-Mags, Prong and Black Flag to create a boiling pot of modern metal mastery."

Loudwire named Nightmare Logic as the best metal album of the year, as well as proclaiming Power Trip to be 2017's breakout metal band. The publication would praise the album's intensity, speed, and its tight production, writing "Arthur Rizk's production is entrenched in the old school with raw tones and organic drum sounds that bring the messages condemning power, corruption and greed to the street level. This year belongs to Power Trip and as they boldly declared at the 2017 Loudwire Music Awards, "'Watch out old timers, we're here.'" "Executioner's Tax (Swing of the Axe)" was awarded Best Metal Song at the 2017 Loudwire Music Awards.

In a positive review, Zoe Camp from Pitchfork wrote "Power Trip embody a platonic ideal of heavy metal escapism. With more focus on detail, the Dallas thrashers push their second LP over the edge, balancing modern intricacy and old-school aggression." Richard Beinstock wrote for Rolling Stone in a year-end review "Nightmare Logic gathers the band's source material – hardcore, punk and plenty of Eighties speed metal – and distills it into sharply focused and hooky aggo-blasts." Rolling Stone would go on to name Nightmare Logic the 11th best metal album of the year.

=== Accolades ===
Year	Publication	Country	Accolade	Rank	Ref.
2017	Exclaim!	Canada	"Top 10 Metal and Hardcore Albums"	2	
2017	Loudwire	United States	"25 Best Metal Albums of 2017"	1	
2017	PopMatters	United States	"The Best Metal of 2017"	12	
2017	Revolver	United States	"20 Best Albums of 2017"	2	
2017	Rolling Stone	United States	"20 Best Metal Albums of 2017"	11	
2017	Loudwire	United States	"Top 50 Thrash Metal Albums of All Time"	43	
2019	MetalSucks	United States	"The 25 Best Metal Albums Of 2010-2019"	6	
2019	Vice Media	United States	"The 100 Best Albums Of The 2010s"	4	

=== Awards and nominations ===
Year	Ceremony	Category	Result	Ref.
2021	Grammy Awards	"Executioner's Tax (Swing of the Axe) (Live)"	Best Metal Performance	Nominated
2017	Loudwire Music Awards	Nightmare Logic	Best Metal Album	Nominated
2017	Loudwire Music Awards	"Executioner's Tax (Swing of the Axe)"	Best Metal Song	Won

== Track listing ==
No.	Title	Length
1.	"Soul Sacrifice"	4:12
2.	"Executioner's Tax (Swing of the Axe)"	3:46
3.	"Firing Squad"	3:19
4.	"Nightmare Logic"	4:23
5.	"Waiting Around to Die"	4:24
6.	"Ruination"	3:11
7.	"If Not Us Then Who"	4:11
8.	"Crucifixation"	5:22
Total length:		32:51

== Personnel ==
Personnel adapted from CD liner notes.

Power Trip

- Riley Gale – vocals, lyrics
- Blake Ibanez – lead guitar
- Nick Stewart – rhythm guitar
- Chris Whetzel – bass
- Chris Ulsh – drums, lead guitar on "If Not Us Then Who"

Additional personnel

- Arthur Rizk – production, engineering, mixing, additional lead guitar on "Crucifixation"
- Dominick Fernow (as Prurient) – introduction on "Waiting Around to Die"
- Matthew Barnhart – engineering
- Daniel Schmuck – vocal engineering
- Joel Grind – mastering
- Paolo Girardi – artwork

== Charts ==
Chart	Peak position
US Top Hard Rock Albums (Billboard)	22
US Heatseekers Albums (Billboard)	4
