= Opening Fire: 2008–2014 =

Compilation album by Power Trip
- Released: April 27, 2018
- Length: 35:56
- Label: Dark Operative
- Producer: Arthur Rizk

Power Trip chronology
Nightmare Logic (2017)	Opening Fire: 2008–2014 (2018)

Opening Fire: 2008–2014 is the first compilation album by American thrash metal band Power Trip. The album gathers songs that have never appeared on an album. The album documents their self-titled 7” single, "This World" (from The Extermination Vol: 2 LP compilation by Flatspot Records), "Hammer of Doubt" (2010 version from America's Hardcore LP compilation by Triple B Records), and the entirety of The Armageddon Blues Sessions.

== Background ==
All tracks have been remastered by the band's longtime producer Arthur Rizk with the release being rounded out by artwork from Portland illustrator Matt Stikker. Power Trip's vocalist, Riley Gale commented in an interview with Revolver:

“So this digital package comes on Friday and the vinyl will come out eventually. We've got a single in the tank for Adult Swim that we're just kind of finishing up. We got an Outburst cover that's going to appear on their collection, but we're really going to just take it easy after that tour. We basically have been gone for about 12 of the past 16 months. So that's kind of the end of the cycle. We have a few odds and ends here and there in the U.K., South America and Australia.”

== Reception ==
Sam Houlden of Punknews.org gave the album 4/5 stars in his review.

== Track listing ==
All tracks written by the band:

No.	Title	Length
1.	"Divine Apprehension"	4:17
2.	"Suffer No Fool"	2:33
3.	"Brainwave (Prong cover)"	3:09
4.	"This World (2014 version)"	2:59
5.	"Hammer of Doubt (2010 version)"	4:28
6.	"Armageddon Blues"	4:33
7.	"Lake of Fire"	2:54
8.	"The Evil Beat"	3:25
9.	"Acid"	2:39
10.	"Questions"	1:08
11.	"Vultures"	3:31
Total length:		35:36
