= Richard Ramirez (musician) =

American noise musician

- Origin: Houston, Texas, U.S.
- Genres: Harsh noise wall, power electronics, drone
- Occupation: Musician
- Years active: 1989–present
- Labels: Deadline Recordings, Next Halloween

Richard Ramirez is an American noise music artist originally from Houston, Texas, recording and performing both as a solo artist and as part of several groups, including Black Leather Jesus, Priest in Shit, An Innocent Young Throat-Cutter, House of the Black Death, Martyr of Sores, Last Rape and the "static noise" solo project Werewolf Jerusalem. He is notable for being one of the earliest American harsh noise artists.

== Life ==
He collaborated with Giovanni Mori, musician power noise, mind of the project L.C.B., his album Born (Old Europa Cafe in 2015) and has also made with L.C.B. an album on cassette entitled "Homo Sense" (Black Leather Jesus - Le Cose Bianche, Signora Ward Records).

Ramirez, as a part of the Black Leather Jesus, collaborates with his husband Sean E. Matzus. The project was founded by Richard Ramirez in 1989, who fronts the band alongside partner Sean E. Matzus and various other musicians assisting. At one point, the band had 14 members. The group's themes focus on S&M and the gay leather subculture. It was inspired by the kidnapping of Colleen Stan. Black Leather Jesus opened for Sonic Youth in Marfa, Texas in 2007. Black Leather Jesus has done releases with Merzbow, Incapacitants, Blue Sabbath Black Cheer, The Haters and M.S.B.R. among several others. The band is presently based near Pittsburgh, Pennsylvania.

== Style ==
Ramirez draws a distinction between his relatively few professionally printed CDs and LPs and the many CD-Rs and tapes he produces for smaller record labels. He has done collaborations and split releases with many important figures in the noise field, including Merzbow, Emil Beaulieau, Kommissar Hjuler and Mama Baer, Skin Crime, The Haters, Prurient, Smell & Quim, Macronympha, Stabat Mors, Kenji Siratori, Sudden Infant, and MSBR.

Ramirez's work tends to consist of long, slowly changing or static tracks of heavily distorted low- to mid-range noise, with a gradual move over the last several years toward more drone-influenced sounds in addition to his harsh noise work. Parallel to this evolution has been a shift in thematic concerns, with album covers, titles, and general themes changing from more typical noise music concerns such as violence and war (largely borrowed from industrial culture) to a focus on homosexual themes and gay pornography artwork. In addition to his musical work, Ramirez also runs the noise and experimental music label Deadline Recordings. Ramirez is also an "avant-garde" fashion designer under the alias, Richard Saenz.
