= Post Scriptvm =

Russian-American industrial band

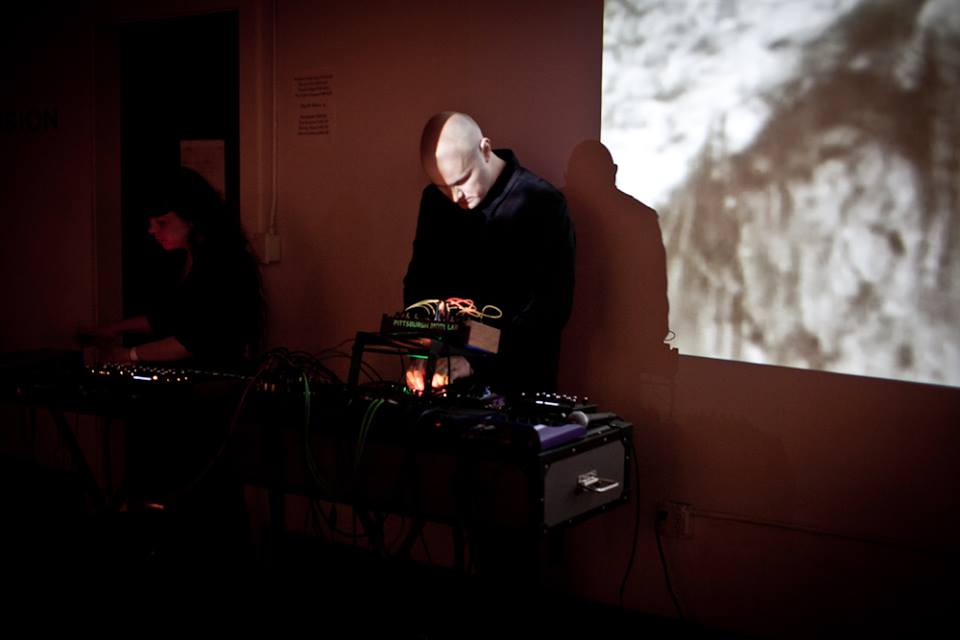

Background information
- Origin: Brooklyn, New York, United States
- Genres: Dark ambient Industrial; Experimental
- Years active: 1998–present
- Labels: Tesco Organisation; Epicurean; Hermetique; Somnambulant Corpse; NEN Records; Stridulum Recordings; Gazoline; Cloister Recordings; DumpsterScore; Death in Venice Productions
- Website: postscriptvm.com

Post Scriptvm is a Russian-American industrial band based in New York City. They have been active since 1998. The full names and personal details of the members are not publicized.

The musical style of Post Scriptvm is rooted in the dark ambient, old school industrial, and experimental genres ranging from eerie, hypnotic soundscapes to focused industrial noise assaults, often within a single track. The project does not use computer-based software synthesizers or drum machines, preferring analog synthesizers, samplers, scrap metal percussion, field recordings, traditional acoustic instruments, as well as various analog and digital hardware effects.

Post Scriptvm albums explore subjects including mental illness, altered states of mind, social disintegration, western esotericism, and apocalyptic religious cults. The project draws inspiration from the art and literary movements of the early 20th century, particularly Russian Futurism. Many compositions and lyrics are based on the poetry of Russian Futurists like Vladimir Mayakovsky, Aleksei Kruchenykh, and Bozhidar. The 2016 EP Тучи Над Борском (Russian for "Thunderclouds over Borsk"), was released as a limited edition cassette tape. It aims to recreate the atmosphere of the rituals of Russia's underground religious sects.

In the mid-2000s, the project's early works attracted the attention of Tesco Organisation, who proceeded to issue the band's three best-known albums—Распадъ (2006), Grey Eminence (2010) and Benommenheit (2014). In 2015 Tesco reissued Post Scriptvm's first full-length album Gauze, a long out-of-print CD-R release, as a vinyl LP—a part of the Tesco Archaic Documents series.

Post Scriptvm's infrequent live performances have earned critical acclaim. The group has performed at prominent industrial and experimental electronic music festivals on the East and West coasts of the US and in Europe; including the 2005 and 2007 editions of the Apex Fest in New York, the 2007 edition of the Wroclaw Industrial Festival in Poland, and the 2013 Epicurean Escapism Festival] in Berlin. In 2015, German record label The Epicurean released a live retrospective album, recorded at various locations during the period of 2003 to 2014, as a deluxe limited edition LP titled Séance.

== Discography ==
Title	Form	Year	Label	Extra information
Post Scriptvm	CD-R	1999	Post Scriptvm Self-released	
Lethargic Revelation	CD-R	2000	Post Scriptvm Self-released	
Gauze	CD-R	2002	Somnambulant Corpse	Reissued in 2015 on LP as part of Tesco Archaic Documents
Chiaroscvro	CD-R	2003	Stridulum Recordings	Reissued in 2022 on cassette by Cloister Recordings
Sea-Green Series - Chapter V	3"CD-R	2004	Gazoline	
Marginal Existence	CD	2005	Hermetique	Reissued in 2022 on cassette by Cloister Recordings
Распадъ	CD	2006	Tesco Organisation	
Grey Eminence	CD	2010	Tesco Organisation	
Benommenheit	CD	2014	Tesco Organisation	
Séance	LP	2015	The Epicurean	Live album
Тучи Над Борском	Cass	2016	NEN Records	
Litaniæ Mortuorum Discordantes	CD/LP	2016	The Epicurean/La Esencia	Split with Anemone Tube
Variola Vera	LP	2019	Tesco Organisation	
Eisstoß	LP	2024	Tesco Organisation	
CEKTA	Cass	2024	DumpsterScore	
Тучи над Борском: Эксгумация теней	CD	2025	Death in Venice Productions	Reissue of cassette EP from 2016, expanded with new tracks to a full-length album and new artwork
