= Bermuda Drain =

Studio album by Prurient
- Released: July 11, 2011
- Recorded: July 4 – December 31, 2010
- Genre: Electro-industrial; darkwave
- Length: 35:20
- Label: Hydra Head (HH666-220)
- Producer: Dominick Fernow; Kris Lapke

Prurient chronology
Annihilationist (2011)	Bermuda Drain (2011)	Time's Arrow (2011)

Singles from Bermuda Drain
- 1. "Many Jewels Surround the Crown" Released: April 16, 2011

Professional ratings
Aggregate scores
Source	Rating
Metacritic	79/100
Review scores
Source	Rating
The A.V. Club	A
Cokemachineglow	79%
Consequence of Sound	C−
Pitchfork	7.0/10
Sputnikmusic	4/5 stars
Tiny Mix Tapes	3/5 stars

Bermuda Drain is a studio album by the American artist Prurient, the stage name of Dominick Fernow. The album was released on July 11, 2011 through Hydra Head Records, and was the first release from Prurient through the label. Prurient released a single for the opening track "Many Jewels Surround the Crown" for Record Store Day in 2011.

== Background ==
About Bermuda Drain's musical style, distinctive feeling and setting, Fernow said:

"Upon a recent tour of Europe, I was constantly listening to minimal techno on headphones, driving at night through tunnels, and exhausted all of the records I had brought with me. The album is meant to satisfy that feeling. I've always felt connected to landscapes, moving through them, and their linear nature. Time passing. Watching as the world rolls over you while being divorced from it. The visual essence of feedback is a thin line, just like the structure of the landscape."

== Concept ==
From lyrics, Bermuda Drain features an ambiguous plot; it chronicles the protagonist torturing and killing someone baited into meeting them, yet still featuring descriptive and near psychedelic imagery and scenery. As with all of Dominick's albums that feature lyrics, his mother and writer Jean Feraca assisted with lyrical content and narratives.

== Critical reception ==
Bermuda Drain was met with "generally favorable" reviews from critics. At Metacritic, which assigns a weighted average rating out of 100 to reviews from mainstream publications, this release received an average score of 79 based on 9 reviews.

In a review for Consequence of Sound, critic reviewer Adam Kivel wrote: "The album works out to much that same tune, a sort of head-scratching confusion. It can be difficult to separate this album both in its difference from Fernow's past output and from the connections that it holds to his work with Cold Cave. Despite the ability to place this on a continuum, this is a record that sounds so dissimilar from its kin, a unique new version of an old favorite." At Pitchfork, Jess Harvell explained: "Bermuda Ground isn't just pleasant by contrast with Prurient's old unholy racket. It's often actively enjoyable, albeit in a decidedly creepy way, rooted as much in familiar retro-rock moves as formless face-eating noise. Perhaps it's down to Fernow's time playing in the decidedly more accessible and anthemic synth-pop/post-punk act Cold Cave, but Bermuda Drain is full of distortion-free keyboard, perverse disco beats, moments of beauty, even hooks." Jason Heller from The A.V. Club gave high praise for the release, noting that it's Prurient's "strongest statement to date, and its best album."

== Track listing ==
Bermuda Drain track listing
No.	Title	Length
1.	"Many Jewels Surround the Crown"	2:44
2.	"A Meal Can Be Made"	2:17
3.	"Bermuda Drain"	3:07
4.	"Watch Silently"	3:23
5.	"Palm Tree Corpse"	5:19
6.	"There Are Still Secrets"	3:53
7.	"Let's Make a Slave"	4:32
8.	"Myth of Sex"	4:26
9.	"Sugar Cane Chapel"	5:39

== Personnel ==
Bermuda Drain personnel adapted from AllMusic.

Music and lyrics

- Jean Feraca – lyric assistant
- Dominick Fernow
- Kris Lapke – percussion, synthesizer

Production

- Dominick Fernow – production
- Kris Lapke – engineering, mastering, mixing, production

Artwork and packaging

- Dominick Fernow – art direction
- Ari Marcopoulos – photography
- Nikolai Saveliev – design
