= Power Trip (band) =

American thrash metal band

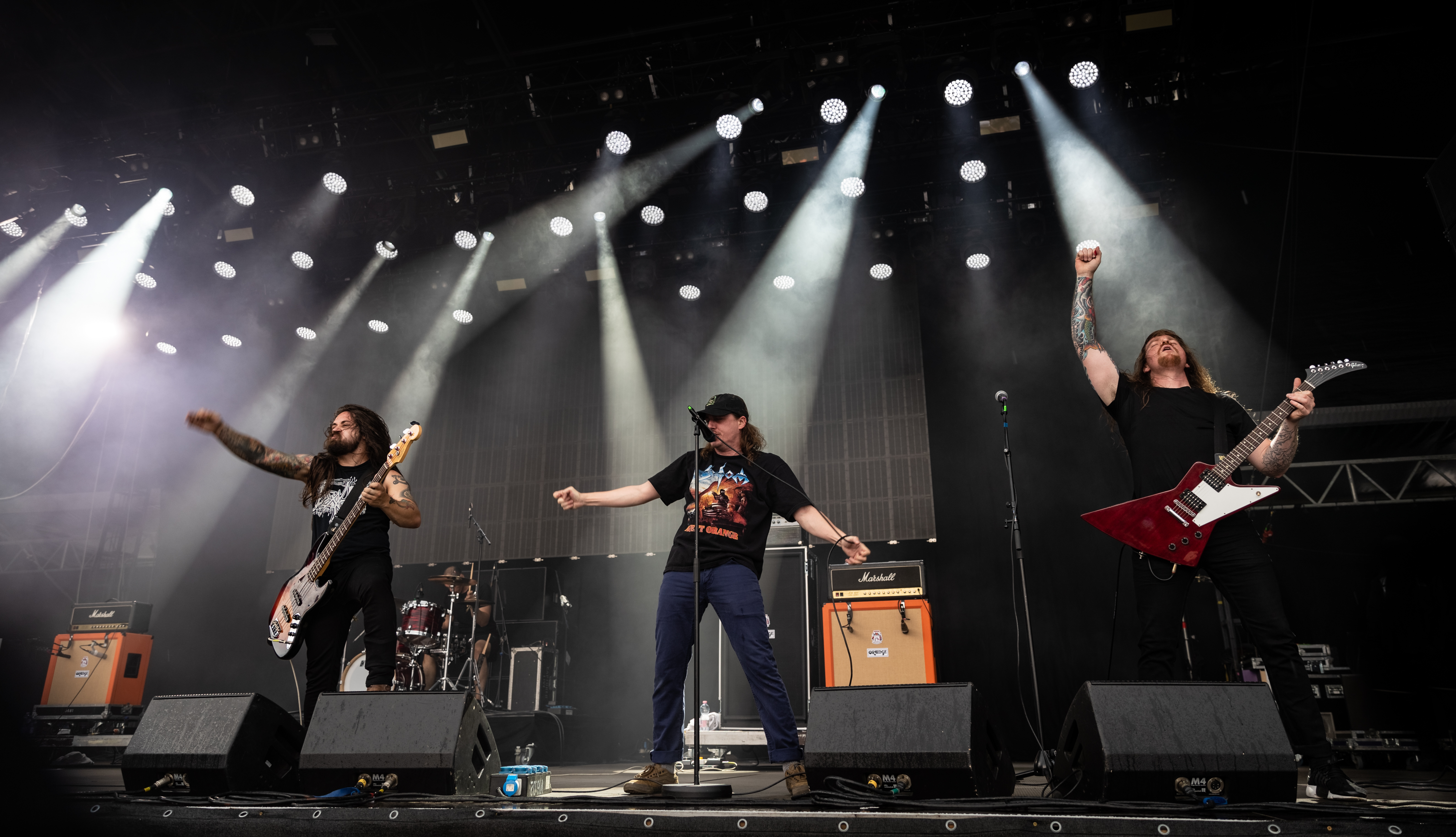
- Power Trip in 2019

Background information
- Origin: Dallas, Texas, U.S.
- Genres: Thrash metal; crossover thrash; hardcore punk
- Years active: 2008–2020; 2023–present
- Labels: Southern Lord; Dark Operative; Blue Grape Music
- Members: Blake Ibanez; Chris Ulsh; Nick Stewart; Chris Whetzel; Seth Gilmore
- Past members: Riley Gale; Marcus Johnson; Mark Rubin
- Website: powertripsl.bandcamp.com

Power Trip is an American crossover thrash band formed in Dallas, Texas, in 2008. By 2020, Power Trip's lineup consisted of Riley Gale (lead vocals), Blake Ibanez (lead guitar), Nick Stewart (rhythm guitar), Chris Whetzel (bass) and Chris Ulsh (drums); the latter replaced drummer Marcus Johnson, who left in 2009. Drummer Mark Rubin played and recorded with the group at its formation in 2008 before departing within several months. Their current singer is Seth Gilmore, who replaced Gale in 2023, more than three years after the latter's death. They have released two studio albums to date, Manifest Decimation (2013) and Nightmare Logic (2017), plus a compilation including their early tracks and a live album.

Power Trip was one of the most successful thrash metal bands of the 2010s, with Nightmare Logic entering the Billboard charts, and receiving a number of accolades by publications. A live version of the song "Executioner's Tax (Swing of the Axe)" received a nomination for the Grammy Award for Best Metal Performance.

== History ==
In 2013, the band signed with the Southern Lord Records label and released their first studio album, Manifest Decimation. Their second album, Nightmare Logic, was released in 2017 to critical acclaim. The Guardian mentioned that singer Riley Gale's lyrics on Nightmare Logic, were about "social inequality and activism". He described Nightmare Logic as "dealing with this waking nightmare, things seem so surreal that they're unbelievable … trying to find optimism and a motivating force and realising that the 99% of us have more in common than we think". The success of Nightmare Logic, as well as sharing the stage with the likes of Ozzy Osbourne, Anthrax, Exodus, Testament, D.R.I., Suicidal Tendencies, Napalm Death, Lamb of God, Hatebreed, Five Finger Death Punch, Opeth, Danzig and Obituary, helped Power Trip become one of the most popular thrash metal bands in the 2010s.

In 2018, the album Opening Fire: 2008–2014 was released as a way to compile their extra tracks. In late 2019, Power Trip announced that they were working on their third album.

Vocalist Riley Gale died on August 25, 2020, at the age of 34. His death was announced by the band the next day. In May 2021, it was reported that the official cause of death was ruled by the Dallas County's medical examiner as an accidental overdose from the "toxic effects" of fentanyl. The report also claimed that Gale, who reportedly had a history of depression and drug abuse, had been found "unresponsive on the floor at home" and the only other substance found in his system was marijuana.

At the time of Gale's death, Power Trip was on the bill for a European tour with Lamb of God and Kreator, which was originally scheduled to take place in the spring of 2020 before the COVID-19 pandemic resulted in the tour being rescheduled to late 2021 and again to late 2022; the band was eventually replaced by Thy Art is Murder and Gatecreeper.

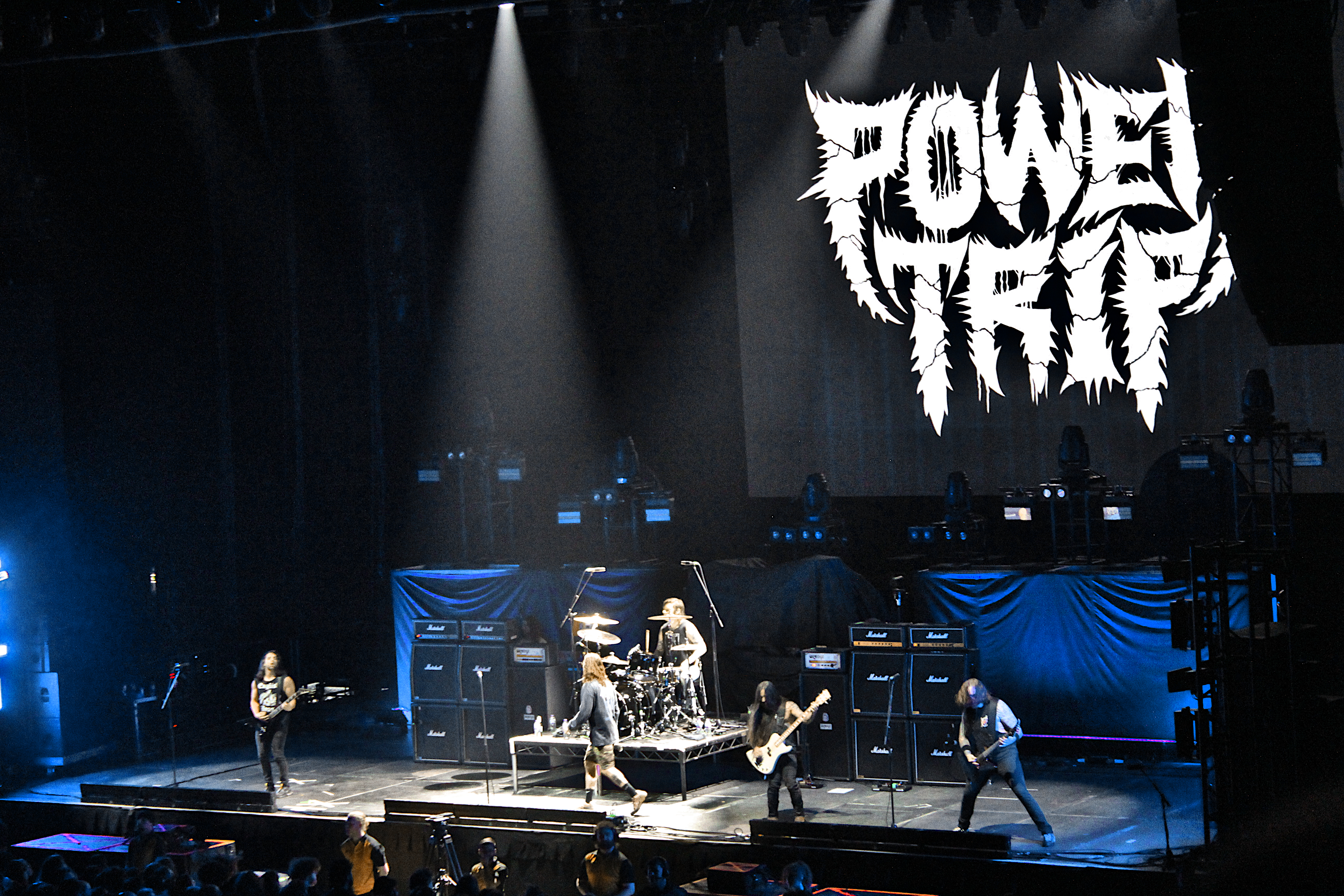
Power Trip performing live in 2025

In a March 2021 interview with Los Angeles Times, the surviving members of Power Trip stated that they were unsure of the band's future, but did not rule out the possibility of continuing in Gale's memory. Lead guitarist Blake Ibanez commented, "We do want to continue to play music together; we just are not sure what that looks like at this time."

On December 1, 2023, the surviving members of Power Trip played a secret surprise set at The Mohawk in Austin, Texas with Fugitive's Seth Gilmore on vocals. On February 20, 2024, the band announced they would be playing several shows in 2024, starting with the No Values Festival in June, with Gilmore returning on vocals. They also embarked on their first tour in over five years as a direct support for Pantera's early 2025 European tour. The tour received a negative response from some fans of the band, as Gale had previously stated in 2017 his views against Pantera vocalist Phil Anselmo following Anselmo's 2016 allegations of Nazism and racism. This led to Power Trip's refusal to tour with Anselmo's band Superjoint at the time.

In November 2025, Ibanez announced that there would be a new Power Trip album in 2026. In March 2026, it was announced that the band was signed to Blue Grape Music and planned to release their new album later in the year or in 2027. On April 1, 2026, Power Trip were announced on the line-up for Dark Mofo in Tasmania, Australia. They performed their first Australian show in eight years at the Odeon Theatre in Hobart on June 18, exclusively for the festival. On October 9, 2026, Power Trip released their first songs in nearly a decade, and first with Gilmore on vocals, "Precinct 3" and "Scavenger". They are expected to appear on the band's as-yet-untitled upcoming third album, which is due for release in the spring of 2027.

== Musical style and influences ==
Their sound has been described by critics as thrash metal and hardcore punk, as well as simply crossover thrash. Gale cited the importance of guitar riffs and pop songs: "Some of Blake [Ibanez]'s favorite bands are Killing Joke, Stone Roses, Siouxsie and the Banshees, the Wipers". Gale said that he worked hard to do concise lyrics: "each word relates to the sentence, and how the sentence relates to the verse. Making sure everything's connected and there's not a syllable wasted." "I try to write something that's catchy that people can sing along to mindlessly". "[I write about] the frustrations with what I see. People's motivations". AllMusic wrote that their music reached fans of both "hardcore punk and extreme music". Other influences they have cited include Anti-Cimex, Bad Brains, Breakdown, the Cro-Mags, Discharge, D.R.I., English Dogs, Entombed, Excel, Exodus, the Icemen, Killing Time, Leeway, Nuclear Assault, Prong, Sacrilege, Sepultura, Sodom, Suicidal Tendencies and Vio-lence.

== Band members ==
Current members

- Blake Ibanez – lead guitar, backing vocals (2008–present)
- Nick Stewart – rhythm guitar, backing vocals (2008–present)
- Chris Whetzel – bass (2008–present)
- Chris Ulsh – drums, backing vocals (2009–present)
- Seth Gilmore – lead vocals (2023–present)

Former members

- Riley Gale – lead vocals (2008–2020; his death)
- Marcus Johnson – drums (2008–2009)
- Mark Rubin – drums (2008)

== Discography ==
=== Studio albums ===
Year	Album details
2013	Manifest Decimation: Released: June 11, 2013; Label: Southern Lord Records
2017	Nightmare Logic: Released: February 24, 2017; Label: Southern Lord Records

=== Compilation albums ===
Year	Album details
2018	Opening Fire: 2008–2014: Released: April 27, 2018; Label: Dark Operative

=== Live albums ===
Year	Album details
2020	Live in Seattle: 05.28.2018: Released: June 11, 2020; Re-Released: June 23, 2023; Label: Dark Operative

=== Singles ===
Year	Name	Album
2016	Split	Single release
2016	"Firing Squad"	Nightmare Logic
2017	"Executioner's Tax (Swing of the Axe)"	Nightmare Logic
2017	"Nightmare Logic"	Nightmare Logic
2018	"Hornet's Nest"	Adult Swim Singles Collection
2019	"When Things Go Wrong"	Hot Sh!t Attitude

=== EPs ===
Year	EP details
2008	Demo 2008: Released: 2008
2009	Armageddon Blues: Released: 2009
2011	Power Trip: Released: 2011

== Awards and nominations ==
Loudwire Music Awards

Year	Nominee / work	Award	Result
2017	Nightmare Logic	Metal Album of the Year	Nominated
2017	Power Trip	Metal Band of the Year	Nominated
2017	"Executioner's Tax (Swing of the Axe)"	Metal Song of the Year	Won

Loudwire

Year	Nominee / work	Award	Result
2017	Nightmare Logic	Best Metal Album of the Year	Won

Metal Storm Awards

Year	Nominee / work	Award	Result
2013	Manifest Decimation	The Best Thrash Metal Album	Nominated
2017	Nightmare Logic	The Best Thrash Metal Album	Nominated

Grammy Awards

Year	Nominee / work	Award	Result
2021	"Executioner's Tax (Swing of the Axe)" (live)	Best Metal Performance	Nominated
