= Time's Arrow (EP) =

EP by Prurient
- Released: October 25, 2011
- Genre: Industrial, noise
- Length: 23:20
- Label: Hydra Head (HH666–231)

Prurient chronology
Bermuda Drain (2011)	Time's Arrow (2011)	Stun Gun (2011)

Professional ratings
Review scores
Source	Rating
Pitchfork	7.0/10.0
PopMatters	7/10 stars

Time's Arrow is an EP by the American musical project Prurient, the performing name of the artist Dominick Fernow. It was released on October 25, 2011, through Hydra Head Records, and was described as "taking a bold step away from the sounds which drew attention his way in the formative years."

The EP's title track "Time's Arrow" references both the novel Time's Arrow and the Black Dahlia murder.

== Track listing ==
1. "Time's Arrow" – 7:38
2. "Time's Arrow (Unsolved)" – 4:05
3. "Let's Make a Slave (De-Shelled)" – 1:55
4. "Maskless Face" – 3:07
5. "Slavery In the Bahamas" (instrumental) – 6:35
