= Macronympha =

American noise group

- Origin: (United States) Allegheny County, Pennsylvania, Pittsburgh, Pennsylvania
- Genres: Noise music; Harsh noise wall; Power electronics
- Years active: 1990-present
- Label: Mother Savage Noise Productions
- Members: Joseph Roemer; Rodger Stella
- Past members: Leonardo Sabatto; Liz Fox; Tim Oliveira

Macronympha is an American noise music and power electronics group formed in 1990 by Joseph Roemer and Rodger Stella in Pittsburgh, Pennsylvania. Tim Oliveira (Stimbox) and Dominick Fernow (Prurient) have occasionally appeared on Macronympha recordings and live performances.

A great number of their releases are in cassette format, released on various underground labels worldwide including their own Mother Savage Noise Productions. So far they have exclusively played live shows in the US.

== History ==
Macronympha's trademark sound is the collage of metal junk bashed against each other, layered and looped, utilizing mostly analogue equipment. Macronympha has collaborated with many names from the noise scene, including K2, Government Alpha and The Grey Wolves.

The band appeared in the experimental festival No Fun Fest (mostly known as a landmark festival in experimental and noise scene) which took place in the Hook auditorium, Brooklyn on March 18 2006,

== Partial discography ==
- Insane Torture Device (1991, cassette)
- Physical Chaos (1992, cassette)
- Noise Terrorism (1993, cassette)
- Insemination Bath / Radio For The People (1994, cassette)
- Naked Denunciation of Infrasonic Exchange (1994, cassette)
- Relentless Agony (1994, cassette)
- Ultimate Vibrator (1994, cassette)
- Grind (1995, cassette)
- Notes From Underground (1995, cassette)
- The Spectacle Of Ravishing Our Maidens (1995, cassette)
- White Music (1995, cassette)
- Ongoing Orgasm (1995, cassette)
- Whorechestra (1995, cassette)
- Pittsburgh, Pennsylvania (1995, LP)
- Baroque (1996, cassette)
- Collapsing Infrastructure Part 2 (1996, cassette)
- Amplified Humans (1997, cassette)
- Live Constructions NYC (1997, cassette)
- Metal Noise (1997, cassette)
- White Album (1997, cassette)
- New Noise Loops / Motors And Fine Art (1998, cassette)
- Intensive Care (1998, CD)
- Membranes And Black Holes (2002, CD)
- Measuring, Monitoring, Calibrating (2006, cassette)
- Macrocanibalismo (2016, CDr)
- Discovering The Unknown (2016, CDr)
- Himalayan Pink, Macronympha / Le Cose Bianche (2017, cassette)
- hiroyuki chiba/Macronympha Split (2020, cassette)
- Macronympha/New Grasping Machina Split (2022, cassette)
