= Genocide Organ =

Power electronics group

- Origin: Mannheim, Germany
- Genres: Power electronics; death industrial; martial industrial
- Years active: 1985–present
- Label: Tesco Organisation
- Members: Brigant Moloch; Wilhelm Herich
- Past members: Ronald Freisler; D.A.X. Doc M. Riot

Genocide Organ is a German power electronics/martial industrial collective, formed in Mannheim, Germany in 1985 by the founders of Tesco Organisation music label. They are known for their brutal and controversial presentation in their music and attitude.

Many of the themes present in their music make reference to the Ku Klux Klan, the Third Reich and war. This insistence on these themes has led to accusations of being far-right extremists, they have denied these accusations in interviews saying: “We never say what we think, and we never believe what we say, and if we tell the truth by accident, we hide it under so many lies that it is difficult to find out”. Due to this attitude, the website Discogs has blocked the sale of a number of their albums.

== Discography ==
- Leichenlinie (1989)
- Save Our Slaves (1991)
- Mind Control (1995)
- Remember (1997)
- The Truth Will Make You Free (1999)
- Same (2003)
- In-Konflikt (2004)
- Under-Kontrakt (2011)
- Obituary of the Americas (2016)
- Civilization (2017)
- Movement (2019)
- Carte Blanche [Collaboration album with Prurient] (2023)
- Death Zones (2023)
- All Is Suffering (2024)
- Operations With Contempt (2025)
- Maggots On The Cliffside [Collaboration album with Prurient] (2025)
