= Sissy Spacek (band) =

American noise band

- Origin: California, U.S.
- Genres: Noise, harsh noise, noisecore, grindcore
- Years active: 1999–present
- Labels: Helicopter, Misanthropic Agenda, Tape Room, Troniks
- Members: John Wiese; Charlie Mumma

Sissy Spacek is an American noise band founded in 1999 in Los Angeles and currently consisting of official members John Wiese and Charlie Mumma, along with several collaborators both past and present. Since the release of their self-titled debut album in 2001, they have released a considerable catalogue encompassing genres which include harsh noise, noisecore, grindcore, free improvisation and musique concrete. Early releases consisted of collages of previously recorded demos and live performances with heavy use of cut-up editing. Many works have been released or re-released on Wiese's own label, Helicopter.

Past members or collaborators include Corydon Ronnau, Jesse Jackson, Danny McClain, Sara Taylor (Youth Code), Aaron Hemphill (Liars), Kevin Drumm, as well as Merzbow, Smegma, Hijokaidan and The Haters.

The band was ranked fourth in LA Weekly's 2015 article "The 20 Best Punk Bands in L.A. Right Now".

In 2018, the band toured the US and Japan.

== Discography ==
=== Albums ===
- Sissy Spacek (Helicopter/PACrec/A Dear Girl Called Wendy, 2001) - Italy
- Scissors (Helicopter/Misanthropic Agenda, 2002)
- Remote Whale Control (Helicopter/Misanthropic Agenda, 2003)
- Devils Cone And Palm (Helicopter/Misanthropic Agenda, 2006)
- French Record (Tape Room/Dual Plover, 2008) - Australia
- California Ax (Helicopter, 2008)
- Glass (Misanthropic Agenda, 2009)
- Gore Jet (Sweat Lung, 2009) - Australia
- 15-Tet Oakland (Misanthropic Agenda, 2010)
- Sepsis (Second Layer, 2010) - UK
- Dash/Anti-Clockwise (EET/Gilgongo/Helicopter, 2011)
- Rip (Gilgongo/Helicopter, 2011)
- Freaked With Jet (Gilgongo, 2011)
- Grisp (Gilgongo, 2011)
- Harm (Troniks, 2012)
- Wastrel Projection (Antropofago Ateo/Handmade Birds, 2012)
- Wreck (Phage Tapes, 2013)
- Harm 2 (Troniks, 2013)
- Billions And Billions (Chondritic Sound/Claimed Responsibility, 2013)
- Sissy Spacek/K2, (Helicopter, 2014)
- First Four (Helicopter, 2015)
- Brath, (Oxen, 2015)
- Basement-Spear (Claimed Responsibility, 2015)
- Duration Groups (Helicopter, 2016)
- Reversed Normalization, (Helicopter, 2016)
- Disfathom, (Helicopter, 2016)
- Slow Move (Troniks, 2017)
- L/L (Helicopter, 2018)
- Pitched Intervention (Helicopter/Bank Burner, 2018)
- Trash Staging, (New Forces, 2018)
- Blear (Tape Room/Gilgongo, 2018)
- Ways Of Confusion (Nuclear War Now! Productions, 2018)
- Formation (Daymare Recordings, 2018) - Japan
- Spirant (Daymare Recordings, 2018) - Japan
- Expanding Antiverse (Dotsmark, 2018) - Japan
- Multifactorial Dynamic Pathways (with The Haters, Helicopter, 2019)
- Entropic (with Hijokaidan, Helicopter, 2019)
- Ballast (with Smegma, Helicopter, 2019)
- Corpus (Helicopter, 2020)
- Prismatic Parameter (Helicopter, 2020)
- Featureless Thermal Equilibrium (Helicopter, 2020)
- Electric Field in Parallel (Helicopter, 2022)
- BMW (Helicopter, 2022)
- Radio Format (Helicopter, 2022)
- Tempo Scalato (Helicopter, 2022)
- Reslayer (Helicopter, 2022)
- Threshold (Helicopter, 2023)
- Mechanical Abstraction (Helicopter, 2023)
- Live in Hong Kong (Helicopter, 2023)
- Indefatigable Demoralization (Helicopter, 2023)
- Absorb Wanting Symbols (Petite Soles, 2023)
- Benigemony Asiniscrepancy (Helicopter, 2023)
- Cosm (Helicopter, 2024)
- Valleity (Helicopter, 2024)
- Coronado (with Merzbow, Helicopter, 2024)
- Antitheater (Cipher Productions, 2024)
- Hunter Killer (Helicopter, 2024)
- Mirror Aggressor State (Helicopter, 2024)
- Diaphanous (To Live A Lie, 2024)
- Bolero Shield (Helicopter, 2024)
- Materializing Defective Fascia (Helicopter, 2025)
- Zero-Sum (Chaotic Noise, 2025)
- Entrance (Shelter Press, 2025)
- Repeater (with AMK, Helicopter, 2025)
- The Man and The Old Sea (with Vortex Campaign, Helicopter/Troniks, 2025)
- Non-Linear (No Holiday, 2025)
- Geometric Reason (SSSM, 2026)
- Electric Garden (with Smegma, Helicopter, 2026)
- Declension (Helicopter, 2026)
- Panra-Prismatic in Finite Blind (with Gasp, Slap-a-Ham Records, 2026)
