= Zipper Spy =

American experimental music

Zipper Spy was a pseudonym used by the American multimedia artist Maria Moran, for projects that incorporated a variety of sound and visual sources, especially zippers.
