= Jean Feraca =

American poet, journalist, and radio host

- Born: New York state
- Education: Manhattanville College; University of Michigan
- Occupations: Poet, journalist, and radio host

Jean Feraca is an American poet, journalist, and radio host.

== Biography ==
She was born in New York state, majored in English at Manhattanville College, and received an M.S. degree from the University of Michigan. After college she lived in Rome and spent time traveling in Italy before moving to Madison, Wisconsin.

She is mother to New York City-based experimental musician Dominick Fernow, also known as Prurient.

== Career ==
Feraca worked in public radio for 27 years. She started her career with National Public Radio affiliate WGUC-FM, then worked as a freelance reporter for NPR's Morning Edition and All Things Considered. In 1983 she went to work for Wisconsin Public Radio (WPR) as humanities producer. She became WPR's Distinguished Senior Broadcaster and hosted "Conversations with Jean Feraca" from 1990 to 2003; the show received the Distinguished Media Award from the National Telemedia Council in 1996. Starting in 2003 she hosted Here on Earth: Radio Without Borders, a daily program. She retired from radio in 2012.

Feraca's first book of poems, South from Rome: Il Mezzogiorno (1976), won the Discovery Award from The Nation; it was assisted by a grant from the National Endowment for the Arts. She received a grant from the Wisconsin Arts Board for her second book, Crossing the Great Divide (1992). Her 2007 memoir, I Hear Voices: A Memoir of Love, Death, and the Radio, was named an "Outstanding Book" by the American Association of School Librarians and one of the year's "Best Books for General Audiences" by the Public Library Association. She was inducted into the Wisconsin Academy of Sciences Arts & Letters in 2012.

Her poetry and articles have appeared in journals such as Poetry, the American Poetry Review, the Iowa Review, the North American Review, Italian Americana, and other journals; and in anthologies such as Helen Barolini's The Dream Book: An Anthology of Writings by Italian American Women (1985).
