= Hospital Productions =

- Founded: 1998
- Founder: Dominick Fernow
- Genre: Experimental; electronic; noise; extreme metal
- Country of origin: United States
- Official website: Official website

Hospital Productions is an American record label founded in 1998 by Dominick Fernow, commonly known as Prurient.

== History ==
Hospital Productions was founded in 1998 when Fernow was 16 years old. Many cassettes and CDrs were released in its early years, many of Fernow's own creations under the name Prurient, as well as various local acts. In 2006, a Hospital Productions store was established in the basement of the record store Jammyland. After Jammyland left, Hospital Productions moved into its space and operated until December 1, 2011. Hospital Productions continues to operate as a label. In 2019, Hospital Productions joined Amazon Music to release Halloween-themed albums by Prurient, Vatican Shadow, and Steve Moore exclusively as Amazon Originals available on the streaming-platform's Prime Music.
