= John Wiese =

American musician

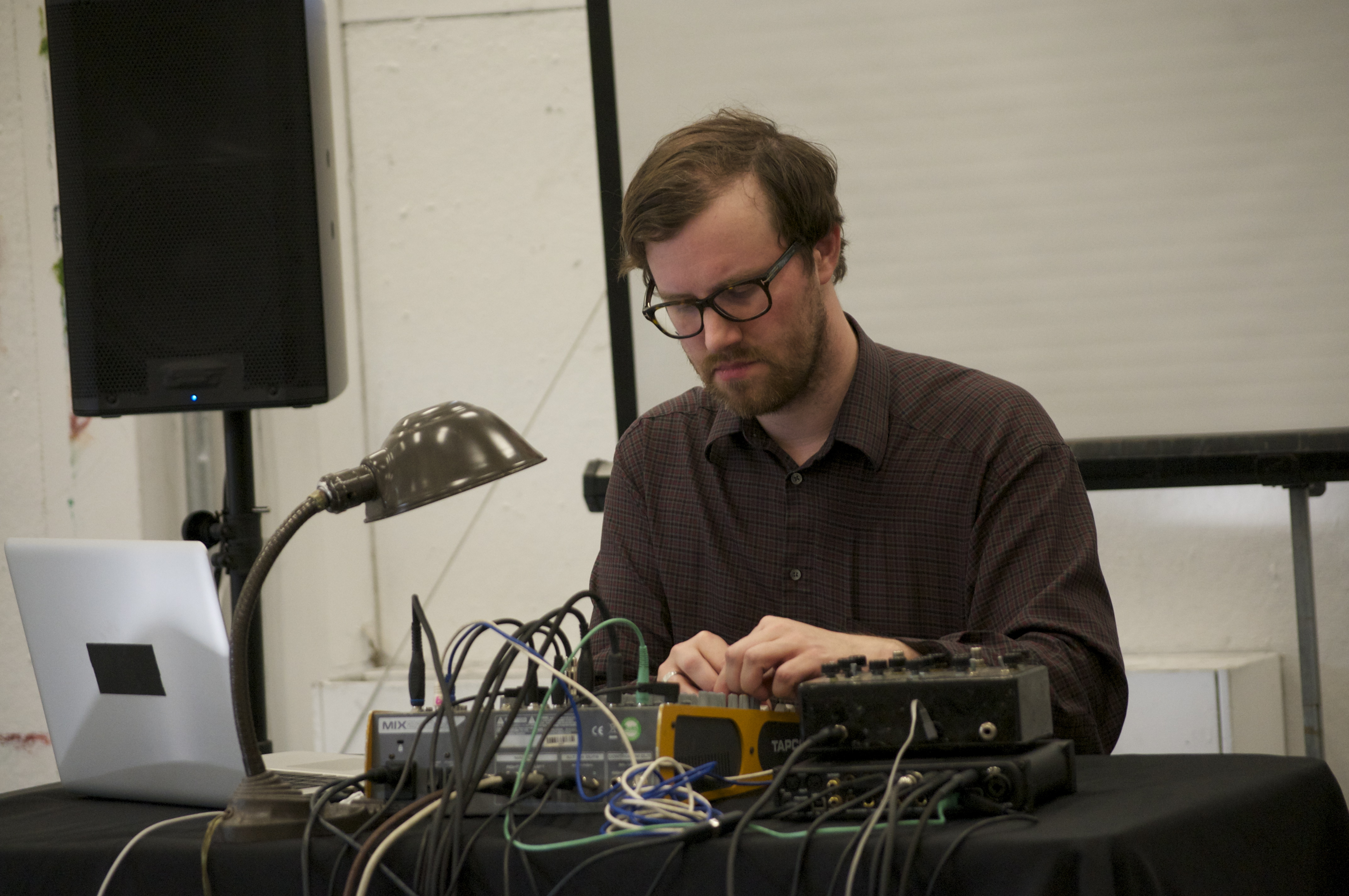
- John Wiese performing live in 2014
- Born: April 18, 1977 (age 49); Fort Leavenworth, Kansas, United States
- Education: California Institute of the Arts
- Occupations: Musician, visual artist
- Musical career
- Genres: Noise, grindcore
- Label: Helicopter
- Member of: Sissy Spacek

John Wiese (born April 18, 1977) is an American noise musician and visual artist based in Los Angeles, California. Wiese has released much of his material on his own Helicopter label.

He graduated from the California Institute of the Arts in 2001 with a BFA in Graphic Design.

Wiese is a member of the group Sissy Spacek.

== Partial discography ==
=== Solo albums ===
- Collected Tracks (2000)
- Light Of A Ghost (2005)
- Magical Crystal Blah Volume 2 (2005)
- Tumbler (2006)
- Black Magic Pond (2006)
- Soft Punk (2007)
- Inescapable Conclusion (2007)
- Dramatic Accessories (2008)
- Circle Snare (2009)
- Rotture (2007) / Gunfire (2009)
- GGA (2011)
- 100 Seven Inch Records by John Wiese (2011)
- Seven Of Wands (2011)
- Deviate From Balance (2015)
- Escaped Language (2017)
