= Mission of Burma discography =

- Studio albums: 5
- Extended plays: 3
- Live albums: 2
- Compilation albums: 8
- Singles: 5
- Video albums: 6

This is the discography for Mission of Burma, a post-punk band from Boston.

== Albums ==
=== Studio albums ===
- Vs. (Ace of Hearts, 1982)
- ONoffON (Matador, 2004)
- The Obliterati (Matador, 2006)
- The Sound the Speed the Light (Matador, 2009)
- Unsound (Fire, 2012)

=== EPs ===
- Signals, Calls, and Marches (Ace of Hearts, 1981)
- Peking Spring (Taang!, 1988)
- Four Hands EP (Matador, 2004)

=== Compilation albums ===
- Forget (Taang!, 1988)
- Mission of Burma (Rykodisc, 1988)
- Peking Spring (Taang!, 1989)
- Let There Be Burma (Emergo/Taang!, 1990)
- Accomplished: The Best of Mission of Burma (Rykodisc, 2004)
- A Gun to the Head: A Selection from the Ace of Hearts Era (Rykodisc, 2004)
- 12 Classic 45s V/A Compilation, Songs: "Academy Fight Song", "Max Ernst", "Trem Two", "OK/No Way" (Ace of Hearts, 2006)
- Learn How: The Essential Mission of Burma (Fire Records, 2012)

=== Live albums ===
- The Horrible Truth About Burma (Ace of Hearts, 1985)
- Snapshot (Matador, 2004)

== Singles ==
- "Academy Fight Song" b/w "Max Ernst" (Ace of Hearts, 1980)
- "Trem Two" b/w "OK/No Way" (Ace of Hearts, 1982)
- "Active in the Yard" b/w "Active in the Yard" by Spore (Taang! Records, 1994)
- "Dirt" b/w "Falling" (2004)
- "Innermost" b/w "...And Here It Comes" (Matador, 2009)
- "Dust Devil" (Fire, 2012)
- "Panic Is No Option" (Self-released, 2016)

== Video albums ==
- Live at the Bradford VHS (Atavistic/Ace of Hearts, 1989)
- Live at Tsongas Arena DVD [released in limited versions of The Obliterati (Matador, 2005)]
- Not a Photograph DVD (2006)
- Live at the Space 1979/Live at the Underground 1980 [released with Signals, Calls and Marches, the Definitive Collection I (Matador, 2008)]
- Live at The Bradford Ballroom, March 12, 1983 Afternoon Show [released with Vs., the Definitive Collection II (Matador, 2008)]
- Live at The Bradford Ballroom, March 12, 1983 Late Show [released with The Horrible Truth about Burma, the Definitive Collection III (Matador, 2008)]
