= Not a Photograph: The Mission of Burma Story =

- Directed by: Jeffrey Iwanicki; David A. Kleiler Jr.
- Produced by: Kristen Agrell; Eran Lobel; John Suvannavejh
- Starring: Clint Conley; Roger Miller; Peter Prescott; Bob Weston
- Release date: 2006
- Running time: 70 minutes
- Language: English

Not a Photograph: The Mission of Burma Story is a 2006 documentary about the band Mission of Burma and their 2002 "Inexplicable" tour, which saw the band reunite after a 19-year hiatus. The film premiered at the Independent Film Festival Boston on April 22, 2006.

The documentary features interviews with Sonic Youth’s Thurston Moore and Lee Ranaldo, Moby (who covered the song "That's When I Reach for My Revolver" for his album Animal Rights) Minutemen's Mike Watt, and Cheap Trick's Robin Zander. Rehearsal and concert footage of their 2002 tour are included in the film.

== Home release ==
Not a Photograph: The Mission of Burma Story was released on DVD by MVD Visual in November 2006.
