= Snapshot (Mission of Burma album) =

Live album by Mission of Burma
- Released: November 9, 2004
- Studios: Q Division Studios, Boston, MA, 2004
- Genre: Post-punk
- Length: 39:49
- Labels: Matador Records; OLE-641
- Producer: Mission of Burma

Mission of Burma chronology
A Gun to the Head: A Selection from the Ace of Hearts Era (2004)	Snapshot (2004)	The Obliterati (2006)

Professional ratings
Review scores
Source	Rating
Pitchfork	8.2/10

Snapshot is a live album by the American band Mission of Burma. It was recorded in front of a small audience at Boston's Q Division Studios for broadcast on WFNX. It was initially released exclusively through the iTunes Store, but has since been made available through other online channels, most notably in lossless FLAC format through Matador Records' online store.

== Track listing ==
1. "Tremolo" (Clint Conley) – 8:06
2. "Mica" (Holly Anderson and Conley) – 4:24
3. "Youth of America" (Greg Sage) – 6:41
4. "Absent Mind" (Peter Prescott) – 1:53
5. "Red" (Roger Miller) – 4:25
6. "That's How I Escaped My Certain Fate" (Conley) – 2:32
7. "Max Ernst" (Miller) – 3:10
8. "Dirt" (Conley) – 5:13

== Personnel ==
- Clint Conley – bass, vocals, percussion
- Roger Miller – guitar, vocals, percussion
- Peter Prescott – drums, vocals, percussion
- Bob Weston – loops, percussion

== Reception ==
David Raposa of Pitchfork said it was worthy of a "wider commercial release" and awarded it 8.2/10. Music critic Mark Prindle gave the album 8/10 and praised the mix of the album.
