= The Horrible Truth About Burma =

Live album by Mission of Burma
- Released: 1985
- Recorded: Boston, Chicago, New York, Detroit during 1983 final tour
- Genre: Post-punk
- Length: 39:15 (original/remaster), 54:16 (with bonus tracks), 52:30 (Ryko CD)
- Label: Original release, Ace of Hearts; 2008 reissue, Matador Records; OLE-732
- Producer: Mission of Burma

Mission of Burma chronology
Vs. (1982)	The Horrible Truth About Burma (1985)	ONoffON (2004)

Professional ratings
Review scores
Source	Rating
AllMusic	3.5/5 stars
The Austin Chronicle	3.5/5 stars
Robert Christgau	B
Entertainment Weekly	A−
Tom Hull	B−
Pitchfork	8.0/10
PopMatters	7/10 stars

The Horrible Truth About Burma is a collection of live recordings by Boston-based post-punk band Mission of Burma, recorded during their 1983 farewell tour. The band had decided to retire because leader Roger Miller's chronic tinnitus had reached a dangerous level.

Originally released in 1985 by Boston indie label Ace of Hearts, the album was first reissued in 1997 by Ryko, then in "Standard" and "Definitive" editions by Matador in 2008. The Definitive version of the CD and the vinyl release also include a DVD of the full evening set at the Bradford, as well as the VHS version of the show for posterity.

This live album is notable for capturing Mission of Burma's signature noisy live sound, in contrast to their more polished studio recordings. The album title is an inside joke about the "horrible truth" of their chaotic concerts.

== Reception ==
Spin said, "Mission of Burma was loud. The kind of loud that gives you a toothache. The Horrible Truth About Burma recalls the feeling of standing next to the stage during the first chord. It documents the unexpected end of a band whose only constant was change." Pitchfork wrote, "This album has been faulted for its sonic clutter, but its raw energy is fascinating."

== Track listing (Original 1985 release) ==
All songs written by Roger Miller except as indicated:

=== Side One ===
1. "Tremolo" (Clint Conley) – Detroit – 4:11
2. "Peking Spring" (Conley) – Boston (Bradford Hotel) – 3:44
3. "Dumbells" – Chicago – 2:17
4. "New Disco" – Chicago – 3:25
5. "Dirt" (Conley) – Chicago – 3:40
6. "Go Fun Burn Man" (Conley) – Boston (The Channel) – 1:56 (2:20 with the silence at the end of side 1)

=== Side Two ===
1. "1970" (The Stooges) – New York – 3:35
2. "Blackboard" (Peter Prescott) – New York – 3:08
3. "He Is, She Is" –– Boston (Bradford Hotel) 2:43 (4:03 with crowd chatter)
4. "Heart of Darkness" (Pere Ubu) – Chicago – 8:55

=== Bonus tracks on the 2008 remaster ===
The vinyl came with an extra 12" with two songs per side. The CD release just adds these to the end of the album.

1. "That's When I Reach for My Revolver" (Conley) – New York – 3:38
2. "Weatherbox" – Detroit – 3:21
3. "Trem Two" – New York – 4:21
4. "Learn How" (Prescott) – Detroit – 3:44

The 1997 Ryko CD release substituted "Weatherbox" for "Red". Otherwise it has the same tracks but in a different order. It also eliminates all of the crowd chatter and silence at the end of some tracks.

1. "That's When I Reach for My Revolver" (Conley) – New York – 3:38
2. "Tremolo" (Conley) – Detroit – 4:08
3. "Dumbells" – Chicago – 2:07
4. "Peking Spring" (Conley) – Boston (Bradford Hotel) – 3:41
5. "1970" (The Stooges) – New York – 3:35
6. "Learn How" (Prescott) – Detroit – 3:33
7. "New Disco" – Chicago – 3:26
8. "Dirt" (Conley) – Chicago – 3:29
9. "Red" – 3:48
10. "Heart of Darkness" (Pere Ubu) – Chicago – 8:54
11. "Trem Two" – New York – 4:31
12. "Blackboard" (Prescott) – New York – 3:08
13. "He Is, She Is" – Boston (Bradford Hotel) 2:43
14. "Go Fun Burn Man" (Conley) – Boston (The Channel) – 1:56

== Personnel ==
- Clint Conley – Bass, vocals, percussion
- Roger Miller – Guitar, vocals, piano, trumpet, percussion
- Peter Prescott – Drums, vocals, percussion
- Martin Swope – Tape manipulations, loops, percussion
