= Signals, Calls, and Marches =

EP by Mission of Burma
- Released: August 1981
- Recorded: January–March 1981
- Genre: Post-punk
- Length: 20:47
- Label: Ace of Hearts
- Producer: Richard W. Harte

Mission of Burma chronology
Signals, Calls, and Marches (1981)	Vs. (1982)

Signals, Calls, and Marches is an EP and the debut release by American post-punk band Mission of Burma. It was released in 1981 by record label Ace of Hearts.

== Content ==
The album's first track is "That's When I Reach for My Revolver," which features a singable, anthemic chorus that helped make it one of the band's most popular songs.

Though Mission of Burma's live performances were characterized by noise and chaos, Signals, Calls, and Marches has a notably "cleaner" sound in comparison to the band's live performances and subsequent recordings. Some decades after its release, Marc Masters of Pitchfork would call this different sound "somewhat misrepresentative" of the band, as "[Producer Richard] Harte's production cleaned up the band's brutally loud live sound." Guitarist Roger Miller noted that the sound probably helped the band become more accessible, recalling:

We played a show in Cleveland ('81 or '82) and we were on the street in front of the club. A girl came up to us and said how much she was looking forward to the show, and that she loved "That's When I Reach for My Revolver". We thought we were golden. However, once we started playing, people backed up against the wall and after the first song did not applaud or respond to us one bit, even after we started heckling them. Even when we played "Revolver". So, it is quite probably true that the "mild-mannered" recording we made on Signals reached more people than if we recorded it in a more furious or noisy fashion.

== Release ==
Signals, Calls, and Marches was released in August 1981 by record label Ace of Hearts.

Upon its release in 1981, the record was immediately popular in the Boston area, charting at number six on local radio station WBCN's charts. The EP sold out its initial printing of ten thousand copies before the end of the year.

For the CD reissue, Rykodisc remastered the six original songs and added the two tracks from the band's 1980 debut 7" single, "Academy Fight Song" and "Max Ernst". The EP was remastered by Matador Records in 2008 with video material and two previously unreleased songs from their first recording session.

== Reception ==
Professional ratings
Review scores
Source	Rating
AllMusic	4.5/5 stars
Christgau's Record Guide	B+
Entertainment Weekly	B+
The Line of Best Fit	10/10
Pitchfork	9.8/10
PopMatters	9/10
Q	4/5 stars
Record Collector	4/5 stars
The Rolling Stone Album Guide	4/5 stars
Spin Alternative Record Guide	9/10

Signals, Calls, and Marches has been well received by critics.

In his retrospective review, Mark Deming of AllMusic stated that "if Mission of Burma were not yet at the peak of their form, most bands blazing as many trails as this one did lost their footing a lot more often that Burma did on these six songs; Signals, Calls and Marches was as accomplished and impressive a debut as any American band would release in the 1980s." Marc Masters of Pitchfork called it "impeccable" and "probably the best Mission of Burma release ever."

== Legacy ==
Signals, Calls, and Marches is considered an immensely influential landmark in the field of indie rock and alternative rock. Mark Deming of AllMusic wrote, "One could argue that [Signals, Calls, and Marches] was the point where indie rock as a separate and distinct musical subgenre well and truly began. Mission of Burma's music had the brawn and the volume of hardcore punk, but with a lyrical intelligence and obvious musical sophistication that set them apart from the Southern California faster-and-louder brigade." Marc Masters of Pitchfork opined that the EP "reverberated loudly through alternative rock for three decades, influencing everyone from R.E.M. to Fugazi to Nirvana."

Pitchfork ranked it the 53rd greatest album of the 1980s.

== Track listing ==
Side A
No.	Title	Writer(s)	Length
1.	"That's When I Reach for My Revolver"	Clint Conley	3:53
2.	"Outlaw"	Roger Miller	2:33
3.	"Fame and Fortune"	Miller	3:35

Side B
No.	Title	Writer(s)	Length
4.	"This Is Not a Photograph"	Miller	1:53
5.	"Red"	Miller	3:37
6.	"All World Cowboy Romance"	Conley, Miller	5:13

1997 Rykodisc bonus tracks
No.	Title	Writer(s)	Length
7.	"Academy Fight Song"	Conley	3:09
8.	"Max Ernst"	Miller	3:04

2008 Matador Records track listing
No.	Title	Writer(s)	Length
1.	"Academy Fight Song"	Conley	3:09
2.	"Max Ernst"	Miller	3:00
3.	"Devotion"	Conley	3:41
4.	"Execution"	Miller	2:21
5.	"That's When I Reach for My Revolver"	Conley	3:53
6.	"Outlaw"	Miller	2:34
7.	"Fame and Fortune"	Miller	3:35
8.	"This Is Not a Photograph"	Miller	1:57
9.	"Red"	Miller	3:38
10.	"All World Cowboy Romance"	Conley, Miller	5:12

== Personnel ==
Credits from the album's liner notes.

Mission of Burma

- Clint Conley – bass guitar, vocals, guitar
- Roger Miller – guitar, vocals
- Peter Prescott – drums, vocals
- Martin Swope – tape

Production

- Richard W. Harte – production
- John Kiehl – engineering
- Holly Anderson – cover and sleeve design
- Mission of Burma – cover and sleeve design
- Neal Trousdale – sleeve photography
