= Live at the Bradford =

Live album

Live at the Bradford is the official video of the two farewell shows of post-punk group Mission of Burma held at the Bradford Hotel in 1983.

== Background ==
In 1983, the post-punk band Mission of Burma performed two farewell shows at the Bradford Hotel in Boston. The band was calling it quits due to guitarist Roger Miller's worsening tinnitus (ringing in the ears).

As the only official video from Burma's early period, Live at the Bradford was directed by Paul Rachman and produced by Jim Coffman, the band's former manager. The performance was short when compared to the actual shows (which were typically two long sets each), the sound in the video is low quality, the editing amateurish (3 cameras, and filmed from stage left), and the video quality is grainy and oversaturated.

Despite its limitations, it is a rare peek back in time to the heyday of Boston's local music scene. Live at the Bradford offers a glimpse of what a live Mission of Burma performance back in the day was all about. With energy, sweat and stage divers galore, plus unforgettable live versions of "Fun World" and "Revolver".

On March 18, 2008, Matador Records released the full evening set as a DVD accompanying the remastered The Horrible Truth About Burma (OLE 732–2). This DVD includes the VHS version for posterity. The early set from the Bradford is also available as a companion disc to the studio album Vs. (OLE 731–2).

== Track listing ==
1. "That's How I Escaped My Certain Fate"
2. "Mica"
3. "Outlaw"
4. "Peking Spring"
5. "He Is, She Is"
6. "Go Fun Burn Man"
7. "Fun World"
8. "Max Ernst"
9. "Secrets"
10. "That's When I Reach for My Revolver"
11. "Academy Fight Song"

== Full track listing for complete evening set at the Bradford ==
1. "This Is Not A Photograph"
2. "Mica"
3. "He Is, She Is"
4. "Outlaw"
5. "Peking Spring"
6. "Trem Two"
7. "Go Fun, Burn Man"
8. "Fun World"
9. "Blackboard"
10. "See My Friend"
11. "Max Ernst"
12. "That's How I Escaped My Certain Fate"
13. "Einstein's Day"
14. "Dumbells"
15. "That's When I Reach for My Revolver"
16. "Secrets"
17. "Academy Fight Song"
