= Thing of Beauty (album) =

1989 studio album by Volcano Suns

Studio album by Volcano Suns
- Released: 1989
- Genre: Alternative rock, indie rock
- Label: SST (257)

Volcano Suns chronology
Farced (1988)	Thing of Beauty (1989)	Career in Rock (1991)

Professional ratings
Review scores
Source	Rating
AllMusic	4/5 stars

Thing of Beauty is a double album by the alternative rock band Volcano Suns, released in 1989 on SST Records. The album was the group's first to feature David Kleiler Jr. as primary guitarist, with previous guitarist Chuck Hahn having exited the group.

The album sees the band functioning more democratically. Kleiler and bassist Bob Weston contribute lead vocals on several songs, while the band occasionally exchanges instruments; Peter Prescott's guitar playing setting a precedent for his focus on the instrument in his later project, Kustomized.

== Track listing ==
Side one

1. "Barricade"
2. "It's a Conspiracy"
3. "Man Outstanding"
4. "Courageous Stunts"
5. "No Place"

Side two

1. "Noodle on the Couch"
2. "Ask the Pundits"
3. "Arm and a Leg"
4. "How to Breathe"
5. "Rite of Way"

Side three

1. "Soft Hit"
2. "Malamondo"
3. "Deeply Moved"
4. "Now File"
5. "Fill the Void"

Side four

1. "Nightmare Country"
2. "Needles in the Camel's Eye"
3. "Kick Out the Jams" (CD/cassette only)
4. "Red Eye Express" (CD/cassette only)
5. "Mud"
6. "Veteran"
7. "Hang-Up"
