= Bumper Crop (album) =

Studio album by Volcano Suns
- Released: 1987
- Genre: Alternative rock
- Label: Homestead

Volcano Suns chronology
All-Night Lotus Party (1986)	Bumper Crop (1987)	Farced (1988)

Professional ratings
Review scores
Source	Rating
AllMusic	3/5 stars
Robert Christgau	B−
Melody Maker	(unfavorable)
New Musical Express	8/10

Bumper Crop is an album by Volcano Suns, released in 1987.

== Track listing ==
The vinyl LP featured these 11 tracks.

No.	Title	Length
1.	"Magic Sky"	2:56
2.	"Offsprings"	3:40
3.	"The Central"	2:56
4.	"Local Wise Man"	3:00
5.	"Time Off"	5:42
6.	"Wellness"	3:29
7.	"Bumper Crop"	4:15
8.	"Curse of the Name"	3:35
9.	"Lummox"	3:58
10.	"Peal Out"	3:05
11.	"Testify"	5:57

The cassette and CD added this bonus track.

No.	Title	Length
12.	"Color My World"	2:39

The CD also contained a second bonus track.

No.	Title	Length
13.	"Tree Stomp"	1:56

== Personnel ==
- Sean Slade & Volcano Suns – producer
- Peter Prescott – drums, vocals
- Bob Weston – bass
- Chuck Hahn – guitar, background vocals
