= The Bright Orange Years =

Studio album by Volcano Suns
- Released: 1985
- Genre: Alternative rock
- Label: Homestead, Merge

Volcano Suns chronology
The Bright Orange Years (1985)	All-Night Lotus Party (1986)

Professional ratings
Review scores
Source	Rating
AllMusic	4.5/5 stars
Pitchfork Media	8.2/10

The Bright Orange Years is a 1985 record from the band Volcano Suns.

In 2009, the album was remastered by engineer Bob Weston and reissued by Merge Records with bonus tracks.

== Track listing ==
All songs written by Peter Prescott unless otherwise noted.

No.	Title	Writer(s)	Length
1.	"Jak"		2:14
2.	"Descent into Hell"		2:25
3.	"Truth Is Stranger than Fishing"	Jeff Weigand	2:39
4.	"Balancing Act"	Peter Prescott/Stephen Michener	3:31
5.	"Promise Me"		2:15
6.	"(I'm Gonna) Make You Mine"		3:09
7.	"Cover"		2:20
8.	"The Mouth that Roared"		3:18
9.	"Cornfield"		3:49
10.	"Animals"		2:28
11.	"It's Stewtime"		3:57
12.	"Silvertone"	Peter Prescott/Jon Williams	3:15
13.	"Sea Cruise" (Bonus track on 2009 re-release)	Peter Prescott/Jeff Weigand/Jon Williams	3:27
14.	"Greasy Spine" (Bonus track on 2009 re-release)	Peter Prescott/Jeff Weigand/Jon Williams	4:01
15.	"Tree Stomp" (Bonus track on 2009 re-release)		1:51
16.	"Nature and Me" (Bonus track on 2009 re-release)	Peter Prescott/Gary Waleik/ Stephen Michener	2:04
17.	"Old Paint" (Bonus track on 2009 re-release)		2:36
18.	"The Central" (Bonus track on 2009 re-release)	Peter Prescott/Gary Waleik	2:45
19.	"Local Wise Man" (Bonus track on 2009 re-release)		1:48
20.	"Testify (Live on WERS)" (Bonus track on 2009 re-release)		5:05
21.	"1999 (Live on WERS)" (Bonus track on 2009 re-release)	Prince	4:54
Total length:			1:03:47

== Personnel ==
- Lou Giordano – engineer
- Volcano Suns – producer
- Peter Prescott – drums, vocals
- Jeff Weigand – bass, vocals, photography
- Jon Williams – guitar, vocals
