= A Gun to the Head: A Selection from the Ace of Hearts Era =

Compilation album by Mission of Burma
- Released: September 14, 2004
- Length: 55:07

Mission of Burma chronology
| ONoffON (2004) | A Gun to the Head: A Selection from the Ace of Hearts Era (2004) | Snapshot (2004) |

Professional ratings
Review scores
| Source | Rating |
|---|---|
| AllMusic | 4/5 stars |
| Pitchfork | 9.0/10 |

A Gun to the Head: A Selection from the Ace of Hearts Era is a compilation album by Mission of Burma, released in 2004.

== Track listing ==
1. "Academy Fight Song" – 3:09
2. "(That's When I Reach for My) Revolver" – 3:53
3. "Fame & Fortune" – 3:35
4. "(This Is Not A) Photograph" – 1:57
5. "All World Cowboy Romance" – 5:12
6. "Trem Two" – 4:11
7. "Learn How" – 3:57
8. "Dead Pool" – 4:06
9. "Mica" – 3:31
10. "Weatherbox" – 3:28
11. "Fun World" – 3:41
12. "That's How I Escaped My Certain Fate" – 2:04
13. "Einstein's Day" – 4:36
14. "The Ballad of Johnny Burma" – 2:00
15. "Peking Spring" (Live) – 3:51
16. "Go Fun Burn Man" (Live) – 1:56
