= Lyres (band) =

American garage rock band (1979–2026)

- Origin: Boston, Massachusetts, US
- Genres: Garage rock
- Years active: 1979–2026

Lyres were a Boston-based garage rock band led by Jeff "Monoman" Conolly. Formed in 1979, their most popular songs include "Don't Give It Up Now", "She Pays The Rent" and "Help You Ann".

== History ==
The original lineup of the band featured Conolly (organ and vocals), Rick Coraccio (bass), Ricky Carmel (guitar), and Paul Murphy (drums). Conolly, Corracio and Murphy played together in the punk/garage rock band DMZ.

In 1981, The Boston Phoenix described Lyres as "the city's reigning garage band." In December of that year, the New Musical Express (NME) praised the band's first EP, AHS 1005, and its "infectious rhythms". NME's Richard Grabel wrote that Lyres had "an understanding of the dynamics of interplay between rhythm guitar and cheesy organ that borders on the remarkable" and that "what they do is too perfect to ever be out of fashion."

Former DMZ members Coraccio, Murphy, Peter Greenberg, and Mike Lewis all rejoined Conolly in Lyres at some point from 1979 to the early 2000s. The A-Bones drummer Miriam Linna (a former drummer for the Cramps) and the A-Bones and Yo La Tengo bass player Mike Lewis filled in with Lyres for a show in 1986. Stiv Bators of the Dead Boys and Lords of the New Church, and Wally Tax of the Outsiders also recorded with the Lyres in the late 1980s.

Connolly moved to California in 1989, and Lyres became less active. They performed off and on until 2026, going through a large number of personnel changes. Conolly was the only constant. Their final show was in February 2026.

In March 2026, Conolly revealed that he had been diagnosed with bladder cancer, setting up a GoFundMe page to raise funds for treatment. A benefit show at the Boston nightclub The Middle East featured local bands including Mission of Burma, The Dogmatics, Classic Ruins, Unnatural Axe, and The Flies. Conolly died at his home on July 31, 2026, at the age of 69.

== "Help You Ann" and "She Pays The Rent" ==
The song "Help You Ann" was released as a single in 1983 and as the second track of Lyres' debut LP, On Fyre, in 1984. It was named number 13 on the list of the greatest Boston songs of all time published by Boston magazine in 2006. The single ranked number 24 on The Village Voice annual Pazz & Jop critics' poll for 1983. Blender magazine placed it at number 360 on their list of the 500 best songs from 1980 to 2005. The song was recorded by the Chesterfield Kings on a 1998 single and covered by Courtney Love on her live shows in the early 2000s. Love has expressed her admiration for Lyres a number of times.

Swedish band the Nomads released a version of the Lyres' tune "She Pays The Rent" in 1985 as the A-side of a single. Music critics highlighted the horn section, which was unusual for garage rock bands.

== Members ==
=== Final lineup ===
- Jeff Conolly (organ, vocals)
- Bob Schena (guitar)
- Paul Murphy (drums)
- Kevin Pinkham (bass, vocals )

=== Previous members ===
- Steve Aquino (guitar)
- John Bernardo (drums)
- Timm Buechler (bass)
- Ricky Carmel (guitar)
- Rick Coraccio (bass)
- Jared Everett (guitar)
- Howard Ferguson (drums)
- Peter Greenberg (guitar)
- Jeff Gregory (drums)
- Jack Hickey (guitar)
- Jim Janota (drums)
- Alex Kronos (guitar)
- Phil Lenker (bass)
- Mike Lewis (bass)
- Bob MacKenzie (drums)
- Danny McCormack (guitar)
- Matt Miklos (bass)
- Paul Murphy (drums)
- T.J. O'Brien (guitar)
- Scott Parmenter (bass)
- Jeff Phelps (bass)
- Carl Rusk (guitar)
- Ron Silva (drums)
- John Smith (drums)
- Dave Szczepaniak (bass)
- Tom Ward (bass)
- Judd Williams (drums)

== Discography (incomplete) ==
=== LP albums ===
- On Fyre (Ace of Hearts, AHS 10005, 1984)
- Lyres Lyres (Ace of Hearts, AHS 10015, 1986)
- The Box Set (New Rose, licensed from Ace of Hearts, 1986)
- Recorded Live At Cantones (Pryct PR-1003, 1987)
- A Promise Is a Promise (Ace of Hearts, AHS 10025, 1988)
- She Pays the Rent Live (Impossible Records, 009, 1988)
- Live 1983 Let's Have A Party!! (Pryct PR-1004, 1989)
- Happy Now (Impossible Record, 028,1992 / Taang! Records, T66, 1993)
- Some Lyres (Taang! Records, T82, 1994)
- Live At The Rat, Sept 3, 1980 (Crypt Records, 2019)
- On Fyre at the Rusty Nail 1985 (Teen Sounds/Chunk Archives 2025)

=== EPs ===
- AHS1005 12" 45 rpm (Ace of Hearts, AHS 1005, 1981) [title commonly referenced as Buried Alive after the first track on the disc]
- Someone Who'll Treat You Right Now (Ace of Hearts, AHS 2005, 1985)
- Lyres (New Rose, 1985)
- Nobody But Lyres 12" 33 rpm (Taang! Records, 1992)

=== Singles ===
- "How Do You Know?" b/w "Don't Give It Up Now" (Sounds Interesting S145-002A/B, 1979)
- "Help You Ann" b/w "I Really Want You Right Now" (Ace of Hearts, 1983)
- "Someone Who'll Treat You Right Now" b/w "You've Been Wrong" (Ace of Hearts, AHS 115, 1985)
- "How Do You Know?" b/w "Stacey" (New Rose, NEW97, 1985)
- "Here's a Heart (w/Stiv)" b/w "Touch" and "She's Got Eyes That Tell Lies" (Ace of Hearts, AHS 2015, 1988)
- "Touch" b/w "Jezebel" and "Go-Go Girl" (New Rose NEW 116, 1988)
- "We Sell Soul" b/w "Busy Body" (Taang! Records, 62 NR 18682-1, 1991)
- "Baby (I Still Need Your Lovin')" b/w "Gettin' Plenty Lovin'" (Norton Records 45-013, 1992)
- "Self Centered Girl" b/w "What's A Girl Like You Doing In A Place Like This?" (Telstar Records TR11, 1993)
- "Boston" b/w "Shake It Some More" (Norton Records 45-20, 1993)
- "Baby It's Me" b/w "I'll Make It Up To You" (Chunk Records, CH456, 1994)
- "Stay Away b/w "Grounded" (Moulty Records, M106, 1994)
- "7" b/w "Feelin' No Pain" (Moulty Records, M108, 1995)
- "Give Your Love To Me" b/w "Security" (Norton Records, 45-035, 1995)
- The Chesterfield Kings / The Lyres – "Help You Ann" / "She Told Me Lies" (Living Eye, LSD 6, 1998)
- "Tear You Up" b/w "Felice Noddydod" (D.U.I. Records, DUI 004, 2003)
- "Soapy" b/w "You'll Never Do It Baby" (Munster Records, MR 7246, 2012)
- "Don't Give It Up Now" c/w "How Do You Know?" (Dirty Water Records)

=== Compact Discs ===
- On Fyre + 8 Bonus Tracks (New Rose 35 CD, 1984)
- Lyres Lyres (New Rose, 103 CD, 1986)
- A Promise Is a Promise (Ace Of Hearts, AHS 325, 1988)
- Those Lyres (Norton Records, CED 240, 1995)
- The Early Years Live 1979 - 1983 (Crypt Records, CR-057, 1997)

=== Compilations ===
- Various – Hotel Massachusetts (Chunk Records, CHD1005, 1994)
- We Sell Soul (Impossible Records, IMP021, 1991)
- Various – DIY: Punk, Power Pop, And New Wave 1976–1983 (Rhino, PRO2 90134, 1992)
- Various – DIY: Mass. Ave. – The Boston Scene (1975–83) (Rhino, R2 71179, 1993)
- Various – Turban Renewal – A Tribute To Sam The Sham & The Pharaohs (Norton, ED-234, 1994)
- Various – Cheapo Crypt Sampler (Crypt Records, CR-CD-1443, 1994)
- Shitkickers (Impossible Records, IMP041, 1995)
- Those Lyres (Norton Records, CED 240, 1995)
- Various – Left Of The Dial: Dispatches From The 80s Underground (Rhino, R2 76490, 2004)
- Various – Destroy All Humans! 2: Soundtrack (Lakeshore Records, LKS 338802, 2006)

== In other media ==
The song "Help You Ann" was featured on the game Destroy All Humans! 2 and on the TV show Rescue Me.

== Related bands ==
- Barrence Whitfield and the Savages – Howard Ferguson, Peter Greenberg, Phil Lenker
- DMZ – Jeff Conolly, Mike Lewis, Peter Greenberg, Paul Murphy
- The Real Kids – Howard Ferguson
- The Zantees – Mike Lewis
- The A-Bones – Mike Lewis
- Yo La Tengo – Mike Lewis
- Darker My Love – Jared Everett
- Orange Rooftops – T.J. O'Brien, Jeff Gregory, Jeff Phelps, Jason Eaton
