= Vs. (Mission of Burma album) =

Studio album by Mission of Burma
- Released: October 11, 1982
- Recorded: January–April 1982
- Studios: Normandy Sound, Rhode Island, United States
- Genres: Post-punk; punk rock
- Length: 41:30
- Label: Ace of Hearts
- Producer: Richard W. Harte

Mission of Burma chronology
Signals, Calls, and Marches (1981)	Vs. (1982)	The Horrible Truth About Burma (1985)

Vs. is the debut studio album by American post-punk band Mission of Burma, following their 1981 EP, Signals, Calls, and Marches. It was released in October 1982 by record label Ace of Hearts. It is the only full-length studio album the band released during the 1980s – and until 2004, as soon afterward they disbanded due to guitarist Roger Miller's worsening tinnitus.

== Recording and content ==
Whereas 1981's Signals, Calls, and Marches was notable for its accessible and organized qualities, Vs. saw Mission of Burma make a deliberate effort to record the chaos and noise that characterized their live performances. To help capture their live sound, the album was recorded in a large room at Normandy Sound studios in Rhode Island.

The songs on the album feature a greater presence of band member Martin Swope's electronic and tape sound effects than with the band's previous recordings.

Mission of Burma guitarist Roger Miller considered Vs. to be the band's best recording, and among the greatest rock and roll albums ever made.

== Critical reception ==
Professional ratings
Review scores
Source	Rating
AllMusic	4.5/5 stars
The Austin Chronicle	4/5 stars
Entertainment Weekly	A+
The Line of Best Fit	10/10
Pitchfork	9.5/10
PopMatters	9/10
Q	4/5 stars
The Rolling Stone Album Guide	4/5 stars
Spin Alternative Record Guide	8/10
The Village Voice	B+

Vs. has been well received by critics, immediately receiving positive reviews from publications like The New York Times. In a pre-release review of the track "Trem Two," The Boston Phoenix said "it sounds like the creation, destruction, and rebirth of the universe in four minutes." Despite strong reviews, the noisier sound caused the album to be considered less appropriate for radio airplay than previous Mission of Burma recordings. Robert Christgau, who originally gave it a "B+" in The Village Voice, later said he should have graded it an "A−".

In his retrospective review, Mark Deming of AllMusic opined that Vs. saw Mission of Burma "[mature] into a band whose sound was as distinctive as anyone of its generation. [...] It's daunting to imagine just how far Mission of Burma could have taken its music had Roger Miller's hearing problems not caused the band to break up the following year, but regardless of lost potential, very few American bands from the 1980s released an album as ambitious or as powerful as Vs."

== Legacy ==
The album ranked at number 49 on Pitchfork's "Top 100 Albums of the 1980s" list. In 2016, Rolling Stone magazine ranked the album number 25 on their list of the 40 Greatest Punk Albums.

== Track listing ==
All tracks are written by Roger Miller, except where noted.

Side A
No.	Title	Writer(s)	Length
1.	"Secrets"		3:22
2.	"Train"	Clint Conley	3:31
3.	"Trem Two"		4:10
4.	"New Nails"		3:00
5.	"Dead Pool"	Conley	4:05
6.	"Learn How"	Peter Prescott	3:56

Side B
No.	Title	Writer(s)	Length
1.	"Mica"	Conley, Holly Anderson	3:34
2.	"Weatherbox"		3:29
3.	"The Ballad of Johnny Burma"		2:00
4.	"Einstein's Day"		4:34
5.	"Fun World"		3:40
6.	"That's How I Escaped My Certain Fate"	Conley	2:04

CD reissue bonus tracks
No.	Title	Writer(s)	Length
13.	"Forget"		2:59
14.	"OK/No Way"	Conley	1:58
15.	"Laugh the World Away"		3:54
16.	"Progress"	Conley	3:06

Note

- The Matador Definitive Edition CD has the same bonus tracks, but they are in a different order: "Laugh the World Away", "Forget", “Progress", "OK/No Way".

== Personnel ==
Mission of Burma

- Martin Swope – tape operation, percussion, cover and sleeve design
- Clint Conley – bass guitar, vocals, percussion, cover and sleeve design
- Roger Miller – guitar, vocals, piano, trumpet, percussion, cover and sleeve design
- Peter Prescott – drums, vocals, percussion, cover and sleeve design

Technical

- Richard W. Harte – production
- John Kiehl – engineering
- Holly Anderson – cover and sleeve design
- Diane Bergamasco – sleeve photography
