= Career in Rock =

Studio album by Volcano Suns
- Released: 1991
- Genre: Alternative rock
- Label: Quarterstick
- Producer: Steve Albini

Volcano Suns chronology
Thing of Beauty (1989)	Career in Rock (1991)

Career in Rock is an album by the American band Volcano Suns, released in 1991. The album was recorded by the fourth lineup of the band. It was produced by Steve Albini.

Career in Rock was the band's final album; they announced a breakup before a 1992 show in Chicago.

== Critical reception ==
Professional ratings
Review scores
Source	Rating
AllMusic	2/5 stars

The Boston Herald wrote that the band "never failed to produce an aggressive, tuneful—and loud—punk rush."

== Track listing ==
Side one

1. "Blue Rib"
2. "Binds That Tie"
3. "Mystery Date"
4. "Silly Misunderstanding"
5. "Total Eclipse"

Side two

1. "Horrorscope"
2. "Punching Bag"
3. "Show"
4. "Sensitachio"
5. "Hey Monarch"

== Personnel ==
- Recorded by Steve Albini
- Peter Prescott
- Robert Weston
- David Kleiler
