= Moving Parts =

American rock band

Moving Parts was a late 1970s Boston-based rock music band. Though short-lived and little noticed during their career, the band's members went on to form parts of the more influential bands Birdsongs of the Mesozoic and Mission of Burma.

The band's members were Roger Miller (guitar), Clint Conley (bass guitar), Erik Lindgren (keyboards), and Boby Bear (drums); all but Bear shared songwriting and singing duties. Their main release, the archival 1992 compilation Wrong Conclusion features previously unreleased tracks from 1978 that range from absurd synthpop ("Good Oscillations") to artsy abstraction ("Max Ernst") to driving guitar rock ("Talk Talk").

After Moving Parts broke up due to creative disagreements, Conley and Miller founded Mission of Burma, Miller and Lindgren co-founded Birdsongs of the Mesozoic.
