= The Fools =

Rock band from Massachusetts, USA

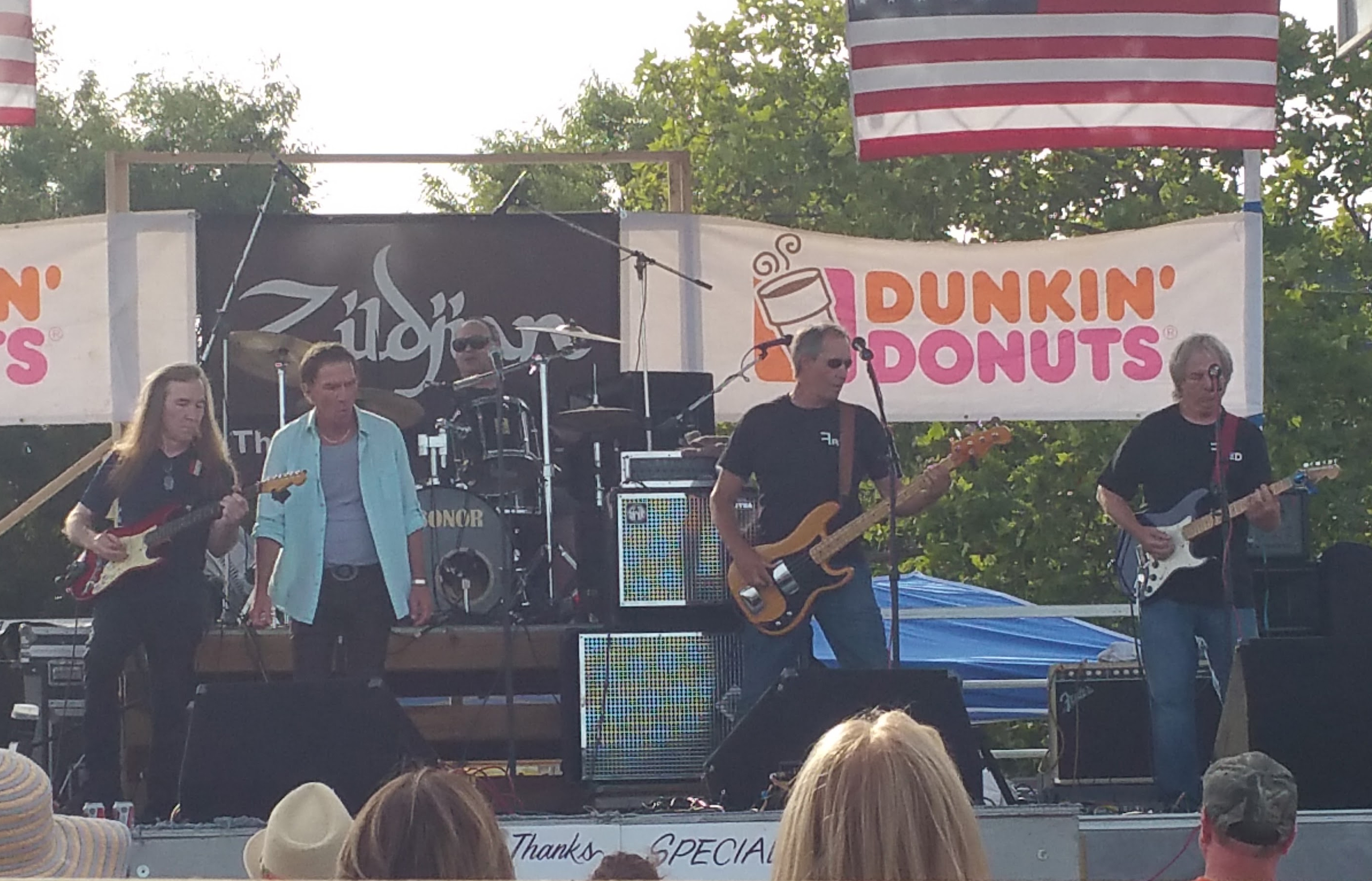
The Fools performing in Scituate, Massachusetts, 2015

The Fools are a Massachusetts rock band best known for the party atmosphere of their live performances and tongue-in-cheek original songs, covers and parodies.

== History ==
Hailing from Ipswich, Massachusetts, the band was previously named "The Rhythm A's", where future Nervous Eaters' Steve Cataldo, Robb Skeen, and Jeff Wilkinson were joined by singer Mike Girard and guitarist Rich Bartlett. By 1976, Girard and Bartlett teamed up with Stacey Pedrick (guitar), Doug Forman (bass), and Chris Pedrick (drums), becoming The Fools.

In 1979, the band released "Psycho Chicken", a parody of Talking Heads' "Psycho Killer", and it was an immediate hit on Boston radio stations. The group followed it up with "It's a Night for Beautiful Girls," which peaked at #67 on the Billboard charts. EMI signed the band and sent them on a U.S. tour with The Knack. Shortly after, they recorded their debut album, Sold Out.

In 1981, the band released their second album Heavy Mental, which featured a cover of Roy Orbison's "Running Scared" that reached #50 on the Billboard Hot 100. That year, The Fools were the opening band for Van Halen on their Fair Warning tour.

Shortly before being dropped by EMI, Chris Pedrick departed and was replaced by drummer Leo Black. Shortly after, Forman decided to leave, his void filled by bassist Joe Holaday.

In 1985, The Fools released World Dance Party on the independent label PVC. Four of the album's songs - "World Dance Party", "Life Sucks...Then You Die", "She Makes Me Feel Big", and a remake of Manfred Mann's "Do Wah Diddy" - received considerable radio airplay throughout New England and the video for "Do Wah Diddy" was shown extensively on MTV.

In 2003, after seven years of part-time duty, the band returned to a full schedule. Bassist Lou Spagnola had replaced Joe Holaday, who by then was working with the Beatles tribute band Beatlejuice. Holaday does, however, continue to make occasional appearances with the band.

In 2010, Mike Girard's book Psycho Chicken & Other Foolish Tales published by Sons of Liberty Publishers hit the stores, which outlined the sometimes hilarious history of the band. The band continues to tour today.

In February 2012, Lou Spagnola left the band and was then replaced by Bassist Eric Adamson.

== Discography ==
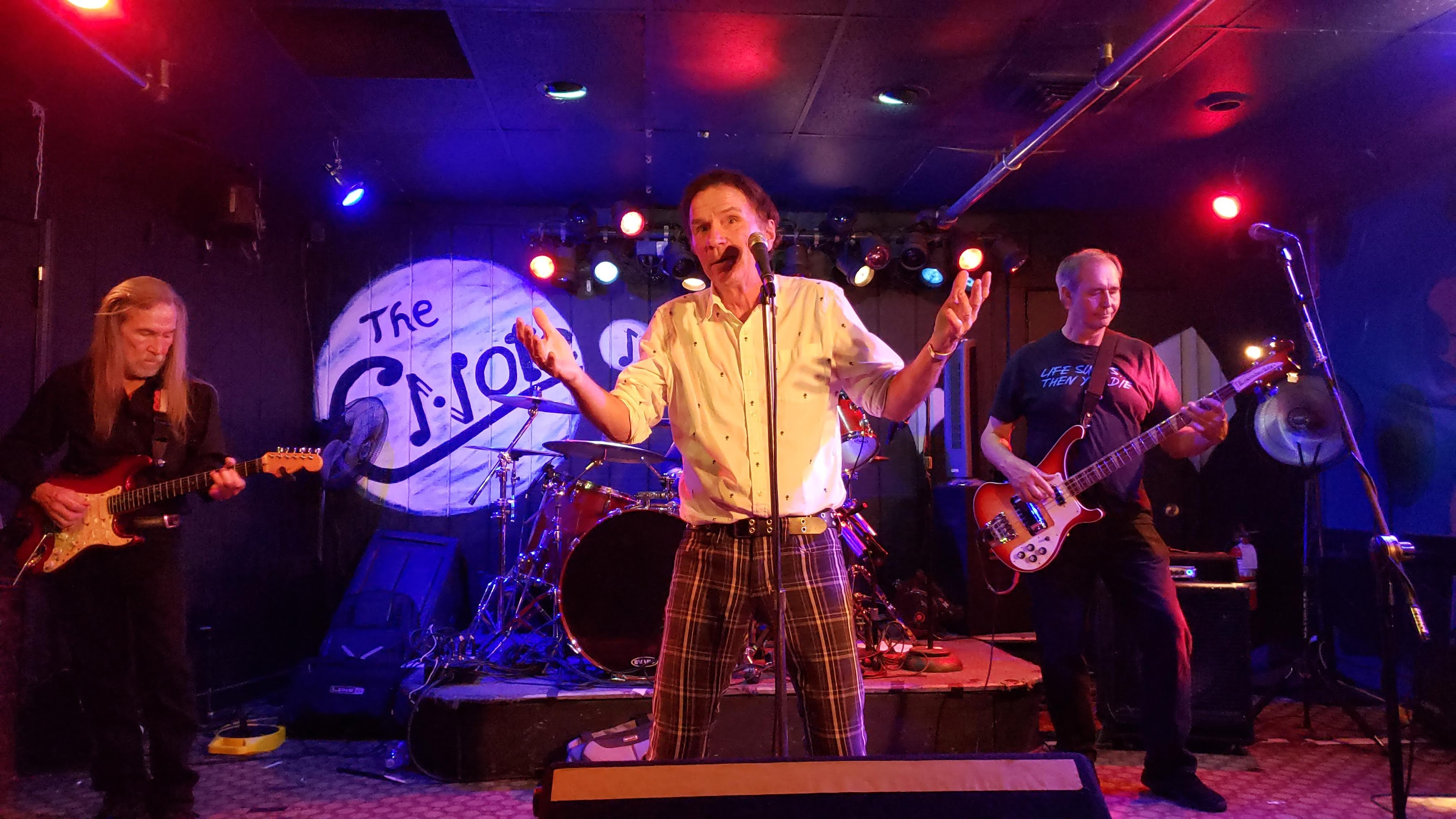
The Fools performing in Hull, Massachusetts, 2018

Albums

- Sold Out, EMI America, 1980
- First Annual Official Unofficial April Fools Day Live Bootleg (Live), EMI America, 1980
- Heavy Mental, EMI America, 1981
- Out Of My Head, Invasion Records, 1983
- World Dance Party, PVC, 1985
- Wake Up It's Alive (Live), PVC, 1988
- Rated XXX, Ouch Records, 1990
- World Dance Party Too (Reissue), Ouch Records, 1990
- Show 'Em You're Nuts, Ouch Records, 1991
- Christmas Toons, Ouch Records, 1992
- Wake Up It's Alive Again (Live/Reissue), Ouch Records, 1993
- Y2K (EP), Ouch Records, 1999
- Coors Light Six Pack (Live), Ouch Records, 2000
- World Dance Party 2003 (Re-reissue), Ouch Records, 2003
- The F in Beach Album (Live), Ouch Records, 2003
- 10, Ouch Records, 2007
- Lost And Found, Discark (digital download), 2017

Video

- World Dance Party, Ouch Records, 2010 (filmed in 1985)

Singles

Year	Single	Hot 100	Album	Label
1978	"She Looks Alright In The Dark"	–	single only	Castle Music
1979	"Psycho Chicken"	–	single only	EMI America
1980	"It's A Night For Beautiful Girls"	67	Sold Out	EMI America
1980	"Easy For You"	–	Sold Out	EMI America
1981	"Running Scared"	50	Heavy Mental	EMI America
1981	"Talk To Loretta"	–	single only	EMI America
1982	"Hook In You"	–	single only	Johnny Apollo
1983	"Out Of My Head"	–	single only	Invasion
1984	"Life Sucks, Then You Die"	–	World Dance Party	PVC
1985	"World Dance Party (Remix)"/ "Doo Wah Diddy"	–	World Dance Party	PVC
