= All-Night Lotus Party =

Studio album by Volcano Suns
- Released: 1986
- Genre: Rock, punk
- Length: 31:23
- Label: Homestead, Merge
- Producer: Volcano Suns

Volcano Suns chronology
The Bright Orange Years (1985)	All-Night Lotus Party (1986)	Bumper Crop (1987)

All-Night Lotus Party is an album by the American band Volcano Suns, released in 1986.

In 2009, the album was remastered by Bob Weston and reissued by Merge Records with bonus tracks.

== Critical reception ==
Professional ratings
Review scores
Source	Rating
AllMusic	4/5 stars
Pitchfork	7.4/10

The New York Times wrote that "the Suns are defining their own punk-pop-metal turf." The Philadelphia Inquirer included the album among the 10 best of 1986, noting the "bashing sonic impact of punk [and] the melodic skill of the most accessible rock music." The Washington Post called "White Elephant" "an exemplary post-punk romp: clamorous and frenetic, but also melodic and tightly structured."

The AllMusic review by Andy Kellman states: "The noisier abandon is immediately apparent from Jon Williams' nasty abrasion at the beginning of 'White Elephant', undeniably sounding much like some of Roger Miller's more memorable antics in Mission of Burma. And with that song, as with The Bright Orange Years' 'Jak', the band once again sticks their catchiest (and funniest) song at the very beginning, as if to grab the listener by the throat, and the grip here never really slackens. Aside from the near-ballad 'Room with a View' and the schizo tempo shifts in 'Blown Stack', the first side—also highlighted by the charmingly sloppy neo-rockabilly of 'Cans' and the hurtling 'Walk Around'—whips by at breakneck speed, while the second side is slower yet no less rowdy or welcoming."

== Track listing ==
No.	Title	Writer(s)	Length
1.	"White Elephant"	Volcano Suns	2:59
2.	"Cans"	Jeff Weigand	2:22
3.	"Room with a View"	Peter Prescott, Jeff Weigand	3:17
4.	"Blown Stack"	Prescott	1:43
5.	"Engines"	Prescott	2:12
6.	"Walk Around"	Volcano Suns	2:22
7.	"Sounds Like Bucks"	Prescott	3:20
8.	"Four Letters"	Volcano Suns	2:56
9.	"Dot on the Map"	Prescott	4:04
10.	"Village Idiot"	Prescott	3:07
11.	"Ride the Cog"	Volcano Suns	2:15
12.	"Polythene Pam / Greasy Spine" (Bonus track on 2009 re-release)	Volcano Suns	4:50
13.	"Journey to the Center of the Mind" (Bonus track on 2009 re-release)	Ted Nugent, Steve Farmer	3:33
14.	"Jazz Odyssey" (Bonus track on 2009 re-release)		1:52
15.	"Walk Around Dub" (Bonus track on 2009 re-release)		2:36
16.	"Sounds LikeBucks (Live on WERS)" (Bonus track on 2009 re-release)		4:07
17.	"Ballad of Bilbo Baggins" (Bonus track on 2009 re-release)		2:47
18.	"Time Off" (Bonus track on 2009 re-release)		5:25
19.	"Magic Sky" (Bonus track on 2009 re-release)		3:01
20.	"Curse of the Name" (Bonus track on 2009 re-release)		3:08
21.	"Junior" (Bonus track on 2009 re-release)		3:04
22.	"superhappyfunmysterybonustrack2009" (Bonus track on 2009 re-release)		8:27

== Personnel ==
- Lou Giordano – engineer
- Peter Prescott – drums, vocals
- Volcano Suns – producer
- Jeff Weigand – bass, vocals, photography
- Jon Williams – guitar, vocals, engineer
