= Animal Rights (album) =

Studio album by Moby
- Released: September 23, 1996
- Recorded: Summer 1995 – Spring 1996 in Manhattan, New York
- Genres: Alternative rock; industrial rock; hardcore punk; digital hardcore; ambient; punk rock; gregorian music
- Length: 53:13 (UK release); 72:38 (US release)
- Labels: Mute; Elektra
- Producers: Moby; Alan Moulder

Moby chronology
Rare: The Collected B-Sides 1989–1993 (1996)	Animal Rights (1996)	I Like to Score (1997)

Singles from Animal Rights
- 1. "That's When I Reach for My Revolver" Released: August 26, 1996; 2. "Come On Baby" Released: November 4, 1996

Animal Rights is the fourth album by the American musician Moby, released on September 23, 1996. The album was a temporary style shift from the electronica music that Moby had previously released to an alternative rock sound influenced by the hardcore punk music that he had enjoyed as a teenager. The album was released to mediocre critical reviews and commercial performance.

== Background ==
Moby's decision to release a punk rock–influenced album was in part the result of being disillusioned by the lack of positive media feedback he had been receiving from the music media for his electronic works, which they struggled to comprehend and failed to take very seriously. Moby had previous experience performing rock music, having been a member of the groups Vatican Commandos and Ultra Vivid Scene in the 1980s.

The album was recorded between the summer of 1995 and spring of 1996 in Manhattan, New York. Moby worked alongside Alan Moulder in the making of the album. Just as Moby decided to change direction, the electronic music he moved away from started to gain recognition and popularity through artists like The Chemical Brothers and The Prodigy.

== Packaging ==
The cover photograph features Moby at two weeks old, being held by his grandfather. The album's liner notes contain various pictures, an essay on the course of basic rights over history, an essay outlining Moby's disregard for the Christian Coalition, and a page with various "last minute maxims", such as "cruelty is unacceptable" and "you can't expect people to worry about the world when they can't feed themselves or their children."

== Release ==
The first single from Animal Rights, released on August 26, 1996, was a cover of Mission of Burma's 1981 song "That's When I Reach for My Revolver". The single peaked at number 50 on the UK Singles Chart.

On September 23, 1996, Animal Rights was released in the United Kingdom, where it charted at number 38 on the UK Albums Chart. The first batch of released copies in the United Kingdom were packaged with a 49-minute bonus CD called Little Idiot. Consisting entirely of drum-free ambient tracks, it was the second in a line of ambient bonus CDs, following Underwater, which came with Everything Is Wrong. Little Idiot included reworkings of tracks from Animal Rights – it also features a drawing of Moby's character "Little Idiot", who would later appear on various music videos and single and album covers. A second single from Animal Rights, "Come On Baby", was released on November 4, 1996, but failed to chart.

Animal Rights was not released in Moby's native United States until five months later on February 11, 1997, with a different tracklisting. The album failed to chart on the Billboard 200, but reached number 31 on the Heatseekers Albums chart. Moby toured the record as the opening act for Soundgarden on their Down on the Upside tour, where he was met with largely unreceptive audiences. He also undertook a separate promotional tour for Animal Rights, where, he later recalled, he found himself playing to "roughly 50 people a night".

== Critical reception ==
Professional ratings
Review scores
Source	Rating
AllMusic	2/5 stars
Chicago Sun-Times	2.5/4 stars
Entertainment Weekly	C+
The Guardian	2/5 stars
Los Angeles Times	3/4 stars
Mojo	3/5 stars
NME	8/10
Rolling Stone	3/5 stars
Spin	4/10
The Village Voice	A−

Animal Rights received generally negative reviews upon its first release. Moby had earlier made his reputation with electronic music, but Animal Rights found him embracing punk rock and ambient music. While most critics praised his attempt at diversifying, Salon's Douglas Wolk opined that Animal Rights "finds Moby falling on his nose" and concluded that "maybe somebody should try to convince Moby that guitars are actually made out of dead animals", while Rolling Stone's Lorraine Ali felt that "this time around, he has decided to push an agenda instead of boundaries". However, James Oldham of NME wrote that "Animal Rights is a brave, turbulent and consistently exhilarating record", and Robert Christgau, writing in The Village Voice, said that the two discs "enrich and play off each other with the flow and coherence Everything Is Wrong lacks". Seeming to expect a negative critical reaction, Moby added the following entreaty to the bottom of the credits page: "please listen to animal rights in its entirety at least once."

== Legacy ==
According to Moby's manager Eric Härle, Animal Rights nearly ended Moby's career because not only did the new direction leave audiences cold – with music media uninterested and his existing fan base largely alienated by it – but it led to people being confused as to what kind of artist Moby really was. Having "wipe[d] out all of his early good work" in establishing himself, Moby was left struggling for any kind of recognition and quickly became seen as a "has-been" in the eyes of many people in the industry. In an interview for Rolling Stone, Moby admitted that the failure of Animal Rights, combined with the negative reception he received from Soundgarden's fanbase while touring the album, led him to consider quitting music. However, he chose to continue his career after other artists, including Terence Trent D'Arby, Axl Rose and Bono, personally told him they enjoyed the album. By 2002, Animal Rights had sold 100,000 copies worldwide.

Stephen Thomas Erlewine of AllMusic wrote that Animal Rights "ranks as one of the classic failed albums, right alongside Sinéad O'Connor's big-band Am I Not Your Girl?." On the other hand, Drowned in Sound critic Mark Reed, in a 2002 retrospective review, suggested that Animal Rights had been unfairly lambasted by contemporary critics for being unrepresentative of Moby's capabilities and for "daring to go against the grain", describing it as "one of the most underbought, underrated, unusual albums a major recording artist has ever produced." Additionally, despite the negative critical reaction, Moby has since named Animal Rights as his favorite of his albums.

== Track listing ==
All tracks are written by Moby, except where noted.

UK release
No.	Title	Writer(s)	Length
1.	"Now I Let It Go"		2:08
2.	"Come On Baby"		4:39
3.	"Someone to Love"		2:51
4.	"Heavy Flow"		1:54
5.	"You"		2:33
6.	"My Love Will Never Die"		4:32
7.	"Soft"		3:57
8.	"Say It's All Mine"		6:04
9.	"That's When I Reach for My Revolver"	Clint Conley	3:55
10.	"Face It"		10:01
11.	"Living"		6:59
12.	"Love Song for My Mom"		3:40
Total length:			53:13

US and Japanese release
No.	Title	Writer(s)	Length
1.	"Dead Sun"		3:40
2.	"Someone to Love"		3:09
3.	"Heavy Flow"		1:55
4.	"You"		2:33
5.	"Now I Let It Go"		2:09
6.	"Come On Baby"		4:30
7.	"Soft"		3:54
8.	"Anima"		2:25
9.	"Say It's All Mine"		6:04
10.	"That's When I Reach for My Revolver"	Conley	3:55
11.	"Alone"		10:45
12.	"Face It"		10:00
13.	"Old"		3:06
14.	"Living"		6:58
15.	"Love Song for My Mom"		3:38
16.	"A Season in Hell"		3:57
Total length:			72:38

Japanese bonus track
No.	Title	Length
17.	"New Dawn Fades"	5:32
Total length:		78:10

Bonus disc: Little Idiot
No.	Title	Length
1.	"Degenerate"	3:25
2.	"Dead City"	4:53
3.	"Walnut"	3:06
4.	"Old"	5:06
5.	"A Season in Hell"	4:01
6.	"Love Song for My Mom"	3:43
7.	"The Blue Terror of Lawns"	3:22
8.	"Dead Sun"	3:44
9.	"Reject"	18:28
Total length:		49:48

== Personnel ==
Credits for Animal Rights adapted from album liner notes.

- Moby – vocals, guitar, bass guitar, percussion, drums, keyboards, production, engineering, mixing
- Alan Moulder – engineering, mixing
- Hahn Rowe – violin

Artwork and design

- Damien Loeb – booklet back cover photography, logo design
- Moby – art direction, logo design, photography
- Alli Truch – art direction

== Charts ==
Chart (1996–97)	Peak position
Belgian Albums (Ultratop Flanders)	41
Scottish Albums (Official Charts)	45
UK Albums (Official Charts)	38
US Heatseekers Albums (Billboard)	31
