= The Neats =

American rock band

The Neats were an American rock band from Boston, Massachusetts, which existed from the late 1970s to early 1990s. They first recorded for the independent Propeller label, on which the band released the song "Six" in 1981. The following year, their well-received debut The Monkey's Head in the Corner of the Room, a 7-song EP, was released on Boston's Ace of Hearts Records. It was voted one of the best EPs of 1982 in Village Voice's annual Pazz & Jop poll. Three albums followed. They occasionally played on the same bill as Mission of Burma; they once toured nationally with R.E.M.

== Members ==
- Eric Martin – guitar, vocals, harmonica, vox organ
- Phil Caruso – guitar, vocals
- Jerry Channell – bass, vocals
- Jay Parham – bass, vocals (replaced Jerry Channell)
- David Lee – bass, guitar (replaced Jay Parham)
- Terry Hanley – drums

Contributed on Crash at Crush:

- Ted Pine – keyboards, vocals
- Dave Pedersen – vocals
- Stona Fitch – accordion, vocals
- Joe Harvard – guitar, vocals
- Akshay Obhrai – banjo, vocals

== Discography ==
=== EPs ===
- The Monkey's Head in the Corner of the Room (Ace of Hearts, 1982)

=== Albums ===
- Neats (Ace of Hearts, 1983)
- Crash at Crush (Coyote – Twin/Tone, 1987)
- Blues End Blue (Coyote – Twin/Tone, 1989)

=== Compilations ===
- "NEATS" 1981–84 The Ace of Hearts Years (Ace of Hearts, 2009)
- "Six" appears on DIY: Mass. Ave. – The Boston Scene (1975–83) (Rhino, 1993)
- "Six" appears on Propeller Product – 7" 33⅓ rpm EP (Propeller, 1981)
- "Do the Things" and a live version of "Another Broken Dream" appears on a Propeller cassette tape, sold by Newbury Comics in Boston (Propeller, 1981)
