= ONoffON =

Mission of Burma album

Studio album by Mission of Burma
- Released: May 4, 2004
- Genre: Post-punk, indie rock
- Length: 53:22
- Label: Matador

Mission of Burma chronology
The Horrible Truth About Burma (1985)	ONoffON (2004)	A Gun to the Head: A Selection from the Ace of Hearts Era (2004)

Professional ratings
Aggregate scores
Source	Rating
Metacritic	84/100
Review scores
Source	Rating
AllMusic	4.5/5 stars
Alternative Press	4/5
The Guardian	3/5 stars
Mojo	4/5 stars
Paste	4/5 stars
Pitchfork	8.8/10
Q	3/5 stars
Rolling Stone	3/5 stars
The Rolling Stone Album Guide	3.5/5 stars
Spin	A

ONoffON is the second studio album by American post-punk band Mission of Burma. It was released on May 4, 2004 by Matador Records, marking the band's first studio recording after a nineteen-year hiatus.

== Track listing ==
No.	Title	Writer(s)	Length
1.	"The Setup"	Roger Miller	3:08
2.	"Hunt Again"	Clint Conley	2:16
3.	"The Enthusiast"	Peter Prescott	3:37
4.	"Falling"	Miller	4:00
5.	"What We Really Were"	Conley; Holly Anderson	4:11
6.	"Max Ernst's Dream"	Miller	3:31
7.	"Fake Blood"	Prescott	3:32
8.	"Prepared"	Conley	3:02
9.	"Untitled"	Conley	0:15
10.	"Wounded World"	Miller	3:29
11.	"Dirt"	Conley	3:45
12.	"Into the Fire"	Miller	3:40
13.	"Fever Moon"	Miller	3:47
14.	"Nicotine Bomb"	Conley	3:16
15.	"Playland"	Miller	2:32
16.	"Absent Mind"	Prescott	5:21
Total length:			53:22

A special track, "Class War" (the Dils cover), was included on the double LP version of the album.

== Personnel ==
Mission of Burma

- Clint Conley - bass, guitar, vocals
- Peter Prescott - drums, percussion, sampling, vocals
- Roger Miller - guitars, keyboards, percussion, vocals, string arrangement
- Bob Weston - tape, loops
