= Unsound =

Unsound may refer to:

- Unsound (compilation album), a 2006 compilation album on Epitaph Records
- Unsound (film), a 2020 Australian film, nominated for the 2020 AACTA Award for Best Indie Film
- Unsound (Mission of Burma album), 2012
- Unsound Festival, a music festival that takes place in Krakow, Poland, and around the world

== See also ==
- Mental disorder ("unsound mind")
- Soundness, a concept in deductive reasoning (sound or unsound argument)
- Unsound Methods, a 1997 music album by Recoil
- Unsounded, a 2010 web graphic novel by Ashley Cope
