= Volcano Suns =

American alternative rock band

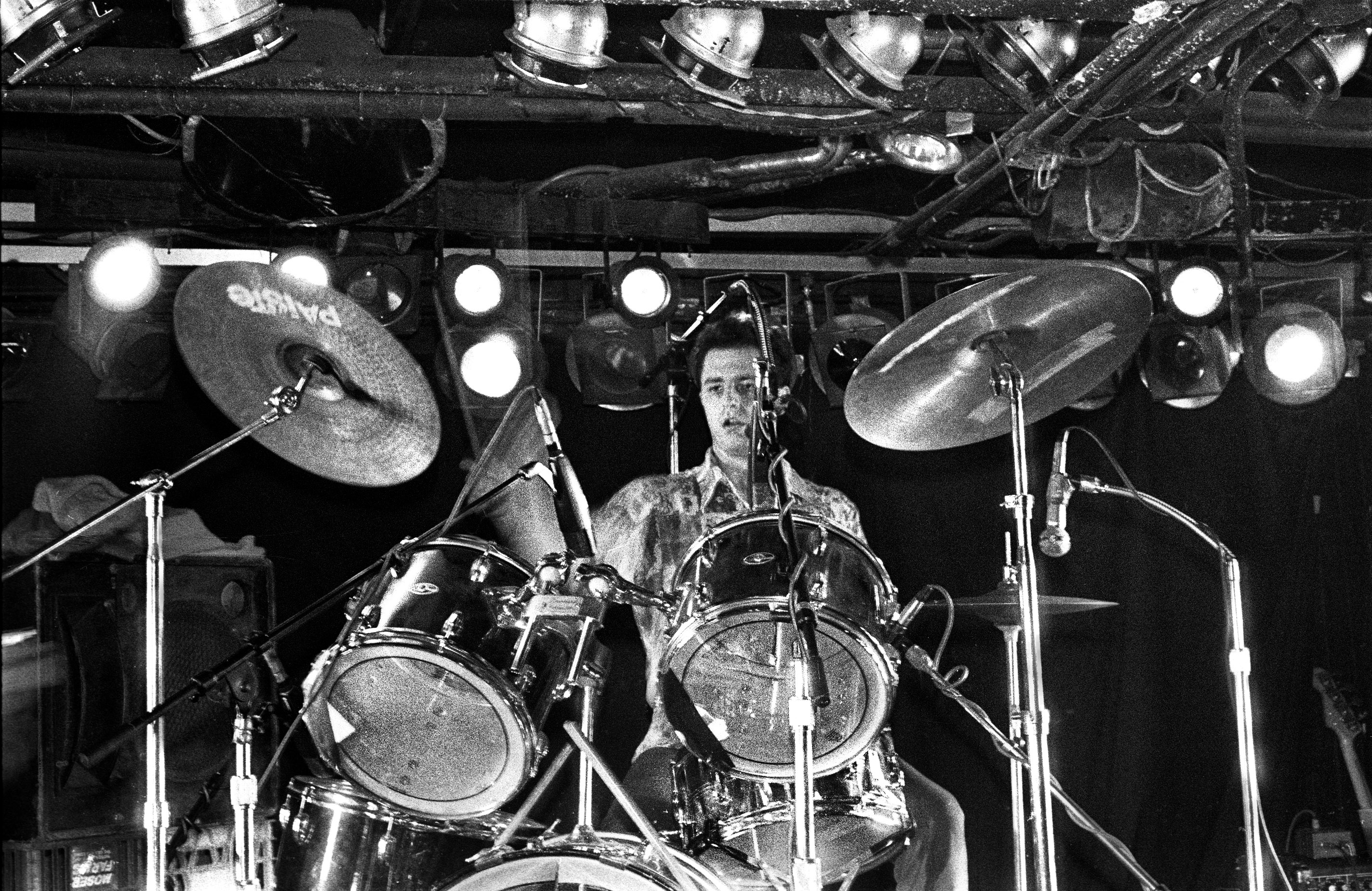
- Pete Prescott playing drums at the Rathskeller in Boston

Background information
- Origin: Boston, Massachusetts, United States
- Genre: Alternative rock
- Years active: 1984–1991, 2005
- Labels: SST, Homestead, Quarterstick
- Past members: Peter Prescott; Bob Weston; David Kleiler; Gary Waleik; Steve Michener; Jeff Weigand; Jon Williams; Chuck Hahn
- Website: Official website

Volcano Suns was an American alternative rock band from Boston, Massachusetts formed by Mission of Burma drummer Peter Prescott in 1984.

== History ==
The band was founded in Spring 1984 by former Mission of Burma and Molls drummer Peter Prescott, the only founding member of the Suns to remain until their break-up in 1991. Prescott had auditioned for the position of drummer with Disneyland, but took two of that band's members to form Volcano Suns; The other original members were Gary Waleik and Steve Michener who would leave after 16 months, before the release of the first Suns album, to eventually form Big Dipper. Prescott then added Jeff Weigand on bass guitar and Jon Williams on guitar. This second line-up created the band's debut album The Bright Orange Years (1985), as well as its follow-up, All-Night Lotus Party (1986), both released on the now-defunct Homestead Records. In 1987, Bob Weston and Chuck Hahn replaced Weigand and Williams respectively for Bumper Crop, the band's final release on Homestead. Other contributors included Roger Miller on piano and Gary Waleik on sitar.

In 1988, the band moved to Greg Ginn's SST Records for their 4th release, Farced. The line-up however was the same as on Bumper Crop, including Miller on piano and Waleik on sitar. 1989 brought their most experimental release, Thing of Beauty, also on SST, on which David Kleiler (formerly from the band Sorry) replaced Chuck Hahn on guitar. This would be the Volcano Suns' final line up. The band moved to Chicago-based indie label Quarterstick Records for their final release, Career in Rock in 1991. The album was engineered by Steve Albini, who would later work with Bob Weston in their band Shellac.

== Musical style and the Din ==
The music of the Volcano Suns is often compared to the works of bands like Hüsker Dü and Mudhoney.

From 1985-1987, the Volcano Suns second lineup also doubled as the Din, the backing band for vocalist Dredd Foole (a.k.a. Dan Ireton), who had previously collaborated with Mission of Burma. The Volcano Suns used stage names in the Din: Din Wanna (Prescott), Bonus "The Bone Man" McGinty (Weigand) and Webb Finga (Williams), with The Kaiser (Kenny Chambers from Moving Targets) rounding out the lineup. The collaboration produced two albums, Eat My Dust Cleanse My Soul (Homestead, 1985) and Take Off Your Skin (PVC, 1988).

== Post-Suns and reunion ==
The band split up in 1991. In 1994, Prescott went on to form Kustomized.

Prescott reformed Volcano Suns in 2005 with Weston and Kleiler for some reunion shows.

The band's first two albums were reissued by Merge Records in 2009, remastered by Weston and including bonus material. Merge also released a live album in 2014, recorded at City Gardens in New Jersey during the summer of 1986 featuring the Bright Orange/Lotus lineup, entitled "Old Pain(t)."

== Members ==
Final lineup

- Peter Prescott - drums, lead vocals (1984-1991, 2005)
- Bob Weston - bass (1987-1991, 2005)
- David Kleiler - guitar (1988-1991, 2005)

Past members

- Steve Michener - bass, vocals (1983-1984)
- Gary Waleik - guitar, vocals, sitar (1983-1984; guest appearances, 1987-1988)
- Jeff Weigand - bass (1984-1987)
- Jon Williams - guitar (1984-1987)
- Chuck Hahn - guitar (1987-1988)

== Discography ==
=== Albums ===
- The Bright Orange Years (Homestead, 1985 / Merge, January 2009)
- All-Night Lotus Party (Homestead, 1986 / Merge, January 2009)
- Bumper Crop (Homestead, 1987)
- Farced (SST, 1988)
- Thing of Beauty (SST, 1989)
- Career in Rock (Quarterstick, 1991)
- Old Pain(t) Live (Merge, July 2014)

=== Singles ===
- "Sea Cruise" b/w "Greasy Spine" (Homestead, 1986)
- "Blue Rib" b/w "Openings" (Quarterstick, 1990)

=== Compilation appearances ===
- Claws—The Third Throbbing Lobster Compilation (Throbbing Lobster, 1985)

song: "Tree Stomp"

- Materials and Processes (Materials and Processes, 1985)

song: "Silvertone"

- The New Originals (Materials and Processes, 1986)

song: "Polythene Pam"

- The Wailing Ultimate (Homestead, 1987)

song: "White Elephant"

- Human Music (Homestead, 1988)

song: "Ultravixen"

- Duck and Cover (SST, 1990)

song: "Kick Out the Jams"

As the Din, backing band for Dredd Foole

- Eat My Dust Cleanse My Soul (Homestead, 1987)
- Take Off Your Skin (PVC, 1988)
