= Farced =

Studio album by Volcano Suns
- Released: 1988
- Studio: Fort Apache South
- Genre: Post-punk
- Label: SST (210)
- Producers: Volcano Suns, Sean Slade

Volcano Suns chronology
Bumper Crop (1987)	Farced (1988)	Thing of Beauty (1989)

Farced is an album by the American band Volcano Suns. It was released in 1988 via SST Records.

== Critical reception ==
Professional ratings
Review scores
Source	Rating
AllMusic	3/5 stars
Robert Christgau	B+

The Providence Journal deemed the album "muscular post-punk guitar rock." Trouser Press concluded that "the band's melodic sense comes and goes; too many of the songs dissolve into a cacophonous blur." Robert Christgau praised the "half joke band" aspect of Volcano Suns. Spin included Farced on its list of "80 Excellent Records of the 80s".

== Track listing ==
- All lyrics by Peter Prescott, except track 1 (Bob Grant). All music as noted.

No.	Title	Length
1.	"Can I Have the Key? (Prescott)"	3:44
2.	"Brother Superior (Prescott)"	2:14
3.	"Belly Full of Lead (Chuck Hahn)"	2:58
4.	"Meat and Potatoes (Prescott)"	3:40
5.	"A Definite Maybe (Bob Weston)"	3:08
6.	"Where the Wrecks Go (Prescott)"	3:40
7.	"Nature and Me (Gary Waleik, Steve Michener, Prescott)"	2:05
8.	"Laff Riot (Julie Kantner, Prescott)"	4:04
9.	"Slopen Hood (Prescott)"	4:41
10.	"Commune (Prescott)"	2:28
11.	"What's Happening to Me? (Hahn, Prescott, Weston)"	3:54
12.	"Shriney (Prescott)"	4:01
13.	"Neck of Rubber (Prescott)"	3:52

== Personnel ==
Volcano Suns

- Peter Prescott – drums, vocals
- Bob Weston – bass, vocals, trumpet
- Chuck Hahn – guitar, vocals

Additional personnel

- Nick Maldonado: sampler
- Gary Waleik, Michael Cudany: guitars
- David Kleiler: guitars, backing vocals
- Chris George: sitar
- Tricia Matthews: violin, cello
