= The Sound the Speed the Light =

Studio album by Mission of Burma
- Released: October 6, 2009
- Studio: Squid Hell Studios, Jamaica Plain, Boston, Massachusetts
- Genre: Post-punk, indie rock
- Length: 41:34
- Label: Matador

Mission of Burma chronology
The Obliterati (2006)	The Sound the Speed the Light (2009)	Unsound (2012)

Professional ratings
Aggregate scores
Source	Rating
Metacritic	74/100
Review scores
Source	Rating
AllMusic	3.5/5 stars
The A.V. Club	B
BBC	favourable
Boston Globe	favorable
ChartAttack	3.5/5 stars
Drowned in Sound	7/10
Kerrang!	3/5 stars
Pitchfork	8.0/10
Tiny Mix Tapes	3.5/5 stars
Consequence of Sound	B
Spectrum Culture	3.5/5 stars

The Sound the Speed the Light is the fourth studio album by American post-punk band Mission of Burma, released in October 2009 by record label Matador. The album is the third post-reunion album.

== Track listing ==
1. "1, 2, 3, Partyy!" (Clint Conley) – 2:46
2. "Possession" (Roger Miller) – 4:27
3. "Blunder" (Peter Prescott) – 3:39
4. "Forget Yourself" (Miller) – 4:53
5. "After the Rain" (Miller) – 3:22
6. "SSL 83" (Conley) – 2:49
7. "One Day We Will Live There" (Prescott) – 2:43
8. "So Fuck It" (Miller) – 2:46
9. "Feed" (Holly Anderson and Conley) – 3:49
10. "Good Cheer" (Prescott) – 2:45
11. "Comes Undone" (Miller) – 3:08
12. "Slow Faucet" (Miller) – 4:27
