= Ace of Hearts Records (US) =

American independent record label

- Founded: 1978
- Founder: Rick Harte
- Genre: New wave, rock, garage rock
- Country of origin: U.S.
- Location: Boston, Massachusetts
- Official website: aceofheartsrecords.com

Ace of Hearts Records is a Boston-based independent label founded in 1978 by Rick Harte, who also produced all its releases. It recorded and released Boston area post-punk and garage rock bands in the early 1980s, including Mission of Burma, Birdsongs of the Mesozoic, Roger Miller, the Neats, Lyres, the Real Kids, John Felice, Nervous Eaters, the Del Fuegos, the Neighborhoods, Martin Paul, Wild Stares, Infliktors, Classic Ruins, Crab Daddy, Chaotic Past, Tomato Monkey, and Heat from a DeadStar.

== Overview ==
Ace of Hearts released recordings by bands based in Boston. One of their releases, "Prettiest Girl" by the Neighborhoods, sold ten thousand copies. The record company had been established in 1978 by Rick Harte.

== Discography ==
- Infliktors, "Where'd You Get That Cigarette", 1979 (45)
- Classic Ruins, 1+1<2, 1980 (EP – 3 songs)
- The Neighborhoods, "Prettiest Girl", 1980 (45 Vinyl)
- Mission of Burma, "Academy Fight Song", 1980 (45)
- Mission of Burma, Signals, Calls, and Marches, 1981 (EP – 6 songs)
- Mission of Burma, "Trem Two", 1981 (45)
- Mission of Burma, Vs., 1981 (LP)
- Lyres, AHS 1005, 1981 (EP – 4 songs)
- Lyres, "Help You Ann", 1981 (45)
- Neats, The Monkey's Head in the Corner of the Room, 1982 (EP – 7 songs)
- Neats, "Caraboo", 1983 (45)
- Neats, Neats, 1983 (LP)
- Birdsongs of the Mesozoic, Birdsongs of the Mesozoic, 1983 (EP – 5 songs)
- Lyres, On Fyre (New Rose), 1984 (LP+CD)
- Birdsongs of the Mesozoic, Magnetic Flip, 1984 (LP)
- Mission of Burma, The Horrible Truth About Burma, 1985 (LP)
- Lyres, "Someone Who'll Treat You Right"/"She Pays The Rent"/"You've Been Wrong", 1985 (12", 45)
- Lyres, "Someone Who'll Treat You Right", 1985 (45)
- Birdsongs of the Mesozoic, Beat of the Mesozoic, 1985 (EP – 5 songs)
- Nervous Eaters, Hot Steel and Acid, 1986 (CD – 9 songs)
- Lyres, Lyres Lyres (New Rose), 1986 (LP+CD)
- Roger Miller, No Man Is Hurting Me, 1986 (LP)
- Roger Miller, "Groping Hands", 1986 (12", 45)
- Roger Miller, The Big Industry, 1987 (LP, CD)
- Mission of Burma, Live at the Bradford, 1988 (video)
- Mission of Burma, Mission of Burma (Ryko), 1988 (CD comp.)
- Lyres, A Promise Is a Promise (New Rose), 1988 (LP+CD)
- Lyres, Box Set AHS 1005, On Fyre, A Promise Is a Promise (New Rose), 1988 (EP+LPs)
- Lyres, "Here's a Heart w/Stiv", 1988 (12", 45)
- Birdsongs of the Mesozoic, Sonic Geology (Ryko), 1988 (CD Comp.)
- John Felice and the Lowdowns, Nothing Pretty, 1988 (LP)
- John Felice and the Lowdowns, Nothing Pretty (New Rose), 1988 (CD)
- The Wild Stares, Land of Beauty, 1992 (CD)
- Tomato Monkey, Mostly Torso, 1992 (45)
- Chaotic Past, "Distraught and Out of Control", 1992 (45)
- Chaotic Past, Load, 1993 (EP, CD)
- Tomato Monkey, Blowrod, 1993 (CD Radio Sampler – 4 songs)
- Tomato Monkey, Blowrod, 1993 (CD)
- Tomato Monkey, Chow Call, 1994 (CD)
- Chaotic Past, Moodchanger, 1994 (EP, CD)
- Crab Daddy, Ancient Baby, 1994 (CD)
- Various Artists, The Wasted Years, 1995 (CD)
- Mission of Burma, Signals, Calls, and Marches (Ryko), 1997 (CD – 6 songs)
- Mission of Burma, Vs. (Ryko), 1997 (CD)
- Mission of Burma, The Horrible Truth About Burma (Ryko), 1997 (CD)
- Lyres, AHS 1005 (Matador), 1998 (CD – 13 songs)
- Lyres, On Fyre (Matador), 1998 (CD – 14 songs)
- Lyres, Lyres Lyres (Matador), 1998 (CD – 13 songs)
- Lyres, A Promise is A Promise (Matador), 1998 (CD – 17 songs)
- Chaotic Past, Yer-in, 1999 (CD)
- Chaotic Past, New Young Girl, 2000 (45, CD single)
- Martin Paul, Crooked Country, 2000 (EP, CD)
- Mission of Burma, A Gun to the Head: A Selection from the Ace of Hearts Era (Ryko), 2004 (CD comp.)
- Various Artists, 12 Classic 45s, 2006 (CD)
- Mission of Burma, Signals, Calls, and Marches (Matador), 2008 (CD+DVD – 10 songs)
- Mission of Burma, Vs. (Matador), 2008 (CD+DVD – 16 songs)
- Mission of Burma, The Horrible Truth About Burma (Matador), 2008 (CD+DVD – 14 songs)
- Heat from a Deadstar, CD 2 Songs including Messy Kid, Ad Astra, 2009
- Heat from a Deadstar, Seven Rays of the Sun, 2009 (CD – 13 songs)
- Birdsongs of the Mesozoic, Dawn of the Cycads (Cuneiform), 2009 (Double CD – 32 songs)
- Neats, 1981–1984 The Ace of Hearts Years, 2009 (CD – 22 songs)
- The Real Kids, Shake...Outta Control (vinyl EP – 4 songs)
- The Real Kids, Shake...Outta Control (CD – 12 songs)
- The Real Kids, Shake...Outta Control (vinyl LP - 10 songs, Licensed to Ugly Pop, Canada)
- The Real Kids, 28:18:39 (vinyl LP - 8 songs)
- Nervous Eaters, Hot Steel and Acid (CD - 14 songs)
- Lyres, Lucky 7 (Box Set, 7-45s Licensed to Munster Records(Distrolux)/Spain)
- William Hooker/Roger Miller/Lee Ranaldo, Monsoon
