= A Promise Is a Promise =

Studio album by Lyres
- Released: 1988
- Genre: Garage rock
- Label: Ace of Hearts
- Producer: Richard W. Harte

Lyres chronology
Live at Cantones! (1987)	A Promise Is a Promise (1988)	Live (1989)

A Promise Is a Promise is an album by the American band Lyres, released in 1988. A band timeline constructed by Pete Frame that was included in the gatefold claimed that the album was recorded by the 13th lineup of the Lyres. The cassette and CD versions of the album added seven songs.

The Lyres supported the album with a North American tour. The band broke up briefly after finishing the tour. A Promise Is a Promise was reissued by Matador Records in 1998.

== Production ==
The album was produced by Richard W. Harte. Some of the songs were recorded live during a European tour. Stiv Bators sang on "Here's a Heart". "Witch" is a cover of the Sonics song.

== Critical reception ==
Professional ratings
Review scores
Source	Rating
AllMusic	3/5 stars
All Music Guide to Rock	3/5 stars
MusicHound Rock: The Essential Album Guide	1.5/5 stars
Southport Visiter	3/10
Martin C. Strong	5/10

Trouser Press stated: "Dispensing with most of the dated stylization for about as modern a sound as a group with prominent Vox organ can get, the energy-spewing album drags in spots but blasts off in others." The Boston Globe concluded that the album "plays as a set of important throwaways, which, let's face it, is a rather central premise of disposable pop music ... [singer Jeff] Conolly's idea is to bash out the fury—or the occasional hope—and move on to the next slab-of-life dilemma."

The Washington Post determined that "the singer/keyboardist's passion is both the appeal and the point of bluesy stompers like 'Sicked and Tired'—and it's swaggeringly infectious." The Orlando Sentinel noted that, "with wheezing, cheesy organ riffs and grinding guitar chords, the Lyres from Boston embrace the style of '60s garage rock with an '80s twist." The Telegram & Gazette thought that the Lyres give "down-home garage melodies a punk soul."

AllMusic wrote that "despite the crazy quilt impression, it all hangs together surprisingly well as the performances are universally tight and energetic." MusicHound Rock: The Essential Album Guide panned the "lo-fi" live tracks.

== Track listing ==
No.	Title	Length
1.	"Here's a Heart"
2.	"On Fyre"
3.	"Every Man for Himself"
4.	"Feel Good"
5.	"I'll Try You Anyway"
6.	"Worried About Nothing"
7.	"Touch"
8.	"Running Through the Night"
9.	"She's Got Eyes That Tell Lies"
10.	"Jagged Time Lapse"
11.	"Knock My Socks Off"
12.	"Sick and Tired"
13.	"Trying Just to Please You"
14.	"Witch"
