= Nervous Eaters =

American punk/new wave band

The Nervous Eaters, one of Boston's first punk rock / rock and roll bands with Steve Cataldo on vocals and guitar, Robb Skeen on bass, and Jeff Wilkinson on drums. Forming in 1973 they had used the name some years earlier, but had not performed live under it. As the Rhythm Assholes, they had backed local rock legend Willie Alexander on his single "Kerouac" and in concert. After a name change, they made their debut at the hub of the city's alternative music scene, the Rathskeller—known as the Rat—in March 1976. Their first single, "Loretta", appeared later that year on the club's Rat label.

Early on, the band experienced problems holding on to a second guitarist, but Alan Hebditch, a childhood friend of Cataldo's, became a regular fixture in early 1978. Along with the Real Kids and DMZ, they were considered among the scene's "punkier" bands. Centered on Cataldo's "great rock & roll voice" and "jangly guitar", in the description of AllMusic's Joe Viglione, they were the "Rolling Stones of Boston...hard-rocking, riff-blasting, tongue-in-cheek". By 1978, they were one of the most popular acts in the city. Their second Rat single, the punk rock styled, "Just Head", appeared in 1979.

After the release of "Just Head", the band brought on a new second guitarist, Jonathan Paley. Ric Ocasek of scenemates the Cars produced a ten-song demo for the band that attracted major-label attention. Their self-titled debut album, produced by Harry Maslin, was released by Elektra Records in 1980. Trouser Press's Ira Robbins retrospectively panned it: "This Boston quartet had long been a local critics' choice; after this major-label record brought them a national hearing, it's hard to understand why. Nervous Eaters is an awfully tame set of J. Geils–like R&B and Hall and Oates–style soul." Belying the "R-rated and lovingly sexist" lyrics of "Loretta" and other album tracks such as "Get Stuffed" and "Girl Next Door", Viglione writes that the album's sound falls "somewhere between the Ronettes and the Four Seasons". Nonetheless, in his view, "The disc works despite being a slight misrepresentation of the artist." It met with little commercial success, and the Nervous Eaters disbanded in 1981.

The band briefly reunited in 1986, with Cataldo, Wilkinson, Hebditch, and Paley. They recorded a six-song EP, Hot Steel and Acid, for the French-based New Rose label; it was subsequently issued as well by Boston's Ace of Hearts Records.

In early June 2013, the band went on the road again, supporting the Stranglers at Brighton Music Hall, though at least one member has moved to California. In 2018, the Nervous Eaters and their old manager James Harold put out Live at the Rat 2 on DVD, and Rick Hearte, owner of Ace of Hearts, issued a CD re-release of Hot Steel and Acid with more songs added. 2021 The Nervous Eaters signed with WICKED COOL RECORDS. A new LP/CD is expected to follow in 2022. They will be on the road doing gigs in support of those LPs/ CDs through 2021–2022. Steve Berkowitz is executive producer of the project. The band now consists of drummer David Mclean, Brad Hallen on bass, and songwriter Steve Cataldo on lead guitar and lead vocals.

== Sources ==
- Strong, Martin Charles (2003). The Great Indie Discography, rev. ed. (Edinburgh: Canongate). ISBN 1-84195-335-0
- Thompson, Dave (2000). Alternative Rock (San Francisco: Miller Freeman). ISBN 0-87930-607-6
- Sedaka, Charlie (2013) WZBC Music presenter.
