= On Fyre =

Studio album by Lyres
- Released: 1984
- Studio: Normandy Sound
- Genre: Garage rock
- Length: 32:10
- Label: Ace of Hearts
- Producer: Richard W. Harte

Lyres chronology
On Fyre (1984)	Lyres Lyres (1985)

On Fyre is the first full-length studio album by American garage rock band Lyres. It was released in 1984 by the label Ace of Hearts and reissued in 1998 by Matador Records. It features "Help You Ann", which a commentator at KQED radio in San Francisco called "one of the greatest singles ever made."

The album includes covers of the Kinks' 1965 hit "Tired of Waiting for You" (the title is shortened to simply "Tired of Waiting"), the Kinks song "Love Me Till the Sun Shines", and the Pete Best Combo song "The Way I Feel About You". It also contains several quotes from songs from the 1960s: "Don't Give It Up Now" contains an excerpt of the guitar riff from "Lucifer Sam" by Pink Floyd, and "I'm Telling You Girl" contains an excerpt of the guitar riff from "You Really Got Me" by the Kinks.

Lyres' frontman, Jeff Connolly, said of the recording in the studio: "We did everything in one take ... everything live; even the tambourine was live. All that was overdubbed were a few background vocals and one tiny guitar solo."

== Critical reception ==
Professional ratings
Review scores
Source	Rating
AllMusic	4.5/5 stars
All Music Guide to Rock	4/5 stars
Robert Christgau	B
MusicHound Rock: The Essential Album Guide	3.5/5 stars
PopMatters	8/10
Martin C. Strong	7/10

The Washington Post wrote that "it's the passion of Connolly's organ-pumping, tambourine-bashing persona that makes The Lyres' variations on three chords sink deeper and ring truer than most rock acts, past or present." Musician magazine opined, "The Lyres are garage band classicists ... who know how to make the most of an 8-bar guitar break or organ rave-up." Record magazine wrote, "In light of today's virulent punk variant, hardcore, it may be difficult for some to appreciate the subtler charms of garage punk ... Still, there is undeniable power in tremolo and twang." The album ranked number 35 in The Village Voice annual Pazz & Jop poll for 1984.

AllMusic wrote that "while [Jeff] Conolly's Vox Continental organ keeps his 1960s obsessions up-front throughout, the rest of the band is capable of generating a hard-driving groove, and the performances capture what was exciting and soulful about 1960s punk without drowning in a sea of 'retro.'" PopMatters wrote that "the stop-and-start rhythms of 'Soapy' will prove irresistible to just about anyone with a pulse." Trouser Press called the album "simply the [garage-rock] genre's apotheosis, an articulate explosion of colorful organ playing, surging guitars and precisely inexact singing." On Fyre was included in the 2014 book Gimme Indie Rock: 500 Essential American Underground Rock Albums 1981–1996. Its author wrote: "The album is a seminal work of garage-rock/punk shot through with an artless ... sensibility and stuffed with rock-and-roll gold. Check out 'Help You Ann' for a sampling."

== "Help You Ann" ==
"Help You Ann" had been released as a single in 1983 and ranked number 24 on The Village Voice annual Pazz & Jop critics' poll of that year's best singles. The song was recorded by the Chesterfield Kings on a 1998 single and covered by Courtney Love on her live shows in the early 2000s. In 2005, Blender placed it at number 360 on their list of the 500 best songs from 1980 to 2005. In 2006, Boston magazine named "Help You Ann" number 13 on their list of the greatest Boston songs of all time.

AllMusic highlighted "the shimmer of a heavily tremolo-effected guitar line, driving the song with its quick pulse" and remarked that "'Help You Ann' is one of those perfect little moments in rock, one that went largely unnoticed outside the underground rock scene of the early '80s."

== Track listing ==
Side one

1. Don't Give It Up Now – 4:13
2. Help You Ann – 2:29
3. I Confess – 2:50
4. I'm Tellin' You Girl – 1:40
5. Love Me Till the Sun Shines – 3:56

Side two

1. Tired of Waiting – 3:05
2. Dolly – 4:17
3. Soapy – 3:43
4. The Way I Feel About You – 2:42
5. Not Like the Other One – 3:18

== Personnel ==
- Jeff Conolly – vocals, organ and tambourine
- Danny McCormack – guitar
- Paul Murphy – drums
- Rick Coraccio – bass, background vocals
