= Duck and Cover (compilation) =

Compilation album by Various Artists
- Released: 1990
- Length: 13 at 33:07
- Label: SST (263)

Professional ratings
Review scores
Source	Rating
Allmusic	3/5 stars

Duck and Cover is a 1990 compilation album, issued by SST Records, featuring cover songs by 13 punk and alternative rock bands.

== Track listing ==
1. Hüsker Dü - "Eight Miles High" (Gene Clark/David Crosby/Roger McGuinn) - 3:57
2. Meat Puppets - "Good Golly Miss Molly" (Robert "Bumps" Blackwell/John Marascalco) - 2:50
3. Black Flag - "Louie Louie" (Richard Berry) - 1:20
4. Volcano Suns - "Kick Out the Jams" (Michael Davis/Wayne Kramer/Fred "Sonic" Smith/
  Dennis Thompson/Rob Tyner) - 2:37
5. Saccharine Trust - "Six Pack" (Greg Ginn) - 2:13
6. Revolution 409 - "Crazy Horses" (Alan Osmond/Merrill Osmond/Wayne Osmond) - 2:27
7. Dinosaur Jr - "Just Like Heaven" (Simon Gallup/Robert Smith/Porl Thompson/Lol Tolhurst/
  Boris Williams) - 2:54
8. The Leaving Trains - "The Horse Song" (Rob Duprey/Iggy Pop) - 1:30
9. Stone by Stone With Chris D. - "Ghost" (Eric Martin) - 4:37
10. Minutemen - "Ain't Talkin' 'Bout Love" (Michael Anthony/David Lee Roth/Alex Van Halen/Eddie Van Halen) - 0:42
11. Descendents - "Wendy" (Brian Wilson) - 2:20
12. The Last - "Baby It's You" (Burt Bacharach/Mack David/Barney Williams) - 2:51
13. Trotsky Icepick - "The Light Pours Out of Me" (Howard Devoto/John McGeoch/Pete Shelley) - 2:50
