= Propeller Records (Boston) =

Propeller Records was an independent record label formed in Boston, MA, in 1981. The label, a collective, was formed by a number of Boston bands, including The Wild Stares, People in Stores, The Neats, CCCPTV and V;. Later members include Dangerous Birds, Art Yard, 21-645, Chinese Girlfriends, White Women, and Lori Green. The label was known for its anti-corporate, consumerist approach, labeling all releases with the phrase "Propeller Product" and the consumer-friendly admonition "pay no more than $2.00". The initial release, Propeller Product EP, featuring The Neats, People in Stores, CCCPTV and The Wild Stares, was a success in indie-label terms, achieving distribution through Rounder Records and selling over 5,000 copies. In 1982, Propeller released a compilation cassette tape consisting of two songs from each of the label-member bands, which was another indie-success and sold over 1,500 copies.

== Releases ==
- Propeller Product EP (The Neats/Six, People in Stores/Factory, CCCPTV/Mindless Funk, The Wild Stares/Moving Targets)
- People in Stores Single (Metaphor / White Funk)
- The Wild Stares Single (Never Seen Before / You)
- So! The V; EP (Sirens, The Need, 1926, Daved Hild)
- Propeller Product Compilation Cassette [Various Artists]
- Propeller Laughing at the Ground EP (21-645/Babble, Dangerous Birds/Emergency, V;/Schizted, Christmas/Close My Eyes)
- Dangerous Birds Single (Alpha Romeo / Smile On Your Face)
- The Wild Stares Single (All We Want/Over / The Moon is Down)

== See also ==
- List of record labels
