= The Obliterati =

Studio album by Mission of Burma
- Released: May 23, 2006
- Recorded: 2005
- Studio: Q Division Studios, Somerville, Massachusetts
- Genre: Post-punk, indie rock
- Length: 51:41
- Label: Matador
- Producer: Bob Weston

Mission of Burma chronology
Snapshot (2004)	The Obliterati (2006)	The Sound the Speed the Light (2009)

Professional ratings
Aggregate scores
Source	Rating
Metacritic	81/100
Review scores
Source	Rating
AllMusic	4.5/5 stars
Alternative Press	4/5
The Austin Chronicle	3.5/5 stars
The A.V. Club	A−
Ox-Fanzine	10/10
Pitchfork	8.3/10
Robert Christgau	(2-star Honorable Mention)
Rolling Stone	3.5/5 stars
Slant Magazine	3/5 stars
Stylus Magazine	B+

The Obliterati is the third studio album by American post-punk band Mission of Burma, released in May 2006 by record label Matador.

== Recording ==
In September 2005, Mission of Burma began recording their third studio album. The album was produced by Bob Weston.

== Release ==
The Obliterati was released on May 23, 2006 on Matador Records.

In February 2006, 500 fans signed up for a Mission of Burma singles club, which was intended to deliver, on a weekly basis, eight one-sided 12" vinyl singles and CD singles, with the vinyl singles coming out first and their CD counterparts arriving a couple of weeks afterward. Various manufacturing delays, however, forced Matador to release all eight CD singles simultaneously as a set, with the vinyl versions delivered to subscribers around the time The Obliterati arrived in stores. The "blank" sides of the vinyl singles, and the front cover and screenprinted sides of the CDs, feature etched artwork from artist Shepard Fairey (of "André the Giant Has a Posse" infamy).

== Reception ==
The album received a positive response from critics, and was named the 33rd best album of 2006 by Pitchfork.

== Track listing ==
1. "2wice" – 3:36
2. "Spider's Web" – 3:25
3. "Donna Sumeria" – 5:37
4. "Let Yourself Go" – 3:31
5. "1001 Pleasant Dreams" – 3:49
6. "Good, Not Great" – 2:07
7. "13" – 4:16
8. "Man in Decline" – 3:22
9. "Careening with Conviction" – 3:48
10. "Birthday" – 3:10
11. "The Mute Speaks Out" – 3:23
12. "Is This Where?" – 3:35
13. "Period" – 3:27
14. "Nancy Reagan's Head" – 4:35
