= Box set (disambiguation) =

A box set (or boxed set) is a set of items (for example, a compilation of books, musical recordings, films or television programs) traditionally packaged in a box, and offered for sale as a single unit.

Box set can also refer to:

== Music ==
- The Box Set (Cocteau Twins), a 1991 box set by Cocteau Twins
- The Box Set (Jimmy Lyons album), a 2003 album by Jimmy Lyons
- The Box Set (Kiss), a 2001 box set by Kiss
- The Misfits (album), a 1996 box set by Misfits
- Samhain (box set), a 2000 box set by Samhain
- The Box Set (The Twelfth Man album), a 2009 box set by The Twelfth Man
- Box Set (Wool album), a 1994 album by Wool

== Other uses ==
- Box set (theatre), a theatre set with a proscenium arch stage and three walls
- Full Boxset, an analog horror web series
