= The Real Kids =

American rock band

- Also known as: The Kids
- Origin: Boston, Massachusetts, United States
- Genres: Power pop; punk rock
- Years active: 1972–83; 1998–99; 2014
- Labels: Norton; Red Star; Star-Rhythm; New Rose; Sponge
- Past members: John Felice; Billy Borgioli; Alan Paulino; Howard Ferguson

The Real Kids were an American rock band from Boston, Massachusetts, United States, led by guitarist, singer & songwriter John Felice.

== History ==
Felice (born 1954) grew up in Natick, Massachusetts, as a neighbor and friend of Jonathan Richman, a fellow fan of the Velvet Underground. At 15 he joined Richman in the first line-up of the Modern Lovers in the early 1970s. He performed with the band intermittently from then until 1973, but because of his school commitments, he was not involved in the 1972 sessions which produced the first Modern Lovers album, though Felice is featured on a few live Modern Lovers recordings, on lead guitar and backing vocals. Commenting on Richman, Felice said, "Me and Jonathan, as close as we were, you know, I was like a punk, I was a wise-ass kid. I liked to do a lot of drugs, I liked to drink, and Jonathan was like this wide-eyed, no-drugs, ate nothing but health food..."

Felice then decided to start his own band and formed the Real Kids (originally named the Kids) in 1972, with Rick Coraccio (bass), Steve Davidson (guitar), and Norman Bloom (drums). They became a successful live band in the Boston area, playing "an aggressive brand of straight-ahead, no-bullshit rock which harkened back to Chuck Berry, had overtones of the British Invasion groups at their mod finest, yet pointed the way towards the Punk to come". In addition to Felice's own songs, they performed versions of classics by Eddie Cochran, Buddy Holly and others. The band did not record until 1977, when it comprised Felice, Billy Borgioli (guitar), Allen "Alpo" Paulino (bass), and Howie Ferguson (drums). Their first studio album, The Real Kids, was issued on the Red Star label in 1977; it was later reissued by Norton Records, who acquired the masters to the Red Star recordings and subsequently issued four more albums of early material.

While continuing to play occasionally with different line-ups of the Real Kids, Felice also worked for a time as a roadie for the Ramones. He also performed as part of the Taxi Boys in Boston. In 1982, the Real Kids released a second EP, Outta Place. They also toured Europe and released a live album, All Kindsa Jerks. They recorded a European release only new album, Hit You Hard, released on French label New Rose in 1983. Band members Allen "Alpo" Paulino and Billy Borgioli then left to form the Primitive Souls. In 1988, Felice formed a new band, John Felice and the Lowdowns, releasing an album, Nothing Pretty, on the Ace of Hearts label, later re-released on Norton Records. Miriam Linna, co-founder of the Norton label, worked at Red Star during the recording of the first album as their press agent, and went on to acquire the Red Star masters.

The Real Kids reunited on several other occasions. They performed regularly in 1998–99, including a New York City new year's gig. Bass player Allen "Alpo" Paulino died on February 6, 2006. The Real Kids reformed in 2014 and released a new CD, Shake Outta Control, on Ace of Hearts Records. This contained new recordings of some old classics like "Who Needs You" and "Common At Noon", along with a few new songs. The new album received rave reviews worldwide. It was also released on vinyl by The Ugly Pop Record label. Billy Borgioli died on June 27, 2015.

The five vinyl albums on the Norton label are the first self-titled album The Real Kids, Grown Up Wrong, Senseless, No Place Fast, and Better Be Good. Norton also issued vintage Real Kids recordings on 7" 45 RPM vinyl, and new recordings, and the albums are available on CD and on download.
