= Unsound (Mission of Burma album) =

Studio album by Mission of Burma
- Released: July 10, 2012
- Recorded: 2010–2012
- Genres: Post-punk; indie rock
- Length: 34:26
- Label: Fire

Mission of Burma chronology
The Sound the Speed the Light (2009)	Unsound (2012)

Unsound is the fifth and final studio album by American post-punk band Mission of Burma. Released in July 2012, it is their first and only record for Fire Records.

== Critical reception ==
Unsound has been well received by critics. At Metacritic, which assigns a normalized rating out of 100 to reviews from mainstream critics, the album has received an average score of 76, based on 27 reviews, indicating "generally favorable reviews".

Professional ratings
Aggregate scores
Source	Rating
Metacritic	76/100
Review scores
Source	Rating
The Guardian	4/5 stars
Paste	8.2/10
Pitchfork	7.7/10
Tiny Mix Tapes	3.5/5 marks
Consequence of Sound	B

== Track listing ==
1. "Dust Devil" – 1:58
2. "Semi-Pseudo-Sort-Of Plan" – 4:13
3. "Sectionals in Mourning" – 2:58
4. "This Is Hi-Fi" – 3:31
5. "Second Television" – 3:39
6. "Part the Sea" – 3:10
7. "Fell-->H2O" – 3:53
8. "Add in Unison" – 4:07
9. "7's" – 2:12
10. "What They Tell Me" – 2:35
11. "Opener" – 2:17
