= Academy Fight Song =

Single by Mission of Burma
- B-side: "Max Ernst"
- Released: June 1980
- Genre: Post-punk; punk rock
- Length: 3:05
- Label: Ace of Hearts
- Songwriter: Clint Conley
- Producer: Richard W. Harte

"Academy Fight Song" is a song written by Clint Conley and originally recorded by Mission of Burma. It is also known for having been performed and recorded by R.E.M.

The song has been described as one of Mission of Burma's "more melodic, shout-along tunes". Conley has declined to elaborate on the meaning of the lyrics, and according to author Michael Azerrad, was "typically evasive when asked if the song was angry. 'Yeah, pretty angry,' Conley said. 'It's just a big conceit. A metaphor. ... I find the whole notion of talking about lyrics very embarrassing.'"

"Academy Fight Song" was released as a single in June 1980 by Ace of Hearts Records with "Max Ernst" as the B-side. "Academy Fight Song" received significant airplay on Boston's WBCN (FM) and sold out its initial pressing of 7,500 copies within weeks.

== Reception ==
New York Rocker named "Academy Fight Song" one of the ten best singles of 1980. In 1981, The Michigan Daily wrote that it had "been called one of the best singles of 1980 by several new wave magazines and polls."

George Gimarc wrote in Post Punk Diary: 1980-1982 that Mission of Burma were "on their way to becoming a Boston legend with their single 'Academy Fight Song' and 'Max Ernst'." Robert Christgau has described "Academy Fight Song" as a "one-hook wonder" and "great".

Alex Ogg, writing in The Rough Guide to Rock, described "Academy Fight Song" as "pure sonic confrontation .... [I]t should be a primary source for all rock historians."

In 2020, Rolling Stone ranked the song at number 64 on its list of "The 100 Greatest Debut Singles of All Time", describing it as "a blast of guitar rage, full of punk menace, but without any posturing. ... The single was just a taste of Burma’s sound — ignored at the time, yet influential ever since."

== Other versions ==
Miracle Legion recorded "Academy Fight Song" for their 1987 album Surprise Surprise Surprise; the band often used it as an encore at their live performances.

R.E.M. released a recording of "Academy Fight Song" in 1989 on the annual Christmas single for their fan club members, as the B-side of "Good King Wenceslas", a 7" single in a limited edition of 4,500 copies. In 1990, Spin listed R.E.M.'s recording of the song as one of the 35 "worst cover songs of the last 35 years". However, a writer for Salon.com wrote that R.E.M.'s "clanging version" of "Academy Fight Song" was one of the cover versions that "make perfect sense" as a selection for the band.
