= That's When I Reach for My Revolver =

1981 song by Mission of Burma

Song by Mission of Burma

from the album Signals, Calls, and Marches
- Released: July 4, 1981
- Genre: Post-punk; alternative rock
- Length: 3:53
- Label: Ace of Hearts
- Songwriter: Clint Conley
- Producer: Richard W. Harte

"That's When I Reach for My Revolver" is a song by Mission of Burma that was written and sung by band member Clint Conley. It appears on their 1981 EP Signals, Calls and Marches. Moby covered the song in 1996 and released it as a single, reaching number fifty on the UK Singles Chart. Prior to this, Catherine Wheel also covered the song as a b-side to their single 30 Century Man in 1992.

The title is a reference to the often-mistranslated quotation: "When I hear the word 'culture', that's when I reach for my revolver"—the actual quote from Hanns Johst is "Wenn ich Kultur höre ... entsichere ich meinen Browning!" This translates as: "Whenever I hear [the word] 'culture'... I remove the safety from my Browning!"

== Moby version ==
"That's When I Reach for My Revolver"

Single by Moby

from the album Animal Rights
- B-side: "Lovesick"; "Displaced"; "Sway"; "Every One of My Problems"; "God Moving over the Face of the Waters"; "Dark"
- Released: August 26, 1996
- Recorded: 1996
- Length: 3:55
- Label: Mute; Elektra
- Songwriter: Clint Conley
- Producer: Moby

Moby singles chronology
"Bring Back My Happiness" (1995)	"That's When I Reach for My Revolver" (1996)	"Come On Baby" (1996)

Music video
- "Moby - That's When I Reach For My Revolver" on YouTube

American musician Moby covered the song in 1996 and released it as the first single from his fourth studio album, Animal Rights (1996). It was released on August 26, 1996 by Mute and Elektra, reaching number 50 on the UK Singles Chart.

The original version of "That's When I Reach for My Revolver" had substantially different lyrics, among which is "Tonight the sky is empty/But that is nothing new/Its dead eyes look upon us/And they tell me we're nothing but slaves." Moby provided an alternate vocal track to permit airplay on MTV; with subdued lyrics, the video version was retitled as "That's When I Realize It's Over".

=== Critical reception ===
Mark Luffman from Melody Maker commented, "This is a joke, right? Moby makes a record that sounds like Jimmy Pursey singing with The Alarm? It's not a joke? Oh dear, oh dear."

=== Track listing ===
- CD single (CDMUTE184)
1. "That's When I Reach for My Revolver" (single version) – 3:55
2. "Lovesick" – 1:05
3. "Displaced" – 1:25
4. "Sway" – 6:51
- CD single (LCDMUTE184)
1. "That's When I Reach for My Revolver" (The Rollo & Sister Bliss Vocal Mix) – 10:20
2. "Every One of My Problems" – 3:14
3. "God Moving over the Face of the Waters" (Heat Mix) – 5:45
4. "Dark" – 4:21
- 12-inch single (12MUTE184)
1. "That's When I Reach for My Revolver" (The Rollo & Sister Bliss Vocal Mix) – 10:20
2. "That's When I Reach for My Revolver" (The Rollo & Sister Bliss Instrumental Mix) – 10:10
- 12-inch single (0-63953)
1. "That's When I Reach for My Revolver" (Moby's Mix) – 6:52
2. "That's When I Reach for My Revolver" (Psychotic Ve-Gun Mix Edit – Vocal Dub) – 6:58
3. "That's When I Reach for My Revolver" (Moby's Mix 1 Edit) – 3:44
4. "That's When I Reach for My Revolver" (The Rollo & Sister Bliss Vocal Mix) – 10:20

=== Charts ===
Chart (1996)	Peak position
Belgium (Ultratip Bubbling Under Flanders)	14
Finland (Suomen virallinen lista)	14
Scottish Singles Sales (Official Charts)	43
UK Singles (Official Charts)	50
UK Dance (Official Charts)	30
