= Mission of Burma =

American post-punk band

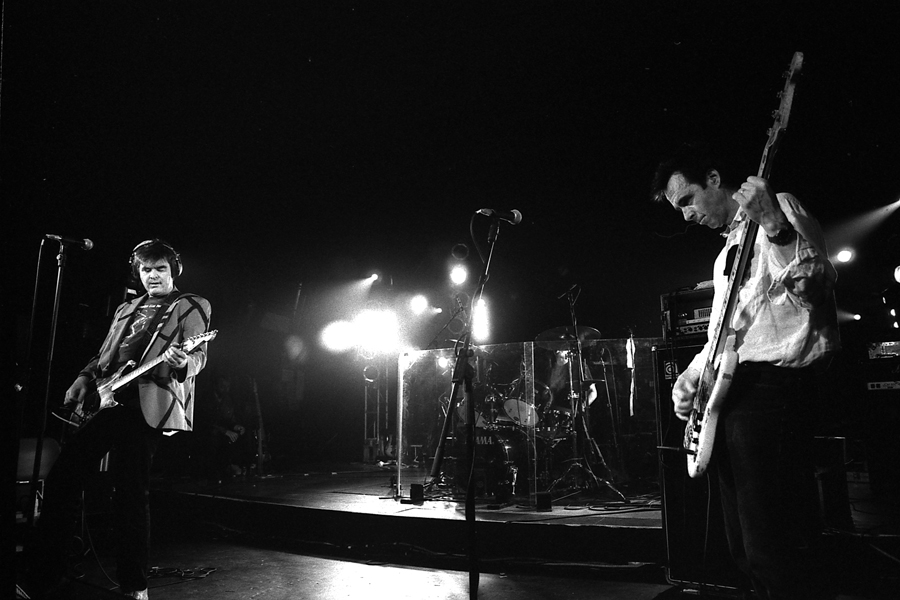
- Mission of Burma in 2004.

Background information
- Origin: Boston, Massachusetts, United States
- Genres: Post-punk, indie rock
- Years active: 1979–1983; 2002–2020
- Labels: Matador, Rykodisc, Ace of Hearts, Taang!, Fire
- Past members: Roger Miller; Clint Conley; Peter Prescott; Martin Swope; Bob Weston
- Website: www.missionofburma.com

Mission of Burma was an American post-punk band from Boston, Massachusetts. The group formed in 1979 with Roger Miller on guitar, Clint Conley on bass, Peter Prescott on drums, and Martin Swope contributing audiotape manipulation and acting as the band’s sound engineer. In this initial lineup, Miller, Conley, and Prescott all shared singing and songwriting duties.

In their early years the band's recordings were all released on the small Boston-based record label Ace of Hearts. Despite their initial success in the growing independent music circuit, Mission of Burma disbanded in 1983 due to Miller's development of tinnitus caused by the loud volume of the band's live performances. In its original lineup, the band released only two singles, an EP, and one LP, titled Vs.

Mission of Burma reformed in 2002, with Bob Weston replacing Swope. The band released four more albums—ONoffON, The Obliterati, The Sound the Speed the Light, and Unsound—before it was revealed in June 2020 that they had amicably disbanded.

== History ==
=== Formation and early history ===
Mission of Burma's history began with a short-lived Boston rock group called Moving Parts. The band included Roger Miller, who had moved to Boston from Ann Arbor, Michigan, and Clint Conley, who came from Darien, Connecticut. When Moving Parts broke up amicably in December 1978, Miller and Conley began practicing. Auditioning new drummers was accomplished, as Michael Azzerad puts it, "by playing 'out' music, such as Sun Ra and James Brown, until the applicant left." They eventually recruited ex-Molls drummer Peter Prescott, who had admired the music of Moving Parts.

They took their name from a "Mission of Burma" plaque Conley saw on a New York City diplomatic building; he thought the phrase had a "sort of murky and disturbing" quality. Mission of Burma made their debut on April 1, 1979 as a trio, performing at The Modern Theater. Later that month Miller wrote a song, "Nu Disco", that he felt would be improved by a tape loop. Miller then contacted Martin Swope, with whom he had earlier written some John Cage and Karlheinz Stockhausen-inspired pieces for piano and tape. Swope was immediately enlisted as the group's live audio engineer and occasional tape-effects artist. His latter role grew gradually, until by 1981 he was adding tape work to most of the group's songs, and was regarded as an integral part of the group, appearing in group photographs and listed as a full member.

From the start, Mission of Burma received support from local music magazine Boston Rock, which printed a lengthy interview with the band before they released their first record, and MIT community radio station WMBR. The station played Conley's "Peking Spring" repeatedly, and it became the station's most-played song of 1979. Mission of Burma wanted to release the song as a single, but by the time they had found a label, they felt the song had run its course.

=== Signals and Vs. ===
By 1981, the band signed a record deal with the Boston-based record label Ace of Hearts. Their debut single was Conley's "Academy Fight Song", with Miller's "Max Ernst" (titled after the dada artist) as the B-side. Rick Harte's layered production was far more refined than the band's ragged live performances, and the band initially objected to the single. However, the first pressing of the single sold out quickly, and the band thereafter trusted Harte's judgment.

Their debut release, the EP Signals, Calls, and Marches, was released in 1981. By the end of that year, the EP had sold out its initial pressing of 10,000 copies.

In 1982, Mission of Burma released their first full-length album, Vs.. The album has since seen wide praise; one review notes "very few American bands from the 1980s released an album as ambitious or as powerful as Vs., and it still sounds like a classic".

In February 1982, the band recorded a two-song single in collaboration with vocalist Dan Ireton under the name Dredd Foole and the Din. Several members played instruments that they did not play in Mission of Burma, with Miller on organ, Conley handling lead guitar, and Swope joining more directly in the instrumentation on prepared bass. The collaboration was further developed with a series of live shows, which continued nearly a year beyond Mission of Burma's breakup in 1983. This was Mission of Burma's only collaboration during their initial period of activity (1979–1983).

=== Breakup and aftermath ===
In 1983, after the release of Vs., the group disbanded due to Miller's worsening tinnitus, attributed in large part to their notoriously loud live performances—during their farewell tour, Miller took to augmenting his usual small foam earplugs with rifle-range earmuffs onstage. A live compilation, The Horrible Truth About Burma, was assembled of recordings from the farewell tour and released on Ace of Hearts in 1985. In 1988, Rykodisc released a compilation album, Mission of Burma, the first compact disc to exceed 80 minutes of playing time.

Miller and Swope then turned their attention to their side project, the quieter Birdsongs of the Mesozoic (co-founded with their old friend Erik Lindgren, who had played with Miller and Conley in Moving Parts), which they both left in the 1990s, Miller to produce several solo efforts and film scores, and Swope to semi-reclusion in Hawaii. Prescott remained active in the Boston music scene, forming Volcano Suns and later Kustomized and The Peer Group. He is currently playing in Minibeast. Other than producing Yo La Tengo's debut record, Conley dropped out of music, working as a producer for Boston television station WCVB's newsmagazine Chronicle until he formed the band Consonant in 2001.

=== Reunion ===
While disbanded, Mission of Burma garnered a larger fanbase. In the 1980s and 90s, Taang! Records and Rykodisc kept the band's music in print via reissues of the Ace of Hearts catalog as well as unreleased recordings. Mission of Burma was also one of the 13 groups featured in Michael Azerrad's book Our Band Could Be Your Life: Scenes from the American Indie Underground, 1981–1991, marking them as an iconic group in the American indie rock canon.

In 2002, Mission of Burma reunited but without Swope as he declined to join. Conley, Miller and Prescott instead played reunion shows with Bob Weston of Shellac (and formerly Prescott's Volcano Suns bandmate) replacing Swope at the mixing board and tape manipulation. In an interview Miller related that "when we approached Bob Weston to fill Martin's position, we told him he could use current digital technology which accomplishes Martin's antics in an easier fashion. However, Bob opted for maintaining the original integrity, and uses a tape deck." Weston later began using a digital looping box from Electro-Harmonix in 2007 during live performances, but still continued to use actual tape loops in the studio. Weston would also regularly join the band onstage during encores, playing bass while Conley played second guitar.

The band initially planned on playing just two reunion gigs, one in Boston and another in New York. When tickets sold out very quickly and concert dates expanded to two nights in New York and three in Boston, Mission of Burma decided to re-form more permanently to tour and record new material.

A new album, ONoffON, was produced in 2004 by Weston with Rick Harte and the band, and released by Matador Records in May. The album finished 90th in the Village Voice Pazz & Jop critic's poll. They also released Snapshot, a live recording of the reunited lineup, through online digital channels. In September 2005, the band returned to the studio with Weston for an album tentatively titled (among other names) Aluminum Washcloth and rechristened The Obliterati. Released in May 2006, again on Matador, it ranked #33 of best records of 2006 by Pitchfork Media and placed 50th in the Pazz & Jop poll.

In 2006, a documentary about the band was released entitled Not a Photograph: The Mission of Burma Story. In March 2008, Matador re-released remastered versions of Signals, Calls, and Marches, Vs., and The Horrible Truth About Burma from the band's original era. In an interview with the L.A. Record later that year, Prescott explained that the sheer physical exertion involved in performing Mission of Burma songs meant that the band could only play together for a "couple more years at most."

In 2009 the band recorded 14 tracks for their fourth full-length studio album, The Sound The Speed The Light. Matador released a two non-album songs on a 7″ single in August and the full album in October.

In 2012 Mission of Burma parted ways with Matador and recorded their fifth full-length album, Unsound, for Fire Records. The album saw release in July 2012, preceded by the single "Dust Devil".

In a 2019 Facebook post, it was revealed that the band has no plans to make further albums. In June 2020, Boston NPR affiliate WBUR-FM reported that the band had amicably disbanded, with Conley, Miller and Prescott remaining "good friends." Prior to the 2019 announcement, their last live performance took place in 2016 in Berlin.

The band performed a one-off reunion at The Middle East Downstairs in Cambridge, MA on March 12, 2026 as part of a benefit show for Jeff Conolly of the Lyres. They reunited yet again for another benefit show at Brighton Music Hall on August 14, 2026.

== Artistry ==
=== Musical style and influences ===
Mission of Burma's music has been characterized as "combining avant-garde experimentation with post-punk dynamics." Describing their key influences and musical approach, drummer Peter Prescott has said, "you can get the Burma mentality by crossing John Coltrane with the Ramones. It's the idea of experimentation combined with primal fury, I guess."

According to John Dougan of AllMusic: "Burma's music is vintage early-'80s post-punk: jittery rhythms, odd shifts in time, declamatory vocals, an aural assault similarly employed by bands such as Gang of Four, Mekons, and Pere Ubu." Dougan also noted that "[w]hat Burma added was a sonic texture through the use of extreme volume. Roger Miller's guitar enveloped the band in thick, distorted, cascading chords, erupting into squealing solos and (intentional) squalls of feedback."

Throughout Mission of Burma’s career, Roger Miller and Clint Conley handled most of the singing and songwriting, with Peter Prescott contributing a few songs per record as well. Music critic Franklin Bruno described Conley as a "hook machine" while Miller's songs tended to be more unorthodox, both lyrically and structurally.

=== Tape manipulation ===
Prescott explained Swope's methods in a 1997 interview: "What Martin did ... was tape something that was going on live, manipulate it, and send it back in (via the soundboard) as a sort of new instrument. You couldn't predict exactly how it would sound, and that got to be the really fun thing I think we all liked. We wanted to play this hammer-down drony noise stuff, but we also wanted another sound in there." Swope's tapework ranged from subtle and nearly subaural (such as the quiet shifting feedback sounds in Conley's "That's When I Reach For My Revolver"), to prominent and even jarring (such as the high-pitched two-note squeal in Miller's "Red"). Journalist Michael Azerrad later wrote: "A lot of people never knew about Swope's contribution and were mystified by how the musicians onstage could wring such amazing phantom sounds from their instruments." Though his contribution is widely considered an integral part of Burma's sound, Swope very rarely appeared onstage, only occasionally appearing to play second guitar during encores.

=== Live performances ===
Mission of Burma’s early gigs were notorious for being hit-or-miss and represented far more rough-edged sound than the band’s studio recordings. This is reflected by the title of the band’s early live album, The Horrible Truth About Burma—an in-joke about their inconsistency as an onstage act. Boston music critic Tristam Lozaw described Mission of Burma live from the band’s early days: "When they were good, they were very very good, but when they were bad they were horrid ... But that was the nature of the beast ... Because they took chances, you never knew whether you were going to get one of the most spectacular experiences of your life or if it was going to be a ball of incomprehensible noise." While the band's improvisational side and the unpredictable chaos of Swope's tape work contributed to this inconsistency, the two main factors were (as Lozaw implies) the live sound and the pacing and timing of their sets. When faced with a venue where the sound system or room acoustics weren't up to the task of conveying clarity along with the band's trademark volume, Swope always refused to compromise, and opted for volume. The band's set lists were composed by committee a few minutes before going on stage, and could range from well-constructed to seemingly picked at random, and there was a general reluctance to repeat any song placement or sequence that had worked in the past.

== Legacy ==
Numerous bands and artists have cited Burma as an influence, including Foo Fighters, the Replacements, Thurston Moore, Hüsker Dü bassist Greg Norton, Buffalo Tom, Drive Like Jehu, Unwound, Metz, and the Dirtbombs.

Artists such as Grand Theft Audio, Scott Sorry, Catherine Wheel, Graham Coxon, Pegboy, Moby and Down by Law have all covered Conley's "That's When I Reach for My Revolver,” while both R.E.M. and Miracle Legion have performed cover versions of Mission of Burma’s first single, "Academy Fight Song"—the former on both their Green tour and a 1989 fan club single, and the latter on their debut album, Surprise Surprise Surprise.

The indie rock band Versus also took their name from the Mission of Burma album Vs.

In 2009 the Boston City Council declared October 4th to be "Mission of Burma Day" in honor of the band's work in a ceremony held across the river in Cambridge at MIT.

== Discography ==
=== Studio albums ===
- Vs. (1982)
- ONoffON (2004)
- The Obliterati (2006)
- The Sound the Speed the Light (2009)
- Unsound (2012)
