= Clint Conley =

American musician and journalist

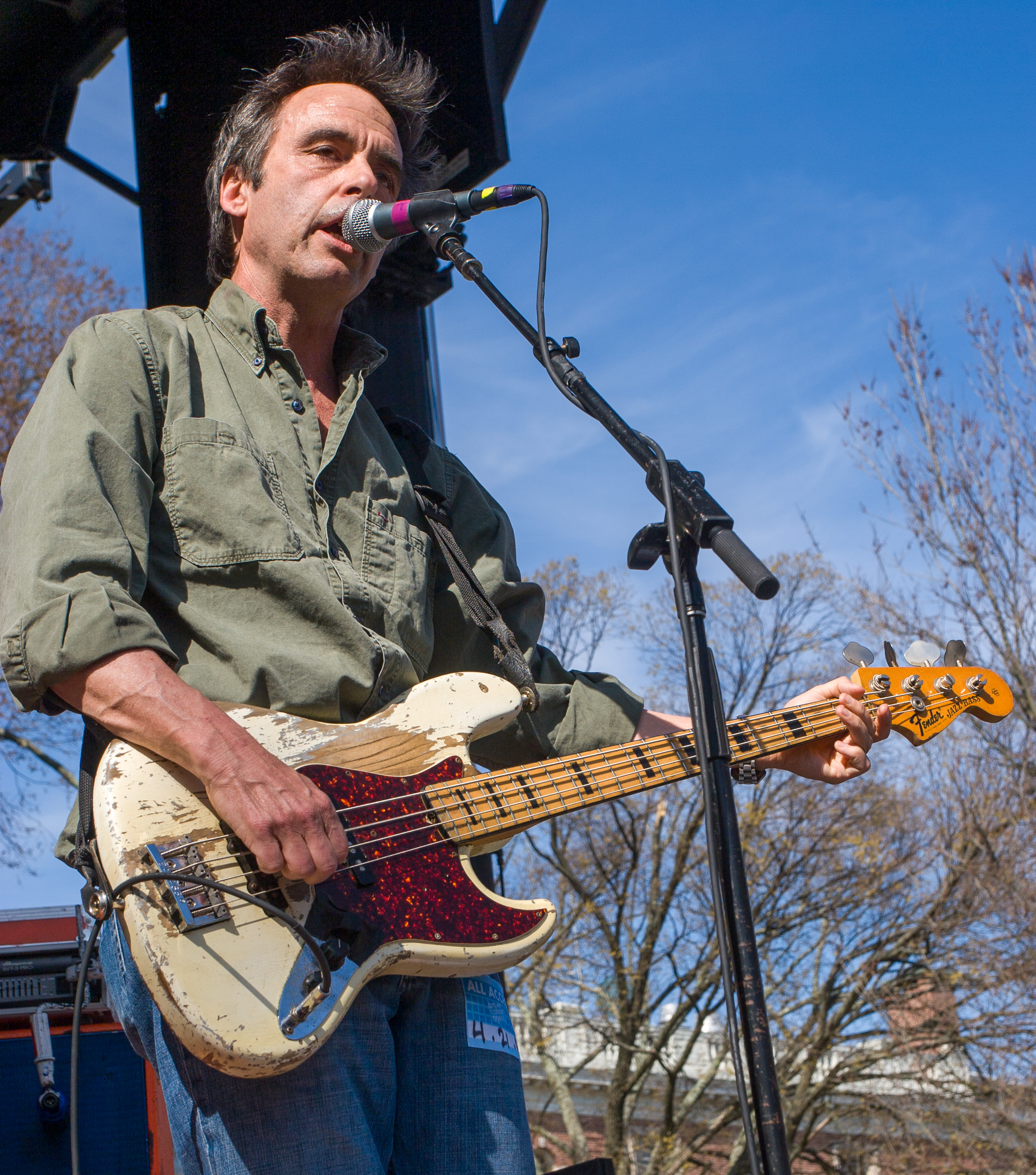

Background information
- Born: Boston, Massachusetts, U.S.
- Genres: Post-punk, Alternative Rock
- Instruments: Bass guitar, Guitar, Vocals
- Label: Ace of Hearts Records (US)

Clinton J. Conley is an American post-punk musician and journalist from Boston, Massachusetts, best known as a co-founder, bassist, and vocalist of Mission of Burma.

== Early life and education ==
Conley was born in Boston, Massachusetts, and graduated from the University of Rochester in 1977. He spent his high school years in Darien, Connecticut, befriending Jeff Conolly, later of The Lyres. The two formed a band for a school talent show, performing songs as varied as Frank Zappa's "Peaches En Regalia" and Otis Redding's "Can't Turn You Loose."

== Career ==
Mission of Burma was active from 1979 to 1983. They found only limited success when signed (like Conolly's Lyres) to Ace of Hearts Records, but they have been re-assessed as one of the more influential American post-punk groups of their era. The band was cited as an influence for Pixies, Nirvana, and Pearl Jam. When the group broke up in 1983, Conley dropped out of music almost entirely for over a decade, earning a master's degree in broadcast journalism and going to work as a producer for WCVB-TV's news magazine program, Chronicle. He did, however, produce Yo La Tengo's 1986 debut album, Ride the Tiger.

With Mission of Burma, Conley played bass guitar and occasional guitar, and wrote and sang some of the group's best-known songs, such as "That's When I Reach For My Revolver" and "Academy Fight Song"—songs that often had an anthemic sing-along quality. Conley's bass work often featured double stops and chords.

In 2001, Conley formed a new group, Consonant, as lead vocalist and now playing primarily guitar. They released two albums. Conley said that playing in a band again helped him be more receptive to the idea of returning to his old one.

In 2002, Conley reunited with Roger Miller and Peter Prescott, and with Bob Weston of Shellac replacing original member Martin Swope, they began performing and recording as Mission of Burma. They released four albums before announcing they had disbanded again in 2020.
