= Bob Weston =

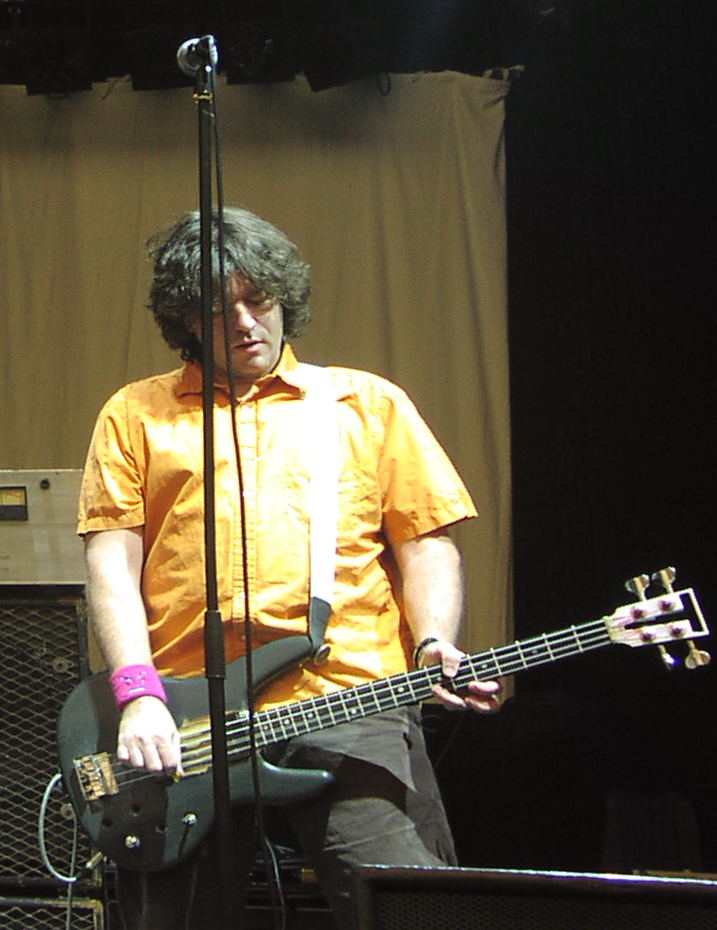
- Bob Weston live with Shellac (ATP festival 2007)

Background information
- Born: 1965 (age 60–61); Waltham, Massachusetts, U.S.
- Genres: Indie rock; post-punk; post-hardcore
- Occupations: Musician, producer, recording engineer, record mastering engineer
- Instruments: Bass guitar, vocals, trumpet
- Years active: 1987–present
- Formerly of: Shellac, Volcano Suns, Mission of Burma

Bob Weston (born 1965) is an American musician, producer, recording engineer, and record mastering engineer. Critic Jason Ankeny declares that "Weston's name and fingerprints are all over the American underground rock of the post-punk era, producing and engineering dates for a seemingly endless number of bands." As a performer, Weston is best known as the bass guitarist in the groups Volcano Suns and Shellac.

== Biography ==
Weston was born and raised in Waltham, Massachusetts. During the summers of 1985 and 1987, he marched as a bugler with the renowned Garfield Cadets Drum and Bugle Corps from Garfield, New Jersey. The corps won the Drum Corps International World Championships in both those years. Weston still plays trumpet, as on the albums The Sea and the Bells by Rachel's (1996) and Things We Lost in the Fire by Low (2001).

In 1988, he earned a B.S. in electrical engineering from the University of Lowell in Lowell, Massachusetts. While working at the university's campus radio station, WJUL, he began mixing live performances of Boston-area bands such as Pixies and the Blake Babies.

In 1987 Weston joined the Volcano Suns, playing bass guitar. The group was led by Peter Prescott, (previously the drummer for Mission of Burma, who had broken up in 1983).

Weston joined Steve Albini and Todd Trainer in Shellac in 1991. Under Albini, Weston honed his studio production skills and has gone on to record and mix material for bands including Sebadoh, June of 44, Polvo, the Coctails, Archers of Loaf, Chavez, Rachel's, Ken Vandermark, 33.3, Six Finger Satellite, and Rodan. Weston was also Albini's assistant engineer on Nirvana's In Utero album. According to a 2006 interview, being a musician has helped shape Weston's work recording, mixing and mastering: "It’s obvious to me that the best recording engineers have played in bands. You understand the dynamic better and can almost become an unofficial band member during the session. And it’s pretty easy to tell on what sort of session your musical opinion is wanted or not." However, Weston's recording and mixing work is not limited to music: he occasionally freelances for National Public Radio, often working on comedy quiz show Wait, Wait, Don't Tell Me, which is headquartered in Chicago.

In 2002, Weston joined the reunited Mission of Burma, taking the place of Martin Swope as tape manipulator and live engineer for the band. He appears on and recorded the albums ONoffON, The Obliterati, The Sound The Speed The Light, and Unsound.

In early 2007, Weston opened Chicago Mastering Service with Jason Ward on Chicago's west side.

== Equipment ==
- A detailed gear diagram of Bob Weston's Shellac bass rig from 2000 is well-documented. According to the diagram, Weston plays a Travis Bean bass through a Traynor TS50B (used as a preamp only), a Crown Power Base 2 power amplifier, and two homemade cabinets equipped with Electro-Voice Pro Line 15L speakers.
