= Peter Prescott (musician) =

American drummer

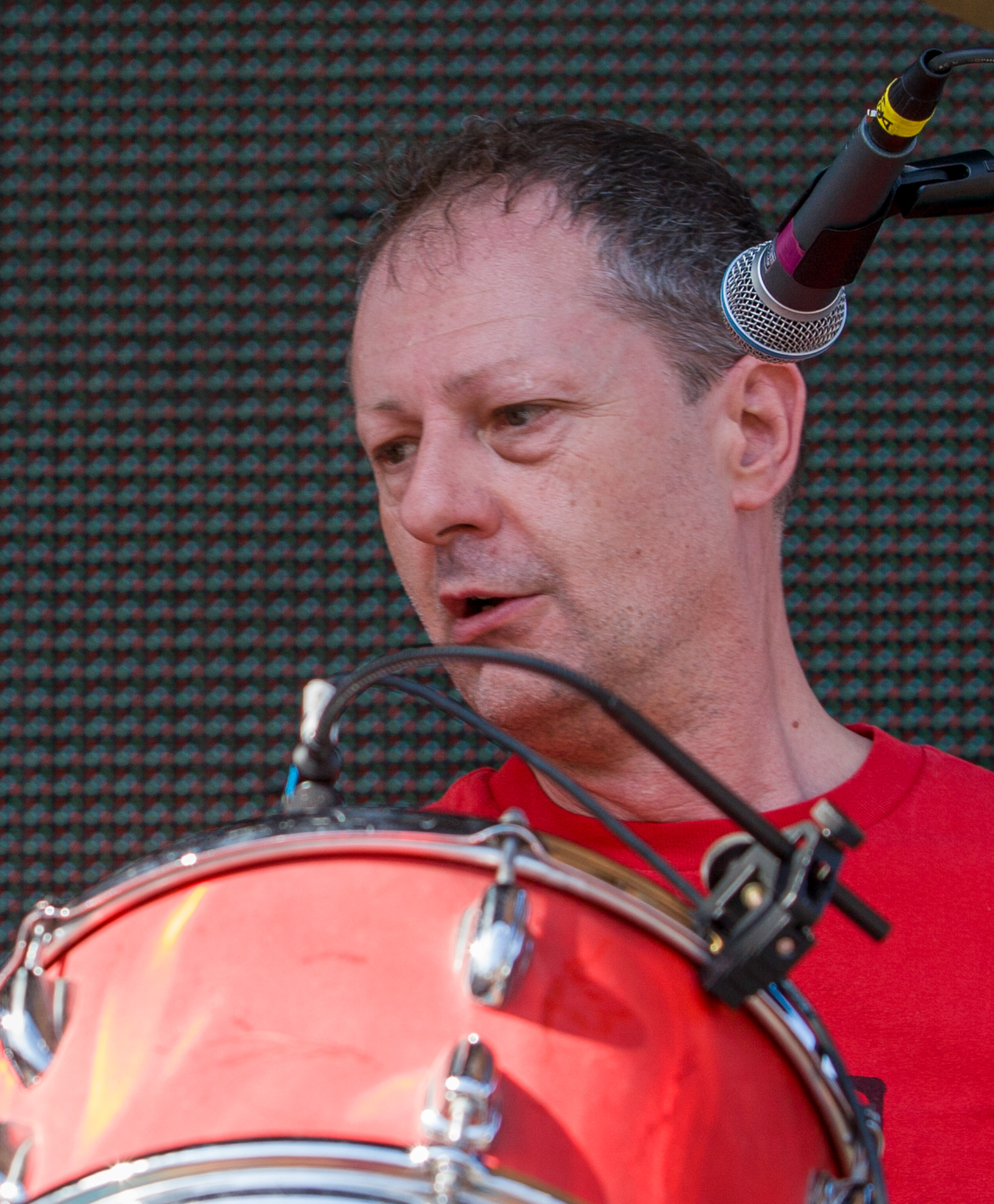
With Mission of Burma in 2007

Peter Glen Prescott is a musician from Boston, Massachusetts.

He is best known as the drummer for Mission of Burma. After Burma disbanded in 1983, Prescott remained active in the Boston music scene, forming Volcano Suns and later Kustomized, Peer Group, and Minibeast. Since Burma's reformation, beginning with 2004's ONoffON, Prescott has resumed his original duties alongside bandmates Roger Miller and Clint Conley.
