= Roger Miller (rock musician) =

American singer-songwriter and instrumentalist

Roger Clark Miller

Background information
- Born: February 24, 1952 (age 74); Ann Arbor, Michigan, United States
- Genres: Post-punk; indie rock; avant-garde; chamber music; psychedelic rock
- Years active: 1967–present
- Labels: Fire; Ace of Hearts; Matador; New Alliance; SST; Cuneiform Records; World in Sound; Feeding Tube; Atavistic
- Website: rogerclarkmiller.com

Roger Clark Miller (born February 24, 1952) is an American singer, songwriter and multi-instrumentalist best known for co-founding Mission of Burma and performing in Alloy Orchestra/The Anvil Orchestra.

His main instruments are guitar and piano. Guitar Player magazine describes Miller's guitar playing as balancing rock energy with cerebral experimentation. He also plays cornet, bass guitar and percussion.

== Biography ==
=== Early life ===
Miller was born in Ann Arbor, Michigan, on February 24, 1952. His father was a professor of ichthyology, which prompted frequent travel to the Western United States during summers—in search of fish in isolated springs in the desert for comparison with the fossil record—in which he brought his son along. These expeditions informed his later artistic outlook, which incorporates themes of nature, harsh environments, the passage of time, and self-reliance.

Miller began piano lessons at the age of 6. In middle school, he studied the french horn in band class, and at age 13, he picked up the guitar.

=== Sproton Layer (1960s) ===
Inspired by Jimi Hendrix and Detroit-area bands like the Stooges, the SRC, and the MC5, Miller formed several garage bands in his teens, starting with the Sky High Purple Band in 1967. With brothers Benjamin (Ben) Miller and Laurence B. (Larry) Miller, he formed Sproton Layer in the fall of 1969; Miller played bass guitar and was the primary singer and songwriter. They recorded a demo for an album in 1970; these recordings were collected and released in 1992 and again in 2011 as With Magnetic Fields Disrupted. Another set of recordings, from 1969 and 1971, was released in 2026 titled Press Your Hand and the Whole Room Fluctuates. The Miller brothers have an occasional ongoing collaboration called M3.

Attending CalArts in 1976, majoring in composition, Miller also studied piano and French Horn, and studied music by 20th-century experimental composers like John Cage and Karlheinz Stockhausen. He dropped out of college in favor of punk rock.

=== First Mission of Burma line-up and break-up (1979–1983) ===
Relocating to Boston, Massachusetts, Miller was a member of the short-lived Moving Parts before co-founding Mission of Burma in 1979.

Mission of Burma disbanded in 1983 due in large part to Miller's worsening tinnitus, attributed in large part to their notoriously loud live performances. In subsequent years, Mission of Burma's small body of recordings grew to be regarded as important and influential.

During the Burma years, Miller worked briefly as a freelance piano tuner.

=== Other bands and solo efforts (1983–present) ===
After Burma broke up, Miller turned his attention to playing piano with the more experimental, instrumental group Birdsongs of the Mesozoic, which he left in 1987. From 1983 to 1989 he was active in Maximum Electric Piano.

Afterward, Miller had several collaborations, solo efforts, and film scores; many of these post-Burma albums were released by SST Records:

- Alloy Orchestra, a trio with Miller on keyboards that composed new scores for silent films. The group's name refers to the many metal objects (hubcaps, springs and pots) used by percussionists Ken Winokur and Terry Donahue. This group morphed into The Anvil Orchestra in 2020 and remains active with Miller, and percussionist Terry Donahue.
- Solo Electric Guitar Ensemble, a multiple-guitar/live loops ensemble. Performances began in the fall of 2020.
- M2, an ongoing musical collaboration with Benjamin Miller with Miller on prepared piano.
- Exquisite Corpse, an instrumental group with Miller on guitar, piano, and sampler; violinist; percussionist; and a shawm/sackbutt player.
- Binary System, an instrumental, piano/drums duo with percussionist Larry Dersch.
- Hooker/Miller/Ranaldo, a free improvisation group composed of William Hooker (percussion), Lee Ranaldo (guitar), and Miller (bass).
- M3, a musical collaboration with Benjamin Miller and Laurence Miller.
- Maximum Electric Piano (solo prepared piano with loops).
- No Man (a rock-oriented project with Russell Smith on bass and Ken Winokur or Malcolm Travis on drums).
- Elemental Guitar (solo prepared guitar with loops).
- Trinary System (rock trio more psychedelic and less punk than Mission of Burma).
- Unplugged from a Band (solo guitar/voice/some loops)

=== Reformation of Mission of Burma (2002–2020) ===
Mission of Burma reunited in 2002 with Bob Weston replacing Swope. On stage, Miller had his Marshall amplifier at the edge of the stage on his right, with the speakers facing away from him (as seen in the reunion footage in the M0B documentary Not a Photograph). The band released four albums since reforming; the latest is Unsound, July 2012, on Fire Records. The band stopped performing in 2017.

Many bands have cited Burma as an inspiration, including Nirvana, Pearl Jam, Foo Fighters, Superchunk, Jawbox, The Grifters, R.E.M., Miracle Legion (the last two have even covered "Academy Fight Song": the former on their Green tour and the latter on their debut), Sonic Youth, Drive Like Jehu, Throwing Muses, Yo La Tengo, Fugazi, Pixies, Sugar, Guided by Voices, Shellac, Catherine Wheel, Graham Coxon, Pegboy, Moby and Down by Law - the last five of which have covered Conley's "That's When I Reach for My Revolver". In 2009 the city of Boston declared October 4 to be "Mission of Burma Day" in honor of the band's work in a ceremony held at the MIT East Campus Courtyard.

Currently (2026) he tours solo electric guitar, vocals, loops, in support of his Fall 2026 LP "The Green Man" on Don Giovanni Records.

=== Soundtrack work ===
Miller has created soundtrack scores for animation, documentaries (Big Ideas for a Small Planet, 2007), and commercials (1992: Three 7-Eleven Slurpee animations where the heads exploded). Four of the films he has scored have premiered at the Sundance Film Festival, which included 500 Years (2016) and Granito: How to Nail a Dictator (2011).

=== Conceptual art ===
Miller's work, “Transmuting the Prosaic”, was shown at the Brattleboro Museum and Art Center in Brattleboro, VT, March 15 – October 15, 2020. Five of Miller’s Modified Vinyl works (with turn-tables and listening stations) and his film, “The Davis Square Symphony”. The first edition of “Transmuting the Prosaic” was sold to the New England Art Museum in Burlington, VT.

"Transmuting the Prosiac" was shown again at 3S Artspace, Portsmouth, NH, from December 2, 2022 - January 22, 2023, featuring Modified Vinyl and The Davis Square Symphony. During opening night, Miller also performed excerpts from his new LP, Eight Dream Interpretations for Solo Electric Guitar Ensemble.

=== Chamber music ===
Miller's compositions have been performed by:

- Ludovico Ensemble, Tufts University, September 27, 2018. “Rocks Music” (for Solo Cello), “The Solar System Sonata” (for piano and string quartet), and “Three Skies” (for viola and piano). All three of these compositions are structured primarily by natural phenomena.
- Callithumpian Consort, New England Conservatory, February 18, 2016. "Scream, Gilgamesh, Scream". Commissioned and written for piano, soprano voice, baritone voice, two percussionists, electric guitar, alto sax, bass clarinet, french horn, string quartet, and synthesizer. Miller played the guitar parts.
- Summer Institute for Contemporary Performance Practice, New England Conservatory, June 2012. "Vines for Music". Written for three pianists at one prepared piano, two cellos, one viola, and two violins.

== Non-musical activities ==
Miller has blogged for Slate and HuffPost, and written a review about Mike Goldsmith's book Discord for The Wall Street Journal. His short story "Insect Futures" was published in Penny Ante III. His drawings have appeared in numerous shows since 2003.

Miller also has conducted "A Night of Surrealist Games" at Arts at the Armory (Somerville, MA), Mass MoCA (North Adams, MA), the Institute of Contemporary Art (Boston, MA), Real Art Ways (Hartford, CT), 3S Artspace (Portsmouth, NH), Portsmouth Book & Bar (Portsmouth, NH), Brattleboro Museum and Art Center (Brattleboro, VT), 118 Elliot Gallery (Brattleboro, VT), and Epsilon Spires (Brattleboro, VT). He has shown his Surrealist drawings in solo and group exhibitions.

== Discography ==
=== Solo albums ===
- The Green Man (Don Giovanni Records, 2026)
- Curiosity for Solo Electric Guitar Ensemble (Cuneiform, 2024)
- Eight Dream Interpretations for Solo Electric Guitar Ensemble (Cuneiform, 2022)
- The Benevolent Disruptive Ray (SST, 1996)
- Elemental Guitar (SST, 1995)
- XYLYL and A Woman in Half (New Alliance, 1991)
- Win! Instantly! (SST, 1989)
- Oh (Forced Exposure, 1988)
- The Big Industry (Ace of Hearts, 1987)
- No Man Is Hurting Me (Ace of Hearts, 1986)
- Groping Hands EP (Ace of Hearts, 1986)

=== The Fourth World Quartet ===
- 1975 (Cuneiform, 2021)

=== Anvil Orchestra ===
- The History of the Civil War (CD, Cosmic Cowboy, 2022)

=== Alloy Orchestra/Anvil Orchestra ===
- The Adventures of Prince Achmed (CD)
- The Cabinet of Dr. Caligari (CD)
- L'inhumaine Blu-ray
- Phantom of the Opera Blu-ray and DVD
- Man with the Movie Camera DVD and Blu-ray (Image)
- STRIKE! DVD (Image)
- Fatty Arbuckle Vol. I and II DVD (KINO)
- The General/Steamboat Bill, Jr. DVD (Image)
- Slapstick Masters DVD (Image)
- The Lost World DVD (Image)
- Phantom of the Opera Blu-ray (Image)
- Dragonflies the Baby Cries DVD
- Manslaughter DVD (KINO)
- Wild and Weird DVD
- Masters Of Slapstick CD (Accurate, 2001)
- Lonesome CD (Accurate, 1996)
- Silents CD (Accurate, 1998)
- Metropolis CD (Alloy Orchestra)
- Underworld CD (Alloy Orchestra)

=== Binary System ===
With Roger Miller and Larry Dersch:

- Invention Box (Atavistic, 2001)
- from the Epicenter (Atavistic, 1999)
- Boston Underbelly V/A Compilation "Impov. #4 October 5, 1996" (Sublingual, 1998)
- Live at the Idea Room (SST, 1997)

=== Birdsongs of the Mesozoic ===
- Dawn of the Cycads (Cuneiform, 2010)
- Soundtracks V/A Compilation "To A Random" (Arf Arf, 1987)
- Beat of the Mesozoic (Ace of Hearts, 1985)
- Magnetic Flip (Ace of Hearts, 1984)
- Birdsongs of the Mesozoic EP (Ace of Hearts, 1983)
- A Wicked Good Time V/A Compilation "Pulse Piece" (Modern Method, 1981)

=== Dredd Foole and the Din ===
With Dredd Foole, Roger Miller, Clint Conley, Pete Prescott, Martin Swope:

- Songs in Heat, "So Tough" b/w "Sanctuary" (Loose Music/Religious Records, 1982)

=== M2 ===
With Roger Miller, Benjamin Miller:

- At Land's Edge (Feeding Tube Records, 2012)

=== M3 ===
With Roger Miller, Ben Miller, Larry Miller:

- Unearthing (Sublingual, 2001)
- M-3 (New Alliance Records, 1993)

=== Roger Miller 45s ===
- Big Steam (Good Road Records, 2012)
- FWP 45 (Fun World Products, 2011)

=== No Man ===
- How the West Was Won (SST, 1991)
- Whamon Express (SST, 1990)
- Damage the Enemy (New Alliance, 1989)

=== Out Trios Volume One ===
With William Hooker, Roger Miller, Lee Ranaldo:

- Monsoon (Atavistic, 2002)

=== Roger Miller's Exquisite Corpse ===
- Unfold (SST, 1994)

=== Sproton Layer ===
With Roger Miller, Ben Miller, and Larry Miller:

- Press Your Hand and the Whole Room Fluctuates (12XU Records, 2026)
- With Magnetic Fields Disrupted (World in Sound Records, 2011, recorded 1970)
- With Magnetic Fields Disrupted (New Alliance Records, 1991, recorded 1970)
- Lost Behind Words 45 ((New Alliance Records, 1991, recorded 1970)

=== Trinary System ===
With Roger Miller, Larry Dersch, and P. Andrew Willis:

- Lights in the Center of Your Head (LP, 2019)
- Amplify the Amplifiers (5-song EP and 7") (Fun World, 2016)
- The Hard Machine (full album, Cuneiform Records, 2026)
