= Venereology (album) =

Studio album by Merzbow
- Released: September 1994
- Recorded: January–February 1994
- Venues: Yaneura II, Tokyo
- Studios: ZSF Produkt Studio, Tokyo
- Genre: Noise
- Length: 50:16 (CD); 76:40 (vinyl)
- Label: Release Entertainment
- Producer: Masami Akita

Merzbow chronology
Electroploitation (1994)	Venereology (1994)	Noisembryo (1994)

Professional ratings
Review scores
Source	Rating
Exclaim!	7/10
PopMatters	8/10

Venereology is an album by the Japanese noise musician Merzbow. It was inspired by death metal and grindcore.

It was the first of five Merzbow albums released by the American heavy metal label Relapse Records, under their Release Entertainment imprint, and as such was responsible for bringing Merzbow's work to a much wider audience in the United States. Venereology has also gained notoriety for the loudness of its mastering, which violated American limitations on the dynamic range allowed on CDs, and for its third track, "I Lead You Towards Glorious Times", which is often cited to be the loudest track created in CD format—having a RMS value of 0.00dB. The liner notes includes an extensive thank you list in the style of many metal releases.

Venereology was reissued on vinyl with a revised track list and bonus tracks by Relapse in March 2019.

== Background ==
Venereology was my first release on a death metal label. So, my target was "death metal" itself. I used more serious dead visuals than on the usual death metal albums. For me, it's like J. P. Witkin or J. G. Ballard. The rhythm in Venereology was a little slower than in my past releases, but more heavy. Also, the tone of Venereology was lots of overlevels and dirty sound. It's important to know that I made Venereology while drinking lots of beer. These essences are all influenced by death metal. But not musically. I liked something more extreme than the death metal rules.

— Masami Akita

Akita then explained that his next album for Relapse, Pulse Demon, was back to his normal sound and was recorded sober.

== Track listing ==
All music is composed by Masami Akita.

CD
No.	Title	Length
1.	"Ananga-Ranga"	29:02
2.	"Klo Ken Phantasie"	9:22
3.	"I Lead You Towards Glorious Times" (excerpt from live at Yaneura II, 5 February 1994)	5:29
4.	"Slave New Desart"	6:22

All music is composed by Masami Akita.

LP side one
No.	Title	Length
1.	"Ananga-Ranga Part 1"	20:22

LP side two
No.	Title	Length
1.	"Ananga-Ranga Part 2"	8:39
2.	"Klo Ken Phantasie"	9:20

LP side three
No.	Title	Length
1.	"Last Splash"	5:24
2.	"Slave New Desart"	6:19
3.	"TD 3"	7:32

LP side four
No.	Title	Length
1.	"Outtrack 1"	14:58
2.	"Outtrack 2"	5:26

== Personnel ==
Credits adapted from the album notes.

Musicians

- Masami Akita – performer, "decomposition," mixing
- Kazuyoshi Kimoto – bass guitar on end part of "Klo Ken Phantasie" and on "Outtrack 2"
- Reiko Azuma – noise on "I Lead You Towards Glorious Times"
- Bara – vocals on "I Lead You Towards Glorious Times" and "Slave New Desart"

Technical and visual personnel

- Mackerel Can Molding Company – live recording on "I Lead You Towards Glorious Times"
- Antoine Bernhart – atrocity photos research
- Naomi Hosokawa – photos transformation assistance
- Abtechtonics – art direction, color
- David Shirk – mastering [CD]
- James Plotkin – mastering [LP reissue]
- Jonathan Canady – additional design [LP reissue]
- Jacob Speis – layout [LP reissue]
- Matt Jacobson – executive producer, visual and logo interpretation for production
- Bill Yurkiewicz – executive producer
- Masami Akita – remixing and rearrangement from original DAT tapes at Munemihouse, Tokyo in October 2018 (LP reissue)

== Release history ==
Release history and formats for Venereology
Region	Date	Label	Format	Quantity	Catalog	Notes
United States	1994	Release	CD	n/a	RR6910-2	
Russia	2006	Irond	CD	n/a	IROND CD 06-1120	
United States	2019	Relapse	LP	650	RR6669	black vinyl
United States	2019	Relapse	LP	250	RR6669	neon violet vinyl
United States	2019	Relapse	LP	100	RR6669	purple/white with red splatter vinyl
United States	2019	Relapse	LP	100	RR6669	clear vinyl
