= Batztoutai with Memorial Gadgets =

Studio album by Merzbow
- Released: August 1986
- Recorded: August–October 1985
- Studio: ZSF Produkt Studio, Asagaya, Tokyo
- Genre: Noise; musique concrète
- Length: 92:45
- Label: RRRecords
- Producer: Masami Akita

Merzbow chronology
Antimonument (1986)	Batztoutai with Memorial Gadgets (1986)	Econdage (1987)

Batztoutai with Memorial Gadgets is a double album by the Japanese noise musician Merzbow. It was later remixed and reissued in 1993 as Batztoutai with Material Gadgets: De-Composed Works 1985~86.

== Background ==
The album is named after – and the title track samples – Battōtai (抜刀隊, Sword-drawing brigade), a Japanese military march composed by Charles Edouard Gabriel Leroux. Illustrations of the brigade are depicted on the cover, along with the Imperial Seal of Japan.

Some of the album's theme and titles were inspired by the botanist Tanaka Yoshio, who was Masami Akita's maternal great-grandfather. Tanaka founded the Ueno Zoo, hence the zoological titles. The track "Semykyoku" (舎密局, Seimikyoku) refers to the institute where Tanaka was employed.

In an interview with Arthur Potter, Masami Akita explains how this LP and Antimonument were inspired by his native culture:

[...] musical composition and behavior are always related to the structure of one's own language and way of thinking. I'd like to use Japanese-like images and words on purpose, as a way of randomly mixing significant cultural details. For example I used the Imperial Crest of the Chrysanthemum behind another image on the cover of the Batz-Tou-Tai LP. [...] These were not presented directly, but as subliminal images. Of course, the Japanese did not respond to them in the context I placed them. The reason those images were used was that I'd been researching misreadings of Japanese public history, and wrote about that in a book called Mannerism of Heterodoxa.

Akita then explains how the sound of his music changed over time, saying that Batztoutai "uses lots of loops and cut-up sounds from other records".

== Recordings ==
The album samples many electroacoustic / modern classical works by artists including François Bayle, Conlon Nancarrow, Ivo Malec, and Luc Ferrari. "Junk Dahkini" samples the Rendlesham UFO tape, also used on Pornoise/1kg.

Full-length versions of "Anus Anvil Anxiety", "Mortegage", and "Batztoutai" were later released in the Merzbox, along with an unreleased track from the sessions. Alternate mixes and outtakes were released in 2019 on the albums Batztoutai Mix and Jinrinkinmouzui.

The tracks "Semykyoku", "Anus Anvil Anxiety" and "Mortegage" from the original release are missing from the remix. "Intermission" is a short excerpt of "Dahkini Disko" from the original.

The material on Loop Panic Limited is primarily taken from the then-unreleased Agni Hotra. "Industrial Pollusion 2" is a version of "3 Types of Industrial Pollusion", included on the reissue of Antimonument. The album title might be a reference to the underground publisher Loompanics Unlimited.

The track "Fireploof Enema 1" was used on Russell Haswell's track "Micromedley" on the Merzbow remix album Scumtron.

== Reception ==
In 2003, Matmos included the album in a list of the best musique concrète albums; they said: "What Coldcut's Journey by DJs set is to the hip-hop mixtape, this baby is to musique concrète: a double exposure of elaborately detourned and fricasseed material which was already quite tricked out in the first place."

== Track listing ==
=== LP ===
Side one
No.	Title	Length
1.	"Uluk Constitution"	3:43
2.	"This Dying Toad Become Forthwith Like Coal for Colour Black"	9:33
3.	"One Eyed Metal"	9:53

Side two
No.	Title	Length
1.	"Batz Tou Tai–The Nightingale's Song"	17:29
2.	"Junk Dahkini"	6:13

Side three
No.	Title	Length
1.	"Semykyoku"	4:27
2.	"Anus Anvil Anxiety"	7:05
3.	"Dahkini Disko"	10:58

Side four
No.	Title	Length
1.	"Mortegage"	5:04
2.	"Wild Animals and Polyhedral Garden"	18:20

=== CD ===
In to the Void of Record Archeive [sic]
No.	Title	Length
1.	"Uluk Constitution"	2:50
2.	"This Dying Toad Become Forth with Coal for Colour Black"	6:12
3.	"One Eyed Metal"	7:47
4.	"Batztoutai–The Nightingale's Song"	14:37
5.	"Intermission"	1:26
6.	"Junk Dahkini"	1:24
7.	"Gothol Exodomy"	25:32
8.	"Wild Animal & Polythedral Garden"	16:32
Total length:		76:22

Loop Panic Limited
No.	Title	Length
1.	"Agni Hotra Loop 1"	0:24
2.	"Fireploof Enema 1"	3:23
3.	"Arbeltus Magnus Mix 1"	6:22
4.	"Arbeltus Magnus Mix 2"	2:02
5.	"Sado Feedback Loop"	4:08
6.	"Agni Hotra Loop 2"	1:59
7.	"Agni Hotra Loop 3"	1:16
8.	"Agni Hotra Loop 4"	1:27
9.	"Agni Hotra Loop 5"	2:36
10.	"Asagaya Field Recording"	4:12
11.	"Strange Orange"	2:43
12.	"Strange Orange 2"	2:47
13.	"Micon Dick"	7:26
14.	"Fireploof Enema 2"	1:54
15.	"Industrial Pollusion 2"	6:23
16.	"Electric Tatara"	1:27
17.	"Karl-Marx Is Sutra"	1:26
18.	"De-Soundtracks 1"	7:50
Total length:		59:45

== Personnel ==
- Masami Akita – performer
- Ron Lessard – song selection
- Ad Suprex – artworks, design
- Maggie Whaley – visual interpretation for production
