= Merzbox =

Box set compilation by Merzbow

Box set by Merzbow
- Released: June 16, 2000
- Recorded: December 27, 1979 – March 30, 1997
- Genres: Noise, free improvisation, industrial
- Length: 49:54:47
- Label: Extreme
- Producer: Masami Akita

Merzbow chronology
Collapse 12 Floors (2000)	Merzbox (2000)	Live at Radio 100 (2000)

Professional ratings
Review scores
Source	Rating
Allmusic	2.5/5 stars
Chunklet	ambivalent
Epicharmus	favorable
Stylus	neutral

Merzbox is a box set compilation by the Japanese noise musician Merzbow. It consists of 50 CDs spanning Merzbow's career from 1979 to 1997. 30 discs are taken from long out of print releases, while 20 are composed mainly of unreleased material. The box also contains two CD-ROMs, six CD-sized round cards, six round stickers, a poster, a black long-sleeve T-shirt, a medallion, and the Merzbook, all packaged together in a "fetish" black rubber box. It is limited to 1000 numbered copies. A Merzbox Sampler was released in 1997.

The Merzbook, subtitled The Pleasuredome of Noise, is a 132-page hardcover book written by Brett Woodward with over 100 images. It contains an extensive biography, culled from previous interviews and articles, a new interview, and essays by Achim Wollscheid, Jim O'Rourke, Damion Romero, Eugene Thacker, and Jonathan Walker. Masami Akita provides extensive liner notes for each disc. The book was also released separately with the Merzrom included.

The Merzrom is an interactive multimedia CD-ROM, designed by Troy Innocent. A second CD-ROM contains various Extreme press and a catalog. The "Merzdallion" medallion was designed by Marcus Davidson. Art direction and design were by Doriana Corda. Audio mastering was by François Tétaz.

== History ==
Extreme's original plan was to reissue Collaborative, their only vinyl release, for the label's tenth anniversary. There was then discussion of reissuing other early releases, with talk of a ten disc box, the number was finally set at 50 discs. The Merzbox was originally scheduled for release in late 1997, and available for pre-order, but kept getting delayed until it was finally released in 2000. It was officially launched on June 16, 2000, at Sónar, Barcelona, where Merzbow also performed.

Those who had pre-ordered received a two CD album called Decomposition with remixes of Eugene Thacker and Shane Fahey followed by the original tracks, the Merzbox Sampler, and two posters. These were then made available with purchase of the Merzbox for extra money.

The Merzbox was exhibited at Kunsthalle Wien, Vienna from April 4 to April 7, 2002. Merzbow performed opening and closing concerts. All 60 hours were webcast live.

In December 2002, Georgia Tech's student-run radio station WREK broadcast the entire 50-disc Merzbox without interruption. An article in Creative Loafing described the Merzbow Marathon as "what may be the most obscure and counterintuitive move in the history of radio."

Between the final recordings of the set and its release, Merzbow switched to using a laptop, having first acquired a Macintosh to work on the artwork for the set.

Masami Akita has stated in a 2009 interview that he has enough unreleased material for another 50 CD box. Between 2010 and 2013, he released four 10 box sets of unreleased raw material recorded from 1987 to 1997; Merzbient, Merzphysics, Merzmorphosis, and Duo. 2012 also saw the release of Lowest Music & Arts 1980–1983, a 10 LP box set that included some full-length albums only partially released in the Merzbox. Since 2018, further archival recordings have been released through Japanese label Slowdown Records, including the 60 CD boxset 10×6=60 in 2021.

== Album listing ==
=== OM Electrique ===
OM Electrique

Studio album by Merzbow
- Recorded: December 27, 1979 at home
- Length: 58:38

The first noise recordings of Merzbow. Previously unreleased.

All tracks are written by Masami Akita.

No.	Title	Length
1.	"OM Electrique Part 1"	31:17
2.	"OM Electrique Part 2"	7:55
3.	"Untitled Taped Drum Solo"	8:59
4.	"Untitled Guitar Solo"	10:25

==== Personnel ====
- Masami Akita – tape recorder, percussion, meditation, guitar, Merztronics, taped drums, voice, water

=== Metal Acoustic Music ===
Metal Acoustic Music

Studio album by Merzbow
- Recorded: January 1980 at home
- Length: 46:59

Earliest Merzbow recording available until the release of the Merzbox.

All tracks are written by Masami Akita.

No.	Title	Length
1.	"Balance of Neurosis"	46:59

==== Notes ====
- Side one of the Metal Acoustic Music cassette, Lowest Music & Arts, 1981

==== Personnel ====
- Masami Akita – Merztronics, tape recorder, recorded percussion

=== Remblandt Assemblage ===
Remblandt Assemblage

Studio album by Merzbow
- Recorded: 1980 at home
- Length: 53:19

First work using tape manipulation. Only a few copies distributed.

All tracks are written by Masami Akita.

No.	Title	Length
1.	"Remblandt Assemblage"	9:44
2.	"Voice of Scwitters"	2:09
3.	"Theme of Dadaist"	9:39
4.	"Hans Arp"	1:47
5.	"Tape Dada"	5:52
6.	"Music Concret"	2:34
7.	"Prepared Guitar Solo 1"	17:32
8.	"Prepared Guitar Solo 2"	3:59

==== Notes ====
- Mixed at Lowest Music & Arts, 1980
- All tracks from Remblandt Assemblage cassette, Lowest Music & Arts, 1981

==== Personnel ====
- Masami Akita – tapes, prepared acoustic guitar, noise, tabla, percussion, microphone, voice, radio, concret sounds, egg cutter

=== Collection Era Vol. 1 ===
Collection Era Vol. 1

Compilation album by Merzbow
- Recorded: 1981 at various locations
- Length: 66:16

The three Collection Era discs are compiled from the ten volume Collection series. The first five volumes were recorded for Ylem and consist of studio sessions with Kiyoshi Mizutani. However, Ylem went out of business before they could be released. Masami Akita then released them himself and recorded five more at home using previous Collection session recordings mixed with new material and effects.

No.	Title	Length
1.	"Electric Environment"	24:00
2.	"Untitled Material Action"	23:57
3.	"Telecom Manipulation"	18:18

==== Notes ====
- Mixed at Ylem/Gap Works, Tokyo, 3 June 1981
- Tracks 1–2 from Collection 001 cassette, Lowest Music & Arts, 1981
- Track 3 from Collection 002 cassette, Lowest Music & Arts, 1981

==== Personnel ====
- Masami Akita – tapes, ring modulator, violin, tabla, voice, guitar, percussion, drums, radio
- Kiyoshi Mizutani – drums on track 1, percussion on track 2, organ on track 3

=== Collection Era Vol. 2 ===
Note: The contents of CD 5 and CD 6 were switched (5 has eight tracks and 6 has seven), the info below is as it appears in the Merzbook.

Collection Era Vol. 2

Compilation album by Merzbow
- Recorded: 1981 at various locations
- Length: 66:45

No.	Title	Length
1.	"Merz Rock 1"	1:58
2.	"Merz Rock 2"	8:23
3.	"Merz Gamlan 1"	15:54
4.	"Merz Gamlan 2"	5:55
5.	"Merz Scat"	11:29
6.	"Merztronics Jazz Mix"	11:45
7.	"Merztronics Rhythm Mix"	11:17

==== Notes ====
- Mixed at Lowest Music & Arts, 1981
- Tracks 1–4 from Collection 007 cassette, Lowest Music & Arts, 1981
- Track 5 from Collection 009 cassette, Lowest Music & Arts, 1981
- Tracks 6–7 from Collection 010 cassette, Lowest Music & Arts, 1982
- Merztronics tape used on tracks 6–7

==== Personnel ====
- Masami Akita – taped drums, tabla, guitar, tapes, Synare 3, percussion, ring modulated recorders, voice, endless tape, noise, rhythm box
- Kiyoshi Mizutani – wood bass on track 6

=== Collection Era Vol. 3 ===
Collection Era Vol. 3

Compilation album by Merzbow
- Recorded: 1981–1982 at Lowest Music & Arts
- Length: 66:56

No.	Title	Length
1.	Untitled	5:17
2.	Untitled	5:59
3.	Untitled	10:35
4.	Untitled	6:13
5.	Untitled	4:53
6.	Untitled	6:51
7.	Untitled	3:14
8.	Untitled	22:52

==== Notes ====
- Tracks 1–7 from Collection 008 cassette, Lowest Music & Arts, 1981
- Track 8 from Tridal Production cassette, Lowest Music & Arts, 1982

==== Personnel ====
- Masami Akita – guitar, tape, damaged tape recorder, bass guitar, Dr. Rhythm, ring modulator, percussion, rubber guitar, violin, tape loops, Synare 3, tabla, drums, synthesizer
- Kiyoshi Mizutani – guitar on track 1, piano on track 4, violin on tracks 7–8

=== Paradoxa Paradoxa ===
Paradoxa Paradoxa

Live album by Merzbow
- Recorded: March 22, 1981 at Kid Ailack Art Hall, Tokyo
- Length: 72:23

The first Merzbow live performance.

No.	Title	Length
1.	"Paradoxa Paradoxa Pt. 1"	46:14
2.	"Paradoxa Paradoxa Pt. 2"	26:08

==== Notes ====
- Mastered from original live recording
- Track 1 from Paradoxa Paradoxa cassette, Lowest Music & Arts, 1982
- Track 2 previously unreleased

==== Personnel ====
- Masami Akita – Merztronix, tape, solar organ on track 2, violin, Dr. Rhythm, alto saxophone, radio, feedback
- Kiyoshi Mizutani – solar organ on track 1, violin, tape, piano
- Masahiro Kurose – live recording

=== Material Action for 2 Microphones ===
Material Action for 2 Microphones

Studio album by Merzbow
- Recorded: July 1981 at Mizutani home studio, Kasai
- Length: 70:45

"Material Action" was a term for using household objects to make quiet sounds, which were then amplified, inspired by John Cage's "Cartridge Music". The term itself was taken from Otto Muehl. This recording was used as raw material for other works such as Material Action 2 N.A.M.

No.	Title	Length
1.	"Hoochie Coochie Scratched Man"	25:31
2.	"Yumin, Non Stop Disco"	21:14
3.	"New Acoustic Music No. 7"	23:58

==== Notes ====
- Mixed at Lowest Music & Arts Studio, 1981
- Tracks 1–2 from Material Action for 2 Microphones cassette, Lowest Music & Arts, 1981

==== Personnel ====
- Masami Akita – condenser microphone, environmental percussion, scratched sound, tapes, turntable, radio
- Kiyoshi Mizutani – condenser microphone, percussion, additional synthesizer

=== Yantra Material Action ===
Yantra Material Action

Studio album by Merzbow
- Recorded: 1981 at various locations
- Length: 42:33

Originally intended to be the first Merzbow LP, but it went unreleased. Six months later the label then asked again to release the LP, but Akita decided to record new material – which became Material Action 2 N.A.M. Includes reworks of past recordings with added effects and new instrumentation. The liner notes were to have been written by Fred Frith, who heard the tape and liked it.

All tracks are written by Masami Akita.

No.	Title	Length
1.	Untitled	11:25
2.	Untitled	2:52
3.	Untitled	1:48
4.	Untitled	4:37
5.	Untitled	1:06
6.	Untitled	8:40
7.	Untitled	7:26
8.	Untitled	4:35

==== Notes ====
- Mixed at Junktion Music Works, 1981
- All tracks from Yantra Material Action cassette, Lowest Music & Arts, 1983

==== Personnel ====
- Masami Akita – tapes, junks, noise, percussion, radio, drums, guitar
- Kiyoshi Mizutani – percussion, guitar, keyboards, synthesizer, tapes
- H. Kawagishi – sound engineering

=== Solonoise ===
Solonoise

Compilation album by Merzbow
- Recorded: 1982 at Lowest Music & Arts
- Length: 69:58

Solonoise means "Solar-Noise", inspired by Georges Bataille's The Solar Anus.

All tracks are written by Masami Akita.

No.	Title	Length
1.	"Solonoise Pt. 1"	23:55
2.	"Solonoise Pt. 2"	23:42
3.	"Solonoise Pt. 3"	22:21

==== Notes ====
- Tracks 1–2 from Solonoise 1 cassette, Lowest Music & Arts, 1982
- Track 3 from Solonoise 2 cassette, Lowest Music & Arts, 1982

==== Personnel ====
- Masami Akita – electronics, ring modulator, violin, voice, treated tapes, acoustic guitar, Nil Vagina tape loop, treated percussion, Synare 3, TV, styrofoam
- Kiyoshi Mizutani – violin, electric piano on track 1

=== Expanded Music ===
Expanded Music

Compilation album by Merzbow
- Recorded: 1982 at Lowest Music & Arts
- Length: 65:24

Conceptual works manipulating various inputs using feedback processed audio mixer. Inspired by Stan Brakhage's scratched films.

All tracks are written by Masami Akita.

No.	Title	Length
1.	"Manipulation 1"	17:37
2.	"Manipulation 2"	5:28
3.	"Manipulation 3"	6:36
4.	"Manipulation 4"	3:53
5.	"Manipulation 5"	2:51
6.	"Manipulation 6"	2:15
7.	"Manipulation 7"	1:57
8.	"Manipulation 8"	5:45
9.	"M.F.S.W 1"	18:58

==== Notes ====
- Tracks 1–8 from Expanded Music 2 cassette, Lowest Music & Arts, 1982
- Track 9 from Musick from Simulation World cassette, Lowest Music & Arts, 1983

==== Personnel ====
- Masami Akita – TV test signal, feedback mixer, damaged tape recorder, Dr. Rhythm, tapes, percussion, synthesizer

=== Nil Vagina Tape Loops ===
Nil Vagina Tape Loops

Compilation album by Merzbow
- Recorded: 1982 at Lowest Music & Arts
- Length: 75:26

Featuring a four track tape recorder found in the street. A different sound was recorded on each track, and then played back randomly.

All tracks are written by Masami Akita.

No.	Title	Length
1.	"Nil Vagina Tape Loop No. 0"	14:08
2.	"Nil Vagina Tape Loop No. 1"	30:19
3.	"Nil Vagina Tape Loop No. 2"	28:28

==== Personnel ====
- Masami Akita – Sony 464 tape recorder, Nil Vagina tape loop, treated tapes, percussion, Synare 3, Dr. Rhythm

==== Notes ====
- Track 1 from Solonoise 2 cassette, Lowest Music & Arts, 1982
- Tracks 2–3 from Lowest Music 2 cassette, Lowest Music & Arts, 1982

=== Material Action 2 N.A.M ===
Material Action 2 N.A.M

Studio album by Merzbow
- Recorded: September–October 1982 at Junktion Music Works, Tokyo
- Length: 40:59

The first Merzbow LP. The 2 in the title refers to Yantra Material Action, which was meant to be the first LP. Sounds include styrofoam and a typesetting machine (Kiyoshi Mizutani worked at a typesetting company at the time). Includes raw material from Material Action for 2 Microphones.

No.	Title	Length
1.	"Nil Ad Mirari"	22:47
2.	"Nimbus Alter Magneto Electricity"	18:12

==== Notes ====
- All tracks from Material Action 2 N.A.M. LP, Chaos, 1983

==== Personnel ====
- Masami Akita – tapes, junk percussion, electro-acoustical noise, organ, tape collage, recording, mixing
- Kiyoshi Mizutani – tapes, synthesizer, violin, machine noise
- H. Kawagishi – engineering

=== Mechanization Takes Command ===
Mechanization Takes Command

Studio album by Merzbow
- Recorded: 1982–1983 at Merz-bau Studio, Machida and ZSF Produkt Studio, Asagaya
- Length: 69:37

First release on ZSF Produkt. Akita changed the name of his label since he wanted to release other artists. Featuring the Synare 3, which was later destroyed by Bara on stage in the late 90s.

All tracks are written by Masami Akita.

No.	Title	Length
1.	"Electric Pygmy Decollage"	14:12
2.	"Mechanization Takes Command"	11:01
3.	"Peaches Red Indian"	10:46
4.	"Sahara"	5:44
5.	"Iggy"	3:15
6.	"Suicidal Machine"	14:17
7.	"Ai-Da-Ho"	10:19

==== Notes ====
- Mixed at ZSF Produkt Studio, Asagaya March 1983
- All tracks from Mechanization Takes Command cassette, ZSF Produkt, 1983

==== Personnel ====
- Masami Akita – Pearl drum kit, various percussion, tapes, TV, Synare 3, voice, tabla, Dr. Rhythm, ring modulator, guitar, feedback, synthesizer, recorder, scrap metals, devices

=== Dying Mapa Tapes 1–2 ===
Dying Mapa Tapes 1–2

Studio album by Merzbow
- Recorded: March 27–28 and May 5, 1982 at Merz-bau, Tokyo
- Length: 68:33

Title inspired by the Nyingmapa school of Tibetan Buddhism. Made with different equipment and instruments than other recordings of the same period. Featuring instruments recorded on tape, then slowed down or played backwards.

No.	Title	Length
1.	"Denegation"	10:07
2.	"Indifferent Pt. 1"	6:20
3.	"Indifferent Pt. 2"	8:01
4.	"Ooinon for Satva Karman (Sprashutavia) Decoup"	21:46
5.	"Dharma Kamarage"	22:17

==== Notes ====
- Produced by Lowest Music & Arts, 1982
- Tracks 1–4 from Dying Mapa I cassette, Aeon, 1983
- Track 5 from Dying Mapa II cassette, Aeon, 1983

==== Personnel ====
- Masami Akita – tapes, radio, ring modulator, percussion, noise, rhythm box, guitar
- Kiyoshi Mizutani – violin, percussion

=== Dying Mapa Tapes 2–3 ===
Dying Mapa Tapes 2–3

Studio album by Merzbow
- Recorded: March 27–28, 1982 at Merz-bau, Tokyo
- Length: 69:40

No.	Title	Length
1.	"Sukha, Chanda, Tanno, Kless"	23:28
2.	"Genetic Erotic (Sie Wiro Weib)"	22:57
3.	"Rejet, Ictus, Connotation, Accompagnement, Penisersatz, Stigma Indelible etc."	23:14

==== Notes ====
- Produced by Lowest Music & Arts, 1982
- Track 1 from Dying Mapa II cassette, Aeon, 1983
- Tracks 2–3 from Dying Mapa III cassette, Aeon, 1983

==== Personnel ====
- Masami Akita – tapes, radio, ring modulator, percussion, noise, rhythm, junk electronics, TV, guitar, bass
- Kiyoshi Mizutani – violin, percussion

=== Agni Hotra ===
Agni Hotra

Studio album by Merzbow
- Recorded: 1984–1985 at ZSF Produkt, Asagaya
- Length: 63:09

Originally intended to be the second Merzbow LP, but it went unreleased. Includes outtakes from Ushi-tra, which is from the same period. Loops were included on Loop Panic Limited.

No.	Title	Length
1.	"Agni Hotra"	18:26
2.	"Asagaya in Rain"	3:51
3.	"Swamp Metal"	6:29
4.	"Loops in Flames"	12:30
5.	"Arbertus Magnus"	7:14
6.	"Kunyan"	7:52
7.	"Untitled Waves"	6:45

==== Notes ====
- Tracks 1–4 from first Agni Hotra master
- Track 5 from second Agni Hotra master
- Track 6 appeared with different mix on Ushi-tra cassette, Cause & Effect, 1985
- Track 7 from Ushi-tra recording session

==== Personnel ====
- Masami Akita – distorted tape loops, metals, recorder, tapes, tape reel, percussion, shakujo, bells, noise

=== Pornoise 1kg Vol. 1 ===
Pornoise 1kg Vol. 1

Compilation album by Merzbow
- Recorded: December 1984 at ZSF Produkt Studio, Asagaya
- Length: 59:17

In the 80s Masami Akita had a mail art project called Pornoise, in which he made collages using discarded magazines – in particular pornographic magazines – taken from the trash. These were then sent along with his cassettes, the idea being that his art was like cheap mail order pornography. Pornoise/1kg was released as part of these activities; the 1 kg refers to the total weight of the original package. The voice on "Night Noise White" is taken from the "Halt Tape".

All tracks are written by Masami Akita.

No.	Title	Length
1.	"Industrial"	3:32
2.	"Loop Fuck 1"	6:12
3.	"Loop Fuck 2"	5:39
4.	"Obituary 1"	5:15
5.	"Obituary 2"	7:12
6.	"Night Noise White"	31:24

==== Notes ====
- All tracks from Pornoise/1kg cassette box, ZSF Produkt, 1984

==== Personnel ====
- Masami Akita – distorted Sony 464, feedback mixer, radio, loop tapes, Synare 3, rhythm box, ring modulator, devices
- Kiyoshi Mizutani – taped typesetting machine noise and taped synthesizer on tracks 2–4 with distorted process

=== Pornoise 1kg Vol. 2 ===
Pornoise 1kg Vol. 2

Compilation album by Merzbow
- Recorded: December 1984 at ZSF Produkt Studio, Asagaya
- Length: 61:35

Field recordings on "Dynamite Don Don" include street sounds recorded from a moving bicycle, and a house being demolished across from Akita's apartment.

All tracks are written by Masami Akita.

No.	Title	Length
1.	"New Karhma"	31:24
2.	"Dynamite Don Don Pt. 1"	16:54
3.	"Dynamite Don Don Pt. 2"	13:16

==== Notes ====
- All tracks from Pornoise/1kg cassette box, ZSF Produkt, 1984

==== Personnel ====
- Masami Akita – distorted Sony 464, feedback mixer, loop tapes, Synare 3, ring modulator, field recording tapes, devices

=== Pornoise 1kg Vol. 3 ===
Pornoise 1kg Vol. 3

Compilation album by Merzbow
- Recorded: December 1984 at ZSF Produkt Studio, Asagaya
- Length: 59:41

The voice on "UFO vs British Army" is taken from the "Halt Tape". Some other samples are from horror films.

All tracks are written by Masami Akita.

No.	Title	Length
1.	"UFO vs British Army"	30:46
2.	"Toy 69"	28:55

==== Notes ====
- All tracks from Pornoise/1kg cassette box, ZSF Produkt, 1984

==== Personnel ====
- Masami Akita – distorted Sony 464, feedback mixer, loop tapes, Synare 3, ring modulator, devices

=== Pornoise Extra ===
Pornoise Extra

Studio album by Merzbow
- Recorded: December 1984 at ZSF Produkt Studio, Asagaya
- Length: 59:26

Additional tracks from the Pornoise 1kg sessions. Original release had different track titles.

All tracks are written by Masami Akita.

No.	Title	Length
1.	"Flesh Radio 1"	4:49
2.	"Flesh Radio 2"	4:51
3.	"Dance of Dharma-Kala"	13:29
4.	"Psycotic Orange"	0:42
5.	"Helgas Death Disco"	5:34
6.	"Eros Pandra"	8:28
7.	"Kirie"	6:45
8.	"Domine"	5:54
9.	"Chopin Is Dead"	5:55
10.	"Risa Supersex"	2:55

==== Notes ====
- All tracks from Pornoise/Extra cassette, ZSF Produkt, 1985

==== Personnel ====
- Masami Akita – feedback mixer, radio, loop tapes, Synare 3, rhythm box, ring modulator, distorted Sony 464, devices
- Kiyoshi Mizutani – sampled electric piano

=== Sadomasochismo / Lampinak ===
Sadomasochismo / Lampinak

Compilation album by Merzbow
- Recorded: 1985 at ZSF Produkt Studio, Asagaya
- Length: 54:57

Includes unused tracks for Batztoutai with Memorial Gadgets

All tracks are written by Masami Akita.

No.	Title	Length
1.	"Antimony Pt. 1"	10:30
2.	"Antimony Pt. 2"	13:05
3.	"Eyes of Isonokami"	11:44
4.	"The Lampinak-Sarpent Power"	10:29
5.	"Carcass on the Floor"	4:35
6.	"Village of 8 Graves"	4:30

==== Notes ====
- Tracks 1–3 from Sadomasochismo cassette, ZSF Produkt, 1985
- Tracks 4–6 from The Lampinak cassette, ZSF Produkt, 1985

==== Personnel ====
- Masami Akita – various metal percussion, chain, loops, noise electronics, Synare 3, tapes

=== Mortegage / Batztoutai Extra ===
Mortegage / Batztoutai Extra

Compilation album by Merzbow
- Recorded: November 1984 at ZSF Produkt Studio, Asagaya
- Length: 62:03

Original recordings for the Batztoutai with Memorial Gadgets album. Includes samples from François Bayle, Conlon Nancarrow, Ivo Malec, Luc Ferrari.

All tracks are written by Masami Akita.

No.	Title	Length
1.	"Anus Anvil Anxiety" (long version)	14:40
2.	"Radio 1511"	24:01
3.	"Mortegage Inc. Batztoutai"	23:21

==== Notes ====
- Track 1 appeared edited on Batztoutai with Memorial Gadgets LP, RRRecords, 1986
- Track 2 previously unreleased
- Track 3 appeared in different order on Batztoutai with Memorial Gadgets LP

==== Personnel ====
- Masami Akita – tapes, voice, electronics, scrap metals, percussion, field recordings

=== Enclosure / Libido Economy ===
Enclosure/Libido Economy

Compilation album by Merzbow
- Recorded: July 1987, 1988, November 1989 at ZSF Produkt Studio
- Length: 58:04

First of two cassettes made with raw material from Ecobondage, Vratya Southward being the second.

All tracks are written by Masami Akita.

No.	Title	Length
1.	"Enclosure"	17:27
2.	"Scarabe"	5:33
3.	"Interline No. 1-3"	18:10
4.	"Itch"	5:39
5.	"Libido Economy No. 1"	5:39
6.	"Libido Economy No. 2"	5:32

==== Notes ====
- Tracks 1–3 from Enclosure cassette, ZSF Produkt, 1987
- Track 5 from Enkele Gemotiveerde Produktiemedewerkers compilation, Midas Music, 1990
- Track 6 from Network 77 compilation, Network 77, 1990

==== Personnel ====
- Masami Akita – bowed instruments with piano wires, ring modulator, tapes, feedback mixer, effects, percussion, turntable

=== Vratya Southward ===
Vratya Southward

Studio album by Merzbow
- Recorded: 1987 at ZSF Produkt Studio, Asagaya and July 1988 at ZSF Produkt Studio
- Length: 61:18

Second cassette made with raw material from Ecobondage. "Electric Red Desart" includes a field recording of the Menkake gyōretsu (面掛行列, mask procession) festival at the Goryō shrine in Kamakura. Masami Akita posted photos of the procession on his blog in 2010.

All tracks are written by Masami Akita.

No.	Title	Length
1.	"Electroacoustic Voyage"	23:47
2.	"Electric Red Desart"	18:19
3.	"Lightning" (bonus)	19:10

==== Notes ====
- Tracks 1–2 from Vratya Southward cassette, ZSF Produkt, 1987
- Track 3 previously unreleased

==== Personnel ====
- Masami Akita – cymbals, various percussion, electronics, paper pipe, tapes, plastic, voice, flute, toy marimba, scratch records, electric violin on tracks 1–2; feedback mixer, piano strings on metal box on track 3

=== Live in Khabarovsk, CCCP – I'm Proud by Rank of the Workers ===
Live in Khabarovsk, CCCP – I'm Proud by Rank of the Workers

Live album by Merzbow
- Recorded: March 23–24, 1988 in Khabarovsk, USSR
- Length: 57:34

First two of three performances. First performance was stopped for being "too wild", so they then played more conventionally. Includes Batztoutai material on backing tape, and Russian radio.

No.	Title	Length
1.	"Live at Trade Unions Place of Culture Hall 23 March 1988"	29:21
2.	"Live at Soviet Army Officers House Hall 24 March 1988"	28:13

==== Notes ====
- Recorded live at Jazz-on-Amur '88, Khabarovsk, Russia
- Live PA recordings by Russian staff
- Remastered from original live recording
- Different versions appeared on Live in Khabarovsk, CCCP LP, ZSF Produkt, 1988

==== Personnel ====
- Masami Akita – electric bowed instruments, tape, radio on track 1; drums, tape on track 2
- Kiyoshi Mizutani – piano, low feedback US MP guitar on track 1; piano, guitar on track 2

=== Storage ===
Storage

Studio album by Merzbow
- Recorded: February–April 1988 at ZSF Produkt Studio
- Length: 67:59

Due to issues with sound quality, the recording was edited for the LP release. The full-length recording is released here for the first time. The working title for the album was War Storage, which is now used for the track titles.

No.	Title	Length
1.	"War Storage Pt. 1"	23:02
2.	"War Storage Pt. 2"	23:48
3.	"War Storage Pt. 3"	21:08

==== Notes ====
- All tracks from Storage LP, ZSF Produkt, 1988

==== Personnel ====
- Masami Akita – bowed instruments with piano wires, percussion, tapes, effects, guitar
- Kiyoshi Mizutani – submitted raw material on track 2

=== Fission Dialogue ===
Fission Dialogue

Studio album by Merzbow
- Recorded: 1987–1988 at ZSF Produkt Studio, Asagaya
- Length: 57:47

Unreleased tracks from Ecobondage and Storage period.

All tracks are written by Masami Akita.

No.	Title	Length
1.	"White Gamlan"	16:27
2.	"Fission Dialogue"	9:08
3.	"Inside Tangues in Tera-Aspic"	32:11

==== Personnel ====
- Masami Akita – cymbals, various percussion, electronics, voice, byan, bowed instruments, paper pipe on tracks 1–2; noise electronics, turntable, scrap metals on track 3

=== Collaborative ===
Collaborative

Studio album by Merzbow + S.B.O.T.H.I.
- Recorded: 1988
- Length: 48:11
- Producers: Masami Akita, Achim Wollscheid

Essay by Jonathan Walker from the original LP is reprinted in the Merzbook.

No.	Title	Length
1.	"Joint" (Merzbow + S.B.O.T.H.I.)	20:51
2.	"Code-Geräusch-Aggregate" (S.B.O.T.H.I. + Merzbow)	20:12
3.	"Jointed" (Merzbow)	7:06

==== Notes ====
- Track 1 recorded at ZSF Produkt on 8 March 1988
- Track 2 produced 1988
- Track 3 recorded at ZSF Produkt (live) on 1 May 1988
- All tracks from Collaborative LP+7″, Extreme, 1988 [Note: The S.B.O.T.H.I. solo track from the 7″ is not included in the Merzbox]

==== Personnel ====
- Masami Akita – tapes, metals, scratch, guitar, mixing on track 3
- Kiyoshi Mizutani – samples, guitar, balalaika, byan on track 3
- Achim Wollscheid – raw materials on track 1, production on track 2

=== Crocidura Dsi Nezumi ===
Crocidura Dsi Nezumi

Studio album by Merzbow
- Recorded: August 1987 and August 1988 at ZSF Produkt Studio
- Length: 63:07

"Unplugged noise" made using household objects; violin sound is violin bow on plastic cassette case or wood, acoustic guitar is a rubber band, Tibetan trumpet is a toilet paper tube, electrical sounds are made with metal. "Environmental drums" are the floor, gas stove, the spring of a table lamp.

Names are taken from the Latin names of the Dsinezumi shrew, Japanese stoat, and Japanese least weasel. Other titles were inspired by Frank Zappa's song "The Return of the Son of Monster Magnet" and Sun Ra's album Strange Strings.

All tracks are written by Masami Akita.

No.	Title	Length
1.	"Mustela Erminea Nippon"	23:00
2.	"Mustela Sixasa Namiyei" (Including: The Revenge of the Son of Monster Magnet)	23:50
3.	"Strange Strings"	16:16

==== Notes ====
- Tracks 1-2 from Crocidura Dsi Nezumi cassette, ZSF Produkt and Banned Production, 1988
- Track 3 previously unreleased

==== Personnel ====
- Masami Akita – environmental drums, bowed instruments, paper pipe, plastic, woods, flute, insects, effects on tracks 1–2; bowed instruments, motor, noise electronics on track 3

=== KIR Transformation ===
KIR Transformation

Live album by Merzbow + Achim Wollscheid
- Recorded: 1989 at KIR, Hamburg
- Length: 40:39
- Producers: Masami Akita, Achim Wollscheid

From a concert with Achim Wollscheid: first Merzbow played, then Wollscheid played using a recording of Merzbow's set, then Merzbow and Wollscheid played together.

All tracks are written by Masami Akita and Achim Wollscheid.

No.	Title	Length
1.	"KIR Transformation" (Merzbow + Achim Wollscheid)	40:39

==== Notes ====
- Edited by Achim Wollscheid, 1997

=== SCUM Vol. 1 ===
SCUM Vol. 1

Studio album by SCUM
- Recorded: May–December 1988 at ZSF Produkt Studio and various rehearsal studios
- Length: 59:55

SCUM was project to create new works out of previous Merzbow sessions using cut-ups, effects, and mixing. Name taken from the SCUM Manifesto. The track titles influenced by American post-war art. This was last LP record on ZSF Produkt.

All tracks are written by Masami Akita.

No.	Title	Length
1.	"Cockchola"	12:54
2.	"Extract 1"	4:21
3.	"Extract 2"	5:48
4.	"Extract 3"	1:18
5.	"Extract 4"	5:59
6.	"Kinetic Environment"	11:46
7.	"Yeah, But That Was Just Dyke Stuff / Great Nude Variation No. 2"	17:46

==== Notes ====
- Order of this CD is same as the original master tapes
- Tracks 2–5 previously unreleased
- All others from Scissors for Cutting Merzbow LP, ZSF Produkt, 1989

==== Personnel ====
- Masami Akita – electronics, tapes, bowed instruments, percussion, metal junks, motor, piano wires, noise generator, drums, guitar, radio
- Kiyoshi Mizutani – junks, effects on raw materials

=== SCUM Vol. 2 ===
SCUM Vol. 2

Studio album by SCUM
- Recorded: May–December 1988 at ZSF Produkt Studio and various rehearsal studios
- Length: 60:46

All tracks are written by Masami Akita.

No.	Title	Length
1.	"Music for Funk Arts No. 1" (long version)	22:51
2.	"Music for Funk Arts No. 2" (long version)	22:09
3.	"Great Nude Variation No. 1"	12:05
4.	"Extract 5"	3:40

==== Notes ====
- Order of this CD is same as the original master tapes
- Track 4 previously unreleased
- All others from Scissors for Cutting Merzbow LP, ZSF Produkt, 1989

==== Personnel ====
- Masami Akita – electronics, tapes, bowed instruments, percussion, metal junks, motor, piano wires, noise generator, guitar, electric shaver, radio, effects
- Kiyoshi Mizutani – guitar, junks, effects on raw materials

=== Severances ===
Severances

Studio album by SCUM
- Recorded: July 2, 1989 at ZSF Produkt Studio
- Length: 61:28

Includes two covers, "Deaf Forever" by Motörhead and the Jimi Hendrix version of "Wild Thing".

All tracks are written by Masami Akita.

No.	Title	Length
1.	"UP Steel CUM"	16:24
2.	"Catabolism Variation Stereo No. 1"	14:02
3.	"Deaf Forever / Wild Thing / Electric Shaver Forest / De-Soundtrack Variation No. 1 / Rap the Khabarovsk"	31:01

==== Notes ====
- Drum track of "Rap the Khabarovsk" was recorded live in Russia
- All tracks from Severances cassette, Discordia/Concordia, 1989

==== Personnel ====
- Masami Akita – tapes, turntables, electronix, drum kit, percussion, voice, metal percussion, bowed instruments, electro-shaver, motor, self-made junk
- Kiyoshi Mizutani – tape materials: guitar on tracks 1 and 3; keyboard, computer rhythm on track 2

=== Steel CUM ===
Steel CUM

Studio album by SCUM
- Recorded: 1989 at various locations
- Length: 56:36

The EP on Vertical Records was remixed and released without permission, with the cover made using one of Masami Akita's collages. "But a result of EP was fine. So, I'm agreed. But EP is still bootleg."

All tracks are written by Masami Akita.

No.	Title	Length
1.	"Mona"	2:51
2.	"Great Nude Variation No. 3"	5:57
3.	"Duck Exercise"	17:14
4.	"Blues in C Minor"	24:23
5.	"Body"	6:09

==== Notes ====
- Mixed at ZSF Produkt Studio 1989
- All tracks from Steel Cum cassette, ZSF Produkt, 1990
- Some parts appeared on Steel Cum 7″, Vertical, 1992

==== Personnel ====
- Masami Akita – guitar, drums, tapes, electronics, metal bowed instruments, feedback mixer, turntable
- Kiyoshi Mizutani – drums, guitar on some parts

=== Cloud Cock OO Grand ===
Cloud Cock OO Grand

Studio album by Merzbow
- Recorded: October 1989 – January 1990 at ZSF Produkt Studio
- Length: 78:58

During the European tour in 1989, Masami Akita could only bring simple equipment, and created a new live electronics style, different from his acoustical and tape based studio work, leading to the harsh noise Merzbow became known for in the 1990s. Cloud Cock OO Grand was the first example of this style, Merzbow's first digital recording, and the only CD on ZSF Produkt.

All tracks are written by Masami Akita.

No.	Title	Length
1.	"Brain Forest for Metal Acoustic Concret"	23:37
2.	"Spinnozaamen"	24:01
3.	"Autopussy Go No Go"	7:40
4.	"Modular"	15:12
5.	"Postfix"	8:26

==== Notes ====
- Mixed at ZSF Produkt Studio 17 April 1990
- Track 4 includes live recordings at V2, 's-Hertogenbosch, and Diogenes, Nijmegen, September 1989
- All tracks from Cloud Cock OO Grand CD, ZSF Produkt, 1990 [Note: "Postfix" is about five minutes longer here than on the original CD]

==== Personnel ====
- Masami Akita – tapes, noise electronics, metals, distorted DBX, turntable, loops, bowed instruments, metal harp, short wave
- Reiko Azuma – bowed instruments on track 4
- Peter Duimelinks – original live recordings

=== Newark Hellfire, Live at WFMU, USA ===
Newark Hellfire, Live at WFMU, USA

Live album by Merzbow
- Recorded: September 23, 1990 at WFMU Studio, New Jersey
- Length: 58:45

Radio session from Merzbow's first American tour.

No.	Title	Length
1.	"Newark Hellfire"	58:45

==== Notes ====
- Live recording by WFMU
- Remastered from original recording at ZSF Produkt Studio
- An excerpt appeared on Great American Nude / Crash for Hi-Fi CD, Alchemy, 1991

==== Personnel ====
- Masami Akita – feedback audio mixer, metals, electronics, electric shaver
- Reiko Azuma – metals, bowed instruments

=== Hannover Cloud ===
Hannover Cloud

Studio album by Merzbow
- Recorded: 1990 at ZSF Produkt Studio
- Length: 55:28

Features outtakes from Hannover Interruption and Cloud Cock OO Grand. "Rocket Bomber" uses raw materials from Sadomasochismo.

All tracks are written by Masami Akita.

No.	Title	Length
1.	"Magnetic Void"	20:35
2.	"Rocket Bomber"	15:17
3.	"Untitled Cock"	6:13
4.	"Autopussy Go No Go 2"	13:22

==== Notes ====
- Tracks 1–2 outtakes from Hannover Interruption LP, Dradomel, 1990
- Track 3 outtake from Cloud Cock OO Grand CD, ZSF Produkt, 1990
- Track 4 different mix appeared on Cloud Cock OO Grand

==== Personnel ====
- Masami Akita – noise electronics, metals, tapes

=== Stacy Q, Hi-Fi Sweet Leaf ===
Stacy Q, Hi-Fi Sweet Leaf

Studio album by Merzbow
- Recorded: April–May 1991 at ZSF Produkt Studio
- Length: 52:57

Originally made as raw material for "Crash for Hi-Fi", "Wing Over", and "Another Crash for High Tide". Includes the use of a scratched Cloud Cock OO Grand CD.

All tracks are written by Masami Akita.

No.	Title	Length
1.	"Decomposed Cockoo"	26:29
2.	"Stacy Q, Hi Fi Sweet Leaf"	26:28

==== Notes ====
- All tracks no editing

==== Personnel ====
- Masami Akita – noise electronics, tapes, scratched CD, radio, sound effect records, guitar

=== Music for True Romance Vol. 1 ===
Music for True Romance Vol. 1

Studio album by Merzbow
- Recorded: May 1992 – 1993 at ZSF Produkt Studio
- Length: 59:50

Backing tracks made for True Romance, a performance art project with Seido and Bara.

All tracks are written by Masami Akita.

No.	Title	Length
1.	"True Romance Theme"	3:52
2.	"Mystic Cave"	2:27
3.	"She Floating-Preparation"	15:43
4.	"She Mutilation-Main Ritual"	15:17
5.	"Injured Emperial Soldiers Marching Song"	22:29

==== Notes ====
- Tracks 1–4 made for Blood Orgy of the She Dolls soundtrack, 1992
- Track 5 made for "Isis and Secret Army Hyper Vivisection" performance at MOMA, Kyoto, 1993

==== Personnel ====
- Masami Akita – tapes, electronics, disks

=== Brain Ticket Death ===
Brain Ticket Death

Studio album by Merzbow
- Recorded: 1993 at ZSF Produkt Studio
- Length: 49:56

Track 4 samples Brainticket's self-titled song from their album Cottonwoodhill. It's also a reference to Nurse with Wound, who used the same bit on Brained by Falling Masonry.

All tracks are written by Masami Akita.

No.	Title	Length
1.	"Metal of Doom"	6:36
2.	"Electric Peekaboo"	3:45
3.	"Iron Caravan"	5:33
4.	"Brain Ticket Death"	34:01

==== Personnel ====
- Masami Akita – noise electronics, metals, turntable, bass, guitar

=== Sons of Slash Noise Metal ===
Sons of Slash Noise Metal

Studio album by Merzbow
- Recorded: 1992, February – March 1993 at ZSF Produkt Studio
- Length: 60:25

Tracks 1 and 3 were made as raw material for recordings of the same period. Track 2 is a remix of a fragment.

All tracks are written by Masami Akita.

No.	Title	Length
1.	"In-A-Gadda-Da-Veddah"	16:53
2.	"Cross Toad"	10:57
3.	"Slash Embryo"	32:34

==== Notes ====
- All tracks remastered from original mother tape, no editing

==== Personnel ====
- Masami Akita – metals, noise electronics, scratched CD, radio, tapes

=== Exotic Apple ===
Exotic Apple

Studio album by Merzbow
- Recorded: 1992–1994 at ZSF Produkt Studio
- Length: 61:45

Includes Arthur Lyman samples. Yuuri Sunohara is a director, producer, model etc. for Kinbiken/Right Brain. "Apple Rock" includes unused material originally made for Flying Testicle.

All tracks are written by Masami Akita.

No.	Title	Length
1.	"Sunohara Youri Is Suzanna Erica"	10:16
2.	"Moon Over the Bwana A"	5:30
3.	"Apple Rock 1"	14:20
4.	"Apple Rock 2"	16:17
5.	"Apple Rock 3"	7:23
6.	"Apple Rock 4"	7:55

==== Notes ====
- Track 1 from Melt compilation, Work In Progress, 1992
- Track 2 from Land of the Rising Noise compilation, Charnel House, 1993

==== Personnel ====
- Masami Akita – tapes, noise electronix, metals, guitar, EMS Synthi A, Roland TR-606

=== Liquid City ===
Liquid City

Studio album by Merzbow
- Recorded: December 1994 – January 1995 at ZSF Produkt Studio
- Length: 57:12

Originally intended to be part of a CD+CD-ROM called Scatologic Baroque, but it was canceled. The material for the CD-ROM was used for the book Anal Baroque. Part of the "World Trilogy" with Magnesia Nova and Green Wheels. "Liquid City 17-1-95" was recorded on the same day as the Great Hanshin earthquake. "Tiabguls" is a Throbbing Gristle tribute.

All tracks are written by Masami Akita.

No.	Title	Length
1.	"Liquid City 17-1-95"	19:11
2.	"Dalitech Filters"	21:09
3.	"Tiabguls"	9:16
4.	"Cheese Car Commando"	7:35

==== Notes ====
- Track 3 from Entertainment Through Pain compilation, RRRecords, 1995

==== Personnel ====
- Masami Akita – noise electronics, metals, EMS, voice

=== Red Magnesia Pink ===
Red Magnesia Pink

Studio album by Merzbow
- Recorded: April–August 1995 at ZSF Produkt Studio
- Length: 61:20

Outtakes from Red 2 Eyes, Magnesia Nova, and Pinkream.

All tracks are written by Masami Akita.

No.	Title	Length
1.	"Minus Zero"	5:57
2.	"Etic"	4:08
3.	"Delta X"	4:33
4.	"Tremolo Man"	10:27
5.	"Euclids Pickel"	13:48
6.	"Chameleon Body"	9:18
7.	"Little Bang!"	7:38
8.	"You-Bahn"	5:27

==== Personnel ====
- Masami Akita – EMS Synthi 'A', noise electronics, metal, filters, voice

=== Marfan Syndrome ===
Marfan Syndrome

Studio album by Merzbow
- Recorded: September 1994 – January 1995 at ZSF Produkt Studio
- Length: 51:51

"Marfan Syndrome for Blue" is Akita's first track to use the EMS synthesiser. Track 2 is a reference to Claes Oldenburg, who creates oversized sculptures of everyday objects, including soft sculptures.

All tracks are written by Masami Akita.

No.	Title	Length
1.	"Marfan Syndrome for Blue" (remix)	7:07
2.	"Oldenbergs Soft Gun"	18:39
3.	"Spider Nest Castle Pt. 1"	12:26
4.	"Un Br Che"	11:25
5.	"Yosef Voice"	2:12

==== Notes ====
- Track 1 appeared with different mix on Eternal Blue Extreme compilation, Somnus, 1994
- Track 4 appeared edited on Coruscanto by Reiko Azuma, Nekoisis, 1995
- All others previously unreleased

==== Personnel ====
- Masami Akita – noise electronics, EMS, Synare 3, metals, rubber bass guitar, telephone signal, tape, voice
- Reiko Azuma – voice on tracks 1 and 5

=== Rhinogradentia ===
Rhinogradentia

Studio album by Merzbow
- Recorded: 1995–1996 at ZSF Produkt Studio
- Length: 55:36

Named after a fictitious order of mammals. Masami Akita performed solo twice as Zecken, playing this style.

All tracks are written by Masami Akita.

No.	Title	Length
1.	"Rhinogradentia"	14:52
2.	"Silver Scintillator"	16:41
3.	"Narco"	24:02

==== Notes ====
- Remixed in 1997

==== Personnel ====
- Masami Akita – noise electronics, EMS, audio generator, filters

=== Space Mix Travelling Band ===
Space Mix Travelling Band

Studio album by Merzbow
- Recorded: 1994–1997
- Length: 59:03

Tracks 1–2 are based on four channel tape: two channels recorded in 1994 and used on tracks of the same period, and two channels of EMS recorded in 1996. Additional EMS and Moog overdub and final mix in 1997.

All tracks are written by Masami Akita.

No.	Title	Length
1.	"Travelling 1997"	20:04
2.	"Floating Manhattan"	14:06
3.	"Hongkong Suite"	24:52

==== Notes ====
- Raw materials of tracks recorded during 1994–1996
- Track 3 different mix used as raw material for Brisbane–Tokyo Interlace with John Watermann, Cold Spring, 1996

==== Personnel ====
- Masami Akita – noise electronics, EMS, Moog, metals, voice, tapes

=== Motorond ===
Motorond

Live album / Studio album by Merzbow
- Recorded: January 1997 at ZSF Produkt Studio and March 30, 1997 at Guilty, Tokyo
- Length: 59:18

Track 1 was the most recent live performance when the Merzbox was compiled.

No.	Title	Length
1.	"Motorond Pt. 2"	31:25
2.	"Motorond Pt. 1"	27:53

==== Notes ====
- All remixed at ZSF Produkt Studio, April 1997
- Track 2 last 10 minutes appeared on Non Stop Noise Party, Hond in de Goot, 2000

==== Personnel ====
- Masami Akita – noise electronics, Novation Bass Station, metals, pressure pedal
- Bara – voice

=== Annihiloscillator ===
Annihiloscillator

Studio album by Merzbow
- Recorded: December 1996 – March 1997 at ZSF Produkt Studio
- Length: 60:17

Selection of recent tracks when the Merzbox was compiled. Track 3 is a reference to Marguerite Yourcenar's Dark Brain of Piranesi, an essay about Giovanni Battista Piranesi's Carceri prints.

All tracks are written by Masami Akita.

No.	Title	Length
1.	"Hair Gun"	13:16
2.	"Kyoko Hamuras Air Clyster"	12:14
3.	"Black Brain of Piranese"	13:26
4.	"Soft Parts 1 & 2"	17:29
5.	"Wild Pair"	3:50

==== Notes ====
- Raw material for track 2 recorded live in California, 1995
- Track 4 appeared on Merzbow/Kadef split 10″, Dreizehn, 1997

==== Personnel ====
- Masami Akita – metal, noise electronix, EMS on tracks 1–2, Theremin on tracks 1–4, Moog on track 4
- Reiko Azuma – noise on track 2
- Bara – voice on track 2
