= Keiji Haino =

Japanese musician

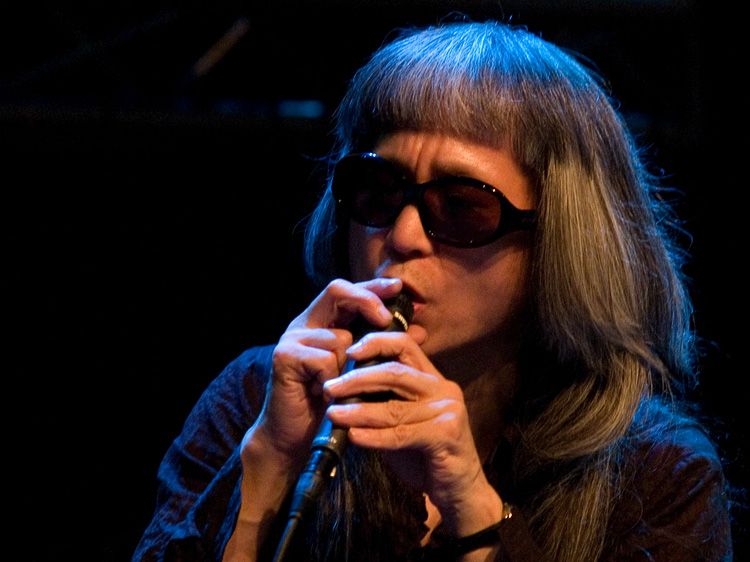

Background information
- Born: May 3, 1952 (age 73)
- Origin: Chiba, Japan
- Genres: Rock free improvisation noise music percussion psychedelic music minimalism drone music experimental
- Years active: 1970s–present
- Label: Table of the Elements
- Website: Keiji Haino

Keiji Haino (灰野 敬二 Haino Keiji; born May 3, 1952) is a Japanese musician and singer-songwriter whose work has included rock, free improvisation, noise music, percussion, psychedelic music, minimalism and drone music. He has been active since the 1970s and continues to record regularly and in new styles.

== History ==
Haino's initial artistic outlet was theatre, inspired by the radical writings of Antonin Artaud. An epiphanic moment came when he heard The Doors' "When The Music's Over" and changed course towards music. After brief stints in a number of blues and experimental outfits, he formed improvisational rock band Lost Aaraaf in 1970. In the mid 1970s, having left Lost Aaraaf, he collaborated with psychedelic multi-instrumentalist Magical Power Mako.

His musical output throughout the late 1970s is scarcely documented, that is until the formation of his rock duo Fushitsusha in 1978 (although their first LP did not surface until 1989). This outfit initially consisted of Haino on guitar and vocals, and Tamio Shiraishi on synthesizer. With the departure of Shiraishi and the addition of Jun Hamano (bass) and Shuhei Takashima (drums), Fushitsusha operated as a trio. The lineup soon changed, with Yasushi Ozawa (bass) and Jun Kosugi (drums) performing throughout the 1990s, but returned to a duo with Haino supplementing percussion with tape-loops.

Haino formed Aihiyo in 1998, principally playing a diverse range of covers (including The Rolling Stones, The Ronettes, and the Jimi Hendrix Experience), transforming the original material into Haino's unique form of garage psychedelia.

NHK, Japan's national broadcaster, banned him from broadcast from 1973 to 2013.

Other groups Haino has formed include Vajra (with underground folk singer Kan Mikami and drummer Toshiaki Ishizuka), Knead (with the avant-prog outfit Ruins), Sanhedolin (with Yoshida Tatsuya of Ruins and Mitsuru Nasuno of Korekyojinn, Altered States and Ground Zero) and a solo project called Nijiumu. He has also collaborated with many artists, including Faust, Boris, Derek Bailey, Joey Baron, Peter Brötzmann, Lee Konitz, Loren Mazzacane Connors, Charles Gayle, Earl Kuck, Bill Laswell, Musica Transonic, Stephen O'Malley, Makigami Koichi, Ayuo, Merzbow, Oren Ambarchi, Jim O'Rourke, John Zorn, Yamantaka Eye, John Duncan, Fred Frith, Charles Hayward and John Butcher.

In 2025, a Haino concert scheduled to take place at Metz's Saint-Étienne Cathedral was moved to the Centre Pompidou-Metz following a mobilization of traditionalist Catholic movements, including banned far-right organization Civitas.

== Style ==
His main instruments of choice have been guitar and vocals, with many other instruments and approaches incorporated into his career's work. Haino is known for intensely cathartic sound explorations, and despite the fact that much of his work contains varied instrumentation and accompaniment, he retains a distinctive style.

Haino cites a broad range of influences, including troubadour music, Marlene Dietrich, Iannis Xenakis, Blue Cheer, Syd Barrett, and Charlie Parker. At a young age, he had an epiphany through his introduction to The Doors. His recent foray into DJing at Tokyo nightclubs has reportedly reflected his eclectic taste. He has had a long love affair with early blues music, particularly the works of Blind Lemon Jefferson, and is heavily inspired by the Japanese musical concept of "Ma", the silent spaces in music (see Taiko for more information). In a 2012 interview with Time Out Tokyo, he described his approach as "defying the notion that you can't create something from nothing." He also has a keen interest in Butoh dancing and collecting ethnic instruments.

Haino's lifestyle: he has had the same long hair, black clothes and sunglasses throughout his career, and is a strict vegetarian.

== Discography ==
=== Solo albums ===
Date	Album name	Label/catalogue number	Notes
1981-06-01	Watashi dake? (わたしだけ?, "Only Me?")	Pinakotheca PRL#2	
1990-10-25	Nijiumu (滲有無, "Infiltration")	P.S.F. Records PSF-7	
1992	Itsukushimi (慈, "Affection")	P.S.F. Records PSF-23	Recorded live on 1991-12-30.
1994	Beginning and End, Interwoven		
1994	I Said, This Is the Son of Nihilism		
1995	Tenshi No Gijinka		
1995	The 21st Century Hard-y-Guide-y Man		
1997	So, Black Is Myself		
1997	Keeping on Breathing		
1998-06-24	The 21st Century Hard-y-Guide-y Man (Even Now, Still I Think)	J-Factory TKCF-77023	
2001	Abandon All Words at a Stroke, So That Prayer Can Come Spilling Out		
2002	To Start With, Let's Remove the Colour!!		
2003	Light Darkness Melting Into One This Vibration		
2004	Black Blues (acoustic and electric versions)		
2005	Tangled Up in the Universe, My Pain''		
2005	Global Ancient Atmosphere		
2006	やらないが できないことに なってゆく		
2008	The 21st Century Hard-y-Guide-y Man: こいつから失せたいためのはかりごと		
2011	Un autre chemin vers l'Ultime		

- Kaii Abe (collaboration with unknown musicians) (1982)
- Live in the first year of the Heisei, Volume One (with Kan Mikami and Motoharu Yoshizawa (1990)
- Live in the first year of the Heisei, Volume Two (with Kan Mikami and Motoharu Yoshizawa (1990)
- Live at Lazyways, Koenji, Tokyo (with Toshi Ishizuka) (1992)
- <live> 30 – June – 1992 (1992)
- Execration that accept to acknowledge (1993)
- Ama No Gawa (Milky Way) (1993)
- Guitar Works (7")(1994)
- Hikari=Shi" (light=death) (Maki Miura, Keiji Haino, and Ogreish Organism) (1994)
- Two strings will do it (Barre Phillips, Keiji Haino, and Sabu Toyozumi) (1994)
- Live at Downtown Music Gallery (Keiji Haino and Loren Mazzacane Connors) (1995)
- A Challenge to Fate (1995, reissued 2004)
- Tenshi No Gijinka (1995)
- I said, This is the son of nihilism (1995)
- Twenty-first Century Hard-y Guide-y Man (1995)
- Etchings in the air (Barre Phillips and Keiji Haino) (1996)
- Evolving Blush or Driving Original Sin (with Peter Brötzmann) (1996)
- Gerry Miles (with Alan Licht) (1996)
- The Book of "Eternity Set Aflame" (1996)
- Saying I love you, I continue to curse myself (1996)
- Drawing Close, Attuning—The Respective Signs of Order and Chaos (with Derek Bailey) (1997)
- Vol. 2 (Keiji Haino and Loren Mazza Cane Connors) (1997)
- Keeping on breathing (April 21, 1997)
- Sruthi Box (promotional release) (April 21, 1997)
- So, black is myself (May 1, 1997)
- The 21st Century Hard-y Guide-y Man (1998)
- Incubation (with Musica Transonic) (1998)
- Black: Implication Flooding (with Boris) (1998)
- Even Now, Still I Think (June 24, 1998)
- An Unclear Trial: More Than This (with Greg Cohen and Joey Baron) (November 1998/January 1999)
- Y (with Jean-Francois Pauvros) (January 2000)
- The Strange Face (with Shoji Hano) (September 2000)
- Shadow – Live in Wels, Austria (with Shoji Hano and Peter Brötzmann) (September 2000)
- Ichioku to ichibanme no inori o michibiki daseba ii (with Coa) (October 2000) - translation: You should draw out the billion and first prayer
- Songs (with Derek Bailey) (December 2000)
- Abandon all words at a stroke, so that prayer can come spilling out (May 2001)
- Until Water Grasps Flame (with Yoshida Tatsuya) (January 2002)
- Mazu wa iro o nakusouka!! (November 5, 2002)
- Free Rock (Doo-Dooettes + Keiji Haino + Rick Potts) (November 25, 2002)
- "C'est parfait" endoctriné tu tombes la tête la première (January 2003)
- Hikari yami uchitokeaishi kono hibiki (December 24, 2003)
- Koko (December 24, 2003)
- Live at Cafe Independents Friday 23. January. 2004 (Keiji Haino, Tatsuya Yoshida & Mitsuru Natsuno + Bus Ratch) (June 2004)
- Tayu tayu to tadayoitamae kono furue (with Michihiro Sato) (July 2004)
- Next Let's Try Changing the Shape (April 2004, January 2005)
- Black Blues (soft version) (May 2004)
- Black Blues (violent version) (May 2004)
- Uchu Ni Karami Tsuite Iru Waga Itami (March 10, 2005)
- kono kehai fujirareteru hajimarini (August 25, 2005)
- Reveal'd to none as yet – an expedience to utterly vanish consciousness while still alive (December 2005)
- New Rap (with Yoshida Tatsuya) (March 2006)
- Homeogryllus japonicus Orchestra 2004 (with Mamoru Fujieda) (April 2006)
- Animamima (with Sitaar Tah!) (May 2006)
- Yaranai ga dekinai ni natte yuku (August 15, 2006)
- Mamono (with KK Null) (November 2006)
- Cosmic Debris, Vol.III (with My Cat Is An Alien) (August 2007)
- Uhrfasudhasdd (with Yoshida Tatsuya) (May 2008)
- Pulverized Purple (with Masami Akita) (July 2008)
- Imikuzushi (with Jim O'Rourke and Oren Ambarchi) (2012)
- Nazoranai (with Oren Ambarchi and Stephen O'Malley) (2012)
- Now While It's Still Warm Let Us Pour in All The Mystery (with Jim O'Rourke and Oren Ambarchi) (2013)
- Only Wanting to Melt Beautifully Away... (with Jim O'Rourke and Oren Ambarchi) (2014)
- An Untroublesome Defencelessness (with Merzbow and Balázs Pándi) (2016)
- Light Never Bright Enough (with John Butcher) (CD/LP 2017)
- American Dollar Bill – Keep Facing Sideways, You're Too Hideous to Look at Face On (with Sumac) (2018)
- The intellect given birth to here (eternity) is too young (2022) (with Peter Brötzmann)
- Into This Juvenile Apocalypse Our Golden Blood to Pour Let Us Never (with Sumac) (2022)

=== Vajra ===
- Tsugaru (1995)
- Chiru-Ha/Ozakijinjya (CD-single) (1995)
- Ring (1996)
- "Sichisiki" (The Seventh Consciousness) (1997)
- Sravaka (1998)
- Mandala Cat Last (2002)
- Live 2007 (2007)

=== Aihiyo ===
- untitled (1998)
- Second Album (2000)

=== Black stage ===
- untitled (with Natsuki Kido & Yuji Katsui) (1996)

=== Purple Trap ===
- Soul's True Love (4CD) (1995)
- Decided... Already The Motionless Heart of Tranquility, Tangling The Prayer Called "I" (1999)

=== Knead ===
- 1st (May 2002)
- This melting happiness – I want you to realize that it is another trap (July 2003)

=== Sanhedorin ===
- Manjoicchi wa muko (August 10, 2005)
- Sukino Godaburyu Ichieichi (December 25, 2013)

=== Lost Aaraaff ===
- untitled (1991)

=== Nijiumu ===
- Era of Sad Wings (1993)
- Live (part of Driftworks 4 CD box-set)
