= Édith Canat de Chizy =

French composer

Edith Canat de Chizy (born 26 March 1950) is a French composer, born in Lyon and now based in Paris. She was the first female composer to be elected a member of the Académie des Beaux-Arts.

== Life and career ==
Edith Canat de Chizy was born in Lyon, France on 26 March 1950, and studied art, archeology and philosophy at the Sorbonne University in Paris in parallel with music at the Paris Conservatoire with Maurice Ohana - an important influence - and Ivo Malec. She continued her studies at the Paris Conservatoire, where she obtained first prizes in harmony, fugue, counterpoint, analysis, orchestration and composition. She also studied electroacoustics and worked with Guy Reibel at the Groupe de Recherches Musicales. Her instrument is the violin, and she has written extensively for string instruments.

After completing her studies, Canat de Chizy worked as a music educator, becoming the director of the Erik Satie conservatory in the 7th arrondissement of Paris until 2006 when she joined the staff of the Regional Conservatory of Paris (CRR de Paris) where she teaches composition. She was elected a member of the Académie des Beaux-Arts of Paris in 2005.

Many of her works are state commissions, written for ensembles including the virtuoso vocal ensemble Musicatreize directed by Roland Hayrabedian, IRCAM, French Radio Philharmonic Orchestra and the national orchestras based in Paris and Lyon. Her music is published by Editions Henry Lemoine.

She is co-author with François Porcile of a book on Maurice Ohana published by Fayard in 2005.

== Honours and awards ==
- SACEM Great Symphonic Prize (2004)
- Tribune Internationale des Compositeurs Prize (1990)
- SACEM Hervé Dugardin prize (1987)
- Georges Enesco prize (1990)
- Paul-Louis Weiller prize (1992)
- SACD “Jeune talent musique” Prize (1998)
- Exceptional distinction, Prince Pierre de Monaco competition (1999)
- Chevalier des Arts et Lettres (1994)
- Nominated at the Victoires de la Musique (2000)
- Prix du Président de la République (2016), lifetime achievement award

=== Orchestral works ===
- Yell (1985)
- Siloël (string orchestra, 1992)
- De Noche (1993)
- Exultet (violin concerto, 1995)
- Moïra (cello concerto, 1998)
- Lands Away (concerto for cimbalom and string orchestra, 1999)
- Alio (2002)
- Nedjma (2003)
- Intrada La septième trompette (2004)
- La Ligne d'ombre (2005)
- Les Rayons du jour (viola concerto, 2005)
- Omen (2006)
- Deux (2009)
- Times (2009)
- Pierre d'éclair (2010)
- Drift (clarinet concerto, 2013)
- Front de l'Aube (2017)

=== Works for large ensemble ===
- Luceat (for 10 violins, 1985)
- Vagues se brisant contre le vent (flute and ensemble, 2006)
- La Maison du Miroir (string ensemble, 2007)
- Pluie, vapeur, vitesse (2008)

=== Chamber music ===
- Sextuor à cordes (2 violins, 2 violas, 2 cellos, 1982)
- Nyx (versions for 3 violins, for 3 violas and for 3 cellos, 1984)
- Saxy (alto saxophone in E flat and piano), 1985
- Black Light (oboe, viola, double bass and piano, 1986)
- Kyoran (quintet, 1987)
- Appels (quintet, 1989)
- Hallel (string trio, 1991)
- Alphaï (quintet, 1993)
- Estampes (piano and 4 percussionists, 1997)
- Tiempo (string trio, 1999)
- Moving (string trio, 2001)
- Vivere (string quartet, 2001)
- Alive (string quartet, 2003)
- Falaises (string quartet with principal cello, 2003)
- Wild (viola and cello, 2003)
- En bleu et or (viola and piano, 2005)
- Dance (violin and vibraphone, 2006)
- Burning (clarinet, piano, violin and cello, 2007)
- Trance (harpsichord, cimbalom and percussion, 2009)
- Proche invisible (String Quartet no. 3, 2010)

=== Works for solo instrument ===
- Tlaloc (percussion solo, 1984)
- Mobiles immobiles (piano, 1997)
- Danse de l'aube (double bass, 1998)
- Véga (organ, 1999)
- Irisations (violin, 1999)
- Formes du vent (cello, 2003)
- En mille éclats (violin, 2009)
- Prélude au silence (piano, 2010)
- Pour une âme errante (organ, 2011)

=== Works with electronics ===
- Le Vol blanc (2 violins, 2010)
- Over the sea (accordion and string trio, 2012)

=== Vocal works ===
- Litanie (mezzo-soprano and flute, 1982)
- Llama (SATB choir, 1986)
- Canciones (12 solo voices, 1992)
- Le Tombeau de Gilles de Rais (lyric drama in a prologue and three tableaux, 1993)
- Messe de l'Ascension (soprano, choir and ensemble, 1996)
- Exil (6 solo voices and 6 cellos, 2000)
- Ode à Purcell (8 voices and ensemble, 2001)
- To Gather Paradise (a cappella mixed choir, 2001)
- Clair et Noir (12 solo voices, harpsichord and percussion, 2002)
- Berceuse - Mon âme est en peine (soprano, choir and orchestre, 2003)
- La Sorcière de Jasmin (reciter, mixed choir and ensemble, 2004)
- Dios (a cappella chamber choir, 2005)
- La Chanson des orphelins (children's choir, 2005)
- Quatrains (12 solo voices, 2005)
- Corazon Loco (8 voices and percussion, 2006)
- Suite de la nuit (a cappella choir or children's choir and ad lib string sextet, 2006)
- Vuelvete (6 a cappella voices, 2006)
- Dancing in the wind (double choir, 2007)
- Heaven (12 solo voices and saxophone quartet, 2007)
- Livre d'Heures (2007)
- P'oasis (children's choir, flute, clarinet and vibraphone, 2007)
- Prière de Christophe Colomb (4 male voices, reciter and piano, 2008)
- A song of joys (mixed choir and orchestra, 2008)
- L'Invisible (12 female voices and trompet, 2012)
- Duerme (12 solo voices and percussion, 2013)
- Sombra (3 female voices and viola, 2013)
- As a blues (arrangement of Corazon Loco for soprano and ensemble, 2015)
- Blues (extract of Corazon Loco for 8 voices and percussion, 2015)
- Voilé, dévoilé (soprano and orchestre, 2015)
