= Cuts of Guilt, Cuts Deeper =

Studio album by Merzbow, Balázs Pándi, Mats Gustafsson, and Thurston Moore
- Released: March 24, 2015
- Studio: The Park (Wembley, London)
- Genre: Free improvisation; noise
- Length: 81:54
- Label: RareNoise
- Producer: Cuts; Daniel Sandor

Cuts chronology
| Cuts (2013) | Cuts of Guilt, Cuts Deeper (2015) | Cuts Up, Cuts Out (2018) |

Cuts of Guilt, Cuts Deeper is a collaborative studio album by Japanese noise artist Merzbow, Hungarian drummer Balázs Pándi, Swedish woodwind musician Mats Gustafsson, and American guitarist Thurston Moore. Released as a double album on March 24, 2015, through RareNoiseRecords, it follows 2013's Cuts as the second "Cuts" record, now with Moore as part of the lineup. Cuts of Guilt... was recorded in a single day inside an indoor skate park in Wembley, London, and it was met with positive reception upon release.

== Background and recording ==
In 2013, the trio of Merzbow (Masami Akita), Balázs Pándi, and Mats Gustafsson released the collaborative album Cuts. Later, Pándi performed with Thurston Moore during the All Tomorrow's Parties Festival in London, and while talking backstage, Moore asked if he could join the trio for an upcoming gig. Moore had previously worked with both Merzbow and Gustafsson on the Sonic Youth album SYR8: Andre Sider Af Sonic Youth (2008). Though Moore was ultimately unavailable for that gig, the four musicians were able to convene the day before to record together.

According to Daniel Sandor, the album's recording engineer, much of his job was to search for a large studio with decent acoustics that would most likely make an impression on Merzbow. After scouting out twenty potential locations, Sandor decided on The Park Studios in Wembley, London. While he found the studio itself typical, the building was attached to an indoor skate park that had an acoustic quality he thought was reminiscent of an airplane hangar. With the studio's in-house engineer, they set up equipment in the skate park on the day of recording before each musician arrived. Altogether, the sessions lasted for four or five hours in four individual parts as long as an hour and ten minutes.

== Composition ==
Cuts of Guilt... is a free improvisational record consisting of four long-form noise music tracks. In terms of the instrumentation, Merzbow and Gustafsson both contributed to the album's electronic components, with Gustafsson also adding woodwinds such as the saxophone on "Replaced by Shame – Only Two Left". Moore played the guitar, and Pándi provided the drum parts, frequently utilizing polyrhythm.

== Release ==
Cuts of Guilt, Cuts Deeper was released on March 24, 2015, through RareNoiseRecords, available on CD, vinyl, and download formats. Physical editions of the record contain two discs, each consisting of two tracks. A live album of the quartet, entitled Cuts Up, Cuts Out, followed in 2018.

== Critical reception ==
Professional ratings
Review scores
| Source | Rating |
|---|---|
| All About Jazz | 4.5/5 stars |
| Jazzwise | 3/5 stars |
| Mojo | 4/5 stars |
| PopMatters | 8/10 |
| Tom Hull – on the Web | B+(***) |

Rating Cuts of Guilt, Cuts Deeper four-and-a-half stars out of five, Mark Corroto of All About Jazz complimented the quartet for "dial[ing] back their extroverted nature in service of the music." He compared the album to John Coltrane's Ascension and Ornette Coleman's Free Jazz and said, like those records, listeners benefit from being able to process the music either as a whole or by focusing on a specific musician. Dom Lawson of Prog said that whereas Merzbow's solo records are "often inpenetrable", on Cuts of Guilt..., "he sounds liberated by the lateral improvisational arcs pursued by his collaborators."

In an eight out of ten review for PopMatters, Devon Fisher called Pándi "the undeniable backbone" of the record, arguing that his drumming prevented the music from becoming "lost in formlessness"; as their sole point of criticism, they questioned Gustafsson's choice to often opt for electronics instead of the usual brass and woodwinds. Fisher also thought that in comparison to the album's predecessor, Moore's textural guitar playing made it a "significant improvement". Commenting on Moore's newfound presence as well, Spencer Grady of Jazzwise opined that he "acts as something of an emancipator" for the others, providing supplemental assistance for Merzbow's electronics and enabling Gustafsson to "issu[e] post-fire radicals from his sax like a sperm whale spouting sprays of molten pumice." Grady concluded their three-star review by saying that even if the record is often lacking in surprises, their "dedication, determination and energy ... simply has to be admired."

Rolling Stone ranked Cuts of Guilt, Cuts Deeper at no. 20 on the year-end list "20 Best Avant Albums of 2015".

== Track listing ==
All tracks are written by Masami Akita, Mats Gustafsson, Thurston Moore, and Balázs Pándi.

Cuts of Guilt, Cuts Deeper track listing
| No. | Title | Length |
|---|---|---|
| 1. | "Replaced by Shame – Only Two Left" | 19:46 |
| 2. | "Divided by Steel. Falling Gracefully." | 17:42 |
| 3. | "Too Late. Too Sharp – It Is Over" | 21:04 |
| 4. | "All His Teeth in Hand, Asking Her Once More" | 23:22 |
| Total length: | | 81:54 |

== Personnel ==
Credits are adapted from the CD liner notes.

=== Musicians ===
- Masami Akita – noise electronics
- Mats Gustafsson – reeds and live electronics
- Thurston Moore – electric guitar
- Balázs Pándi – drums

=== Technical and design ===
- Cuts – production
- Daniel Sandor – production; recording at The Park Studios (London); mixing at Cirque Ambulante (London)
- Jonas Ritter – engineering assistance
- James Plotkin – mastering
- Rok – artwork and design
