= Tenshi No Gijinka =

Studio album by Keiji Haino
- Released: 1995
- Genre: Experimental
- Length: 55:35
- Label: Tzadik

Keiji Haino chronology
Suite Reverberation (1995)	Tenshi No Gijinka (1995)	The Third Heart (1995)

Tenshi No Gijinka is an album by Japanese musician Keiji Haino, released on John Zorn's Tzadik label in 1995. The album features nine untitled pieces, consisting of Haino's voice and percussion.

== Reception ==
Professional ratings
Review scores
Source	Rating
AllMusic	4/5 stars

In a review for AllMusic, Joslyn Layne wrote: "Focusing entirely on percussion and vocals, Haino builds a unique, meditative space out of drones, cymbal smacks, rings, and reverberations. Bizarre yet also beautiful, Haino creates a personalized and esoteric ritual that alternately serves as repeated tension release and representation of the inner sounds of existence. The result is a captivating immersion in sustains and overtone."

Writing for Red Bull Music Academy, Jon Dale commented: "The nakedness of much of this music, combined with the processional movement of some of the drums, gives Tenshi No Gijinka a particularly abstracted, ritualistic tenor: with Haino's best albums, you’re relocated to another zone of experience."

== Track listing ==
No.	Title	Length
1.	"Untitled"	4:33
2.	"Untitled"	11:35
3.	"Untitled"	2:25
4.	"Untitled"	5:33
5.	"Untitled"	9:27
6.	"Untitled"	3:48
7.	"Untitled"	4:23
8.	"Untitled"	9:28
9.	"Untitled"	4:23
