= Pulse Demon =

Studio album by Merzbow
- Released: May 28, 1996
- Recorded: October–November 1995
- Studio: ZSF Produkt Studio, Tokyo, Japan
- Genre: Noise
- Length: 73:20
- Label: Relapse Records
- Producer: Masami Akita

Merzbow chronology
Music for Bondage Performance 2 (1996)	Pulse Demon (1996)	Spiral Honey (1996)

Professional ratings
Review scores
Source	Rating
AllMusic	2.5/5 stars
Pitchfork	8.7/10

Pulse Demon is a studio album by the Japanese noise musician Merzbow, released 28 May 1996. The album was reissued on vinyl in May 2018 by Bludhoney Records, and again in November 2019 by Relapse, with a bonus track.

== Background ==
The holographic, shiny silver artwork is a homage to the 1970s Prospective 21e Siècle imprint of Philips Records, in particular the albums of Ivo Malec. However, the art is most similar to the work of Bridget Riley, "Fall" and "Current" in particular.

Basically, this shiny silver is the color of Heavy Metal. I mean it the way William Burroughs said it. My basic idea is I think this idea has been approached in the past by Heldon and King Crimson.

— Masami Akita

The title was inspired by the 1970s afro-rock band Demon Fuzz and Akita's use of a fuzz box as a pulse generator. Some song titles were inspired by Jon Appleton's Appleton Syntonic Menagerie LP.

== Reception ==
Critical reaction to Pulse Demon was mixed. Pitchfork gave the album's 2003 re-release a score of 8.7/10, their highest rating out of their eight reviews of Merzbow albums. Calling it an "incomparable classic", the reviewer describes the album as "simply pure sound, viciously unadulterated static", going on to state that "music cannot get much more extreme than this. Maybe John Cage's 4′33″, and that's so far to the limit, it's probably cheating. This is the edge of music, of sound in general." Also praised was the album's packaging, being called "more valuable than some people's lives." However, AllMusic's dismissive two-line review from Jason Ankeny simply said "Merzbow's second American release offers more of the deafening white noise that is his trademark, mastered for maximum loudness. Not for the faint of heart, but ideally suited for the hard of hearing." Being given only 2.5/5 stars, Pulse Demon is one of the four lowest rated of AllMusic's 31 (solo) Merzbow reviews. The A.V. Club, in their review, described the album as "genuinely extreme, downright torturous sounds that are strangely compelling in their shredding intensity."

== Track listing ==
=== Original version ===
All music is composed by Masami Akita.

CD track listing
No.	Title	Length
1.	"Woodpecker No. 1"	6:42
2.	"Woodpecker No. 2"	3:37
3.	"Spiral Blast"	4:30
4.	"My Station Rock"	4:54
5.	"Ultra Marine Blues"	11:29
6.	"Tokyo Times Ten"	11:09
7.	"Worms Plastic Earthbound"	24:53
8.	"Yellow Hyper Balls"	6:03

=== Remastered version ===
Side one
No.	Title	Length
1.	"Woodpecker No. 1"	6:43
2.	"Woodpecker No. 2"	3:37
3.	"Spiral Blast"	4:30
4.	"My Station Rock"	4:54

Side two
No.	Title	Length
1.	"Ultra Marine Blues"	11:29
2.	"Yellow Hyper Balls"	6:03

Side three
No.	Title	Length
1.	"Tokyo Times Ten"	11:08
2.	"Extract 1" (bonus track)	5:01

Side four
No.	Title	Length
1.	"Worms Plastic Earthbound"	24:52

== Notes ==
- All composed by live noise concrete. No over dub.
- Mastered at SAE Mastering, Phoenix, AZ, January 1996.

== Personnel ==
- Masami Akita – metals, EMS, audio generator, shortwave, noise electronics, tape, voice
- Colour Climax – visual
- Bill Yurkiewicz & David Shirk – mastering

== Release history ==
Release history and formats for Pulse Demon
Region	Date	Label	Format	Quantity	Catalog	Notes
United States	1996	Release	CD	3,000	RR 6937-2	Holographic sleeve
United States	1998	Release	CD	unknown	RR 6937-2	Jewel case
United States	May 11, 2018	Bludhoney	2×LP	500	BLUD-20	Colored vinyl
United States	May 11, 2018	Bludhoney	Cassette	100	n/a	Only available with LP bundle
United States	November 29, 2019	Relapse	LP	1,950	RR6937	Includes bonus track
Italy	March 2023	Old Europa Cafe	CD	n/a	OECD 333	Remastered, includes bonus track
