= François Porcile =

French film director, essayist and musicologist

François Porcile (born 3 March 1944 in Paris) is a French film director, essayist, film historian and musicologist.

== Biography ==
A lover of cinema - Porcile entered the profession first of all through editing - François Porcile was also very early attracted by music. Throughout his career as a filmmaker and musicographer, he declined and combined his two artistic passions by connecting them intimately. As film director, François Porcile, directed more than 150 films, short and feature films, fiction and documentaries, for film and television especially for Gaumont, the INA, Arte, FR3 or TF1. His filmography covers many themes, from history (Vents d'est, vents d'ouest; Mise à mort d'une république; Propaganda - L'image et son pouvoir), to visual arts (Élie Faure ou l'esprit des formes; André Derain thèmes et variations) including photography (Le Paris de Robert Doisneau), cinema (Émile Cohl image par image), literature (Itinéraire d'Alejo Carpentier) or various social facts (Quinze jours en août, l'embellie; Femmes de la mine; Les veilleurs du Val).

A musicographer specializing in French music and music in the cinema, he was musical adviser on four films by François Truffaut, using notably unpublished scores of composer Maurice Jaubert. In addition, linking cinema and music, he made several portraits of composers including (Maurice Jaubert, Henri Dutilleux, Édith Canat de Chizy, Louis Durey, Betsy Jolas) and interpreters (Frédéric Lodéon and Benoît Thivel). For FR3 or Arte he filmed a series of concerts (Nocturne, 40 programs conceived by Dominique Jameux), two operas (L'Heure espagnole by Maurice Ravel and La clemenza di Tito by Christoph Willibald Gluck) as well as a ballet by Josef Nadj (La Mort de l'empereur).

As musicographer, he signed several major works on music, including two on French music from 1871 to 1965, published by Fayard, a monograph of Maurice Ohana (co-written with Édith Canat de Chizy), interviews with violinist Jean Leber and composer Édith Canat de Chizy, and a book (co-written with Bruno Giner on the institutions and musical stakes in Spain during the Civil War (1936–1939).

Several of his films have been awarded (Colombo Festival in 1974, Besançon festival in 1986) as well as several of his musicographies including the Prix Armand Tallier in 1972 for Maurice Jaubert, musicien populaire ou maudit le prix du Syndicat de la critique in 2001 and of the Académie Charles Cros in 2002 for Les conflits de la musique française 1940-1965 and another prize of the Académie Charles Cros for Maurice Ohana, co-written with Édith Canat de Chizy (2005).

François Porcile taught the history and aesthetics of film music at Universities Paris III and Paris VIII (1972–1984) as well as the IDHEC (1974–1979), La Fémis (1997–2002) and the Conservatoire de Paris (2001–2006). Between 1993 and 2006, he animated the sessions of La Musique plein les yeux at the Forum des images as well as the series Le Compositeur face à l'écran at the Musée de la musique in Paris. At the request of the Arte channel, he completed the reconstruction of original scores composed for silent films, including The Wonderful Lies of Nina Petrovna by Hanns Schwarz, Maldone by Jean Grémillon and Carmen by Jacques Feyder.

== Publications on film and music ==
- 1965: Défense du court métrage français, collection 7e Art, Éditions du Cerf ISBN 2204034363
- 1969: Présence de la musique à l'écran, Éditions du Cerf
- 1971: Maurice Jaubert : Musicien populaire ou maudit ?, les Éditeurs français réunis, (Prix Armand-Tallier in 1972)
- 1992 La Musique à l'écran, Cinémaction n°62, directed by François Porcile and Alain Garel, Éditions Corlet / SACEM / Télérama, ISBN 2854803760
- 1995: Les Musiques du cinéma français, with Alain Lacombe, Bordas, ISBN 2040197923
- 1999: La Belle Époque de la musique française : le Temps de Maurice Ravel, 1871–1940, Fayard, ISBN 2213603227
- 2001: Les Conflits de la musique française, 1940–1965, Fayard ISBN 2213609268 (Prix du Syndicat de la critique in 2001 and of the Académie Charles Cros in 2002)
- 2005: Maurice Ohana, with Édith Canat de Chizy, Fayard ISBN 2213624372
- 2008: Images de la musique française de piano (1871–1940), Musée des Beaux-arts d'Orléans
- 2008: Édith Canat de Chizy : entre nécessité et liberté, preface by Richard Millet, Cig’art édition ISBN 9782858940196
- 2014: D'un coup d'archet... une vie en musique, entretiens avec Jean Leber, MF Editions
- 2015: Les musiques pendant la guerre d'Espagne, with Bruno Giner, Editions Berg International

== Filmography ==
=== Director and screenwriter ===
- 1966: La Saison prochaine
- 1967: Louis Durey ou le printemps au fond de la mer
- 1969: Le Salon des refusés
- 1970: A ciel ouvert
- 1972: Le Paris de Robert Doisneau, (Prix du court métrage au Festival de Colombo)
- 1973: Élie Faure ou L'esprit des formes
- 1978: Émile Cohl image par image (codirected with Michel Patenaude)
- 1980: André Derain, thèmes et variations (Sélection officielle française au 1981 Cannes Film Festival)
- 1981: Robert Doisneau, badaud de Paris, pêcheur d'images
- 1985: Un compositeur pour le cinéma : Maurice Jaubert
- 1985: L'Heure espagnole (Primé au Festival de Besançon 1986)
- 1989: Des années frileuses
- 1989: Itinéraire d'Alejo Carpentier
- 1990–1991: Jours et nuits du théâtre (cowritten with Denys Clerval)
- 1991: Vive l'original
- 1994: La Marelle de Chris Marker
- 1996: Quinze jours en août, l'embellie
- 2001: Les Voix de l'imaginaire, portrait of Édith Canat de Chizy
- 2002: Femmes à la mine
- 2010: Vive le son !
- 2012: Une histoire aussi vieille que moi

=== Screenwriter ===
- 1983: Lettres du bagne
- 1984: L'embranchement
- 1985: Le Monde désert

=== Actor ===
- 1969: Bartleby by Jean-Pierre Bastid

=== Music advisor ===
Films by François Truffaut:

- 1975: L'Histoire d'Adèle H.
- 1976: L'Argent de poche
- 1977: L'Homme qui aimait les femmes
- 1978: La Chambre verte
