= Cuts (album) =

Studio album by Merzbow, Mats Gustafsson, Balázs Pándi
- Released: February 7, 2013
- Recorded: April 14, 2012
- Studio: Metropolis Studio, Budapest
- Genre: Noise, free improvisation
- Length: 71:48
- Label: RareNoise

Merzbow chronology
Duo (2013)	Cuts (2013)	Cat's Squirrel (2013)

Mats Gustafsson chronology
Sin Gas (2013)	Cuts (2013)	Shift (2013)

Balázs Pándi chronology
Katowice (2012)	Cuts (2013)	One (2013)

Professional ratings
Review scores
Source	Rating
The Quietus	mixed

Cuts is collaborative studio album by the Japanese noise musician Merzbow, Hungarian drummer Balázs Pándi, and Swedish saxophonist Mats Gustafsson. It was recorded during a stop on the trio's East European tour in April 2012.

This album was followed up in January 2015 by Live in Tabačka 13/04/12, which was recorded live the day before Cuts in Slovakia. (Limited edition of 400 Lps)

Cuts of Guilt, Cuts Deeper, a studio album with the addition of Thurston Moore, was released in 2015.

Cuts Up Cuts Out, a live album was recorded in 2016 with Thurston Moore was released in March 2018.

Cuts Open, a live album recorded in 2018 was released in March 2020.

The Cuts album was recorded in several improvised sessions at Metropolis Studio in Budapest, Hungary. Masami Akita then edited and mixed it at his Munemihouse studio in Tokyo, he didn't change the structure much except for moving a sax part. Pándi mixed his drums in Budapest. The track titles come from Leif Elggren's book Something like seeing in the dark.

== Track listing ==
All music is composed by Masami Akita, Mats Gustafsson, and Balázs Pándi.

No.	Title	Length
1.	"Evil Knives. Lines."	17:55
2.	"Deep Lines. Cuts."	19:07
3.	"The Fear Too. Invisible."	7:35
4.	"Like Razor Blades in the Dark."	20:55
5.	"Like Me. Like You."	6:16
Total length:		71:48

== Personnel ==
All personnel credits adapted from the album notes.

Musicians

- Masami Akita – noise electronics
- Mats Gustafsson – baritone sax, G-clarinet, live electronics
- Balázs Pándi – drums, percussion

Technical and design personnel

- Daniel Sandor – engineering
- Gabor Borosi – engineering
- James Plotkin – mastering
- Péter Szabó – cover photos
- Roki – cover art, design

== Release history ==
Region	Date	Label	Format(s)	Catalog
United Kingdom	February 7, 2013	RareNoise	MP3, FLAC, HD FLAC	RNR030
United Kingdom	February 19, 2013	RareNoise	CD	RNR030
United Kingdom	March 2013	RareNoise	2×LP (180 gram)	RNR030LP
