= Balázs Pándi =

Hungarian drummer (born 1983)

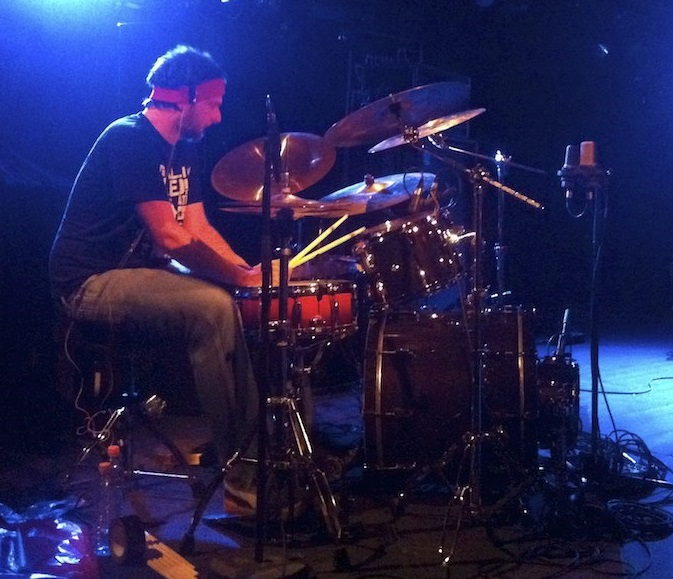
- Merzbow & Pándi Balázs performing together on April 13, 2011 at the OCCII in Amsterdam.

Background information
- Also known as: 666 Cent, Mustache
- Born: Pándi Balázs; August 6, 1983 (age 43)
- Origin: Budapest, Hungary
- Genres: Grindcore; free improvisation; free jazz; heavy metal; noise; breakcore; IDM; drum and bass; experimental rock; noise rock; harsh noise; concrete; absolute; dark ambient; jazz fusion; trip hop; avant-garde; electronic; math rock; punk jazz; experimental
- Occupations: Musician, composer
- Instruments: Drums, accordion
- Labels: Ad Noiseam; Ohm Resistance
- Website: Facebook

Balázs Pándi (born 6 August 1983) is a Hungarian drummer and journalist. He has worked and toured with various acts from all around the world including Venetian Snares, Otto von Schirach, To Live and Shave in L.A., The Kilimanjaro Darkjazz Ensemble and Zu. He also played drums for the Blood of Heroes project.

Since 2009 he has frequently played drums live with Merzbow, and they have released three live records together. They headlined the experimental stage at the Scion Rock Fest in Tampa, Florida in 2012. More recently, he and Merzbow have performed as a trio with Mats Gustafsson. They released Cuts in 2013 on RareNoise. For the follow-up Cuts of Guilt, Cuts Deeper (2015), they were joined by Thurston Moore of Sonic Youth.

Balázs started an electronica-metal-breakcore project with Bong-Ra called Wormskull in 2010 (their first album "Sound of Hell" was released in 2011). Most recently he joined the Italian experimental instrumental band Zu. His current projects include Italian doom band Obake, Metallic Taste of Blood (featuring Colin Edwin of Porcupine Tree, Eraldo Bernocchi of Obake and Jamie Saft), and Slobber Pup (Saft, Joe Morris and Trevor Dunn). From 2012 he started to play solo shows on selected festivals under his own name.

From 2013, he worked as a journalist at Hungarian news site Index. After the resignation of the majority of the staff in July 2020, he moved to Telex.

== Discography ==
With Marshall Allen, Danny Ray Thompson, Jamie Saft, Trevor Dunn and Roswell Rudd

- 2019 – Ceremonial Healing (RareNoise)

With Marco Eneidi

- 2012 – A Hint Traumatized (Karl Schmidt Verlag)

With KK Null

- 2017 – Demon Core (Ohm Resistance)
- 2019 – Demoncore 1 (Brain Ticket Death)

With Jason Köhnen

- 2017 – Darkness Comes in Two's (Svart Lava)

With Merzbow

- 2010 – Live at Fluc Wanne, Vienna, 2010/05/18 (Dry Lungs)
- 2011 – Ducks: Live in NYC (Ohm Resistance)
- 2012 – Katowice (Instant Classic)
- 2016 – Live at FAC251 (Cold Spring)

With Merzbow and Keiji Haino

- 2016 – An Untroublesome Defencelessness (RareNoise)
- 2019 – Become the Discovered, Not the Discoverer (RareNoise)

With Merzbow and Mats Gustafsson

- 2013 – Cuts (RareNoise)
- 2015 – Live in Tabačka 13/04/12 (Tabačka)

With Merzbow, Mats Gustafsson, and Thurston Moore

- 2015 – Cuts of Guilt, Cuts Deeper (RareNoise)

With Metallic Taste of Blood

- 2012 – Metallic Taste of Blood (RareNoise)

With Obake

- 2011 – Obake (RareNoise)
- 2014 – Mutations (RareNoise)

With Ivo Perelman and Joe Morris

- 2013 – One (RareNoise)

With Lee Ranaldo, Jim Jarmusch, Marc Urselli

- 2019 – Lee Ranaldo / Jim Jarmusch / Marc Urselli / Balazs Pandi (Trost)
- 2021 – Churning of the Ocean (Trost)

With Slobber Pup

- 2013 – Black Aces (RareNoise)
- 2015 – Pole Axe (RareNoise)

With Wadada Leo Smith, Jamie Saft, and Joe Morris

- 2014 – Red Hill (RareNoise)

With Rope Cosmetology

- 2009 – Diffusion de la rue de la Double Identité (Karl Schmidt Verlag)
- 2009 – Spezial: Gedankengefüge (Compound Thought) (Karl Schmidt Verlag)
- 2009 – Discoteca Festival (Karl Schmidt Verlag)
- 2011 — The Honey Fox in Hare's Longing (Karl Schmidt Verlag)
- 2012 — Disunion Strips (Karl Schmidt Verlag)

With Roswell Rudd, Jamie Saft, and Trevor Dunn

- 2016 – Strength & Power (RareNoise)

With Mikołaj Trzaska and Rafal Mazur

- 2014 – Tar & Feathers (Gusstaff)

With Jon Wesseltoft

- 2018 – Infinite Vice (The Tapeworm)
- 2019 – Terreng (Moving Furniture)

With Wormskull

- 2011 – Sound of Hell (Ad Noiseam)

Other appearances

Year	Artist	Title	Label
2007	Venetian Snares	Pink + Green	Planet Mu
2008	Last Step	1961	Planet Mu
2010	The Blood of Heroes	The Blood of Heroes	Ohm Resistance
2011	Submerged	Before Fire I Was Against Other People	Ohm Resistance
2011	Enduser	Even Weight	Ad Noiseam
2011	Imaginary Forces	Uppstigande	Ad Noiseam
2012	The Blood of Heroes	The Waking Nightmare	Ohm Resistance
2012	Loops Haunt	Zenith	Black Acre
2013	To Live and Shave in L.A.	The Grief That Shrieked to Multiply	Monotype
2013	Highness	Hold	Magic Bullet
2013	Les Rhinocéros	Les Rhinocéros II	Tzadik
2014	Loops Haunt	Exits	Black Acre
