= Merzbow =

Japanese noise project

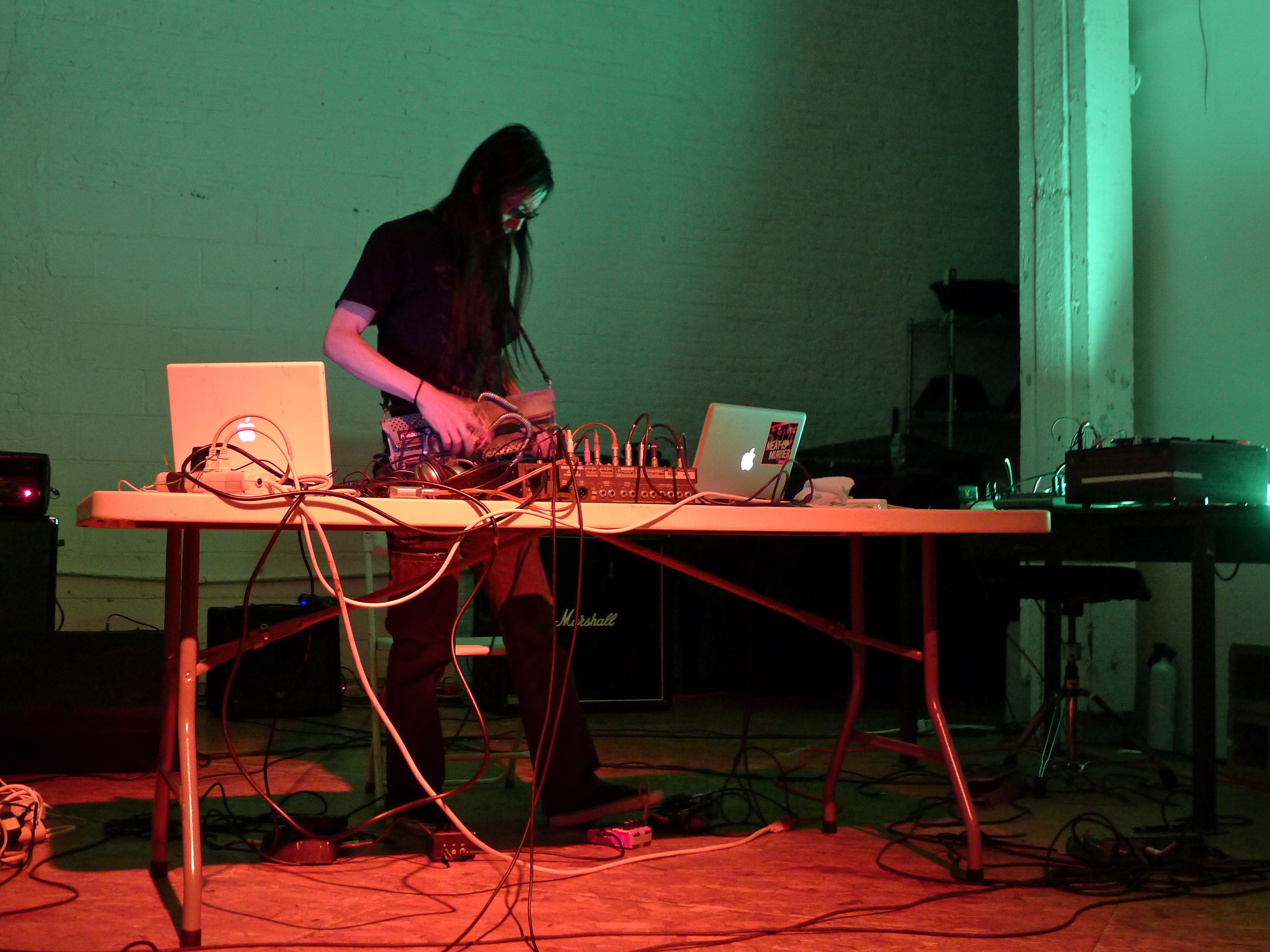
- Masami Akita performing live at ISSUE Project Room in 2010

Background information
- Origin: Tokyo, Japan
- Genres: Noise; industrial; ambient; free improvisation
- Works: Masami Akita discography
- Years active: 1979–present
- Labels: Lowest Music & Arts; ZSF Produkt; Alchemy; Alien8; Blossoming Noise; Cold Spring; Dirter Promotions; Extreme; Important; Relapse; RRR; Soleilmoon; Tzadik
- Members: Masami Akita
- Past members: Kiyoshi Mizutani; Reiko Azuma; Tetsuo Sakaibara
- Website: www.merzbow.net

Merzbow (Japanese: メルツバウ, Hepburn: Merutsubau) is a Japanese noise project started in 1979 by Masami Akita, best known for a style of harsh noise music. Since 1980, Akita has released over 500 recordings and collaborated with numerous artists.

The name Merzbow comes from the German dada artist Kurt Schwitters' artwork Merzbau, in which Schwitters transformed the interior of his house using found objects. The name was chosen to reflect Akita's dada influence and junk art aesthetic. In addition to this, Akita has cited a wide range of musical influences from progressive rock, heavy metal, free jazz, and early electronic music to non-musical influences like dadaism, surrealism and fetish culture. Since the early 2000s, he has been inspired by animal rights and environmentalism, and began to follow a vegan, straight edge lifestyle.

In addition to being a prolific musician, he has been a writer and editor for several books and magazines in Japan, and has written several books of his own. He has written about a variety of subjects, mostly about music, modern art, and underground culture. His more renowned works were on the topics of BDSM and Japanese bondage. Other art forms Akita has been interested in include painting, photography, filmmaking, and Butoh dance.

In 2000, Extreme Records released the 50 CD box set Merzbox. Akita's work has been the subject of several remix albums and at least one tribute album. This, among other achievements, has helped Merzbow to be regarded by some as the "most important artist in noise".

== Masami Akita ==
=== Early life ===
Masami Akita (秋田 昌美, Akita Masami) was born in Tokyo, Japan on December 19, 1956. He listened to psychedelic music, progressive rock and later free jazz in his youth, all of which have influenced his noise. In 1972, he became the drummer of various high school bands, which he left due to the other members being "grass-smoking Zappa freaks". By this time, he and school friend Kiyoshi Mizutani had started playing improvised studio sessions that he described as "long jam sessions along the lines of Ash Ra Tempel or Can but we didn't have any psychedelic taste". Additionally, Lou Reed's 1975 studio album Metal Machine Music would be cited as a key inspiration by Akita in 2013, who regarded it as "one of the inspired records which led me to making music only by noises and sounds generated solely by non instruments".

He later attended Tamagawa University to study fine art, at which he majored in painting and art theory. While at university, he became interested in the ideas of dada and surrealism and also studied Butoh dance. At Tamagawa, he learned of Kurt Schwitters' Merz, or art made from rubbish, including Schwitters' Merzbau (meaning Merz building, German pronunciation: [ˈmɛʁtsˌbaʊ̯]), which is the source of the name Merzbow.

=== Personal life ===
He is known as a vegan who avoids meat, eggs (except those from chickens he raises himself), dairy and leather products. He is a strict straight edge, abstaining from alcohol and tobacco. An avid bird lover who keeps many birds at home, he includes "Bariken" in his work titles and inserts anti-KFC flyers in his works. He actively supports animal rights organizations like PETA and opposes whaling and dolphin hunting.

=== Bibliography ===
After completing his degree, Akita became a freelance writer and editor for various magazines in Japan. He frequently wrote on a variety of topics involving sexuality (including pornography, S&M, and Japanese bondage), underground and extreme culture (including music and art), architecture, and animal rights. None have been published in English.

- The Anagram of Perversion (倒錯のアナグラム 周縁的ポルノグラフィーの劇場, Tōsaku no anaguramu: Shūenteki porunogurafī no gekijō) (1988)
- Mannerism of Heterodoxa (異形のマニエリスム 「邪」の民俗, Ikei no manierisumu: "Ja" no minzoku) (1989)
- Fetish Fashion (フェティッシュ・ファッション 変貌するエロスと快楽身体, Fetisshu fasshon: Henbō suru eros to kairaku shintai) (1990)
- Birth of Sex Symbol (セックス・シンボルの誕生, Sekkusu shinboru no tanjō) (1991)
- Noise War (ノイズ・ウォー ノイズ・ミュージックとその展開, Noizu wō: Noizu myūjikku to sono tenkai) (1992)
- Terminal Body Play (快楽身体の未来形, Kairaku shintai no miraikei) (1993)
- Body Exotica (ボディ・エキゾチカ, Bodi ekizochika) (1993)
- Scum Culture (スカム・カルチャー, Sukamu Karuchā) (1994)
- Modern Sexuality Bizarre (性の猟奇モダン 日本変態研究往来, Sei no ryōki modan: Nihon hentai kenkyū ōrai) (1994)
- Nude Empire (裸体の帝国 (ヌード・ワールド Vol.1 ヌーディズムの歴史 1), Ratai no teikoku (Nūdo wārudo vol. 1: nūdizumu no rekishi 1)) (1995)
- Nihon kinbaku shashinshi (日本緊縛写真史) (1996)
- Anal Baroque (アナル・バロック, Anaru Barokku) (1997)
- Vintage Erotica (ヴィンテージ・エロチカ, Vintēji erochika) (1998)
- Nyoinkō: Seigaku koten yori (女陰考 性学古典より) (1999)
- Strange Nude Cult (ストレンジ・ヌード・カルト 不思議の裸体天国 (ヌード・ワールド Vol.2), Sutorenji nūdo karuto: Fushigi no ratai tengoku (Nūdo wārudo vol. 2)) (1999)
- Love Position (ラブ・ポジション, Rabu pojishon) (2000)
- Cruelty Free Life (わたしの菜食生活, Watashi no saishoku seikatsu) (2005)

== History ==
=== Beginning (1979–1989) ===
Merzbow began as the duo of Masami Akita and Kiyoshi Mizutani, who met Akita in junior high school. Akita started releasing noise recordings on cassettes through his own record label, Lowest Music & Arts, which was founded in order to trade cassette tapes with other underground artists. The earliest recording he made was Metal Acoustic Music. Various other early releases included Remblandt Assemblage and Solonoise 1. The Collection series consisted of ten cassettes, the first five were recorded in a studio for an independent label called Ylem, which went defunct before they could be released. So, Akita released them himself, and recorded five more at home.

I threw all my past music career in the garbage. There was no longer any need for concepts like 'career' and 'skill'. I stopped playing music and went in search of an alternative.

— Masami Akita

Early methods included what Akita referred to as "material action", made by making quiet sounds with household objects which were recorded with close miking or rubbing the microphone directly on things and overloading the recording levels. This method was used on Material Action for 2 Microphones and Material Action 2 N.A.M.. This led to a technique he termed "environmental percussion", where instrumental sounds were made with non-instruments such as banging on the floor, gas stove, spring of a table lamp for percussion sounds. As well as using a violin bow on objects like plastic cassette cases or cards, rubber bands as a guitar sound, blowing in a toilet paper tube as horns, scratching metal as electrical sounds, etc. At this time, Akita also made a homemade instrument consisting of a metal case strung with piano wires, guitar strings, and springs. It was played by bowing or placing objects inside and shaking it. This can be heard on albums like Crocidura Dsi Nezumi, Ecobondage and Storage.

Among early releases like the box set Pornoise/1kg, Merzbow created artwork using photocopies of collages made out of manga and porn magazines he found in trash cans in the Tokyo subway. Akita explained this as trying to "create the same feeling as the secret porn customer for the people buying my cassettes in the early 80s".

ZSF Produkt (pronounced zusufu, from an ancient Japanese word meaning "magnetic") was founded in 1984 to release music by similar artists within the industrial movement but eventually became the successor to Lowest Music & Arts. Numerous Merzbow releases were recorded at ZSF Produkt Studio, Masami Akita's home studio.

During this era, Merzbow found much wider recognition and began making recordings for various international labels. Batztoutai with Memorial Gadgets was his first LP released outside of Japan.

Merzbow's first performances outside of Japan were at the Jazz-on-Amur festival in March 1988 in Khabarovsk, USSR. Merzbow were invited along with computer composer Kazuo Uehara. Apparently Merzbow was mistaken for a group using hi-tech equipment. The first set was typical Merzbow style, but was stopped for being too noisy. For the show the following day, the duo were asked to play "more musically". and featured Akita on drums and Mizutani on piano and guitar. Following this, touring would become an important activity for Merzbow, especially for the connections made with artists and labels. Merzbow would tour Europe in 1989 and the United States in 1990. Kiyoshi Mizutani left Merzbow after the 1989 European tour and continues to pursue a solo career.

=== Noise electronics era (1989–1999) ===
During a European tour in September–October 1989, Merzbow could only bring simple and portable gear; this led to the harsh noise style Merzbow became known for in the 1990s. Cloud Cock OO Grand (1990) was the first example of this new style, Merzbow's first digital recording (on DAT), and the first recording made for the CD format. It also includes live material recorded during the tour.

But when I started live in late 1980s I didn't like to use tape on stage. I like only live electronics. So, my studio works changed to more live composition style. I'm still using many tapes in studio works, but difference is I treat tapes and instruments. Before, I used tapes as overdubbing concept. But now tapes are crashing together, no static overdub. I found that style on Cloud Cock OO Grand.

— Masami Akita

Beginning in the mid-1990s, Merzbow began to be influenced by death metal and grindcore. Recordings from this time are mostly recorded at extreme volume, some mastered at levels far beyond standard (Noisembryo, Pulse Demon). In 1994, Akita acquired a vintage EMS synthesizer. From 1996, plans were made to release a "10 (or maybe 12)" CD box set on Extreme Records. In 2000, Extreme Records released the Merzbox, a fifty CD set of Merzbow records, twenty of them not previously released.

Throughout most of the 1990s, Merzbow live was a trio with Reiko A. on electronics and Tetsuo Sakaibara (aka Bara) on voice and dance. Masami Akita occasionally played drums for Hijokaidan during the early–mid 1990s.

In the early 1990s, Masami Akita composed the soundtracks to numerous kinbaku videos by Fuji Planning (不二企画, Fuji Kikaku) and seppuku-themed videos by their sub-label Right Brain. Akita also directed Lost Paradise (失楽園 乗馬服女腹切り, Shitsurakuen: Jōbafuku onna harakiri) for Right Brain. Some of this music was included on Music for Bondage Performance and Music for Bondage Performance 2, co-credited to Right Brain Audile. Director Ian Kerkhof would use a Merzbow track for his 1992 film La séquence des barres parallèles, and Akita composed original music for Kerhof's 1994 film The Dead Man 2: Return of the Dead Man. Kerkhof made the documentary Beyond Ultra Violence: Uneasy Listening by Merzbow in 1998. Akita also created music for Ilppo Pohjola's Asphalto (1998) and Routemaster (2000).

=== Laptop era (1999–2009) ===
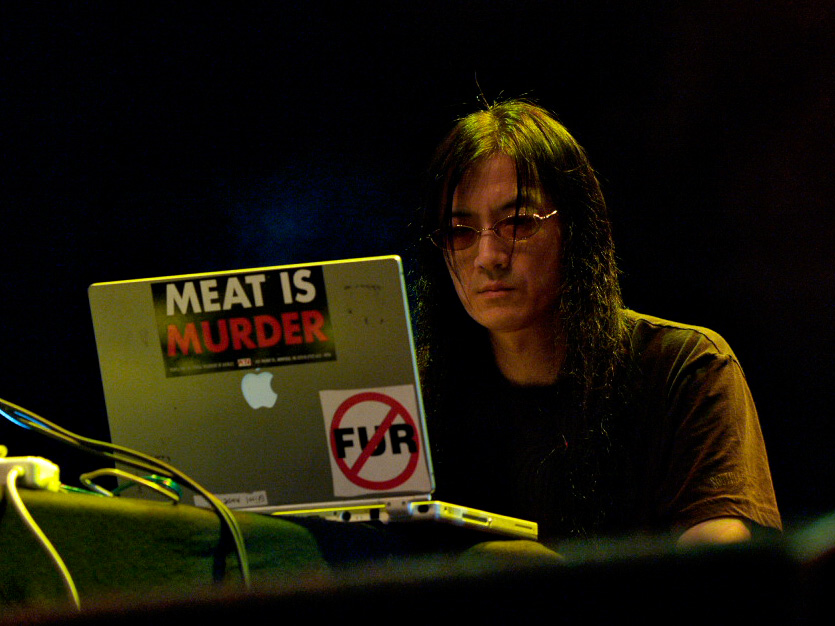
Masami Akita performing live at Moers Festival in 2007

Since 1999, Akita has used computers in his recordings, having first acquired a Macintosh to work on art for the Merzbox. Also at this time he began referring to his home studio as "Bedroom, Tokyo". At live performances, Akita has produced noise music from either two laptop computers or combination of a laptop and analog synthesizers/guitar pedals. Reiko A. and Bara left Merzbow during this time; Reiko Azuma now has a solo career. Since 2001, Jenny Akita (née Kawabata) started being credited for artwork on various releases.

Since 2001, Akita started utilising samples of animal sounds in various releases starting with Frog. Around 2002, Akita became a vegan. He later stated:

I started raising four bantams, the little ornamental chickens. With this experience as a start, I gradually started to be concerned and care about chickens and all the barn animals I used to eat without giving it a second thought before. So I started reading books and researching on the internet about Animal Rights and that triggered an awareness of "evil" that human society has done.

— Masami Akita

During this period, Akita also became a supporter of PETA, which is reflected in his animal-themed releases. An example of this is Minazo Vol. 1 and Vol. 2, dedicated to an elephant seal he visited often at the zoo and Bloody Sea, a protest against Japanese whaling. He has also produced several works centered around recordings of his pet chickens (notably Animal Magnetism and Turmeric).

Also in 2002, Akita released Merzbeat, which was seen as a significant departure from his trademark abstract style in that it contains beat-oriented pieces. This has sparked some controversy among fans, though some reviewers pointed out that it sounded very similar to Aqua Necromancer (1998), which features samples of progressive rock drumming. Merzbird (2004) and Merzbuddha (2005) followed in a similar vein with sampled beats combined with Merzbow's signature harsh noise.

=== Current era (2009–present) ===
Starting in the mid-2000s, Masami Akita began to reintroduce junk metal and effects pedals back into his setup. In 2008, Akita reintroduced the drum kit, his first instrument. This can be heard on the 13 Japanese Birds series. At this time he changed the name of his home studio to Munemihouse. By the early 2010s, he was using a large number of pedals, oscillators and tone generators, and reduced to a single laptop running granular synthesis software. In 2014, he toured without a laptop.

Beginning in November 2009, Merzbow started releasing archival material from the 1980s and 1990s, both reissues and previously unreleased material, several of which were released on cassette. The Blossoming Noise label reissued the 1980s cassettes E-Study, Collection 004, Collection 005, Normal Music, and Flesh Metal Orgasm. The Kibbutz cassette was reissued on vinyl by Urashima. Other cassettes of unreleased material include Untitled Nov 1989, 9888A, April 1992, and Variations for Electric Fan. 2010–2013 saw the release several archival box sets; Merzbient, Merzphysics, Merzmorphosis, Lowest Music & Arts 1980–1983, and Duo.

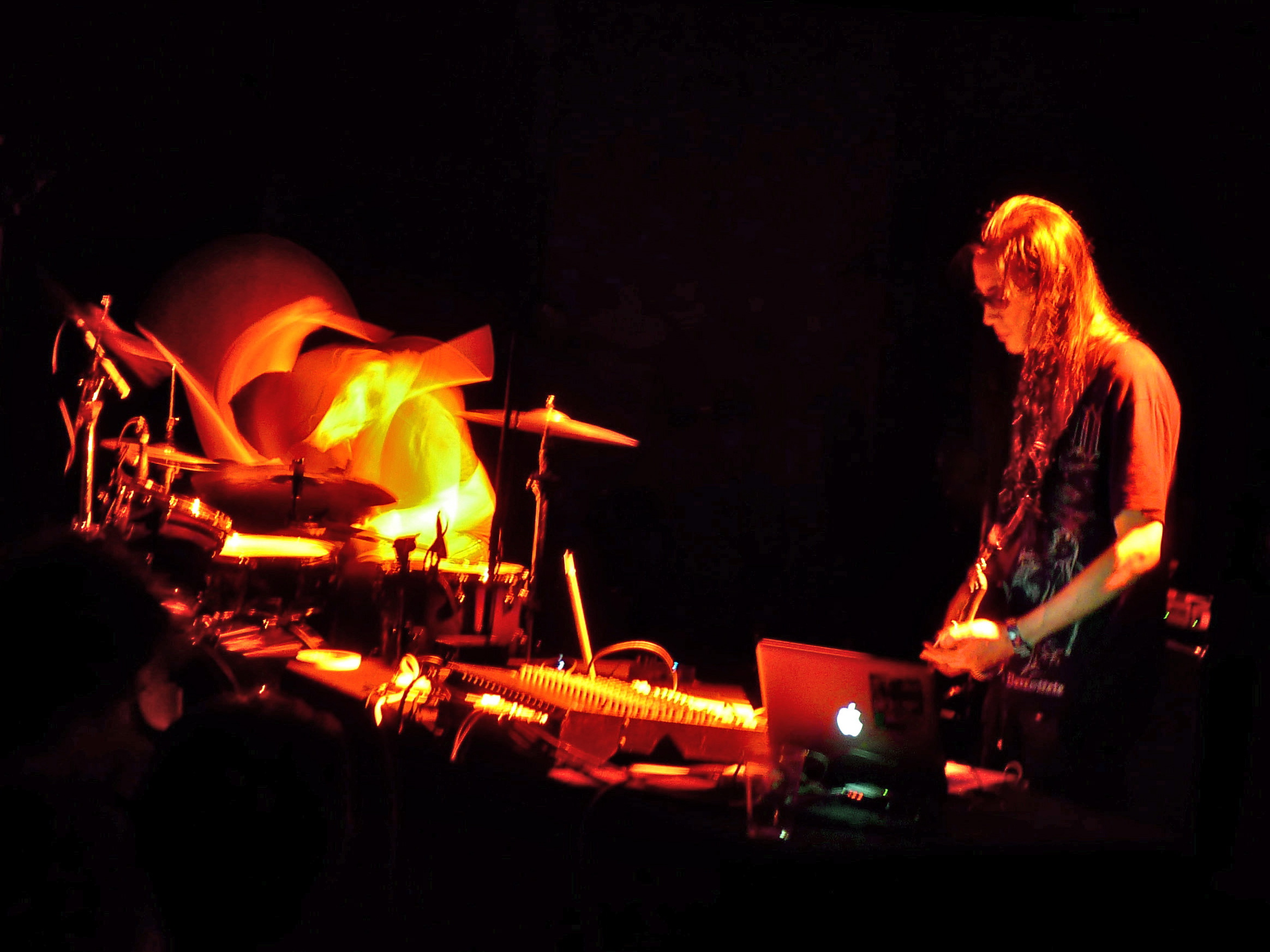
Masami Akita and Balázs Pándi live in 2010

Akita began collaborating with the Hungarian drummer Balázs Pándi in 2009, initially Pándi served as a live drummer for Merzbow. This resulted in the live albums Live at Fluc Wanne, Vienna 2010/05/18, Ducks: Live in NYC, and Katowice. Akita and Pándi then began to record studio albums collaborating with additional musicians, Cuts (2013) with the Swedish saxophone player Mats Gustafsson, Cuts of Guilt, Cuts Deeper (2015) with Gustafsson and Thurston Moore, and An Untroublesome Defencelessness with Keiji Haino (2016), all released by RareNoiseRecords. Akita, Pándi, and Gustafsson also toured together and released the live LP Live in Tabačka 13/04/12.

Merzbow also released several collaborations with industrial/noise musicians he had known since the 1980s: Spiral Right / Spiral Left with Z'EV, The Black Album with John Duncan, and a trio of releases with Maurizio Bianchi, Amniocentesi / Envoise 30 05 82 (a split with two tracks from 1982), Merzbow Meets M.B., and Amalgamelody. Gensho, the seventh collaborative releases with Boris, was released in 2016. It is a double album, one disc is by Boris and one by Merzbow, that are meant to be played at the same time.

In April 2015, Merzbow collaborated with American art rock band Xiu Xiu, releasing Merzxiu. They had previously collaborated in 2010 in a live show at (Le) Poisson Rouge in New York City.

Beginning in April 2018, the Japanese label Slowdown Records began releasing a series of archival recordings spanning Merzbow's career on a semimonthly basis, starting with Hyper Music 1 Vol. 1 and 23 November 1979 (B). Groups of six releases were later compiled in 6 CD box sets. These boxes were themselves later compiled in larger boxes: 10×6=60 in 2021 and 35 CD Box in 2022. Slowdown has also released several new recordings in addition to the archival releases. By the end of 2022, Slowdown has released 96 archival CDs and 116 CDs total. From April 2024, Slowdown began a new series of digital release on Bandcamp and other services. The series includes newly recorded albums (starting with Gecko Raga and Hatomosphere Variant) and archival releases (starting with Spirulina Green and Bon Bullet).

== Musical style ==
Merzbow's sounds employ the use of distortion, feedback, and noises from synthesizers, machinery, and home-made noisemakers. While much of Merzbow's output is intensely harsh in character, Akita does occasionally make forays into ambient music, as in Merzbient. Vocals are employed sometimes, but never in a lyrical sense. Akita also occasionally uses elements of melody and rhythm.

Akita's early work consisted of industrial noise music made from tape loops and conventional instruments. Similar to his present albums, he produced lengthy, disorienting pieces. He also became famous for the sheer volume of his releases.

During the 1990s Akita's work became much harsher and was generally mastered at a louder volume than usual. These were heavily influenced by death metal and grindcore bands of the time (a prime example is Venereology). The mid-1990s saw Akita being heavily influenced by psychedelic bands and this was reflected in various albums.

== Side projects ==
In addition to Merzbow, Masami Akita has been involved in a number of side projects and groups.

=== Aliases ===
- Abtechtonics (or variations of this) was used by Akita for his artwork on Merzbow releases and his books.
- House Hunt Hussies is credited for a track on the Sexorama 1 compilation. ZSF Produkt is listed as the contact address.
- Lotus Club was used for the tape Le Sang et la Rose in 1983 because of the difference in musical style.
- Pornoise was a mail art project Akita had in the 1980s where he made collages using discarded magazines – in particular pornographic magazines – taken from the trash. These were then sent along with his cassettes, the idea being that his art was like cheap mail order pornography. Pornoise/1kg was released as part of these activities. Pornoise was credit as the artist for a track on the Sexorama 2 compilation and co-credited for artwork on Scissors for Cutting Merzbow.
- Right Brain Audile is co-credited on the two Music for Bondage Performance albums, as they're soundtracks he did for several S&M and faux-Seppuku films produced by Kinbiken/Right Brain. The abbreviation RBA appears in track titles on Merzbient, which features recordings from this era.
- SCUM was a project where Akita made new releases out of previous Merzbow sessions using cut-ups, effects, and mixing. SCUM is an acronym, standing for something different on each release, including "Society for Cutting Up Merzbow" (a reference to the SCUM Manifesto), "Scissors for CUtting Merzbow", "Steel CUM", etc.
- Zecken was used for two solo synthesizer performances in 1996.

=== Groups ===
- Bustmonster was a "conceptual death metal" group (because they couldn't play death metal) with Tetsuo Sakaibara, Fumio Kosakai, Masahiko Ohno, Shohei Iwasaki, Maso Yamazaki and Zev Asher.
- Flying Testicle was a trio with Yamazaki and Asher.
- Merzbow Null was a collaboration between the groups of Merzbow and Null. In addition to Masami Akita and Kazuyuki Kishino, it featured several other members of both groups such as Reiko Azuma, Asami Hayashi, Kiyoshi Mizutani, Yushi Okano, Ikuo Taketani, etc. They did many improv performances during 1983–84 and released over a dozen cassettes.
- Tibeta Ubik was a duo of Akita and Kishino active at the same time as Merzbow Null.
- True Romance was a performance art project in the early 1990s with Tetsuo Sakaibara (who became a live member of Merzbow) and Toshiyuki Seido. The performances included fetish equipment, simulated gore (including autopsy), mechanical devices, nude models, etc. It was inspired by Viennese Actionism. Masami Akita was a performer in addition to composing the backing music.

Other groups include: 3RENSA with Duenn and Koji Nakamura, Abe Sada with S.M.U.T., Commando Bruno Sanmartino with Fumio Kosakai and Masaya Nakahara, Kikuri with Keiji Haino, Maldoror with Mike Patton, MAZK with Zbigniew Karkowski, Melting Lips with Hanayo, Muscats with Hanayo and Masaya Nakahara, Metalik Zeit with Aube, Merz-Banana with Melt-Banana, Satanstornade with Russell Haswell (they later released an album entitled Satanstornade under their real names), Secrets with Tetsuya Mugishima (aka Seven), and Shalon Kelly King with Fumio Kosakai.
