= An Untroublesome Defencelessness =

Studio album by Merzbow / Keiji Haino / Balázs Pándi
- Released: June 24, 2016
- Recorded: April 15, 2015
- Studio: Gok Sound, Tokyo
- Genre: Free improvisation, noise
- Length: 55:04
- Label: RareNoise

Merzbow chronology
Atsusaku (2016)	An Untroublesome Defencelessness (2016)	Kakapo (2016)

Keiji Haino chronology
I Wonder If You Noticed "I'm Sorry" Is Such a Lovely Sound It Keeps Things from Getting Worse (2016)	An Untroublesome Defencelessness (2016)

Balázs Pándi chronology
Strength & Power (2016)	An Untroublesome Defencelessness (2016)	Live at FAC251 (2016)

Professional ratings
Review scores
Source	Rating
All About Jazz	4/5 stars
Allmusic	4/5 stars
Drowned in Sound	8/10
Louder Than War	favorable
The Quietus	mixed
Something Else!	favorable

An Untroublesome Defencelessness (迷惑をかけない無防備, Meiwaku o kakenai mubōbi) is a collaborative studio album by the Japanese noise musician Merzbow, Japanese guitarist Keiji Haino, and the Hungarian drummer Balázs Pándi. Merzbow and Pándi have worked together since 2009; Merzbow and Haino previously played together as Kikuri, and released the album Pulverized Purple on Les Disques Victo in 2008.

== Track listing ==
All music is composed by Masami Akita, Keiji Haino, Balázs Pándi.

No.	Title	Length
1.	"Why Is the Courtesy of the Prey Always Confused with the Courtesy of the Hunters... (Part I)" (食われるものの礼儀と食うものの礼儀と騙され続けていることとは・・・)	2:55
2.	"Why Is the Courtesy of the Prey Always Confused with the Courtesy of the Hunters... (Part II)" (食われるものの礼儀と食うものの礼儀と騙され続けていることとは・・・)	9:50
3.	"Why Is the Courtesy of the Prey Always Confused with the Courtesy of the Hunters... (Part III)" (食われるものの礼儀と食うものの礼儀と騙され続けていることとは・・・)	13:51
4.	"How Differ the Instructions of the Left from the Instructions of the Right? (Part I)" (右側にある注意書きと左側にある注意書きの違いは？)	5:27
5.	"How Differ the Instructions of the Left from the Instructions of the Right? (Part II)" (右側にある注意書きと左側にある注意書きの違いは？)	8:55
6.	"How Differ the Instructions of the Left from the Instructions of the Right? (Part III)" (右側にある注意書きと左側にある注意書きの違いは？)	6:13
7.	"How Differ the Instructions of the Left from the Instructions of the Right? (Part IV)" (右側にある注意書きと左側にある注意書きの違いは？)	7:50
Total length:		55:04

== Personnel ==
All personnel credits adapted from the album notes.

Musicians

- Masami Akita – electronics
- Keiji Haino – guitar, vocals, electronics
- Balázs Pándi – drums

Technical personnel

- Yoshiaki Kondo – engineering
- Daniel Sandor – mixing
- James Plotkin – mastering
- Rok – artwork, design

== Release history ==
Region	Date	Label	Format(s)	Catalog
United Kingdom	June 24, 2016	RareNoise	MP3, FLAC, HD FLAC	RNR061
United Kingdom	July 2016	RareNoise	CD	RNR061
United Kingdom	July 2016	RareNoise	2×LP (180 gram)	RNR061LP
