= The intellect given birth to here (eternity) is too young =

Live album by Peter Brötzmann and Keiji Haino
- Released: 2022
- Recorded: August 4 and 8, 2018
- Venue: Zebulon, Los Angeles; The Chapel, San Francisco
- Genre: Free improvisation
- Label: Black Editions; BE-1005; Purple Trap; PT006
- Producer: Michael Ehlers, Peter Kolovos

The intellect given birth to here (eternity) is too young is a four-disc box set live album of music by saxophonist and clarinetist Peter Brötzmann and electric guitarist, percussionist, and vocalist Keiji Haino. Discs one and two were recorded on August 4, 2018, at Zebulon in Los Angeles, while discs three and four were recorded on August 8, 2018, at The Chapel in San Francisco. The album was released on vinyl in limited quantities in a box set containing color prints of art by both musicians in 2022 by Black Editions and Haino's Purple Trap label, and is also available as a digital download.

== Reception ==
Professional ratings
Review scores
Source	Rating
All About Jazz	4/5 stars

Mark Corroto of All About Jazz wrote: "Like a tornado, there is a powerful and captivating force about the two musicians' performance that entices you to lean face first into their superstorm... The reunion of these two giants of creative music produces a surge of energy throughout the 2¾ hours of music making what could power a small village... The two musicians maintain a mutual respect here, neither demanding to lead nor constraining the other."

Magnet's Bill Meyer stated: "What Haino and Brötzmann do here exceeds words such as 'improvisation' or 'ritual,' although both capture aspects of the experience... to follow the course of either show from start to finish is to hear an echo of a ceremony. But there's more going on here than the sound of two guys playing an assortment of instruments... This is the sound of two vortexes of existence coexisting, summoning the memories of many decades... and the awareness of whatever vastness yawns beyond their inevitable endings."

In an article for Stereogum, Phil Freeman described the album as "absolutely mind-scouring... loud, unrelenting, and yet beautiful. Essential stuff."

Writing for The Quietus, Daryl Worthington commented: "On percussion, Haino seems to freeze time, stumbling, dramatically pausing and then launching into rhythms operating in a different frame rate to the sax. With guitar he unleashes angry spasms, shards of twang that seem to attack the microscopic pauses for breath in Brötzmann's playing. At other points Haino twists into noodly excursions, flurries of notes toying with negative space, filling it with sound and morphing its contours."

Eyal Hareuveni of The Free Jazz Collective called the album "almost three hours of sublime music," and remarked: "the tension between these great free improvisers makes their music so unique... These live settings exhaust not only the alchemical dynamics of Brötzmann and Haino, but also their extensive experience and the wisdom of their playing, and, as can be expected, it defies easy categorization."

The editors of Burning Ambulance included the album in their "Best Music of 2022" list.

== Track listings ==
Disc 1

1. "Begging your pardon, Master Sokushinbutsu" – 23:13
2. "You have sacrificed your body for us but things continue to worsen" – 21:28

Disc 2

1. "The beginning or the end which will be the first to admit its opponent?" – 22:26
2. "A landscape never glimpsed before is on the verge of manifestation" – 14:18

Disc 3

1. "The intellect given birth to here (existence)" – 19:43
2. "is too young" – 22:33

Disc 4

1. "The wound that lapses into this world can sometimes be bigger" – 19:34
2. "than the wound that was dropped here" – 20:44

== Personnel ==
- Peter Brötzmann – B♭ clarinet, tárogató, tenor saxophone
- Keiji Haino – electric guitar, drum kit, percussion, voice
