= Ivo Malec =

Croatian-born French composer (1925–2019)

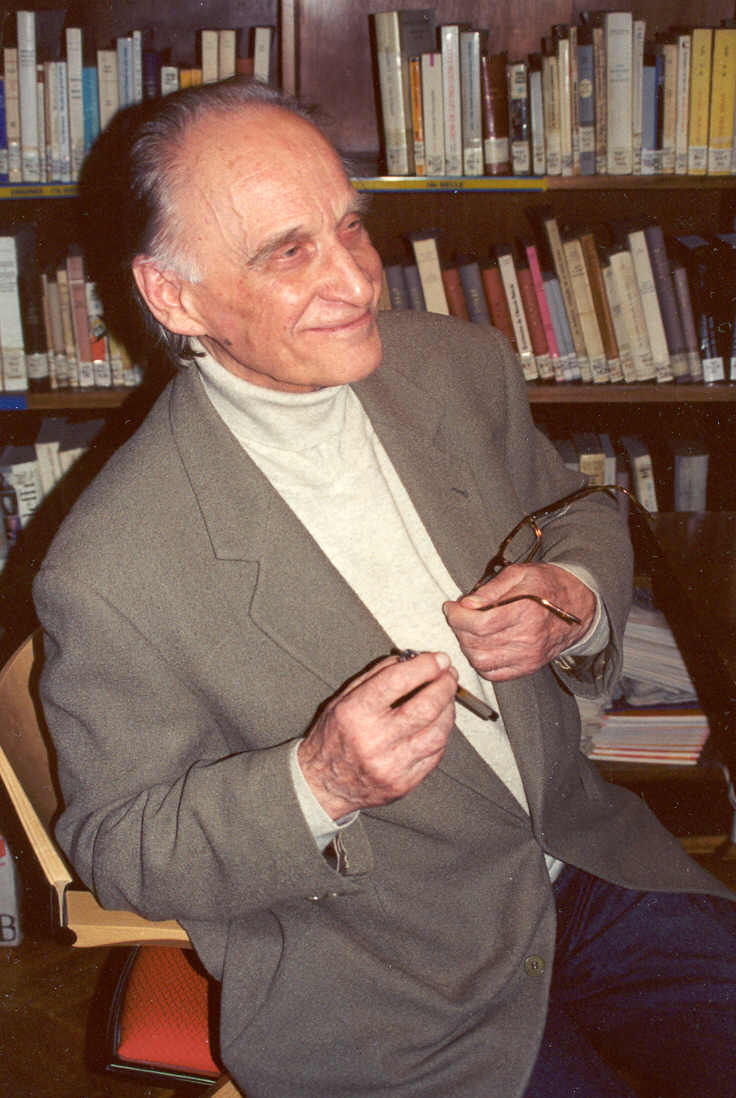
- Born: 30 March 1925; Zagreb, Kingdom of Serbs, Croats, and Slovenes (modern Croatia)
- Died: 14 August 2019 (aged 94); Paris, France
- Occupations: Composer; Conductor; Academic teacher
- Organizations: Conservatoire de Paris
- Awards: Ordre des Arts et des Lettres

Ivo Malec (30 March 1925 – 14 August 2019) was a Croatian-born French composer, music educator and conductor. One of the earliest Yugoslav composers to obtain high international regard, his works have been performed by symphony orchestras throughout Europe and North America.

== Biography ==
Malec was born in Zagreb on 30 March 1925. Coming from a rather 'classical' background, he met Pierre Schaeffer, whom he considered his 'true and only master'; Schaeffer's teachings turned Malec into one of the most important leaders of the Groupe de Recherches Musicales. Since then he dedicated himself to a more radical style. He received a number of awards including the Grand Prix National de Musique in 1992. He was resident in France since 1955 and taught at the Conservatoire de Paris from 1972 to 1990, where his students included Édith Canat de Chizy, Denis Dufour, Philippe Hurel, Philippe Leroux and Gerard Pesson. See: List of music students by teacher: K to M#Ivo Malec.

Malec's approach to composition, similar to that of Dufour or Iannis Xenakis, emphasizes all aspects of sound, including texture, density, movement, timbre and notably sonic character and form and the use of sound objects.

Malec died in Paris on 14 August 2019, at the age of 94.

== Works ==
- Klaviersonate, 1949
- Sinfonie, 1951
- Cellosonate, 1956
- Mouvements en coloeurs, 1959
- Reflets, 1961
- Sigma, 1963
- Miniatures pour Lewis Carroll, 1964
- Lignes et Points, 1965
- Cantate pour elle, 1966
- Oral, 1967
- Lumina, 1968
- Luminétudes, 1968
- Lied, 1969
- Dodécaméron, 1970
- Pieris, 1975
- Triola ou Symphonie pour moi-même, 1977–78
- Week-end, 1982
- Ottava bassa, 1984
- Attacca, 1986
- Artemisia, 1991
- Doppio Coro, 1993
- Exempla, 1994
- Ottava alta, 1995
- Sonoris causa, 1997
- Arc-en-cello, 2000
