= Cuneiform Records discography =

This is a list of releases by Cuneiform Records.

== Catalog ==
No.	Year	Artist(s)	Title	Format	Notes
Rune 001	September 1984	R. Stevie Moore	What's the Point?!!	LP	
Rune 002	April 1985	However	Calling	LP	
Rune 003	July 1985	Present	Le Poison Qui Rend Fou	LP	reissued on Rune 383
Rune 004	January 1986	David Borden/New Mother Mallard Band	Anatidae	LP	
Rune 005	January 1986	The Muffins	Open City	LP	
Rune 006	February 1987	PFS	Illustrative Problems	LP	
Rune 007	February 1987	Piero Milesi	The Nuclear Observatory of Dr. Nanof	LP	
Rune 008	July 1987	Doctor Nerve	Armed Observation	LP	reissued on CD as Rune 38
Rune 009	July 1987	Univers Zero	Heatwave	LP	
Rune 010	April 1988	David Borden/Mother Mallard	Migration	LP	
Rune 011	March 1989	Phil Miller	Cutting Both Ways	LP	
Rune 012	July 1990	Curlew	Live in Berlin	LP, CD, DL	
Rune 013	June 1988	Mikel Rouse Broken Consort	A Lincoln Portrait	LP	
Rune 014	October 1988	Miriodor	Miriodor	LP	
Rune 015	October 1988	Univers Zero	Uzed	LP	
Rune 016	November 1988	Mother Mallard's Portable Masterpiece Company	The Continuing Story of Counterpoint, Parts 9-12	LP, CD, DL	
Rune 017	March 1989	Present	Triskaidekaphobie/Le Poison Qui Rend Fou	LP	reissued as Rune 382
Rune 018	July 1989	Piero Milesi & Daniel Bacalov	La Camera Astratta	LP	
Rune 019	July 1989	Birdsongs of the Mesozoic	Faultline	LP, CD, DL	
Rune 020	December 1989	Univers Zero	1313	LP	originally released 1977 as “Univers Zero”, re-released as Rune 1313
Rune 021	January 1990	David Borden/Mother Mallard	The Continuing Story of Counterpoint, Parts 5–8	LP, CD, DL	
Rune 022	July 1990	PFS	279	CD	PFS was an offshoot band from Cartoon
Rune 023	July 1990	Peter Frohmader	Macrocosm	CD	
Rune 024	September 1990	U Totem	U Totem	CD	
Rune 025	September 1990	Forever Einstein	Artificial Horizon	CD	
Rune 026	February 1991	Doctor Nerve	Beta 14 OK	CD	
Rune 027	February 1991	Curlew	Bee	CD, DL	
Rune 028	January 1992	David Borden/Mother Mallard	The Continuing Story of Counterpoint, Parts 1–4, 8	CD, DL	
Rune 029	September 1991	Univers Zero	Heresie	CD	reissued as Rune 313
Rune 030	May 1991	Richard Pinhas	Chronolyse	CD	
Rune 031	May 1991	Richard Pinhas	East West	CD	
Rune 032	August 1991	Miriodor	3e Avertissement/3rd Warning	CD	
Rune 033	August 1991	Daniel Denis	Sirius and the Ghosts	CD	
Rune 034	September 1991	Phil Miller	Digging In	CD	
Rune 035	January 1992	Birdsongs of the Mesozoic	Pyroclastics	CD, DL	
Rune 036	January 1992	Richard Pinhas	L'Ethique	CD	
Rune 037	January 1992	Heldon	Heldon II / Allez Teia	CD	
Rune 038	January 1992	Doctor Nerve	Armed Observation / Out To Bomb Fresh Kings	CD, DL	originally LP Rune 8
Rune 039	January 1992	Univers Zero	Ceux du dehors	CD	
Rune 040	May 1992	Richard Pinhas	DWW	CD	
Rune 041	May 1992	Forever Einstein	Opportunity Crosses The Bridge	CD	
Rune 042	September 1992	Mujician	The Journey	CD	
Rune 043	September 1992	Heldon	Interface	CD	
Rune 044	September 1992	Richard Pinhas	Iceland	CD	
Rune 045	September 1992	Henry Kaiser	Lemon Fish Tweezer	CD	
Rune 046	January 1993	Chainsaw Jazz	Disconcerto	CD, DL	
Rune 047	September 1992	Curlew	The Hardwood	VHS	music released as Rune 304
Rune 048	January 1993	Kombinat M	Hybrid Beat	CD	
Rune 049	January 1993	Daniel Denis	Les eaux troubles	CD	
Rune 050	January 1993	Curlew with Amy Denio	A Beautiful Western Saddle	CD	reissued as Rune 303
Rune 051	May 1993	Heldon	Electronic Guerilla	CD	
Rune 052	May 1993	Heldon	It's Always Rock and Roll	CD	
Rune 053	May 1993	Heldon	Stand By	CD	
Rune 054	May 1993	Philharmonie	Les Elephants Carillionneurs	CD	
Rune 055	May 1993	Birdsongs of the Mesozoic	The Fossil Record 1980-1987	CD, DL	
Rune 056	March 1994	Virgil Moorefield	Distractions on the Way to the King's Party	CD	
Rune 057	March 1994	George Cartwright	Dot	CD, DL	
Rune 058	November 1994	David Borden	Places, Times & People	CD, DL	
Rune 059	March 1994	Peter Frohmader	Cycle of Eternity	CD	
Rune 060	March 1994	Heldon	Heldon IV: Agneta Nilsson	CD	
Rune 061	March 1994	Richard Pinhas	Rhizosphere / Live Paris 1982	CD	
Rune 062	November 1994	Mujician	Poem About the Hero	CD	
Rune 063	November 1994	Piero Milesi	Modi	CD	
Rune 064	November 1994	Philharmonie	Nord	CD	
Rune 065	March 1995	Heldon	Un Reve Sans Consequence Speciale	CD	
Rune 066	November 1994	U Totem	Strange Attractors	CD	
Rune 067	March 1995	Hugh Hopper Band	Carousel	CD	
Rune 068	March 1995	Forrest Fang	Folklore	CD	
Rune 069	March 1995	Birdsongs of the Mesozoic	Dancing on A'a	CD, DL	
Rune 070	May 1995	Doctor Nerve	Skin	CD, DL	
Rune 071	May 1995	Blast	Wire Stitched Ears	CD, DL	
Rune 072	May 1995	The Siamese Stepbrothers	The Siamese Stepbrothers	CD	
Rune 073	May 1995	Happy Family	Happy Family	CD	
Rune 074	October 1995	Volapük	Le Feu du Tigre	CD	
Rune 075	October 1995	various artists	Unsettled Scores (disc 1)	CD	Cuneiform artists cover other Cuneiform artists
Rune 076	October 1995	various artists	Unsettled Scores (disc 2)	CD	
Rune 077	October 1995	Hugh Hopper/Alan Gowen	Two Rainbows Daily	CD	originally released 1980
Rune 078	October 1995	Miriodor	Jongleries Elastiques [Elastic Juggling]	CD	
Rune 079	February 1996	C.W. Vrtacek	Silent Heaven	CD	
Rune 080	February 1996	Curlew	Paradise	CD, DL	
Rune 081	January 1996	Rattlemouth	Walking a Full Moon Dog	CD	
Rune 082	July 1996	Mujician	Birdman	CD	
Rune 083	July 1996	Elton Dean Quintet	Silent Knowledge	CD, DL	
Rune 084	July 1996	Philharmonie	Rage	CD	
Rune 085	July 1996	5uu's	Point of Views	CD	
Rune 086	October 1996	Raoul Björkenheim & Krakatau	Ritual	CD, DL	
Rune 087	October 1996	Present	Live!	CD	
Rune 088	October 1996	Doctor Nerve	Every Screaming Ear	CD	
Rune 089	January 1997	Gary Windo	His Master's Bones	CD	
Rune 090	January 1997	Soft Machine	Spaced	CD	recorded 1969
Rune 091	January 1997	Boud Deun	Astronomy Made Easy	CD, DL	
Rune 092	September 1997	Elton Dean, Paul Dunmall, Tony Levin, Paul Rogers, Roswell Rudd, Keith Tippett	Bladik	CD, DL	
Rune 093	September 1997	Happy Family	Toscco	CD	
Rune 094	September 1997	Volapük	Slang!	CD	
Rune 095	September 1997	Blast	Stringy Rugs	CD, DL	
Rune 096	September 1997	Boom	One Hour Talisman	CD, DL	
Rune 097	September 1997	Otolithen	S.O.D.	CD	
Rune 098	September 1997	Forrest Fang	The Blind Messenger	CD	
Rune 099	September 1997	Djam Karet	The Devouring	CD, DL	
Rune 100	January 1998	Soft Machine	Virtually	CD	recorded 1971
Rune 101	June 1998	Rattlemouth	Fist Full of Iffy	CD	
Rune 102	June 1998	Mujician	Colours Fulfilled	CD	
Rune 103	September 1998	Elton Dean	Just Us	CD, DL	
Rune 104	June 1998	Hugh Hopper	1984	CD	originally released 1973
Rune 105	January 1998	Curlew	Fabulous Drop	CD, DL	
Rune 106	June 1998	Forever Einstein	One Thing After Another	CD	
Rune 107	January 1998	Present	Certitudes	CD	
Rune 108	January 1998	Miriodor	Rencontres	CD	
Rune 109	January 1999	Mother Mallard's Portable Masterpiece Company	1970-1973	CD	recorded 1970–1973
Rune 110	June 1999	Hughscore	Delta Flora	CD	
Rune 111	September 1998	Boud Deun	The Stolen Bicycle	CD, DL	
Rune 112	January 1999	Paul Dunmall Octet	Bebop Starburst	CD, DL	
Rune 113	September 1998	Thinking Plague	In Extremis	CD	
Rune 114	September 1998	Guigou Chenevier	Les Rumeurs de la Ville	CD, DL	
Rune 115	June 1999	Delivery	Fools Meeting	CD, DL	originally released 1970
Rune 116	January 1999	Motor Totemist Guild	City of Mirrors	CD	
Rune 117	June 1999	Fred Frith/Henry Kaiser	Friends & Enemies (disc 1)	CD	
Rune 118	June 1999	Fred Frith/Henry Kaiser	Friends & Enemies (disc 2)	CD	
Rune 119	June 1999	Djam Karet	Live at Orion	CD, DL	
Rune 120	October 1999	Univers Zero	The Hard Quest	CD	
Rune 121	October 1999	Von Zamla	1983	CD	
Rune 122	October 1999	The Hosemobile	What Can & Can't Go On	CD	
Rune 123	October 1999	Peter Frohmader/Richard Pinhas	Fossil Culture	CD	
Rune 124	June 1999	Philharmonie	The Last Word / Le Dernier Mot	CD	
Rune 125	October 1999	Blast	A Sophisticated Face	CD, DL	
Rune 126	May 2000	Doctor Nerve with the Sirius String Quartet	Ereia	CD, DL	
Rune 127	January 2000	George Cartwright/Amy Denio/Paul Haines	The Memphis Years: Terminal Moraine	CD, DL	
Rune 128	January 2000	Djam Karet	Burning the Hard City	CD, DL	originally released 1991
Rune 129	January 2000	Djam Karet	Suspension & Displacement	CD, DL	originally released 1991
Rune 130	January 2000	Soft Machine	Noisette	CD	recorded 1970
Rune 131	January 2000	Schizotrope	The Life & Death of Marie Zorn	CD	
Rune 132	May 2000	Rich Woodson's Ellipsis	Control & Resistance	CD	
Rune 133	September 2000	Piero Milesi	Within Himself	CD	
Rune 134	May 2000	Volapük	Polyglot	CD	
Rune 135	May 2000	Dave Kerman with 5uu's	Regarding Purgatories	CD	
Rune 136	May 2000	Forever Einstein	Down With Gravity	CD	
Rune 137	January 2001	Birdsongs of the Mesozoic	Petrophonics	CD, DL	
Rune 138	September 2000	The Danubians	The Danubians	CD, DL	
Rune 139	September 2000	Djam Karet	Reflections from the Firepool	CD, DL	originally released 1989
Rune 140	September 2000	Gilgamesh	Arriving Twice	CD	recorded 1973–1975
Rune 141	September 2000	Thinking Plague	Early Plague Years	CD	originally released 1984 & 1986
Rune 142	May 2001	Paul Dunmall Octet	The Great Divide	CD, DL	
Rune 143	January 2001	Elton Dean	Moorsong	CD, DL	recorded 1999
Rune 144	January 2001	Robert Creeley, Chris Massey, Steve Swallow, David CasT, David Torn	Have We Told You All You'd Thought To Know?	CD, DL	
Rune 145	January 2001	National Health	Playtime	CD	recorded 1979
Rune 146	January 2001	Hamster Theatre	Carnival Detournement	CD	
Rune 147	May 2001	Mother Mallard's Portable Masterpiece Company	Like A Duck To Water	CD	originally released 1976, plus bonus tracks
Rune 148	September 2001	Miriodor	Mekano	CD	
Rune 149	May 2001	Djam Karet	New Dark Age	CD, DL	
Rune 150	May 2001	Matching Mole	Smoke Signals	CD	recorded 1972
Rune 151	January 2001	The Stick Men	Insatiable	CD	
Rune 152	September 2001	Chris McGregor's Brotherhood of Breath	Travelling Somewhere	CD, DL	recorded 1973
Rune 153	September 2001	Picchio dal Pozzo	Camere Zimmer Rooms	CD	
Rune 154	January 2002	NeBeLNeST	NoVa eXPReSS	CD	
Rune 155	September 2001	Univers Zero	Crawling Wind	CD	originally released 1983
Rune 156	September 2001	Raoul Björkenheim	Apocalypso	CD, DL	
Rune 157	January 2002	Curlew	Meet The Curlews!	CD, DL	
Rune 158	January 2002	Dave Kerman with 5uu's	Abandonship	CD	
Rune 159	May 2002	Deus ex Machina	Cinque	CD, DL	
Rune 160	January 2002	Arkham	Arkham	CD	recorded 1970–1972
Rune 161	May 2002	The Muffins	Bandwidth	CD	
Rune 162	January 2002	Mujician	Spacetime	CD	
Rune 163	May 2002	various artists	156 Strings	CD	
Rune 164	September 2002	Sotos	Platypus	CD	
Rune 165	May 2002	Univers Zero	Rhythmix	CD	
Rune 166	September 2002	Richard Pinhas	Event and Repetitions	CD	
Rune 167	September 2002	Curlew	North America	CD, DL	
Rune 168	May 2003	Krakatoa	We Are the Rowboats	CD	
Rune 169	May 2003	Djam Karet	A Night for Baku	CD, DL	
Rune 170	May 2002	Soft Machine	Backwards	CD	recorded 1969–1970
Rune 171	September 2002	Proto-Kaw	Early Recordings from Kansas 1971–1973	CD	recorded 1971–1973
Rune 172	September 2002	Matching Mole	March	CD	
Rune 173	May 2003	Nucleus	Live in Bremen (disc 1)	CD	recorded 1971
Rune 174	May 2003	Nucleus	Live in Bremen (disc 2)	CD	recorded 1971
Rune 175	May 2003	Robert Wyatt	Solar Flares Burn For You	CD	
Rune 176	May 2003	Bone	Uses Wrist Grab	CD, DL	Hugh Hopper, Nick Didkovsky & John Roulat
Rune 177	September 2003	Curlew	Mercury	CD, DL	
Rune 178	May 2003	Larval	Obedience	CD	
Rune 179	September 2003	Birdsongs of the Mesozoic	The Iridium Controversy	CD, DL	
Rune 180	September 2003	Thinking Plague	A History of Madness	CD	
Rune 181	September 2003	In Cahoots	All That	CD	
Rune 182	January 2004	Chris McGregor's Brotherhood of Breath	Bremen to Bridgwater (disc 1)	CD, DL	
Rune 183	January 2004	Chris McGregor's Brotherhood of Breath	Bremen to Bridgwater (disc 2)	CD, DL	
Rune 184	January 2004	Guapo	Five Suns	CD	
Rune 185	January 2004	Ahvak	Ahvak	CD, DL	
Rune 186	January 2004	Richard Pinhas	Tranzition	CD	
Rune 187	January 2004	The Claudia Quintet	I, Claudia	CD, DL	
Rune 188	May 2004	University of Errors	Jet Propelled Photographs	CD	
Rune 189	May 2004	Gary Windo	Anglo American	CD	
Rune 190	May 2004	Univers Zero	Implosion	CD	
Rune 191	May 2004	Henry Kaiser & Wadada Leo Smith: Yo Miles!	Sky Garden (disc 1)	CD	
Rune 192	May 2004	Henry Kaiser & Wadada Leo Smith: Yo Miles!	Sky Garden (disc 2)	CD	
Rune 193	May 2004	Pip Pyle's Bash	Belle Illusion	CD	
Rune 194	September 2004	Far Corner	Far Corner	CD	
Rune 195	May 2004	Soft Machine	Live In Paris May 2nd 1972 (disc 1)	CD	recorded 1972
Rune 196	May 2004	Soft Machine	Live In Paris May 2nd 1972 (disc 2)	CD	recorded 1972
Rune 197	September 2004	Yang	A Complex Nature	CD	
Rune 198	September 2004	Richard Leo Johnson Trio	Poetry of Appliance	CD	
Rune 199	September 2004	The Muffins	Double Negative	CD, DL	
Rune 200	May 2005	John Surman	Way Back When	CD	recorded 1969
Rune 201	May 2004	Henry Kaiser & Wadada Leo Smith: Yo Miles!	Upriver (disc 1)	CD	
Rune 202	May 2004	Henry Kaiser & Wadada Leo Smith: Yo Miles!	Upriver (disc 2)	CD	
Rune 203	September 2004	Paul Dunmall Moksha Big Band	I Wish You Peace	CD, DL	
Rune 204	January 2005	Alec K. Redfearn and The Eyesores	The Quiet Room	CD	
Rune 205	January 2005	Fast 'N' Bulbous	Pork Chop Blue Around The Rind	CD	
Rune 206	January 2005	Forever Einstein	Racket Science	CD	
Rune 207	May 2005	Present	A Great Inhumane Adventure	CD	
Rune 208	January 2005	Miriodor	Parade (disc 1)	CD	
Rune 209	January 2005	Miriodor	Live at NEARFest (disc 2)	CD	recorded June 29, 2002
Rune 210	January 2005	Machine and the Synergetic Nuts	Leap Second Neutral	CD	
Rune 211	May 2005	Radio Massacre International	Emissaries (disc 1)	CD	
Rune 212	May 2005	Radio Massacre International	Emissaries (disc 2)	CD	
Rune 213	May 2005	Graham Collier	Workpoints (disc 1)	CD, DL	live 1968
Rune 214	May 2005	Graham Collier	Workpoints (disc 2)	CD, DL	live 1975
Rune 215	September 2005	Mats/Morgan Band	Thanks For Flying With Us	CD	
Rune 216	September 2005	NDIO	Airback	CD	Hugh Hopper guests
Rune 217	September 2005	The Claudia Quintet	Semi-Formal	CD, DL	
Rune 218	September 2005	Forgas Band Phenomena	Soleil 12	CD	
Rune 219	September 2005	Djam Karet	Recollection Harvest	CD, DL	
Rune 220	January 2006	Univers Zero	Live	CD	
Rune 221	January 2006	Ahleuchatistas	What You Will	CD, DL	
Rune 222	January 2006	Richard Leo Johnson	The Legend of Vernon McAlister	CD	
Rune 223	January 2006	Ray Russell	Goodbye Svengali	CD	
Rune 224	January 2006	Zaar	Zaar	CD	
Rune 225	May 2006	The Ed Palermo Big Band	Take Your Clothes Off When You Dance	CD	feat. music of Frank Zappa
Rune 226	May 2006	Hamster Theatre	The Public Execution of Mister Personality (disc 1)	CD	
Rune 227	May 2006	Hamster Theatre	Quasi Day Room: Live at the Moore Theatre (disc 2)	CD	live at Progman Cometh 2002
Rune 228	September 2006	Richard Pinhas	Metatron (disc 1)	CD	
Rune 229	September 2006	Richard Pinhas	Metatron (disc 2)	CD	
Rune 230	May 2006	Soft Machine	Grides (disc 1)	CD	recorded 25 October 1970
Rune 231	May 2006	Soft Machine	Grides (disc 2)	DVD	filmed 23 March 1971
Rune 232	September 2006	Mujician	There's No Going Back Now	CD	
Rune 233	May 2006	Harry Miller's Isipingo	Which Way Now	CD	
Rune 234	September 2006	NeBeLNeST	ZePTO	CD	
Rune 235	September 2006	Soft Machine	Middle Earth Masters	CD	recorded 1967 & 1968
Rune 236	September 2006	The Microscopic Septet	Seven Men in Neckties (disc 1)	CD	
Rune 237	September 2006	The Microscopic Septet	Seven Men in Neckties (disc 2)	CD	
Rune 238	September 2006	The Microscopic Septet	Surreal Swing (disc 1)	CD	
Rune 239	September 2006	The Microscopic Septet	Surreal Swing (disc 2)	CD	
Rune 240	January 2007	Hugh Hopper	Hopper Tunity Box	CD, DL	originally released 1977
Rune 241	September 2006	Birdsongs of the Mesozoic with Oral Moses	Extreme Spirituals	CD, DL	
Rune 242	January 2007	The Mahavishnu Project	Return To The Emerald Beyond (disc 1)	CD	
Rune 243	January 2007	The Mahavishnu Project	Return To The Emerald Beyond (disc 2)	CD	
Rune 244	May 2007	Alec K. Redfearn and The Eyesores	The Blind Spot	CD	
Rune 245	May 2007	Upsilon Acrux	Galapagos Momentum	CD	
Rune 246	January 2007	Far Corner	Endangered	CD	
Rune 247	May 2007	The Claudia Quintet	For	CD, DL	
Rune 248	January 2007	Larval/Bill Brovold	Surviving Death/Alive Why? (disc 1)	CD	
Rune 249	January 2007	Larval/Bill Brovold	Surviving Death/Alive Why? (disc 2)	CD	
Rune 250	May 2007	Steve Lacy Roswell Rudd Quartet	Early and Late (disc 1)	CD	
Rune 251	May 2007	Steve Lacy Roswell Rudd Quartet	Early and Late (disc 2)	CD	
Rune 252	May 2007	Graham Collier	Hoarded Dreams	CD, DL	
Rune 253	May 2007	Steve Miller/Lol Coxhill	Coxhill/Miller Miller/Coxhill (disc 1)	CD	
Rune 254	May 2007	Steve Miller/Lol Coxhill	The Story So Far..Oh Really? (disc 2)	CD	
Rune 255	September 2007	Vinny Golia, Aurora Josephson, Henry Kaiser, Mike Keneally, Joe Morris, Damon Smith, Weasel Walter	Healing Force: The Songs of Albert Ayler	CD	
Rune 256	September 2007	Radio Massacre International	Rain Falls in Grey	CD	
Rune 257	September 2007	Time of Orchids	Namesake Caution	CD	
Rune 258	September 2007	Richard Leo Johnson & Gregg Bendian	Who Knew Charlie Shoe?	CD	
Rune 259	September 2007	Deus ex Machina	Imparis (disc 1)	CD, DL	
Rune 260	September 2008	Deus ex Machina	Imparis (disc 2)	CD, DL	
Rune 261	September 2007	Ahleuchatistas	Even In the Midst...	CD, DL	
Rune 262	January 2008	Chris McGregor's Brotherhood of Breath	Eclipse at Dawn	CD, DL	
Rune 263	May 2008	Cosmologic	Eyes In The Back of My Head	CD, DL	
Rune 264	January 2008	Beat Circus	Dreamland	CD, DL	
Rune 265	January 2008	Mats/Morgan Band	Heat Beats Live + Tourbook 1991-2007 (disc 1)	CD	
Rune 266	January 2008	Mats/Morgan Band	Heat Beats Live + Tourbook 1991-2007 (disc 2)	CD	
Rune 267	January 2008	Mats/Morgan Band	Trends and Other Diseases	CD	
Rune 268	January 2008	Planeta Imaginario	Biomasa	CD	
Rune 269	May 2008	Revolutionary Snake Ensemble	Forked Tongue	CD	
Rune 270	May 2008	Wadada Leo Smith's Golden Quartet	Tabligh	CD	
Rune 271	May 2008	Lars Hollmer	Viandra	CD	
Rune 272	September 2008	The Microscopic Septet	Lobster Leaps In	CD	
Rune 273	September 2008	Isotope	Golden Section	CD	
Rune 274	September 2008	Birdsongs of the Mesozoic	Dawn of the Cycads (disc 1)	CD, DL	
Rune 275	September 2008	Birdsongs of the Mesozoic	Dawn of the Cycads (disc 2)	CD, DL	
Rune 276	January 2009	Cheer-Accident	Fears Draws Misfortune	CD, DL	
Rune 277	January 2009	Fast 'N' Bulbous	Waxed Oop	CD	
Rune 278	September 2008	Richard Pinhas & Merzbow	Keio Line (disc 1)	CD	
Rune 279	September 2008	Richard Pinhas & Merzbow	Keio Line (disc 2)	CD	
Rune 280	January 2009	Univers Zero	Relaps (Archives 1984-1986)	CD	
Rune 281	January 2009	Gutbucket	A Modest Proposal	CD	
Rune 282	January 2009	Forgas Band Phenomena	L'axe du fou/Axis of Madness	CD	
Rune 283	May 2009	Led Bib	Sensible Shoes	CD	
Rune 284	May 2009	Upsilon Acrux	Radian Futura	CD	
Rune 285	May 2009	The Ed Palermo Big Band	Eddy Loves Frank	CD	
Rune 286	May 2009	Positive Catastrophe	Garabatos Volume One	CD	
Rune 287	September 2009	Zevious	After The Air Raid	CD	
Rune 288	May 2009	Miriodor	Avanti	CD	
Rune 289	September 2009	Ergo	Multitude, Solitude	CD, DL	
Rune 290	September 2009	Wadada Leo Smith	Spiritual Dimensions (disc 1)	CD	
Rune 291	September 2009	Wadada Leo Smith	Spiritual Dimensions (disc 2)	CD	
Rune 292	September 2009	Jason Adasiewicz's Rolldown	Varmint	CD, LP, DL	ex-Living By Lanterns
Rune 293	January 2010	Brown vs. Brown	Odds and Unevens	CD, DL	
Rune 294	September 2009	Beat Circus	Boy From Black Mountain	CD, DL	
Rune 295	January 2010	Univers Zero	Clivages	CD	
Rune 296	May 2010	Ideal Bread	Transmit Vol.2 The Music of Steve Lacy	CD	
Rune 297	January 2010	Algernon	Ghost Surveillance	CD, DL	
Rune 298	January 2010	Radio Massacre International	Time & Motion (disc 1)	CD	
Rune 299	January 2010	Radio Massacre International	Time & Motion (disc 2)	CD	
Rune 300	January 2010	New York Art Quartet	Old Stuff	CD	
Rune 301	May 2010	Mats/Morgan Band	The Music or the Money? (disc 1)	CD	
Rune 302	May 2010	Mats/Morgan Band	The Music or the Money? (disc 2)	CD	
Rune 303	May 2010	Curlew	A Beautiful Western Saddle	CD + DVD, DL	originally Rune 50
Rune 304	May 2010	Curlew	The Hardwood	CD	originally VHS Rune 47
Rune 305	May 2010	Soft Machine	NDR Jazz Workshop (disc 1)	CD	recorded May 17, 1973
Rune 306	May 2010	Soft Machine	NDR Jazz Workshop (disc 2)	DVD	
Rune 307	May 2010	The Claudia Quintet with Gary Versace	Royal Toast	CD, DL	
Rune 308	September 2010	Richard Pinhas	Metal/Crystal (disc 1)	CD	
Rune 309	September 2010	Richard Pinhas	Metal/Crystal (disc 2)	CD	
Rune 310	September 2010	The Microscopic Septet	Friday the 13th: The Micros Play Monk	CD	
Rune 311	September 2010	Jason Robinson	The Two Faces of Janus	CD	
Rune 312	September 2010	Uz Jsme Doma	Jeskyne (Caves)	CD	
Rune 313	September 2010	Univers Zero	Heresie	CD	originally Rune 29
Rune 314	January 2011	Led Bib	Bring Your Own	CD	
Rune 315	January 2011	John Surman	Flashpoint: NDR Workshop (disc 1)	CD	recorded April 1969
Rune 316	January 2011	John Surman	Flashpoint: NDR Workshop (disc 2)	DVD	filmed April 1969
Rune 317	January 2011	Carlos DeRosa's Cross-fade	Brain Dance	CD, DL	
Rune 318	January 2011	Planeta Imaginario	Optical Delusions	CD	
Rune 319	May 2011	Gösta Berlings Saga	Glue Works	CD	
Rune 320	January 2012	Thinking Plague	Decline and Fall	CD	
Rune 321	January 2011	Gutbucket	Flock	CD	
Rune 322	January 2012	Michael Gibbs & The NDR Bigband	Back in the Days	CD	
Rune 323	September 2011	Dead Cat Bounce	Chance Episodes	CD. DL	
Rune 324	May 2011	Afuche	Highly Publicized Digital Boxing Match	CD, DL	
Rune 325	September 2011	São Paulo Underground	Tres Cabecas Loucuras	CD	
Rune 326	May 2011	Cheer-Accident	No Ifs Ands or Dogs	CD, DL	
Rune 327	September 2011	The Claudia Quintet	What Is the Beautiful?	CD, DL	
Rune 328	May 2011	Richard Pinhas & Merzbow	Rhizome	CD	
Rune 329	May 2011	Richard Pinhas & Merzbow	Paris 2008	CD	
Rune 330	May 2011	Wadada Leo Smith's Organic	Heart's Reflections (disc 1)	CD	
Rune 331	May 2011	Wadada Leo Smith's Organic	Heart's Reflections (disc 2)	CD	
Rune 332	January 2012	Forgas Band Phenomena	Acte V (disc 1)	CD	
Rune 333	January 2012	Forgas Band Phenomena	Acte V (disc 2)	CD	
Rune 334	January 2012	Joel Harrison, Lorenzo Feliciati, Cuong Vu, Roy Powell, Dan Weiss	Holy Abyss	CD	
Rune 335	September 2011	Bill Laswell/Raoul Björkenheim/Morgan Ågren	Blixt	CD	
Rune 336	May 2012	Positive Catastrophe	Dibrujo, Dibrujo, Dibrujo	CD	
Rune 337	September 2011	Mats/Morgan Band	Live	CD	
Rune 338	May 2012	Janel & Anthony	Where Is Home	CD	
Rune 339	January 2012	Ergo	If Not Inertia	CD, DL	
Rune 340	May 2012	Lars Hollmer	Med mjölad hand (skisser)/With Floury Hand (sketches) (disc 1)	CD	
Rune 341	May 2012	Lars Hollmer	Med mjölad hand (skisser)/With Floury Hand (sketches) (disc 2)	CD	
Rune 342	May 2012	Pixel	Reminder	CD	
Rune 343	September 2012	Steve Moore	Light Echoes	CD	
Rune 344	September 2012	Alec K. Redfearn and The Eyesores	Sister Death	CD	
Rune 345	September 2012	Living By Lanterns	New Myth/Old Science	CD	
Rune 346	September 2012	Jason Robinson, JD Parran, Marty Ehrlich, Marcus Rojas, Bill Lowe, Liberty Ellman, Drew Gress, George Schuller, Ches Smith	Tiresian Symmetry	CD	
Rune 347	September 2012	Ahleuchatistas	Heads Full of Poison	CD, DL	
Rune 348	September 2012	Christian Marclay, Toshio Kajiwara, DJ Olive	21 September 2002 Hirshhorn Museum	CD	
Rune 349	January 2013	Rob Mazurek Octet	Skull Sessions	CD	
Rune 350	May 2012	Wadada Leo Smith	Ten Freedom Summers (disc 1)	CD	
Rune 351	May 2012	Wadada Leo Smith	Ten Freedom Summers (disc 2)	CD	
Rune 352	May 2012	Wadada Leo Smith	Ten Freedom Summers (disc 3)	CD	
Rune 353	May 2012	Wadada Leo Smith	Ten Freedom Summers (disc 4)	CD	
Rune 354	January 2013	Guapo	History of the Visitation (disc 1)	CD	
Rune 355	January 2013	Guapo	History of the Visitation (disc 2)	CD	
Rune 356	January 2013	Curtis Hasselbring	Number Stations	CD, DL	
Rune 357	January 2013	Dylan Rand, Sand	Sky Bleached	CD, DL	
Rune 358	January 2013	Kandinsky Effect	Synesthesia	CD, DL	
Rune 359	May 2013	São Paulo Underground	Beija Flors Velho e Sujo	LP, CD, DL	
Rune 360	May 2013	S.O.S.	Looking For The Next One (disc 1)	CD, DL	S.O.S. = John Surman, Mike Osborn & Alan Skidmore
Rune 361	May 2013	S.O.S.	Looking For The Next One (disc 2)	CD, DL	
Rune 362	May 2013	Mats/Morgan Band	Radio Da Da/The Teenage Tapes (disc 1)	CD, DL	
Rune 363	May 2013	Mats/Morgan Band	Radio Da Da/The Teenage Tapes (disc 2)	CD, DL	
Rune 364	May 2013	Blue Cranes	Swim	CD, LP, DL	
Rune 365	January 2014	Mary Halvorson, Michael Formanek, Tomas Fujiwara	Thumbscrew	CD, DL	
Rune 366	May 2013	Richard Pinhas	Desolation Row	CD, DL	
Rune 367	September 2013	Zevious	Passing Through the Wall	CD, DL	
Rune 368	September 2013	Miriodor	Cobra Fakir	LP, CD, DL	
Rune 369	September 2013	Chrome Hoof	Chrome Black Gold	LP, CD, DL	
Rune 370	May 2014	The Microscopic Septet	Manhattan Moonrise	CD, DL	
Rune 371	September 2013	Tatvamasi	Parts of the Entirety	CD, DL	
Rune 372	September 2013	Pixel	We Are All Small Pixels	CD, DL	
Rune 373	January 2014	Raoul Björkenheim/eCsTaSy	eCsTaSy	CD, DL	
Rune 374	January 2014	SONAR	Static Motion	CD, DL	
Rune 375	September 2013	Robert Wyatt	68	LP, CD, DL	
Rune 376	October 2014	The Cellar and Point	Ambit	CD, DL	
Rune 377	September 2013	The Claudia Quintet	September	CD, DL	
Rune 378	May 2014	Led Bib	The People in Your Neighborhood	CD, DL	
Rune 379	May 2014	Led Bib	The Good Egg	LP, CD, DL	
Rune 380	January 2014	The Ed Palermo Big Band	Oh No! Not Jazz!! (disc 1)	CD, DL	
Rune 381	January 2014	The Ed Palermo Big Band	Oh No! Not Jazz!! (disc 2)	CD, DL	
Rune 382	January 2014	Present	Triskaidekaphobie	CD, DL	originally Rune 17
Rune 383	January 2014	Present	Le Poison Qui Rend Fou (disc 1)	CD, DL	originally Rune 003
Rune 384	January 2014	Present	Le Poison Qui Rend Fou (disc 2)	CD, DL	live 1/23/1982
Rune 385	May 2014	Mats/Morgan Band	[Schack Tati]	CD, DL	
Rune 386	May 2014	Ideal Bread	Beating the Teens (disc 1)	CD, DL	
Rune 387	May 2014	Ideal Bread	Beating the Teens (disc 2)	CD, DL	
Rune 388	May 2014	Richard Pinhas & Oren Ambarchi	Tikkun (disc 1)	CD, DL	
Rune 389	May 2014	Richard Pinhas & Oren Ambarchi	Tikkun (disc 2)	DVD	
Rune 390	May 2014	Joel Harrison	Mother Stump	CD, DL	
Rune 391	May 2014	Richard Pinhas & Yoshida Tatsuya	Welcome in the Void	CD, DL	
Rune 392	February 2015	Mike Osborne	'Dawn'	CD, DL	
Rune 393	October 2014	Happy Family	Minimal Gods	CD	
Rune 394	September 2014	Jonathan Badger	Verse	CD, LP	
Rune 395	February 2015	Soft Machine	Switzerland 1974 (disc 1)	CD	
Rune 396	February 2015	Soft Machine	Switzerland 1974 (disc 2)	DVD	
Rune 397	October 2014	Dylan Ryan/Sand	Circa	CD	
Rune 398	October 2014	Anthony Pirog/Michael Formanek/Ches Smith	Palo Colorado Dream	CD	
Rune 399	October 2014	Rob Mazurek/Black Cube SP	Return The Tides: Ascension Suite & Holy Ghost	CD, LP	featuring members of São Paulo Underground
Rune 400	June 2015	Michael Gibbs/NDR Bigband	Play A Bill Frisell Setlist	CD	
Rune 401	June 2015	Michael Gibbs/NDR Bigband	In My View	CD	
Rune 402	January 2015	Schnellertollermeier	X	CD	
Rune 403	February 2015	Henry Kaiser/Ray Russell	The Celestial Squid	CD	
Rune 404	May 2015	Guapo	Obscure Knowledge	CD, LP	
Rune 405	February 2016	Gary Lucas/Sarah Stiles	Gary Lucas' Fleischerei: Music from Max Fleischer Cartoons	CD	
Rune 406	October 2015	Adam Rudolph/GO: Organic Guitar Orchestra	Turning Toward The Light	CD	
Rune 407	October 2015	Thinking Plague	In This Life	CD	25th anniversary remaster
Rune 408	January 2015	The Kandinsky Effect	Sonambulist	CD	
Rune 409	May 2015	Rob Mazurek, Exploding Star Orchestra	Galactic Parables, Volume 1 (disc 1)	CD	
Rune 410	May 2015	Rob Mazurek, Exploding Star Orchestra	Galactic Parables, Volume 1 (disc 2)	CD	
Rune 411	October 2015	Le Rex	Wild Man		
Rune 412	October 2015	Pixel	Golden Years	CD, LP	
Rune 413	October 2015	Raoul Björkenheim/Ecstasy	Out Of The Blue	CD	
Rune 414	October 2015	SONAR	Black Light	CD, LP	
Rune 415	May 2016	Thumbscrew: Mary Halvorson/Michael Formanek/Tomas Fujiwara	Convalaria	CD	
Rune 416	February 2016	Empirical	Connection	CD	
Rune 417	May 2016	Bent Knee	Say So	CD, DL	
Rune 418	January 2016	Naima	Bye	CD, LP	
Rune 419	February 2016	Ergo	As Subtle As Tomorrow	CD	
Rune 420	January 2016	The Ed Palermo Big Band	One Child Left Behind	CD	
Rune 421	February 2017	Thinking Plague	Hoping Against Hope	CD	
Rune 422	June 2016	I.P.A.	I Just Did Say Something	CD	
Rune 423	October 2016	São Paulo Underground	Cantos Invisiveis	CD	
Rune 424	May 2016	Rez Abbasi/Junction	Behind The Vibration	CD	
Rune 425	February 2017	Microscopic Septet	Been Up So Long It Looks Like Down To Me: The Micros Play The Blues	CD	
Rune 426	September 2016	Richard Pinhas/Barry Cleveland/Michael Manring/Celso Alberti	Mu	CD	
Rune 427	June 2016	The Claudia Quintet	Super Petite	CD	
Rune 428	February 2017	Chicago/London Underground	A Night Walking Through Mirrors	CD	featuring Rob Mazurek
Rune 429	June 2016	Deus Ex Machina	Devoto	CD	
Rune 430	October 2016	Wadada Leo Smith	America's National Parks (disc 1)	CD	DownBeat's Album of the Year, 2017
Rune 431	October 2016	Wadada Leo Smith	America's National Parks (disc 2)	CD	
Rune 432	September 2016	Richard Pinhas/Tatsuya Yoshida/Masami Akita (Merzbow)	Process and Reality	CD	
Rune 433	May 2017	The Great Harry Hillman	Tilt	CD	
Rune 434	May 2017	Bubblemath	Edit Peptide	CD	
Rune 435	February 2017	The Ed Palermo Big Band	The Great Un-American Songbook Volumes I & II (disc 1)	CD	
Rune 436	February 2017	The Ed Palermo Big Band	The Great Un-American Songbook Volumes I & II (disc 2)	CD	
Rune 437		Joel Grind	Echoes in a Crystal Tomb		release cancelled
Rune 438	May 2017	Miriodor	Signal 9	CD	
Rune 439	June 2018	Thumbscrew: Mary Halvorson/Michael Formanek/Tomas Fujiwara	Ours	CD, DL	
Rune 440	October 2017	The Ed Palermo Big Band	The Adventures of Zodd Zundgren	CD	Music of Todd Rundgren and Frank Zappa
Rune 441	June 2018	Thumbscrew: Mary Halvorson/Michael Formanek/Tomas Fujiwara	Theirs	CD, DL	
Rune 442	October 2017	Schnellertollermeier	Rights	CD, LP, DL	
Rune 443	October 2017	Raoul Björkenheim/eCsTaSy	Doors of Perception	CD	
Rune 444	October 2018	Alec K. Redfearn and the Eyesores	The Opposite	CD, LP, DL	
Rune 445	May 10, 2019	The Spellcasters	Music From The Anacostia Delta	CD, DL	
Rune 446	May 2017	Cheer Accident	Putting Off Death	CD, LP	
Rune 447	October 2018	Forgas Band Phenomena	L'Oreille Electrique [The Electric Ear]	CD, DL	
Rune 448	May 10, 2019	Henry Kaiser/Anthony Pirog/Tracy Silverman/Jeff Sipe/Andy West	Five Times Surprise	CD, DL	
Rune 449	October 2018	Far Corner	Risk	CD, DL	
Rune 450	October 2017	Art Zoyd	44½: Live and Unreleased Works (CD 1)	CD	box set 12-CD + 2-DVD set all previously unreleased
Rune 451	October 2017	Art Zoyd	44½: Live and Unreleased Works (CD 2)	CD	
Rune 452	October 2017	Art Zoyd	44½: Live and Unreleased Works (CD 3)	CD	
Rune 453	October 2017	Art Zoyd	44½: Live and Unreleased Works (CD 4)	CD	
Rune 454	October 2017	Art Zoyd	44½: Live and Unreleased Works (CD 5)	CD	
Rune 455	October 2017	Art Zoyd	44½: Live and Unreleased Works (CD 6)	CD	
Rune 456	October 2017	Art Zoyd	44½: Live and Unreleased Works (CD 7)	CD	
Rune 457	October 2017	Art Zoyd	44½: Live and Unreleased Works (CD 8)	CD	
Rune 458	October 2017	Art Zoyd	44½: Live and Unreleased Works (CD 9)	CD	
Rune 459	October 2017	Art Zoyd	44½: Live and Unreleased Works (CD 10)	CD	
Rune 460	October 2017	Art Zoyd	44½: Live and Unreleased Works (CD 11)	CD	
Rune 461	October 2017	Art Zoyd	44½: Live and Unreleased Works (CD 12)	CD	
Rune 462	October 2017	Art Zoyd	44½: Live and Unreleased Works (DVD 1)	DVD	
Rune 463	October 2017	Art Zoyd	44½: Live and Unreleased Works (DVD 2)	DVD	
Rune 464	April 15, 2019	Le Rex	Escape of the Fire Ants	CD, DL	
Rune 465	October 4, 2019	Tomeka Reid Quartet	Old New	CD, DL	
Rune 466	October 4, 2019	Ghost Rhythms	Live At Yoshiwara	CD, DL	
Rune 467	April 24, 2020	Chad Taylor Trio	The Daily Biological	CD, DL	
Rune 468	October 16, 2020	Anthony Pirog	Pocket Poem	CD, DL	
Rune 469	April 24, 2020	Tatsuya Nakatani & Shane Parish	Interactivity	CD, DL	
Rune 470	November 13, 2020	A Love Supreme Electric: Vinny Golia, John Hanrahan, Henry Kaiser, Wayne Peet, Mike Watt	A Love Supreme	CD, LP, DL	
Rune 471	November 13, 2020	A Love Supreme Electric: Vinny Golia, John Hanrahan, Henry Kaiser, Wayne Peet, Mike Watt	Meditations	CD, LP, DL	
Rune 472	September 18, 2020	I.P.A.	Bashing Mushrooms	CD, LP, DL	
Rune 473	July 24, 2020	Stirrup+6	The Avondale Addition	CD, DL	
Rune 474	January 22, 2021	Bisbâyé	The Sense Of An Ending/Le Sens De La Fin	CD, DL	
Rune 475	July 24, 2020	Thumbscrew	The Anthony Braxton Project	CD, DL	
Rune 476	February 28, 2020	Cheer-Accident	Chicago XX	CD, DL	
Rune 477	May 28, 2021	Jack O' The Clock	Leaving California	CD, DL	
Rune 478	February 26, 2021	Thumbscrew	Never Is Enough	CD, LP, DL	the LP contains four live bonus tracks not available elsewhere
Rune 479	April 23, 2021	Desertion Trio	Numbers Maker	CD, DL	live at Firehouse 12 on October 18, 2019
Rune 480	October 22, 2021	Android Trio	Other Worlds	CD, DL	
Rune 481	June 25, 2021	The Fourth World Quartet	1975	CD, DL	
Rune 482	November 13, 2020	Schnellertollermeier	5	CD, LP, DL	
Rune 483	September 18, 2020	Ray Russell	Fluid Architecture	CD, LP, DL	
Rune 484	April 29, 2022	Balungan	Kudu Bisa Kudu	CD, DL	Balungan is drummer/composer Guigou Chenevier (Etron Fou Leloublan, Volapük (band)) with 5 other European musicians and 7 Indonesian musicians performing on gamelan
Rune 485	September 30, 2022	Thumbscrew	Multicolored Midnight	CD, LP, DL	
Rune 486	November 19, 2021	Ghost Rhythms	Spectral Music	CD, DL	
Rune 487	January 22, 2022	Luke Stewart's Silt Trio	The Bottom	CD, DL	
Rune 488	June 24, 2022	Bubblemath	Turf Ascension	CD, DL	
Rune 489	November 19, 2021	Accordo dei Contrari	UR-	CD, DL	
Rune 490	April 28, 2023	Soft Machine	The Dutch Lesson (disc 1)	CD, DL	Live Rotterdam, The Netherlands, October 26, 1973
Rune 491	April 28, 2023	Soft Machine	The Dutch Lesson (disc 2)	CD, DL	Live Rotterdam, The Netherlands, October 26, 1973
Rune 492	September 24, 2021	Mujician	10 10 10	CD, DL	
Rune 493	August 26, 2022	Roger Clark Miller	Eight Dream Interpretations for Solo Electric Guitar Ensemble	CD, LP, DL	
Rune 494	February 25, 2022	Yang	Designed for Disaster	CD, DL	
Rune 495	March 25, 2022	Soft Machine	Facelift France and Holland (CD #1, France)	CD, LP, DL	This is a remaster of the 3/70 'Pop Deux’ French TV Broadcast, taken from improved source materials, on both DVD & CD + a previously unreleased Dutch show from 1/70, all featuring the short-lived 5 piece version of the group, with Lyn Dobson
Rune 496	March 25, 2022	Soft Machine	Facelift France and Holland (DVD, France)	DVD	
Rune 497	March 25, 2022	Soft Machine	Facelift France and Holland (CD #2, Holland)	CD, LP, DL	
Rune 498	October 28, 2022	Miriodor	Elements	CD, DL	
Rune 499	July 29, 2022	Janel Leppin	Ensemble Volcanic Ash	CD, DL	
Rune 500	November 18, 2022	The Muffins	Baker's Dozen	CD, DL	Boxset with large booklet, all previously unreleased. Disc One: 1975
Rune 501	November 18, 2022	The Muffins	Baker's Dozen	CD, DL	Disc Two: late 1975, early 1976
Rune 502	November 18, 2022	The Muffins	Baker's Dozen	CD, DL	Disc Three: 1976
Rune 503	November 18, 2022	The Muffins	Baker's Dozen	CD, DL	Disc Four: 1977
Rune 504	November 18, 2022	The Muffins	Baker's Dozen	CD, DL	Disc Five: Oct 21, 1977 at W.A.F.U coffeehouse
Rune 505	November 18, 2022	The Muffins	Baker's Dozen	CD, DL	Disc Six: late 1977 & 1978
Rune 506	November 18, 2022	The Muffins	Baker's Dozen	CD, DL	Disc Seven: 1979, 1980
Rune 507	November 18, 2022	The Muffins	Baker's Dozen	CD, DL	Disc Eight: 1979–1981
Rune 508	November 18, 2022	The Muffins	Baker's Dozen	CD, DL	Disc Nine: 1994–2002
Rune 509	November 18, 2022	The Muffins	Baker's Dozen	CD, DL	Disc Ten: 2001–2004
Rune 510	November 18, 2022	The Muffins	Baker's Dozen	CD, DL	Disc Eleven: audio tracks from Rune 512
Rune 511	November 18, 2022	The Muffins	Baker's Dozen	CD, DL	Disc Twelve: 2004 & 2010
Rune 512	November 18, 2022	The Muffins	Baker's Dozen	DVD	NEARFest 2005 performance
Rune 513	August 30, 2024	Mother Mallard's Portable Masterpiece Company	Make Way For Mother Mallard	CD, DL	2-CD set, all previously released materials from the 1970s
Rune 514	August 30, 2024	Mother Mallard's Portable Masterpiece Company	Make Way For Mother Mallard	CD, DL	2-CD set, all previously released materials from 2019
Rune 515	January 31, 2025	John Surman	Flashpoints and Undercurrents	CD, DL	John Surman and ensemble [Kenny Wheeler, Ronnie Scott, Alan Skidmore, Mike Osborne, Harry Miller, Alan Jackson, etc.] recorded April 18, 1969 - a completely different and much longer recording than on ‘Flashpoint’
Rune 516	January 31, 2025	John Surman	Flashpoints and Undercurrents	CD, DL	John Surman and ensemble [Kenny Wheeler, Ronnie Scott, Alan Skidmore, Mike Osborne, Harry Miller, Alan Jackson, etc.] recorded April 18, 1969 - a completely different and much longer recording than on ‘Flashpoint’
Rune 517	March 29, 2024	Present	this is NOT the end	CD, DL	
Rune 518	June 30, 2023	Location Location Location	Damaged Goods	CD, DL	first release by a trio of Anthony Pirog (guitar), Michael Formanek (bass/electric bass), Mike Pride (drums)
Rune 519	November 24, 2023	French TV	French TV 15: A Ghastly State of Affairs	CD, DL	
Rune 520	September 27, 2024	Thumbscrew	Wingbeats	CD, DL	
Rune 521	January 30, 2026	Mike Johnson	The Garden of Loss	CD, DL	Mike of Thinking Plague
Rune 522	September 29, 2023	I.P.A.	Grimstas	CD, DL	
Rune 523	January 26, 2024	Antistatic	Relics	CD, DL	debut
Rune 524	July 26, 2024	Yang	Rejoice	LP, CD, DL	features vocalist Carla Kihlstedt of Tin Hat
Rune 525	April 26, 2024	Tomeka Reid Quartet	3+3	CD, vinyl, DL	
Rune 526	February 23, 2024	Cheer-Accident	Vacate	CD, DL	
Rune 527	June 28, 2024	Janel & Anthony	New Moon In The Evil Age (disc 1)	LP, CD, DL	2-LP, 2-CD set
Rune 528	June 28, 2024	Janel & Anthony	New Moon In The Evil Age (disc 2)	LP, CD, DL	2-LP, 2-CD set
Rune 529	June 28, 2024	Janel Leppin	Ensemble Volcanic Ash: To March Is To Love	LP, CD, DL	
Rune 530	May 31, 2024	Soft Machine	Høvikodden 1971	LP, CD, DL	the entire two-night stand released for the first time
Rune 531	May 31, 2024	Soft Machine	Høvikodden 1971	LP, CD, DL	the entire two-night stand released for the first time
Rune 532	May 31, 2024	Soft Machine	Høvikodden 1971	LP, CD, DL	the entire two-night stand released for the first time
Rune 533	May 31, 2024	Soft Machine	Høvikodden 1971	LP, CD, DL	the entire two-night stand released for the first time
Rune 534	April 25, 2025	Luke Stewart	Silt Remembrance Ensemble	CD, DL	Luke Stewart, Daniel Carter, Brian Settles, Jamal Moore, Chad Taylor
Rune 535	November 21, 2025	Gilles Laval	100 Guitares sur un Bateau Ivre [100 Guitars on a Drunken Boat]	CD, DL	
Rune 536	October 30, 2026	Ghost Rhythms	Missing Times	CD, DL	
Rune 537	October 25, 2024	Radio Massacre International	Galactic Furnace	CD, DL	
Rune 538	October 25, 2024	Radio Massacre International	Galactic Furnace	CD, DL	
Rune 539	May 30, 2025	Skullcap	Snakes of Albuquerque	LP, CD, DL	Mike Kuhl, Janel Leppin, Anthony Pirog
Rune 540	October 31, 2025	Trinary System	The Hard Machine	CD, DL	Roger Miller of Mission of Burma and Birdsongs of the Mesozoic
Rune 541	August 29, 2025	Led Bib	Hotel Pupik	CD, DL	
Rune 542	June 27, 2025	Heat On	Heat On	CD, DL	
Rune 543	February 25, 2025	Roger Clark Miller	Curiosity for Solo Electric Guitar Ensemble	CD, DL	
Rune 544	April 24, 2026	French TV	The Spanish Caper (disc 1)	CD	One album of original material
Rune 545	April 24, 2026	French TV	The Spanish Caper (disc 2)	CD	and one album of ‘deep influencial cuts’ from the late 60s/early 70s
Rune 546	May 29, 2026	Cheer Accident	You Smile – The Song Is Over (Disc 1)	CD, DL	
Rune 547	May 26, 2026	Cheer Accident	You Smile – The Song Is Over (Disc 2)	DVD, DL	DVD of two live concerts: April 2, 2022 & September 16, 2023
Rune 548	June 26, 2026	Henrik Olsson	Antumbra Ensemble	CD, DL	
Rune 549	September 26, 2025	Revolutionary Snake Ensemble	Serpentine	CD, DL	
Rune 550	April 30, 2026	Aymeric Leroy	Legends In Their Own Lunchtime : An Exploration of the Canterbury Scene	book	
Rune 552	August 28, 2026	Heat On	150 Swirl	CD, DL	
Rune 553	September 25, 2026	Ray Russell	Dangerous Bends	CD, DL	
Rune 558	March 27, 2026	Janel Leppin / Ensemble Volcanic Ash	Pluto in Neptune	CD, vinyl, DL	Third from this DC art / classical / jazz ensemble
Rune 559	March 27, 2026	Janel Leppin	Slowly Melting	CD, vinyl, DL	solo cello with effects and overdubs
Rune 560	January 29, 2027	A Love Supreme Electric	The Beauty and the Terror : A Love Supreme Electric Plays the Music of Sonny Sharrock	CD, double vinyl, DL	Vinny Golia, John Hanrahan, Henry Kaiser, Wayne Peet, Anthony Pirog, Mike Watt
Rune 562	November 13, 2026	Schnellertollermeier	Shadow Web	CD, double vinyl, DL	
Rune 1313	May 2008	Univers Zero	Univers Zero (1313)	CD	originally released 1977 as “Univers Zero” and 1989 as Rune 020
Rune 3334	2010	Hugh Hopper	The Gift of Purpose	CD, DL	live Bone recordings 2008, benefit CD for HH's family
Rune 3335	August 2019	Alec K. Redfearn and the Eyesores	May You Dine On Weeds Made Bitter By The Piss Of Drunkards	DL	originally released 1999
Rune 3336	August 2019	Alec K. Redfearn and the Eyesores	Bents At The Waist	DL	originally released 2002
Rune 3337	August 2019	Alec K. Redfearn and the Eyesores	Every Man For Himself & God Against All	DL	originally released 2006
Rune 3338	August 2019	Alec K. Redfearn and the Eyesores	The Smother Party	DL	originally released 2006
Rune 3339	August 2019	Alec K. Redfearn and the Eyesores	Exterminating Angel	DL	originally released 2009
Rune 3340	October 19, 2019	Richard Leo Johnson	The Sleeping Porch	DL	originally released (cassette only) 1988
Rune 3341	October 19, 2019	Richard Leo Johnson	Glidepath	DL	originally released (cassette only) 1990
Rune 3342	November 1, 2019	Upsilon Acrux	In The Acrux Of The Upsilon King	DL	originally released 1999
Rune 3343	November 1, 2019	Upsilon Acrux	The Last Pirates of Upsilon	DL	originally released 1999
Rune 3344	November 1, 2019	Upsilon Acrux	Last Train Out	DL	originally released 2002
Rune 3345	November 1, 2019	Upsilon Acrux	Volucris Avis Dirae-Arum	DL	originally released 2004
Rune 3346	January 31, 2020	Thinking Plague	Upon Both Your Houses	DL	live NEARFest 2000
Rune 3347	January 31, 2020	Birdsongs of the Mesozoic	2001 Live Birds	DL	live NEARFest 2001
Rune 3348	March 19, 2021	Alan Gowen & Hugh Hopper	Bracknell－Bresse Improvisations	DL	recorded 1978, originally released 1996
Rune 3349	March 19, 2021	Gabriel Borden	Borden on Borden : Gabriel Borden plays David Borden	DL	
Rune 3350	March 19, 2021	David Borden	Heaven-Kept Soul	DL	
Rune 3351	July 23, 2021	No Safety	Spill	DL	Zeena Parkins band, originally released 1992
Rune 3352	July 23, 2021	No Safety	Live at The Knitting Factory	DL	originally released 1993
Rune 3353	July 23, 2021	No Safety	Live in Italy	DL	
Rune 3354	August 27, 2021	Ray Russell	Secret Asylum	DL	originally released 1973
Rune 3355	August 27, 2021	David Borden	Cayuga Night Music	DL	originally released 1993
Rune 3356	August 27, 2021	David Borden	Smart Hubris	DL	
Rune 3357	December 17, 2021	Rick Biddulph	Second Nature	DL	originally released 1994
Rune 3358	December 17, 2021	Le Tout Sur Le Tout	All About All	DL	previously unreleased concert recording
Rune 3359	August 12, 2022	Ken Field & Alieno deBootes (Alessandro Pizzin)	Alien Field	DL	
Rune 3360	September 16, 2022	The Fourth World Quartet	Grand Bland Vapid Rapids	DL	
Rune 3361	May 27, 2022	Dave Kerman / 5uu's	The Quiet in your Bones	DL	
Rune 3362	May 27, 2022	Curlew	CBGBs, NYC, 1987	DL	live recording
Rune 3363	May 27, 2022	Curlew	Live at Phantasmagoria / WFMU	DL	two shows live 1998 and 1997
Rune 3364	May 27, 2023	Nick Macri & Mono No Aware	Amache	DL	
Rune 3365	July 28, 2023	Picchio dal Pozzo	In Camporella	DL	live 2004
Rune 3366	July 28, 2023	A Light Sleeper	Equaeverpoise	DL	
Rune 3367	July 28, 2023	Rascal Reporters	The Strainge Case of Steve	DL	
Rune 3369	November 22, 2024	Angling	Was It 1984 or 1985?	DL	short lived band from 1984 or 1985 with no previous recordings available: Zeena Parkins – accordion and acoustic harp, George Cartwright – soprano saxophone, Chris Cochrane – electric guitar and tapes, Fred Chalenor - bass
Rune 3370	October 27, 2023	Curlew	Taklos Festival 1986 / CBGBs 1987	DL	
Rune 3371	March 28, 2025	Curlew	East/West/Also	DL	
Rune 3372	December 29, 2023	Ahleuchatistas	The Summer We Went West [and East]	DL	archival live 2006
Rune 3373	August 25, 2023	Heretic (Hiro Kawahara)	1984-1988	DL	compilation prev. released 1994, with bonus material
Rune 3374	August 25, 2023	Heretic (Hiro Kawahara)	Yayoi Dream	DL	prev. released 1996, with bonus material
Rune 3375	August 25, 2023	Heretic (Hiro Kawahara)	Interface	DL	prev. released 1985, with bonus material
Rune 3376	August 25, 2023	Heretic (Hiro Kawahara)	Drugging For M	DL	prev. released 1997, with bonus material
Rune 3377	August 25, 2023	Heretic (Hiro Kawahara)	Past In Future	DL	Demo and live in studio recordings of 'Yayoi Dream' and 'Drugging for M', originally a limited release in 1996, with bonus material
Rune 3378	August 25, 2023	Heretic (Hiro Kawahara)	Escape Sequence	DL	prev. released 1988, with bonus material
Rune 3379	August 25, 2023	Hiro Kawahara & Peter Frohmader	Hiro Kawahara & Peter Frohmader	DL	previously unreleased
Rune 3380	August 25, 2023	Heretic (Hiro Kawahara)	Requiem	DL	prev. released 2010, with bonus material
Rune 3381	August 25, 2023	Heretic (Hiro Kawahara)	Live Kyoto '85 and Tokyo ’88	DL	previously unreleased
Rune 3382	August 25, 2023	Heretic (Hiro Kawahara)	Complete Works	DL	
Rune 3383	October 27, 2023	Volapük	Pükapök	DL	Live in Poland 1998, originally released in 1999 as ltd. edition of 999
Rune 3384	November 22, 2024	Volapük	Where is Tamashii?	DL	their final album
Rune 3385	October 27, 2023	5uu's	Live at A.K.W. Wurzburg, Germany	DL	April 8, 1995
Rune 3386	December 29, 2023	Pascal Globensky	Zigzag	DL	first solo by Miriodor man
Rune 3387	December 29, 2023	NeBeLNeST	NeBeLNeST	DL	remixed reissue of their first album
Rune 3389	February 27, 2026	NeBeLNeST	Saalfelden 2007	DL	Their final live appearance
Rune 3390	October 27, 2023	Itolken / Klimperei / Frank Pahl	IKP	DL	
Rune 3391	December 29, 2023	Forgas Band Phenomena	Roue Libre	DL	reissue of their first from 1997
Rune 3392	December 29, 2023	Forgas Band Phenomena	Zigzag	DL	reissue of their 2nd from 1999
Rune 3393	November 22, 2024	Denman Maroney	Nits Musica	DL	
Rune 3394	March 28, 2025	Chris Cochrane/Collapsible Shoulder Big Band	Live 2019: A Map of Books	DL	
Rune 3395	November 22, 2024	Dirk Bruinsma	Low Reliefs	DL	
Rune 3396	March 28, 2025	Forgas	Cocktail	DL	
Rune 3397	July 25, 2025	SWRM	Lights Out	DL	
Rune 3398	March 28, 2025	The Reference Group	File Under Unpopular	DL	
Rune 3399	July 25, 2025	Rosa Ensemble	Oddments	DL	
Rune 3400	July 25, 2025	Balloons for the Dog	Wicked Forms of Old Snow	DL	
Rune 3401	July 25, 2025	Krakhouse	Bastards of Prog	DL	
Rune 3402	July 25, 2025	Miriodor	Live 97	DL	
Rune 3403	July 25, 2025	Tinn Parrow & Co./Laurence Bond Miller	My Gymnasium Museum	DL	
Rune 3404	July 31, 2026	Michael Columbia	Mirrors, Shapes, Objects	DL	
Rune 3405	July 31, 2026	Boud Doun	Pronounced Booed Dee-un	DL	live 4/97
Rune 3406	July 31, 2026	Honey Ride Me A Goat	Horses and Hooves	DL	
Rune 3407	February 27, 2026	Nathan Moore / Eddie Prévost / Ray Russell	Stacked	DL	Improvised trio of two guitars and drums by a relative newcomer and two legends in the field
Rune 3408	February 27, 2026	Frédéric L’Épée	Contre courant	DL	"12 pieces for solo electric guitar” by the guitarist/leader of Yang & Shylock
Rune 3409	February 27, 2026	Denman Maroney	Mean Times	DL	Herb Robertson – trumpet / Ellery Eskelin – tenor saxophone / Denman Maroney – composition and sampled hyperpiano / Mark Dresser – bass / Phil Haynes – drums. Recorded April 11, 1995 live in concert at the Knitting Factory, New York NY
Rune 3410	July 31, 2026	Chris Cochrane / Kevin Bud Jones	Live in Seattle	DL	
Rune 3411	February 27, 2026	b.mez	Under Circuitous Skies	DL	b.mez is an improvising project developed by members of Birdsongs of the Mesozoic: Michael Bierylo, Ken Field, Rick Scott, and for this recording, Roger Miller, the original co-founder of Birdsongs.
Rune 3412	July 31, 2026	Lucas and Lukas (Gary Lucas & Lukas Ligeti)	Omnidirectional	DL	
Rune 4037	March 28, 2025	Happy Family	4037 (EP)	DL	
Rune 4038	August 1, 2025	Happy Family	Flowing Yet Cunning / Fort Of Responsibility	DL	
Rune 4039	October 13, 2025	Happy Family	Walking Through The Mire / The Dark Forest (draft)	DL	
Rune 4138	November 13, 2026	Happy Family	Live 4138	DL	

=== Archival releases ===
Note: The first few reissues came out as "Wayside Music Archive Series" releases

No.	Year	Artist(s)	Title	Format	Notes
55001/WMAS1	February 1990	Happy The Man	3rd: Better Late...	CD	recorded 1979
55002/WMAS2	February 1990	Doctor Nerve	Did Sprinting Die?	CD, DL	live 6/14/1989
55003/WMAS3	December 1990	Happy The Man	Beginnings	CD	recorded 1974 & 1975
55004/WMAS4	December 1990	The Muffins	Manna/Mirage	CD	originally released 1978
55005	March 1995	Cartoon	Sortie	CD, DL	reissues Cartoon (1981) and Music from Left Field (1983)
55006/WMAS6	May 1991	Hugh Hopper Band	Meccano Pelorus	CD	recorded 1987 & 1989
55007	January 1993	The Muffins	Chronometers	CD	recorded 1975 & 76
55008	March 1993	Grits	As The World Grits	CD	recorded 1970–1975
55009	January 1995	Steve Tibbetts	Steve Tibbetts	CD	originally released 1977
55010	January 1994	The Muffins	Open City	CD	originally released 1985
55011	January 1993	various artists	Transforms: The Nerve Events Project	CD	25 artists compose using samples from Doctor Nerve's Beta 14 OK release
55012	January 1997	Grits	Rare Birds	CD	recorded 1976
55013	January 1996	The Muffins	185	CD	originally released 1981
55014	January 1997	Happy The Man	Live	CD	recorded July 1, 1978 at The Cellar Door, Washington DC and October 8, 1978, at Louie's Rock City, Bailey's Crossroads, VA
55015	January 1999	Happy The Man	Death's Crown	CD	recorded in 1974 & 1976

=== Samplers ===
No.	Year	Artist(s)	Title	Format
9001	2000	various artists	Canterbury & Beyond: Selected Runes	CD
9002	2002	various artists	An Introduction to Cuneiform Records: Selections from All of Our 2002 Releases and More	CD
Promo 1	2003	various artists	Cuneiform Records Promo No.1	CD
Promo 2	2004	various artists	Cuneiform Progressive 2	CD
Promo 3	2005	various artists	Cuneiform Records Sampler 3	CD
Sampler 1	2006	various artists	Wayside Sampler	CD
Sampler 2	2007	various artists	Wayside Sampler #2	CD
Sampler 3	2007	various artists	Wayside Sampler #3	CD
Sampler 4	2008	various artists	Wayside Sampler #4	CD
Sampler 5	2008	various artists	Wayside Sampler #5	CD
Sampler 6	2009	various artists	Wayside Sampler #6	CD
	November 25, 2014	various artists	Cuneiform Turns 30: The Albums of 2014	DL
	December 18, 2015	various artists	The Albums of 2015	DL
	November 14, 2016	various artists	The Albums of 2016	DL
	December 20, 2017	various artists	The Albums of 2017	DL
	January 4, 2019	various artists	The Albums of 2018	DL
	February 3, 2020	various artists	The Albums of 2019	DL
	January 18, 2021	various artists	The Albums of 2020	DL

== Artists ==
Artists who have released albums or reissues on the label:

- Rez Abbasi
- Accordo dei Contrari
- Afuche
- Morgan Ågren
- Ahleuchatistas
- Ahvak
- Arkham
- Jonathan Badger
- Beat Circus
- Bent Knee
- Rick Biddulph
- Birdsongs Of The Mesozoic
- Raoul Björkenheim
- Blast
- Blixt (Bill Laswell, Raoul Björkenheim, Morgan Ågren)
- Blue Cranes
- Bone
- Boom
- David Borden / Mother Mallard's Portable Masterpiece Company
- Boud Deun
- Chris McGregor's Brotherhood of Breath
- Bubblemath
- Cartoon (Scott Brazieal, Herb Diamant, Craig Fry, Mark Innocenti, Gary Parra)
- George Cartwright
- The Cellar and Point
- Chainsaw Jazz
- Cheer-Accident
- Guigou Chenevier
- Chrome Hoof
- The Claudia Quintet
- Graham Collier
- Cosmologic
- Robert Creeley
- Curlew
- The Danubians
- Carlo De Rosa's Cross-Fade
- Dead Cat Bounce
- Elton Dean
- Delivery
- Daniel Denis
- Deus ex Machina
- Djam Karet
- Doctor Nerve
- Paul Dunmall Octet
- Empirical
- Ergo
- Exploding Star Orchestra
- Forrest Fang
- Far Corner
- Fast 'N' Bulbous
- Forever Einstein
- Forgas Band Phenomena
- Michael Formanek
- Fred Frith / Henry Kaiser
- Peter Frohmader
- Ghost Rhythms
- Michael Gibbs
- Gilgamesh
- The Great Harry Hillman
- Grits
- Gösta Berlings Saga
- Guapo
- Gutbucket
- Mary Halvorson
- Hamster Theatre
- Happy Family
- Happy the Man
- Joel Harrison
- Curtis Hasselbring
- Healing Force
- Heldon
- Lars Hollmer
- Hugh Hopper
- The Hosemobile
- Hughscore
- Ideal Bread
- I.P.A.
- Harry Miller 's Isipingo
- Isotope
- Janel and Anthony
- Richard Leo Johnson
- Henry Kaiser
- Dave Kerman / 5uu's
- The Kandinsky Effect
- Kombinat M
- Krakatoa
- Steve Lacy - Roswell Rudd Quartet
- Bill Brovold's Larval
- Bill Laswell
- Le Rex
- Led Bib
- Living By Lanterns (co-led by Jason Adasiewicz and Mike Reed)
- Gary Lucas' Fleischerei, featuring Sarah Stiles
- Machine and the Synergetic Nuts
- The Mahavishnu Project
- Christian Marclay / Toshio Kajiwara / DJ Olive: djTRIO
- Rob Mazurek
- Matching Mole
- Mats/Morgan Band
- The Microscopic Septet
- Piero Milesi
- Phil Miller / In Cahoots
- Steve Miller / Lol Coxhill
- Miriodor
- Steve Moore
- Virgil Moorefield
- Motor Totemist Guild
- The Muffins
- Mujician
- Naima
- National Health
- NDIO
- NeBeLNeST
- No Safety
- Nucleus
- Mike Osborne
- Otolithen
- Ed Palermo Big Band
- PFS (Scott Brazieal, Herb Diamant, Craig Fry, Bill Johnston, Gary Parra)
- Philharmonie
- Picchio dal Pozzo
- Richard Pinhas
- Anthony Pirog
- Pixel
- Planeta Imaginario
- Positive Catastrophe
- Present
- Proto-Kaw
- Pip Pyle's Bash!
- Radio Massacre International
- Rattlemouth
- Alec K. Redfearn & The Eyesores
- Revolutionary Snake Ensemble
- Jason Robinson
- Adam Rudolph / Go: Organic Guitar Orchestra
- Ray Russell
- Dylan Ryan / Sand
- São Paulo Underground
- Schnellertollermeier
- Siamese Stepbrothers
- Wadada Leo Smith
- Soft Machine
- SONAR
- S.O.S. (Alan Skidmore, Mike Osborne, John Surman)
- Sotos
- Stick Men
- John Surman
- Tatvamasi
- Thinking Plague
- Thumbscrew: Mary Halvorson, Michael Formanek, Tomas Fujiwara
- Steve Tibbetts
- Time of Orchids
- Le Tout Sur Le Tout
- U Totem
- Univers Zero
- University of Errors
- Upsilon Acrux
- Uz Jsme Doma
- Volapük
- Von Zamla
- C. W. Vrtacek
- Gary Windo
- Rich Woodson's Ellipsis
- Robert Wyatt
- Yang
- Zaar
