= Stickmen =

Stickman, stick man, stickmen or stick men may refer to:

== Arts and entertainment ==
- Stick figure, a simple line drawing that represents a human being
- Stickmen (film), a 2001 New Zealand film directed by Hamish Rothwell
- Stick Man, a children's book written by Julia Donaldson and illustrated by Axel Scheffler
- Stick Men (punk band), an early 1980s new wave band from Philadelphia
- Stick Men (prog band), a progressive rock band formed in 2007 by members of King Crimson
- Stick Man (album), an album by Tony Levin

== Other uses ==
- Stickman Graphics, a Brooklyn-based publisher of graphic novels and how-to books
- Eberlein Drive, known as The Stickmen in 2017, an American basketball team
- Based Stickman, a nom-de-guerre of felon white supremacist activist Kyle Chapman
