= Upsilon Acrux =

Progressive rock band from California

- Origin: Los Angeles, California, U.S.
- Genres: Progressive rock, rock in Opposition, zeuhl, noise rock
- Years active: 1998–present
- Labels: Cuneiform Records, Planaria Recordings
- Members: Paul Lai; Dylan Fujioka; Noah Guevara; Mark Kimbrell; Patrick Shiroishi
- Past members: see below

Upsilon Acrux is an American progressive rock band from Los Angeles formed in 1998.

== History ==
Upsilon Acrux first appeared on record on a 1998 compilation entitled Trummerflora 2. Soon after they contributed a song to a compilation entitled Before the Pirates Came. They went from a 4-piece to a 3-piece before releasing 2002's Last Train Out. They expanded to a five-piece, including two drummers for Volucris Avis Dirae-Arum in 2004. By 2005 they had done away with the dual-drummer setup, and signed with Cuneiform Records later in the year. 2007 saw the release of their first album for Cuneiform, Galapagos Momentum. They released their sixth full-length album, entitled Radian Futura, on May 19, 2009. In 2015, on April 14, they released a new album called Sun Square Dialect.

== Releases ==
=== Galapagos Momentum ===
The lineup of Applehans, Kiersnowski (the King), Lai and Miller (Ice) performed for two years, recording Galapagos Momentum in 2006. Before the recording was pressed, a new incarnation was assembled with Cobb (McEnroe, Bart Garfunkel), Lai, Meszler (Mezz, Meszloforte), Moeggenberg (Moeggen) and Sataman (Martron, Marty-Party) in March 2007. This new lineup promoted Galapagos throughout the U.S. in summer 2007. The album was critically acclaimed, earning a number 2 position on Organ Magazine's end of the year album list. The group would share stages with The Locust, Qui, Tatsuya Yoshida, Polar Goldie Cats, The Mae Shi, Ancestors, HEALTH, Abe Vigoda, Weasel Walter, and Cheer-Accident.

On November 17, 2007, Upsilon Acrux played the Barking Tuna Fest in Kalamazoo, MI. Mission of Burma followed.

=== Radian Futura ===
In December 2007, Upsilon began work on their magnum opus, "Transparent Seas (Radio Edit)". On June 6, 2008, the song was premiered at Cafe Mariposa in Echo Park, CA.

Radian Futura was released on CD by Cuneiform and in September 2009 on vinyl by Thin Wrist Recordings. Upsilon promoted the album nationally and on a month-long jaunt in Europe, autumn 2009. The album was met with critical acclaim, and the band shared stages with Yowie, Ahleuchatistas, Zs, Bad Dudes, Peter Brötzmann, Honey Ride Me a Goat, Nels Cline, Carla Bozulich, Extra Life, Adebisi Shank, and Peter Kolovos.

On September 18, 2009, Upsilon performed for a crowd of over 400 at the Gertje Fest 5 at the Landbouwebelang in Maastricht.

Upon the group's return from its European tour, Upsilon Acrux performed a 70-minute set at The Smell. The concert was professionally mixed and recorded.

== Personnel ==
Paul Lai has remained with the group since its inception.

Current lineup (2010–present)

- Paul Lai – guitar
- Noah Guevara – guitar
- Patrick Shiroishi- Rhodes/sax
- Mark Kimbrell – drums
- Dylan Fujioka – drums

Founding members

- Paul Lai – guitar, Moog
- Cameron Presley – guitars, Moog
- Tommy Cutler – bass, vocals

Former Members

- Chris Meszler – drums
- David Moeggenberg – guitar
- Phil Cobb – Moog
- Marty Sataman – bass
- Jesse (Klecker) Applehans – drums
- Eric Kiersnowski – bass
- Nick Lejejs – Moog
- Brady Miller – guitar
- Josh Quon – bass
- Muir Tennerstet – bass
- Derek Bruns – drums

Guest musicians

- Devin Sarno – bass (Last Pirates of Upsilon)
- Bobb Bruno – bass (Last Pirates of Upsilon, Last Train Out)
- Glen (Galaxy) Galloway – baritone sax (In the Acrux of the Upsilon King)
- Brady Miller- drums, drum programming (Radian Futura)
- Mike Armstrong – saxophone (Radian Futura, White LP)
- Peter Kolovos – guitar (White LP)
- Elvis Presley – harmonica (Last Pirates of Upsilon)

== Discography ==
- 1999 In the Acrux of the Upsilon King (Accretions Records)
- 1999 The Last Pirates of Upsilon (Win Records)
- 2002 Last Train Out (Hactivist Records)
- 2004 Volucris Avis Dirae-Arum (Planaria Recordings CD / Epicene Records vinyl)
- 2006 Last Train Out (Daft Alliance vinyl reissue)
- 2007 Galapagos Momentum (Cuneiform Records)
- 2009 Radian Futura (Cuneiform Records)
- 2009 White LP (split w/ Honey Ride Me A Goat) (Kitchen Dweller Records)
- 2015 Sun Square Dialect (New Atlantis Records)
