= Joseph Branciforte =

American musician (born 1985)

- Born: June 11, 1985 (age 40); Ramsey, New Jersey, U.S.
- Genres: Electronic • experimental • ambient • chamber music • jazz
- Occupations: record producer, musician
- Years active: 2010–present
- Label: greyfade
- Website: josephbranciforte.com

Joseph Branciforte (born 1985) is an American musician, composer, record producer, and Grammy-winning recording engineer. He is the founder of the greyfade record label.

== Biography ==
Branciforte grew up in a suburb of New York City studying drums and piano. He began experimenting with recording and electronic music at an early age, before attending Berklee College of Music to study Electronic Production and Design.

After returning to New York, Branciforte began a career as a freelance recording engineer, working on albums for Ben Monder, Tim Berne, Vijay Iyer, Nels Cline, Craig Taborn, Mary Halvorson, Steve Lehman, and JACK Quartet, among others.

In 2010, he formed the "garage-chamber" ensemble The Cellar and Point with guitarist Christopher Botta. The group's debut album, Ambit, which combined chamber writing for strings and vibraphone with experimental rock, jazz, and electronic elements, was issued in 2014 by Cuneiform. All Music Guide called the album "one of 2014's finest albums of challenging, engaging, and genre-defying contemporary music."

In 2019, Branciforte founded the greyfade record label to present work from artists exploring process-based composition, electronic and acoustic minimalism, and digitally-mediated improvisation. The label's inaugural release was LP1, a collaboration between vocalist Theo Bleckmann and Branciforte on modular synthesizer, Fender Rhodes, and electronic processing. In 2021, Branciforte won Grammy and Latin Grammy awards for his engineering on Eliane Elias's Mirror Mirror with Chick Corea in the Best Latin Jazz Album category. He also collaborated with composer Kenneth Kirschner on an album featuring algorithmically composed pieces for chamber ensemble, From The Machine: Volume 1. In 2023, Branciforte & Bleckmann released LP2, a follow-up and companion piece to LP1, which Popmatters called "a stunning experimental soundscape."

In 2024, Branciforte arranged and produced Taylor Deupree's Sti.ll, an acoustic re-imagining of an earlier album of Deupree's. In its review of Sti.ll, Pitchfork said that Branciforte's arrangements "set out to do the impossible," transcribing the original album by "painstakingly isolating different frequency ranges for each track," and producing "a contemporary classical composition of arresting beauty."

== Albums ==
- Joseph Branciforte & Jozef Dumoulin: ITERAE (greyfade, 2026)
- Joseph Branciforte & Theo Bleckmann: LP2 (greyfade, 2023)
- Joseph Branciforte & Theo Bleckmann: LP1 (greyfade, 2019)

== As performer ==
- Taylor Deupree: Sti.ll (Nettwerk, 2024)
- Ben Monder: Planetarium (Sunnyside, 2024)
- The Cellar and Point: Ambit (Cuneiform, 2014)

== As arranger ==
- Taylor Deupree: Sti.ll (Nettwerk, 2024)
- Kenneth Kirschner: Three Cellos (greyfade, 2024)
- Kenneth Kirschner & Joseph Branciforte: From The Machine, Volume 1 (greyfade, 2021)
- The Cellar and Point: Ambit (Cuneiform, 2014)

== As engineer and producer ==
- Bill Frisell: In My Dreams (Blue Note, 2026)
- Thomas Morgan: Around You Is A Forest (Loveland, 2025)
- Sam Yahel: Quiet Flow (LA Reserve, 2025)
- Ben Monder: Planetarium (Sunnyside, 2024)
- Taylor Deupree: Sti.ll (Nettwerk, 2024)
- The Westerlies: Move (2023)
- Matt McBane & Sandbox Percussion: Bathymetry (Cantaloupe, 2022)
- Christopher Otto / JACK Quartet: rag'sma (greyfade, 2021)
- Craig Taborn: Sixty x 60 (Pyroclastic, 2021)
- Eliane Elias, Chick Corea, and Chucho Valdez: Mirror, Mirror (Candid, 2021)
- Ben Monder, Tony Malaby, Tom Rainey: Live at the 55 Bar (Sunnyside, 2021)
- Tim Berne's Snakeoil: The Deceptive 4 (Intakt, 2020)
- Nir Felder: II (Ropeadope, 2020)
- Ben Monder: Day After Day (Sunnyside, 2019)
- Steve Lehman: Sélébéyone (Pi Recordings, 2016)
- The Cellar and Point: Ambit (Cuneiform, 2014)
- Ben Monder: Hydra (Sunnyside, 2013)
- Tim Berne's Snakeoil: Shadow Man (ECM, 2013)
- Son Lux: Lanterns (Joyful Noise, 2013)
- Nels Cline, Jim Black, and Tim Berne: Shadow Man (Crytogramophone, 2010)
