= The Cellar and Point =

- Origin: New York City, New York, United States
- Genres: Post-rock, contemporary classical music, jazz, progressive rock, electronica, ambient music
- Years active: 2010-present
- Label: Cuneiform Records
- Members: Joe Bergen; Christopher Botta; Joseph Branciforte; Greg Chudzik; Kevin McFarland; Terrence McManus; Christopher Otto

The Cellar and Point is an American "garage-chamber'" septet from New York City. Formed by drummer/producer/composer Joseph Branciforte and guitarist/composer Christopher Botta in 2010, the group's music draws from jazz, contemporary classical music, post-rock, electronica, and ambient music. Their debut record, Ambit, was released in 2014 on Cuneiform Records. The album was awarded 9/10 stars by AllMusic who called it "one of 2014's finest albums of challenging, engaging, and genre-defying contemporary music” and was included among Soundcheck host John Schaefer's Top 10 Albums of 2014.

== Music ==
The band has referred to its music as "garage-chamber," although it has alternatively been called "chamber-prog," "contemporary chamber jazz," and "post-everything." The group's core instrumentation consists of two guitars, bass, drums, vibraphone, violin, and cello, but is often extended to include banjo, piano, viola, glockenspiel, keyboards, and electronics. In addition to original compositions by co-leaders Branciforte and Botta, the group has performed and recorded arrangements of 20th century composers such as Anton Webern and György Ligeti. Past and present members currently perform with JACK Quartet, The Claudia Quintet, and Bing & Ruth.

== Members ==
- Joe Bergen — vibraphone
- Christopher Botta — acoustic guitar, banjo, composition
- Joseph Branciforte — drums, piano, composition
- Greg Chudzik — electric bass
- Kevin McFarland — cello
- Terrence McManus — electric guitar
- Christopher Otto — violin, viola

== Discography ==
- Ambit (2014) Cuneiform Records
