= Mother Mallard's Portable Masterpiece Co. =

Studio album by Mother Mallard's Portable Masterpiece Company
- Released: 1973
- Recorded: 1973 at R.A. Moog Co. Electronic Studio in Trumansburg, NY & at the Mother Mallard Studio in Ithaca, NY
- Genre: Electronic
- Length: 41:00
- Label: Earthquack Recordings
- Producer: David Borden

Mother Mallard's Portable Masterpiece Company chronology
| Mother Mallard's Portable Masterpiece Co. (1973) | Like a Duck to Water (1976) |

Professional ratings
Review scores
| Source | Rating |
|---|---|
| Allmusic | 4/5 stars |

Mother Mallard's Portable Masterpiece Co. is the debut album of synthesizer ensemble Mother Mallard's Portable Masterpiece Company, independently released in 1973 through Earthquack Recordings.

== Track listing ==
Side one
| No. | Title | Writer(s) | Length |
|---|---|---|---|
| 1. | "Easter" | David Borden | 19:30 |

Side two
| No. | Title | Writer(s) | Length |
|---|---|---|---|
| 1. | "Ceres Motion" | Steve Drews | 14:42 |
| 2. | "Train" | Steve Drews | 6:48 |

== Personnel ==
- David Borden – synthesizer, electric piano, production
- Steve Drews – synthesizer
- Linda Fisher – synthesizer
