= Denman Maroney =

American jazz musician

Denman Maroney (born 1949) is a jazz musician who plays what he calls "hyperpiano". Hyperpiano "involves stopping, sliding, bowing, plucking, striking and strumming the strings with copper bars, aluminum bowls, rubber blocks, plastic boxes and other household objects." This is sometimes done with one hand while the other hand is used to play the keys.

He received a grant from the National Endowment for the Arts for his work and worked on a new soundtrack to go with The Cabinet of Dr. Caligari.
