= Trinary System =

- Genres: indie rock, psychedelic rock
- Years active: 2013 - present
- Label: Feeding Tube Records
- Members: Roger Miller; Larry Dersch; Andrew Willis
- Website: www.trinarysystem.com

Trinary System are an American rock band featuring Roger Miller of Mission of Burma.

Miller had previously played piano with percussionist Larry Dersch as Binary System but with the addition of bassist Andrew Willis, Miller switched back to guitar and the band was renamed Trinary System. They began playing live shows and eventually released a 7" entitled Dave Davies followed by their first EP, Amplify the Amplifiers, in 2016. Their first LP, Lights in the Center of Your Head, was released in 2019.

== Discography ==
- Amplify the Amplifiers (EP, 2016)
- Lights in the Center of Your Head (LP, 2019)
