= Heldon =

French band

- Origin: France
- Genres: Electronic rock; experimental rock; progressive
- Years active: 1974–1978, 2001
- Labels: Cuneiform; Bureau B
- Past members: Richard Pinhas; Patrick Gauthier; François Auger; Didier Batard; Georges Grunblatt; Philibert Rossi; Jannick Top; Michel Ettori

Heldon was a French electronic rock band originally active between 1974 and 1978, and led by guitarist Richard Pinhas. Other members included synthesizer player Patrick Gauthier and drummer François Auger. The name of the band was taken from the 1972 novel The Iron Dream by Norman Spinrad.

Influenced by the work of Robert Fripp (and sometimes evoking his work with Brian Eno), the music of Heldon blended electronic and rock forms. The first releases under the name Schizo, and later Heldon, were self-produced and self-distributed. Jim Dorsch from AllMusic would later describe Heldon's seven albums as "groundbreaking."

Pinhas had previously led the band Schizo and also released six albums under his own name. Pinhas has worked with numerous collaborators, including musicians of the band Magma, and music journalist and multi-instrumentalist Hervé Picart. He was also associated with philosophers such as Gilles Deleuze (of whom he was a student). and Jean-François Lyotard, as well as writers such as Norman Spinrad and the essayist and novelist Maurice Dantec. Pinhas completed his PhD in Philosophy from the Paris-Sorbonne University in 1974, teaching for one year and beginning Heldon.

The Pinhas/Heldon catalog was reissued on CD by the label Cuneiform, and later Bureau B.

== Discography of Richard Pinhas and Heldon ==
- Schizo : And The Little Girl/Paraphrénia Praecox (1972) (7")
- Schizo : Le Voyageur/Torcol (1972) (7")
- Heldon : Électronique Guerilla (1974)
- Heldon : Allez Téia (1974)
- Heldon : Third (It's Always Rock and Roll) (1975)
- Heldon : Soutien à la RAF (7") (1975)
- Heldon : Agneta Nilsson (1976)
- Heldon : Perspective 1 bis complément/Perspective 4 bis (1976) (7")
- Heldon : Un Rêve Sans Conséquence Spéciale (1976)
- Richard Pinhas : Rhizosphère (1977)
- T.H.X. : Telstar / Rhizosphère Suite (1978) (7")
- Richard Dunn : Séquences/Modulations (1978) (7")
- Richard Pinhas : Chronolyse (1978)
- Ose : Adonia (1978)
- Heldon : Interface (1977)
- Heldon : Stand By (1979)
- Richard Pinhas : Iceland (1979)
- Richard Pinhas : East West (1980)
- Richard Pinhas : L'Ethique (1982)
- Richard Pinhas Heldon : Perspective (1983)
- Richard Pinhas : DWW (1992)
- Richard Pinhas & John Livengood : Cyborg Sally (1994)
- Richard Pinhas & John Livengood : Single (1996)
- Richard Pinhas : De l'Un et du Multiple (1997)
- Schizotrope : Le Plan (1999)
- Richard Pinhas & Peter Frohmader: Fossil Culture (1999)
- Pascal Comelade & Richard Pinhas : Oblique Sessions II (1999)
- Schizotrope : The Life And Death Of Marie Zorn - North American Tour 1999 (2000)
- Schizotrope : III Le Pli (2001)
- Heldon : Only Chaos is Real (2001)
- Richard Pinhas : Event and Repetitions (2003)
- Richard Pinhas : Tranzition (2004)
- Richard Pinhas : Metatron (2006, 2CDs)
- Richard Pinhas & Merzbow : Keio Line (2008, 2CDs)
- Richard Pinhas : Metal/Crystal (2010, 2CDs) with Merzbow & Wolf Eyes
- Råd Kjetil Senza Testa : Vinliden (2010, LP) with Richard Pinhas and RKST.
- Richard Pinhas & Merzbow : Rhizome (2011)
- Richard Pinhas & Merzbow : Paris 2008 (2011, LP)
- Richard Pinhas : Desolation Row (2013)

The majority of recordings of Richard Pinhas and Heldon were first pressed on CD by French label Spalax and American label Cuneiform Records, featuring numerous bonus tracks. Several titles have also been subsequently reissued by Bureau B.
