= Happy Family (Japanese band) =

Japanese band

- Origin: Japan
- Genres: Progressive rock, Zeuhl, avant-rock
- Years active: 1987–present
- Label: Cuneiform
- Members: Kenichi Morimoto; Takahiro Izutani; Keiichi Nagase; Hidemi Ichikawa
- Past members: Shige Makino; Tatsuya Miyano
- Website: facebook.com/HappyFamily.music

Happy Family is a Japanese instrumental progressive rock band based in Tokyo formed in 1987 by music students of Tokyo's University of Meiji. They are influenced by French progressive rock band Magma (and so are associated with Magma's style of music which is termed Zeuhl) and British experimental band Henry Cow.

They are also influenced by minimal music. Jim Dorsch, writing for AllMusic, feels that the drummer, Nagase, contributes "rhythmic complexity" to their music. They broke up at the end of 1998 for 14 years, then reformed in 2012. They are now active, releasing new album along with attending 1st edition of Rock in Opposition Japan Festival in 2014.

== History ==
around 1st album
Kenichi Morimoto (keyboards) / Tatsuya Miyano (bass) / Shige Makino (guitar) / Keiichi Nagase (drums)
around 2nd album
Kenichi Morimoto (keyboards) / Tatsuya Miyano (bass) / Takahiro Izutani (guitar) / Keiichi Nagase (drums)
around 3rd album ~ now
Kenichi Morimoto (keyboards) / Hidemi Ichikawa (bass) / Takahiro Izutani (guitar) / Keiichi Nagase (drums)

== Discography ==
- Happy Family; Cuneiform Records, 1995
- Toscco; Cuneiform Records/ Arcangelo, 1997
- Minimal Gods; Cuneiform Records / Disk Union, 2014
- Various Artists / Unsettled Scores; Cuneiform Records, 1995
- 4037 (EP); Cuneiform Records, 2025
