= Forever Einstein =

- Genres: Avant-garde
- Years active: 1989–present
- Labels: Cuneiform Records
- Members: John Roulat, Charles O'Meara, Kevin Gerety
- Past members: Marc Sichel and Jack Vees

Forever Einstein is an avant-garde band formed in 1989, and described as a, "very smart trio," The band consists of original members John Roulat (drums and percussion) and Charles O'Meara, aka C.W. Vrtacek (guitars, keyboards). The band features bassist Kevin Gerety on acoustic and electric fretless basses and Warr Guitar. Past members include original bassist Marc Sichel and Jack Vees. The band was a featured act at the annual MIMI festival of progressive music in France (1991) and Prog Day in North Carolina (2003). They are known for tightly weaving a variety of styles such as folk, surf-rock, jazz, metal, country and more into concise, highly arranged pieces with long, often ridiculous titles. They sounded like a mixture of King Crimson, Frank Zappa, and Gong.

O'Meara is also a member of the Colorado experimental music collective Biota and has released a number of solo albums. Roulat has worked in the band Bone with Nick Didkovsky (Doctor Nerve, Fred Frith Guitar Quartet) and Hugh Hopper (Soft Machine).

== Discography ==
- 1990 Artificial Horizon (Cuneiform Records Rune 25)
- 1992 Opportunity Crosses the Bridge (Cuneiform Records Rune 41, produced by Nick Didkovsky)
- 1998 One Thing After Another (Cuneiform Records Rune 106)
- 2000 Down With Gravity (Cuneiform Records Rune 136)
- 2005 Racket Science (Cuneiform Records Rune 206)
