= David Borden =

American composer

David Russell Borden (born December 25, 1938, in Boston, Massachusetts) is an American composer and keyboard player of minimalist music.

David Borden was educated at the Eastman School of Music and Harvard University. At Harvard he studied with Leon Kirchner and Randall Thompson, and at Eastman with Bernard Rogers and Howard Hanson. He was also a Fulbright student in Berlin Germany, where he studied at the Hochschule für Musik. His first composition teachers were jazz musicians Jimmy Giuffre and Jaki Byard.

He collaborates and performs with his son, Gabriel Borden and stepson, Sam Godin. Borden resides in Ithaca, NY with his wife, Rebecca Godin. He is the retired founder and Director of the Digital Music Program (now the Cornell Electroacoustic Music Center) at Cornell University.

In 1969, with the support of Robert Moog, he founded the synthesizer ensemble Mother Mallard's Portable Masterpiece Company in Ithaca New York. Mother Mallard performed pieces by Robert Ashley, John Cage, Terry Riley, Philip Glass, and Steve Reich. In addition to his work with electronics and the Mother Mallard ensemble, Borden has written music for various chamber and vocal ensembles. He is also an accomplished jazz pianist.

Borden's compositions are similar to the repetitive minimalist style of Philip Glass, Steve Reich, and Terry Riley. Borden is also very interested in counterpoint, best demonstrated in his large scale series of works The Continuing Story of Counterpoint, Parts 1-12.

David Borden was commissioned to write the score to the 1973 film The Exorcist by director William Friedkin. However, less than a minute of Borden's music was actually used in the film (Mike Oldfield's Tubular Bells was prominently featured on the soundtrack instead.)

Borden participated in the many activities surrounding the 30th anniversary of the founding of Mother Mallard's Portable Masterpiece Company in 1999, including several live performances and CD reissues on the Cuneiform record label.

His The Continuing Story of Counterpoint (a twelve-part cycle of pieces for synthesizers, acoustic instruments and voice) has been called the "Goldberg Variations of minimalism.'" John DiLiberto

Four books have cited and discussed his work. In keeping with his interdisciplinary approach to his life and work, two books deal with American music history, one with music technology and one with the paintings of George Deem:

- America's Music in the Twentieth Century by Kyle Gann (Schirmer Books, New York, 1997)
- America's Musical Life: A History by Richard Crawford (W. W, Norton & Company, New York, London, 2001)
- Analog Days: The Invention and Impact of the Moog Synthesizer by Trevor Pinch and Frank Trocco (Harvard University Press, Cambridge, Massachusetts, London, England, 2002)
- How to Paint a Vermeer by George Deem (Thames & Hudson, N.Y., 2004)

Borden's music is recorded by the Cuneiform, New World Records, Lameduck and Arbiter labels.

== Selected works ==
- 1959 Dialogues for trombone and trumpet
- 1967 All-American Teenage Lovesongs for wind ensemble and tape, commissioned by Ithaca High School
- 1970 Cloudscape for Peggy
- 1970 Easter for Mother Mallard ensemble
- 1972 (?) C-A-G-E, Part I for Mother Mallard ensemble
- 1974 C-A-G-E, Part II for Mother Mallard ensemble
- 1975 C-A-G-E, Part III for Mother Mallard ensemble
- 1976-1987 The Continuing Story of Counterpoint, Parts 1-12 for Mother Mallard ensemble
  - 1976 Part 1
  - 1976 Part 3
  - 1977 Part 5
  - 1978 Part 6
  - 1978 Part 7
  - 1979 Part 8, Part 8A, Part 8B, Part 8C
  - 1980 Part 9
  - 1982 Part 2
  - 1983 Part 4
  - 1986 Part 11
  - 1987 Part 10
  - 1987 Part 12A, Part 12B, Part 12C
- 1978 Enfield in Summer for Mother Mallard ensemble
- 1978 Enfield in Winter for Mother Mallard ensemble
- 1984 I Trill Tunes (anagram of Nurit Tilles) for one or two keyboards
- 1987 Double Portrait for two pianos
- 1989 Angels for vocal ensemble and Mother Mallard ensemble
- 1994 Notes From Vienna for solo electric guitar and wind ensemble (or synthesizers)
- 1995 Infinity Variations for two fortepianos and chamber orchestra
- 2002 Naked American (anagram of Diane Ackerman)
- 2003 K216.01a for solo electric violin and synthesizers
- 2005 A Tin Haiku (anagram of Kia-Hui Tan)
- 2006 Smart Hubris (anagram of Ritsu Brahm) for solo violin and synthesizers
- 2007 Heaven-Kept Soul (anagram of Kathleen Supové) for solo piano and synthesizers
- 2007 Tribute to Ruth St. Denis and Ted Shawn for synthesizers
- 1990-2010 Earth Journeys (variations on Happy Birthday to You)
- 2009 Viola Farber in 7 Movements for synthesizers
- 2010 Remembering Jimmy
- 2010 ESP 9461 NY
- 2011-2014 Variations on a Theme of Philip Glass 2011-2014 for synthesizers
- 2014 Quartet in Four Movements for oboe and string trio
- 2012-2016 12 Preludes and Fugues for solo piano
- 2011-2016 12 Preludes and Fugues for two pianos

== Discography (Mother Mallard and David Borden) ==
- 1973 Mother Mallard's Portable Masterpiece Co. [Earthquack]
  - 1999 Reissued as 1970-1973 with previously unissued recordings [Cuneiform]
- 1976 Like A Duck To Water [Earthquack]
  - 1999 Reissued with previously unissued recordsings [Cuneiform]
- 1981 Music For Amplified Keyboard Instruments [Red Music]
- 1983 Anatidae [Cuneiform: LP only]
- 1988 Migration [Cuneiform: LP only]
- 1988 The Continuing Story of Counterpoint Parts 9-12 [Cuneiform]
- 1990 The Continuing Story of Counterpoint Parts 5-8 [Cuneiform]
- 1990 The Continuing Story of Counterpoint Parts 1-4+8 [Cuneiform]
- 1992 Double Portrait (1987) included in collection U.S. Choice by Double Edge piano duo [CRI]
- 1993 Cayuga Night Music [Lameduck]
- 1995 Places, Times, and People [Cuneiform]
- 1997 As Time Goes By [Lameduck], piano duos and solos, with Edward Murray
- 2003 Mother Mallard's Portable Masterpiece Co., music by David Borden (previously unissued 1976-77 recordings of "Counterpoint" Parts 1 & 3 and "C-A-G-E" part 3) [Arbiter]
- 2005 Waterwheel (by Steve Drews) (excerpt: Film by Edin Velez, Music by Mother Mallard) included in collection Ohm+ [DVD, Ellipsis Arts]
- 2011 FRKWYS07 [Rvng Intl], with James Ferraro, Laurel Halo, Daniel Lopatin and Sam Godin.
- 2021 Heaven-Kept Soul [Cuneiform]
- 2021 Smart Hubris [Cuneiform]

== Film scores ==
Composer:

- Marathon (1965)
- Flatland (1965)
- Branches (1970)
- The Exorcist (1973)
- They Made Movies in Ithaca (1975)
- It's Tough To Make It In This League (1977) CBS Sports
- Louisville (1998)

== See also ==
- Mother Mallard's Portable Masterpiece Company
- Minimalist music
