= Radio Massacre International =

British band

Radio Massacre International is a trio of British musicians, Steve Dinsdale (keyboards and drums), Duncan Goddard (keyboards and bass), and Gary Houghton (guitar, synth). They specialize in improvisational experimental electronic music, utilising vintage synthesizers and sampled sounds alongside electric guitar. They are also exponents of the Mellotron keyboard. More recently, they have begun to incorporate bass guitar and drums by varying degrees in an attempt to stretch musical boundaries within the confines of a three-piece. Their music has been described alternatively as ambient music, space rock, Krautrock, New Age, Berlin School, and various other terms, although the band itself prefers the label "organic music". Points of reference include bands ranging from Tangerine Dream to "Rabbit"-era Chas and Dave.

== Name ==
The unusual name dates to the early 1980s, and the trio's early experiments with primitive sounds. The name was coined by Steve to describe cathartic sessions by the band, working away from traditional write/arrange/rehearse methods. Lacking anything but the most basic equipment, the band plugged keyboards and guitars straight into a cassette deck for a more abrasive sound than that achieved with the (mostly borrowed) equipment used in the making of their early recordings as DAS. Therefore, there is no deeper meaning in the name. It was adopted as the main name for the band in 1990, as recording in the "DAS" style was wound up. There are 12 DAS "albums", although only the first was ever published (as a cassette album); some of the later titles feature other musicians and any plan to release these recordings would mean hunting down the participants to obtain clearance.

== History ==
The band dates to the late 1970s, when Steve and Duncan went to the same school. They formed the band DAS with Gary and recorded 12 albums between 1979 and 1987, most of which were never released.

Steve, who is originally a drummer, went on to play in a couple of 'scene' bands after moving to London in 1988, while Duncan started to amass synthesizers, and recorded the first solo projects. When he finally found a space for him and Steve – who got disillusioned with the music business at that time – to work in, they recorded a first session in 1993, which was later released as Startide. Gary re-joined in 1994 with his guitar, and the band as it's known today was born.

Their first official release was the double CD Frozen North on Centaur in 1995. They also debuted Radio Massacre International as a live act at the Emma festival in Sheffield in the same year.

In 1996, they were invited to perform on MTV's Party Zone, making them probably the only band to play a live piece on the dance-orientated show that did not contain a single discernible beat. The same month, they were the first electronic artists to play at the famous Jodrell Bank observatory, in the shadow of the radio dish. This was later released as the humorously titled live CD Knutsford in May.

1997 saw them play at the famous (but now defunct) KLEMdag festival in Nijmegen, Netherlands, in front of the band's largest ever live audience. The year 2000 brought appearances at the Alfa Centauri festival in the Netherlands, and another visit to Jodrell Bank. The band's music was also featured in the BBC-TV programme "Don’t Look Down" about the 300 ft radio telescope.

The first Hampshire Jam festival of electronic music in Liphook in 2001 saw them appear together with other artists of the genre like Air Sculpture, Paul Nagle and Free System Project. In November 2002, they played their first dates in the United States, at the ProgWest Festival in LA and at The Gatherings Concert Series in Philadelphia. Furthermore, they appeared twice live on radio, on Alien Air Music on KXLU in LA, and on Star's End on WXPN in Philadelphia. True to form, the band released a 2-CD collection documenting this tour (Solid States).

Further live events included the E-Live festival in Eindhoven, the Netherlands in late 2003, and the Virtaa Arts Festival in Tapiola (nr Helsinki), Finland in early 2004. Manchester's The Night and Day Cafe witnessed a 2004 collaborative performance which saw RMI and Can luminary Damo Suzuki perform together for the first time.

A return visit to Philadelphia in 2004 at the invitation of Chuck Van Zyl resulted in a recording contract with USA label Cuneiform Records, for which the debut release was 2005's Emissaries, a double CD which also featured a full-colour comic-strip story by artist Matt Howarth.

Since 2003, they have given annual performances at the UK National Space Centre in Leicester, performing with fellow artist Ian Boddy as a guest of the band on the last of these occasions in March 2006. RMI then released the Septentrional CD on Boddy's DiN label, which was again characterised by a collaborative spirit, with Boddy treating and remixing the material.

In December 2006, they released the long-awaited 6-CD compilation Lost in Space, a career retrospective but containing entirely unreleased material from 1987 to 2003.

In September 2007, they released two CDs. The first, Rain Falls in Grey, the band describe in the sleeve notes as "a way of saying goodbye and thanks to a genuine one off", referring to Syd Barrett. The cover art for this release was drawn by Daevid Allen, famous as a member of the group Gong. The second release, Blacker, was on their own Northern Echo record label. The albums were launched with a rare UK show featuring album guest Martin Archer.

Once again they visited the East Coast of the US in November 2007, and played a mostly well-received series of radio sessions and live shows in a variety of contexts, augmented on occasions by Premik Russell Tubbs and Cyndee Lee Rule.

In February 2008, they completed recording of their first film soundtrack, entitled City 21, due for release in September 2008 by the Knossus Project.

In June 2008, they played NEARfest in Bethlehem, Pennsylvania, USA, their most high-profile appearance to date.

In October 2008, they played again at the E-Live festival in Eindhoven.

October 2009 saw their second appearance at the Hampshire Jam Festival in Liphook, Hampshire.

2019 saw the band win the prestigious Downe Arms quiz night competition donating the prize money to the village of Castelton's playground fund.

== Discography ==
The band has been prolific, largely due to the improvised and lengthy nature of their musical explorations, releasing over 45 albums.

Album	Year	Notes
Frozen North	1995	
Republic	1996	
Knutsford in May (Live)	1997	
Burned & Frozen	1997	
Diabolica	1997	Recorded in 1994
Organ Harvest	1997	
Gulf	1998	
A Bridge Too Far (Live)	1998	Recorded in 1997
Borrowed Atoms	1998	
Live at the October Gallery (Live)	1998	Ltd. edition for visitors of the concert only
Bothered Atmos	1999	Sequel to Borrowed Atoms
Upstairs Downstairs (Live)	2000	
Been There Done That (Live)	2000	Recorded in 1997 Cuneiform Records
The God of Electricity	2000	Recorded in 1994
Zabriskie Point	2000	
Planets in the Wires	2001	
Startide	2001	Recorded in 1993
Maelstrom	2002	Recorded in 1999
Greenhousing	2003	
Solid States (Live)	2003	
E-Live 2003 (Live)	2003	
People would really like Space Rock if they would only give it a try (Live)	2004	
Walking on the Sea (Live)	2004	
Hog Wild (Live)	2004	
Emissaries	2005	Cuneiform Records
Septentrional	2006	
Lost in Space 6 CD Boxed Set	2006	
Rain Falls in Grey	2007	Cuneiform Records
Blacker	2007	
October Gallery (redux)	2007	Download-only release of complete 1997 concert
Antisocial	2008	Download/CD-R release of 2005 concert
Fast Forward	2008	Sampler covering band's entire recorded output
Philadelphia Air-Shot	2008	Live set from WXPN's Star's End Radio show 14 November 2007
Rain Falls in a Different Way	2008	Companion set to Rain Falls in Grey
E-Live 2008	2009	
Liphook Variations	2009	Download-only release, CD release possible in mid-2010
March 2000	2009	Download-only release
Time & Motion	2010	Cuneiform Records
Lost in Transit 7 CD Boxed Set	2010	Limited edition release of selected live performances from 2004–2007
City21	2011	
Lost in Transit, Volume 8-10	2013	
The Clouds of Titan	2013	

=== RMI solo albums ===
- Steve Dinsdale - New Church (2009)
- Steve Dinsdale - On The Other Side (2010)
- Steve Dinsdale - The Vast Key (2012)
- Steve Dinsdale - Within Oirschot (2012)
- Duncan Goddard - Electrical Tape (2013)

=== RMI on various artists compilations ===
- Adrenal - Hollow Words (1996) Radio Music Intermission
- Synth Music Direct - Compilation Disc 1 (promo) (1997) Prototypes and Patents
- Is there anybody out there? (1998) RMI-Pyramid
- Concerts at Jodrell Bank (2000) 1CD of RMI Live at Jodrell Bank/Alfa Centauri Festival
- Hampshire Jam Preserved (2001) Pipe / Everybody Say Yeah / Roxette lost in Liphook
- E-dition CD sampler #4 (2004) Nucleotide Diversities (excerpt)
- E-dition CD sampler #8 (2005) The Emissaries Suite
- Awakenings 2005 (2005) Sherwood's Special
- Star's End 30th Anniversary Anthology (2007) Philadelphia Rain
- Resonance: The Echoes Living Room Concerts vol. 13 (2007) Gibraltar

== Sources ==
- History and Tour Diary on the official website
