= Fossil Culture =

Studio album by Peter Frohmader/Richard Pinhas
- Released: September 22, 1999
- Recorded: 1996 – 1998
- Studio: Nekropolis (Munich)
- Genre: Electronic
- Length: 71:47
- Label: Cuneiform
- Producer: Peter Frohmader, Richard Pinhas

Peter Frohmader chronology
The Awakening (1997)	Fossil Culture (1999)	Space Icon (2000)

Professional ratings
Review scores
Source	Rating
Allmusic	3/5 stars
Alternative Press	4/5 stars

Fossil Culture is an album by Peter Frohmader and Richard Pinhas, released on September 22, 1999, through Cuneiform Records.

== Track listing ==
All music is composed by Peter Frohmader and Richard Pinhas

No.	Title	Length
1.	"Fossil Culture 1"	11:53
2.	"Fossil Culture 2"	5:49
3.	"Fossil Culture 3"	10:29
4.	"Fossil Culture 4"	8:06
5.	"Fossil Culture 5"	8:51
6.	"Fossil Culture 6"	9:43
7.	"Fossil Culture 7"	16:56

== Personnel ==
Adapted from the Fossil Culture liner notes.

Musicians

- Peter Frohmader – five-string bass guitar, E-mu Emulator, synthesizer, sampler, illustrations, production, mixing
- Richard Pinhas – guitar, effects, production

Production and additional personnel

- Bill Ellsworth – design, illustrations
- Bernd Koller – mixing

== Release history ==
Region	Date	Label	Format	Catalog
United States	1999	Cuneiform	CD	Rune 123
