= Mother Mallard's Portable Masterpiece Company =

Mother Mallard's Portable Masterpiece Company, formed in 1969 by David Borden, was an early synthesizer ensemble, predating groups like Tonto's Expanding Head Band and Tangerine Dream. Borden was in contact with Robert Moog and was one of the first musicians to use his Minimoog. After recruiting Steve Drews and Linda Fisher to operate additional synthesizers, the group began playing concerts of minimalist music by Terry Riley, Steve Reich, and Philip Glass. They began recording their first, self-titled album in 1970, but it would not be released until 1973 by Earthquack Records. Their second album, Like a Duck to Water, was released in 1976. Borden and Mother Mallard continue performing Borden's recent and older music.

David Borden and Mother Mallard continued performing and releasing albums in the following years, most notably on the Cuneiform record label. Borden adopted new digital synthesizer technology over time, and also incorporated various acoustic woodwind instruments and voices. Borden's most ambitious work, The Continuing Story of Counterpoint Parts 1-12, composed between 1976 and 1987, was recorded and released on three Cuneiform CDs between 1988 and 1991. The label also reissued Mother Mallard's first two 1970s recordings on CD.

== Lineup ==
- David Borden
- Blaise Bryski
- David Yearsley
- Josh Oxford
- Conrad Alexander
- Gabriel Borden
- Lynn Pursen

== Former members ==
- Steve Drews
- Judy Borsher
- Linda Fisher
- Les Thimming

== Discography (Mother Mallard and David Borden) ==
- 1973 Mother Mallard's Portable Masterpiece Co. [Earthquack]
  - 1998 Reissued as 1970-1973 with previously unissued recordings [Cuneiform]
- 1976 Like A Duck To Water [Earthquack]
  - 1999 Reissued with previously unissued recordsings [Cuneiform]
- 1981 Music For Amplified Keyboard Instruments [Red]
- 1983 Anatidae [Cuneiform: LP only]
- 1988 Migration [Cuneiform: LP only]
- 1988 The Continuing Story of Counterpoint Parts 9-12 [Cuneiform]
- 1990 The Continuing Story of Counterpoint Parts 5-8 [Cuneiform]
- 1990 The Continuing Story of Counterpoint Parts 1-4+8 [Cuneiform]
- 1992 "Double Portrait" (1987) included in collection U.S. Choice by Double Edge piano duo [CRI]
- 1995 Cayuga Night Music [Cuneiform]
- 1995 Places, Times, and People [Cuneiform]
- 2003 Mother Mallard's Portable Masterpiece Co., music by David Borden (previously unissued 1976-77 recordings of "Counterpoint" Parts 1 & 3 and "C-A-G-E" part 3) [Arbiter]
- 2005 Waterwheel (by Steve Drews) (excerpt: Film by Edin Velez, Music by Mother Mallard) included in collection Ohm+ [DVD, Ellipsis Arts]

== Selected music (Mother Mallard and David Borden) ==
- 1959 Dialogues for trombone and trumpet
- 1967 All-American, Teenage, Lovesongs for wind ensemble and tape, commissioned by Ithaca High School
- 1970 Cloudscape for Peggy]
- 1970 Easter for Mother Mallard ensemble]
- 1972 C-A-G-E, Part I for Mother Mallard ensemble
- 1974 C-A-G-E, Part II for Mother Mallard ensemble
- 1975 C-A-G-E, Part II for Mother Mallard ensembleI
- 1976-1987 The Continuing Story of Counterpoint, Parts 1-12 for Mother Mallard ensemble
- 1978 Enfield in Summer]
- 1987 Double Portrait for two pianos
- 1989 Angels for vocal ensemble and Mother Mallard ensemble
- 1991 Unjust Malaise (anagram of Julius Eastman
- 1994 Notes From Vienna for solo electric guitar and wind ensemble (or synthesizers)
- 1995 Cayuga Night Music
- 1995 Infinity Variations for two fortepianos and chamber orchestra
- 2002 Naked American (anagram of Diane Ackerman)
- 2003 K216.01a for solo electric violin and synthesizer
- 2005 A Tin Haiku (anagram of Kia-Hui Tan)
- 2007 Heaven-Kept Soul (anagram of Kathleen Supové)
- 1990-2010 Earth Journeys by David Borden
- 2007 Tribute to Ruth St. Denis and Ted Shawn
- 2009 Viola Farber in Seven Movements
- 2010 Remembering Jimmy
- 2010 ESP 9461 NY
- 2011 FRKWYS07 [Rvng Intl], with James Ferraro, Laurel Halo, Daniel Lopatin and Sam Godin
