= Keio Line (album) =

Studio album by Richard Pinhas and Merzbow
- Released: September 30, 2008
- Recorded: October 25–27, 2007
- Studio: Peace Music Studios, Tokyo, Japan
- Genre: Ambient, noise
- Length: 109:07
- Label: Cuneiform
- Producer: Masami Akita, Richard Pinhas

Richard Pinhas and Merzbow chronology
Keio Line (2008)	Rhizome (2011)

Richard Pinhas chronology
Metatron (2006)	Keio Line (2008)	Metal/Crystal (2010)

Merzbow chronology
Anicca (2008)	Keio Line (2008)	Protean World (2008)

LP cover
- Dirter Promotions version

Keio Line is a collaborative studio album by the French electronic rock guitarist Richard Pinhas and the Japanese noise musician Merzbow. The album was released in September 2008, on double CD by Cuneiform Records in the US and on triple LP by Dirter Promotions in the UK. It is the first of several collaborations between Pinhas and Merzbow.

== Background and recording ==
Richard Pinhas and Masami Akita (Merzbow) first met when Merzbow opened for Pinhas' 2006 show in Tokyo. Pinhas recalled that he was "astonished" when he saw Merzbow play, and that he felt an immediate connection with Merzbow. When Pinhas returned to Tokyo in 2007, he suggested a collaboration to Akita. As Akita had been a longtime a fan of Pinhas and his band Heldon, he readily agreed. For the recording Akita used the vintage analog EMS Synthi A synthesizer, which he says has a "very spacey and somewhat mellower sound". He described the sessions as improvised and played "very spontaneously". Pinhas says that they didn't plan anything beforehand.

The album is named for the Keiō Line railway that took them to the recording studio, during which time they talked. Akita notes that Pinhas was involved in the 60s protest movement and worked with the philosopher Gilles Deleuze. They also discussed animal rights. They chose track titles relating to these concepts.

The album was recorded during October 25–27, 2007 at Peace Music Studios in Tokyo, Japan. Pinhas then mixed and remixed the material at Studio Ramses in Paris, France, in December 2007.

== Reception ==
Professional ratings
Review scores
Source	Rating
All About Jazz	4.5/5 stars
AllMusic	4/5 stars
Dusted	Favorable
Musicworks	Favorable
Musique Machine	5/5 stars
PopMatters	5/10 stars
Washington City Paper	Favorable

Keio Line was released to largely favorable reviews. Critics have noted that the album is less noisy than one might expect from Merzbow. Brandon Wu writing in the Washington City Paper writes that Merzbow's "grating noisescapes are, if not subdued, then at least submerged, like an insistent undertow lurking beneath the relative calm of Pinhas’ looping guitar." and that "There are no punishing gales of pure noise a la 1994’s Venereology ... Instead, Akita’s electronics emphasize subtle rumblings, vaguely rhythmic churnings that serve to provide texture and counterpoint to Pinhas’ extended ruminations." John Kelma, in All About Jazz, notes the album's "element of interaction ... with Merzbow and Pinhas responding to each other, often with great subtlety, even greater unpredictability and consistently empathic results." Both Kelman and Wu reference Robert Fripp and Brian Eno's album (No Pussyfooting).

However, Mike Newmark writing for PopMatters was critical of the album's length, and felt that the music's ambient nature made it seem even longer. Newmark also felt that the sound of Pinhas' guitar and Merzbow's noise was dated and no longer innovative.

== Track listing ==
All music is composed by Masami Akita and Richard Pinhas

CD 1
No.	Title	Length
1.	"Tokyo Electric Guerrilla"	18:30
2.	"Ikebukuro: Tout le monde descend!"	17:37
3.	"Shibuya AKS"	26:28
Total length:		62:35

CD 2
No.	Title	Length
1.	"Merzdon/Heldow Kills Animal Killers"	8:17
2.	"Chaos Line"	21:46
3.	"Fuck the Power (and Fuck Global Players)"	16:30
Total length:		46:33

== Personnel ==
Credits adapted from the album's liner notes.

Musicians

- Masami Akita – EMS Synthi A, noises
- Richard Pinhas – guitar, loop system

Technical personnel

- Souichirou Nakamura – recording engineer
- Laurent Peyron – mixing engineer, remixing assistant
- Richard Pinhas – mixing assistant
- Duncan Pinhas – remixing
- Brad Blackwood – mastering at Euphonic Masters

Design personnel

- Florence Lucas – cover art
- Car Radio (Kuro Pipe) – photos of Richard Pinhas and Merzbow at Mixrooffice [CD version]
- Duncan Pinhas – photo of Richard Pinhas with guitar [CD version]
- Bill Ellsworth – design [CD version]
- Florence Lucas – label photos [vinyl version]
- Steve Pittis – sleeve design, layout [vinyl version]

== Release history ==
Region	Date	Label	Format	Quantity	Catalog
United States	September 30, 2008	Cuneiform	2×CD	Unknown	Rune 278/279
United Kingdom	September 21, 2008	Dirter Promotions	3×LP	10000	DPROMTLP67
