= John Hanrahan =

American politician

John Hanrahan was an American farmer and politician.

Born in Massachusetts, Hanrahan was a farmer and lived in the town of Granville, Wisconsin, in the community of Good Hope, Wisconsin. He served in the Wisconsin State Assembly in 1861 and 1863 as a Democrat.
