= Cosmologic =

American avant-garde jazz band

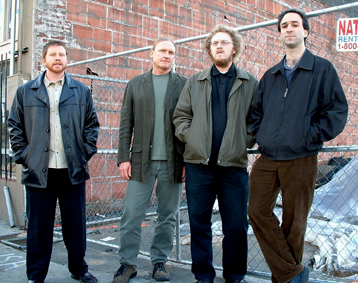
- Cosmologic, 2007

Background information
- Origin: California, US
- Genres: Improvised music, avant-garde jazz
- Years active: 1999–2011
- Labels: Circumvention, Cuneiform
- Members: Jason Robinson (sax), Michael Dessen (trombone), Nathan Hubbard (percussion), Scott Walton (bass)
- Website: www.cosmologic.org

Cosmologic was a cooperative avant-jazz quartet from California that was composed of saxophonist Jason Robinson, trombonist Michael Dessen, percussionist Nathan Hubbard, and bassist Scott Walton.

The band was formed in 1999. Dessen wrote most of the tracks for their second album, Syntaxis. Their album III was described by Scott Yanow as containing "sound explorations, meandering ballad sections, and intense group improvising based on original themes".

The All About Jazz reviewer of Eyes in the Back of My Head, released by Cuneiform Records in 2008, wrote: "Cosmologic does not let the written note be the guiding light. Their sense of juxtaposition dictates the course. Flow and chaos are consonants in constant flight that are navigated by surprise". The AllMusic reviewer wrote of the band's "sound that ranges from free bop to relaxed associative and written music tailored to blur bar lines and conventional phrasings". The Washington Post reviewer wrote: "For all the improvised and willfully discordant music this 10-year old West Coast quartet is capable of producing, and reveling in, Cosmologic produces a sound so rich in mood-shifting maneuvers and sophisticated interplay that it defies labeling." The band stopped playing in 2011.

== Discography ==
- Staring at the Sun (Circumvention, 2000)
- Syntaxis (Circumvention, 2002)
- III (Circumvention, 2005)
- Eyes in the Back of My Head (Cuneiform, 2008)
