= UtoteM =

Former chain of convenience stores

- Industry: Convenience store
- Defunct: 1984; 42 years ago
- Key people: LeRoy Melcher

UtoteM, also spelled U-tote-M or U Totem, was a chain of convenience stores which operated until 1984, primarily in the southwestern United States and Florida.

The chain experienced most of its growth under the leadership of LeRoy Melcher (1912-1999), who acquired the chain in 1950 and became its president in 1953. Melcher expanded UtoteM from ten stores to more than one thousand across thirteen states. UtoteM merged with Fairmont Foods in the late 1960s. In 1983, the Circle K Corporation bought all of the stock of Utotem Inc. for 225 million dollars from American Financial Corporation, and in 1984 rebranded the stores as Circle K stores.

Herb Ralston was an early partner. Ralston made history when he designed, built and opened the first convenience store in the United States that also offered gas. The store was located in Webster, Texas on NASA Road 1.
