= Forgas Band Phenomena =

French progressive rock and jazz fusion band

Forgas Band Phenomena is a French instrumental progressive rock and jazz fusion band.

Inspired by Soft Machine and the Canterbury scene, composer and drummer Patrick Forgas has created the band and is still leading it.

Since 2005, his albums are edited by the American label Cuneiform.

JazzTimes noted about the band's 2005 album, Soleil 12, "While there are periods in 'Coup De Theatre' and 'Pieuvre a la Pluie' when the Forgas Band takes far too long to conclude segments that have peaked creatively, the bulk of Soleil 12 is captivating."

== Current line-up ==
- Patrick Forgas, drums
- Sébastien Trognon, tenor, alto and soprano sax, flute
- Dimitri Alexaline, trumpet, flugelhorn
- Benjamin Violet, guitar (up to March 2013)
- Karolina Mlodecka, violin
- Igor Brover, keyboards
- Kengo Mochizuki, bass guitar

From April 2013, Pierre Schmidt replaces Benjamin Violet, who has joined Tryo as a multi-instrumentist.

== Discography ==
=== Forgas ===
- Cocktail (1977) (2008 reissue by Musea w/ 13 prev. unissued numbers from 1973 to 1979)
- L’œil (1990)
- Art d’Écho (1993)
- Synchronicité (solo) (2002)

=== Forgas Band Phenomena ===
- Roue libre (1997)
- Extra-Lucide (1999)
- Soleil 12 (Live) (2005)
- L’Axe du Fou – Axis of Madness (2009)
- Acte V (2012) (+ DVD from their NEARfest gig on June 19, 2010)
- L'Oreille Electrique [The Electric Ear] (2018)

=== Forgas singles ===
- Monks (La danse des moines) / Cocktail (1977)
- Miroir tu triches / À fond la caisse (1982)
- C'est comme ça la vie / ...Sex move ! (1986)

=== Guest appearances ===
- Africa Anteria on 2 cd Hur ! Hommage à la musique de Christian Vander (2009)

== Filmography ==
- 2015: Romantic Warriors III: Canterbury Tales (DVD)

== Musicians ==
1997 - Roue Libre.

1. Déclic - 6:14
2. Sérum De Vérité - 18:30
3. Roue Libre - 20:10

All by P.Forgas.

- Mathias Desmier: guitar.
- Philippe Talet: bass.
- Patrick Forgas: drums, electronics.
- Mireille Bauer: vibraphone, marimba.
- Stéphane Jaoui: keyboards, rhodes.
- Frédéric Schmidely: tenor & soprano saxes; flute.

1999 - Extra-Lucide.

1. Extra-Lucide - 7:05
2. Rebirth - 5:24
3. Pieuvre À La Pluie - 18:24
4. Annie Réglisse - 8:35
5. Villa Carmen - 4:58

All by P.Forgas.

- Mathias Desmier: guitar.
- Juan-Sebastien Jimenez: bass.
- Patrick Forgas: drums.
- Gilles Pausanias: keyboards.
- Denis Guivarc'h: alto sax.

2005 - Soleil 12.

1. Soleil 12 - 9:22
2. Coup De Théâtre - 34:47
3. Éclipse - 8:16
4. Pieuvre À La Pluie - 18:18

All by P.Forgas.

- Sylvain Ducloux: guitar.
- Kengo Mochizuki: bass.
- Patrick Forgas: drums.
- Igor Brover: keyboards.
- Denis Guivarc'h: alto sax.
- Stanislas De Nussac: tenor & soprano saxes.
- Sylvain Gontard: trumpet, flugelhorn.
- Frédéric Norel: violin.

2009 - L'Axe Du Fou · Axis Of Madness.

1. La Clef (The Key) - 10:50
2. L'Axe Du Fou (Axis Of Madness) - 16:32
3. Double-Sens (Double Entendre) - 13:50
4. La 13eme Lune (The 13th Moon) - 8:24

All by P.Forgas.

- Benjamin Violet: guitar.
- Kengo Mochizuki: bass.
- Patrick Forgas: drums.
- Igor Brover: keyboards.
- Sébastien Trognon: tenor & soprano saxes; flute.
- Dimitri Alexaline: trumpet, flugelhorn.
- Karolina Mlodecka: violin.

2012 - Acte V.

Acte V (CD)

1. Corps Et Âmes 6:26
2. Loin D'Issy 7:14
3. George V 10:27
4. Ultraviolet 8:18
5. Feu Sacré 6:50
6. Midi-Minuit 13:30

NEARFest 2010 (DVD)

1. Ultraviolet 8:34
2. L'Axe Du Fou 16:06
3. Feu Sacré 6:53
4. Soleil 12 9:09
5. Double Sens 13:38
6. Extralucide 10:20
7. Éclipse 7:45

All by P.Forgas.

- Benjamin Violet: guitar.
- Kengo Mochizuki: bass.
- Patrick Forgas: drums.
- Igor Brover: keyboards.
- Sébastien Trognon: alto & soprano saxes; flute.
- Dimitri Alexaline: trumpet, flugelhorn.
- Karolina Mlodecka: violin.

2018 - L’Oreille Électrique = The Electric Ear.

1. Délice Karmâ = Karmic Delights - 9:59
2. Septième Ciel = Seventh Heaven - 10:02
3. L’Oreille Électrique = The Electric Ear - 12:00
4. Crème Anglaise = Custard Sauce - 9:37
5. Pierre Angulaire = Corner Stone - 12:34

All by P.Forgas.

- Pierre Schmidt: guitar.
- Gérard Prévost: bass.
- Patrick Forgas: drums.
- Igor Brover: keyboards, rhodes.
- Sébastien Trognon: tenor, alto & soprano saxes; flute.
- Dimitri Alexaline: trumpet, flugelhorn.
- Karolina Mlodecka: violin.
