= Even in the Midst =

Even in the Midst...

Studio album by Ahleuchatistas
- Released: 2007
- Genre: Math rock; progressive rock
- Length: 50:10
- Label: Cuneiform

Ahleuchatistas chronology
What You Will (2005)	Even in the Midst... (2007)	Of the Body Prone (2009)

Professional ratings
Review scores
Source	Rating
AllMusic	4/5 stars

Even in the Midst... is the fourth album from the American instrumental math rock band Ahleuchatistas. Released in 2007, it is their last album to feature drummer Sean Dail.

== Track listing ==
All tracks are written by Ahleuchatistas.

No.	Title	Length
1.	"...Of All This"	4:28
2.	"Post-Colonial Nausea"	3:23
3.	"Red-Coated Emergency Exit"	3:54
4.	"Cup of Substance"	0:56
5.	"The Bears of Cantabria Shall Sleep No More"	2:36
6.	"Prosthetic God"	6:34
7.	"Elegant Proof"	3:16
8.	"K-Bit"	2:47
9.	"Brillant Danderkovs"	4:26
10.	"Take Me to Your Leader Never Sounded So Alien"	5:59
11.	"Swimming Underwater with a Cat on Your Back"	5:24
12.	"Where We Left Off"	6:27
Total length:		50:10

== Personnel ==
- Derek Poteat – bass
- Shane Perlowin – guitar
- Sean Dail – drums
