= Ahleuchatistas =

American instrumental math rock band

- Origin: Asheville, North Carolina, U.S.
- Genres: Math rock; avant-garde; progressive rock; jazz; noise
- Years active: 2003–present
- Labels: Angura Sound; Cuneiform Records; Tzadik Records; Open Letter Records
- Members: Shane Parish (guitar); Danny Piechocki (drums); Trevor Dunn (bass)
- Past members: Sean Dail (drums); Derek Poteat (bass); Ryan Oslance (drums)
- Website: www.ahleuchatistas.com

Ahleuchatistas are an American instrumental math rock trio that mix influences of jazz, progressive rock, avant-garde, and experimental to create a unique sound. The band was formed in Asheville, North Carolina in November 2002.

== Band name ==
The band's name, pronounced "AH-LOO-CHA-TEES-TAS", is a portmanteau of "Ah-Leu-Cha", the Charlie Parker song, and "Zapatistas", the Mexican revolutionary movement: "Musical revolution and social revolution combined into a single coinage."

== History ==
Ahleuchatistas' sound is rooted in a wide variety of sonic influences and musical traditions. In addition to being an instrumental rock band, there are elements of noise, African music, ambient/drone, psychedelia, Chinese traditional music, garage rock, minimalism, classical music, and electronica. They employ block-form, thru-composition, and improvisational musical strategies. Sudden tempo changes, amelodic tones, and technically complex motifs are characteristic of much of the band's recorded output. The original members of the band were Shane Perlowin on guitar, Derek Poteat on bass, and Sean Dail on drums. Sean Dail left the band in May 2008 and was replaced by Ryan Oslance, a drummer from Carbondale, Illinois. Ryan was found by a reply to a MySpace bulletin outlining the band's request for a new drummer. He then drove to Asheville, auditioned, and the band immediately rehearsed for 25+ hours over a four-day period. This was followed by a 3-week US tour. Ahleuchatistas have released six albums on different record labels, including Cuneiform Records, Angura Sound, Tzadik Records, and guitarist Shane Perlowin's independent label Open Letter Records. Their album The Same and the Other was reissued in 2008 on Tzadik Records after the influential avant-garde composer/musician John Zorn took a liking to them.

== Discography ==
- On the Culture Industry (Angura Sound, 2003)
- The Same and the Other (2004) (Reissued in 2008 on Tzadik Records)
- Ahleuchatistas/Friendly Bear SPLIT 7" (Angura Sound, 2005)
- What You Will (Cuneiform Records, 2006)
- Even in the Midst (Cuneiform Records, 2007)
- Of the Body Prone (Tzadik, 2009)
- Ahleuchatistas/FAT32 SPLIT 10" (Gaffer, 2010)
- Location Location (Open Letter, 2011)
- Heads Full of Poison (Cuneiform Records, 2012)
- Arrebato (International Anthem, 2015)
- Mister Rogers' Waters digital single (2019)
- Expansion (Riverworm Records, 2023)
