= Claudia Quintet =

American jazz ensemble formed in 1997

- Origin: New York City, New York, United States
- Years active: 1997–present
- Members: John Hollenbeck; Drew Gress; Matt Moran; Ted Reichman; Chris Speed

The Claudia Quintet are an American jazz ensemble formed in 1997 by drummer and composer John Hollenbeck. The ensemble's precursor was an ensemble featuring "the Refuseniks" featuring Hollenbeck and future Quintet member Ted Reichman. The quintet gets its eponymous name from a woman named Claudia who had briefly interacted with the Refuseniks; "Claudia" became an Refuseniks inside joke after she praised a performance and promised to return, but never did.

== Personnel ==
As of 2010, the lineup is:

- Drew Gress – double bass
- John Hollenbeck – drums, percussion, composition
- Matt Moran – vibraphone
- Ted Reichman – accordion
- Chris Speed – clarinet, tenor saxophone

The Claudia Quintet have not featured anyone named "Claudia" in the ensemble, nor any women at all.

== History ==
=== Formation and naming ===
In the mid 1990s, John Hollenbeck, Ted Reichman, and bassist Reuben Redding had a weekly gig at an internet café known as "alt.coffee" in East Village of New York City, playing as the "Refuseniks". One night, a woman named Claudia approached the three, expressing significant enthusiasm for the band's work and promising to tell her friends about the Refuseniks and return for future performances. After she left, Redding whispered to Hollenbeck, "She's never coming back".

Redding was proven correct — the three never saw Claudia again. The incident, and Claudia herself, became a running joke between the bandmates; the three quipped continually about how they "saw Claudia on the street" or received a message that she was definitely coming to see the band that week. Reuben Redding later left the trio to go to college.

Hollenbeck soon enlisted three new people in 1997 to form a quintet to play at alt.coffee, inviting saxophonist and clarinetist Chris Speed, bassist Drew Gress, and then-unknown vibraphonist Matt Moran. The group was named the "Claudia Quintet", after the woman who approached them. Hollenbeck explained that the decision served as a tribute to Reuben, a "feminine quality" to define the group, and a decentralization of himself as the quintet's leader.

=== Early work ===
The Claudia Quintet continued playing at alt.coffee after formation, where they were reviewed by Ben Ratliff of The New York Times. Ratliff complimented Hollenbeck's ability to write for a quintet, and noted how Moran and Speed's parts as vibraphonist and clarinetist, which he says are related instruments, sometimes diverged from their unison. Ratliff noted how Gress, a bassist, sometimes keeps time instead of Hollenbeck, the quintet's drummer. However, he also refers to the performance as a "drummer's project", pointing out the constant and strong rhythm.

Ratliff again critiqued the Claudia Quintet in a 2003 performance at the Jazz Standard. He theorized that the high-brow style of the music, complete with clashing tones and Hollenbeck's "heap of little percussion toys", gave the group a charm that simultaneously prevented it from reaching more people. Ratliff also quipped that "if the music were a little bit dumber, it would resemble the music of the rock band Tortoise. No disrespect to Tortoise".

== Discography ==
- John Hollenbeck/The Claudia Quintet (CRI, 2001)
- I, Claudia (Cuneiform, 2004)
- Semi-Formal (Cuneiform, 2005)
- For (Cuneiform, 2007)
- Royal Toast (Cuneiform, 2010)
- What Is the Beautiful? (Cuneiform, 2011)
- September (Cuneiform, 2013)
- Super Petite (Cuneiform, 2016)
- Evidence-Based (Flexatonic, 2021)
