= Stick Men (punk band) =

American rock band

- Origin: Philadelphia, Pennsylvania, U.S.
- Genres: No wave, funk, punk rock
- Years active: 1980–1983
- Labels: Red Records; Cuneiform Records
- Past members: Peter L. Baker; B.A.L. Stack; Chuck Mattern Jr. Bill Bradfield; Jim Meneses

The Stick Men were a punk rock/no wave band from Philadelphia. Fronted by guitarist/painter/sculptor Peter L. Baker and keyboardist B.A.L. Stack, the earliest Stick Men lineup formed in 1977 and went through various member changes before settling on the group that would tour and record together in the early 1980s, featuring Chuck Mattern Jr. on vocals, saxophone, trumpet and electronics, Bill Bradfield on bass guitar, and Jim Meneses on drums/percussion. In 1982 the band released their debut LP This is the Master Brew, followed by the EP Get on Board the Stick Men in 1983.

== History ==
After graduating from the Columbus College of Art and Design, Peter L. Baker returned to Philadelphia in 1977. In addition to working in the fields of avant-garde visual and performance art, Baker formed a musical group, The Undertakers of Love, with Charles Cohen on synthesizer, Jeff Cain on keyboards, Art Noel on bass, and poet J.W. McCullough joining Baker on guitars. The group performed in local bar before Baker met Beth Anne Lejman—credited as "B.A.L. Stack”—in 1978. Baker and Stack played as the hollow-body guitar duo Blu Beth and the Gentleman Caller in Philadelphia's art gallery scene. Baker's two groups eventually merged with his performance art to form the Stick Men, shedding some members and by 1980 had enlisted George Shirley on bass, Michael McGettigan on drums, and Charles Mattern Jr. on trumpet and sax, with all members playing additional percussion. This new group entered Philly's punk rock scene and played gigs with The Contortions and Johnny Thunders, among others. For a brief period, local bassist Lance Walker, who'd worked with Patti LaBelle and Buff, played in the Stick Men, bringing his funk background into the band. The lineup of Baker, Stack, McGettigan, and Walker recorded a demo and worked New York City`s punk scene.

In 1981 Shirley was replaced by funk bassist Billy Bradfield, and McGettigan was swapped for percussionist Jim Meneses. The band established a set of songs that mixed danceable funk and disco with less predictable art rock time changes and frenetic punk similar to the no wave funk of James Chance and the Contortions or the funk-punk of The Minutemen. The Stick Men gained wider notoriety with the release of their debut 1982 album and played gigs with Gang of Four, The Slits, Lords of the New Church, Oingo Boingo, The Psychedelic Furs, Bush Tetras, The Pop Group, Nina Hagen, Pig Bag, Pete Shelley, and Wall of Voodoo. After extensive touring in the northeast U.S., one tour to the Midwest, and the release of their second record, the Stick Men disbanded.

== Aftermath ==
Peter L. Baker died in 1994 and a retrospective of the Stick Men's recordings was released in 2001 on Cuneiform Records. The CD, titled Insatiable, contains most of the Stick Men’s studio recordings, as well as songs from live radio broadcasts and a 20-minute live video of the band. The reissue excluded a few songs that had featured drummer "Disco" Fred Abrams instead of Meneses.

Percussionist Jim Meneses and bassist Bill Bradfield are the only Stick Men members reputed to be musically active. Meneses currently tours the world playing free improvisation. Bradfield now resides in San Luis Obispo, California where he participates in regular jam sessions with local Cal Poly students and aesthetes.

== Discography ==
- This is the Master Brew LP (1982, Phantom Plaything Distributed by Red Records)
- Get on Board the Stick Men 12" EP (1983, Red Records)
- Insatiable CD retrospective (2001, Cuneiform Records)
