= Sonic Geology =

Compilation album by Birdsongs of the Mesozoic
- Released: 1988
- Recorded: August 1981 – June 1985
- Genre: Instrumental rock, prog rock, underground rock
- Length: 70:53
- Label: Rykodisc
- Producer: Richard W. Harte

Birdsongs of the Mesozoic chronology
Beat of the Mesozoic (1985)	Sonic Geology (1988)	Faultline (1989)

Professional ratings
Review scores
Source	Rating
Allmusic	4.5/5 stars

Sonic Geology is a compilation album by Birdsongs of the Mesozoic, released on 1988 by Rykodisc. It collects tracks from the band's first three releases on Ace of Hearts Records as well as two previously unreleased pieces.

== Track listing ==
No.	Title	Writer(s)	Original album	Length
1.	"Shiny Golden Snakes"	Roger Miller	Magnetic Flip	3:03
2.	"Ptoccata"	Erik Lindgren	Magnetic Flip	3:17
3.	"Waterwheel"	Roger Miller	Beat of the Mesozoic	3:54
4.	"Pulse Piece"	Roger Miller		3:14
5.	"(excerpts from) The Rite of Spring"	Igor Stravinsky	Magnetic Flip	6:47
6.	"The Orange Ocean"	Roger Miller	Birdsongs of the Mesozoic	2:25
7.	"The Tyger"	Martin Swope	Magnetic Flip	3:19
8.	"Scenes from a..."	Erik Lindgren	Beat of the Mesozoic	5:02
9.	"The Beat of the Mesozoic, part I"	Roger Miller	Beat of the Mesozoic	5:32
10.	"International Tours"	Erik Lindgren	Magnetic Flip	2:51
11.	"Drift"	Roger Miller, Martin Swope	Birdsongs of the Mesozoic	2:37
12.	"Final Motif"	Rick Scott	Magnetic Flip	4:00
13.	"Theme from Rocky and Bullwinkle"	Frank Comstock, Fred Steiner	Magnetic Flip	1:29
14.	"The Fundamental"	Roger Miller	Magnetic Flip	2:48
15.	"Sound Valentine"	Roger Miller	Birdsongs of the Mesozoic	3:17
16.	"The Common Sparrow"	Martin Swope		4:54
17.	"Lost in the B-Zone"	Erik Lindgren	Beat of the Mesozoic	4:29
18.	"Triassic, Jurassic, Cretaceous"	Roger Miller	Birdsongs of the Mesozoic	7:55

== Release history ==
Region	Date	Label	Format	Catalog
United States	1988	Rykodisc	CD	RCD 20073
