= Dawn of the Cycads =

Studio album by Birdsongs of the Mesozoic
- Released: September 30, 2008
- Recorded: August 1981 – May 14, 1987
- Studio: Various: Downtown Recorders; (Boston, MA); Le Studio; (Montreal, CA); The Nightstage; (Cambridge, MA)
- Genre: Prog rock
- Length: 122:44
- Label: Cuneiform
- Producer: Richard W. Harte

Birdsongs of the Mesozoic chronology
Extreme Spirituals (2006)	Dawn of the Cycads (2008)

Professional ratings
Review scores
Source	Rating
Allmusic	4/5 stars

Dawn of the Cycads is a compilation album by Birdsongs of the Mesozoic, released on September 30, 2008 by Cuneiform Records. It comprises much of the band's 1980s output, including Birdsongs of the Mesozoic, Magnetic Flip and Beat of the Mesozoic in addition to three bonus tracks recorded during the same era and a live performance recording from 1987 retroactively titled Between the Fires.

== Track listing ==
Disc one
No.	Title	Writer(s)	Length
1.	"Sound Valentine"	Roger Miller	3:15
2.	"Transformation of Oz"	Roger Miller	2:20
3.	"Drift"	Roger Miller	2:39
4.	"The Orange Ocean"	Roger Miller	2:28
5.	"Triassic, Jurassic, Cretaceous"	Roger Miller, Martin Swope	6:15
6.	"Shiny Golden Snakes"	Roger Miller	3:00
7.	"Ptoccata"	Erik Lindgren	3:15
8.	"(excerpts from) The Rite of Spring"	Igor Stravinsky	6:42
9.	"International Tours"	Erik Lindgren	2:50
10.	"Terry Riley's House"	Roger Miller	3:57
11.	"Theme from Rocky and Bullwinkle"	Frank Comstock/Fred Steiner	1:26
12.	"The Tyger"	Martin Swope	3:17
13.	"The Fundamental"	Roger Miller	2:45
14.	"Bridge Underwater"	Roger Miller	5:20
15.	"Chên/The Arousing"	Roger Miller	2:08
16.	"Final Motif"	Rick Scott	3:58
17.	"Pulse Piece"	Roger Miller	3:58
18.	"The Common Sparrow"	Martin Swope	3:58
19.	"POP Triassic"	Roger Miller	3:58

Disc two
No.	Title	Writer(s)	Length
1.	"Lost in the B-Zone"	Erik Lindgren	4:27
2.	"Waterwheel"	Roger Miller	3:53
3.	"Excavation No. 32"	Roger Miller	3:05
4.	"The Beat of the Mesozoic" (Part I)	Roger Miller	5:27
5.	"Scenes from a..."	Erik Lindgren	4:59
6.	"Jay Reeg Intro"		3:00
7.	"Carbon 14"	Roger Miller	3:15
8.	"Chariots of Fire"	Martin Swope	6:42
9.	"Lqabblil Insanya"	Roger Miller	2:50
10.	"Modern Warfare"	Erik Lindgren	3:57
11.	"Slo-Boy"	Erik Lindgren	1:26
12.	"Laramide Revolution"	Roger Miller	3:17
13.	"Pulse Piece"	Roger Miller	2:45

== Personnel ==
Adapted from Dawn of the Cycads liner notes.

Birdsongs of the Mesozoic

- Erik Lindgren: Minimoog, Memorymoog, drum machine, percussion
- Roger Miller: grand piano, Yamaha CP-70, percussion
- Rick Scott: Farfisa organ, Yamaha DX7, percussion
- Martin Swope: electric guitar, percussion

Additional musicians

- Your Neighborhood Saxophone Quartet: on "[Excerpts from] The Rite of Springs" and "The Fundamental"
- Michael Cohen: snare drum, rototoms and cymbal (1.1–1.16)
- Peter Prescott: tom toms on "Triassic, Jurassic, Cretaceous" and "POP Triassic"
- Steve Stain: percussion on "Triassic, Jurassic, Cretaceous" and "POP Triassic"
- Taki: percussion on "Shiny Golden Snakes" and "Bridge Underwater"
- Leon Janikian: Clarinet on "Sound Valentine"

Production and additional personnel

- Richard W. Harte – production, recording (2.6–2.13)
- Ted Jensen – remastering
- Tony Volante – recording (2.1–2.5), mixing (1.6–1.16, 2.1–2.5)
- Jeff Whitehead – recording (1.1–1.19), mixing (1.1–1.5, 1.19)
- Bob Winsor – mixing (1.17, 1.18)

== Release history ==
Region	Date	Label	Format	Catalog
United States	2008	Cuneiform	CD	Rune 274/275
