= Faultline (album) =

Studio album by Birdsongs of the Mesozoic
- Released: 1989
- Recorded: January – February 1989
- Studio: Lyx Studio (Worcester, MA)
- Genre: Avant rock, progressive rock, experimental rock
- Length: 57:22
- Label: Cuneiform
- Producer: Birdsongs of the Mesozoic, Bob Winsor

Birdsongs of the Mesozoic chronology
Sonic Geology (1988)	Faultline (1989)	Pyroclastics (1991)

Professional ratings
Review scores
Source	Rating
Allmusic	4/5 stars

Faultline is the second album of the American Avant-rock band Birdsongs of the Mesozoic, released in 1989 by Cuneiform Records.

The album was a transitional one for the band, as it was their first recording after the departure of Birdsongs co-founder Roger Miller who had been replaced by saxophonist Steve Adams. Adams soon left the band to join the saxophone quartet ROVA and was in turn replaced by Ken Field. Both Adams and Field recorded material for Faultline. The introduction of a saxophone also tilted the band’s sound slightly towards jazz, and away from the aggressive punk influenced version of prog rock featured on the band's earlier recordings.

== Track listing ==
No.	Title	Writer(s)	Length
1.	"The True Wheelbase"	Erik Lindgren	2:59
2.	"They Walk Among Us"	Martin Swope	3:35
3.	"Coco Boudakian"	Erik Lindgren	5:47
4.	"I Don't Need No Crystal Ball"	Steve Adams	3:20
5.	"Chariots of Fire"	Martin Swope	2:46
6.	"Magic Fingers (25¢)"	Erik Lindgren	6:08
7.	"Faultline"	Steve Adams	4:41
8.	"On the Street Where You Live"	Frederick Loewe/Martin Swope	4:05
9.	"Maybe I Will"	Rick Scott	6:08
10.	"There Is No One"	Erik Lindgren	3:44
11.	"Slo-Boy"	Erik Lindgren	4:26
12.	"Pteropold"	Erik Lindgren	4:30
13.	"Just Say Yes"	Steve Adams	5:13

== Personnel ==
Adapted from Faultline liner notes.

Birdsongs of the Mesozoic

- Steve Adams – tenor saxophone, alto saxophone, synthesizer, bass clarinet, drum machine, percussion
- Erik Lindgren – piano, sampler, trumpet, drum machine
- Ken Field – alto saxophone, soprano saxophone, percussion
- Rick Scott – synthesizer, percussion, piano
- Martin Swope – guitar, sampler, art direction

Additional musicians

- Willie Alexander – percussion (9, 10)

Production and additional personnel

- Birdsongs of the Mesozoic – production
- Kathy Chapman – photography
- Roger Seibel – mastering
- Ken Winokur – photography
- Bob Winsor – production, engineering

== Release history ==
Region	Date	Label	Format	Catalog
United States	1989	Cuneiform	CD, LP	Rune 19
