= Pyroclastics (album) =

Studio album by Birdsongs of the Mesozoic
- Released: 1992
- Recorded: March – June 1991
- Studio: Lyx Studio (Worcester, MA)
- Genre: Prog rock
- Length: 45:31
- Label: Cuneiform
- Producer: Birdsongs of the Mesozoic, Bob Winsor

Birdsongs of the Mesozoic chronology
Faultline (1989)	Pyroclastics (1992)	The Fossil Record 1980-1987 (1993)

Professional ratings
Review scores
Source	Rating
Allmusic	3.5/5 stars

Pyroclastics is the third studio album by Birdsongs of the Mesozoic, released on 1992 by Cuneiform Records. It was their final album with founding guitarist Martin Swope.

== Track listing ==
No.	Title	Writer(s)	Length
1.	"Shortwave Longride"	Erik Lindgren	5:59
2.	"Pleasure Island"	Erik Lindgren	6:06
3.	"I'm a Pterodactyl"	Martin Swope	2:58
4.	"Why Not Circulate"	Ken Field	3:55
5.	"Sled"	Erik Lindgren	4:50
6.	"The Simpsons"	Danny Elfman	1:57
7.	"Tyronglaea II"	Erik Lindgren	4:52
8.	"Papercutstone"	Martin Swope	4:52
9.	"Sombre Reptiles"	Brian Eno	3:59
10.	"Nothing But Trouble"	Erik Lindgren	1:59
11.	"Tomorrow Never Came"	Erik Lindgren	4:04
12.	"Our Prayer"	Brian Wilson	2:34

== Personnel ==
Adapted from Pyroclastics liner notes.

Birdsongs of the Mesozoic

- Ken Field – alto saxophone, soprano saxophone, synthesizer, percussion
- Erik Lindgren – piano, sampler, electronic drums, percussion
- Rick Scott – synthesizer, percussion
- Martin Swope – guitar, percussion

Additional musicians

- Willie Alexander – percussion (4, 7)
- Ken Winokur – percussion (4, 6)

Production and additional personnel

- Birdsongs of the Mesozoic – production
- Stephen Elston – illustrations, design, photography
- Nancy Given – illustrations, design
- Roger Seibel – mastering
- Scott Sternbach – photography
- Bob Winsor – production, mixing, recording

== Release history ==
Region	Date	Label	Format	Catalog
United States	1992	Cuneiform	CD, CS	Rune 35
