= Dancing on A'A =

Studio album by Birdsongs of the Mesozoic
- Released: 1995
- Recorded: October 1993 – April 1994 at Lyx Studio, Worcester, Massachusetts
- Genre: Progressive rock
- Length: 51:36
- Label: Cuneiform
- Producer: Birdsongs of the Mesozoic, Bob Winsor

Birdsongs of the Mesozoic chronology
The Fossil Record 1980-1987 (1993)	Dancing on A'A (1995)	Petrophonics (2000)

Professional ratings
Review scores
Source	Rating
Allmusic	3/5 stars

Dancing on A'A is the fourth album by Birdsongs of the Mesozoic, released in 1995 through Cuneiform Records. The title refers to a type of lava known as a'a, which has a sharp or spiky texture when cooled.

== Track listing ==
No.	Title	Writer(s)	Length
1.	"A Band of Deborahs (Not Debbies)"	Michael Bierylo	4:26
2.	"Dancing on A'A"	Erik Lindgren	4:52
3.	"Ptinct"	Erik Lindgren	4:23
4.	"Readymen"	Erik Lindgren	6:17
5.	"Birdgam"	Michael Bierylo	4:20
6.	"Electric Altamira"	Erik Lindgren	4:51
7.	"Swamp"	Roger Miller	7:11
8.	"Peter Gunn"	Henry Mancini	1:56
9.	"Ray"	Michael Bierylo	4:37
10.	"Sirius the Scorching"	Erik Lindgren	5:31
11.	"The Pearly Eyed March"	Ken Field	4:04

== Personnel ==
Birdsongs of the Mesozoic

- Michael Bierylo – guitar, percussion
- Ken Field – alto saxophone, soprano saxophone, flute, synthesizer, percussion
- Erik Lindgren – piano, organ, synthesizer, sampler, drum programming, percussion, photography
- Rick Scott – clarinet, synthesizer, electronic drums, percussion

Additional musicians and production

- Birdsongs of the Mesozoic – production
- Mickey Bones – drums, percussion
- Bill Carman – engineering
- Larry Dersch – drums
- Jim Doherty – drums, percussion
- Terry Donahue – drums
- David Hobbs – photography
- Diane Menyuk – design, illustrations
- Roger Seibel – mastering
- Ken Winokur – percussion
