= Extreme Spirituals =

Studio album by Birdsongs of the Mesozoic with Oral Moses
- Released: September 19, 2006
- Recorded: 2003 – 2006
- Studio: Various: Sounds Interesting; (Middleborough, MA; Virtual Planet; (Brookline, MA)
- Genre: Progressive rock
- Length: 55:36
- Label: Cuneiform
- Producer: Birdsongs of the Mesozoic

Birdsongs of the Mesozoic chronology
1001 Real Apes (2006)	Extreme Spirituals (2006)	Dawn of the Cycads (2008)

Professional ratings
Review scores
Source	Rating
Allmusic	4/5 stars

Extreme Spirituals is a collaborative studio album by the group Birdsongs of the Mesozoic and vocalist Oral Moses, released on September 19, 2006 by Cuneiform Records. The album consists of 19th-century Negro spiritual songs re-arranged in the experimental rock/classical style of the Boston-based Birdsongs of the Mesozoic.

== Track listing ==
No.	Title	Length
1.	"I'm a Rollin'"	5:32
2.	"Couldn't Hear Nobody Pray"	3:24
3.	"A Little More Faith in Jesus"	5:37
4.	"Sometimes I Feel Like a Motherless Child"	4:10
5.	"Joshua Fit the Battle of Jericho"	3:36
6.	"Swing Low Sweet Chariot"	4:18
7.	"Listen to the Angles Shoutin'"	4:22
8.	"Wayfaring Stranger"	4:14
9.	"Great Day"	5:05
10.	"Nobody Knows the Trouble I See"	5:13
11.	"Oh Freedom"	4:43
12.	"Amen"	5:22

== Personnel ==
Adapted from Extreme Spirituals liner notes.

Musicians

- Michael Bierylo – guitar, sampler, programming, recording
- Ken Field – saxophone, flute, percussion
- Erik Lindgren – grand piano, recording
- Oral Moses – vocals
- Rick Scott – synthesizer

Additional musicians

- Larry Dersch – drums (3, 8, 9)
- Terry Donahue – congas (1)
- Jason N. Marchionna – percussion (2, 5, 12)
- Ken Winokur – djembe (1)

Production and additional personnel

- Birdsongs of the Mesozoic – production
- Rich Durkee – mixing
- Diane Menyuk – design
- Chuck Sokol – assistant engineer
- Margaret Wiegel – photography
- Jonathan Wyner – mastering

== Release history ==
Region	Date	Label	Format	Catalog
United States	2006	Cuneiform	CD	Rune 241
