= The Iridium Controversy =

Studio album by Birdsongs of the Mesozoic
- Released: September 16, 2003
- Recorded: August 2002 – April 2003
- Studio: Various: Sounds Interesting; (Middleborough, MA; Virtual Planet; (Brookline, MA)
- Genre: Progressive rock
- Length: 60:49
- Label: Cuneiform
- Producer: Birdsongs of the Mesozoic

Birdsongs of the Mesozoic chronology
Petrophonics (2000)	The Iridium Controversy (2003)	1001 Real Apes (2006)

Professional ratings
Review scores
Source	Rating
Allmusic	4/5 stars

The Iridium Controversy is the sixth studio album by Birdsongs of the Mesozoic, released on September 16, 2003, by Cuneiform Records.

== Track listing ==
No.	Title	Writer(s)	Length
1.	"Primordial Sludge"	Erik Lindgren	5:46
2.	"The Iridium Controversy" (Before)	Erik Lindgren	2:59
3.	"The Iridium Controversy" (After)	Erik Lindgren	5:29
4.	"Make the Camera Dance"	Michael Bierylo	7:18
5.	"This Way Out"	Ken Field	4:21
6.	"Lost in the B-Zone"	Erik Lindgren	4:46
7.	"Tectonic Melange"	Rick Scott	4:07
8.	"Sherpas on Parade"	Michael Bierylo	6:02
9.	"100 Years of Excellence"	Erik Lindgren	5:41
10.	"Race Point"	Erik Lindgren	3:56
11.	"Centrifuge"	Ken Field	4:08
12.	"The Beat of the Mesozoic" (Part I)	Roger Miller	6:16

== Personnel ==
Adapted from The Iridium Controversy liner notes.

Birdsongs of the Mesozoic

- Michael Bierylo – guitar, sampler, programming, floor tom
- Ken Field – saxophone, flute, percussion
- Erik Lindgren – grand piano, organ, washboard
- Rick Scott – synthesizer, piano, percussion

Additional musicians

- Larry Dersch – drums and percussion (2, 3, 5, 8, 12)
- Terry Donahue – djembe and percussion (2, 3, 5, 8, 12)
- Roger Miller – piano (6, 12)
- Eric Paul – drums (1, 11)
- Ken Winokur – percussion

Production and additional personnel

- Birdsongs of the Mesozoic – production, engineering, recording
- Roger Dean – cover art, illustrations
- Mark Donahue – mastering
- Rich Durkee – mixing
- Claire Folger – photography
- Diane Menyuk – design

== Release history ==
Region	Date	Label	Format	Catalog
United States	2003	Cuneiform	CD	Rune 179
