= The Fossil Record 1980–1987 =

Compilation album by Birdsongs of the Mesozoic
- Released: 1993
- Recorded: May 1980 – August 1987
- Studio: Sounds Interesting (Middleborough, MA)
- Genre: Rock in Opposition
- Length: 71:20
- Label: Cuneiform
- Producer: Birdsongs of the Mesozoic

Birdsongs of the Mesozoic chronology
Pyroclastics (1992)	The Fossil Record 1980–1987 (1993)	Dancing on A'A (1995)

Professional ratings
Review scores
Source	Rating
Allmusic	4/5 stars

The Fossil Record 1980–1987 is a compilation album by Birdsongs of the Mesozoic, released in 1993 by Cuneiform Records. It comprises unreleased tracks from the band's early years.

== Track listing ==
No.	Title	Writer(s)	Length
1.	"Sound Valentine"	Roger Miller	3:16
2.	"Pulse Piece"	Roger Miller	3:07
3.	"The Transformation of Oz"	Roger Miller	2:21
4.	"Tyronglaea"	Roger Miller	2:44
5.	"Chên/The Arousing"	Roger Miller	1:56
6.	"Sombre Reptiles"	Brian Eno	3:08
7.	"Laramide Revolution"	Roger Miller	5:33
8.	"Out of Limits"	Michael Z. Gordon	2:34
9.	"Bill the Brontosaurus"	Erik Lindgren	4:11
10.	"Carbon 14"	Roger Miller	4:40
11.	"Modern Warfare"	Erik Lindgren	3:45
12.	"March"	Rick Scott	2:22
13.	"Lqabblil Insanya"	Roger Miller	4:36
14.	"Slo-Boy"	Erik Lindgren	3:48
15.	"To a Random"	Erik Lindgren, Roger Miller, Rick Scott, Martin Swope	23:19
16.	"Studio Talk"		1:37

== Release history ==
Region	Date	Label	Format	Catalog
United States	1993	Cuneiform	CD	Rune 55
