= Petrophonics =

Studio album by Birdsongs of the Mesozoic
- Released: September 19, 2000
- Recorded: June 1999 – April 2000 Sounds Interesting, Middleborough, Massachusetts
- Genre: Progressive rock
- Length: 66:18
- Label: Cuneiform
- Producer: Birdsongs of the Mesozoic

Birdsongs of the Mesozoic chronology
Dancing on A'A (1995)	Petrophonics (2000)	The Iridium Controversy (2003)

Professional ratings
Review scores
Source	Rating
Allmusic	4/5 stars
Alternative Press	4/5 stars

Petrophonics is the fifth studio album by rock band Birdsongs of the Mesozoic. It was released on September 19, 2000 through Cuneiform Records.

== Track listing ==
No.	Title	Writer(s)	Length
1.	"Petrophonics"	Michael Bierylo	6:17
2.	"Ptoccata II"	Erik Lindgren	5:14
3.	"One Hundred Cycles"	Ken Field	5:23
4.	"Nevergreen"	Erik Lindgren	7:32
5.	"Study of Unintended Consequences"	Rick Scott	4:25
6.	"Birdhead"	Erik Lindgren	4:00
7.	"Allswell That Endswell in Roswell"	Michael Bierylo	6:53

Music Inspired by 1001 Real Apes
No.	Title	Writer(s)	Length
8.	"Time Marches on Theme"	Erik Lindgren	3:15
9.	"Dinosaurs Theme"	Erik Lindgren	3:34
10.	"Gravity Theme"	Erik Lindgren	6:29
11.	"Quincy Sore Throat Theme"	Erik Lindgren	3:57

The Insidious Revenge of Ultima Thule
No.	Title	Writer(s)	Length
12.	"Part One"	Erik Lindgren	2:28
13.	"Part Two"	Erik Lindgren	3:25
14.	"Part Three"	Erik Lindgren	3:26

== Personnel ==
Birdsongs of the Mesozoic

- Michael Bierylo – guitar, percussion
- Ken Field – alto saxophone, soprano saxophone, flute, synthesizer, percussion
- Erik Lindgren – piano, organ, synthesizer, sampler, drum programming, percussion, photography
- Rick Scott – clarinet, synthesizer, electronic drums, percussion

Additional musicians and production

- Birdsongs of the Mesozoic – production
