= Collaborator (album) =

Studio album by Djam Karet
- Released: 1994
- Recorded: January – April 1994
- Genre: Progressive rock
- Length: 72:28
- Label: HC
- Producer: Gayle Ellett, Henry Osbourne

Djam Karet chronology
Burning the Hard City (1991)	Collaborator (1994)	The Devouring (1997)

Professional ratings
Review scores
Source	Rating
Allmusic	4/5 stars

Collaborator is the sixth studio album by Djam Karet, released in 1994 by HC Productions.

== Track listing ==
All music is composed by Djam Karet.

No.	Title	Length
1.	"Solar Flare"	3:21
2.	"Gondwanaland"	4:30
3.	"The Anointing of the Sick"	6:57
4.	"The Day After"	12:36
5.	"Foreign Lesion"	4:14
6.	"The 17th Karmapa"	3:02
7.	"Moorings"	6:52
8.	"Cliff Spirits"	4:01
9.	"Submersion"	5:54
10.	"Food Chain"	8:18
11.	"Salt Road"	6:05
12.	"The Fearful Void"	6:38

== Personnel ==
Adapted from Collaborator liner notes.

Djam Karet

- Gayle Ellett – 7-string guitar, 24-string steel acoustic guitar, guitar synthesizer, keyboards, sampler, congas, ocean drum, slit drum, talking drum, metal shakers, rainstick, percussion, electronics, production, mixing
- Mike Henderson – electric guitar, keyboards, electronics, slit drum, percussion
- Henry J. Osborne – 6-string bass guitar, keyboards, sampler, congas, metal shakers, electronics, percussion, production, mixing

Additional musicians

- Marc Anderson – sampler, berimbau and percussion (5)
- Jeff Greinke – keyboards, electronics (3, 12)
- Walter Holland – synthesizer (1, 8)
- Loren Nerell – synthesizer (7, 9)
- Steve Roach – Matrix 12 synthesizer, sampler and synthesizer (4, 10)
- Kit Watkins – hule, sampler and synthesizer (2, 7)
- Carl Weingarten – Dobro and electronics (2, 7)

Production and additional personnel

- Roger Seibel – mastering

== Release history ==
Region	Date	Label	Format	Catalog
United States	1994	HC	CD	HC008
