= Birdsongs of the Mesozoic (EP) =

EP by Birdsongs of the Mesozoic
- Released: 1983
- Recorded: August 1981 – December 1982
- Studio: Downtown Recorders (Boston, MA)
- Genre: Rock in Opposition
- Length: 16:57
- Label: Ace of Hearts
- Producer: Birdsongs of the Mesozoic, Richard W. Harte

Birdsongs of the Mesozoic chronology
Birdsongs of the Mesozoic (1983)	Magnetic Flip (1984)

Birdsongs of the Mesozoic is the eponymous first EP by the American Avant-rock band Birdsongs of the Mesozoic, released in 1983 by Ace of Hearts Records.

== Release and reception ==
Never being individually issued on Compact Disc, only some of Birdsongs of the Mesozoic had been included on compilations such as Sonic Geology and The Fossil Record. Finally, the entire EP was issued by Cuneiform Records on Dawn of the Cycads, a two-disc anthology including most of the band's early work.

== Track listing ==
All music is composed by Roger Miller, except "Drift" co-written with Martin Swope.

Side one
No.	Title	Length
1.	"Sound Valentine"	3:15
2.	"Transformation of Oz"	2:20
3.	"Drift"	2:39

Side two
No.	Title	Length
1.	"The Orange Ocean"	2:28
2.	"Triassic, Jurassic, Cretaceous"	6:15

== Personnel ==
Adapted from the Birdsongs of the Mesozoic liner notes.

Birdsongs of the Mesozoic

- Erik Lindgren – synthesizer, electronic drums
- Roger Miller – piano, snare drum, cymbal, voice, tom toms (A2, B2), reed organ (A1)
- Rick Scott – organ, maracas
- Martin Swope – electric guitar, cymbal, tape (A3, B2), acoustic guitar (A1)

Additional musicians

- Michael Cohen – cymbal and rototom (A2, B2)
- Leon Janikian – clarinet (A1)
- Karen Kaderavek – cello (B1)
- Peter Prescott – tom toms (B2)
- Steve Stain – percussion (B2)

Production and additional personnel

- Birdsongs of the Mesozoic – production
- Richard W. Harte – production
- Jeff Whitehead – engineering

== Release history ==
Region	Date	Label	Format	Catalog
United States	1983	Ace of Hearts	LP	AHS 1008
