= The Devouring =

The Devouring may refer to:

- The Devouring (novel), a 2008 teen horror novel by Simon Holt
- The Devouring (album), a 1997 album by Djam Karet
- The Devouring (Scooby-Doo! Mystery Incorporated), a Scooby-Doo! Mystery Incorporated episode
