= Magnetic Flip =

Studio album by Birdsongs of the Mesozoic
- Released: 1984
- Recorded: October 1983 – January 1984
- Studio: Downtown Recorders (Boston, MA)
- Genre: Rock in Opposition
- Length: 38:38
- Label: Ace of Hearts
- Producer: Richard W. Harte

Birdsongs of the Mesozoic chronology
Birdsongs of the Mesozoic (1983)	Magnetic Flip (1984)	Beat of the Mesozoic (1985)

Magnetic Flip is the debut studio album of the American avant-rock band Birdsongs of the Mesozoic, released in 1984 by Ace of Hearts Records.

== Release and reception ==
Professional ratings
Review scores
Source	Rating
Allmusic	3/5 stars
Christgau's Record Guide	A−

Magnetic Flip was released on vinyl in 1984. Some material was included on Compact Disc compilations such as Sonic Geology and The Fossil Record. The entire album was issued by Cuneiform Records on Dawn of the Cycads, a two-disc anthology that included most of the band's early work.

== Track listing ==
Side one
No.	Title	Writer(s)	Length
1.	"Shiny Golden Snakes"	Roger Miller	3:00
2.	"Ptoccata"	Erik Lindgren	3:15
3.	"(excerpts from) The Rite of Spring"	Igor Stravinsky	6:42
4.	"International Tours"	Erik Lindgren	2:50
5.	"Terry Riley's House"	Roger Miller	3:57

Side two
No.	Title	Writer(s)	Length
1.	"Theme from Rocky and Bullwinkle"	Frank Comstock/Fred Steiner	1:26
2.	"The Tyger"	Martin Swope	3:17
3.	"The Fundamental"	Roger Miller	2:45
4.	"Bridge Underwater"	Roger Miller	5:20
5.	"Chên/The Arousing"	Roger Miller	2:08
6.	"Final Motif"	Rick Scott	3:58

== Personnel ==
Adapted from the Magnetic Flip liner notes.

Birdsongs of the Mesozoic

- Erik Lindgren – synthesizer, percussion
- Roger Miller – piano, organ, percussion
- Rick Scott – piano, farfisa, synthesizer, percussion
- Martin Swope – guitar, percussion

Your Neighborhood Saxophone Quartet

- Steve Adams – saxophone
- Allan Chase – saxophone
- Tom Hall – saxophone
- Cercie Miller – saxophone

Additional musicians and production

- Birdsongs of the Mesozoic – mixing
- Michael Cohen – drums, percussion
- Richard W. Harte – production
- Taki – dono
- Tony Volante – mixing
- Jeff Whitehead – engineering, mixing

== Release history ==
Region	Date	Label	Format	Catalog
United States	1984	Ace of Hearts	LP	AHS 10018
