= Revolutionary Snake Ensemble =

- Origin: Boston, Massachusetts, US
- Genres: Funk, street beat
- Years active: 1990–present
- Labels: Cuneiform; Accurate; Innova
- Members: Ken Field; Tom Hall; Dave Harris; Phil Neighbors; Blake Newman; Jerry Sabatini
- Website: revolutionarysnakeensemble.org

The Revolutionary Snake Ensemble is an American instrumental musical group led by Boston, Massachusetts based saxophonist Ken Field. They performs an improvised style inspired by the second line brass bands of New Orleans parades. The group's colorful costumes and creative arrangements have earned it invitations to entertain audiences as large as 20,000

Revolutionary Snake Ensemble performances have included many venues including: the New Orleans Krewe of Muses Mardi Gras Parade, Kennedy Center for the Performing Arts, the Cambridge River Festival, the HONK! festival, Regattabar, the Central Square World's Fair, the Somerville Theater, First Night Boston, First Night Providence, First Night Fall River, the Boston Museum of Fine Arts, the Brooklyn Academy of Music, the Puffin Cultural Forum, Tipitina's (New Orleans) and the Berklee Performance Center.

The Ensemble can be heard on Parade of Numbers, an animated counting piece regularly aired on the beloved children's program Sesame Street, since 1995. It was animated by Field's late wife Karen Aqua (1954-2011).

Repeatedly nominated in their Best Music Poll by The Boston Phoenix and WFNX Radio, the Revolutionary Snake Ensemble includes a roster of notable Boston-area musicians. The group has been twice nominated by a panel of music writers and critics for a Boston Music Award, and was nominated Best Jazz Group in the 2014 New England Music Awards.

Their latest release, Live Snakes (Accurate Records 2014), was recorded in 2011 and 2013 in Boston, Brooklyn, & Manhattan, and documents four distinct incarnations of the ensemble, with two remixes by Field. "Live Snakes" features guest musicians Charles Neville, Josh Roseman, Kenny Wollesen, and Matt Darriau.

Forked Tongue, the group's second CD, was released May 13, 2008 on the Cuneiform label and includes, among other tracks, a brass reinterpretation of Billy Idol's "White Wedding." The CD was included on best-of-year lists from the Village Voice, Georgia Public Radio, the Postimees (Estonia), KMUW (Wichita), WFNX (Boston), WRUW (Cleveland), AllAboutJazz.com, WUSM (Madison, WI), WNMC (Detroit), and WUSB (Stony Brook, NY).

Year of the Snake was the group's debut CD, and includes interpretations of music by other artists including Field, Sun Ra, John Scofield and James Brown. Liner notes were contributed by music producer Scott Billington. The CD was listed as one of the top CDs of the year on New York NPR affiliate WNYC, in the New Orleans Gambit Weekly, and on Radio Popolare in Milan, Italy.

== Discography ==
Year of the Snake

- Released: November 11, 2003
- Format: CD
- Label: Innova
- Writers: Angel Gregorio Villoldo, Bob Pilkington, Derek van Beever, Eric Paull, Ethan Herschman, James Brown, James Crawford, John Scofield, Ken Field, Lennie Peterson, Manu Dibango, Sun Ra
- Tracks: Ten

Forked Tongue

- Released: May 13, 2008
- Format: CD
- Label: Cuneiform
- Writers: Ken Field, Norman Span, Ornette Coleman, Jay Livingston, Ray Evans, William Broad
- Tracks: Twelve

Live Snakes

- Released: 2014
- Format: CD
- Label: Accurate
- Tracks: Twelve

I Want That Sound!

- Released: October 28, 2016
- Format: CD
- Label: Innova
- Producer: Andy Pinkham, Ken Field
- Tracks: Eight

Serpentine

- Released: September 26, 2025
- Format: CD
- Label: Cuneiform
- Writers: Ken Field, Frank Zappa, Jason Candler, James Cleveland Moore, Sr.
- Tracks: Eleven
