= Beat of the Mesozoic =

EP by Birdsongs of the Mesozoic
- Released: 1985
- Recorded: March – August 1985
- Studio: Le Studio (Montreal, CA)
- Genre: Rock in Opposition
- Length: 21:51
- Label: Ace of Hearts
- Producer: Richard W. Harte

Birdsongs of the Mesozoic chronology
Magnetic Flip (1984)	Beat of the Mesozoic (1985)	Sonic Geology (1988)

Beat of the Mesozoic is the second EP by the American Avant-rock band Birdsongs of the Mesozoic, released in 1985 by Ace of Hearts Records.

== Release and reception ==
Professional ratings
Review scores
Source	Rating
AllMusic	2/5 stars

Brian Olewnick of AllMusic gave the album two out of five stars, saying that parts of the record "come across as affected and bland" and sometimes "a bit overwrought." However, he gave good mention to the track "The Beat of the Mesozoic, part I", concluding that at their best the band is "able to generate an infectious power and percussive drive that makes one wish for further explorations along that particular road."

Never being individually issued on Compact Disc, only some of Beat of the Mesozoic had been included on compilations such as Sonic Geology and The Fossil Record. Finally, the entire release was issued by Cuneiform Records on Dawn of the Cycads, a two-disc anthology including most of the band's early work.

== Track listing ==
Side one
No.	Title	Writer(s)	Length
1.	"Lost in the B-Zone"	Erik Lindgren	4:27
2.	"Waterwheel"	Roger Miller	3:53
3.	"Excavation No. 32"	Roger Miller	3:05

Side two
No.	Title	Writer(s)	Length
1.	"The Beat of the Mesozoic, part I"	Roger Miller	5:27
2.	"Scenes from a..."	Erik Lindgren	4:59

== Personnel ==
Adapted from the Beat of the Mesozoic liner notes.

Birdsongs of the Mesozoic

- Erik Lindgren – synthesizer, percussion
- Roger Miller – piano, organ, percussion
- Rick Scott – piano, farfisa, synthesizer, percussion
- Martin Swope – guitar, percussion

Production and additional personnel

- Richard W. Harte – production
- Tony Volante – engineering

== Release history ==
Region	Date	Label	Format	Catalog
United States	1985	Ace of Hearts	LP	AHS 10018
