= New Dark Age =

Studio album by Djam Karet
- Released: May 22, 2001
- Recorded: April – December 2000
- Studios: The Vault, Green Street, and Foggy Mountain Studios
- Genre: Progressive rock
- Length: 55:32
- Label: Cuneiform
- Producer: Djam Karet

Djam Karet chronology
Live at Orion (1999)	New Dark Age (2001)	Ascension (2001)

Professional ratings
Review scores
Source	Rating
Allmusic	4/5 stars

New Dark Age is the ninth studio album by Djam Karet, released on May 22, 2001, by Cuneiform Records.

== Track listing ==
All music is composed by Djam Karet.

No.	Title	Length
1.	"No Man's Land"	4:43
2.	"Eclipse of Faith"	2:43
3.	"Web of Medea"	7:04
4.	"Demon Train"	2:56
5.	"All Clear"	8:31
6.	"Raising Orpheus"	6:56
7.	"Kali's Indifference"	2:28
8.	"Alone With the River Man"	8:03
9.	"Going Home"	9:55
10.	"Eulogy"	2:13

== Personnel ==
Adapted from New Dark Age liner notes.

Djam Karet

- Gayle Ellett – electric guitar, organ, mellotron, synthesizer, electronics
- Mike Henderson – electric guitar, acoustic guitar, 12-string acoustic guitar, slide guitar, synthesizer, tape, electronics, percussion
- Chuck Oken Jr. – drums, percussion, synthesizer
- Henry J. Osborne – bass guitar, percussion

Additional musicians

- Loren Nerell – synthesizer (4, 10)
- Dion Sorell – cello (6)

Production and additional personnel

- Djam Karet – production
- Bill Ellsworth – cover art, design

== Release history ==
Region	Date	Label	Format	Catalog
United States	2001	Cuneiform	CD	Rune 149
