= Ascension (Djam Karet album) =

Studio album by Djam Karet
- Released: September 2001
- Recorded: April – December 2000
- Studio: The Vault, Green Street, and Foggy Mountain Studios
- Genre: Progressive rock
- Length: 46:13
- Label: HC
- Producer: Djam Karet

Djam Karet chronology
New Dark Age (2001)	Ascension (2001)	A Night for Baku (2003)

Ascension is the tenth studio album by Djam Karet, released on May 22, 2001 by HC Productions.

== Track listing ==
All music is composed by Djam Karet.

No.	Title	Length
1.	"Arose From the Ashes"	5:30
2.	"Licking the Skull"	1:51
3.	"The Hanging Tree"	6:58
4.	"Swimming in the Big Sky"	4:35
5.	"Special Cases"	4:46
6.	"Stage Three"	6:25
7.	"Disintegration"	16:08

== Personnel ==
Adapted from Ascension liner notes.

Djam Karet

- Gayle Ellett – electric guitar, 8-string lute, organ, wooden flute, synthesizer, tape, electronics, tape, electronics
- Mike Henderson – electric guitar, acoustic guitar, 12-string acoustic guitar, lap steel slide guitar, percussion, goblet drum, tape, electronics
- Chuck Oken, Jr. – drums, percussion, synthesizer, programming
- Henry J. Osborne – 5-string bass guitar, didgeridoo

Production and additional personnel

- Djam Karet – production

== Release history ==
Region	Date	Label	Format	Catalog
United States	2001	HC	CD	HC 012
