= The Ritual Continues =

Studio album by Djam Karet
- Released: 1987
- Recorded: February 1987
- Studio: Pitzer College (Claremont, CA)
- Genre: Progressive rock
- Length: 59:30
- Label: HC
- Producer: Rychard Cooper, Chuck Oken

Djam Karet chronology
No Commercial Potential (1985)	The Ritual Continues (1987)	Kafka's Breakfast (1988)

Professional ratings
Review scores
Source	Rating
Allmusic	2/5 stars

The Ritual Continues is the second studio album by Djam Karet, released in 1987 by HC Productions.

== Track listing ==
All music is composed by Djam Karet.

Side one
No.	Title	Length
1.	"Shamen's Descent"	7:18
2.	"A City With Two Tales"	10:25
3.	"The Black River"	6:22
4.	"Familiar Winds"	6:30

Side two
No.	Title	Length
1.	"Technology and Industry"	5:00
2.	"A Quiet Place"	10:45
3.	"The Ritual Continues"	8:30
4.	"Fractured"	4:40

1993 CD issue
No.	Title	Length
1.	"Shamen's Descent"	7:17
2.	"Tangerine Rabbit Jam"	4:07
3.	"Familiar Winds"	6:29
4.	"The Black River"	6:42
5.	"Technology and Industry"	5:00
6.	"The Ritual Continues"	8:34
7.	"Fractured"	4:42
8.	"Night Scenes"	5:37
9.	"Revisiting a Nice Place" (Falling Down 1993)	16:56

== Personnel ==
Adapted from The Ritual Continues liner notes.

Djam Karet

- Gayle Ellett – guitar, guitar synthesizer, percussion
- Andy Frankel – percussion on "A City With Two Tales" and "Fractured"
- Mike Henderson – guitar, twelve-string guitar, percussion
- Chuck Oken – drums keyboards, tape, percussion, production
- Henry J. Osborne – bass guitar, percussion

Production and additional personnel

- Randy Baker – photography
- Rychard Cooper – production, engineering, recording
- Loren Nerell – engineering, recording

== Release history ==
Region	Date	Label	Format	Catalog
United States	1987	HC	CS	HC 003
United States	1993	HC	CD	HC 007
