= Burning the Hard City =

Studio album by Djam Karet
- Released: 1991
- Recorded: January 1991 – April 1991
- Genre: Progressive rock
- Length: 70:01
- Label: HC
- Producer: Rob Dechaine, Djam Karet

Djam Karet chronology
Suspension & Displacement (1991)	Burning the Hard City (1991)	Collaborator (1994)

Professional ratings
Review scores
Source	Rating
Allmusic	4/5 stars

Burning the Hard City is the fifth studio album by Djam Karet, released in 1991 by HC Productions.

== Track listing ==
All music is composed by Djam Karet.

No.	Title	Length
1.	"At the Mountains of Madness"	9:19
2.	"Province 19: The Visage of War"	8:19
3.	"Feast of Ashes"	10:52
4.	"Grooming the Psychosis"	12:03
5.	"Topanga Safari"	6:02
6.	"Ten Days to the Sand"	11:13
7.	"Burning the Hard City"	12:09

== Personnel ==
Adapted from Burning the Hard City liner notes.

Djam Karet

- Gayle Ellett – electric guitar, seven-string guitar, guitar synthesizer, keyboards, tape, percussion
- Mike Henderson – electric guitar, acoustic guitar, twelve-string guitar, acoustic twelve-string guitar, keyboards, percussion
- Chuck Oken – drums, electronic drums, synthesizer, engineering
- Henry J. Osborne – five-string bass guitar, keyboards, percussion

Production and additional personnel

- Rob Dechaine – engineering, mixing, production
- Djam Karet – production
- Dave Druse – illustrations, design

== Release history ==
Region	Date	Label	Format	Catalog
United States	1991	HC	CD	HC 006
United States	2000	Cuneiform	CD	Rune 128
