= Suspension & Displacement =

Studio album by Djam Karet
- Released: 1991
- Recorded: July 1990 – April 1991
- Genre: Progressive rock
- Length: 70:29
- Label: HC
- Producer: Rob Dechaine, Djam Karet

Djam Karet chronology
Reflections from the Firepool (1989)	Suspension & Displacement (1991)	Burning the Hard City (1991)

Professional ratings
Review scores
Source	Rating
Allmusic	3/5 stars
Alternative Press	4/5 stars

Suspension & Displacement is the fourth studio album by Djam Karet, released in 1991 by HC Productions.

== Track listing ==
All music is composed by Djam Karet.

No.	Title	Length
1.	"Dark Clouds, No Rain"	10:59
2.	"8:15–No Safe Place"	4:45
3.	"Angels Without Wings"	5:03
4.	"Consider Figure Three"	7:50
5.	"Erosion"	13:01
6.	"Severed Moon"	6:30
7.	"The Naked and the Dead"	5:25
8.	"Gordon's Basement"	3:30
9.	"A City With Two Tales" (Part One Revisited 1990)	13:26

== Personnel ==
Adapted from Suspension & Displacement liner notes.

Djam Karet

- Gayle Ellett – electric guitar, seven-string guitar, guitar synthesizer, keyboards, tape, percussion
- Mike Henderson – electric guitar, acoustic guitar, twelve-string guitar, acoustic twelve-string guitar, keyboards, percussion
- Chuck Oken – drums, electronic drums, synthesizer
- Henry J. Osborne – five-string bass guitar, keyboards, percussion

Production and additional personnel

- Rob Dechaine – engineering, mixing, production
- Djam Karet – production
- Dave Druse – illustrations, design

== Release history ==
Region	Date	Label	Format	Catalog
United States	1991	HC	CD	HC 005
United States	2000	Cuneiform	CD	Rune 129
