= Birdsongs of the Mesozoic =

American musical group

- Origin: Boston, Massachusetts, U.S.
- Genres: Avant-prog
- Years active: 1980–present
- Labels: Ace of Hearts, Cuneiform
- Members: Michael Bierylo; Ken Field; Erik Lindgren; Rick Scott
- Past members: Steve Adams; Roger Miller; Martin Swope

Birdsongs of the Mesozoic is an American musical group founded in Boston, Massachusetts, United States, in 1980.

The music of Birdsongs of the Mesozoic is almost entirely instrumental, and incorporates many different musical elements; critic Rick Anderson writes, "Very few bands have ever managed to straddle the worlds of modern classical music and rock as successfully as this one did." In his liner notes for their Beat of the Mesozoic EP, Boston rock critic Eric Van dubbed them "the world's hardest-rocking chamber music quartet." Another memorable description came from Jim Sullivan of the Boston Globe: "classical-punk-jazz-car-wreck music."

== Band history ==
=== Origins ===
Birdsongs owes its origins to the 1978 breakup of the Boston post-punk band Moving Parts, which included Erik Lindgren (vocals, keyboards) and Roger Miller (vocals, guitar). Miller went on to form the seminal post-punk group Mission of Burma (1979–1983; 2002–present), while Lindgren concentrated on production work in his home recording studio.

While the Parts' breakup had been civil, Lindgren felt the need for an act of overt reconciliation, and in late 1980, he offered free studio time to his former bandmate should Miller have any non-Burma material he wanted to record. Miller had just written his first solo piano pieces in years, and jumped at the offer. Lindgren volunteered to provide some keyboard overdubs. Given that musical differences had led to the breakup of their earlier band, both musicians were surprised at the effectiveness of the collaboration. Burma tape loop artist Martin Swope was then enlisted for further overdub work on electric guitar.

The recording project might have ended there had not Boston's Modern Method record label approached Miller and asked for a Burma track for a compilation album. Miller instead offered "Pulse Piece" from the sessions, naming the makeshift group "Birdsongs of the Mesozoic," a reference to a Birdsongs of America album that Swope had sampled during the sessions and to then-new theories about the dinosaur ancestry of birds (Miller having been a dinosaur aficionado as a young child). The Mesozoic era covered the period of roughly 66 million years ago to 248 million years ago, and is sometimes called the "age of dinosaurs." The band created a Pterosaur silhouette as a logo, which they still use as of 2007, in a slightly modified version.

=== Birdsongs established and performs live ===
Nothing further might have come from the project had not Modern Method also asked Miller if Birdsongs could perform at the album's 1981 record release party. For this performance, a lineup was assembled consisting of Miller on piano, Lindgren on synthesizer, Swope on guitar, and Rick Scott on electronic organ, with all members doubling on percussion instruments. Miller and Scott had both previously lived in Ann Arbor, Michigan, where they had been bandmates in the short-lived Red Ants.

While there had been no intention to play more than the one gig, audience response was so strong that further shows were booked. The ensemble became a significant side project for Miller and Swope, and recorded a six-song eponymous EP (virtually the entire repertoire at the time) for Burma's label Ace of Hearts. Birdsongs opened for Burma at least once, and Burma's drummer Peter Prescott contributed to Birdsongs recordings and performances.

When Miller's tinnitus worsened in 1982, the existence of Birdsongs as a quieter alternative was a significant factor in Miller's decision to end Mission of Burma in 1983. In fact, he stopped writing Burma material and began writing more aggressive material for Birdsongs, such as "Shiny Golden Snakes" (which became the lead track of their first full-length album, Magnetic Flip.) After Burma's breakup, Birdsongs became democratized, and Swope, Scott, and especially Lindgren began composing original material. They toured regularly, mostly in the eastern United States and usually at rock music venues. Birdsongs of the Mesozoic opened for bands like Siouxsie and the Banshees, Echo and the Bunnymen, The Fall and Prescott's Volcano Suns. Jon Pareles, music critic of The New York Times, gave a positive review to the group's New York City debut, comparing their basic style to the minimalism of Philip Glass delivered with the energy and brevity of rock music: "In fact, most of the music is far more eventful, and less repetitious, than the average pop hit single."

They did occasional cover songs, which demonstrated the breadth of their influences: Adaptations of Stravinsky's The Rite of Spring, the theme songs to two animated television shows (Rocky & Bullwinkle and The Simpsons) and two different versions of Brian Eno's "Sombre Reptiles".

=== After Miller and Swope leave ===
In 1987 Miller left the group he founded to concentrate on his Maximum Electric Piano project, which he had recently begun as a side project to Birdsongs. Miller was replaced by another Ann Arbor expatriate, saxophonist/keyboardist Steve Adams of Your Neighborhood Saxophone Quartet (who had shared many bills with Birdsongs). With Adams on board, Birdsongs music had a new jazz element to their sound. Within six months, however, Adams was offered a position in the Rova Saxophone Quartet, and was replaced by saxophonist/flautist/keyboardist Ken Field. This lineup recorded two albums for Cuneiform Records (the first featuring Adams as well).

Swope left in 1993 and was replaced by guitarist Michael Bierylo. This lineup has remained stable to 2009, and has recorded several further albums for Cuneiform. The music of the current lineup has less punk sound and more modern classical and jazz colorings than the original line-up, but their music is still very eclectic.

In 2006, Birdsongs released Extreme Spirituals, a collection of traditional American gospel songs and spirituals, with singer Oral Moses.

== Discography ==
Studio albums

- Magnetic Flip (Ace of Hearts, 1984)
- Faultline (Cuneiform, 1989)
- Pyroclastics (Cuneiform, 1992)
- Dancing on A'A (Cuneiform, 1995)
- Petrophonics (Cuneiform, 2000)
- The Iridium Controversy (Cuneiform, 2003)

Live albums

- 2001 Live Birds (NEARfest Records, 2006)

Collaborative albums

- 1001 Real Apes (Pel Pel, 2006)
- Extreme Spirituals (Cuneiform, 2006)

EPs

- Birdsongs of the Mesozoic (Ace of Hearts, 1983)
- Beat of the Mesozoic (Ace of Hearts, 1986)

Compilations

- Sonic Geology (Rykodisc, 1988)
- The Fossil Record 1980-1987 (Cuneiform, 1993)
- Dawn of the Cycads (Cuneiform, 2008)
