= Recollection Harvest =

Studio album by Djam Karet
- Released: September 20, 2005
- Recorded: September 2004 – April 2005
- Genre: Progressive rock
- Length: 71:31
- Label: Cuneiform
- Producer: Djam Karet

Djam Karet chronology
A Night for Baku (2003)	Recollection Harvest (2005)	The Heavy Soul Sessions (2010)

Recollection Harvest is the twelfth studio album by Djam Karet, released on September 20, 2005 by Cuneiform Records.

== Track listing ==
All music is composed by Djam Karet.

No.	Title	Length
1.	"The March to the Sea of Tranquility"	7:20
2.	"Dr. Money"	7:14
3.	"The Packing House"	11:13
4.	"The Gypsy and the Hegemon"	9:23
5.	"Recollection Harvest"	10:36
6.	"Indian Summer"	4:10
7.	"Open Roads"	4:59
8.	"The Great Plains of North Dakota"	3:13
9.	"Dark Oranges"	3:46
10.	"Twilight in Ice Canyon"	5:19
11.	"Requiem"	4:18

== Personnel ==
Adapted from Recollection Harvest liner notes.

Djam Karet

- Gayle Ellett – electric guitar, organ
- Mike Henderson – electric guitar, acoustic guitar
- Chuck Oken, Jr. – drums, percussion, synthesizer

== Release history ==
Region	Date	Label	Format	Catalog
United States	2005	Cuneiform	CD	Rune 219
