= A Night for Baku =

A Night For Baku

Studio album by Djam Karet
- Released: 2003
- Genre: Progressive rock, post-rock
- Length: 59:51
- Label: Cuneiform Records
- Producer: Cuneiform Records

Djam Karet chronology
New Dark Age (2001)	A Night For Baku (2003)	Recollection Harvest (2005)

A Night for Baku is the 14th album by Djam Karet.

== Track listing ==
1. "Dream Portal" – 5:27
2. "Hungry Ghost" – 9:17
3. "Chimera Moon" – 7:08
4. "Heads on Ni-Oh" – 8:03
5. "Scary Circus" – 3:41
6. "Falafel King" – 3:23
7. "Sexy Beast" – 4:25
8. "Ukab Maerd" – 7:56
9. "The Red Thread" – 10:31

== Credits ==
- Gayle Ellett – Electric guitar, Ebow & Slide Guitar, Organ, Analog synth & Digital Synths, 8 String Lute, Theremin, Field Recordings & Effects
- Mike Henderson – Electric guitars, Ebow, Synths, Field Recordings & Effects
- Aaron Kenyon – Bass (Tracks 2, 4-7 & 9)
- Chuck Oken, Jr. – drums, percussion, Analog & Digital Synths, Sounds & Sequencing
- Henry J. Osborne – Bass (Tracks 1, 3, 5, & 8)

== Additional musicians ==
Steve Roach – Ending Guitar Atmospheres (Track 8)
