= Reflections from the Firepool =

Studio album by Djam Karet
- Released: 1989
- Recorded: September 1988 – May 1989
- Studio: Underground Railroad Studios
- Genre: Progressive rock
- Length: 65:38
- Label: HC Productions
- Producer: Rychard Cooper, Djam Karet

Djam Karet chronology
Kafka's Breakfast (1988)	Reflections from the Firepool (1989)	Suspension & Displacement (1991)

Professional ratings
Review scores
Source	Rating
Allmusic	2.5/5 stars

Reflections from the Firepool is the third studio album by American rock band Djam Karet.

== Release and reception ==
Allmusic reviewer François Couture preferred the band's later releases, noting that here "their assembling is a bit more crude." Despite this he praised the band for being at the top of their form, admitting that "all the elements that would constitute the band's sound for the next ten years are present." Glenn Astarita of All About Jazz shared much of the same criticisms, while noting that "the band goes for the jugular as they pursue impacting motifs amid heated interplay and cunning developments, in a loud yet purposeful sort of way."

In 2000, Cuneiform Records adopted and re-issued Reflections from the Firepool with an alternate cover.

== Track listing ==
All music is composed by Djam Karet.

No.	Title	Length
1.	"The Sky Opens Twice"	10:19
2.	"Fall of the Monkeywalk"	9:19
3.	"Run Cerberus Run"	6:45
4.	"Scenes from the Electric Circus"	7:08
5.	"Animal Origin"	7:17
6.	"All Doors Look Alike"	7:20
7.	"The Red Monk"	7:25
8.	"Reflections from the Firepool"	10:05

== Personnel ==
Adapted from Reflections from the Firepool liner notes.

Djam Karet

- Gayle Ellett – electric guitar, steel guitar, classical guitar, keyboards, tape, percussion
- Mike Henderson – electric guitar, acoustic guitar, twelve-string guitars, percussion
- Chuck Oken – drums, synthesizer, electronic drums, programming, engineering, mixing
- Henry J. Osborne – bass guitar, keyboards, percussion

Additional musicians

- Maxim J. Mahoney – saxophone

Production and additional personnel

- Rychard Cooper – production, engineering, mixing, goblet drum (2)
- Rob DeChaine – mixing
- Djam Karet – production
- Dave Druse – illustration, design

== Release history ==
Region	Date	Label	Format	Catalog
United States	1989	HC	CD, CS	HC017
United States	2000	Cuneiform	CD	Rune 139
