= Live at Orion =

Live album by Djam Karet
- Released: May 15, 1999
- Recorded: September 25 – September 26, 1998
- Studio: Orion Sound Studios (Baltimore, MD)
- Genre: Progressive rock
- Length: 74:37
- Label: Cuneiform
- Producer: Djam Karet

Djam Karet chronology
Still No Commercial Potential (1998)	Live at Orion (1999)	New Dark Age (2001)

Professional ratings
Review scores
Source	Rating
Allmusic	3/5 stars

Live at Orion is a 1999 live album by Californian progressive rock band Djam Karet.

== Track listing ==
All music is composed by Djam Karet.

No.	Title	Length
1.	"Technology and Industry"	5:18
2.	"Familiar Winds"	12:15
3.	"Forbidden by Rule"	8:02
4.	"Reflections From the Firepool"	9:32
5.	"Province 19: The Visage of War"	8:15
6.	"Shaman's Descent"	7:35
7.	"Jammin' at Mike & J's"	14:15
8.	"Run Cerberus Run"	9:25

== Personnel ==
Adapted from Live at Orion liner notes.

Djam Karet

- Gayle Ellett – electric guitar, keyboards, electronics, mixing
- Mike Henderson – electric guitar
- Chuck Oken Jr. – drums, keyboards, electronics
- Henry J. Osborne – bass guitar

Production and additional personnel

- Gary Fick – cover art
- Matt Murman – mastering
- Mike Potter – recording, mixing

== Release history ==
Region	Date	Label	Format	Catalog
United States	1999	Cuneiform	CD	Rune 199
