= No Commercial Potential =

Studio album by Djam Karet
- Released: 1987
- Recorded: April 1985
- Studio: Parsch Place Studio
- Genre: Progressive rock
- Length: 57:25
- Label: HC

Djam Karet chronology
No Commercial Potential (1987)	The Ritual Continues (1987)

Professional ratings
Review scores
Source	Rating
Allmusic	2/5 stars

No Commercial Potential was the debut studio album of Djam Karet, released in 1985 by HC Productions.

== Track listing ==
All music is composed by Djam Karet.

Side one
No.	Title	Length
1.	"Whare's L. Ron ??!!"	16:45
2.	"Dwarf Toss"	11:15

Side two
No.	Title	Length
1.	"Blue Fred"	29:25

2004 re-issue bonus disc
No.	Title	Length
1.	"The Building"	20:03
2.	"The Door"	7:56
3.	"The Window"	27:22

== Personnel ==
Adapted from No Commercial Potential liner notes.

Djam Karet

- Gayle Ellett – guitar
- Mike Henderson – guitar
- Chuck Oken – drums
- Henry J. Osborne – bass guitar

Production and additional personnel

- Rychard Cooper – mastering, recording
- Djam Karet – mastering
- Loren Nerell – recording

== Release history ==
Region	Date	Label	Format	Catalog
United States	1985	HC	MC	HC 002
United States	2004	HC	CD	HC 013
