= The Heavy Soul Sessions =

Studio album by Djam Karet
- Released: October 17, 2010
- Recorded: Fall 2009
- Studio: White Arrow Studios (California)
- Genre: Progressive rock
- Length: 64:36
- Label: HC
- Producer: Djam Karet

Djam Karet chronology
Recollection Harvest (2005)	The Heavy Soul Sessions (2010)	The Trip (2013)

Professional ratings
Review scores
Source	Rating
All About Jazz	4/5 stars

The Heavy Soul Sessions is the thirteenth studio album by Djam Karet, released on October 17, 2010 by HC Productions.

== Track listing ==
All music is composed by Djam Karet, except "Dedicated to K.C." by Richard Pinhas.

No.	Title	Length
1.	"Hungry Ghost"	8:34
2.	"The Red Threaded Sexy Beast"	12:43
3.	"Consider Figure Three"	9:46
4.	"The Packing House"	12:56
5.	"Dedicated to K.C."	9:43
6.	"The Gypsy and the Hegemon"	10:54

== Personnel ==
Adapted from The Heavy Soul Sessions liner notes.

Djam Karet

- Gayle Ellett – organ, synthesizer, mellotron, mixing, mastering
- Mike Henderson – electric guitar, electronics, engineering
- Aaron Kenyon – 5-string bass guitar, electronics
- Mike Murray – electric guitar, electronics
- Chuck Oken, Jr. – drums, engineering

Production and additional personnel

- Djam Karet – production

== Release history ==
Region	Date	Label	Format	Catalog
United States	2010	HC	CD	HC 015
