= The Space Negros =

1970s American rock band

The Space Negros was a late 1970s experimental rock band that disbanded, and regrouped in the early 1980s.

The Space Negros began as an avant-garde four-person Boston-based group in the late 1970s. Composer-pianist Erik Lindgren was the head of this ensemble. One of the band's records was a reissue of a 1980 release.
