= The Devouring (album) =

Studio album by Djam Karet
- Released: September 16, 1997
- Recorded: March 1996 – March 1997
- Genre: Progressive rock
- Length: 71:06
- Label: Cuneiform
- Producer: Djam Karet

Djam Karet chronology
Collaborator (1994)	The Devouring (1997)	Still No Commercial Potential (1998)

Professional ratings
Review scores
Source	Rating
Allmusic	4/5 stars

The Devouring is the seventh studio album by Djam Karet, released on September 16, 1997, by Cuneiform Records.

== Track listing ==
All music is composed by Djam Karet.

No.	Title	Length
1.	"Night of the Mexican Goat Sucker"	7:07
2.	"Forbidden by Rule"	5:57
3.	"Lost, But Not Forgotten"	7:46
4.	"Lights Over Roswell"	6:48
5.	"Myth of a White Jesus"	4:21
6.	"The River of No Return"	8:51
7.	"Room 40"	8:41
8.	"The Indian Problem"	5:37
9.	"The Pinzler Method"	4:52
10.	"Old Soldier's Disease"	11:06

== Personnel ==
Adapted from The Devouring liner notes.

Djam Karet

- Gayle Ellett – electric guitar, 12-string acoustic guitar, 24-string steel acoustic guitar, koto, guitar synthesizer, keyboards, organ, mellotron, sampler, theremin, electronics, percussion
- Chuck Oken Jr. – drums, percussion, keyboards
- Henry J. Osborne – bass guitar, electric guitar, acoustic guitar, keyboards, percussion

Additional musicians

- Judy Garp – violin (4)
- Mike Henderson – electric guitar and 12-string electric guitar (1–3, 5)

Production and additional personnel

- Dave Druse – cover art
- Djam Karet – production, recording, mixing

== Release history ==
Region	Date	Label	Format	Catalog
United States	1997	Cuneiform	CD	Rune 99
