= "TV Guide" Top Television Themes =

TV Guide Top Television Themes

Studio album by Warren Barker and Frank Comstock
- Released: 1959
- Studio: Warner Bros.
- Genres: Big band, pop
- Label: Warner Bros. Records

TV Guide Top Television Themes is an LP of twelve musical themes from popular television programs of the late 1950s.

== Origin and concept ==
In May 1959, Warner Bros. Records announced the release of an album produced in cooperation with the weekly television program listings magazine TV Guide. Warner was said to be intrigued by the growing popularity of TV theme songs and the "fresh, new sounds and extraordinary harmonies to be heard in these themes," and "asked the editors of 'TV Guide' to select a list of 12 outstanding TV shows whose themes are rapidly being written into our music folklore."

The record incorporated four themes from programs running on each of the three television networks ABC, CBS, and NBC. Promotional tie-ins that accompanied the release included featuring the album on the TV shows whose themes are heard, and distributing more than 500 copies of the album to TV columnists. By year's end, "TV Guide" Top Television Themes became the fifth best-selling album in the first year of the label's operation.

== Reception ==
In its May 18, 1959, issue, Billboard magazine listed "TV Guide" Top Television Themes among its Spotlight Winners of the Week, describing it as having outstanding sales potential that could turn it into a big seller, with plenty of musical value.

Reviewing the album, The Cash Box magazine complimented the "swinging big band renditions" of "Mickey Mouse Club," "The Real McCoys", and "Playhouse 90," concluding that in light of "the present TV theme trend, this set could do exceedingly well."

HiFi Review said, "The arrangements are good big band jazz, and stereo even goes television one better by spreading the sound out beyond the confines of a 21-inch screen."

== Track listing ==
Track	Title	Composers	Network
1	"The D.A.'s Man"	Frank Comstock	NBC
2	"Perry Mason"	Fred Steiner	CBS
3	"77 Sunset Strip"	Jerry Livingston, Mack David	ABC
4	"Pete Kelly's Blues”	Ray Heindorf, Sammy Cahn	NBC
5	"Mickey Mouse Club"	Jimmie Dodd	ABC
6	"Maverick"	David Buttolph, Paul Francis Webster	ABC
7	"Peter Gunn"	Henry Mancini	NBC
8	"Have Gun – Will Travel"	Bernard Herrmann	CBS
9	"Richard Diamond"	Pete Rugolo	CBS
10	"Playhouse 90"	Alex North	CBS
11	"The Real McCoys"	Harry Ruby	ABC
12	"M Squad"	Count Basie	NBC
