= The Trip (Djam Karet album) =

Studio album by Djam Karet
- Released: April 23, 2013
- Recorded: White Arrow Studios (California)
- Genre: Progressive rock
- Length: 47:08
- Label: HC
- Producer: Djam Karet

Djam Karet chronology
The Heavy Soul Sessions (2010)	The Trip (2013)	Regenerator 3017 (2014)

The Trip is the fourteenth studio album by the rock band Djam Karet. It was released in 2013 on HC Productions.

== Track listing ==
All music is composed by Djam Karet

No.	Title	Length
1.	"The Trip"	47:08

== Personnel ==
Adapted from The Trip liner notes.

Djam Karet

- Gayle Ellett – Greek bouzouki, Moog synthesizer, organ, mellotron, tape, electronics, flute, mixing, mastering
- Mike Henderson – electric guitar, electronics
- Aaron Kenyon – electric 5-string bass, electronics
- Mike Murray – electric guitar, acoustic guitar, electronics
- Chuck Oken, Jr. – drums, percussion, synthesizer, electronics, recording

== Release history ==
Region	Date	Label	Format	Catalog
United States	2013	HC	CD	HC016
