= Regenerator 3017 =

Studio album by Djam Karet
- Released: February 25, 2014
- Recorded: June 2012 – December 2013
- Studio: Various: Foggy Mountain Studios; (Topanga, CA); White Arrow Studios; (California)
- Genre: Progressive rock
- Length: 40:58
- Label: HC
- Producer: Gayle Ellett

Djam Karet chronology
The Trip (2013)	Regenerator 3017 (2014)

Professional ratings
Review scores
Source	Rating
All About Jazz	4/5 stars

Regenerator 3017 is the fifteenth studio album by Djam Karet, released on February 25, 2014 by HC Productions.

== Track listing ==
All music is composed by Djam Karet.

No.	Title	Length
1.	"Prince of the Inland Empire"	5:35
2.	"Living in the Future Past"	4:50
3.	"Desert Varnish"	7:19
4.	"Wind Pillow"	4:39
5.	"Lost Dreams"	3:51
6.	"Empty House"	6:08
7.	"On the Edge of the Moon"	8:36

== Personnel ==
Adapted from Regenerator 3017 liner notes.

Djam Karet

- Gayle Ellett – electric guitar, Greek bouzouki, Rhodes piano, Moog synthesizer, Solina String Ensemble, mellotron, tape, production, mixing, mastering
- Mike Henderson – electric guitar, percussion
- Chuck Oken, Jr. – drums, percussion, keyboards, electronics
- Henry J. Osborne – bass guitar, piano, percussion

Additional musicians

- Mark Cook – Warr Guitar (2)
- Mike Murray – electric guitar

== Release history ==
Region	Date	Label	Format	Catalog
United States	2014	HC	CD	HC017
