= Still No Commercial Potential =

Studio album by Djam Karet
- Released: 1998
- Recorded: June 13 – August 1, 1998
- Studio: Hotel of Noise, Room 24 (Pomona, CA)
- Genre: Progressive rock
- Length: 70:31
- Label: HC
- Producer: Djam Karet

Djam Karet chronology
The Devouring (1997)	Still No Commercial Potential (1998)	Live at Orion (1999)

Still No Commercial Potential is the eighth studio album by Djam Karet, released in 1998 by HC Productions.

== Track listing ==
All music is composed by Djam Karet.

No.	Title	Length
1.	"No Vacancy at the Hotel of Noise"	7:08
2.	"Twilight in Lonely Hands"	7:19
3.	"Room 24, Around Noon"	8:48
4.	"The Black Line"	10:06
5.	"Night But No Darkness"	8:16
6.	"Strange Wine From a Twisted Fruit"	28:54

== Personnel ==
Adapted from Still No Commercial Potential liner notes.

Djam Karet

- Gayle Ellett – electric guitar, organ, percussion
- Mike Henderson – electric guitar, engineering
- Chuck Oken, Jr. – drums, percussion, keyboards
- Henry J. Osborne – 5-string bass guitar, didgeridoo, percussion

Production and additional personnel

- Djam Karet – production, cover art, design
- Bill Ellsworth – cover art, design
- Matt Murman – mastering

== Release history ==
Region	Date	Label	Format	Catalog
United States	1998	HC	CD	HC009
