= Karen Aqua =

American filmmaker and animator

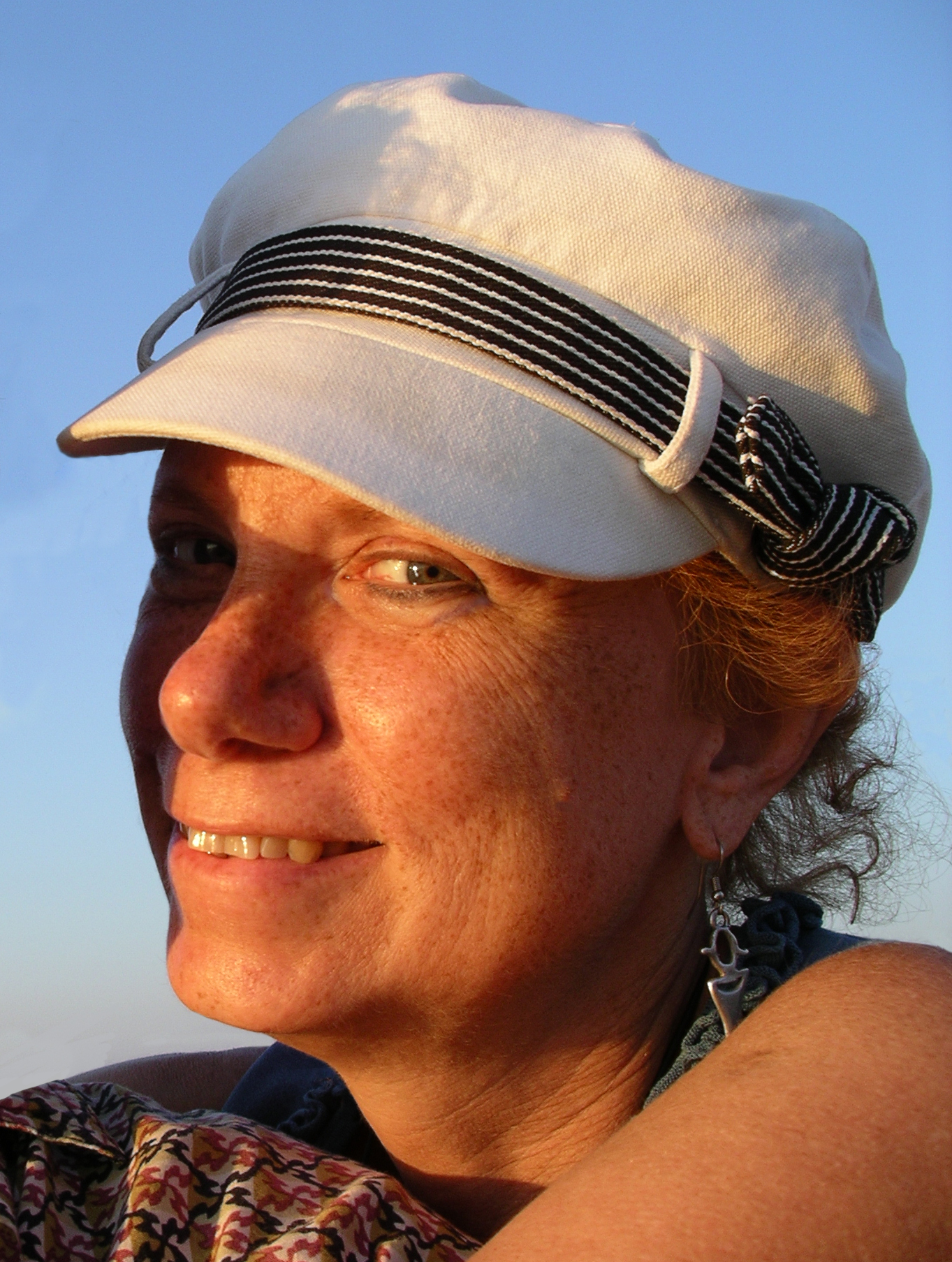
Aqua in 2010

Karen Aqua (February 2, 1954 – May 30, 2011) was an American filmmaker and animator.

== Early life ==
Aqua was born in 1954 in Wilkes-Barre, Pennsylvania and grew up in the nearby town of Forty Fort. She graduated in 1972 from Wyoming Valley West Senior High School in Plymouth, Pennsylvania. She graduated from RISD in 1976 with a bachelor of fine arts degree.

== Career ==
Over the course of her career, Aqua completed 12 animated films and one collaborative animation/live action video. Her films explore "the themes of ritual, journeys, transformation, and the human spirit. Much of her work reflects an interest in symbols, mythology, and prehistoric and tribal cultures, and include elements of rhythm, dance, and music."

She wrote the lyrics and melody for the majority of her animations. She frequently collaborated with her husband, Ken Field, on the melody for some pieces, as well as chords and arrangements for the majority of them.

In 1990, she began producing animated shorts for Sesame Street. In total, she produced, directed, and animated 22 segments for the show.

Aqua taught workshops at Emerson College and Boston College. She received grants and commissions from such organizations as the American Film Institute, The MacDowell Colony, Millay Colony for the Arts, Fundación Valparaíso (Spain), New England Film/Video Fellowship Program, Berkshire Taconic Trust, LEF Foundation, Puffin Foundation, and the Massachusetts Cultural Council. She served as a juror for film festivals in Japan, Canada, and the US, and has presented numerous one-person screenings of her work.

== Personal life ==
She married her husband Ken Field in 1984. Aqua died in May 2011 of ovarian cancer at age 57, after battling the illness for a decade. Upon her death, over 300 of her film and video works were donated to the Harvard Film Archive in Cambridge, Massachusetts.

== Films ==
- Penetralia (1976)
- Heavenly Bodies (1980)
- Vis-á-Vis (1982)
- Yours for the Taking (1984)
- Nine Lives (1987)
- Kakania (1989; title sequence)
- Animals on Parade (1990)
- Perpetual Motion (1992)
- Dance to the Rhythm (1993)
- Ground Zero/Sacred Ground (1997)
- Building a Rhythm (1998)
- Andaluz (2004)
- Sensorium (2007)
- Twist of Fate (2009)
- Taxonomy (2011)

=== Sesame Street ===
- Animals on Parade
- Dance to the Rhythm
- Fast/Slow
- Forward/Backward
- Building a Rhythm
- Pass-Along Alphabet
- Rhyme Time
