= The Devouring (novel) =

2008 teen horror novel by Simon Holt

- First edition
- Author: Simon Holt
- Language: English
- Genre: Horror novel, young adult novel
- Published: September 1, 2009
- Publisher: Little, Brown and Company
- Publication place: United States

The Devouring is a teen horror novel by author Simon Holt. This book was published by Little, Brown Books for Young Readers on September 1, 2008. The Devouring is the first in a series; the second book, titled The Devouring #2: Soulstice, was released September 1, 2009, while the third book titled Fearscape was released in 2010.

== Plot summary ==
When dark creeps in and eats the light,
Bury your fears on Sorry Night,
For in the winter's blackest hours,
Comes the feasting of the Vours,
No one can see it, the life they stole,
Your body's here but not your soul...

The story follows Reggie and her best friend Aaron, two horror buffs who discover an old, anonymous journal written by a woman believed to be crazy. The entries refer to demonic creatures called Vours who steal people's souls on the night of the Winter Solstice, known in the book as Sorry Night.

Reggie and Aaron think that Vours are just a silly legend so they try to summon them on the Winter Solstice. To summon them, they decide to face their worst fears not realizing the bravery drives the Vours away. Reggie lets a spider crawl over her body and Aaron stays underwater for a period of time. However, neither one of them becomes a Vour. Discouraged, the teens forget about the Vours until Reggie's little brother Henry starts acting strange. Once a happy-go-lucky kid, Henry becomes violent and rude, destroying his favorite stuffed animal and drowning his pet hamster. He becomes super-sensitive to the cold and spends his time in front of the fireplace, something very out of character for him. When he's hit by a snowball, black marks spread across his skin like a rash. He even attempts to murder Aaron in cold blood.

Realizing what's happened to Henry, Reggie tries to learn more about the Vours and somehow rescue Henry. In the process, she must face all of her worst fears, along with all of Henry's.

== Characters ==
Vours: Vours are creatures that inhabit a person's body on Sorry Night, December 21, and assume the host's body. They also have access to the host's personality and memories. It's hard to spot a person who has been taken over by a vour. However, a few key signs are: they cannot cry, they hate the cold, and they have a fixation with heat and sweets. When outside of the human victim, they manifest as a black oily smoke but can only hold that shape for a limited time. The human host's consciousness is forced into a nightmare world called a fearscape. Vours have the ability to sense what you fear in both human and non-human form. They can also cause you to hallucinate and make you feel as if it is truly happening.

Reggie There's nothing like a good, gory, horror flick for this fifteen-year-old high school girl. One day Reggie finds a journal called The Devouring in the book shop where she works. Thinking it's just an innocent horror book, she reads it to her younger brother Henry. Reggie also has a major crush on Quinn the football jock with an amazing body. Later, on the night of Sorry Night (December 21), Reggie and her best friend Aaron perform a ritual to bring the Vours to them, just to see if it is true. Meanwhile, Henry is terrified in his room, and the Vour comes and takes over his body. For a while, Reggie doesn't believe a Vour is controlling her little brother, but once convinced she is determined to save Henry.

Aaron: Reggie's best friend. Aaron has a fascination with horror, similar to Reggie. However, his is real. While Reggie enjoys horror fiction, Aaron is drawn to real life serial killers and their doings. Aaron's greatest fear is drowning, having slipped under the ice at some stage in his life and almost died. He is also the one that discovered Henry being a Vour. Aaron is very overprotective of Reggie and would risk his life and do anything for her to make sure shes safe. He also has secretive crush on Reggie which makes him drawn to her. He makes money by doing other people's homework.

Henry: Reggie's little brother, who is taken over by a Vour. Henry is greatly attached to Reggie after their mother left them without even a goodbye. The story starts with Reggie reading to Henry about the Vours from Macie's journal. Henry tries to be brave and looks to horror movies to help him get over his fears. However, being so young, his fears consume him and allows the Vour to get in.

Macie Canfield: The author of The Devouring journal. Her brother's dead body is found in a hidden room of the basement where she used to live. She lived with the Vour for decades before her brother fell ill. She recorded all of her findings, her words, her understanding and knowledge into her journal. She recounted the moment the Vour took over her brother and the years following. The journal gives Reggie and Aaron information on how to defeat Henry's Vour.

Quinn Waters: Quinn is a laid back, easy going, football player. He's good looking and kind to everyone he meets. He has enlisted Aaron to write his essays for him, paying him $50. He appears to be interested in Reggie, talking to her, and helping her brother when he's on the streets alone at night. But things take a dangerous turn when Quinn is not all he appears to be.

Eben: An old man who owns the book store that Reggie works in. They are close and banter often about who is the better poet or writer. Eben is a mysterious man who appears to know nothing about Vours. This is, however, later proven false when one of the Vours recognizes him. He helps Aaron and Reggie with their quest to save Henry.

Mr. Halloway: Mr. Halloway is the father of Reggie and Henry. Ever since his wife left them he kept to himself, and was always busy with work. He relies heavily on Reggie to keep the house in order and to take care of Henry while he is gone. He does not suspect anything is wrong with Henry after he has been taken over.
