= Carl Weingarten =

American guitarist and photographer

- Born: Dayton, Ohio
- Genres: Americana, ambient, world, space rock
- Occupations: Musician, composer, producer, photographer
- Instrument: Guitar
- Years active: 1970s–present
- Label: Multiphase Records
- Formerly of: Delay Tactics, The Court Musicians
- Website: www.carlweingarten.com

Carl Weingarten is an American guitarist, photographer, and founder of the independent music label Multiphase Records. He is best known for his atmospheric sound and use of the slide guitar and Dobro. Weingarten has played a significant role in progressive underground music for over 40 years, recording several solo and collaborative instrumental albums and signing various musicians to his label.

== Biography ==
Before acquiring a taste in music, Weingarten gained an interest in photography early on; at seven years old, he received his first camera as a Christmas gift. By junior high, Weingarten moved on to shooting Super 8 films, and was awarded two Honorable Mentions in the Kodak Teenage Movie Awards. However, in high school, he also aspired to teach himself how to play slide guitar after his first exposure to blues.

Weingarten later earned a degree in cinema production which would go hand in hand with the atmospheric music he would later become known for. According to Weingarten, "The cinematic tone in my music comes from my visual arts background. I try to paint it all in sound." However, breaking into the film industry proved difficult in the mid-west, and he began writing and recording his own film scores and other music for modern dance companies. This led him to join the indie label movement.

Weingarten founded Multiphase Records in St. Louis in 1980. The following year, he released its first album, Submergings, in collaboration with Gale Ormiston and Phil Neon. That same year gave birth to Weingarten's instrumental electronic rock band Delay Tactics. The group, featuring Walter Whitney on synths and guitarists David Udell and Reed Nesbit, took heavy influence from Robert Fripp and served as more of a recording unit than live act. They were, however, among the first of such indie groups to use digital delays in both studio recordings and live looping performances. With two albums under their belt, the group disbanded in 1986. The members regrouped in 2016 and a third record, Elements of Surprise (MP-CD127) was released in 2023.

In the 1990s, Weingarten moved to San Francisco and continued producing his own solo and collaboration albums and toured. He reunited multiple times with Walter Whitney among other musicians in producing a broad catalog of studio recordings. In 1995, several musicians were brought together under the Court Musicians moniker to record an album fusing various cultural styles; two of such tracks featured Weingarten on guitar, and his experience with the project's Indian themes had a profound influence on him musically. He has more recently moved to Alameda, California and continued releasing new music throughout the 2000s.

Weingarten's records have received praise by media outlets such as All About Jazz, Muze.com, Music Web Express, Exposé magazine, and AllMusic among others. With influences spanning Ennio Morricone, Brian Eno, Antonio Vivaldi, and Robert Johnson among others, his albums have often been described as sounding more akin to a thematic soundtrack than a more formal collection of songs, and his innovative style blending and experimentation have been widely commended. In 2002, Weingarten released one of his most critically acclaimed works, escapesilence. The record would become an NPR staple and the winner of the "Listeners Choice Award" from the syndicated PRI program Echoes.

Despite his success in the music industry, Weingarten is still an avid photographer. Today, a gallery of photos can be viewed at his website focusing on subjects like urban landscapes and architecture, natural landscapes, concerts, and nightlife. The site also offers digital restoration of old photos, and his work has been featured in exhibits such as the Frank Bette Center for the Arts.

== Equipment ==
- Dobro
- Traveler guitar
- Slide guitar
- EBow

== Discography ==
=== With Delay Tactics ===
- Out-Pop Options (1982, 2000 re-release)
- Any Questions? (1984, 2000 re-release)
- Imperfect Strangers (2020 Compilation)
- Elements of Surprise (2023 release)

=== Solo ===
- Living in the Distant Present (1985)
- Laughing at Paradise (1988)
- Pandora's Garage (1992)
- Slide of Hand (1992)
- Redwood Melodies: A Traveler's Companion (1995)
- The Acoustic Shadow (1995)
- Blue Faith (2000)
- escapesilence (2002)
- Hand in the Sand: A Collection – 1990–2004 (2004)
- Local Journeys (2005)
- Lost in the Air (2008)
- Panomorphia (2012)
- Life Under Stars (2014)
- This Is Where I Found You (2018 feat. Ulrich Schnauss)
- Ember Days (2020)
- Stop Me Try (2022)
- The Simian River Collection 1980-2020 (2023)

=== Collaborations ===
- Submergings: A Study in Sonic Ambiance w/ Gale Ormiston & Phil Neon (1981, 2001 re-release)
- Windfalls w/ Gale Ormiston (1983)
- Dreaming in Colors w/ Walter Whitney (1986, 2018 re-release)
- Primitive Earth w/ Walter Whitney (1990)
- Critical Path w/ Joe Venegoni (1991)
- At the Court of the Chera King, featured on two tracks w/ The Court Musicians (1995)
- Silent Night w/ Joe Venegoni (1998)
- Invisibility w/ Forrest Fang (2006)
- Where There Is Light (as Weingarten-Charlton) w/ Catherine Marie Charlton (2017)
