= Frank Comstock =

American composer, arranger, conductor, and trombonist

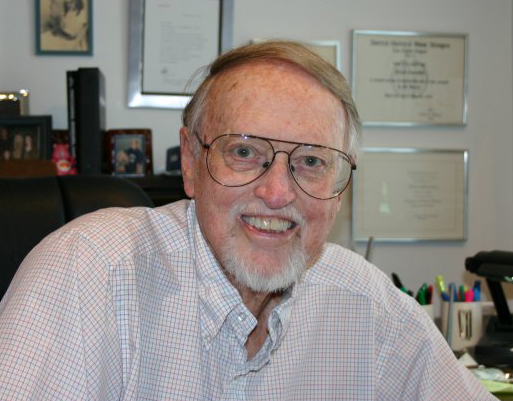
- Frank Comstock (2004)

Background information
- Born: September 20, 1922; San Diego, California, U.S.
- Died: May 21, 2013 (aged 90) Huntington Beach, California, U.S.
- Occupations: Composer, arranger and conductor
- Instrument: Trombone
- Years active: 1939–2009

Frank G. Comstock (September 20, 1922 – May 21, 2013) was an American composer, arranger, conductor, and trombonist. For television, Comstock wrote and arranged music for major situation comedies and variety shows. His theme and incidental music for Rocky and His Friends (1959–1964) are probably his best-remembered works. Additionally, his music for Adam-12 earned him a 1971 Emmy nomination.

Comstock's recording credits include eight Hi-Lo's albums and backing arrangements for major recording stars. His 1962 instrumental album, Project: Comstock - Music from Outer Space became a classic and was released on CD in 2004. Recently, Comstock wrote new big-band arrangements for Brian Setzer's Wolfgang's Big Night Out (2007) and Songs from Lonely Avenue (2009) CDs.

He started his arranging career in the dance bands of Sonny Dunham and Benny Carter, and with Les Brown from 1943 to 1955. When dance bands fell out of favor after World War II, Comstock and Doris Day left the Les Brown band. Comstock's backing arrangements for Doris Day's Warner Brothers screen tests impressed studio executives and resulted in a staff arranger position at Warner where he demonstrated his ability to write for large studio orchestras.

He died in 2013.

== Training and early years ==
Comstock had no formal training other than a few trombone lessons, and his junior high school music teacher helped him write his first arrangements for the school dance band. While still in high school, Comstock sold arrangements to local San Diego dance bands. After graduation, Comstock's high school friend, the late trumpeter Uan Rasey, landed a job touring with Sonny Dunham's nationally known dance band. Dunham hired Comstock on Uan's recommendation. When Sonny Dunham's band folded, Dunham's manager recommended Comstock to Benny Carter. Carter, a musician and arranger himself, soon delegated arrangement-related chores to Comstock.

== The Les Brown years ==
In 1943, Comstock's reputation led to an arranger position with Les Brown and His Band of Renown, which critics claimed was one of the key causes of the band's success. Comstock formally left the Brown band in 1947, but he continued to arrange for Les Brown until Brown's death in 2001.

Doris Day and Frank Comstock began a lifelong friendship while working together in Les Brown's band. Day spoke about Comstock in John Tumpak's book When Swing Was the Thing: Personality Profiles of the Big Band Era:

"From day one in Les Brown's band, Frank became my friend. Years and years have passed but Frank and I talk on the phone and laugh a lot. More often than not, we talk about the Les Brown days."

Day left Brown's band in 1946 to pursue a radio and recording career. A few months after settling in Hollywood, Day told Comstock of the rich opportunities in radio, movies, and television. Comstock soon left the Les Brown band to provide arrangements for Doris' first radio gigs: Your Hit Parade and The Rudy Vallee Show. Comstock's arrangements for Doris Day's Warner Brothers screen tests led to a staff arranger/orchestrator position at Warners.

== The Warner Brothers years ==
After joining the Warner Brothers staff in 1947 as a freelance arranger/orchestrator/conductor, Comstock quickly adapted his dance band experience to large orchestras. At first, he arranged individual dance numbers for musicals, but he soon began orchestrating and conducting music for major movies. At the peak of his movie career, Comstock had a major role in orchestrating the music for Calamity Jane, The Music Man, Finian's Rainbow, and other major Warner Brothers hits.

Unlike today's independently produced movies where on-screen credits are given to any and all participants, the sparse credits of "big-studio" films of the post-war period were usually limited to famous actors, music composers and studio executives. Even so, Comstock's work for Warner Brothers was notable enough to garner credits for many of his movies.

Gus Levine and Frank Comstock shared the orchestration work for The Music Man, Finian's Rainbow, and other major films. Early in the production of Finian's Rainbow, Levine took ill, leaving Comstock to orchestrate all but a few minor scenes. Even though Finian's Rainbow was nominated for a best-music Oscar, Comstock received no credit for his work.

The table below lists the movies that Comstock helped to arrange, orchestrate and/or conduct:

| Movie Title | Major Actors | Credits? |
|---|---|---|
| Starlift | Doris Day | No |
| I'll See You In My Dreams | Doris Day and Danny Thomas | No |
| On Moonlight Bay | Doris Day and Gordon MacRae | No |
| By the Light Of the Silvery Moon | Doris Day and Gordon MacRae | No |
| Room for One More | Cary Grant | No |
| She's Working Her Way Through College | Virginia Mayo | No |
| Where's Charlie? | Ray Bolger | No |
| The Will Rogers Story | Will Rogers Jr. | No |
| She's Back On Broadway | Virginia Mayo | No |
| The Desert Song | Gordon MacRae and Kathryn Grayson | No |
| Man With the Gun | Robert Mitchum | No |
| The Jazz Singer | Danny Thomas | No |
| The Eddie Cantor Story | Keefe Brasselle | Yes |
| So This Is Love | Kathryn Grayson and Merv Griffin | No |
| The Helen Morgan Story | Ann Blyth | Yes |
| Calamity Jane | Doris Day and Howard Keel | Yes |
| April In Paris | Doris Day and Ray Bolger | Yes |
| 3 Sailors and A Girl | Jane Powell and Merv Griffin | Yes |
| About Face | Gordon MacRae and Eddie Bracken | No |
| This Woman Is Dangerous | Joan Crawford | No |
| Lucky Me | Doris Day and Phil Silvers | Yes |
| Young At Heart | Doris Day and Frank Sinatra | No |
| The High and the Mighty | John Wayne | No |
| The Music Man | Robert Preston and Shirley Jones | Yes |
| Oh Dad, Poor Dad | Rosalind Russell | No |
| The Last of the Secret Agents | Marty Allen and Steve Rossi | Yes |
| The Swinger | Ann-Margret | No |
| The Family Jewels | Jerry Lewis | No |
| Some Like It Hot | Marilyn Monroe, Jack Lemmon and Tony Curtis | No |
| The Fortune Cookie | Jack Lemmon and Walter Matthau | No |
| Thoroughly Modern Millie | Julie Andrews | No |
| Valley of the Dolls | Patty Duke and Susan Hayward | No |
| Finian's Rainbow | Fred Astaire and Petula Clark | No |
| Hello, Dolly! (20th Century Fox) | Barbra Streisand and Walter Matthau | Yes |
| The Last Time I Saw Archie (Mark VII Productions) | Robert Mitchum and Jack Webb | Yes |

== Disney Theme Parks and animated features ==
Working as a freelance arranger for Disney Theme Park Music Director James Christensen, Comstock arranged some of the music heard to this day at Disney Theme Parks.

Comstock's work as arranger and orchestrator for Disney is listed below:

- The Disneyland Main Street Electrical Parade
- Tokyo Disneyland opening music
- Walt Disney World Family Concerts
- Disney Street Band - Medleys of Disney film music (all Disney parks)
- Christmas parades (all Disney parks)
- Walt Disney World Candlelight Services

Comstock's work for Disney also included several television specials and a new score for the Toot, Whistle, Plunk & Boom animated short.

For MPA Productions, Comstock scored four "Mr. Magoo" animated theatrical shorts, including Magoo Express.

== Television ==
The main theme and incidental music for Rocky and His Friends are Comstock's best-remembered compositions, but he also wrote compositions for many of the situation comedy and drama hits of the 1970s and 1980s. Comstock received a 1971 Emmy nomination for his Adam-12 TV score Elegy for a Pig.

Comstock's credits for television series as composer/conductor are listed below:

- Rocky and His Friends
- Adam-12 (all 112 episodes)
- Dragnet (1967, 4 seasons)
- Happy Days (4 seasons)
- Laverne and Shirley (4 seasons)
- Blansky's Beauties
- Ensign O'Toole
- McHale's Navy
- F-Troop
- Pete Kelly's Blues
- The D.A.'s Man
- Temple Houston
- The Lucy-Desi Comedy Hour

Comstock's arranging credits for television variety shows are listed below:

- The Bob Hope Show with Les Brown and His Band of Renown (15 years)
- The Steve Allen Show (2 years)
- The Judy Garland Show
- The Andy Williams Show
- The Carol Burnett Show
- The Jimmie Rodgers Show (Music Director)
- The Donald O'Connor and Mitzi Gaynor Special

== Recordings ==
Almost all of Comstock's recordings were originally released on vinyl LPs and singles. Most of them have been reissued on CD and can also be heard on music streaming services.

=== Dance band recordings ===
Owing to the Musicians Union recording ban of the period, only a handful of Comstock's Benny Carter and Stan Kenton arrangements were commercially recorded.

Les Brown and His Band of Renown recorded a large number of Comstock's arrangements throughout Les Brown's 50-year career. Comstock's arrangements comprise 17 of the 25 tracks on the Les Brown retrospective CD Best of the Capitol Years.

- "On The Alamo"
- "Perfidia"
- "Moonlight In Vermont"
- "Midnight Sun"
- "Lover"
- "Harlem Nocturne"
- "Tangerine"
- "Ridin' High"
- "Nina Never Knew"
- "Swingin' Down the Lane"
- "This Nearly Was Mine"
- "Invitation"
- "The Sweetheart of Sigma Chi"
- "Frenesi"
- "Just You, Just Me"
- "Leap Frog"
- "Goodnight Sweetheart"

=== Jazz and pop recordings ===
In 1954, Comstock arranged and conducted a dozen tracks recorded at the Jazz Laboratory recording studio in Los Angeles, which were released on Starlite Records as "Frank Comstock – Jazz Lab."

In 1957, Comstock and fellow arranger/conductor Warren Barker arranged and conducted a dozen melodies composed by Nelson Riddle based on military bugle calls, in an album released on Columbia Records as "Phil Silvers and Swinging Brass." In 1959, Comstock and Barker arranged and conducted an album of musical themes from television, released on Warner Bros. Records as "TV Guide Top Television Themes."

=== Orchestral recordings ===
Comstock's 1962 instrumental LP, Project Comstock: Music from Outer Space, has evolved into an exotica classic and was re-released on CD in 2004. Project Comstock features arrangements of standards and original Comstock compositions augmented with seldom-heard pre-synthesizer electronic instruments. Comstock's two Columbia instrumental albums - A Young Man's Fancy (Columbia 1021, 1954) and Patterns (Columbia 8003, 1955) - have also been reissued on CD.

Most of the music on the Finian's Rainbow soundtrack CD was arranged by Comstock as was the March of the Cards track on the Cincinnati Pops CD A Disney Spectacular. His original composition The Jade Express and his arrangement of Joanna are featured on Lionel Newman's Exciting Hong Kong LP (available on streaming and music download websites).

=== With the Hi-Lo's ===
Comstock arranged and conducted the first eight Hi-Lo's albums. The first four albums were released by Starlite Records, and have been compiled on a 2-CD re-release.

- Listen to the Hi-Lo's
- The Hi-Lo's On Hand
- The Hi-Lo's I Presume
- The Hi-Lo's Under Glass

The remainder of Comstock's Hi-Lo's albums were released by Columbia Records.

- Suddenly It's The Hi-Lo's
- Now Hear This
- Ring Around Rosie - The Hi-Lo's with Rosemary Clooney
- Love Nest

=== Backing arrangements for vocalists ===
Comstock arranged and conducted Frankie Laine's Torchin' and You Are My Love LPs (re-released on CD), many of Doris Day's backing arrangements on various releases, Rhonda Fleming's Rhonda LP (re-released on CD as Rhonda Fleming Sings Just for You), and Alan Copeland's No Sad Songs for Me LP. Comstock's arrangements also backed recordings and stage performances by Andy Williams, Rosemary Clooney, June Hutton, Herb Jeffries, Margaret Whiting, Connie Haines, Jo Ann Greer, Bob Hope, Steve Lawrence, The Norman Luboff Choir, The Ames Brothers, and other performers.

For their solo instrumental albums, the Comstock orchestra backed celeste-player Herm Saunders on his That Celestial Feeling LP and provided arrangements for Ted and Dick Nash for their Star Eyes - The Artistry of Ted Nash and The Brothers Nash LPs.

Three examples of Comstock's orchestral arrangements from movie soundtrack albums are Barbra Streisand's (Just Leave Everything to Me from Hello Dolly!), Doris Day's (A Woman's Touch from Calamity Jane), and Marilyn Monroe's (Running Wild from Some Like It Hot).

=== The Brian Setzer Orchestra ===
In 2007, Brian Setzer "rediscovered" Frank Comstock and commissioned new arrangements for his Wolfgang's Big Night Out and Songs from Lonely Avenue CDs.

== See also ==
- List of music arrangers
