= Loren Nerell =

American composer (1960–2026)

Loren Nerell (November 30, 1960 – July 2026) was an American composer and performer of ambient American music and Balinese gamelan.

As a composer, Loren wrote music for film, theater, dance, and interactive multi-media. He performed with the Kronos Quartet, recorded eleven albums of original work, appeared on several compilations such as Dali: The Endless Enigma, Soundscape Gallery 3, and Weightless, Effortless, and made guest appearances on recordings such as Steve Roach's Artifacts, Paul Haslinger's World Without Rules, Djam Karet's Collaborator, and L. Subramaniam's Global Fusion. He spent several months in Java and Bali studying native styles of gamelan music, some of which he has performed in the greater Los Angeles area with other gamelan enthusiasts.

== Life and career ==
Loren Nerell was born in Long Beach, California, on November 30, 1960. His early interest in electronic music began when he heard the Tangerine Dream album Rubycon. With it, he crossed over into a world of music that previously did not exist for him. He studied analog synthesis at Long Beach Community College eventually moving to San Diego State University where he was exposed to tape manipulation and tape composition techniques. He also began performing and studying Balinese gamelan music, and the microtonal composition of Harry Partch. From San Diego, Loren moved to California State University Dominguez Hills where he delved into computer synthesis, utilizing their Synclavier system.

After mastering the techniques he learned in school, he developed his own studio, stocking it with an array of vintage sound modules as well as the latest technology. He has worked in the music industry as a sound designer including a position at Oberheim Electronics, a synthesizer manufacturer, and as a recording engineer.

He received a Bachelor of Science degree in Anthropology and Geography from Cal Poly Pomona and a Master of Arts degree in ethnomusicology from UCLA. His thesis is on the ceremonial gamelan music of Bali called lelambatan. Loren worked in UCLA's Herb Alpert School of Music as a recording technician.

Nerell died in July 2026, at the age of 65.

== Discography ==
=== Solo albums ===
- Point of Arrival - Cassette (1986) reissued on vinyl (2011)
- Book of Alchemy - Cassette (1989)
- Lilin Dewa - CD (1996)
- Indonesian Soundscapes - CD (1999)
- The Venerable Dark Cloud - mini-CD (2000) reissued as a full-length CD (2016)
- Taksu - CD (2003)
- Slow Dream - CD (2012)
- Live at Soundquest Fest 2010 - download (2018)
- The Gong Prophet - CD (2021)

=== Collaboration albums ===
- Terraform - CD (2006) – with Steve Roach (reissued in 2009)
- Intangible - CD (2011) – with A Produce
- Tree Of Life - CD (2014) – with Mark Seelig
- Cave Dwellers - CD (2018) – with Mark Seelig

== See also ==
- List of ambient music artists
