= Ken Field =

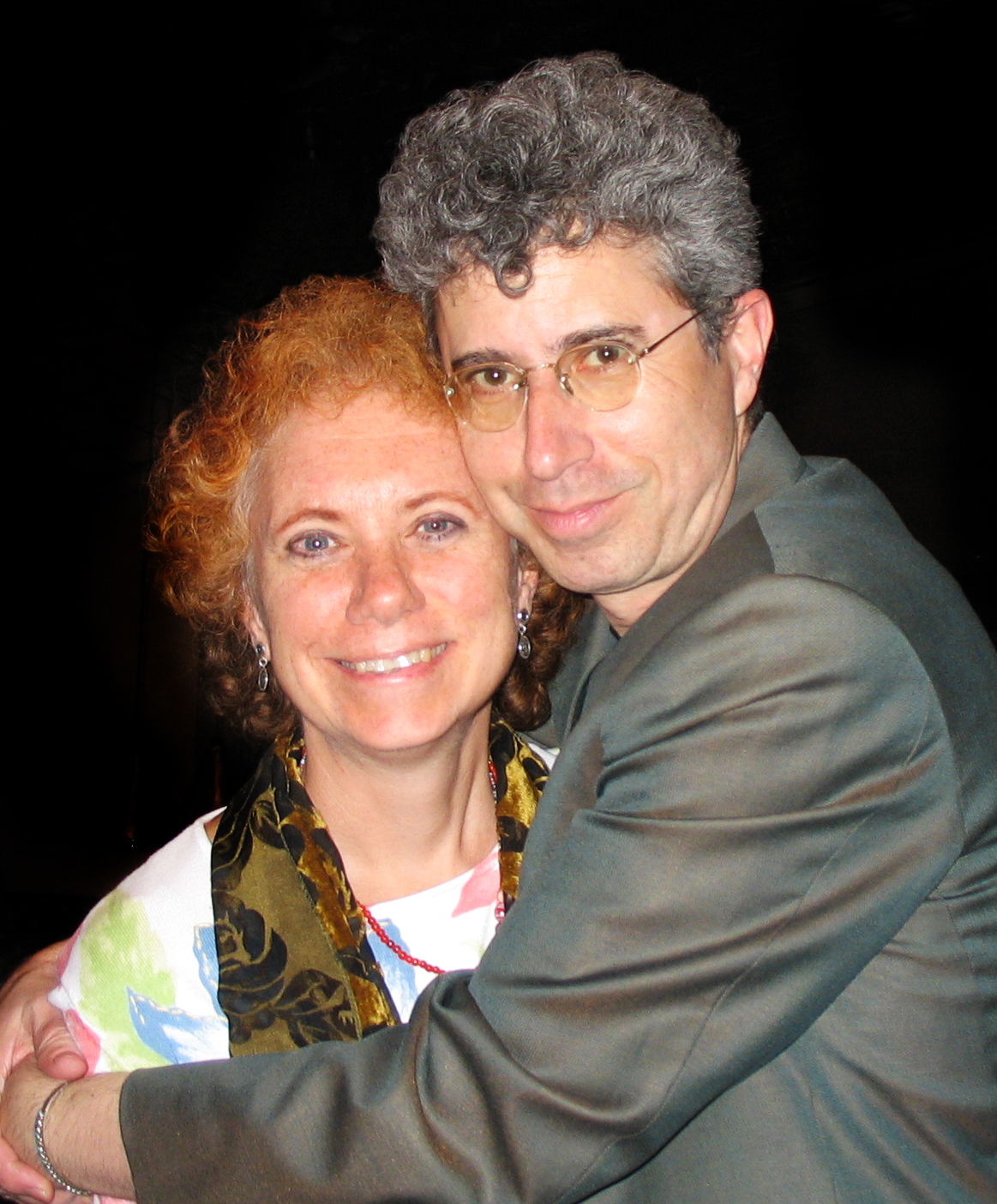
- Ken Field with his wife, filmmaker Karen Aqua.

Background information
- Born: January 26, 1953 (age 73)
- Genres: Jazz
- Instruments: Saxophone, flute, percussion
- Website: http://kenfield.org

Ken Field (born January 26, 1953) is a saxophonist, flautist, percussionist, and composer. Since 1988 he has been a member of the electrified modern music ensemble Birdsongs of the Mesozoic, with whom he has recorded eight CDs.

== Career ==
Field has been Composer-in-Residence at the Ucross Foundation, Wyoming, the Fundación Valparaíso, Spain, the MacDowell Colony, and the Atlantic Center for the Arts, Florida. He has performed for President Bill Clinton, and with former J. Geils frontman Peter Wolf. Ken Field is a Vandoren Performing Artist.

Field has also composed music for animation, film, and dance, including music for children's television program Sesame Street.

Field was named a Finalist in Music Composition by the Massachusetts Cultural Council in 2017.

=== Revolutionary Snake Ensemble ===
Field leads the Revolutionary Snake Ensemble, a New Orleans-inspired improvisational brass band. Their 2008 release Forked Tongue appeared on best-of-year lists in the Village Voice and the Estonian Postimees, as well as on lists in Georgia, Michigan, Ohio, Kansas, Wisconsin, and New York. Year of the Snake, the group's 2003 debut release, was included on best-of-year lists from WNYC Radio, the Gambit Weekly, and the Italian station Radio Popolare. The group has performed at the Brooklyn Academy of Music, the Museum of Fine Arts, Boston, the Puffin Cultural Forum, Berklee Performance Center, and numerous other venues, and has been nominated for a Boston Music Award, and several Boston Phoenix/WFNX Best Music Poll awards.

== Personal life ==
Field married the filmmaker Karen Aqua in 1984.

== Discography ==
- Subterranea (1996)
- Pictures of Motion (1999)
- Tokyo in F (2000)
- Year of the Snake (2003), Innova Recordings
- No Such Animal (2006), Innova Recordings
- Under the Skin (2006), Innova Recordings
- Forked Tongue (2008), Cuneiform Records
- Live Snakes, a live album (2014), Accurate Records
- I Want That Sound, (2016), Innova Recordings
- Iridescence, (2020), Ravello Records
- Transmitter, (2021), Neuma Recordings

== Other work ==
Field has undertaken residencies and conducted workshops at a number of US universities. He was formerly on the faculty of the Music Maker School, where he taught saxophone and flute. He also hosts The New Edge, a weekly radio program on WMBR in Cambridge, Massachusetts and WOMR in Provincetown, Massachusetts, and curated and co-directed Cultural Constructions, an intercultural music performance project. Field is Vice-President of the Board of Directors of Cambridge, MA based Tutoring Plus of Cambridge, President of the Board of Directors of JazzBoston, and a member of the Organizing Committee of the HONK! Festival of Activist Street Bands.

Field is Master of the Studio of Music Business, Composition, Performance, and Soundtrack Design with The Beijing DeTao Masters Academy (DTMA), a high-level, multi-disciplined, application-oriented higher education institution in Shanghai, China.
