= Martin Swope =

American musician

Martin Swope (born June 1, 1955) is an American musician and composer.

He was the tape manipulator and sound engineer for the Boston-based postpunk band Mission of Burma from 1979–1983, when they split up due to lead vocalist/guitarist Roger Miller's problem with the hearing disorder tinnitus. Swope's first role was as a tape loop engineer for Mission of Burma's live performances, but his role gradually evolved into live sound mixing as well. From his seat off stage at the mixing console, Swope used a reel to reel tape machine to record and manipulate sounds produced by the musicians onstage by speeding or slowing them, reversing them and/or creating tape loops. These techniques were inspired by composers like John Cage and Karlheinz Stockhausen who earlier led Miller (also a pianist) to write compositions for piano and tape loops. Swope would then re-introduce the manipulated tape effects into the public address system, essentially as fourth instrument. The tape effects ranged from recognizable as their original source, or distorted and manipulated beyond recognition; see the live album The Horrible Truth About Burma whose songs feature Swope's tape work perhaps most clearly among their discography. Drummer Peter Prescott was quoted as saying it was difficult to predict how Swope's tape effects would sound in live performances, "and that [random factor] got to be the really fun thing." Journalist Michael Azerrad later wrote: "A lot of people never knew about Swope's contribution and were mystified by how the musicians onstage could wring such amazing phantom sounds from their instruments." Though his contribution is widely considered an integral part of Burma's sound, Swope very rarely appeared onstage, only occasionally appearing to play second guitar during encores.

in 1981, Swope (on electric guitar) and Miller (on electric piano) joined the mostly instrumental, classical-rock group Birdsongs of the Mesozoic that later became their main musical project. Miller left Birdsongs after their first album but Swope stayed until 1993 contributing guitar, percussion, tape effects and compositions to three albums.

Swope declined to rejoin Mission of Burma when they reformed in 2002, and was replaced by Bob Weston of Shellac. Miller reported that Swope "dropped off the map" and moved to Hawaii.

== Discography ==
With Mission of Burma

- Signals, Calls and Marches (Ace of Hearts 1981)
- Vs. (Ace of Hearts 1982)
- The Horrible Truth About Burma (Ace of Hearts 1985)

With Birdsongs of the Mesozoic

- Birdsongs of the Mesozoic (Ace of Hearts, 1983)
- Magnetic Flip (Ace of Hearts, 1984)
- Beat of the Mesozoic (Ace of Hearts, 1986)
- Faultline (Cuneiform, 1989)
- Pyroclastics (Cuneiform, 1992)
