= Erik Lindgren =

American composer and pianist (born 1954)

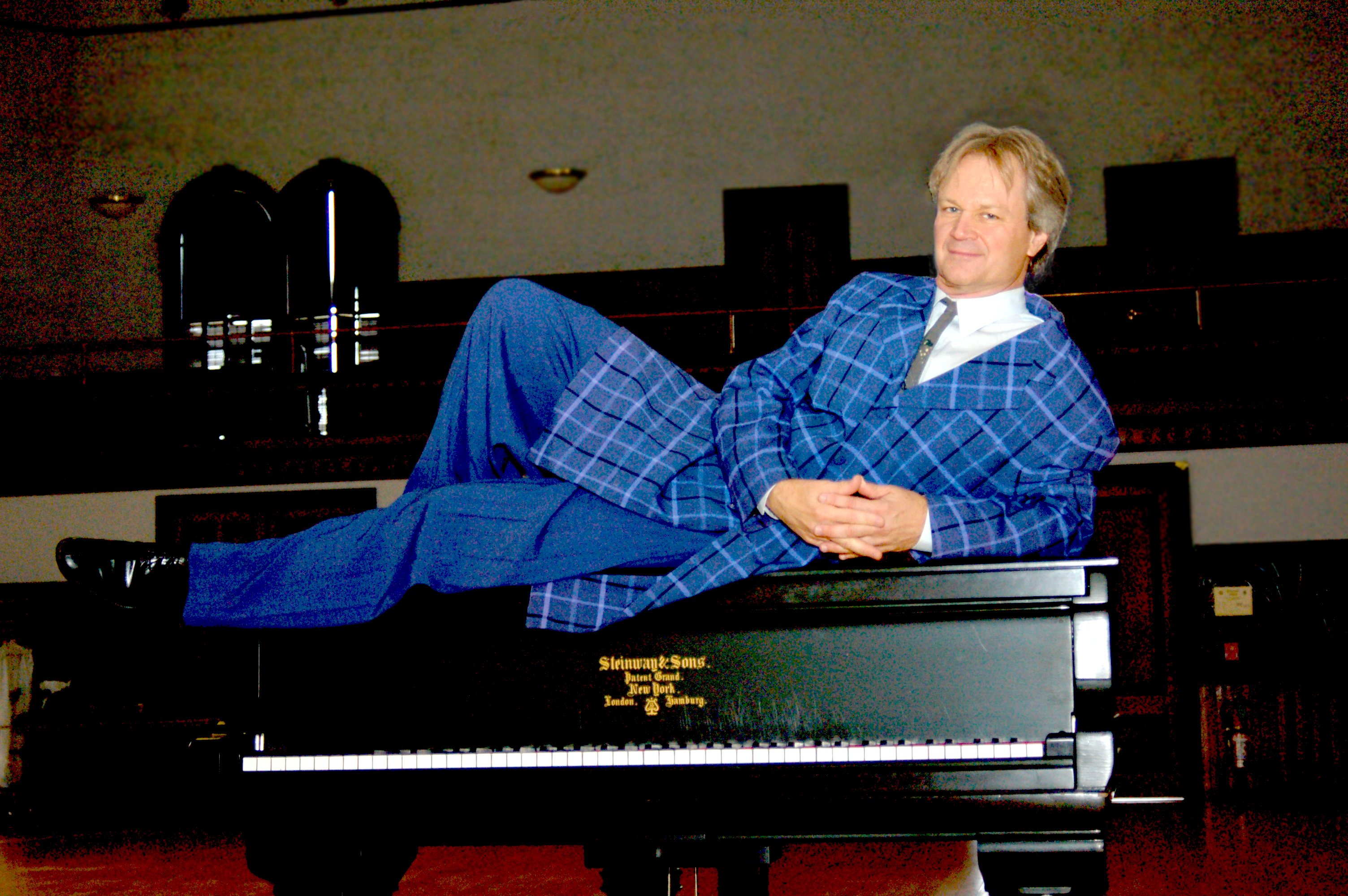

Erik Lindgren (December 15, 1954) is an American composer and pianist. He runs Arf! Arf! Records, and has led or been a member of several ensembles, such as The Space Negros and Birdsongs of the Mesozoic.

== Early life ==
Lindgren was born in Harrisburg, Pennsylvania in December 1954. He attended Northfield Mount Hermon School from 1969 to 1972, and received his Bachelor's in Music from Tufts University in 1976. In 1974–1975, he spent his junior year abroad in London studying at the Guildhall School of Music. Lindgren received a Master's in music composition and piano performance from the University of Iowa in 1977.

== Career ==
Lindgren owns Foot Foot Music BMI, which publishes all of his compositions. In 1978, Lindgren established Sounds Interesting Productions, a commercial recording studio and music production company based in Cambridge, MA. In 1998, he relocated his facility to Middleborough, MA. Lindgren made The Well-Tempered Music Library, which consists of seven CDs of stock commercial music that he composed and produced.

Lindgren was a founding member of Birdsongs of the Mesozoic.

As a celebration of his 50th birthday on June 4, 2005, Lindgren performed original works live with various ensembles at the Longy School of Music.

In 2012, Lindgren received a commission from the Georgia Symphony Orchestra to compose "Extreme Spirituals," a 6-movement work.

Lindgren has been on the board of the Brockton Symphony since 2009, and the Plymouth Center for the Arts since 2018.
