= Cuneiform Records =

American record label

- Founded: 1984
- Founder: Steven Feigenbaum
- Genre: Jazz, jazz rock, progressive rock
- Country of origin: U.S.
- Location: Silver Spring, Maryland
- Official website: cuneiformrecords.com

Cuneiform Records is a record label in Silver Spring, Maryland.

Founded in 1984, the label releases a mixture of musical styles, all with a Rock in Opposition aesthetic, including progressive jazz, jazz fusion, the Canterbury scene, and electronic music. Cuneiform has introduced many notable acts but also documents older bands who fit the profile, including its release of the Heldon catalog and several archival Soft Machine recordings. The label operates with a mail-order retailer, Wayside Music.

In 2018, founder Steve Feigenbaum announced that the label would not release any new music that year. Nevertheless, 2019 saw the arrival of several new albums on the Cuneiform label.
