= Thurston Moore discography =

Thurston Moore solo discography
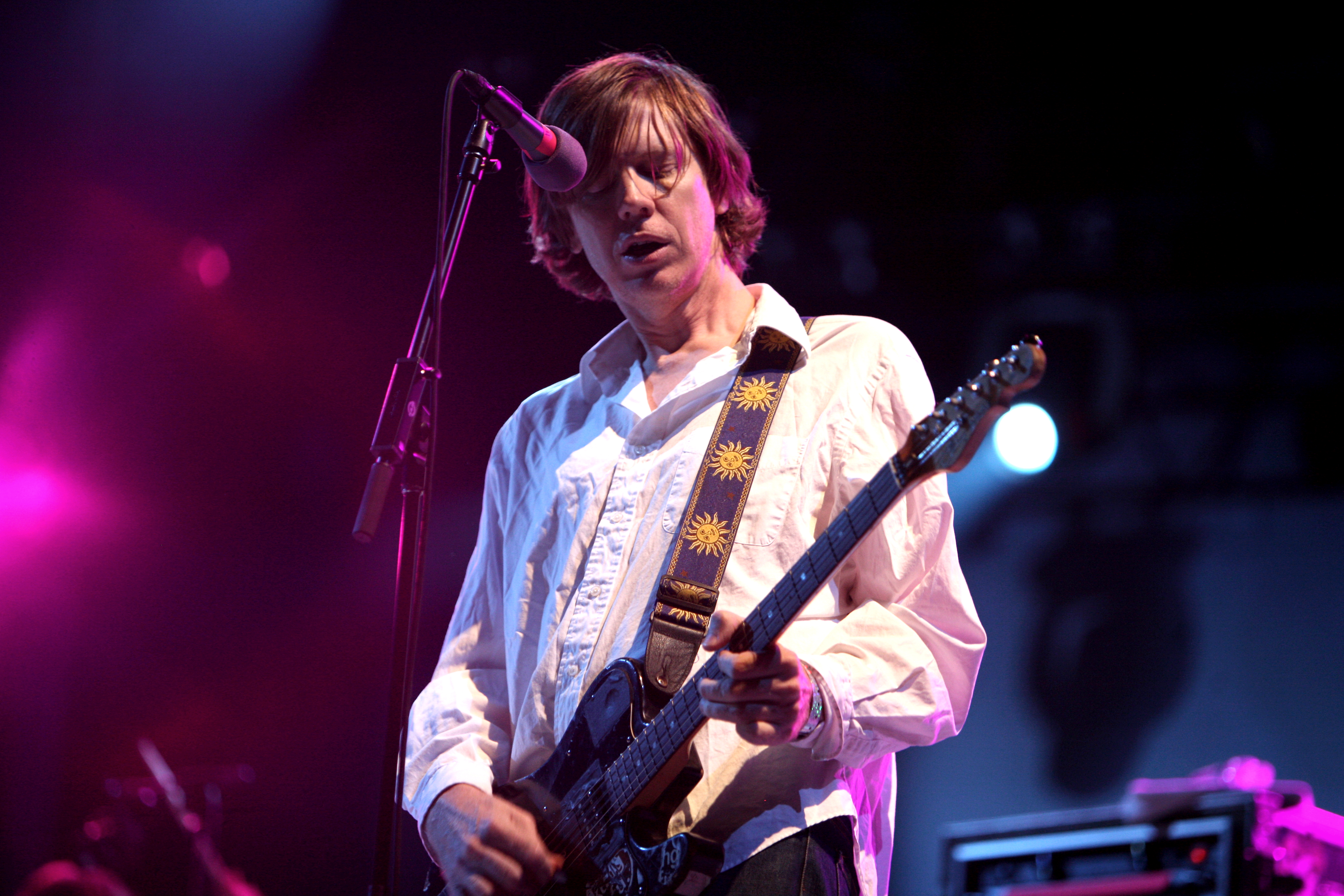
- Moore with Sonic Youth at La Route du Rock, 2007
- Studio albums: 16
- EPs: 7
- Demo albums: 1
- Live albums: 2
- Remix albums: 1
- Remix EPs: 1
- Singles: 27
- Film scores: 4
- Split albums: 6
- Split singles: 7
- Compilation appearances: 7

The solo discography of Thurston Moore consists of 16 studio albums, seven extended plays, two live albums, one remix album, one remix EP, 27 singles (official and promotional), four film scores, six split albums, seven split singles, and seven original compilation appearances. In addition to his time as a member of various bands, most notably Sonic Youth, Moore has collaborated with an extensive number of artists, from fellow former members of Sonic Youth to musical artists such as Beck, Yoko Ono, and John Zorn. In 2017, an oral discography entitled Thurston Moore: We Sing a New language was published, cataloging his lesser-known solo and collaborative works up to that point.

Since Sonic Youth's dissolution in 2011, Moore's career has remained active, often releasing his solo material with a backing lineup of Steve Shelley (Sonic Youth), Debbie Googe (My Bloody Valentine) and James Sedwards. His most recent solo studio album, Flow Critical Lucidity, was released in 2024.

== Solo ==
=== Studio albums ===
List of studio albums with relevant details
Album	Release details	Peak chart positions									Ref.
Album	Release details	BEL (Fl)	BEL (Wa)	FRA	GER	NETH	NOR	SCOT	UK	UK Indie	Ref.
Psychic Hearts	Released: May 9, 1995; Labels: DGC, Geffen	—	—	—	—	—	—	—	—	—	
Piece for Yvonne Rainer	Released: 1996; Label: Destroy All Music	—	—	—	—	—	—	—	—	—	
Please Just Leave Me (My Paul Desmond) (50 copies)	Released: 1996; Label: Pure	—	—	—	—	—	—	—	—	—	
Black Weeds/White Death (200 copies)	Released: 2007; Label: Meudiademorte	—	—	—	—	—	—	—	—	—	
Trees Outside the Academy	Released: September 18, 2007; Label: Ecstatic Peace!	47	—	176	—	—	18	—	—	24	
Built for Lovin'	Released: 2008; Label: Lost Treasures of the Underworld	—	—	—	—	—	—	—	—	—	
Sensitive/Lethal	Released: April 2008; Label: No Fun	—	—	—	—	—	—	—	—	—	
12 String Meditations for Jack Rose	Released: 2011; Label: Vin du Select Qualitite	—	—	—	—	—	—	—	—	—	
Demolished Thoughts	Released: May 24, 2011; Label: Matador	28	72	—	—	—	8	—	119	14	
The Best Day	Released: October 20, 2014; Label: Matador	27	55	123	—	—	—	92	78	16	
Rock n Roll Consciousness	Released: April 28, 2017; Labels: Fiction, Caroline International	23	52	167	66	151	—	39	65	—	
Spirit Counsel (Note: Spirit Counsel, a triple album, consists of two studio tracks and one live performance.)	Released: September 21, 2019; Label: The Daydream Library Series	—	—	—	—	—	—	—	—	45	
By the Fire	Released: September 25, 2020; Label: The Daydream Library Series	86	—	—	—	—	—	49	—	10	
Screen Time	Released: February 5, 2021; Label: Self-released	—	—	—	—	—	—	—	—	—	
An Electric Noise Guitar Tribute to Peter Rehberg	Released: August 6, 2021; Label: Self-released	—	—	—	—	—	—	—	—	—	
Flow Critical Lucidity	Released: September 20, 2024; Label: The Daydream Library Series	—	—	—	—	—	—	46	—	12	
"—" denotes a recording that did not chart or was not released in that territory.

=== Extended plays ===
List of extended plays with relevant details
EP	Release details	Ref.
Flipped Out Bride	Released: 2006; Label: Blossoming Noise	
Free / Love (90 copies)	Released: 2007; Label: Throne Heap	
Blindfold	Released: 2008; Label: Destructive Industries	
Suicide Notes for Acoustic Guitar	Released: 2010; Label: Carbon	
Voice Studies 05 (100 copies)	Released: 2011; Label: My Dance the Skull	
Sun Gift Earth	Released: November 14, 2014; Label: Blank Editions	
Offerings	Released: 2016; Label: not on label	

=== Live albums ===
List of live albums with relevant details
Album	Release details	Peak chart positions	Ref.
Album	Release details	UK Indie	Ref.
Sonic Street Chicago (live accompaniment to a screening of the film Street by Jamie Nares at the Art Institute of Chicago)	Released: 2014; Label: Corbet Vs. Dempsey	—	
Spirit Counsel (live portion recorded at The Barbican)	Released: September 21, 2019; Label: The Daydream Library Series	45	
"—" denotes a recording that did not chart or was not released in that territory.

=== Demo albums ===
- Guitar Explorations of Cloud Formations (February 6, 2026, self-released)

=== Remix albums ===
- Root (1998, Lo)

=== Remix EPs ===
- Kapotte Music by Thurston Moore (2004, minimax CD, Korm Plastics)

=== Singles ===
List of official and promotional singles with relevant details
Year	Title	Peak chart positions	Album	Ref.
Year	Title	UK Phys.	Album	Ref.
1994	"Starfield Wild" b/w "Earth/Amp"	—	Non-album single	
1995	"Cindy (Rotten Tanx)"	—	Psychic Hearts	
1995	"Ono Soul"	—	Psychic Hearts	
2011	"Benediction"	—	Demolished Thoughts	
2014	"Detonation" b/w "Germs Burn"	—	The Best Day	
2014	"Heavenmetal"	—	Chelsea Light Moving	
2014	"Speak to the Wild"	—	The Best Day	
2016	"Chelsea's Kiss"	—	Non-album single	
2017	"Cease Fire"	—	Rock n Roll Consciousness (Japanese bonus track)	
2017	"Smoke of Dreams"	—	Rock n Roll Consciousness	
2018	"Mx Liberty"	15	Rock n Roll Consciousness (Japanese bonus track)	
2019	"Pollination" b/w "Leave Me Alone" (New Order cover)	12	Non-album singles	
2019	"Spring Swells" b/w "Leave Me Alone" (New Order cover)	16	Non-album singles	
2019	"Three Graces: Alice Moki Jayne" b/w "Leave Me Alone" (New Order cover)	13	Non-album singles	
2020	"May Daze"	—	Non-album singles	
2020	"Hashish"	4	By the Fire	
2020	"Another Day" (Galaxie 500 cover)	—	Non-album single	
2020	"Siren"	—	By the Fire	
2021	"Sketch of Light"	—	Non-album single	
2023	"Hypnogram"	—	Flow Critical Lucidity	
2023	"Isadora"	—	Flow Critical Lucidity (Bandcamp digital bonus track)	
2024	"Rewilding"	—	Flow Critical Lucidity	
2024	"San Limites"	—	Flow Critical Lucidity	
2024	"New in Town"	—	Flow Critical Lucidity	
2024	"The Diver"	—	Flow Critical Lucidity	
2025	"The Serpentine"	—	Non-album singles	
2025	"Temptation Inside Your Heart" (The Velvet Underground cover)	—	Non-album singles	
"—" denotes a recording that did not chart or was not released in that territory.

=== Film scores ===
- Heavy (dir. James Mangold) (1995)
- Extra Action (and Extra Hardcore) (dir. Richard Kern) (March 18, 2008)
- Street (dir. Jamie Nares) (2011)
- Extra Shot (dir. Richard Kern) (2013)

=== Split albums ===
- Thurston Moore / Golden Calves Century Band / Dr. Gretchen Musical Weightlifting Program (1999, Polyamory)
- From the Earth to the Spheres Vol. 1 (split with My Cat Is an Alien) (2004, Opax)
- Thurston Moore / Cotton Museum (2007, 500 copies, Tasty Soil)
- Mature, Lonely + Out of Control / Alternative Hair Styles (split with Graham Moore) (2008, Nihilist)
- Kommissar Hjuler und Mama Baer / Thurston Moore (split with Kommissar Hjuler and Mama Baer) (2009, Goaty Tapes)
- Untitled (split with Kylie Minoise, Tusco Terror, and Wether) (2009, Insult)

=== Split singles ===
- "Just Tell Her That I Really Like Her" (from "Instress Vol. 2", split with Loren Mazzacane Connors) (1995, Road Cone)
- "Jong" (Moore) / "New Wave Dust" (John Wiese) (2004, Troniks)
- "Female Body Inspector (Moore) / "Monster Tape" (Monster Dudes) (2006, Deathbomb Arc)
- "12 String Acoustik Regret", "12 String Acoustik Suicide Pact with God" (Moore) / "Of Death" (Graviton) (2010, Wintage Records & Tapes)
- "Boogie X", "Hot Date", "Boogie Y" (Moore) / "Gold Dime" (Talk Normal) (2011, Fast Weapons)
- "Gleo" (from "Cause & Effect Vol. 1", split with Lou Barlow, Dumb Numbers, Talk Normal, David Yow, and Child Bite) (2013, triple single, Joyful Noise)
- "Velvet Hell" (from "Split", split with Black Leather Jesus) (2022, Summer Interlude)

=== Compilation appearances ===
- Just Another Asshole – "Fucking Youth of Today" (1981, not on label)
- Our Band Could Be Your Life: A Tribute to D Boon and the Minutemen – "Shit You Hear at Parties" (Minutemen cover) (1994, Little Brother)
- Heavy (Original Motion Picture Soundtrack) – "Victor and Callie", "Undertow", "Kissing on the Bridge", "Spinning Goodbye", and "Culinary Institute" (1996, TVT)
- Moonlanding Vol. 1–2 – "Mouse" (2000, Helicopter)
- 45′18″ – 4′33″ (spliced recording from Society's Ills inserted into 4′33″ by John Cage) (2002, Korm Plastics)
- Thrash Sabbatical – "Unzipped", "Petite Bone", and "Creamsikkle" (2007, Deathbomb Arc)
- Oh Michael Look What You've Done: Friends Play Michael Chapman – "It Didn't Work Out" (Michael Chapman cover) (2014, Tompkins Square)

== Collaborations ==
Thurston Moore collaborative discography
- Studio albums: 23
- EPs: 2
- Live albums: 33
- Live EPs: 2
- Singles: 5
- Split EPs: 1
- Split singles: 2
- Compilation appearances: 3

The collaborative discography of Thurston Moore consists of 23 studio albums, two extended plays, 33 live albums, two live EPs, 5 singles (official and promotional), one split EP, two split singles, and three original compilation appearances.

=== Studio albums ===
List of collaborative albums
Album	Release details	Ref.
Barefoot in the Head (with Don Dietrich and Jim Sauter)	Released: 1990 (rec. 1988); Label: Forced Exposure	
Shamballa: Duets with Thurston Moore and Elliott Sharp (with William Hooker and Elliott Sharp)	Released: 1994; Label: Knitting Factory Works	
Legend of the Blood Yeti (with Thirteen Ghosts and Derek Bailey)	Released: 1997; Label: Infinite Chug	
MMMR (with Loren Mazzacane Connors, Jean-Marc Montera, and Lee Ranaldo)	Released: 1997; Labels: Numero Zero, Xeric	
Pillow Wand (with Nels Cline)	Released: 1997; Label: Little Brother	
The Promise (with Evan Parker and Walter Prati)	Released: 1999; Label: Materiali Sonori	
New York – Ystad (with Lee Ranaldo, Steve Shelley, and Mats Gustafsson)	Released: 2000; Label: Olof Bright	
TM/MF (with Marco Fusinato)	Released: 2000; Label: Freewaysound	
Make No Mistake About It (with David Nyoukis and Carlos Giffoni)	Released: 2004; Label: Gold Soundz	
The Roadhouse Session Vol. 1 (with Chris Corsano, Paul Flaherty, and Wally Shoup)	Released: 2007 (rec. 2002); Label: Columbia Music Entertainment	
Untitled (with Paul Flaherty and Bill Nace)	Released: 2007; Label: Ecstatic Peace!	
Live (with Zac Davis)	Released: 2008; Label: Maim & Disfigure	
Les Anges Du Péché (with Jean-Marc Montera and Lee Ranaldo)	Released: 2011; Label: Dysmusie	
Yokokimthurston (with Yoko Ono and Kim Gordon)	Released: September 25, 2012; Label: Chimera Music	
@ (with John Zorn)	Released: 2013; Label: Tzadik	
Comes Through in the Call Hold (with Clark Coolidge and Anne Waldman)	Released: 2013; Label: Fast Speaking Music	
Oasis at Biskra (with Anne Waldman, Daniel Carter, Ambrose Bye, and Devin Brahja Waldman)	Released: 2014; Label: Fast Speaking Music	
Cuts of Guilt, Cuts Deeper (with Merzbow, Mats Gustafsson, and Balázs Pándi)	Released: March 24, 2015; Label: RareNoise	
Tiny People Having a Meeting (with Clark Coolidge and Anne Waldman)	Released: 2015; Label: Fast Speaking Music	
Disarm (with Adam Gołębiewski)	Released: 2017; Label: Endless Happiness	
Improvisations (with Charles Hayward)	Released: December 8, 2017; Label: Care in the Community	
Dunia (with Umut Çağlar)	Released: 2018; Label: Astral Spirits	
They Came Like Swallows – Seven Requiems for the Children of Gaza (with Bonner Kramer)	Released: May 1, 2026; Label: Silver Current	

=== Extended plays ===
- The Crumb (with Lydia Lunch) (1988, Widowspeak)
- 3 New Songs (with Richard Hell and Don Fleming) (February 1992, Overground)

=== Live albums ===
List of live collaborative albums
Album	Release details	Ref.
Klangfarbenmelodie.. and the Colorist Strikes Primitiv (with Tom Surgal at The Cooler)	Released: 1995; Label: Corpus Hermeticum	
Piece for Jetsun Dolma (with Tom Surgal and William Winant at Festival International de Musique Actuelle de Victoriaville)	Released: 1996; Label: Les Disques Victo	
In Store (with Nels Cline at Rhino Records)	Released: 1997; Label: Father Yod	
Songs We Taught the Lord Vol. 2 (with Phil X. Milstein in Massachusetts)	Released: 1997; Label: Hot Cars Warp	
Hurricane Floyd (with Toshi Makihara and Wally Shoup in Boston)	Released: 1999; Label: Sublingual	
Fuck Shit Up (with Christian Marclay and Lee Ranaldo at Festival International de Musique Actuelle de Victoriaville)	Released: 2000; Label: Les Disques Victo	
Kill Any / All Spin Personnel (with Beck and Tom Surgal at The Cooler)	Released: 2000; Label: Freedom From	
Lost to the City / Noise to Nowhere (with Tom Surgal and William Winant at Taktlos Festival)	Released: 2000; Label: Intakt	
Live at Easthampton Town Hall (with Zeena Parkins and Nels Cline)	Released: 2001; Label: JMZ	
Opus: Three Incredible Ideas (with Walter Prati and Giancarlo Schiaffini in Italy)	Released: 2001; Label: Auditorium Edizioni	
Live at Tonic (with Wally Shoup, Paul Flaherty, and Chris Corsano)	Released: 2003; Label: Leo	
D.D.T. (with Aaron Dilloway and Charlie Draheim in Detroit)	Released: 2006; Label: Tuskie Skull	
Kumpiny Night (with Elisa Ambrogio, Ben Chasny, Zac Davis, Dredd Foole, Kim Gordon, Gown, Matt Krefting, Bill Nace, and Jessi Swenson)	Released: 2007; Label: not on label	
Four Guitars Live (with Lee Ranaldo, Carlos Giffoni, and Nels Cline at Luxx)	Released: 2006 (rec. 2001); Label: Important	
Keffer Gordon Moore (with Leslie Keffer and Kim Gordon)	Released: 2008; Label: Ecstatic Peace!	
Senso (with White Out and Jim O'Rourke at Tonic)	Released: September 22, 2009; Label: Ecstatic Peace!	
Mother/Groundhog (with Chris Corsano, Mats Gustafsson, and Bill Nace at The Middle East)	Released: 2010; Labels: Ecstatic Peace!, Open Mouth	
Play Some Fucking Stooges (with Mats Gustafsson in the U.S.)	Released: 2012; Label: Quasi Pop	
Last Notes (with Joe McPhee and Bill Nace at Roulette)	Released: 2013; Label: Open Mouth	
The Only Way to Go Is Straight Through (with Loren Connors at The Stone)	Released: 2013; Label: Northern Spy	
Vi Är Alla Guds Slavar (with Mats Gustafsson at Cafe Oto)	Released: 2013; Label: Otoroku	
Live at ZDB (with Gabriel Ferrandini and Pedro Sousa at Galeria Zé dos Bois)	Released: 2014; Label: Shhpuma	
The Rust Within Their Throats (with Margarida Garcia at Galeria Zé dos Bois)	Released: 2014; Label: Headlights	
Soft Machine Sutra (with Anne Waldman, Gene Moore, Tom Surgal, and Samara Lubelski at The Stone)	Released: 2014; Label: Fast Speaking Music	
The Thing with Thurston Moore Live (with the Thing at Cafe Oto)	Released: December 9, 2014; Label: The Thing	
Live at Henie Onstad Kunstsenter (with Mats Gustafsson at Henie Onstad Kunstsenter)	Released: 2015; Label: Prisma	
Live at White Cube (with Christian Marclay and London Sinfonietta at White Cube)	Released: 2015; Label: The Vinyl Factory	
Songs We Taught the Lord Vol. 1 (with Phil X. Milstein in Massachusetts)	Released: 2015 (rec. 1996); Label: not on label	
Untitled (with Jooklo Duo and Dylan Nyoukis in Brighton)	Released: 2015; Label: Chocolate Monk	
Marshmallow Moon Decorum (with Frank Rosaly)	Released: 2016; Label: Corbett Vs. Dempsey	
Cuts Up, Cuts Out (with Merzbow, Mats Gustafsson, and Balázs Pándi)	Released: April 21, 2018 (RSD); Label: RareNoise	
Live at The Stone (with Samara Lubelski and Bill Nace at The Stone)	Released: 2023; Label: Daksina	
Iguana (with Carlos Giffoni at Sweat Records)	Released: 2026 (rec. 2024); Label: Ideal	

=== Live EPs ===
- Not Me (with Tom Surgal at The Middle East) (1996, Fourth Dimension)
- Live at Cafe Oto (with Alex Ward at Cafe Oto) (2013, Otoroku)

=== Singles ===
- "Electricity Vs. Insects" (with Prick Decay) (1996, Chocolate Monk)
- "G. Neurus", "Super Tuscan – Deisonic Rmx: Solo un Minuto" / "Super Tuscan" (with Deison) (1999, Loud!/Sin Organisation)
- "Tribute to Martin Luther King Jr." (with Moz) (2003, CD single, Breathmint)
- "Early in the Morning" (with Yoko Ono and Kim Gordon) (June 5, 2012, Chimera Music)
- "Feel It in Your Guts" (with Bernie Sanders) (2016, Joyful Noise)

=== Split EPs ===
- The Voloptulist – "Corion Sound for TNB" (with the New Blockaders) / "840 Seconds Over" (Jim O'Rourke and the New Blockaders with Chris Corsano) (2007, Hospital Productions)

=== Split singles ===
- "Telstar" (with Don Fleming) / "Sputnik" (Experimental Audio Research) (May 1997, Via Satellite)
- "Western Mass Hardcore Rules OK" (live with Paul Flaherty at the Flywheel) / Untitled (Slither) (2008, Not Not Fun)

=== Compilation appearances ===
- Kerouac: Kicks Joy Darkness – "The Last Hotel" (with Patti Smith and Lenny Kaye) (1997, Rykodisc)
- Black Box – box set including the album New York – Ystad (with Lee Ranaldo, Steve Shelley, and Mats Gustafsson) (2000, Olof Bright)
- Allen Ginsberg's The Fall of America: A 50th Anniversary Musical Tribute – "Hum Bom!" (with Lee Ranaldo) (2021, not on label)

== Contributions ==
=== Albums ===
List of album contributions
Album	Artist	Release details	Role	Ref.
Symphony No. 1 (Tonal Plexus)	Glenn Branca	Released: 1983; Label: ROIR		
Symphony No. 3 (Gloria)	Glenn Branca	Released: 1983; Label: Neutral		
Honeymoon in Red	Lydia Lunch	Released: 1987; Label: Widowspeak	Guitar	
Joggers and Smoggers	The Ex	Released: 1989; Label: The Ex	Musician on "Gentlemen"	
Special Kiss	Gumball	Released: 1991; Label: Paperhouse		
Symphony No. 2 (The Peak of the Sacred)	Glenn Branca	Released: 1992 (rec. 1982); Label: Atavistic		
Ball-Hog or Tugboat?	Mike Watt	Released: February 28, 1995; Label: Columbia		
Milktrain to Paydirt	Trumans Water	Released: 1995; Label: Homestead	Guitar on "Asleep Sneeze"	
Riddim Warfare	DJ Spooky	Released: 1998; Label: Outpost	Guitar on "Dialectical Transformation III (Soylent Green)"	
III	The Grassy Knoll	Released: 1999; Label: Antilles	Guitar on "Every Third Thought", "112 Greene Street", and "Thunder Ain't Rain"	
Pearl + Umbra	Russell Mills / Undark	Released: 1999; Label: Bella Union	On "Causes Causes Causes"	
No Music Festival	Various	Released: 2000; Label: Entartete Kunst	Live guitar improvisations	
G2, 44+/x2	Phill Niblock	Released: 2002; Label: Moikai	E-bow guitar improvisation on the second version of "Guitar Two, for Four"	
The Good, the Bad & the Ugly	Sonny Vincent	Released: 2003; Label: Munster	Featured guitarist on "South Beach"	
Future Noir	Hanin Elias	Released: 2004; Label: Fatal	Guitar on "In My Room"	
AM500 (CD box set)	Various	Released: 2007; Label: American Tapes	Jamming with members of Graveyards and Hair Police on the CDs "Noh Neighbors" and "Noise Complaint"	
Touch the Iceberg	Owl Xounds Exploding Galaxy	Released: 2007; Label: Fuck It Tapes	Guitar	
Guitar Trio Is My Life!	Rhys Chatham and His Guitar Trio All Stars	Released: 2008; Label: Radium	Guitar	
Maison Hantée	Alexandre Pierrepont and Mike Ladd	Released: 2008; Label: Rogueart	On "Chamber 20"	
Now and Forever (box set)	The Thing	Released: 2008; Label: Smalltown Superjazzz	Recording from a performance at Øyafestivalen	
The Secret Song	DJ Spooky	Released: 2009; Label: Thirsty Ear	Featured with Mike Ladd on "Known Unknowns"	
Ticket for Decay	Hat City Intuitive	Released: 2010; Label: Ecstatic Peace!		
The Tingle of Casual Danger (live)	Sunburned Hand of the Man	Released: 2012; Label: Manhand		
Axels & Sockets (The Jeffrey Lee Pierce Sessions Project)	Various	Released: 2014; Label: Glitterhouse	Guitar on "Nobody's City" and "Shame and Pain"	
The Polar Bear	Michael Chapman	Released: 2014; Label: Blast First Petite	Guitar on "Six, Two, Thirteen"	
Transient	Krieg	Released: 2015; Label: Init	Spoken word on "Home"	
With... (live at Cafe Oto)	John Russell	Released: 2015; Label: Emanem	Guitar on "Second Half of the Second Half"	

=== Extended plays ===
List of EP contributions
EP	Artist	Release details	Role	Ref.
In Limbo	Lydia Lunch	Released: 1984; Label: Doublevision		
Subliminal Minded: The EP	DJ Spooky	Released: 1999; Label: Outpost	Featured on "Dialectical Transformation III Peace in Rwanda Mix"	

=== Singles ===
List of single contributions
Single	Artist	Release details	Role	Ref.
"Leaving" b/w "One Night Stand"	Even Worse	Released: 1988 (rec. 1982); Label: Autonomy	Writing and guitar on "One Night Stand"	
"Crush with Eyeliner"	R.E.M.	Released: 1994; Label: Warner Bros.	Background vocals	

=== Remixes ===
- Rising Mixes – "Rising" by Yoko Ono / IMA (1996)
- Bustin' + Dronin' – "Essex Dogs" by Blur (1998)
- Kapotte Music by Thurston Moore (2004, minimax CD, Korm Plastics)
- "Celestica" by Crystal Castles (June 2, 2010)
- L'homme à la Caméra: Remixes – "7/11" by Un Drame Musical Instantané (2017, EP)

=== Other contributions ===
- "The Weight" by Joseph Coward (2016)

== Production credits ==
- The Blue Humans featuring Rudolph Grey – Clear to Higher Time (1992, New Alliance)
