= Spirit Counsel =

Studio album / live album by Thurston Moore
- Released: September 21, 2019
- Recorded: April 14, 2018; 2019
- Venue: The Barbican, London
- Studio: Les Ateliers Claus, Brussels; Wilton Way, London
- Genre: Avant-garde; rock
- Length: 2:28:43
- Label: The Daydream Library Series
- Producer: Eva Prinz

Thurston Moore chronology
Improvisations (2017)	Spirit Counsel (2019)	By the Fire (2020)

Spirit Counsel is an album by American musician Thurston Moore. A triple album, it was released on September 21, 2019, through Moore and Eva Prinz's record label the Daydream Library Series. It was produced by Prinz and consists of three long instrumental pieces that incorporate elements from Moore's past avant-garde work with his more rock-oriented output. Spirit Counsel simultaneously serves as both Moore's 12th studio and second live album because the third piece is a recording of a live performance.

== Recording and composition ==
Following Moore's relatively straightforward rock album Rock n Roll Consciousness (2017), Spirit Counsel in part contains rock music elements but often has more in common with Moore's avant-garde output that he had historically released on small independent labels. The album consists of three long instrumental compositions that pay homage to figures who had influenced him throughout his life, and altogether, they make for a total runtime of roughly two and a half hours.

Opener "Alice Moki Jayne" was recorded in 2019 at Les Ateliers Claus, Brussels and was named after Alice Coltrane, Moki Cherry, and Jayne Cortez. An hour-long track, it is one of the album's more rock-oriented compositions, and it features regular collaborators Debbie Googe on bass and James Sedwards on guitar, and is augmented by Jon Leidecker on electronics, Jen Chochinov on guitar, and Jem Doulton on drums.

The second, "8 Spring Street", is a solo guitar composition that pays tribute to Moore's former mentor Glenn Branca. The title is in reference to a Manhattan apartment where Branca once lived in the 1980s. Recorded in 2019 at Wiltoy Way, London, at 29 minutes long, it is the album's shortest track.

The final piece on Spirit Counsel, "Galaxies", is a nearly hour-long recording of a performance at the Barbican Theatre in London where Moore and eleven other musicians played together on 12-string electric guitars. The event, which took place on April 14, 2018, had been billed as "Galaxies: 12x12" and included Moore, Googe, Sedwards, and Chochinov, in addition to Alex Ward, David Toop, Eugene Coyne, James McCartney, Jonah Falco, Joseph Coward, Rachel Aggs, and Susan Stenger. Prior to the performance, Moore had met everyone except Chochinov and Coyne. He attributed inspiration for the event on the Sun Ra poem "The Satellites Are Spinning".

== Release ==
Spirit Counsel was released on September 21, 2019, coinciding with International Peace Day and marking Moore's first new album on his (and Eva Prinz's) label the Daydream Library Series. Physically, it was released as a triple CD boxset, where each CD contained one of the album's three compositions. Spirit Counsel peaked on the UK Independent Albums Chart at no. 45.

== Critical reception ==
Professional ratings
Aggregate scores
Source	Rating
Metacritic	71/100
Review scores
Source	Rating
AllMusic	3/5 stars
Mojo	3/5 stars
Pitchfork	7.8/10
Uncut	7/10

According to the review aggregator Metacritic, Spirit Counsel received "generally favorable reviews" based on a weighted average score of 71 out of 100 from seven critic scores.

In a 7.8 out of 10 review for Pitchfork, Stuart Berman believed that Spirit Counsel provided listeners "arguably the most accessible entry point into Moore's boundless experimental canon", singling out "Alice Moki Jayne" as a track that both "rewards your patience handsomely" and "showcases his band at strength". AllMusic's Fred Thomas gave a slightly more mixed assessment of the record; while they called it "an ambitious but focused masterwork of Moore's expansive and specific approach to experimental instrumental music", they said it was "Still locked in the trappings and instrumentation of indie rock".

=== Year-end lists ===
Publication	List	Rank	Ref.
The Quietus	Albums of the Year 2019	88	

== Track listing ==
All tracks are written by Thurston Moore.

Spirit Counsel track listing
No.	Title	Length
1.	"Alice Moki Jayne"	1:03:42
2.	"8 Spring Street"	29:20
3.	"Galaxies"	55:41
Total length:		2:28:43

== Personnel ==
Credits are adapted from the CD box set liner notes.

=== Musicians ===
- Thurston Moore – 12-string electric guitar (1, 3), electric guitar (2)
- Deb Googe – electric baritone bass guitar (1), 12-string electric guitar (3)
- James Sedwards, Jen Chochinov – 12-string electric guitar (1, 3)
- Jem Doultin – drums (1)
- Jon Leidecker – electronics (1)
- Alex Ward, David Toop, Eugene Coyne, James McCartney, Jonah Falco, Joseph Coward, Rachel Aggs, Susan Stenger – 12-string electric guitar (3)

=== Technical ===
- Eva Prinz – production (all tracks)
- Syd Kemp – mixing (all tracks), recording (2)
- Christophe Albertijn – recording (1)
- Lasse Marhaug – mastering (2, 3)
- Abigail Banks – musical assistance (3)
- Baron Beetmoll Troy, Matt Tagliaferro – guitar technician (3)

== Charts ==
Chart performance for Spirit Counsel
Chart (2019)	Peak position
UK Independent Albums (OCC)	45
