= Flow Critical Lucidity =

Studio album by Thurston Moore
- Released: September 20, 2024
- Studios: Total Refreshment Centre, London
- Genres: Experimental rock; no wave
- Length: 38:47
- Label: The Daydream Library Series
- Producers: Thurston Moore; Eva Marie Moore

Thurston Moore studio album chronology
Screen Time (2021)	Flow Critical Lucidity (2024)	They Came Like Swallows (2026)

Singles from Flow Critical Lucidity
- 1. "Hypnogram" Released: February 17, 2023; 2. "Rewilding" Released: April 22, 2024; 3. "San Limites" Released: June 20, 2024; 4. "New in Town" Released: July 25, 2024; 5. "The Diver" Released: August 23, 2024

Flow Critical Lucidity is the 16th solo studio album by American musician Thurston Moore. It was released on September 20, 2024 via Moore's independent label The Daydream Library Series and was self-produced with Eva Marie Moore.

Five attached singles preceded the album, which was Moore's first following the publication of his book Sonic Life: A Memoir. It was subject to critical acclaim upon release and peaked on the UK Independent Albums Chart at no. 12.

== Background and singles ==
On February 17, 2023, Moore released a single entitled "Hypnogram" alongside the announcement of a new album. The following month, Moore released another song, "Isadora", on Bandcamp with an accompanying music video starring Sky Ferreira, directed by Radieux Radio. Radio is an alias for Thurston Moore's wife Eva Marie Moore who has often written lyrics for him as early as The Best Day (2014). Although the song was marketed as a track from the forthcoming album, it was ultimately left off the standard track listing.

In October, Moore's book Sonic Life: A Memoir was published. He would later cancel the book tour due to atrial fibrillation, a health issue that he said he suffered from for years, and Moore would ultimately not release more music from Flow Critical Lucidity until the following year on Earth Day (April 22) with the single "Rewilding". On June 20, 2024, the title, artwork, and release date were revealed with the single "Sans Limites", which features Stereolab's Lætitia Sadier on backing vocals. Moore released two more singles prior to the album: "New in Town" on July 25 (coinciding with his 66th birthday) and "The Diver" on August 23.

== Release and artwork ==
Flow Critical Lucidity was released on September 20, 2024 by Moore's record label The Daydream Library Series. It peaked on the UK Independent and Scottish album charts at no. 12 and no. 46, respectively. Limited editions included a flexi disc containing "Isadora (Bedazzled Mix)".

The artwork is derived from the 1988 painting Samurai Walkman by Jamie Nares, which is featured on the back cover of the album.

== Critical reception ==
Professional ratings
Aggregate scores
Source	Rating
Metacritic	83/100
Review scores
Source	Rating
AllMusic	4/5 stars
Christgau's Consumer Guide	(3-star Honorable Mention)
Clash	7/10
Classic Rock	8/10
Mojo	4/5 stars
PopMatters	8/10
Record Collector	4/5 stars
Spectrum Culture	79%
Uncut	8/10

According to the review aggregator Metacritic, Flow Critical Lucidity received "universal acclaim" based on a weighted average score of 83 out of 100 from seven critic scores.

Jon Buckland of The Quietus wrote "The whole record feels hauled from a dream space where you’re laid on your back letting the sky sink down to you." Reviewing for AllMusic, Fred Thomas said that while "Moore doesn't do much to change his established sound ... the substantial contributions from both [Radieux] Radio and his band allow for the entire crew to go deeper and linger longer in both moments of no wave clatter and the heavy, transcendent bliss that Moore has made his calling card." Christopher J. Lee of PopMatters believed that although it "may not supersede Thurston Moore’s past career peaks", the album demonstrates "the unbounded possibilities of transformation available to [him]".

Both Uncut Magazine and Will Pinfold of Spectrum Culture said that Flow Critical Lucidity ranks highly in Moore's solo discography. Grayson Haver Currin of Mojo went further, considering it to be his best album since Sonic Youth's The Eternal (2009) and saying "this is the closest he's been to tapping back into the feeling in a long time. ... Moore sounds interested in his future again".

=== Year-end lists ===
Publication	List	Rank	Ref.
AllMusic	Favorite Alternative & Indie Albums	N/A (Note: The 2024 year-end list "Favorite Alternative & Indie Albums" on AllMusic lists 59 albums with no specific order.)	
Les Inrocks	Best of 2024	55	
The Quietus	Albums of the Year 2024	96	
Rough Trade UK	Albums of the Year 2024	33	

== Track listing ==
All lyrics are written by Radieux Radio (Eva Marie Moore), except "Shadow" (Thurston Moore); all music is composed by Thurston Moore.

Flow Critical Lucidity track listing
No.	Title	Length
1.	"New in Town"	3:18
2.	"Sans Limites" (feat. Lætitia Sadier)	5:06
3.	"Shadow"	5:01
4.	"Hypnogram"	7:17
5.	"We Get High"	6:12
6.	"Rewilding"	4:00
7.	"The Diver"	7:53
Total length:		38:47

Bandcamp special digital edition bonus tracks
No.	Title	Length
8.	"Isadora"	3:13
9.	"Wet Certificate" (outtake)	7:09
10.	"Hypnogram" (live in Geneva)	7:59
Total length:		57:08

== Personnel ==
Credits are adapted from the CD liner notes.

- Thurston Moore – guitars, vocals
- Deb Googe – bass
- James Sedwards – guitars, organ, piano, glockenspiel
- Jem Doulton – percussion
- Jon Leidecker – electronics
- Lætitia Sadier – backing vocals on "Sans Limites"

Technical and design

- Thurston Moore, Eva Marie Moore – production
- Kristian Craig Robinson – recording at Total Refreshment Centre
- Margo Broom – mixing at Hermitage Works Studios
- Christian Killer Corless – design
- Jamie Nares – artwork (Samurai Walkman)

== Charts ==
Chart (2024)	Peak position
Scottish Albums (OCC)	46
UK Independent Albums (OCC)	12
