= Snowpony =

British rock group

- Origin: London, England
- Years active: 1996–2004
- Labels: Radioactive Records, Rough Trade, See No Evil, Dead Pan Alley
- Past members: Katharine Gifford – Vocals and sampler Debbie Googe – Bass and vocals Debbie Smith – Guitar; Kevin Bass – Drums; Max Corradi – Drums (1996–1998)

Snowpony were a British indie rock group formed in 1996 by Katharine Gifford (Stereolab) and Debbie Googe (My Bloody Valentine).

== History ==
Gifford, who at the time was in Moonshake, gave Googe a tape of songs she had been working on before Moonshake went on a US tour. Googe, who then had recently left My Bloody Valentine, decided to add bass lines to the recordings. After the tour, Gifford listened to what Googe did with the songs, and they decided they wanted to play them live. Gifford and Googe then enlisted drummer Max Corradi whom they knew from his days in Rollerskate Skinny.

Snowpony released "Easy Way Down" and "Chocolate in the Sun" on their own See No Evil label,. and Rough Trade had put out "The Little Girls Understand" as a 7" on their Singles Club. The group then signed to Radioactive Records, and recorded their debut album The Slow Motion World of Snowpony,. with John McEntire in Chicago.

Corradi left shortly after the album's release and he was replaced by Kevin Bass. Ex-Curve and ex-Echobelly member Debbie Smith joined on guitar before the band went on tour.

While the band recorded the follow-up Sea Shanties for Spaceships, they got into a two-year legal dispute with Radioactive, as they wanted to be released from their contract. The band eventually put out the recording themselves under the "Dead Pan Alley" moniker on 11 September 2001.

Their last release, A Fistful of Seahorses, is a six-song EP that was put out as an internet download in 2003. The band split up the following year.

== Discography ==
=== Albums ===
- The Slow Motion World of Snowpony (Aug. 25, 1998, Radioactive) - US CMJ No. 7
- Sea Shanties for Spaceships (2001, Dead Pan Alley)

=== Singles and extended plays ===
- "Easy Way Down" (1996, See No Evil) - UK No. 192
- "The Little Girls Understand" (1996, Rough Trade)
- "Chocolate in the Sun" (1997, See No Evil)
- "John Brown" (1998, Radioactive) - UK No. 197
- A Fistful of Seahorses (EP) (2003)
