= Wally Shoup =

American jazz musician (1944–2024)

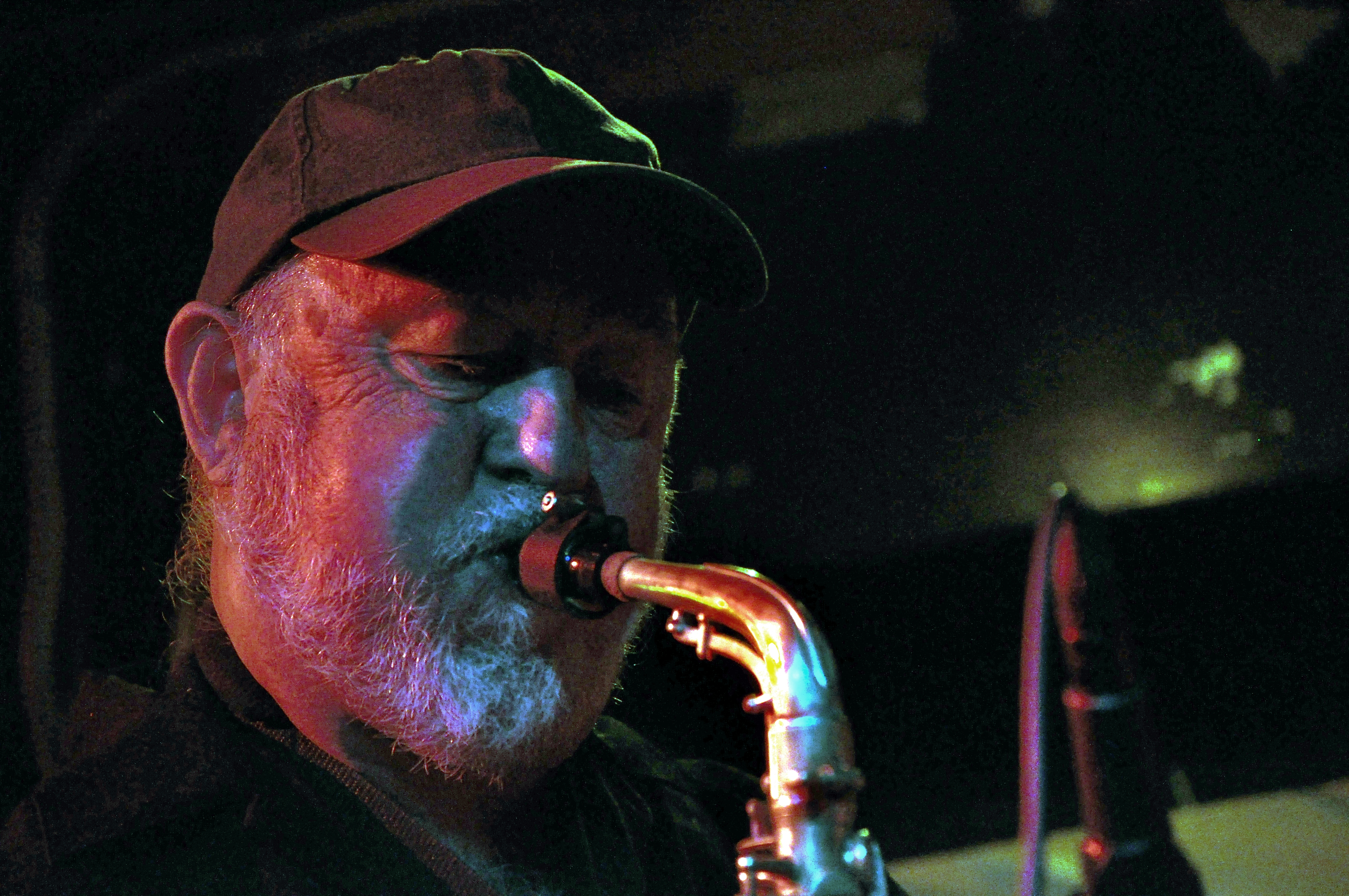
- Wally Shoup performing in 2009

Background information
- Born: August 9, 1944; North Carolina, US
- Died: March 5, 2024 (aged 79) Seattle, US
- Genres: Free improvisation, jazz
- Occupation(s): Musician, and painter
- Instrument: alto saxophone
- Website: speakeasy.org/~wallyshp/wshoup/

Wally Shoup (August 9, 1944–March 5, 2024) was an American jazz alto saxophonist, painter, and author. Based in Seattle, Washington, since 1985, Shoup was a mainstay of that city's improvised music scene. Seattle Metropolitan named him one of the 50 most influential musicians in that city's history.

== Biography ==
=== Early life ===
Born in North Carolina and raised in Charlotte, Shoup initially worked as a schoolteacher. He moved to Atlanta, Georgia, in the late 1960s, then to Colorado in 1970, where he lived in Manitou Springs and later Colorado Springs.

=== Views on Music ===
By his own account, Shoup "grew up listening to Black music in the South, the blues and jazz and R&B," and was "introduced to free jazz in the late '60s… in Atlanta.". Although his "voice is definitely influenced by African-American music" he "kind of felt like free jazz was the domain of Black musicians." Hearing Britain's Music Improvisation Company, "he simultaneously discovered free improvisation and his calling as a musician," "It wasn't jazz-based," he would say in 2003." They were trying to find some new ways of improvising. I realized that was the kind of music I wanted to know about, and the only way I could know more about it was by playing it."

=== Music career ===
While in Colorado, Shoup had a three-hour weekly show on KRCC, the Colorado College radio station, where, by Jason Heller's account (2003), he played jazz and experimental music from his own extensive collection and "began using the studio itself as an instrument, manipulating multiple turntables and mixing in guest musicians who would improvise over the records…" Describing a band he organized during this period, the Creative Music Ensemble (active circa 1973–74), Shoup later said, "I was still developing some chops on the sax, so I wasn't a player yet; I was just the instigator. I had them play a number of gigs, and it just outraged and pissed people off. … People didn't know what to make of it. It was kind of like Mahavishnu meets Merzbow or something."

In 1975, he became an active organizer, deejay, and player of music merging free jazz, free improvisation, and noise. After deciding he was ready to play the saxophone as a performer, he formed his first trio, in Colorado, with Ross Rabin and Keith Gardner, incorporating contact microphones on metal objects to create "noisescapes." He released his first album, Scree-Run Waltz, in 1981.

In 1983, he moved to Birmingham, Alabama, where he performed with Trans Duo (Davey Williams and LaDonna Smith), wrote for the Improvisor magazine, and worked with dancer Mary Horn, with whom he toured Europe in 1985, after which he moved to Seattle.

Shortly after arriving in Seattle, Shoup became an early organizer of that city's Improvised Music Festival, which began that year and which became the United States' longest-running improvised music festival. Among the groups he performed with were the New Art Orchestra and Catabatics. In 2010 he participated in and helped organize the 25th anniversary Seattle Improvised Music Festival.

In 1994, he and cellist Brent Arnold formed Project W, who would eventually open for Sonic Youth in Seattle in 1998. Writing in 1999, Andrew Bartlett described this as "Shoup's most vaunted ensemble… whose debut CD of the same name on the Apraxia label has become the stuff of legend." Bartlett singled out their emphasis on relatively short pieces as unusual for free improvisors.

Shoup recorded two CDs with Thurston Moore of Sonic Youth Hurricane Floyd (Subliminal, 2000) and Live at Tonic (Leo Records, 2003) with Paul Flaherty and Chris Corsano. He also made two recordings with Nels Cline of Wilco: Immolation/Immersion (CD, 2005) and Suite: Bittersweet (LP, 2007), both on Strange Attractors Audio House.

=== Wally Shoup Trio ===
Shoup formed the Wally Shoup Trio in 2001 with bassist Reuben Radding and drummer Bob Rees. Speaking of his work in 2003, Shoup said, "I'm not quite as abstract as I used to be. On my new stuff, I'll play motifs and melodies and occasionally even a tune … I see noise as just another element to play with, just another texture or color or detail." Other projects included Spider Trio (with Jeffery Taylor and Dave Abramson) and the Wally Shoup Quartet (with Gust Burns, Bob Rees, and Paul Kikuchi).

Shoup performed at the Vancouver Jazz Festival (Vancouver, B.C.), Earshot Jazz Festival (Seattle), Le Weekend (Scotland), Birmingham Improvised Music Festival (Birmingham, Alabama), Seattle Improvised Music Festival, and Open-Circuit Interact (Belgium). In 2007 he received a City of Seattle Arts grant to work on improvised music, and in 2009 Seattle Metropolitan Magazine named him one of the 50 most influential musicians in that city's history.

== Partial discography ==
- Subduction Zone (Nunatak, 2012) - trio with Dennis Rea and Tom Zgonc
- The Levitation Shuffle (Clean Feed Records, 2007) - quartet with Reuben Radding, Greg Campbell, and Gust Burns
- Bounced Check (Tyyfus Records, LP, 2007) - trio with Chris Corsano and Paul Flaherty
- Suite: Bittersweet (Strange Attractors Audio House, LP, 2007) - trio with Nels Cline and Greg Campbell
- Blue Purge (Leo Records, CD, 2004) - trio with Reuben Radding and Bob Rees
- Confluxus (Leo Records, CD, 2004) - trio with Toshi Makihara and Brent Arnold
- Live at Tonic (Leo Records, CD, 2003) - quartet with Thurston Moore, Paul Flaherty, and Chris Corsano
- Fusillades and Lamentations (Leo Records, CD, 2003) - trio with Reuben Radding and Bob Rees
- Stackpole (First World, CD, 2001) - quartet led and recorded by Dennis Rea
- Hurricane Floyd (Sublingual, CD, 2000) - live recording with Thurston Moore and Toshi Makihara
- Project W (Apraxia, CD, 1994) - trio with Brent Arnold and Ed Pias
- Scree-Run Waltz (Too Sound, LP, 1981) - duo with Ross Rabin

== Publications ==
- Music As Adventure: The Collected Writings of Wally Shoup (2011), Nine Muses Books, ISBN 1-878888-70-6
