= By the Fire =

Studio album by Thurston Moore
- Released: September 25, 2020
- Studios: Total Refreshment Center (London); The Church (London)
- Genre: Rock
- Length: 82:14
- Label: The Daydream Library Series
- Producer: Eva Prinz

Thurston Moore chronology
Spirit Counsel (2019)	By the Fire (2020)	Screen Time (2021)

Singles from By the Fire
- 1. "Hashish" Released: June 20, 2020; 2. "Siren" Released: September 2, 2020

By the Fire is the thirteenth solo studio album by the American musician Thurston Moore, released on September 25, 2020, via The Daydream Library Series.

== Recording ==
Most of the album was recorded by Kristian Craig Robinson at Total Refreshment Centre, London. Otherwise, "Breath" was recorded by Paul Epworth at The Church Studios (also in London), and both "Calligraphy" and "Dreamers Work" were recorded in Paris, France.

== Title ==
Moore claimed that the album's release was a political act, saying "Any time you put out a record, ... that's a political move. You're actually engaging in a social world. I called it By the Fire because of that. [It's] the idea of people sitting around a fire and dialoguing."

== Release ==
By the Fire was released on September 25, 2020, by The Daydream Library Series. It subsequently peaked on the UK Independent and Scottish Albums Charts at no. 10 and no. 49, respectively.

== Critical reception ==
Professional ratings
Aggregate scores
Source	Rating
AnyDecentMusic?	7.6/10
Metacritic	83/100
Review scores
Source	Rating
AllMusic	4.5/5 stars
Beats Per Minute	73%
Exclaim!	5/10
The Line of Best Fit	8/10
Loud and Quiet	7/10
MusicOMH	4/5 stars
NME	4/5 stars
Pitchfork	7.8/10
Record Collector	5/5 stars
Uncut	4/5 stars

According to the review aggregator Metacritic, By the Fire received "universal acclaim" based on a weighted average score of 83 out of 100 from thirteen critic scores. The review aggregator AnyDecentMusic? gave the album a weighted average score of 7.6 out of 10 from fourteen critic scores.

Stuart Berman of Pitchfork praised the album and said of its almost ninety-minute length: "it's a record that justifies and even demands the extra space to explore." Daniel Sylvester of Exclaim! was less effusive, calling the album "boring and tedious".

== Track listing ==
All lyrics are written by Radieux Radio, except "Cantaloupe" and "Breath" (Thurston Moore).

By the Fire track listing
No.	Title	Length
1.	"Hashish"	5:46
2.	"Cantaloupe"	4:44
3.	"Breath"	10:48
4.	"Siren"	12:17
5.	"Calligraphy"	5:20
6.	"Locomotives"	16:48
7.	"Dreamers Work"	4:57
8.	"They Believe in Love [When They Look at You]"	7:50
9.	"Venus" (instrumental)	13:44
Total length:		82:14

== Personnel ==
Credits are adapted from the CD liner notes.

=== Musicians ===
- Thurston Moore – guitars (all tracks), vocals (except 9)
- Deb Googe – bass (1–4, 6, 8, 9), background vocals (3)
- James Sedwards – guitar (1–4, 6, 8, 9)
- Jem Doulton – percussion (1, 2, 4, 6, 8, 9)
- Steve Shelley – percussion (3)
- Jon Leidecker – electronics (6, 8, 9)

=== Technical and design ===
- Eva Prinz – production (all tracks)
- Syd Kemp – recording at Total Refreshement Centre (1, 2, 4, 6, 8, 9)
- Kristian Craig Robinson – recording at Total Refreshement Centre (1, 2, 4, 6, 8, 9)
- Paul Epworth – recording at The Church Studios, London (3)
- Randall Dunn – mixing at Avast, Seattle (3)
- Tibo Javoy – mixing in Venice (5, 7)
- Lasse Marhaug – mastering (all tracks)
- Laurent Orseau – photography
- Niko Bruggemans – artwork

== Charts ==
Chart performance for By the Fire
Chart (2020)	Peak position
Belgian Albums (Ultratop Flanders)	86
Scottish Albums (OCC)	49
UK Albums Sales (OCC)	40
UK Independent Albums (OCC)	10
