= Mix Tape: The Art of Cassette Culture =

2005 book by Thurston Moore

- Author: Thurston Moore
- Cover artist: The Simultaneous Workshop
- Language: English
- Genre: Music
- Publisher: Universe Publishing (a division of Rizzoli International Publications, Inc.)
- Publication date: May 3, 2005
- Publication place: USA
- Pages: 96
- ISBN: 0-7893-1199-2
- OCLC: 60650625
- Dewey Decimal: 781.64/149 22
- LC Class: ML3918.P67 M59 2004

Mix Tape: The Art of Cassette Culture is a 2005 book edited by musician Thurston Moore on Universe Publishing.

== Synopsis ==
The book is a collection of stories, essays, art, and other contributions by various artists, musicians, and writers. It centers around the role of the mixtape and cassette culture in the lives of the contributors, which stands as a testimony to the importance of the medium starting in the late 1970s to its relevance today. Here tapes are used mostly to confess love or admiration, or to expose an acquaintance to new and underground music.

=== Contributors ===
Lasse Marhaug, Pat Griffin, Ahmet Zappa, Karen Constance aka Karen Lollypop, Mike Watt, Glen E. Friedman, Cynthia Connolly, Galaxie 500, Tom Greenwood of Jackie-O Motherfucker, David Choe, Matias Viegener, Lili Dwight, Mac McCaughan, Dodie Bellamy, Dan Graham, William Winant, Jim O'Rourke, Leah Singer, Ryan McGinness, Jutta Koether, Richard Kern, Rita Ackermann, Robert Bellinger, John Miller, Trisha Donnelly, Georganne Deen, Sue de Beer, Sharon Cheslow, Slim Moon, Allison Anders, Mary Gaitskill, Spencer Sweeney, Elizabeth Peyton, Genevieve Dellinger, Loren Mazzacane Connors, Camden Joy, Bret McCabe, Christian Schumann, DJ Spooky, Jade Gordon, Daniella Meeker, John Sinclair, Kate Spade, Andy Spade, Tony Conrad, Christopher Knowles, Christian Marclay, Tom Sachs

== Reception ==
Carl Wilson, of The Globe and Mail, found that "[like] a lot of mix tapes, [the book was] self-congratulatory, but flush with charm."
