= Colin Webster (musician) =

British experimental and improvisational musician

Colin Webster (born 1983) is a British experimental and improvisational musician (tenor saxophone, baritone saxophone, electronics). In the 2000s, he was a member of The Spasm Band led by led by Trinidadian poet, novelist and lecturer Anthony Joseph. Described as a "force for good on the free jazz and improv scene", he works in duos with drummer Mark Holub and turntablist Graham Dunning, and performs with Dutch free jazz/noise trio Dead Neanderthals. He has played with many key musicians of the current scene, including Mark Holub, Archie Shepp, Steve Noble, Alex Ward (musician) and others. In 2015, Webster formed the Kodian Trio with Dirk Serries (guitar) and Andrew Lisle (drums), with an initial performance at London’s Cafe Oto and three subsequent albums.

On his solo album Vs Amp (2022), Webster played his saxophone through a Fender Twin and Bassman amplifier; Noel Gardner wrote in The Quietus: “This is music that is not bound by rules or limitations, for listeners and artists alike.”

Since 2012 Colin has run the Raw Tonk label, specialising in free jazz and improvised music.
