= They Came Like Swallows =

Studio album by Bonner Kramer and Thurston Moore
- Released: May 1, 2026
- Genres: Ambient; avant-rock
- Length: 40:03
- Label: Silver Current
- Producer: Bonner Kramer

Bonner Kramer chronology
...And the Crimson Moon Whispers Goodbye (2025)	They Came Like Swallows (2026)

Thurston Moore studio album chronology
Flow Critical Lucidity (2024)	They Came Like Swallows (2026)

Singles from They Came Like Swallows
- 1. "Urn Burial" Released: February 17, 2026; 2. "Insight" Released: March 10, 2026

They Came Like Swallows – Seven Requiems for the Children of Gaza is a collaborative studio album by Bonner Kramer and Thurston Moore, released on May 1, 2026, through Silver Current Records. Dedicated to the children killed during the Gaza genocide, it is their first record as a duo, with six original instrumental created from a mix of Moore's improvised home recordings on the guitar and Kramer's composed instrumentation overdubs.

Preceded by the singles "Urn Burial" and "Insight", the latter a cover of the Joy Division song of the same name, They Came Like Swallows was met with positive reception upon release and has been described as ambient music and avant-rock.

== Background and recording ==
Both experimental musicians originating from the early 1980s New York City experimental music scene, Bonner Kramer (more widely known simply as Kramer) and Thurston Moore (formerly of Sonic Youth) had long been friends but never officially collaborated just as a duo. Moore originally became aware of Kramer for his work with people such as John Zorn and Eugene Chadbourne. In the early 1980s, Sonic Youth recorded their first demos in a West Broadway studio called Noise New York. Kramer later bought the studio, and according to Moore, "it became the place to go to that was affordable, especially if you're doing kind of weird music that was really on the margins of everything." With Kramer as the studio's engineer, Moore often recorded there with people such as Don Fleming. By the late 1990s, they lost contact with each other.

Decades later, while renting out his mother's residence in Coral Gables in South Miami, Florida, Moore reconnected with Kramer through Frank Eaton, the original proprietor of Noise New York. Kramer had been residing in Hollywood, Florida, and the three of them would subsequently meet together often with their wives to eat. Kramer eventually moved to Asheville, North Carolina, and he contacted Moore lamenting that they should have recorded together when he was still there.

In March 2024, he briefly flew down to Miami and set up some recording equipment in Moore's home, directing him to improvise on his guitars. These recordings spanned two days in twenty-minute bursts. The first song they made ultimately became the opener, "Urn Burial". For the first three tracks of the album, Kramer had worked on the material beforehand, whereas the subsequent three tracks originated from Moore's guitar improvisations. Additionally, Kramer came up with the idea to record Moore's vocals for a cover of the song "Insight" by Joy Division. He then brought the recordings back to his home studio in Asheville and mixed everything together to create an album's length of material.

They Came Like Swallows is dedicated to the children of Gaza killed during the Gaza genocide. When they were recording together, the subject did not come up in conversation, and the decision to dedicate the record occurred afterwards. Moore said the album is an offering of their music "as a sonic activism and as a beneficent energy".

== Titling ==
Multiple tracks draw their titles from literary works. The opener "Urn Burial" is the title of Robert Westall's 1987 science fiction novel, "The Redness in the West" alludes to the subtitle of Blood Meridian by Cormac McCarthy, and "They Came Like Swallows" refers to the 1937 novel of the same name.

== Composition ==
They Came Like Swallows has been described as ambient music and avant-rock. Overall, it focuses largely on texture rather than melody, possessing much in common with Kramer's previous album ...And the Crimson Moon Whispers Goodbye. On top of Kramer's strings, synthesizers, and ambient textures, Moore relies on chords, arpeggios, and noise on the guitar. Kramer said that minimalist composers were a large source of musical inspiration for They Came Like Swallows, citing Terry Riley, Gavin Bryars, Morton Feldman, and Pauline Oliveros as examples. For the opener "Urn Burial" in particular, the works of artists like Riley and Charlemagne Palestine informed the music.

The final track is a cover of "Insight", originally the fourth track from Joy Division's debut album Unknown Pleasures (1979). The only track with vocals, both musicians sing in unison over a drum machine, and compared to the original, Kramer and Moore's rendition is slower and features more feedback.

== Promotion, singles, and release ==
On February 17, 2026, Kramer and Moore announced They Came Like Swallows and previewed the album with the lead single "Urn Burial". Then, on March 10, they released the album's closer, the Joy Division cover "Insight", as the second single.

In late March 2026, they performed for the first time as a duo at Big Ears Festival in Tennessee, largely adhering to the material from the album instead of the more typical improvised set. They Came Like Swallows was released on May 1 via Silver Current Records, and a portion of the proceeds were apportioned to World Central Kitchen.

== Critical reception ==
Professional ratings
Aggregate scores
Source	Rating
Metacritic	79/100
Review scores
Source	Rating
AllMusic	4/5 stars
Mojo	4/5 stars
Spectrum Culture	80%
Uncut	7/10

According to the review aggregator Metacritic, They Came Like Swallows received "generally favorable reviews" based on a weighted average score of 79 out of 100 from five critic scores. Writing for The Quietus, Archie Forde said that the guitar qualities that had originally made Moore an important figure in experimental and alternative music are retained here, adding that Kramer's contributions provide "layers of emotion to Moore's improvisation".

AllMusic's Fred Thomas opined that the duo "interact with each other's fiery and ungovernable sounds effortlessly" and that there is an emotional and consistently atmospheric quality to the music. Will Pinfold of Spectrum Culture thought that the contrasts between the "smooth and jagged elements ... create unexpected and potent effects", concluding by saying if listeners were completely unaware of the record's background, the music itself remains "an audibly troubled, poignant piece of work".

== Track listing ==
All tracks are written by Bonner Kramer and Thurston Moore, except "Insight" (Ian Curtis, Peter Hook, Stephen Morris, and Bernard Sumner).

They Came Like Swallows track listing
No.	Title	Length
1.	"Urn Burial"	5:50
2.	"The Redness in the West"	4:59
3.	"The Third Migration"	5:01
4.	"They Came Like Swallows"	4:11
5.	"The Living Theater"	7:10
6.	"The Oceans Are Dying"	7:05
7.	"Insight" (Joy Division cover)	5:44
Total length:		40:03

== Personnel ==
Credits are adapted from the vinyl liner notes.

- Bonner Kramer – bass, organ, piano, sampler, vocals, production, mixing, mastering
- Thurston Moore – guitars, vocals
