= Sonic Life: A Memoir =

Book by Thurston Moore

- Author: Thurston Moore
- Language: English
- Genre: Autobiography
- Publisher: Faber & Faber
- Publication date: October 23, 2023
- Publication place: United Kingdom
- Pages: 468
- ISBN: 978-0-571-37394-9

Sonic Life: A Memoir is a 2023 autobiography by former Sonic Youth guitarist, vocalist and songwriter Thurston Moore.

== Publication ==
Sonic Life was first published in the UK by Faber & Faber on October 23, 2023. It was published in the United States by Doubleday, a division of Penguin Random House. The title is derived from a tattoo the author got to celebrate his marriage to his first wife and then-bandmate, Kim Gordon.

== Content ==
Sonic Life is an account of Moore's life up to the break up of Sonic Youth, focusing largely on his experiences of the punk and alternative rock scene in the 1970s and 1980s. It contains accounts of Moore's own musical development, which began with hearing The Kingsmen's "Louie Louie" aged five years old, and of his relationships with other major acts of the period, including Glenn Branca, Patti Smith, and Nirvana. The book also discusses the formation of Moore's most famous band, Sonic Youth, and their progress from no-wave outsiders to pillar of alternative music.

== Reception ==
The memoir received generally favourable reviews. Alexis Petridis of The Guardian noted that the book focuses on a "nerd's eye view" of the American music underground in lieu of "personal confession", a theme also picked up in a more critical review by Pitchfork. In a five-star review for Louder Sound, Paul Brannigan described the memoir as "an absolute joy" praising it as a "fascinating documentation of the genesis and growth of America's alternative rock scene, by one of its key players".
