= Improvisations (Charles Hayward and Thurston Moore album) =

Studio album by Charles Hayward and Thurston Moore
- Released: 8 December 2017
- Recorded: 2 February 2017
- Studio: Lynchmob (London)
- Genre: Noise
- Length: 47:56
- Label: Care in the Community

Charles Hayward chronology
Punk (2016)	Improvisations (2017)	Objects of Desire (2019)

Thurston Moore chronology
Rock n Roll Consciousness (2017)	Improvisations (2017)	Spirit Counsel (2019)

Improvisations is a collaborative album by English drummer Charles Hayward and American guitarist Thurston Moore, released on 8 December 2017 through the label Care in the Community. It received mostly mixed to positive reviews by critics.

== Background and recording ==
Improvisations was recorded at Lynchmob Studios in London in a single day on 2 February 2017, marking the third time the duo – consisting of Charles Hayward (formerly of This Heat) and Thurston Moore (formerly of Sonic Youth) – had played together. As the title suggests, the record consists of improvisational material. Before its release later in the year, Moore released his solo album Rock n Roll Consciousness in April.

== Promotion and release ==
On 24 October 2017, Moore announced Improvisations and shared a twelve-minute video of the duo, which showed the duo recording the track "B3". The album was later released on 8 December through the label Care in the Community, who issued a limited run of five hundred copies.

== Critical reception ==
Professional ratings
Aggregate scores
Source	Rating
AnyDecentMusic?	5.7/10
Metacritic	65/100
Review scores
Source	Rating
Clash	6/10
Drowned in Sound	8/10
The Guardian	3/5 stars
The Independent	3/5 stars
The Line of Best Fit	6.5/10
Pitchfork	5.6/10
Q	4/5 stars
Record Collector	4/5 stars
Under the Radar	3/10

According to the review aggregator Metacritic, Improvisations received "generally favorable reviews" based on a weighted average score of 65 out of 100 from 13 critic scores. On another aggregator AnyDecentMusic?, it was given a more mixed average of 5.7 out of 10, based on a sample of eight critical reviews.

== Track listing ==
Improvisations A-side track listing
No.	Title	Length
1.	"A1"	10:27
2.	"A2"	2:27
3.	"A3"	11:23
Total length:		24:17

B-side track listing
No.	Title	Length
1.	"B1"	7:03
2.	"B2"	5:51
3.	"B3"	5:55
4.	"B4"	4:50
Total length:		23:39

== Personnel ==
Credits are adapted from the LP liner notes.

- Charles Hayward – drums, keyboards
- Thurston Moore – guitars
- Max Heyes – engineering
- Paul Knight-Malciak – mixing
- Luis Carvajal – sleeve art and design
- Sam Brereton – illustration
