= Rock n Roll Consciousness =

Studio album by Thurston Moore
- Released: April 28, 2017
- Recorded: 2016
- Studio: The Church (London)
- Genres: Rock; post-rock
- Length: 42:58
- Labels: Caroline International; Fiction
- Producer: Paul Epworth

Thurston Moore chronology
The Best Day (2014)	Rock n Roll Consciousness (2017)	Improvisations (2017)

Rock n Roll Consciousness is the eleventh solo studio album by American rock musician Thurston Moore. The album was released on April 28, 2017 by Caroline International and Fiction Records. It was recorded in London at The Church Studios in 2016 and was produced by Paul Epworth.

== Critical reception ==
Professional ratings
Aggregate scores
Source	Rating
AnyDecentMusic?	7.5/10
Metacritic	78/100
Review scores
Source	Rating
AllMusic	3.5/5 stars
The A.V. Club	B+
Clash	8/10
Drowned in Sound	8/10
The Line of Best Fit	7/10
musicOMH	4.5/5 stars
Pitchfork	7.7/10
PopMatters	7/10
Record Collector	4/5 stars
The Skinny	3/5 stars

According to the review aggregator Metacritic, Rock n Roll Consciousness received "generally favorable reviews" based on a weighted average score of 78 out of 100 from 18 critic scores. AnyDecentMusic?, another review aggregator, gave the album 7.5 out of 10 based on 17 critics' scores.

=== Year-end lists ===
Publication	List	Rank	Ref.
The Quietus	Albums of the Year 2017	33	
Rough Trade	Albums of the Year	25	

== Track listing ==
All music is composed by Thurston Moore.

Rock n Roll Consciousness track listing
No.	Title	Lyrics	Length
1.	"Exalted"	Radieux Radio	11:54
2.	"Cusp"	Radio	6:34
3.	"Turn On"	Thurston Moore	10:18
4.	"Smoke of Dreams"	Moore	6:04
5.	"Aphrodite"	Radio	8:08
Total length:			42:58

Japanese bonus tracks
No.	Title	Writer(s)	Length
6.	"Cease Fire"	Moore	6:04
7.	"Mx. Liberty"	Moore	3:13
Total length:			52:15

== Personnel ==
Credits adapted from the CD liner notes, except where noted.

=== Thurston Moore Group ===
- Thurston Moore – guitars, vocals
- James Sedwards – guitars
- Deb Googe – bass, backing vocals
- Steve Shelley – drums

=== Technical and design ===
- Paul Epworth – production, recording at The Church, London
- Randall Dunn – mixing at Avast! Recording Company, Seattle
- Jason Ward – mastering at CMS, Chicago
- Vera Marmelo – portrait of Thurston Moore
- Radieux Radio – illustration
- Juliette Cezzar – design
- Syd Kemp – mixing, engineering on "Mx. Liberty" and "Cease Fire"

== Charts ==
Rock n Roll Consciousness chart performance
Chart (2017)	Peak position
Belgian Albums (Ultratop Flanders)	23
Belgian Albums (Ultratop Wallonia)	52
Dutch Albums (Album Top 100)	151
French Albums (SNEP)	167
German Albums (Offizielle Top 100)	66
Scottish Albums (OCC)	39
UK Albums (OCC)	65
