= Trees Outside the Academy =

Studio album by Thurston Moore
- Released: September 18, 2007
- Recorded: 2007 Amherst, Massachusetts
- Genre: Alternative rock
- Length: 46:07
- Label: Ecstatic Peace!
- Producers: John Agnello and Thurston Moore

Thurston Moore chronology
Psychic Hearts (1995)	Trees Outside the Academy (2007)	Sensitive/Lethal (2008)

Professional ratings
Aggregate scores
Source	Rating
Metacritic	77/100
Review scores
Source	Rating
AllMusic	4/5 stars
The A.V. Club	A−
Robert Christgau	(1-star Honorable Mention)
Pitchfork	7.9/10
Rolling Stone	3.5/5 stars
Stylus Magazine	C−

Trees Outside the Academy is the second solo studio album by American musician Thurston Moore of Sonic Youth. It was released on September 18, 2007, on Moore's own label, Ecstatic Peace! and recorded with Sonic Youth's drummer Steve Shelley and violinist Samara Lubelski.

The recording took place at Dinosaur Jr. guitarist J. Mascis' home studio. Mascis also contributed lead guitar for some tracks. It features the track "Thurston @ 13" which is, "Some weird cassette tape that Thurston found at his mom's of him at 13 years old in the early '70s performing some kind of odd sound-theatre."

The album debuted at #6 on the Billboard Heatseekers chart, barely missing the Billboard 200.

== Track listing ==
All tracks by Thurston Moore.

1. "Frozen Gtr." – 4:07
2. "The Shape Is in a Trance" – 4:41
3. "Honest James" – 3:52
4. "Silver>Blue" – 5:52
5. "Fri/End" – 3:33
6. "American Coffin" – 3:58
7. "Wonderful Witches + Language Meanies" – 2:26
8. "Off Work" – 4:14
9. "Never Light" – 4:03
10. "Free Noise Among Friends" – 0:36
11. "Trees Outside the Academy" – 6:07
12. "Thurston@13" – 2:38

== Personnel ==
- Thurston Moore – acoustic & electric guitars, bass, vocals, piano on track 6
- Steve Shelley – drums on tracks 1, 2, 4, 5, 8, 9 & 11
- Samara Lubelski – violin on tracks 1, 2, 4, 5, 8, 9 & 11
- J Mascis – lead guitar on tracks 1, 2, 7 & 11
- Gown – electric guitar on track 1 & 9
- John Moloney – drums on track 7
- Christina Carter – vocals on tracks 1 & 3
- Leslie Keffer – noise on track 8

== Chart positions ==
Chart (2007)	Peak position
Belgian Albums Chart (Vl)	47
French SNEP Albums Chart	176
Norwegian Albums Chart	18
US Billboard Heatseekers Albums	6
