= Screen Time (album) =

Studio album by Thurston Moore
- Released: February 5, 2021

Thurston Moore chronology
| By the Fire (2020) | Screen Time (2021) | Flow Critical Lucidity (2024) |

Screen Time is the 14th solo studio album by Thurston Moore which was surprise-released for Bandcamp Friday. The album consists of 10 instrumental guitar tracks.

== Title ==
Moore said of the title "While our societies have become wholly engaged with the virtual universe of online interaction the work of filmmakers, musicians, painters, poets and dancers continues to offer dreamworld expressions of both reality and the imagination. Art is an offering. When you open up your screen, send a message of love and gratitude to someone. If it’s within your means, send aid to those in need. Screen time is now time, it is always time for change. A change for the better. What better time than now. Create, instigate, debate, never hate, sleep late, embrace fate, make a movie date, destroy and skate."

== Critical reception ==
Professional ratings
Aggregate scores
| Source | Rating |
|---|---|
| Metacritic | 71/100 |
Review scores
| Source | Rating |
| Clash | 7/10 |
| Mojo | 3/5 stars |
| Record Collector | 3/5 stars |
| Uncut | 7/10 |

According to the review aggregator Metacritic, Screen Time received "generally favorable reviews" based on a weighted average score of 71 out of 100 from 6 critic scores.

Consequence of Sound praised the "minimalist-style music" of the album and said, "If Moore's intention was to limit our "screen time" and make us retreat into his aural world, then he may have just succeeded." Exclaim! called the album "a seriously meditative effort".

== Track listing ==
All tracks written by Thurston Moore.

1. "The Station" – 2:43
2. "The Town" – 4:13
3. "The Home" – 5:05
4. "The View" – 4:13
5. "The Neighbor" – 1:46
6. "The Upstairs" – 4:03
7. "The Dream" – 4:12
8. "The Walk" – 2:43
9. "The Parkbench" – 2:19
10. "The Realization" – 8:55
