= Demolished Thoughts =

Studio album by Thurston Moore
- Released: May 24, 2011
- Recorded: 2010
- Genre: Acoustic rock
- Label: Matador
- Producer: Beck

Thurston Moore chronology
Sensitive/Lethal (2008)	Demolished Thoughts (2011)	The Best Day (2014)

Professional ratings
Aggregate scores
Source	Rating
Metacritic	78/100
Review scores
Source	Rating
AllMusic	4/5 stars
The A.V. Club	A
Clash	7/10
Drowned in Sound	8/10
MSN Music (Expert Witness)	A−
Pitchfork	8.1/10
Slant Magazine	3/5 stars

Demolished Thoughts is the ninth solo studio album by American musician Thurston Moore. Mojo placed the album at number 18 on its list of "Top 50 albums of 2011" while Uncut placed the album at number 23.

== Background and recording ==
Demolished Thoughts was produced by Beck and recorded in 2010 in Massachusetts and Los Angeles. The title derives from the Faith's "It’s Time".

== Track listing ==
All songs written by Thurston Moore.

1. "Benediction" – 5:16
2. "Illuminine" – 4:02
3. "Circulation" – 4:10
4. "Blood Never Lies" – 5:07
5. "Orchard Street" – 6:56
6. "In Silver Rain with a Paper Key" – 5:43
7. "Mina Loy" – 4:02
8. "Space" – 6:39
9. "January" – 4:52
10. "This Train Is Bound for Glory" (iTunes Bonus Track)

== Personnel ==
- Thurston Moore - guitar, vocals
- Beck Hansen - synths, vocals, bass, producer
- Samara Lubelski - violin
- Mary Lattimore - harp
- Bram Inscore - bass
- Joey Waronker - percussion

== See also ==
- Mina Loy
- Orchard Street (Manhattan)
