= Psychic Hearts =

Studio album by Thurston Moore
- Released: May 9, 1995
- Recorded: 1994–1995
- Studio: New York City
- Genre: Art pop
- Length: 65:37
- Label: Geffen
- Producer: Thurston Moore

Thurston Moore chronology
Psychic Hearts (1995)	Trees Outside the Academy (2007)

Psychic Hearts (stylized as Psychic ♡♡♡ and Psychic ♡♡♡'s) is the debut solo studio album by former Sonic Youth member Thurston Moore, released in 1995 through Geffen Records. The album was remastered and reissued in 2006. The two-record vinyl version of the reissue contains bonus tracks on the fourth album side where on the original vinyl release the fourth side had a drawing by cover artist Rita Ackermann etched directly into the vinyl.

== Critical reception ==
Professional ratings
Review scores
Source	Rating
AllMusic	4.5/5 stars
Christgau's Consumer Guide	(1-star Honorable Mention)
Entertainment Weekly	B+
Guitar World	4/5 stars
NME	7/10
Pitchfork	7.6/10
Rolling Stone	3.5/5 stars
Spin (1995)	6/10
Spin (2007)	3/5 stars

The New York Times called Psychic Hearts "an album of arty pop songs in which the vocals stand out more than the guitars." The Guardian noted that "'Feathers' resembles both the Replacements and New Order."

When Psychic Hearts was re-released in 2006, it was praised by critic Brandon Stosuy of Pitchfork.

== Track listing ==
All songs written by Thurston Moore.

1. "Queen Bee and Her Pals" – 2:57
2. "Ono Soul" – 3:28
3. "Psychic Hearts" – 3:59
4. "Pretty Bad" – 3:58
5. "Patti Smith Math Scratch" – 2:43
6. "Blues from Beyond the Grave" – 4:35
7. "See-Through Playmate" – 2:18
8. "Hang Out" – 4:10
9. "Feathers" – 2:20
10. "Tranquilizer" – 2:06
11. "Staring Statues" – 2:34
12. "Cindy (Rotten Tanx)" – 3:46
13. "Cherry's Blues" – 2:05
14. "Female Cop" – 5:24
15. "Elegy for All the Dead Rock Stars" – 19:49

=== 2006 reissue bonus vinyl tracks ===
1. "Teenage Buddhist Daydream" – 2:36
2. "Just Tell Her That I Really Like Her" – 3:02
3. "The Church Should Be for the Outcast, Not a Church That Casts People Out" – 6:47
4. "Thoodblirsty Thesbians" – 6:09
5. "Superchrist" – 3:10

== Personnel ==
- Thurston Moore – vocals, guitar, bass, composer, producer

Additional musicians

- Tim Foljahn – guitar
- Steve Shelley – drums

Technical personnel

- Rita Ackermann – cover art
- Edward Douglas – engineer, mixing
- Frank Olinsky – art direction
- Lee Ranaldo – engineer, mixing
- John Siket – engineer, mixing
- Howie Weinberg – mastering
