= Samara Lubelski =

American singer, violinist, guitarist and bassist

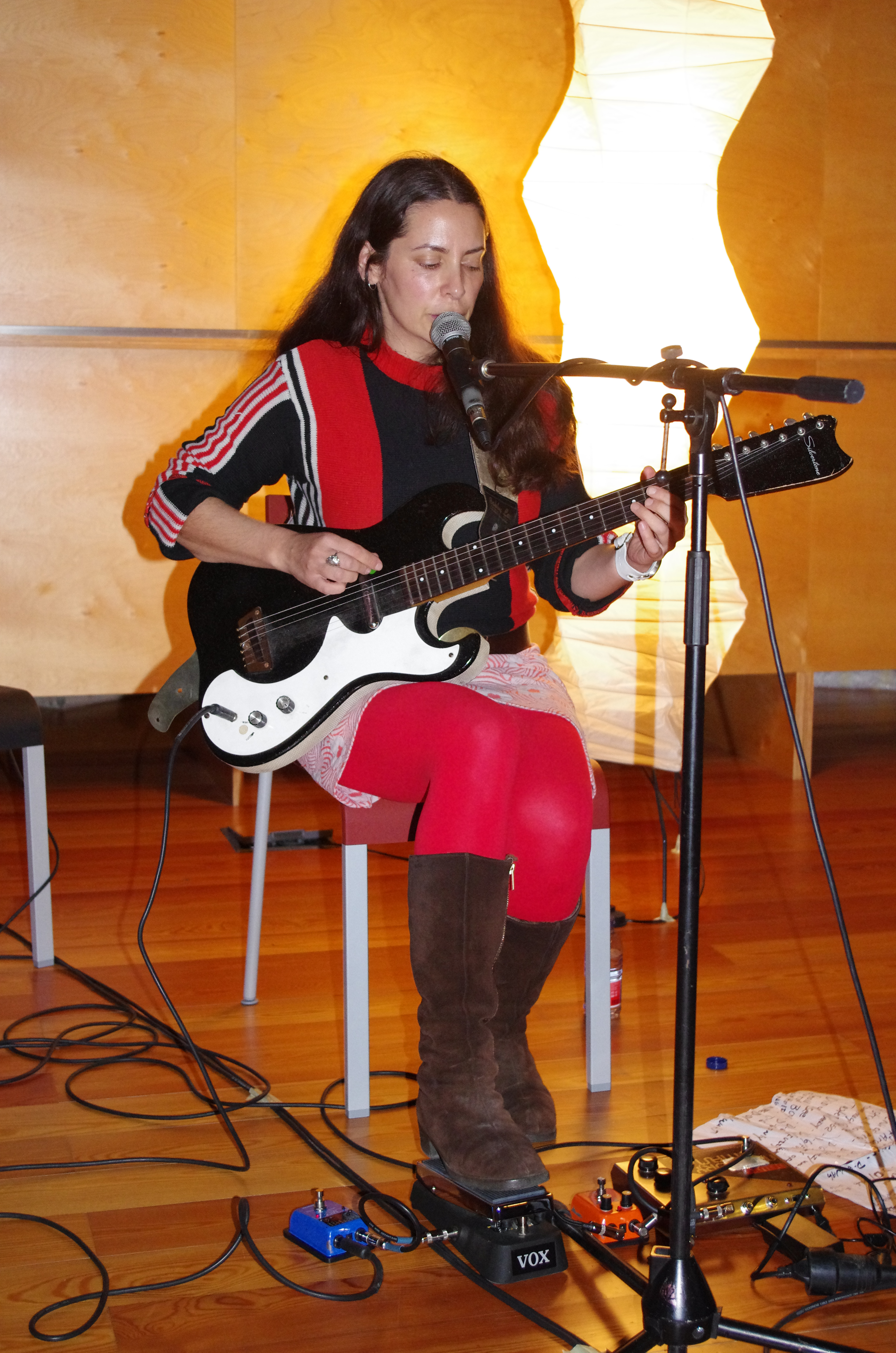
- Lubelski playing at Centro de Artes Visuais in Coimbra, Portugal on February 1, 2013

Background information
- Genres: Indie rock, psych-folk, post-rock, experimental
- Occupations: Musician, composer, engineer
- Instruments: Violin, guitar, bass, vocals
- Labels: The Social Registry, De Stijl, Ecstatic Peace!, Amish, Siltbreeze, Ultra Eczema
- Website: samaralubelski.com

Samara Lubelski is an American singer, violinist, guitarist and bassist. She has been a member of numerous bands, including Of a Mesh, Metabolismus, Salmon Skin, the Sonora Pine, Hall of Fame, the Tower Recordings, MV & EE and the Bummer Road, and Chelsea Light Moving. Since 2003, she has released nine solo studio albums.

Lubelski is a prolific guest musician, performing (predominantly on violin and occasionally on bass) on dozens of recordings by artists such as the Fiery Furnaces, White Magic, Thurston Moore, God Is My Co-Pilot, Jackie-O Motherfucker and Sightings.

As a recording engineer, she has also worked with Double Leopards on Halve Maen (2003, Eclipse Records) and Out of One, Through One and to One (2005, Eclipse); Ted Leo and the Pharmacists on Hearts of Oak (2003, Lookout! Records); Magik Markers on Untitled (2003, self-released), Blues for Randy Sutherland (2004, Arbitrary Signs) and I Trust My Guitar, Etc. (2004, Ecstatic Peace!); the Fiery Furnaces on Blueberry Boat (2004, Rough Trade Records); Sightings on Arrived in Gold (2004, Load Records); Black Dice on Creature Comforts and Miles of Smiles (both 2004, DFA Records); Oneida on Secret Wars (2004, Jagjaguwar) and The Wedding (2005, Jagjaguwar); Mouthus on Saw a Halo (2007, Load Records); and Religious Knives on It's After Dark (2008, Troubleman Unlimited Records).

== Career ==
Lubelski grew up in an artistic community in SoHo, New York, United States. She began her career as a violinist, later on expanding into a multi-instrumentalist playing cello, guitar, bass and mellotron.

Lubelski made her solo debut in 2003 with In the Valley, followed by eight additional full-lengths: The Fleeting Skies in 2004, Spectacular of Passages in 2005, Parallel Suns in 2007, Future Slip in 2009, Wavelength in 2012, String Cycle in 2014, The Gilded Raid in 2016, and Flickers at the Station in 2018.

In 2006, Belgian tape label Sloow Tapes issued a single-sided cassette, Quartet. A live album, Unrock Series – November 19, 2009, was released in 2010. The album Sunday Night, Sunday Afternoon was released as a duo with Marcia Bassett in 2012. A second duo record with Bassett, 110 Livingston St., was released in 2014 on Golden Lab Records. An eponymous album by Augenmusik, an offshoot project of Metabolismus, was released on cassette by Eiderdown in 2015.

== Discography ==
=== Studio albums ===
- In the Valley (2003, Child of Microtones/Eclipse Records)
- The Fleeting Skies (2004, The Social Registry/De Stijl)
- Spectacular of Passages (2005, The Social Registry/De Stijl)
- Parallel Suns (2007, The Social Registry)
- Future Slip (2009, Ecstatic Peace!)
- Wavelength (2012, De Stijl)
- String Cycle (2014, Ultra Eczema)
- The Gilded Raid (2016, Drawing Room Records)
- Flickers at the Station (2018, Drawing Room Records)
- Partial Infinite Sequence (2020, Open Mouth/Relative Pitch Records)

=== Live albums ===
- Unrock Series – November 19, 2009 (2010, Unsound Recordings)

=== Singles ===
- "Did You See?"/"Spectacular of Passages" 7-inch (2009, Time-Lag Records)

=== Cassettes ===
- Quartet single-sided cassette (2006, Sloow Tapes)
- Joy Rides single-sided cassette (2016, Drawing Room Records)

=== EPs with Of a Mesh ===
- Of a Mesh 12-inch EP (1986, Black Afternoon Records)
- Broken 12-inch EP (1987, 109 Records)

=== Albums with Metabolismus ===
- Azzafatazzam (1992, Swamp Room Records)
- Grounded (1994, Swamp Flower Records)
- Terra Incognita (1998, Blackjack Records)
- Anthem of the Moon (1998, Catatonic Records)
- Sprießwärtsdrall (1998, Amish Records)
- SUS (2014, Amish Records)

=== Singles with Metabolismus ===
- "Snowy Meadow"/"Somnia" 7-inch (2008, The Social Registry)

=== EPs with Pacer ===
- Pacer 10-inch EP (1994, Remora/Bear Records)

=== Albums with the Sonora Pine ===
- The Sonora Pine (1996, Quarterstick Records)
- II (1997, Quarterstick Records)

=== Albums with Hall of Fame ===
- Hall of Fame (1996, Amish Recordings)
- First Came Love, Then Came the Tree (1999, Amish Records)
- Hall of Fame (2000, Siltbreeze)
- Paradise Now (2004, The Social Registry)

=== Singles and EPs with Hall of Fame ===
- Coliseum Rising 7-inch EP (1998, Amish Records)
- Split 7-inch with Golden Calves (1999, Polyamory)
- "The Cannibal"/"Superstring Theory" 7-inch (2000, Lal Lal Lal)

=== Albums with the Tower Recordings ===
- The Folk Scene (2001, Shrat Field Recordings)
- The Futuristic Folk of the Tower Recordings Volumes 1 & 2 (2004, Time-Lag Records)
- The Galaxies' Incredibly Sensual Transmission Field of the Tower Recordings (2004, Communion Label)
- Message from the Celestial Explosions (2004, Holoscanner Consciousness)

=== Albums with Metal Mountains ===
- Golden Trees (2011, Amish Records)

=== Albums as Marcia Bassett/Samara Lubelski ===
- Sunday Night, Sunday Afternoon (2012, Kye)
- 110 Livingston St. (2015, Golden Lab Records)
- Live, NYC (2017, Feeding Tube Records)
- Morning Flare Symmetries (2020, Feeding Tube Records)

=== Albums with Chelsea Light Moving ===
- Chelsea Light Moving (2013, Matador Records)

=== Albums with Augenmusik ===
- Augenmusik (2015, Eiderdown Records)

=== Albums with Bill Nace ===
- ′′Samara Lubelski/Bill Nace′′ (2018, Open Mouth/Relative Pitch)
- ′′Live in Belchertown′′ (2019, Open Mouth)
- Live in Brussel (2020, Bergpolder)

=== Guest appearances ===
- Mir Shlufn Nisht by God Is My Co-Pilot (1994, Avant Records) – violin
- Picture Show by Ed Chang & Blindfold (1994, Jiffy Boy Records) – violin
- The Gothic Years and After by Fahrenheit 451 (2000, Cleopatra Records) – violin
- Peregrine by Tara Jane O'Neil (2000, Quarterstick Records) – violin
- In the Sun Lines by Tara Jane O'Neil (2001, Quarterstick Records) – violin
- Space Chanteys by Matt Valentine (2002, Fringes Recordings) – violin, bass
- Blueberry Boat by the Fiery Furnaces (2004, Rough Trade) – violin, engineering, mixing
- Arrived in Gold by Sightings (2004, Load Records) – violin, engineering
- The Cowboy's Road by the Bummer Road (2006, Child of Microtones)
- Deep Space Circuit (live) by the Bummer Road (2006, Child of Microtones) – violin, bass
- Suncatcher Mountain by the Bummer Road (2006, Child of Microtones) – violin, percussion
- America Mystica by Jackie-O Motherfucker (2006, Very Friendly/Dirter Promotions) – violin
- Candyland (live) by Jackie-O Motherfucker (2006, self-released) – violin
- The Long Salt by Mouthus (2006, Important Records) – violin, vocals
- Green Blues by MV & EE with the Bummer Road (2006, Ecstatic Peace!) – violin, bass
- Mother of Thousands by MV & EE with the Bummer Road (2006, Time-Lag Records) – violin, bass
- Dat Rosa Mel Apibus by White Magic (2006, Drag City) – violin
- Gettin' Gone by MV & EE with the Golden Road (2007, Ecstatic Peace!) – bass
- Iron Brew (live) by MV & EE (2007, Heroine Celestial Agriculture)
- Trees Outside the Academy by Thurston Moore (2007, Ecstatic Peace!) – violin
- Total Loss Songs by MV & EE (2008, Three Lobed Recordings) – violin, bass
- Astral Bleachers, Big Moment – Pete's Picks Volume One (live) by MV & EE with the Golden Road (2008, Child of Microtones/Ecstatic Peace!)
- Sniffin' Glue (live) by MV & EE (2008, Heroine Celestial Agriculture) – violin, bass
- Freedom Fries (live) by MV & EE (2008, Heroine Celestial Agriculture) – violin, bass
- Softly Softly Copy Copy by Graham Lambkin (2009, Kye) – violin
- Known Quantity by Willie Lane (2009, Cord-Art, 2009) – bass
- Road Trips by MV & EE (2009, Blackest Rainbow) – violin, bass
- Bollywoe by MV & EE (2010, Child of Microtones) – bass
- In the Sparking Age of the Great White Horse (2010, Arbitrary Signs) by Spectre Folk
- Demolished Thoughts by Thurston Moore (2011, Matador Records) – violin
- The Tingle of Casual Danger by Sunburned Hand of the Man (2012, Manhand) – violin
- Sun Gift Earth cassette by Thurston Moore (2014, Blank Editions) – bass, violin
