= Sensitive/Lethal =

Studio album by Thurston Moore
- Released: April 2008
- Genre: Noise; drone
- Length: 51:58
- Label: No Fun

Thurston Moore chronology
Trees Outside the Academy (2007)	Sensitive/Lethal (2008)	Demolished Thoughts (2011)

Sensitive/Lethal is a studio album by the American musician Thurston Moore, released in April 2008 on the label No Fun Productions. Consisting of three noise compositions, critical reception upon the album's release was varied.

== Background and release ==
Sensitive/Lethal was released on CD in April 2008 by No Fun Productions, a small imprint created by Carlos Giffoni, with whom Moore previously released the collaborative albums Make No Mistake About It (also with David Nyoukis) in 2004 and Four Guitars Live (also with Lee Ranaldo and Nels Cline) in 2006. In place of traditional liner notes, the CD featured a poem that Moore wrote. In May 2008, Moore performed at the Knitting Factory with Nancy Garcia as part of the No Fun Fest, a music festival founded and, for some time, directed by Giffoni.

== Composition ==
Classified as a noise album, Sensitive/Lethal was composed from guitars and electronic equipment that produce drones and oscillations. On the 22-minute-long opener "Sensitive", throughout which Moore slowly strums an acoustic guitar, the noise gradually becomes more atonal as it progresses. The next four minutes, concluding the first half of the album, is "Lonesome", which serves as a guitar-based bridge between the two long-form compositions. The third and final composition, "Lethal", is a series of high-pitched electronics and sharp guitar noises, mostly divided between the left and right audio channels, respectively.

== Critical reception ==
Professional ratings
Review scores
Source	Rating
AllMusic	3.5/5 stars
Pitchfork	2.5/10
Tiny Mix Tapes	3.5/5 stars

Writing for AllMusic, Tim DiGravina said that, overall, Sensitive/Lethal serves as an "interesting, sometimes beautiful, and often difficult and disturbing look into Thurston Moore's painful love affair with the guitar", one that is best listened to for the purposes of "cleansing musical catharsis" rather than entertainment value. On the website Tiny Mix Tapes, Benjamin Bernstein gave it three-and-a-half stars, saying that while Moore demonstrates "a mastery of guitar noise", the album's lack of digestibility "either makes it rewarding or impenetrable, depending on your tastes."

In a review of both the album and Sonic Youth's SYR7: J'Accuse Ted Hughes (2008) for the magazine Plan B, Stevie Chick thought Sensitive/Lethal is "Similarly rewarding for adventurous listeners" and "expertly sculpted, true art from chaos." In contrast, Grayson Haver Currin of Pitchfork called it "an entirely unfocused" record that "lifts weakly from those he long ago inspired", rating it 2.5 out of 10. Currin reserved sole praise for the relatively short "Lonesome", saying it is the one track "worth your time."

== Track listing ==
Sensitive/Lethal track listing
No.	Title	Length
1.	"Sensitive"	21:59
2.	"Lonesome"	3:59
3.	"Lethal"	26:00
Total length:		51:58
