= Alex Ward (musician) =

British clarinetist, guitarist and composer

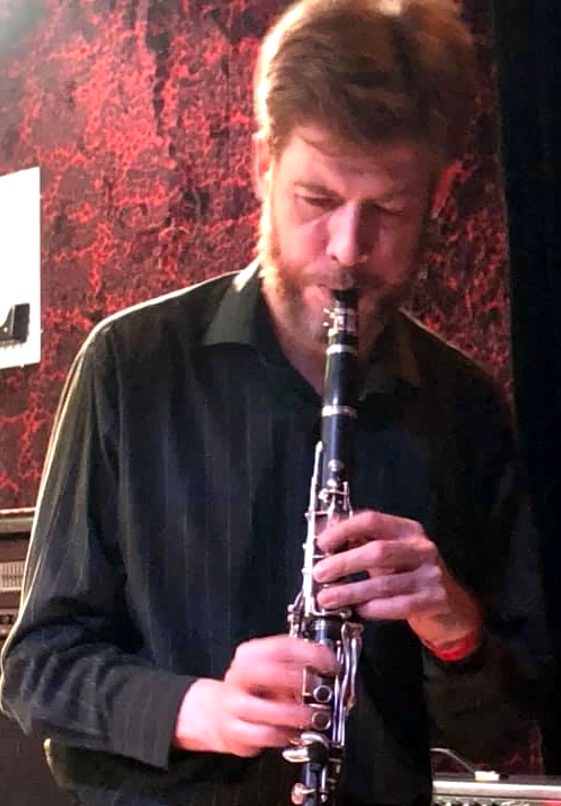
Ward playing clarinet with This Is Not This Heat in Atlanta, 2019.

Alex Ward (born 1974) is a British clarinetist, guitarist and composer. He lives in London.

== Biography ==
Ward was born in Grantham, Lincolnshire and now lives in London.

== Discography ==
- LOCationAL (Incus, 2000) – with Derek Bailey
- Red Kite (Raw Tonk, 2014) – with Colin Webster and Andrew Lisle
- Glass Shelves and Floor by Alex Ward Quintet (Copepod, 2015) – with Olie Brice, Hannah Marshall, Rachel Musson, Julie Kjaer, and Tom Jackson
- Projected / Entities / Removal by Alex Ward Trios & Sextet (Copepod, 2015) – with Olie Brice, Tom Jackson, Rachel Musson, Hannah Marshall, and Steve Noble
- Noonward (Copepod, 2020) – with Sean Noonan
- Volition (Live at Café Oto) by Alex Ward Item 10 (Copepod, 2018)
- (VU) – with Pascal Marzan (Copepod, 2020)
- Frames (Relative Pitch, 2020)
- Where We Were by Alex Ward Item 4 (Relative Pitch, 2020)
- Gated (Discus, 2021)
- Antonyms (Copepod, 2022) – with Dominic Lash
- Furthered by Alex Ward Item 4 (577, 2023)
