= Thurston Moore =

American musician (born 1958)

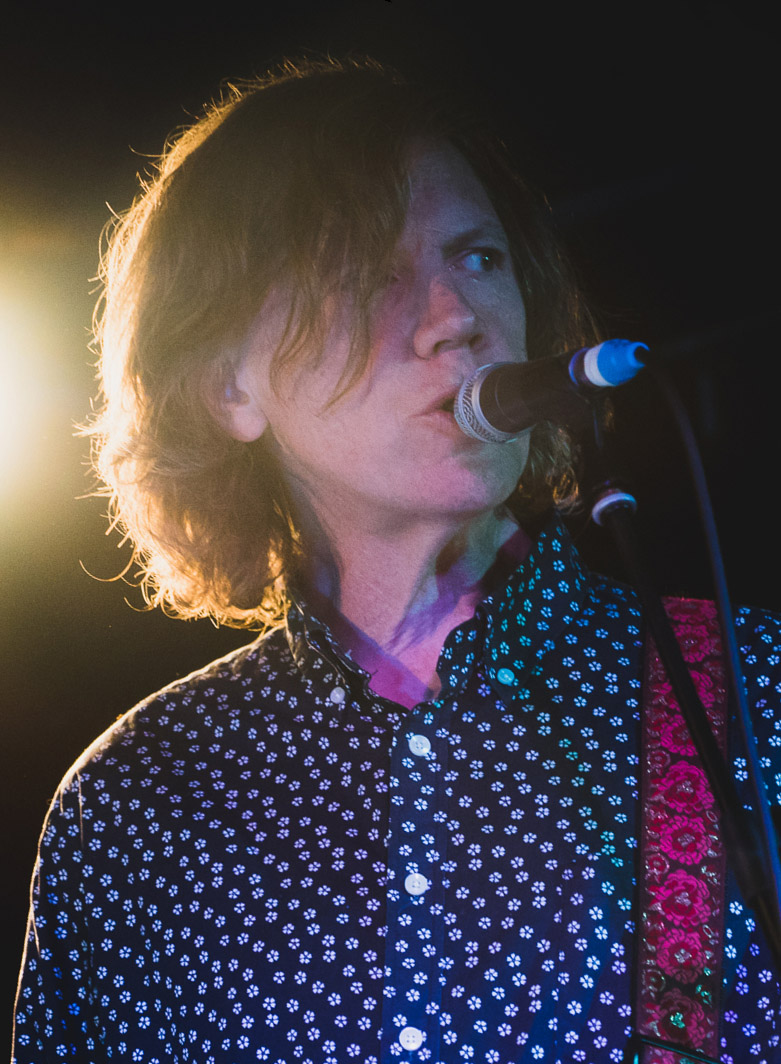
- Moore in 2018

Background information
- Also known as: Mirror; Fred Cracklin
- Born: Thurston Joseph Moore; July 25, 1958 (age 68); Coral Gables, Florida, U.S.
- Genres: Alternative rock; noise rock; avant-rock; post-punk
- Occupations: Musician; songwriter
- Instruments: Guitar; vocals
- Years active: 1976–present
- Labels: Caroline International; Matador; Ecstatic Peace!; DGC; SST
- Formerly of: Sonic Youth; The Coachmen; Swans; Thurston Moore Band; Even Worse; Velvet Monkeys; Dim Stars; Chelsea Light Moving; Twilight
- Spouses: Kim Gordon (m. 1984; div. 2013) Eva Prinz (m. 2020)

Thurston Joseph Moore (born July 25, 1958) is an American musician, best known as guitarist and vocalist of alternative rock band Sonic Youth. He has participated in many solo and group collaborations outside Sonic Youth, as well as running the Ecstatic Peace! record label. Moore was ranked 34th in Rolling Stone's 2004 edition of the "100 Greatest Guitarists of All Time".

In 2012, Moore started a new band Chelsea Light Moving, whose eponymous debut was released on March 5, 2013. In 2015, Chelsea Light Moving disbanded after one studio album release. Moore and the other members of the band continue to make music under his solo project and other bands.

== Early life ==
Moore was born July 25, 1958, at Doctors Hospital in Coral Gables, Florida, to George E. Moore, a professor of music, and Eleanor Nann Moore. In 1967, he and his family (including brother Frederick Eugene Moore, born 1953, and sister Susan Dorothy Moore, born 1956) moved to Bethel, Connecticut. Raised Catholic, he attended St. Joseph's School in Danbury, Connecticut, followed by St. Mary's School in Bethel and attended Bethel High School from 1973 to 1976. In the summer of 1963, he experienced his first exposure to rock music through his brother bringing home the record "Louie Louie" and buying him his first electric guitar.

He enrolled at Western Connecticut State University in fall 1976, but left after one quarter and moved to New York City to join the burgeoning post-punk and no wave music scenes. It was there that he was able to watch shows by the likes of Patti Smith and spoken-word performances by William S. Burroughs. At that time, the arrival of new groups changed his view on music and all of his records "got kind of put into the basement. And they were supplanted by [...] the Sex Pistols and Blondie and Talking Heads and Siouxsie and the Banshees. It was a completely new world, a new identity of music that was an option for youth culture." In 1980, he moved in with Kim Gordon in an apartment below artist Dan Graham, eventually befriending him, sometimes using records from Graham's collection for mix tapes.

Once in the city, Moore was briefly a member of the hardcore punk band Even Worse, featuring future The Big Takeover editor (and future Springhouse drummer) Jack Rabid. After exiting the band, Moore and Lee Ranaldo learned experimental guitar techniques in Glenn Branca's "guitar orchestras". Moore has spoken about influences on his music tastes at this time, including British bands Wire, the Pop Group, the Raincoats, the Slits, and Public Image Ltd ("I used to have these fantasies in the 70s about leaving New York and coming to London to hang out with Public Image").

== Career ==
=== Sonic Youth ===
Moore met Kim Gordon in 1980 at the final gig of the Coachmen, the band he was in with J.D. King, Daniel Walworth (replaced by Dave Keay), and Bob Pullin. Moore, with Gordon, Anne Demarinis and Dave Keay formed a band, appearing under names like Male Bonding, Red Milk, and the Arcadians, before settling on Moore's choice of Sonic Youth just before June 1981. The band played Noise Fest in June 1981 at New York's White Columns gallery, where Lee Ranaldo was playing as a member of Glenn Branca's electric guitar ensemble as well as in duo with David Linton as Avoidance Behavior. Moore invited Ranaldo, who he had known when the Coachmen shared a CBGB stage with Ranaldo's 1970s band the Flux, to join the band. The new trio played three songs at the festival later in the week without a drummer. Each band member took turns playing the drums, until they met drummer Richard Edson. The band signed to Neutral Records, then to Homestead Records, and then to SST Records.

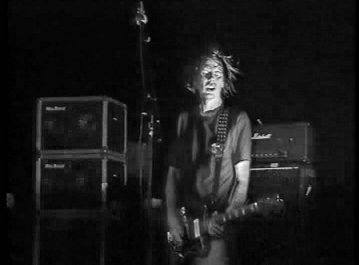
Live in the Netherlands (with Sonic Youth), 1991

Moore and Ranaldo make extensive use of unusual guitar tunings, often heavily modifying their instruments to provide unusual timbres and drones. They are known for bringing upwards of fifty guitars to every gig, using some guitars for one song only. In 2004, Rolling Stone ranked Moore and Ranaldo the 33rd and 34th Greatest Guitarists of All Time.

Thurston Moore has explained the band's decision to sign with DGC Records at a time when many were fiercely dedicated to independent record labels like SST, Dischord and Sub Pop:

We noticed Hüsker Dü's music hadn't changed when they signed to Warner. On the independent labels we dealt with, SST Records, Blast First Records and Neutral Records, if there was accounting, it was always somewhat suspect. With Geffen, we would get an advance that would allow us to be able to pay our rents, get health insurance, have a slightly better lifestyle, and maybe, just maybe, not have to work day jobs. We felt like we could negotiate a contract that would make sense.

When Steve Albini accused corporate labels of ripping off artists, Moore wrote in response that a band "getting butt fucked by corporate labels [must] be really stupid". He defended the band's decision to sign with DGC Records explaining that they knew what they were getting into and viewed it more as "buying in" than "selling out".

In 2011, Moore and his wife, Sonic Youth bassist Kim Gordon, separated; shortly afterward, Sonic Youth went on indefinite hiatus. Though his marriage was ending, Moore never claimed that Sonic Youth was finished.

=== Solo work ===
In addition to his work with Sonic Youth, Moore has also released albums as a solo artist. He and Gordon released a few songs as Mirror/Dash. Moore established Protest Records as an online gesture of activism but the project has since lapsed. Moore has collaborated with scores of musicians, including Maryanne Amacher, Lydia Lunch, Don Dietrich and Jim Sauter of Borbetomagus, DJ Spooky, William Hooker, Daniel Carter, Christian Marclay, Mike Watt, Loren Mazzacane Connors, Dredd Foole, William Winant, the Thing, Nels Cline, Cock E.S.P., John Moloney, Glenn Branca, Yamantaka Eye, Beck, My Cat is an Alien, John Russell, Steve Noble, John Edwards, Haino Keiji, John Zorn, Yoko Ono, Takehisa Kosugi, and others. Moore was a member of the earliest incarnations of Swans in 1982 and 1983, playing bass guitar.

In the early 1990s, Moore formed the side band Dim Stars, with Richard Hell, Don Fleming, Steve Shelley with a guest appearance by Robert Quine. Moore performed solo on the side stage of the 1993 Lollapalooza tour. Additionally, Moore contributed backing vocals to "Crush with Eyeliner", which appeared on R.E.M.'s Monster. He played Fred Cracklin in the Space Ghost Coast to Coast episode dedicated to Sonny Sharrock. In 2000 he contributed improvised guitar pieces for a collaborative project with conceptual artist/guitarist Marco Fusinato. Since 2004, he has recorded and performed with the noise collective To Live and Shave in L.A., the lineup of which also features Andrew W.K. He recorded with the band at Sonic Youth's former studio in Manhattan, and later performed with them at the George W. Bush "anti-inaugural" Noise Against Fascism concert in Washington, D.C., which Moore curated, named in reference to Sonic Youth's 1992 song "Youth Against Fascism". Moore curated the "Nightmare Before Christmas" weekend of the All Tomorrow's Parties music festival in 2006.

In 2007, Moore's label Ecstatic Peace released a solo album titled Trees Outside the Academy. The album was recorded at J Mascis' studio in Amherst, Massachusetts. The album features Sonic Youth drummer Steve Shelley and violinist Samara Lubelski. The album also features collaborations between Mascis and Charalambides' Christina Carter, who performs a duet with Moore on the track, "Honest James".

In 2008, Moore and former Be Your Own Pet vocalist Jemina Pearl recorded a cover of the Ramones song "Sheena Is a Punk Rocker" for the Gossip Girl episode "There Might Be Blood".

Since 2008, Moore has provided narration for a variety of documentaries on the National Geographic Channel. His work includes Inside: Straight Edge and the Hard Time series about life in prison.

In 2012, Moore and Kim Gordon released a collaborative album with Yoko Ono titled Yokokimthurston. Also that year, Moore joined the black metal super group Twilight. He then started a new band called Chelsea Light Moving. Their first track, "Burroughs", was released as a free download. Their eponymous debut album came out in 2013. The release coincided with the SXSW Festival where they made numerous appearances including a free show at Mellow Johnny's bike shop. He played guitar on "This Town Ain't Big Enough for Both of Us" alongside Ron and Russell Mael in a 2013 Sparks concert at the Union Chapel, Islington, London. In 2014, Moore released The Best Day, a solo album featuring Steve Shelley and My Bloody Valentine's Debbie Googe as rhythm section, and James Sedwards on guitar.

In 2018, Moore presented at London's Barbican Centre his work 'Galaxies', an experimental 12-string guitar ensemble. Among the twelve person orchestra were Deb Googe, Jonah Falco, Ray Aggs, Joseph Coward and others. In 2019, Moore released Spirit Counsel, an avant-garde rock three-disc box set. The first track, "Alice Moki Jayne", is a 63-minute long song named for the spouses of John Coltrane, Don Cherry, and Ornette Coleman. The 28-minute "8 Spring Street" is named for the former address of Glenn Branca. The 55-minute final track, "Galaxies (Sky)", was inspired by a poem by Sun Ra.

In 2020, Moore released a solo album entitled By the Fire which featured guitarist James Sedwards and bassist Debbie Googe as on the earlier The Best Days album. In 2021, Moore surprise-released an instrumental album entitled Screen Time.

Moore is an executive producer of the industrial metal opera "Black Lodge" by David T. Little and Anne Waldman featuring Timur and the Dime Museum, in 2023 on Cantaloupe Music.

His most recent album, Flow Critical Lucidity, was released on September 20, 2024.

=== Work on soundtracks ===
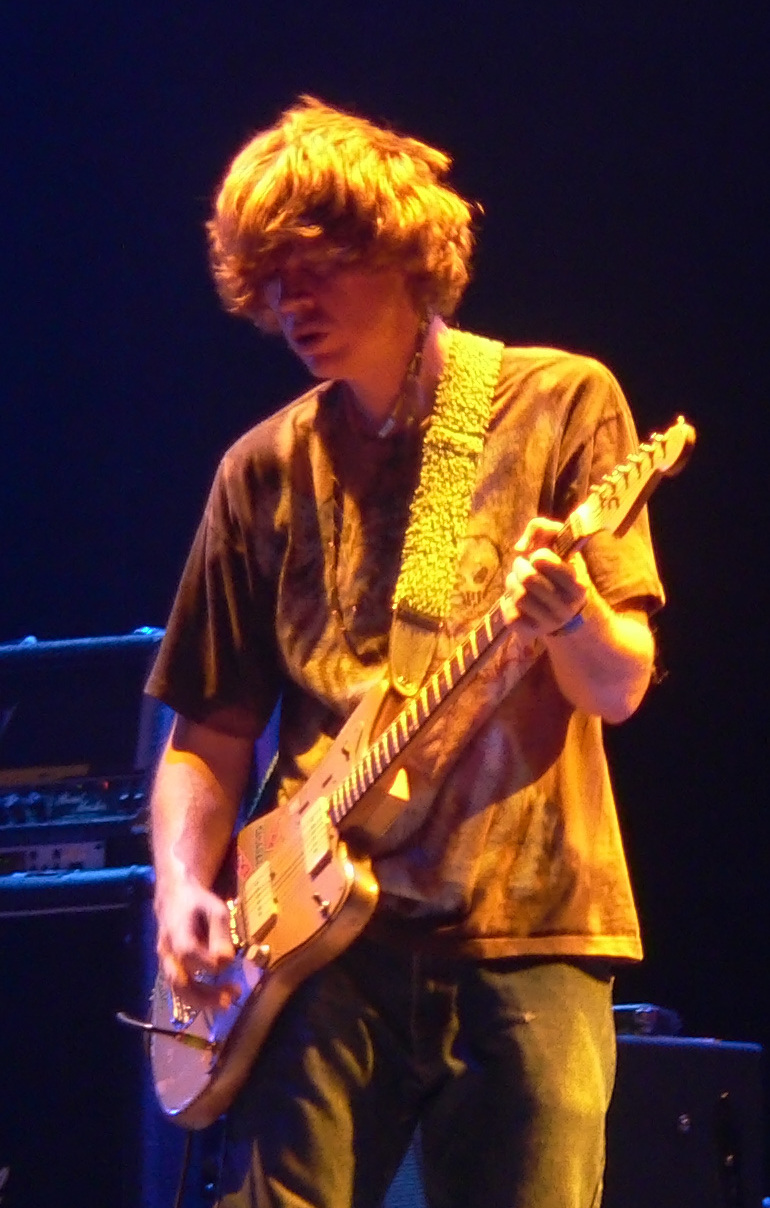
Thurston Moore performing with Sonic Youth at the 2005 Roskilde Festival

In 1994, Moore teamed up with Greg Dulli of the Afghan Whigs, Don Fleming of Gumball, Mike Mills of R.E.M., and Dave Grohl of Nirvana/Foo Fighters, to form the Backbeat Band, which recorded the soundtrack album to the movie Backbeat. In 1998, Moore played on the soundtrack of the film Velvet Goldmine as a member of Wylde Ratttz. Moore composed original music for such films as Heavy (1995), Bully (2001), and Manic (2001). In 2007, Moore also appeared with noise/improv group Original Silence, featuring Norwegian drummer Paal Nilssen-Love, guitarist Terrie Ex, Jim O'Rourke, saxophonist Mats Gustafsson and bassist Massimo Pupillo. The group released the live album The First Original Silence in 2007, on Oslo (Norway) label SmallTown Superjazz, and a second album The Second Original Silence in 2008.

Moore scored the 2022 HBO miniseries Irma Vep.

== Other ventures ==
=== Record label ===
Moore runs the record label Ecstatic Peace! Beginning in 1993, this label jointly released records with rock critic Byron Coley's label, Father Yod, as Ecstatic Yod Records.

=== Writings ===
Moore and other Sonic Youth members published the irreverent music zine called Sonic Death. Moore reviewed new music in Arthur in a column entitled "Bull Tongue" written jointly with Byron Coley. Since the demise of Arthur, Bull Tongue exists as a fanzine edited by Coley and features underground music writing. Moore created, with Chris Habib, the website Protest Records, named for its protest against United States' invasions in the Middle East.

Moore was the editor/overseer of the 2005 book Mix Tape: The Art of Cassette Culture. He published a highly influential list of collectible free jazz records in Grand Royal magazine.

Ecstatic Peace Library is the book publishing company founded by Thurston Moore and visual book editor Eva Prinz in 2010. The company publishes mainly poetry, but also a collection of books about the early Norwegian black metal scene, experimental jazz from the 70s and other niche subjects.

In the fall of 2023, a hardcover memoir written by Moore called Sonic Life: A Memoir was published by Doubleday.

=== Teaching ===
In 2015 Moore was appointed honorary professor at the Rhythmic Music Conservatory (RMC) in Copenhagen, Denmark, where he periodically conducts workshops and master classes.

== Political views ==
Moore is anti-capitalist, and since the 1980s, Moore and his bandmates have been described as anarchists, a label Moore has denied. However, in 2013, he would commend the Occupy Wall Street protests by announcing his support for its anarcho-communist elements.

Since the founding of Sonic Youth, Moore and members of the band have been famously critical of the music industry and what he calls the monopolization of youth culture, with Moore stating in 1991 during filming of The Year Punk Broke,

People see rock and roll as youth culture, and when youth culture becomes monopolized by big business, what are the youth to do? I think we should destroy the bogus capitalist process that is destroying youth culture ...

Since 2004, Moore has participated in a cultural boycott of Israel, likening the country to an apartheid state and criticizing bands like Dinosaur Jr. and Radiohead for performing in the country.

In June 2016, Moore endorsed the candidacy of Bernie Sanders, releasing a track featuring excerpts from Sanders' speeches to coincide along his endorsement.

In November 2019, along with other public figures, Moore signed a letter supporting Labour Party leader Jeremy Corbyn describing him as "a beacon of hope in the struggle against emergent far-right nationalism, xenophobia and racism in much of the democratic world" and endorsed him in the 2019 UK general election.

In October 2022, Moore expressed support for former president Lula in the 2022 Brazilian general election.

== Personal life ==
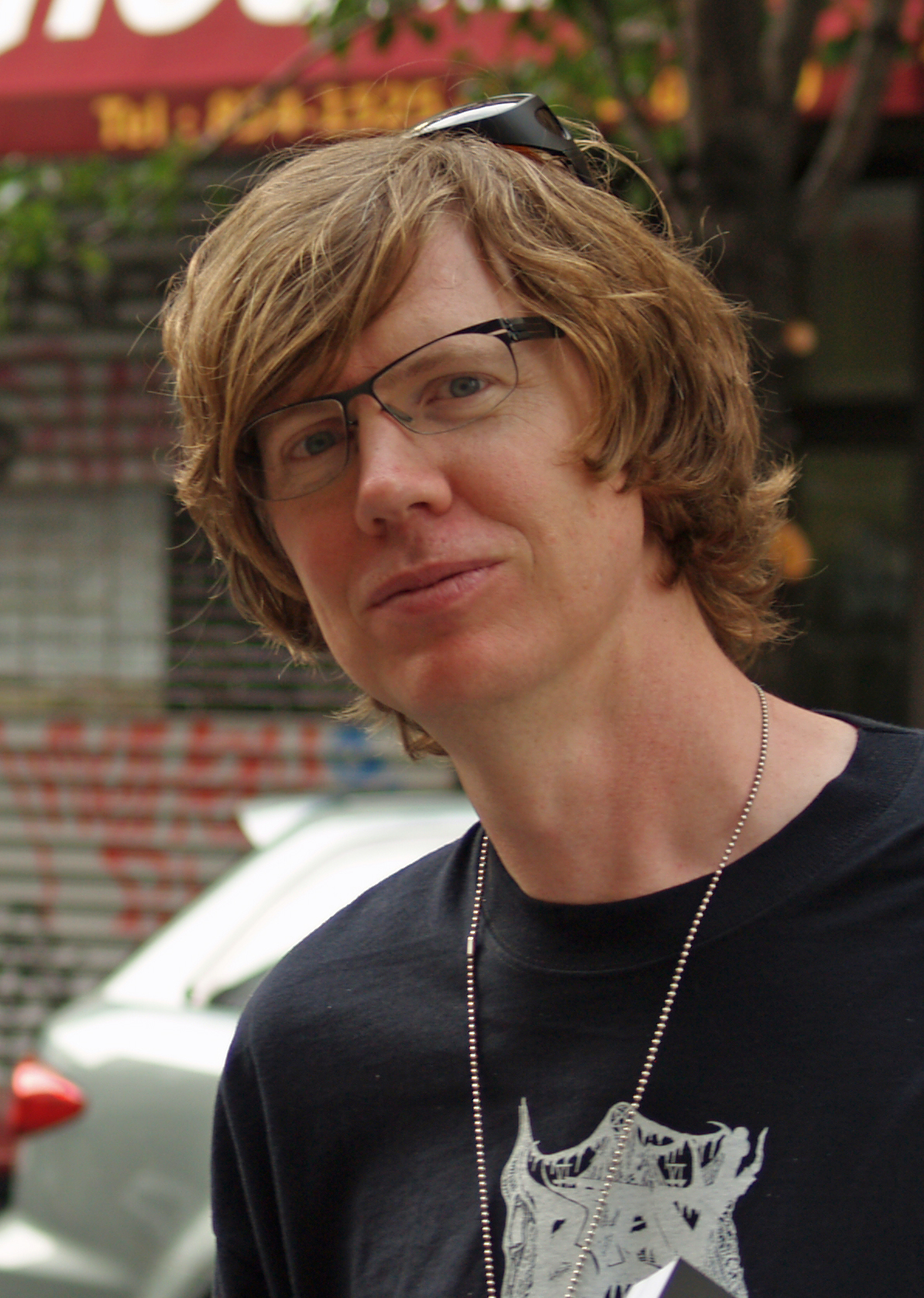
Moore at the Brooklyn Book Festival in 2008

On June 9, 1984, Moore married Sonic Youth bassist/vocalist Kim Gordon. They have a daughter: Coco Hayley Moore (b. July 1, 1994), a fashion model. On October 14, 2011, the couple announced that they were separating due to an extramarital affair Moore engaged in with art book editor Eva Prinz, who was also married at the time. Moore and Gordon divorced in 2013. As of 2017, Moore was residing in Stoke Newington, London, with Prinz. Moore and Prinz were married in late 2020.

Moore released his memoirs, Sonic Life: A Memoir, in October 2023.

== Equipment ==
Moore uses a large selection of Fender guitars during Sonic Youth gigs, most frequently a Jazzmaster. His primary stage amp has been the Peavey Roadmaster paired with a Marshall cabinet. He has used the ProCo Rat, Big Muff, and MXR Blue Box pedals in various combinations to achieve his unique distorted and feedback-laden guitar sound.

Moore is a key figure in the popularization and resurrection of the Fender Jazzmaster. In 2009, Fender introduced a Lee Ranaldo signature edition of a Sapphire Blue Transparent version featuring two Fender Wide Range humbucking pickups and a Forest Green transparent finish for Moore, equipped with a pair of Seymour Duncan Antiquity II Jazzmaster single-coil pickups.

In 2016, Yuri Landman made a special 10-string drone guitar for Moore at the request of Premier Guitar.

== Discography ==
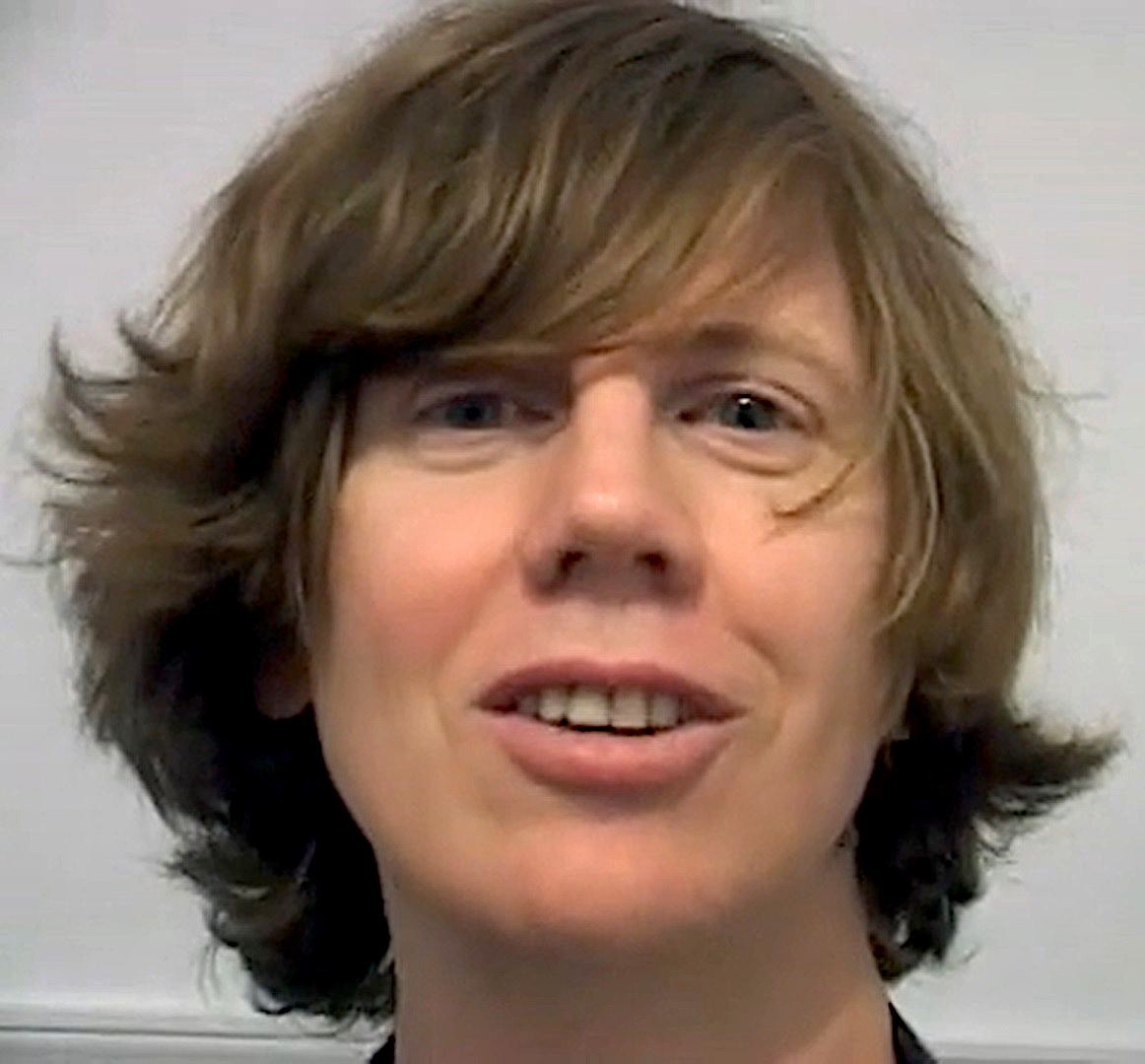
Moore, circa 2004

=== Solo ===
Selected studio albums

- Psychic Hearts (1995)
- Trees Outside the Academy (2007)
- Sensitive/Lethal (2008)
- Demolished Thoughts (2011)
- The Best Day (2014)
- Rock n Roll Consciousness (2017)
- Spirit Counsel (2019)
- By the Fire (2020)
- Screen Time (2021)
- Flow Critical Lucidity (2024)

=== Collaborations ===
Selected studio albums

- Yokokimthurston (with Yoko Ono and Kim Gordon) (2012)
- @ (with John Zorn) (2013)
- Cuts of Guilt, Cuts Deeper (with Merzbow, Balázs Pándi, and Mats Gustafsson) (2015)
- Improvisations (with Charles Hayward) (2017)
- They Came Like Swallows – Seven Requiems for the Children of Gaza (with Bonner Kramer) (2026)

=== As member ===
Sonic Youth / Ciccone Youth

- Sonic Youth (1982)
- Confusion Is Sex (1983)
- Bad Moon Rising (1985)
- EVOL (1986)
- Sister (1987)
- Daydream Nation (1988)
- The Whitey Album (1989)
- Goo (1990)
- Dirty (1992)
- Experimental Jet Set, Trash and No Star (1994)
- Washing Machine (1995)
- A Thousand Leaves (1998)
- NYC Ghosts & Flowers (2000)
- Murray Street (2002)
- Sonic Nurse (2004)
- Rather Ripped (2006)
- The Eternal (2009)

Velvet Monkeys

- Rake (October 1990, Rough Trade)
- "Rock the Nation" b/w "Why Don't We Do It in the Road?" (The Beatles cover) (1991, Sub Pop)

Dim Stars

- Dim Stars (1991, EP, Ecstatic Peace!)
- Dim Stars (June 1992, Caroline/Paperhouse)

Mirror/Dash

- "Electric Pen" / "Gum" (1992, Ecstatic Peace!)
- "Sweetface" / "Rom Supply Co." (with Dan Graham) (2003, En/Of)
- I Can't Be Bought (2006, Three Lobed)
- Noise – "Hotel Athiti" (2006, DVD compilation, MK2)
- Untitled single (2006, AA)
- X Plural U.S. – "Black Metal Boyfriend" (2007, compilation, Mystra)
- "Come Across" (2008, Schunck/Glaspaleis)
- "Blues for Proposition Joe" (Mirror/Dash) / "Sign Stars", "101 on Semlow", "Seychelles" (Kit) (2008, split single, Nothing Fancy Just Music)

Male Slut

- "The Church Should Be for the Outcast, Not a Church That Casts People Out" b/w "Thoodblirsty Thespians" (1995, Stomach Ache)
- Godz Is Not a Put-On – "Quack, I'm a Quack" (1996, compilation, Lissy's)
- Blatant Doom Trip – "Stabbing a Star" (Guided by Voices cover) (1998, tribute album)
- Tracks & Fields – "Industrial Noise Blues" (2004, compilation, Kill Rock Stars)

Foot

- Foot (1998, God Bless)
- Jeg Gleder Meg Til År 2000 – "Armageddon" (Holy Toy cover) (1999, compilation, Universal)
- Live at The Cooler (1999, live, Breathmint)
- This Is NeMocore (with several other musicians) (1999, Instant Mayhem)
- Why Foot? (2021, Glass Modern)

Dapper

- Naked in the Afternoon: A Tribute to Jandek – "Painted My Teeth" (Jandek cover) (2000, Summersteps)
- Dapper (2001, oTo)
- Corona Classic Volume 1 – "Oh You Fine Bird!" (2002, compilation, E.F. Tapes)

Diskaholics Anonymous Trio

- Diskaholics Anonymous Trio (2001, Crazy Wisdom)
- "Yellow Label Silence" / "Come Back Archimedes Bad Car, All Is Forgiven" (2002, no label)
- Weapons of Ass Destruction (2006, recorded 2002, Smalltown Superjazz)
- Live in Japan Vol. 1 (2006, recorded 2002, Load)

To Live and Shave in L.A.

- Noon and Eternity (2006, Menlo Park)
- Horóscopo: Sanatorio de Molière (2006, Blossoming Noise)
- The Grief That Shrieked to Multiply (2013, Monotype)
- Absence Blots Us Out (2015, Blossoming Noise)

The Bark Haze

- LP (2007, live, Important)
- Total Joke Era (2007, Important)
- McCannabis (2007, live, Arbor)
- One for Merz (2008, Three Lobed)
- Basement Psychosis (2008, Ecstatic Peace!)
- Monolith: Jupiter (split album with Traum) (2008, Music Fellowship)
- Wild and Free (2009, not on label)
- "Can We Just Talk Instead?" (The Bark Haze) / "Sadnessfinalamen" (Our Love Will Destroy the World) (2009, split single, Krayon)

Northampton Wools

- Northampton Wools (2007, 100 copies, Bonescraper)
- Valley of Shame (2009, live, Open Mouth)
- Live at All Tomorrow's Parties 2010 (2010, Digital Music Archive)
- Tarp – "Grey Matter Books, April 2010" (with Tarp) (2013, Feeding Tube)

Original Silence

- The First Original Silence (2007, live, Smalltown Superjazzz)
- The Second Original Silence (2008, live, Smalltown Superjazzz)

Caught on Tape

- Caught on Tape (2012, live, Feeding Tube)
- Fundamental Sunshine (2012, live, Manhand)
- Acting the Maggot (2013, live, Feeding Tube)
- Irish-American Prayer (2013, live, Manhand)
- Banjaxed Blues (2013, live, Manhand)
- Full Bleed (February 10, 2015, Northern Spy)
- Parallelogram – "Ono Soul" (split album with Alan Bishop, Bill Orcutt, and Chris Corsano) (2015, Three Lobed)

Chelsea Light Moving

Twilight

- III: Beneath Trident's Tomb (March 17, 2014, Century Media)
- Trident Death Rattle (May 1, 2018, EP, Ascension Monuments Media)

Other groups

- The Coachmen – Failure to Thrive (1988, recorded 1980, New Alliance)
- Swans – Body to Body, Job to Job (1990, compilation, recorded 1982–85, Young God)
- The Backbeat Band – Backbeat (1994, soundtrack, Virgin)
- Society's Ills – Skins, Brains & Guts (7 Seconds cover) (1994, EP, Ecstatic Peace!)
- Puzzled Panthers – Germs (Tribute): A Small Circle of Friends – "Now I Hear the Laughter" (Germs cover) (1996, Grass)
- Rodney & the Tube Tops – "I Hate the 90's" b/w "Tube Tops Forever" and "Cellphone Madness" (1997, Sympathy for the Record Industry)
- Wylde Ratttz – Velvet Goldmine: Music from the Original Motion Picture – "T.V. Eye" (The Stooges cover) (1998, soundtrack, London)
- The Walter Sears – Fringe Benefits (soundtrack to the Walter Sear-produced film of the same name) (1999, Instant Mayhem)
- Dredd Foole and the Din – The Whys of Fire (2003, Ecstatic Peace!/Father Yod)
- Nipple Creek – "New Vietnam Blues" (split single with Can't) (2003, live, U-Sound Archive)
- Dream/Aktion Unit – Blood Shadow Rampage (2006, live, Volcanic Tongue)
- Peeper – Time Machine (2008, Manhand)
- Heretics – Heretics (2016, Unsound)

== Music videos ==
- "Ono Soul" (1995)
- "Circulation" (2011)
- "Speak To The Wild" (2014)
- "Smoke Of Dreams" (2017)
- "Aphrodite" (2017)
- "Cantaloupe" (2020)
- "Isadora" (2023)

== Books ==
- Alabama Wildman (2000)
- Mix Tape: The Art of Cassette Culture (2005)
- Grunge (with Michael Lavine, 2009)
- Punk House: Interiors in Anarchy (with Abby Banks, Timothy Findlen, 2007)
- No Wave: Post-Punk. Underground. New York. 1976–1980. (with Byron Coley, 2008)
- James Hamilton: You Should Have Heard Just What I Seen (with James Hamilton, 2010)
- Lion: Only Noise (And Poems) (2011)
- Sonic Life: A Memoir (2023)
