= The Best Day (Thurston Moore album) =

Studio album by Thurston Moore
- Released: October 20, 2014
- Genre: Alternative rock, noise rock
- Length: 50:22
- Label: Matador
- Producer: Thurston Moore

Thurston Moore chronology
Demolished Thoughts (2011)	The Best Day (2014)	Rock n Roll Consciousness (2017)

Singles from The Best Day
- 1. "Detonation" Released: February 7, 2014

The Best Day is the tenth solo studio album by the American alternative rock musician Thurston Moore, released on October 20, 2014 on Matador Records. The album cover is a photograph of Moore's mother, Eleanor Moore, circa 1940 and a photograph of Moore's parents is used as artwork.

== Release ==
The Best Day was announced for release in March 2014 on Sonic Youth's official news blog. A month prior to its announcement, Moore released "Detonation" as a standalone 7-inch single, backed with "Germs Burn" as its B-side, on the independent English label Blank Editions as part of its Solo Series.

A formal announcement of The Best Day, including cover art, a track listing and release dates, was made on August 20 by Matador Records. The album was released on October 20 in Denmark, France, Sweden and the United Kingdom; October 21 in Spain and the United States; and October 24 in Germany, Ireland, the Netherlands and Switzerland. Officially licensed streams of the album were made available on NPR Music and The Guardian's official web sites a week prior to its international release. The Best Day was issued as a double LP, single CD and as a digital download, with the first 100 U.S. LP pressings featuring an autographed poster.

Professional ratings
Aggregate scores
Source	Rating
Metacritic	75/100
Review scores
Source	Rating
AllMusic	3.5/5 stars
The A.V. Club	B
Consequence of Sound	B−
Cuepoint (Expert Witness)	(2-star Honorable Mention)
The Guardian	4/5 stars
NME	8/10
Pitchfork	7.1/10
PopMatters	7/10
Rolling Stone	3.5/5 stars
Slant Magazine	4/5 stars

== Track listing ==
No.	Title	Length
1.	"Speak to the Wild"	8:30
2.	"Forevermore"	11:15
3.	"Tape"	5:54
4.	"The Best Day"	4:31
5.	"Detonation"	2:56
6.	"Vocabularies"	4:31
7.	"Grace Lake"	6:53
8.	"Germs Burn"	5:52
Total length:		50:22

== Personnel ==
The Thurston Moore Band

- Thurston Moore – vocals, guitar
- James Sedwards – guitar
- Debbie Googe – bass
- Steve Shelley – drums

== Release history ==
Region	Date	Format	Label	Catalog
Denmark	October 20, 2014	2×LP, CD, digital download	Matador	N/A
France	October 20, 2014	2×LP, CD, digital download	Matador	N/A
Sweden	October 20, 2014	2×LP, CD, digital download	Matador	N/A
United Kingdom	October 20, 2014	2×LP, CD, digital download	Matador	N/A
Spain	October 21, 2014	2×LP, CD, digital download	Matador	N/A
United States	October 21, 2014	2×LP, CD, digital download	Matador	N/A
Germany	October 24, 2014	2×LP, CD, digital download	Matador	N/A
Ireland	October 24, 2014	2×LP, CD, digital download	Matador	N/A
Netherlands	October 24, 2014	2×LP, CD, digital download	Matador	N/A
Switzerland	October 24, 2014	2×LP, CD, digital download	Matador	N/A
