= Debbie Googe =

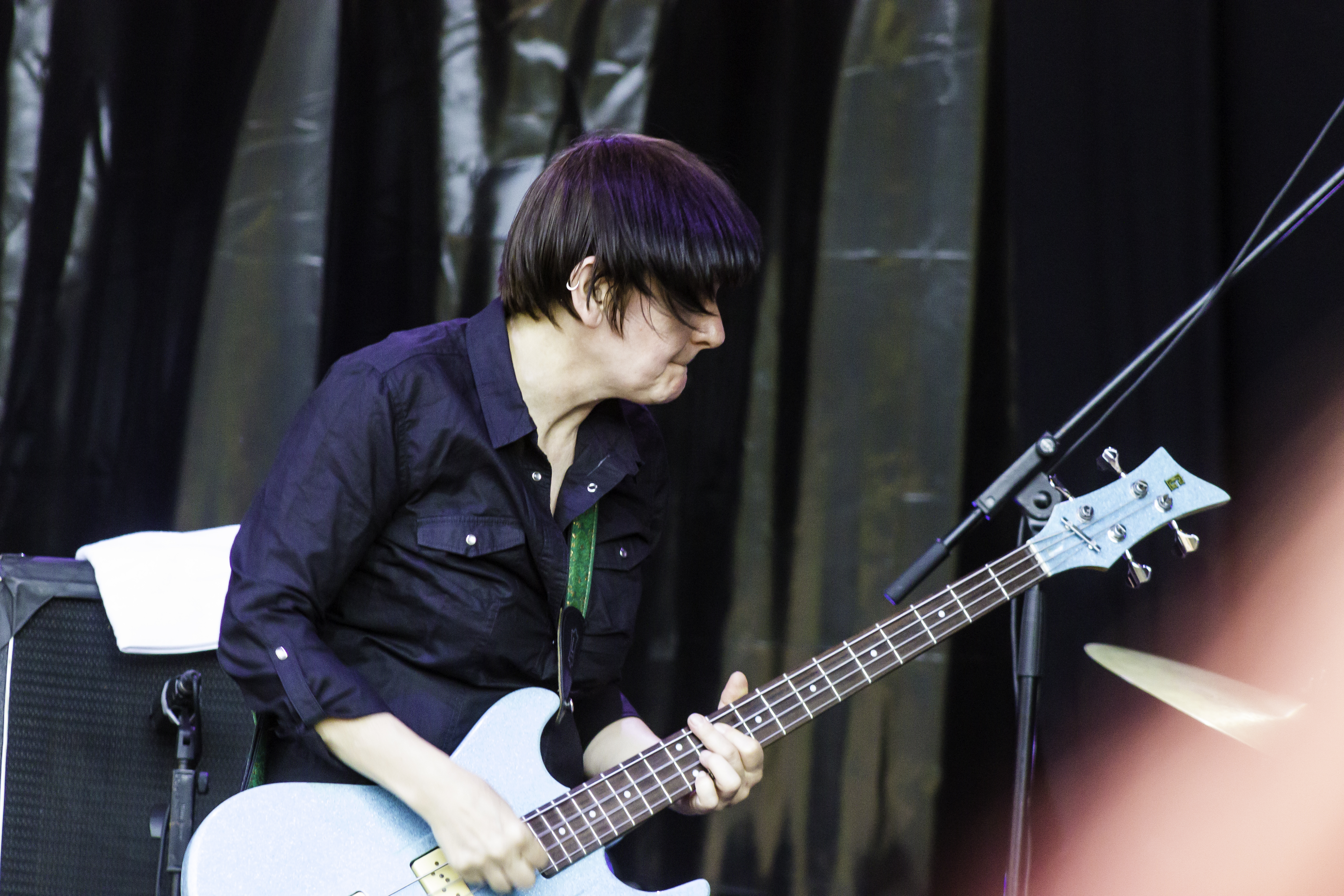
- Googe performing with Thurston Moore in 2015

Background information
- Born: Deborah Ann Googe; 24 October 1962 (age 63); Yeovil, Somerset, England
- Genres: Alternative rock, shoegaze
- Occupation: Musician
- Years active: 1985–present
- Member of: My Bloody Valentine, Thurston Moore Group, Brix Smith, da Googie
- Formerly of: Primal Scream, Snowpony, Bikini Mutants

Deborah Ann Googe (born 24 October 1962) is an English musician who is the bassist for My Bloody Valentine. Their albums Isn't Anything (1988) and Loveless (1991) established Googe as a pioneering figure in the shoegaze genre. She has also worked with Snowpony, Primal Scream, and Thurston Moore.

== Career ==
=== My Bloody Valentine ===
Googe was born in Yeovil, Somerset, England. Prior to joining My Bloody Valentine, she played for a band called Bikini Mutants in her hometown of Yeovil, who gigged with The Mob.

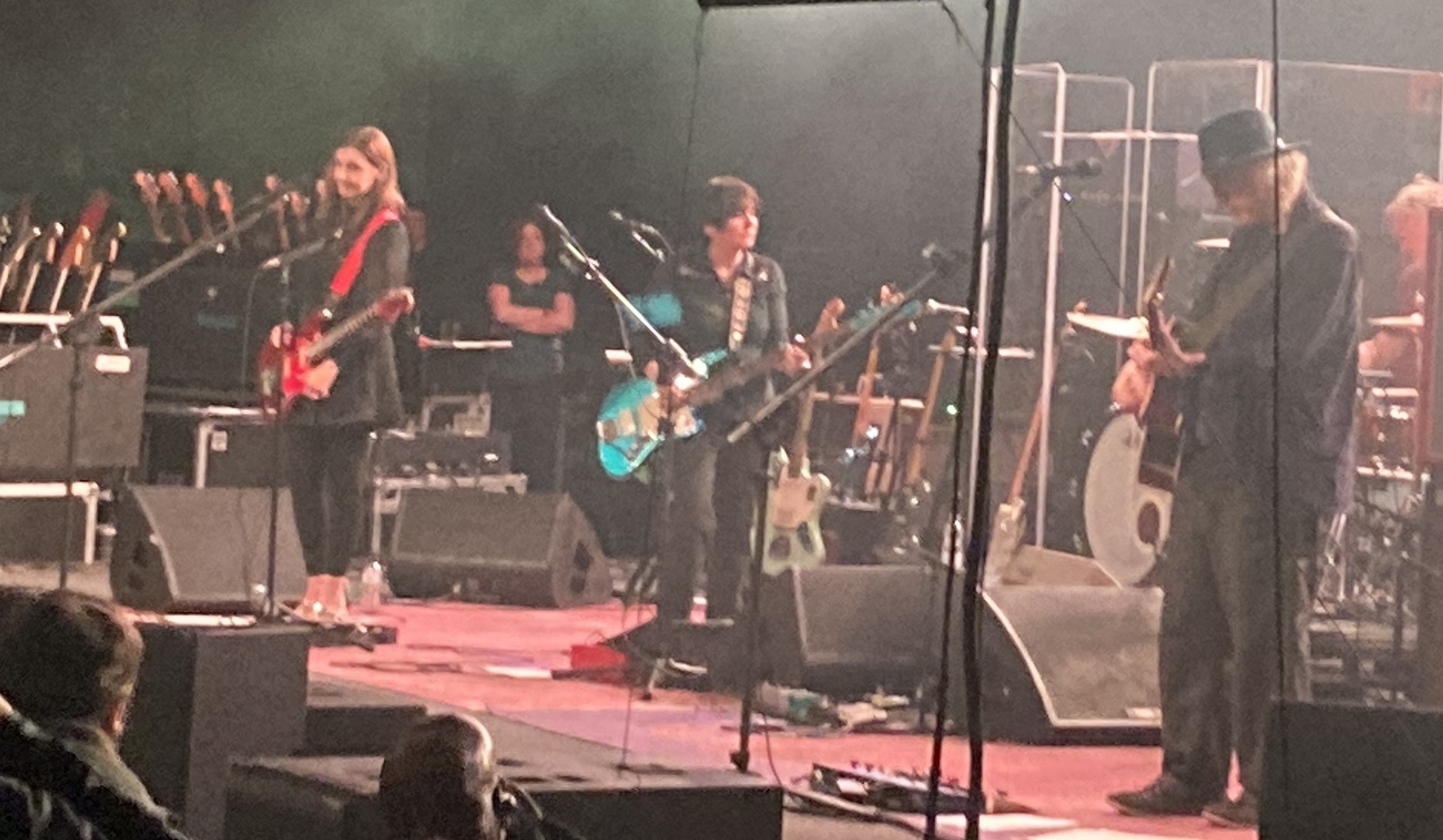
Googe (center) playing live with MBV, Dublin 2025

She moved from Yeovil to London, and in early 1985 an ex-girlfriend of hers recommended her as a bass player to Kevin Shields and Colm Ó Cíosóig of My Bloody Valentine. She joined the band after an audition in April 1985. She left the group in 1996, noting she "hadn't been happy for a long time".

Googe is known for her energetic style of bass playing during MBV's live performances. She rejoined My Bloody Valentine in 2007 for the reunion tour and has remained with them since, playing with them on all of their subsequent tours.

=== Other work ===
After leaving MBV in 1995, Googe briefly became a taxi driver. She formed Snowpony in 1996 with her then-girlfriend, Katharine Gifford, formerly of Stereolab. They released three albums and four EPs between 1997 and 2003. She occasionally plays keyboards with the massed fuzz organ experimentalists band Pimmel and also plays drums and sings backing vocals for Rockhard.

She joined Primal Scream for their 2012 tour after Mani joined the reformed The Stone Roses. This included the Australian leg of the tour.

In 2014, she joined Thurston Moore for his solo project The Best Day, and continued this collaboration with his subsequent albums Rock n Roll Consciousness in 2017 and By the Fire in 2020, alongside Steve Shelley and the UK musician James Sedwards.

She contributed bass for two tracks on the 2018 Tim Burgess album As I Was Now and collaborated with the American poet Ann Waldman for the 2020 album Sciamachy, along with William Parker and Laurie Anderson. In November 2023, Googe announced a new solo project under the name da Googie. She released a split 12" record with the duo Too Many Things on one side and three da Googie tracks: Slither/ Pipe Dreams/ November New, on the other side.
