= James Sedwards =

English guitarist and musician

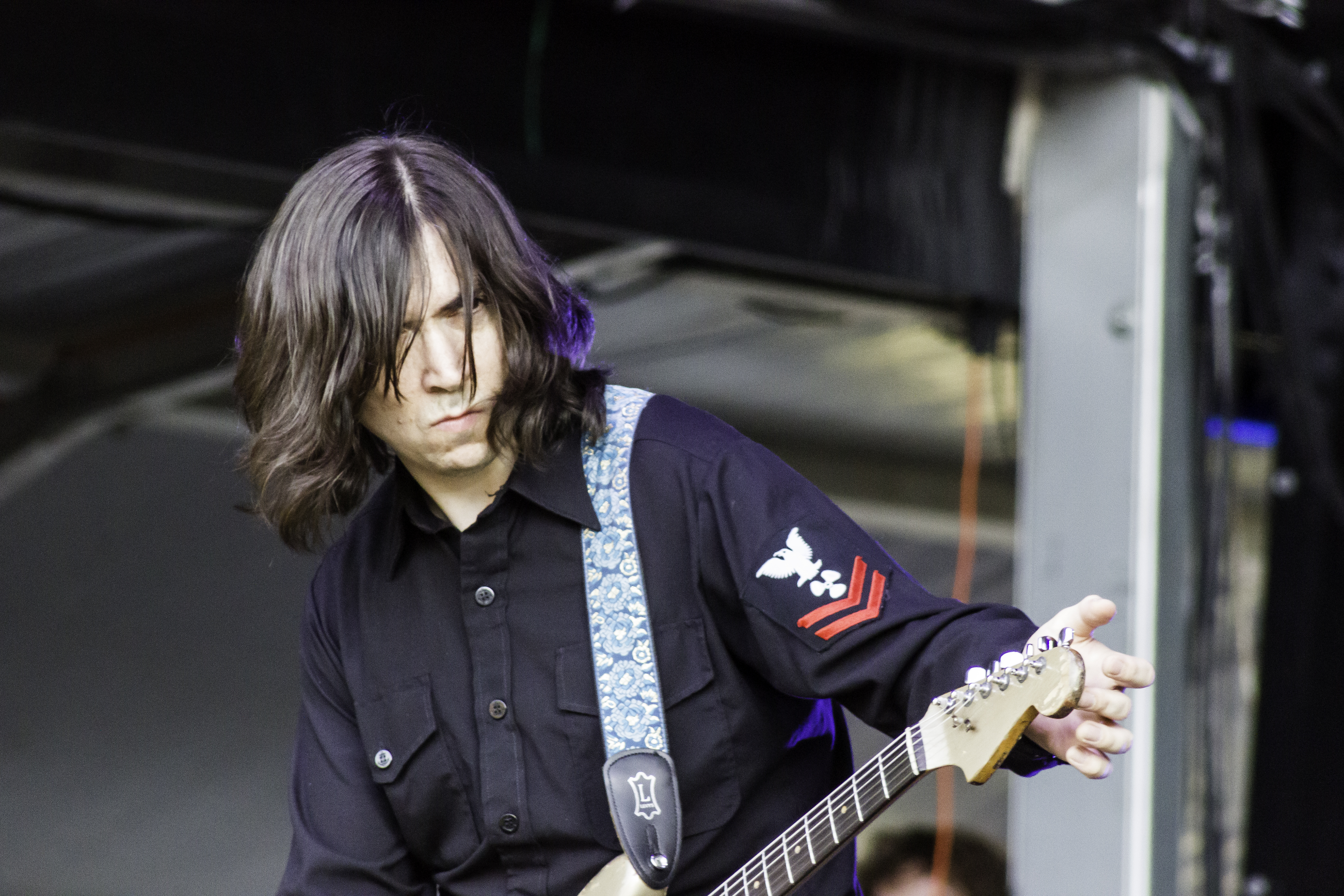
Sedwards performing in 2015 with Thurston Moore.

James Sedwards is an English guitarist, musician, and composer, working predominantly in noise rock, alternative rock and experimental music.

Initially known for forming and leading the band Nought (or "Nøught"), he has more recently been known as a collaborative musician on projects including Guapo, The Devil (with members of Country Teasers), Kish Mauve, Alex Ward & The Dead Ends, Zodiac Youth (with Youth and Zodiac Mindwarp), and Chrome Hoof. Sedwards also has ongoing improvisation duo work with drummer Jem Doulton and was a live member of the reunited This Heat (playing under the name This Is Not This Heat) from 2016 until 2019.

Sedwards is an original member of the Thurston Moore Group, alongside Moore, My Bloody Valentine's Deb Googe (on bass) and Sonic Youth's Steve Shelley (on drums), playing on all their albums, from The Best Day (2014) onwards.

Sedwards is noted for his guitar skills, having been a runner-up at the 1998 Guitarist of the Year competition held at the Wembley Conference Centre (now Wembley Arena) with the judges finding his composition and performance of the piece 'Cough Cap Kitty Cat' the "perfect blend of technical expertise and inventiveness." He also came in 2nd place in the first UK Riffathon in 2003, a nationwide guitar competition in aid of Action For Brazil's Children Trust and judged by Jimmy Page and Brian May, where he played the 1973 live version of Led Zeppelin's 'Immigrant Song'.

On many of his projects, Sedwards plays bass guitar in addition to (or instead of) six-string guitar. He has also occasionally played his guitar with a power drill. John Peel once said that Sedwards is "the first person who's not a footballer that I've been jealous of."
