= Soon (My Bloody Valentine song) =

1990 single by My Bloody Valentine

Single by My Bloody Valentine

from the EP Glider and the album Loveless
- Released: 23 April 1990
- Genre: Shoegaze; alternative dance
- Length: 7:00
- Label: Creation
- Songwriter: Kevin Shields
- Producer: My Bloody Valentine

My Bloody Valentine singles chronology
"Sugar" (1989)	"Soon" (1990)	"To Here Knows When" (1991)

Music video
- "Soon" on YouTube

"Soon" is a song by the Irish rock band My Bloody Valentine and the first track on their fifth extended play, Glider (1990). It was released on 23 April 1990 by Creation Records. An alternate mix was used as the closing track on the band's second studio album, Loveless (1991).

== Background ==
My Bloody Valentine achieved mainstream success with their debut studio album, Isn't Anything, released in 1988 by Creation Records. They began work on a second album in 1989, resulting in unproductive months of recording across 19 different studios. Due to the extensive production time, guitarist Kevin Shields and Creation executive Alan McGee agreed to release extended plays ahead of the album. Shields and engineer Harold Burgon then spent three weeks at the Woodcray studio in Berkshire working on the Glider EP, which produced the song "Soon".

== Composition ==
"Soon"
"Soon" features a dance-oriented, swingbeat-influenced beat behind three tracks of Shields' "glide guitar" playing.

"Soon" is a dance anthem, which has been categorized as a shoegaze and alternative dance song with a runtime of seven minutes. Written by Shields with characteristically obscure lyrics, the song distinguishes itself from the band's previous output with a dance-oriented and deliberately "sampled" sound. It prominently features Shields's glide guitar technique. In an interview, Shields said:

I was hearing really cool music made by hip-hop groups that were sampling stuff... [T]he whole thing about sampling back in those days is that people really started to mess with the key... I was hearing a lot of music that you just didn’t really know what was creating that sound.

== Release and reception ==
"Soon" was released in April 1990 as part of the Glider EP, with the title track as its B-side. Distribution in the United Kingdom was handled by Creation, while Sire Records shipped units in the United States. A music video for the song was filmed by Angus Cameron. It debuted the UK singles chart on 5 May 1990 at number 41, their second highest entry on the chart, and remained there for three weeks. "Soon" was also released on 4 November 1991 on the band's second studio album, Loveless, as the closing track.

"Soon" received generally positive reviews from music critics, with AllMusic's Stephen Thomas Erlewine calling it "one of the group's greatest sound paintings, filled with evocative textures and eerie, disembodied rhythms". Musician Brian Eno famously said upon release that "Soon" "set a new standard for pop. It's the vaguest music ever to have been a hit." After "Soon" appeared on the compilation EP's 1988–1991, Dom Gourlay of Drowned in Sound wrote, "...its dizzying rush of layered guitars, processed beats and breathy vocal retorts make "Soon" one of the most progressive pieces of music to emerge from the acid house scene. Even now its luscious tones remain as captivating as on first listen in the spring of 1990." Guitarist Ken Andrews cited the song as an influence on his band Failure, writing: "My Bloody Valentine were such pioneers, and this song is quite dancey and pop. It's so rhythmically orientated as well, and that was the other thing that I found to be really inspiring about them: they didn't lock themselves into a specific formula of how to write and present songs." Alexis Petridis of The Guardian rated "Soon" as the band's third-best song, calling its sound "funkier than the era’s standard-issue baggy breakbeat, the song structure cyclical and hypnotic."

== Personnel ==
Credits are adapted from the liner notes of Glider and Loveless.

My Bloody Valentine

- Colm Ó Cíosóig – drums, sampler, production, engineering
- Bilinda Butcher – vocals, production; guitar (credited, does not perform)
- Debbie Googe – production; bass (credited, does not perform)
- Kevin Shields – guitar, vocals, sampler, production, engineering; bass (uncredited)

Additional personnel

- Alan Moulder – engineering
- Harold Burgon – engineering

== Charts ==
Chart performance for "Soon"
Chart (1990)	Peak position
UK Singles (OCC)	41
