= To Here Knows When =

1991 single by My Bloody Valentine

Single by My Bloody Valentine

from the album Loveless and the EP Tremolo
- B-side: "Swallow"
- Released: February 4, 1991
- Genre: Shoegaze; noise rock; experimental rock
- Length: 4:44 (Single Edit); 5:49 (EP Version); 5:31 (Album Version)
- Label: Creation (UK): Sire; Warner Bros. (US)
- Composer: Kevin Shields
- Lyricists: Bilinda Butcher; Kevin Shields
- Producers: My Bloody Valentine (EP); Kevin Shields (Album)

My Bloody Valentine singles chronology
"Soon" (1990)	"To Here Knows When" (1991)	"When You Sleep" (1991)

"To Here Knows When" is a song by the Irish rock band My Bloody Valentine. It was released by Creation as the lead single from their sixth EP, Tremolo, in February 1991. A different mix appears on their second studio album, Loveless, which features an alternate ending. It was written by Bilinda Butcher and Kevin Shields, and produced by the band.

== Background ==
My Bloody Valentine broke into the mainstream with their 1988 debut studio album, Isn't Anything, released under the Creation Records label. Early in 1989, they began work on their second album, Loveless (1991), which resulted in unproductive months during which the band relocated to 19 different studios. Due to its extensive production time, Kevin Shields and Creation executive Alan McGee agreed to release two extended plays: Glider (1990) and Tremolo (1991). The latter spawned "To Here Knows When", recorded also in 1991.

== Composition ==
Written by Shields and Bilinda Butcher, "To Here Knows When" is a shoegaze song characterized by heavy effects usage and Shields's distinct glide guitar playing. In place of a usual bass track, a BBC Radiophonic Workshop record featuring sounds of "a disaster in the distance" and "a nuclear bomb going off" was looped. As Colm Ó Cíosóig was physically ill and could not perform, a drum machine with delay was used for both versions, which utilized samples from his kit. Two versions of the song appear on Tremolo and Loveless, with its coda being the differentiating factor.

== Release and reception ==
"To Here Knows When" was released on the Tremolo EP in February 1991, with "Swallow" on its B-side. A music video for the song was filmed by Angus Cameron. Upon release, it peaked at number 29 on the UK singles chart, which is their highest entry to date and their only top 40 single. In 1991, NME's Dave Fedele called "To Here Knows When" the "strangest single" to ever appear on the UK singles chart.

In a 2008 article on the "weirdest" UK chart hits, Paul Lester of The Guardian describes the song as a notable "how did that get there?!" moment of the 1990s, writing that both it and Underworld's "Born Slippy .NUXX" (1996) "saw strange dance sounds high in the charts". In 2023, The Guardian's Alexis Petridis ranked it as the band's best song, calling it "strange and strangely beautiful, the rule-breaking musical equivalent of a waking dream. Thirty-two years on, it’s still baffling, magical and unique."

== Personnel ==
All personnel credits adapted from Loveless's liner notes.

My Bloody Valentine

- Colm Ó Cíosóig – drums, sampler
- Bilinda Butcher – vocals; guitar (credited, does not perform)
- Debbie Googe – bass (credited, does not perform)
- Kevin Shields – guitar, vocals, sampler; bass (uncredited)

== Charts ==
Chart performance for "To Here Knows When"
Chart (1991)	Peak position
UK Singles (OCC)	29
