= EP's 1988–1991 =

Compilation album by My Bloody Valentine
- Released: 4 May 2012
- Recorded: 1988–1991
- Genre: Shoegaze
- Length: 101:23
- Labels: Sony; Domino
- Producer: My Bloody Valentine
- Compiler: Kevin Shields

My Bloody Valentine chronology
Loveless (1991)	EP's 1988–1991 (2012)	m b v (2013)

EP's 1988–1991 (also referred to as EP's 1988–1991 and Rare Tracks and stylised in lowercase) is a compilation album by Irish shoegaze band My Bloody Valentine, released on 4 May 2012 via Sony. It features four of the band's extended plays for Creation Records—You Made Me Realise (1988), Feed Me with Your Kiss (1988), Glider (1990) and Tremolo (1991)—and seven additional rare and unreleased songs.

Compiled and remastered by the band's vocalist and guitarist Kevin Shields, EP's 1988–1991 was released as a two-disc CD set alongside remastered versions of My Bloody Valentine's two original studio albums, Isn't Anything (1988) and Loveless (1991). Upon its release, the compilation received positive reviews from music critics and placed in several international charts, including Ireland, the United Kingdom, Belgium, South Korea and Japan.

== Background ==
Rumours of a My Bloody Valentine box set circulated amongst the general public in April 2008. Following a listing on HMV Japan's web site, media sources reported that a five-disc limited edition box set containing remastered versions of Isn't Anything (1988), Loveless (1991), a compilation of the band's EPs, a compilation of unreleased songs and a DVD were due to be released on 25 June 2008. A listing was also made available on Amazon UK, under the title Complete Box with an expected release date of 7 July 2008. In an article published in The Guardian in May 2008, Sean O'Hagan, a close friend of My Bloody Valentine's vocalist and guitarist Kevin Shields, commented on the rumours, saying: "a representative from Sony (who now possess the band's back catalogue) emailed to ask if I would write the sleevenotes for a very imminent My Bloody Valentine box set featuring Shields's remastered versions of Isn't Anything and Loveless, as well as all the songs that appeared on their now hard-to-find EPs and several unreleased tracks. An interview was scheduled for the following week as soon as Shields had approved the CD artwork. In the meantime, the release of the box set has been postponed indefinitely." Promotional copies of partially remastered editions of Isn't Anything and Loveless were leaked in June 2008 although neither compilations mentioned by O'Hagan or other media sources were released.

== Release ==
EP's 1988–1991 was announced for release on 23 March 2012 through an official press release by Sony Music Ireland. The album was released in Ireland on 4 May 2012, and three days later in the United Kingdom, on CD and made available as a digital download from various online retailers. A CD-only version of the album was released in Japan on 12 June. Kevin Shields mentioned in an interview with Pitchfork Media that LP versions of the album are due "probably in a few months."

EP's 1988–1991 charted in four countries upon its release. The album debuted, and peaked, at number 21 on the Irish Albums Chart, falling to number 68 in its second week. The album also debuted at number 33 on the UK Albums Chart, number 192 on the Belgian Albums Chart in Flanders, number 189 on the Belgian Albums Chart in Wallonia, number 69 on the Gaon Albums Chart in South Korea, and number 17 on the Oricon Albums Chart in Japan.

== Reception ==
Professional ratings
Review scores
Source	Rating
AllMusic	4/5 stars
Beats Per Minute	85%
Drowned in Sound	9/10
The Irish Times	4/5 stars
OndaRock	8.5/10
Pitchfork	9.5/10
Record Collector	5/5 stars
Rolling Stone	3.5/5 stars
Sputnikmusic	4.5/5 stars
State	10/10

EP's 1988–1991 has received positive reviews. AllMusic rated the album four out of five stars. Drowned in Sound reviewer Dom Gourlay awarded the album a 9 out of 10 rating and said "although marginally falling short of perfection as a complete package, [the album] is a fascinating collection detailing the unassailable rise of arguably the most influential guitar band this past quarter of a century." Writing for The Irish Times, Tony Clayton-Lea said the release, along with Isn't Anything and Loveless, "highlight once again how traditional musical structures can be subverted and inverted to the point where it's simultaneously familiar and comforting, yet odd and uneasy," awarding it four out of five stars. Mic Wright of musicOMH noted that "for anyone who has been mesmerised by the power, beauty and oddness of MBV, it's yet another opportunity to get obsessed," describing the album as "the sound of sweet sedation, like being serenaded by angels as you come out from under a general anaesthetic." Pitchork editor Mark Richardson awarded the album a rare 9.5/10 rating and referred to the album—along with Isn't Anything and Loveless—as the "best new reissue". Richardson selected the "crunchy pop tunes at the tail end of the disc" as the highlights of the album, noting that the songs "complement to the superior material on the EPs." RTÉ's entertainment network, RTÉ Ten, referred to EP's 1988–1991 as "the real treasures in these re-releases" and called it "a cause for celebration." State magazine awarded the album a full ten out of ten rating and praised the collection of EPs individually, calling You Made Me Realise "a massive step-up" from their previous material and the preceding Loveless EPs as "similarly revelatory". Domino rereleased the collection in 2021, and two unlisted tracks were appended to the second disc: A remix of Don't Ask Why (originally from the Glider EP in original mix) and an unreleased track from one of the two 1989 unreleased EPs probably named What Can You See. (Ref: https://m.youtube.com/watch?v=MdhGlxl4tAs#bottom-sheet)

== Track listing ==
All tracks are written by Kevin Shields unless otherwise noted.

Disc one
No.	Title	Writer(s)	Source	Length
1.	"You Made Me Realise"		You Made Me Realise (1988)	3:47
2.	"Slow"		You Made Me Realise	3:12
3.	"Thorn"		You Made Me Realise	3:37
4.	"Cigarette in Your Bed"		You Made Me Realise	3:30
5.	"Drive It All Over Me"	Shields, Bilinda Butcher, Colm Ó Cíosóig	You Made Me Realise	3:06
6.	"Feed Me with Your Kiss"		Feed Me with Your Kiss (1988)	3:57
7.	"I Believe"		Feed Me with Your Kiss	3:02
8.	"Emptiness Inside"		Feed Me with Your Kiss	2:50
9.	"I Need No Trust"		Feed Me with Your Kiss	3:37
10.	"Soon"		Glider (1990)	6:59
11.	"Glider"		Glider	3:11
12.	"Don't Ask Why"		Glider	4:03
13.	"Off Your Face"	Shields, Butcher	Glider	4:16
Total length:				49:12

Disc two
No.	Title	Writer(s)	Source	Length
1.	"To Here Knows When"	Shields, Butcher	Tremolo (1991); sourced from a 2006 DAT	5:49
2.	"Swallow"		Tremolo	4:53
3.	"Honey Power"	Butcher	Tremolo	4:33
4.	"Moon Song"		Tremolo	3:28
5.	"Instrumental No 2"		Isn't Anything bonus 7-inch single "Instrumental" (1988)	4:44
6.	"Instrumental No 1"		Isn't Anything bonus 7-inch single "Instrumental"	3:22
7.	"Glider (Full Length Version)"		Glider E.P. Remixes (1990)	10:15
8.	"Sugar"		Split 7-inch flexi-disc with Pacific (1989)	4:16
9.	"Angel"		Previously unreleased	4:42
10.	"Good for You"		Previously unreleased	2:31
11.	"How Do You Do It"		Previously unreleased	3:32
Total length:				52:11

Notes

- In some releases, every song is stylized in all lowercase.

== Personnel ==
My Bloody Valentine

- Kevin Shields – vocals, guitar, sampler
- Bilinda Butcher – vocals, guitar
- Debbie Googe – bass guitar
- Colm Ó Cíosóig – drums, percussion, sampler

Technical personnel

- My Bloody Valentine – production, mixing
- Kevin Shields – remastering
- Dave Anderson – engineer (disc one: 6–9, disc two: 5–6)
- Steve Nunn – engineer (disc one: 6–9, disc two: 5–6)
- Alex Russell – engineer (disc one: 6–9, disc two: 5–6)
- Alan Moulder – engineer (disc one: 10–12, disc two: 1–4)

== Chart positions ==
Chart (2012)	Peak position
Belgian Albums Chart (Flanders)	192
Belgian Albums Chart (Wallonia)	189
Irish Albums Chart	21
Japanese Oricon Albums Chart	17
South Korean Gaon Albums Chart	69
UK Albums Chart	33

== Release history ==
Region	Date	Format	Label	Catalog
Ireland	4 May 2012	2×CD, digital download	Sony Music Entertainment	88691941692
United Kingdom	7 May 2012	2×CD, digital download	Sony Music Entertainment	88691941692
Japan	12 June 2012	2×CD	Sony Music Entertainment	SICP20382
