= Instrumental (My Bloody Valentine song) =

Song by Irish alternative rock band My Bloody Valentine

Single by My Bloody Valentine
- B-side: "Instrumental" ("Instrumental No 2")
- Released: November 1988
- Recorded: 1988 at Foel Studio in Llanfair Caereinion, Wales
- Genre: Alternative rock, electronic
- Length: 3:22
- Label: Creation
- Songwriter(s): Kevin Shields
- Producer(s): My Bloody Valentine

My Bloody Valentine singles chronology
"Feed Me with Your Kiss" (1988)	"Instrumental" (1988)	"Sugar" (1989)

"Instrumental" (also known as "Instrumental No 1") is a song by the alternative rock band My Bloody Valentine. It was released as a limited edition free single with the first 5,000 LP copies of the band's debut studio album Isn't Anything, released on 21 November 1988 on Creation Records.

The single's B-side, also titled "Instrumental" and known as "Instrumental No 2" or "Instrumental B", demonstrates My Bloody Valentine's first known experimentation with dance music. "Instrumental No 2" features an uncredited sample of "Security of the First World", a song by Public Enemy from their 1988 studio album It Takes a Nation of Millions to Hold Us Back. Both "Instrumental No.1" and "Instrumental No.2" were remastered and reissued on the compilation album EP's 1988–1991 (2012). "Instrumental No.2" is also available on the French edition of the "Only Shallow" single released in 1992.

"Instrumental No 1" and "Instrumental No 2" were composed by vocalist and guitarist Kevin Shields, with the latter being referred to as "a real acid-house track" by Shields and "an uncanny prophecy of [1990s] drum and bass jungle" by music critic Simon Reynolds. Shields later incorporated elements of dance music on My Bloody Valentine's 1990 single "Soon", which was released on both Glider (1990) and Loveless (1991), and elements of jungle music on their third studio album m b v (2013).

== Track listing ==
All songs composed by Kevin Shields.

UK 7" single (Creation Records, CREFRE 04)

1. "Instrumental" ("Instrumental No 1") – 3:22
2. "Instrumental B" ("Instrumental No 2") – 4:45

== Personnel ==
All personnel credits adapted from Isn't Anything's liner notes.

My Bloody Valentine

- Kevin Shields – guitar
- Bilinda Butcher – guitar
- Debbie Googe – bass
- Colm Ó Cíosóig – drums

Technical personnel

- My Bloody Valentine – production
- Dave Anderson – engineering
- Steve Nunn – engineering
- Alex Russell – engineering
