= Only Shallow =

Single by My Bloody Valentine

from the album Loveless
- B-side: "Sugar"/"Instrumental"
- Released: March 1992
- Genre: Shoegaze; noise pop; alternative rock
- Length: 4:17
- Label: Creation (UK); Sire (US); Virgin (FR)
- Composer: Kevin Shields
- Lyricist: Bilinda Butcher
- Producer: Kevin Shields

My Bloody Valentine singles chronology
"When You Sleep" (1991)	"Only Shallow" (1992)

Music video
- "Only Shallow" on YouTube

"Only Shallow" is a song by the alternative rock band My Bloody Valentine. It is the opening track and second single from the band's second studio album, Loveless (1991), released on Creation Records. Written by Kevin Shields and Bilinda Butcher, "Only Shallow" features Shields' distinctive guitar sound—a technique known as "glide guitar"—characterized by heavy use of a tremolo bar while strumming.

== Origin and recording ==
"Only Shallow" was recorded during the recording sessions for Loveless, which took place over the course of three years in nineteen recording studios. Originally, producer Alan Moulder was hired for the sessions in 1989 and was the sole engineer frontman Kevin Shields trusted enough to perform tasks such as micing the amplifier. Shields has since stated that all of the engineers "with the exception of Alan Moulder and later Anjali Dutt—were all just the people who came with the studio [...] Everything we wanted to do was wrong, according to them." During the spring of 1990, Anjali Dutt was hired to replace Moulder and assisted in the recording of vocals and several guitar tracks. During this period, My Bloody Valentine recorded in various studios, often spending just one day at a studio before deciding that it was unsuitable. In May 1990, they began recording at Protocol in Holloway, London, which became their primary recording location. In July 1991, Creation agreed to relocate the production to Eastcoate studio and following the completion of the vocal tracks, "Only Shallow" was mixed by Kevin Shields and drummer Colm Ó Cíosóig with engineer Dick Meany at the Church in Crouch End during the autumn of 1991.

The vocal tracks for "Only Shallow" were recorded in Britannia Row and Protocol studios between May and June 1991. This was the first time vocalist Bilinda Butcher was involved in the recording of Loveless. Shields and Butcher hung curtains on the window between the studio control room and the vocal booth, and only communicated with the engineers when the duo would acknowledge a good take by opening the curtain and waving. According to engineer Guy Fixsen, "we weren't allowed to listen while either of them were doing a vocal. You'd have to watch the meters on the tape machine to see if anyone was singing. If it stopped, you knew you had to stop the tape and take it back to the top."

The lead guitar sound on the song's wordless refrain was recorded using a unique set-up. Speaking about the song's guitar sound to Guitar World in March 1992, Shields said: "that's just two amps facing each other, with tremolo. And the tremolo on each amp is set to a different rate. There's a mic between the two amps. I did a couple of overdubs of that, then I reversed it and played it backwards into a sampler. I put them on top of each other so they kind of merged in."

== Composition ==
"Only Shallow"
"Only Shallow" is one of two songs on Loveless that featured live performance by drummer Colm Ó Cíosóig.

"Only Shallow" is written in Gm a modal tuning, with the main riff constructed from four barre chords (F5-G5-B_{♭}5-C5). Kevin Shields uses a technique known as "glide guitar" throughout the song, characterized by heavy use of a tremolo bar while strumming, to create its distinctive sound. The main riff also uses distortion and equalization, sourced from Shields' Yamaha SPX 90 processing unit. The riff has been described as "wash of guitar effects and a hard strummed ringing bass line."

The song opens with "an immediately identifiable quick instrumental four count by Colm Ó Cíosóig on the snare." "Only Shallow" was one of the two songs that Ó Cíosóig performed live on Loveless, the other being "Touched." Ó Cíosóig was suffering from physical and personal problems during the album's recording, and samples of various drum patterns that he was able to perform in his condition were recorded on other songs. The song has extensive use of a sampler during the intro and chorus, which according to Shields is mostly feedback: "we learnt from guitar feedback, with lots of distortion, that you can make any instrument, any one that you can imagine".

== Release and reception ==
"Only Shallow" was featured as the opening track to Loveless, released on 4 November 1991 on Creation Records. To accompany the album's release in the United States, Sire Records—which handled Creation's distribution in North America—released "Only Shallow" as a promotional single in December 1991. The single featured a radio edit of the song and the album version. Three months after its release, the song peaked at number 27 on Billboard's Modern Rock Tracks, the only My Bloody Valentine song to chart in the United States to date. In March 1992, a retail version of the single was released in France and distributed free in the March 1992 issue of Les Inrockuptibles magazine. The single featured the album version of "Only Shallow," and two B-sides—a pre-Loveless song titled "Sugar" and an Isn't Anything outtake titled "Instrumental".

Upon its release, "Only Shallow" received critical acclaim. Rolling Stone editor Ira Robbins said that the song, and others like "When You Sleep," "Come in Alone" and "Soon," "send the listener falling weightlessly through space, a fantastic journey of sudden perspective shifts and jagged audio asteroids." Allmusic reviewer Stewart Mason has since called the song "a breathtaking start to a near-perfect album" and described it as a "disorienting haze of massively overdubbed and processed electric guitars."

== Music video ==
The music video for "Only Shallow" was directed by frequent collaborator Angus Cameron. Cameron had previously directed the music videos for My Bloody Valentine's "Soon", "Swallow", and "To Here Knows When" from the band's Tremolo EP. The video features footage of the band performing the song interlaced with close-ups of Bilinda Butcher singing. The video also features rapid changes in the camera direction.

Stylus Magazine described the video as "the only video which does not look like an outtake from cover shots for Isn't Anything and also the only one featuring "real" performance footage. To get a visual sense of what makes this song musically stunning, watch how Belinda [sic] Butcher's singing face montages to wildly cavorting guitar and bass frets and is interspersed with the subdued playing of the band."

== Cover versions ==
American instrumental band Japancakes covered "Only Shallow" on Loveless (2007), their tribute album covering the original Loveless in its entirety but replacing the vocals with steel guitar and the distortion with a clean sound. Canadian drone metal band Nadja covered "Only Shallow" on the band's covers album When I See the Sun Always Shines on TV (2009), slowing the song down and used digital distortion. The song was covered by Japanese band Tokyo Shoegazer for the tribute album Yellow Loveless (2013), and by Aydo Abay and his Band KEN on the album I Am Thief (2015).

== Track listings ==
All tracks are written by Kevin Shields except where noted.

US promo CD (Sire, 5191)
No.	Title	Writer(s)	Length
1.	"Only Shallow" (edit)	Bilinda Butcher, Shields	3:46
2.	"Only Shallow"	Butcher, Shields	4:17

French promo CD (Virgin SA, 3239)
No.	Title	Writer(s)	Length
1.	"Only Shallow"	Butcher, Shields	4:20
2.	"Sugar"		4:00
3.	"Instrumental"		4:37

== Personnel ==
Sources:

- Bilinda Butcher – vocals
- Kevin Shields – guitar, sampler, bass
- Colm Ó Cíosóig – drums

== Chart positions ==
Chart (1992)	Peak position
US Alternative Airplay (Billboard)	27
