= Sugar (My Bloody Valentine song) =

Single by My Bloody Valentine
- B-side: "December, with the Day" (Pacific)
- Released: February 1989
- Genre: Alternative rock, shoegaze
- Length: 4:17
- Label: Creation
- Songwriter(s): Kevin Shields
- Producer(s): My Bloody Valentine

My Bloody Valentine singles chronology
"Instrumental" (1988)	"Sugar" (1989)	"Soon" (1990)

"Sugar" is a song by the alternative rock band My Bloody Valentine. It was released as a non-album split single with Pacific, whose song "December, with the Day" is featured as the single's B-side. "Sugar"/"December, with the Day" was released in February 1989 on Creation Records and issued free with issue 67 of the British music magazine The Catalogue.

Written by vocalist and guitarist Kevin Shields, "Sugar" was recorded prior to the initial recording sessions for the band's second studio album Loveless (1991). Creation Records had requested My Bloody Valentine to record a track for The Catalogue and coincidentally "right at the same time, Bill Carey, a friend [of the band] who worked in a studio said that anytime [they] wanted to mess around in a studio, [they] could, so [they] went in and made ["Sugar"] up."

Originally released as a square 7-inch flexi disc, "Sugar" was later featured as the B-side on the 1992 French pressing of "Only Shallow". A remastered version was released on the compilation album EP's 1988–1991 (2012). Critics have described the song as "a drowsily sweet, raggedly swaying number" and "structurally pitched somewhere in between the sonic excesses of Isn't Anything and experimental passages on Loveless".

== Track listing ==
UK 7" single (Creation Records/The Catalogue, CAT067)
No.	Title	Writer(s)	Performer	Length
1.	"Sugar"	Kevin Shields	My Bloody Valentine	4:17
2.	"December, with the Day"	Denniss	Pacific	5:36

== Personnel ==
My Bloody Valentine

- Kevin Shields – vocals, guitar
- Bilinda Butcher – guitar
- Debbie Googe – bass
- Colm Ó Cíosóig – drums

Technical personnel

- My Bloody Valentine – production
