= Rollercoaster Tour =

1992 concert tour

- Tour by Blur, Dinosaur Jr., My Bloody Valentine and The Jesus and Mary Chain
- Official tour poster
- Location: United Kingdom
- Associated album: Leisure; Green Mind; Loveless; Honey's Dead
- Start date: 24 March 1992
- End date: 7 April 1992
- Legs: 1
- No. of shows: 11

The Rollercoaster Tour was a 1992 co-headlining concert tour by the Scottish noise pop band the Jesus and Mary Chain, the Irish-English alternative rock band My Bloody Valentine, the English Britpop band Blur and the American indie rock band Dinosaur Jr. A two-leg 34-date tour of the United Kingdom and North America, the U.K. tour was in support of all four bands' current releases: Blur's first album Leisure (1991), Dinosaur Jr.'s fourth album Green Mind (1991), My Bloody Valentine's second album Loveless (1991) and The Jesus and Mary Chain's fourth album Honey's Dead (1992).

The tour was curated by the Jesus and Mary Chain's vocalist Jim Reid, who "wanted to break the routine" of performing in small, frequently played venues – such as Rock City in Nottingham – and "cater to all strands of independent rock music". Reid was inspired by, and considered the Rollercoaster Tour a British equivalent to, the North American festival Lollapalooza, at which the Jesus and Mary Chain performed at in 1992 and which he considered "fairly disastrous". Each band performed a 45-minute set with no encore and the line-up changed each night of the tour, although the Jesus and Mary Chain performed as the final act on all 11 dates.

My Bloody Valentine ceased live performances in the UK after the tour and did not play again until their 2008 reunion tour. The band's set, which ended with the white noise section of their song "You Made Me Realise", reportedly caused attendees' pint glasses to fall out of their hands due to excessive sound pressure levels. Reflecting on the tour, Jim Reid referred to it as "a lot [like a] competition – who could be the loudest? Whose was the best film show? And then there was, who could be most off their tits and still play a show?" The Rollercoaster EP, containing material from Blur, My Bloody Valentine, Dinosaur Jr. and the Jesus and Mary Chain, was issued in Melody Maker in March 1992 to promote the tour.

The North American leg of the tour took place in fall 1992 and featured the Jesus and Mary Chain, Curve and Spiritualized.

== Tour dates ==
| Date | City | Country | Venue |
|---|---|---|---|
United Kingdom
| 24 March 1992 | Manchester | England | Manchester Apollo |
| 25 March 1992 | Glasgow | Scotland | SECC |
| 27 March 1992 | Whitley Bay | England | Whitley Bay Ice Rink |
| 28 March 1992 | Sheffield | England | Sheffield Arena |
| 30 March 1992 | Plymouth | England | Plymouth Pavilions |
| 1 April 1992 | Brighton | England | Brighton Centre |
| 3 April 1992 | Cardiff | Wales | Wales National Ice Rink |
| 4 April 1992 | Birmingham | England | National Exhibition Centre |
| 5 April 1992 | London | England | Brixton Academy |
| 6 April 1992 | London | England | Brixton Academy |
| 7 April 1992 | London | England | Brixton Academy |
North America
| 21 October 1992 | DeKalb | United States | Chick Evans Field House |
| 22 October 1992 | Chicago | United States | Riviera Theatre |
| 24 October 1992 | Columbia | United States | |
| 26 October 1992 | Cincinnati | United States | |
| 27 October 1992 | Columbus | United States | |
| 28 October 1992 | Cleveland | United States | The Agora |
| 30 October 1992 | Detroit | United States | State Theatre |
| 31 October 1992 | Toronto | Canada | SkyDome |
| 2 November 1992 | Montreal | Canada | Metropolis |
| 3 November 1992 | Albany | United States | |
| 4 November 1992 | Boston | United States | Avalon |
| 5 November 1992 | New York | United States | Roseland Ballroom |
| 7 November 1992 | Washington | United States | Lisner Auditorium |
| 8 November 1992 | Philadelphia | United States | Trocadero Theatre |
| 10 November 1992 | Atlanta | United States | The Masquerade |
| 11 November 1992 | New Orleans | United States | |
| 13 November 1992 | Houston | United States | |
| 14 November 1992 | Dallas | United States | Deep Ellum Live |
| 15 November 1992 | Albuquerque | United States | Student Union Building |
| 16 November 1992 | Denver | United States | Gothic Theatre |
| 17 November 1992 | Salt Lake City | United States | |
| 19 November 1992 | Sacramento | United States | Crest Theatre |
| 20 November 1992 | San Francisco | United States | The Warfield |
| 21 November 1992 | Los Angeles | United States | Hollywood Palladium |
| 22 November 1992 | San Diego | United States | |

== Rollercoaster EP ==
Rollercoaster EP

EP by Various artists
- Released: March 1992
- Genre: Alternative rock
- Length: 16:04
- Label: Melody Maker

The Rollercoaster EP is an extended play which was distributed free in a March 1992 issue of Melody Maker in support of the Rollercoaster Tour. It includes four songs: individual tracks from Blur's second album Modern Life is Rubbish (1993), My Bloody Valentine's second album Loveless (1991), the Jesus and Mary Chain's fourth album Honey's Dead (1992); and a live version of a song from Dinosaur Jr.'s third album Bug (1987).

| No. | Title | Writer(s) | Performer | Length |
|---|---|---|---|---|
| 1. | "Resigned" (from Modern Life is Rubbish) | Albarn, Coxon, James, Rowntree | Blur | 5:14 |
| 2. | "The Post" (live, originally from Bug) | Mascis | Dinosaur Jr. | 3:59 |
| 3. | "Only Shallow" (edit, from Loveless) | Butcher, Shields | My Bloody Valentine | 3:43 |
| 4. | "Teenage Lust" (from Honey's Dead) | Reid, Reid | The Jesus and Mary Chain | 3:06 |
| Total length: | | | | 16:04 |
