= Yellow Loveless =

Compilation album by various artists
- Released: January 23, 2013
- Genre: Shoegazing, alternative rock, post-rock
- Length: 62:35
- Label: High Fader

Yellow Loveless is a tribute album featuring cover versions of the 11 songs from My Bloody Valentine's 1991 record Loveless. The album was released on January 23, 2013, by High Fader Records, coincidentally just after the announcement of My Bloody Valentine's third studio album, mbv (2013).

The album features exclusive covers by Japanese artists from various genres, including sludge metal band Boris, pop punk group Shonen Knife, and shoegaze band Tokyo Shoegazer.

== Track listing ==
No.	Title	Performed by	Length
1.	"only shallow"	Tokyo Shoegazer	4:27
2.	"loomer"	GOATBED	3:19
3.	"touched"	The Sodom Project	4:48
4.	"to here knows when"	Lemon's Chair	11:18
5.	"when you sleep"	Shonen Knife	3:21
6.	"i only said"	Tokyo Shoegazer	5:13
7.	"come in alone"	Age of Punk	4:05
8.	"sometimes"	Boris	8:12
9.	"blown a wish"	Shinobu Narita (4-D Mode1)	5:12
10.	"what you want"	Lemon's Chair	6:19
11.	"soon"	Sadesper Record	6:21
