= Ecstasy and Wine =

Compilation album by My Bloody Valentine
- Released: February 1989
- Recorded: 1987
- Genre: Alternative rock
- Length: 29:09
- Label: Lazy
- Producer: My Bloody Valentine

My Bloody Valentine chronology
Isn't Anything (1988)	Ecstasy and Wine (1989)	Glider (1990)

Ecstasy and Wine is a compilation album by the Irish alternative rock band My Bloody Valentine, released in February 1989 on Lazy Records. It features the band's second mini album, Ecstasy, and the single "Strawberry Wine", both of which were previously released on Lazy Records in November 1987.

== Release and reception ==
An alternate mix of "Strawberry Wine" was used on the album due to an error by personnel at Lazy Records. Released without the band's consent, at the time of Ecstasy and Wine's release My Bloody Valentine were signed to Creation Records on which the band had released their debut studio album, Isn't Anything (1988).

Professional ratings
Review scores
Source	Rating
Hi-Fi News & Record Review	A/B:1/2

Upon its release, Ecstasy and Wine peaked at number 2 on the United Kingdom Independent Albums Chart. David Stubbs, offering a mixed review in Melody Maker, referred to the album as "a more quiet and mannered affair than Isn't Anything" and described its material as "a muffled, pastoral drone … overshadowed by a distant whirlwind of feedback". Writing for AllMusic in a positive retrospective review, Bradley Torreano described the compilation as "the sound of a band discovering its unique voice" with vocalists and guitarists Kevin Shields and Bilinda Butcher "exploring the guitar landscapes that would later become their trademark"; Torreano rated the album four out of five stars.

== Legacy ==
Shields, irate about Lazy Records releasing the album without the band's consent, retrieved 10,000 LP copies from the label's manager soon after its release. He sold the records to various distributors in the early 1990s, after My Bloody Valentine were dropped from Creation Records, and used the funds to finance later recording sessions.

In February 2012 Graham Coxon, lead guitarist of Blur, included the album in NME's list of the "100 Great Albums You've Never Heard", placing it at number 12.

== Track listing ==
All tracks are written by Kevin Shields unless otherwise noted.

Side one
No.	Title	Lyrics	Music	Length
1.	"Strawberry Wine" (alternate mix, originally from "Strawberry Wine")			2:33
2.	"Never Say Goodbye" (from "Strawberry Wine")	Shields, Googe	Shields, Ó Cíosóig	2:32
3.	"Can I Touch You" (from "Strawberry Wine")			3:15
4.	"She Loves You No Less" (from Ecstasy)			2:34
5.	"The Things I Miss" (from Ecstasy)	Shields, Ó Ciósóig	Shields, Ó Cíosóig	2:56

Side two
No.	Title	Lyrics	Music	Length
6.	"I Don't Need You" (from Ecstasy)			3:08
7.	"(You're) Safe in Your Sleep (From This Girl)" (from Ecstasy)			2:31
8.	"Clair" (from Ecstasy)	Shields, Ó Cíosóig	Shields	2:33
9.	"You've Got Nothing" (from Ecstasy)			3:41
10.	"(Please) Lose Yourself in Me" (from Ecstasy)	Shields, Ó Cíosóig	Shields	3:26

== Personnel ==
All personnel credits adapted from Ecstasy and Wine's liner notes.

My Bloody Valentine

- Kevin Shields – vocals, guitar
- Bilinda Butcher – vocals, guitar
- Debbie Googe – bass
- Colm Ó Cíosóig – drums

Guest musicians

- Nick Brown – violin (8)

Technical personnel

- My Bloody Valentine – production
- Steve Nunn – engineering

== Chart positions ==
Chart (1989)	Peak position
UK Independent Albums Chart	2
