= Feed Me with Your Kiss =

EP by My Bloody Valentine
- Released: 31 October 1988
- Recorded: 1988
- Genre: Noise rock; shoegaze
- Length: 13:26
- Label: Creation
- Producer: My Bloody Valentine

My Bloody Valentine chronology
You Made Me Realise (1988)	Feed Me with Your Kiss (1988)	Isn't Anything (1988)

"Feed Me with Your Kiss" is a song by the alternative rock band My Bloody Valentine, and was released as a single and also the lead track to the EP of the same name through Creation Records. It is the seventh track and lead single from the band's debut studio album Isn't Anything. It was released on 31 October 1988.

== Critical reception ==
EP rating
Review scores
Source	Rating
AllMusic	4/5 stars

On the EP, AllMusic critic Nitsuh Abebe wrote, "They don't feel like songs that weren't quite good enough for Isn't Anything; they might display some of the stylistic tendencies of the Ecstasy and Wine period, but they're just as worthwhile as the album tracks."

In a review specific to the track itself, Stewart Mason of AllMusic found the track "more in keeping with the moody, gothy rock of My Bloody Valentine's much-inferior earliest records." Mason also stated that the track "has a peculiar feel, pitched somewhere between the bombastic self-importance of mid-'80s Nick Cave and the ethereality of prime Cocteau Twins, mixed with the same sort of slightly dopey S&M-tinged lyrics as the roughly contemporaneous "Cigarette in Your Bed", proving that it was in the long run a very smart idea for Kevin Shields to completely bury the lyrics on My Bloody Valentine's later work." Digital Spy commended the "ear-splitting garage rock scuzz of the title track.

== Track listing ==
All tracks are written by Kevin Shields.

7-inch (CRE 061)
No.	Title	Length
1.	"Feed Me with Your Kiss"	3:56
2.	"I Believe"	3:01

- Limited to 1,000 copies, many of which showed side B misprinted as "Emptiness Inside"

Creation 12-inch EP (CRE 061T)
No.	Title	Length
1.	"Feed Me with Your Kiss"	3:56
2.	"I Believe"	3:01
3.	"Emptiness Inside"	2:50
4.	"I Need No Trust"	3:32

- Reissued on CD in April 1990 (CRESCD061)

Mercury 12-inch EP (Mercury 874 343-1)
No.	Title	Length
1.	"You Made Me Realise"	3:45
2.	"Slow"	3:11
3.	"Cigarette in Your Bed"	3:29
4.	"Feed Me with Your Kiss"	3:56
5.	"Emptiness Inside"	2:50
6.	"I Need No Trust"	3:32

- Mercury Records 12-inch from November 1988 (Mercury 874 343-1), combining tracks from this EP and its predecessor, You Made Me Realise.

== Personnel ==
- Kevin Shields – vocals, guitar
- Bilinda Butcher – vocals, guitar
- Colm Ó Cíosóig – drums
- Debbie Googe – bass guitar
- My Bloody Valentine – production
