= When You Sleep (disambiguation) =

"When You Sleep" is a song by My Bloody Valentine.

When You Sleep may also refer to:

- "When You Sleep", a song by Cake from their 1998 album Prolonging the Magic
- "When you Sleep", a 2002 single by Longview
