= Tokyo Shoegazer =

Japanese band

- Genres: Shoegaze; alternative rock
- Years active: 2010–2013; 2019–present
- Spinoffs: CQ
- Members: Kiyomi Watanabe; Hiroshi Sasabuchi; Yoshitaka Sugahara
- Past members: the k; Yuki

Tokyo Shoegazer (Japanese: 東京酒吐座, Hepburn: Tōkyō Shūgeizā) is a Japanese shoegaze band formed in 2010. Their debut album, Crystallize, was released in 2011. The band contributed two tracks to the My Bloody Valentine tribute album Yellow Loveless, those being covers of "Only Shallow" and "I Only Said".

== Career ==
Tokyo Shoegazer was initially formed as a one-time band, performing at the birthday party of Sasabuchi Hiroshi in October 2010. In 2011, the band released their debut album, Crystallize, and held a concert tour that included dates in Taiwan. In 2013, Tokyo Shoegazer contributed two tracks to Yellow Loveless, a tribute album to Loveless by My Bloody Valentine; of the 11 tracks on Yellow Loveless, Tokyo Shoegazer contributed covers of "Only Shallow" and "I Only Said". Later that year, the band released their second album, Turnaround. By the time of Turnaround's release, guitarist and vocalist Yuki had been replaced by guitarist Yoshitaka Sugahara, and shortly after the album's release, Ananda Jacobs joined the band as vocalist.

Following an announcement of resignation by the band's bassist, the K, the band held a final live performance on October 18, 2013. In May 2014, drummer Hiroshi Sasabuchi and guitarists Kiyomi Watanabe and Yoshitaka Sugahara formed a different band, CQ.

In April 2019, the band reunited. In September 2019, Crystallize was released in the United States through the Graveface Records label. In November 2019, the band toured China. On 14 October 2020, the official Instagram page for Tokyo Shoegazer announced that the band celebrated the 10th anniversary of their formation, and stated, "There was a time when the band was disbanded, but we were able to get together again because of the people who listened to our music." Tokyo Shoegazer held a 10th anniversary performance of Crystallize in December 2021, coinciding with the release of a 10th anniversary remastered version of the album.

== Members ==
- Kiyomi "antz" Watanabe – guitar
- Yoshitaka Sugahara – guitar
- Hiroshi Sasabuchi – drums
- the k – bass guitar (2010–2013)
- Yuki – guitar, vocals (2010–2013)

== Discography ==
- Crystallize (2011)
- Turnaround (2013)
- Moonworld Playground (月世界遊泳) (2022)
- turnaround -10th Anniversary Re-Recording- (2023)
- Remains (2026)
