= Angus Cameron (director) =

Angus Cameron (born 1966) is a BAFTA Scotland nominated director.

Cameron's first documentary, Ibiza - A Short Film About Chilling, is a 'classic' record of the Ibiza club scene in 1990.

He is best known for his association with Creation Records during the 1990s, where he made music videos for Ride, My Bloody Valentine, Cathedral, Primal Scream and others. Several of his videos are known for having a distinctive psychedelic visual style.

Cameron was also given a credit for photography on Loveless, which later featured a Supreme release in 2020 and created short films to accompany My Bloody Valentine's concerts, beginning with the Rollercoaster Tour. Of working with the band, he said: "I had my best and most creative working relationship with My Bloody Valentine."

Since the early 1990s he has directed several television series and documentaries, most notably Naked Ambition and Hollywood Confidential.

== Filmography ==
- Ibiza - A Short Film About Chilling (1990) Channel 4 Documentary.
- Band Explosion (1991) TV Series
- The Story of Creation (1992) Video Documentary
- Run (1995) Channel 4 TV Movie Documentary
- Lonely Planet (1999–2001) TV Series - 3 episodes
- Treks in a Wide World (2000) TV Series - 1 episode
- Miami Nice (2000) TV Movie Documentary
- Madonna - Naked Ambition (2000) Channel 4 TV Movie Documentary
- The Hollywood Greats (2002–2003) BBC One TV Series Documentary - 2 episodes
- Hollywood Confidential (2003) BBC Four TV Movie Documentary
- Days That Shook The World (2004–2005) BBC Two TV Series Documentary - 2 episodes
- Time Commanders (2005) BBC Two TV Series Documentary - All 8 episodes of series 2
- Serial Killers (2006) TV Series Documentary - 1 episode
- British Film Forever (2007) TV Series Documentary - All 7 episodes
- Wildest Dreams (2009) BBC One TV Series Documentary - All 7 episodes
- Fatal Attractions (2013) Animal Planet TV Series - 1 episode
- Crazy Love (2013) TV Movie Documentary

=== Nominations ===
- Days That Shook The World - Disaster in the Skies: The Hindenberg/Challenger Disaster (2004) - Nominated for Best Factual Programme - BAFTA Scotland Awards 2005 (Writer, Cinematographer and Director)

== Videography ==
- Loop - "Collision" (1989)
- Thee Hypnotics - "Soul Trader" (1989)
- The Jack Rubies - "Wrecker" (1989)
- The Farm - "All Together Now" (1990)
- The Family Cat - "Remember" (1990)
- The Family Cat - "A Place With A Name" (1990)
- The Jazz Butcher - "Girl Go" (1990)
- Hypnotone - "Dream Beam" (1990)
- The Heart Throbs - "Dream Time" (1990)
- Ride - "Chelsea Girl" (1990)
- Ride - "Like a Daydream" (1990)
- Ride - "Taste" (1990)
- Primal Scream - "Loaded" (1990)
- Primal Scream - "Come Together" (1990)
- Primal Scream - "Don't Fight It, Feel It" (1991)
- My Bloody Valentine - "Soon" (1990)
- My Bloody Valentine - "Swallow" (1991)
- My Bloody Valentine - "To Here Knows When" (1991)
- My Bloody Valentine - "Only Shallow" (1991)
- The House of Love - "Marble" (1991)
- The Fat Lady Sings - "Arclight" (1991)
- The Fat Lady Sings - "Twist" (1991)
- Bill Pritchard - "Number 5" (1991)
- Five Thirty - "13th Disciple" (1991)
- All About Eve - "The Dreamer" (1991)
- The Family Cat - "Colour Me Grey" (1991)
- The Family Cat - "Steamroller" (1992)
- Sweet Jesus - "Phonefreak Honey" (1992)
- The Lilac Time - "Dreaming" (1992)
- Kerry Shaw - "Could This Be Love?" (1992)
- Swervedriver - "Never Lose That Feeling" (1992)
- Carter the Unstoppable Sex Machine - "Glam Rock Cops" (1992)
- "Putting Our House in Order" Project (Charity) - "Gimme Shelter" (1992)
- Peace Together - (Charity) - "Be Still" (1993)
- The God Machine - "Home" (1993)
- Rollerskate Skinny - "Miss Leader" (1993)
- Cathedral - "Ride" (1993)
- Dodgy - "So Let Me Go Far" (1993)
- Dodgy - "Making The Most Of" (1993)
- Carter USM - "Lets Get Tattoos" (1993)
- Carter USM - "Young Offender's Mum" (1993)
- Carter USM - "Born On The 5th November" (1994)
- 18 Wheeler - "Crabs" (1994)
- Chris Braide - "Heavenly Rain" (1995)
- Capercaillie - "Breisleach" (1995)

=== Other ===
- The House of Love @ The Tasco Warehouse (1991) - Concert
- My Bloody Valentine - Rollercoaster Tour (1991) - Tour Projections
- The Manic Street Preachers @ The Marquee (1991) BBC - Concert
- My Bloody Valentine - 2008 Tour - Tour Projections
