= When You Sleep =

1991 single by My Bloody Valentine

Promotional single by My Bloody Valentine

from the album Loveless
- Released: November 1991
- Genre: Shoegaze
- Length: 4:11
- Label: Creation (UK); Sire (US); Virgin (FR)
- Songwriter: Kevin Shields
- Producer: Kevin Shields

My Bloody Valentine singles chronology
| "To Here Knows When / Swallow" (1991) | "When You Sleep" (1991) | "Only Shallow" (1992) |

"When You Sleep" is a song by rock band My Bloody Valentine on the album Loveless. As a promotional single, it was the first song released from the album.

== Background and composition ==
In an interview with Select, Shields explained the stop-start nature of his recording, using "When You Sleep" as an example: "We recorded the drums in September '89. The guitar was done in December. The bass was done in April. 1990 we're in, now. Then nothing happens for a year really. So it doesn't have vocals at this stage? No. Does it have words? No. Does it even have a title? No. It has a song number. "Song 12" it was called. And ... I'm trying to remember ... the melody line was done in '91. The vocals were '91. There were huge gaps though. Months and months of not touching songs. Years. I used to forget what tunings I'd used."

The layered vocals on "When You Sleep" were born out of frustration with trying to get the right take. Shields said that "the vocals sound like that because it became boring and too destructive trying to get the right vocal. So I decided to put all the vocals in. (It had been sung 12 or 13 times)."

He explained that on "When You Sleep" "it sounds like me and Bilinda singing together, but it's just me slowed down and me speeded up at the same time. Some songs we sang over and over until we got bored, usually between 12 and 18 times. I started sorting through the tapes and it did my head in, so I just played them all together and it was really good, like one, vaguely distinct voice."

== Reception ==
Gio Santiago of Pitchfork included "When You Sleep" in his list of best songs of the 1990s, describing the song as "a firework of emotion gone awry, a love song that leaves you so helplessly and hazily entranced. [It's] filled with indelible blown-out noise, shattered guitar feedback, and muddled confessions narrowly escaping the surface." Alexis Petridis of The Guardian ranked it as the sixth best My Bloody Valentine song, stating that "When You Sleep" stands out in Loveless due to its "blissful melody and smeared multitracked vocals [that] evoke a stoned, uncertain kind of euphoria."
