= Tremolo (EP) =

Tremolo E.P.

EP by My Bloody Valentine
- Released: 20 February 1991
- Recorded: May 1990–January 1991
- Genre: Shoegaze; noise rock; experimental rock
- Length: 18:43
- Label: Creation (UK): Sire; Warner Bros.; (US)
- Producer: My Bloody Valentine

My Bloody Valentine chronology
Glider (1990)	Tremolo E.P. (1991)	Loveless (1991)

Professional ratings
Review scores
Source	Rating
AllMusic	4.5/5 stars
The Village Voice	A− link

Tremolo E.P. is an extended play by Irish alternative rock band My Bloody Valentine, released in February 1991 by Creation Records. The EP was a critical success and topped the UK Indie Chart. It featured the single "To Here Knows When", which subsequently appeared (in a different mix) on the band's second album Loveless.

== Background ==
The EP featured the band more heavily utilising samplers, which allowed them to play back sounds on keyboard. Sampled sounds include guitar feedback, vocals, and a BBC stock sound effects recording used to create a low-end effect on "To Here Knows When", and a Turkish belly dancing track ripped from cassette on the track "Swallow". The title is a reference to the band's heavy usage of guitar tremolo and vibrato to create blurred, dreamlike tones (Kevin Shields' method of strumming chords while simultaneously bending his guitar's tremolo/whammy bar was referred to as "glide guitar").

In November 1991, Shields commented: "Tremolo had seven tracks on it, but you're not allowed to do that, so we called it four tracks and didn't name three of them. People just thought they were weird bits!" The lead track, "To Here Knows When", has a longer and more ethereal coda—essentially constituting a separate song—than the version later included on the album Loveless. "Swallow" and "Honey Power" also each contain an instrumental coda. All three segues/codas feature backwards guitar loops and heavy reverb.

Videos were filmed for the songs "Swallow" and "To Here Knows When" under the direction of Angus Cameron.

"To Here Knows When" reached number 29 on the UK Singles Chart. In 1991, Dele Fadele of NME described it as "possibly the strangest single ever to chart, Einstürzende Neubauten caught fornicating with Belinda Carlisle singing though a mouthful of cotton wool." In a 2008 article on the "weirdest" UK chart hits, Paul Lester of The Guardian describes "To Here Knows When" as a notable "how did that get there?!" moment of the 1990s, writing that both it and Underworld's "Born Slippy .NUXX" (1996) "saw strange dance sounds high in the charts".

== Track listing ==
12-inch (CRE 085T)
No.	Title	Writer(s)	Length
1.	"To Here Knows When" (plus instrumental coda)	Bilinda Butcher, Shields	5:46
2.	"Swallow" (plus instrumental coda)	Shields	4:52
3.	"Honey Power" (plus coda)	Butcher, Shields	4:35
4.	"Moon Song"	Shields	3:23

- Also issued as a CD (CRESCD085)

== Personnel ==
My Bloody Valentine

- Bilinda Butcher – guitar, vocals
- Colm Ó Cíosóig – drums, Roland Octapad on "Moon Song"
- Debbie Googe – bass guitar
- Kevin Shields – guitar, vocals, sampler

Technical personnel

- My Bloody Valentine – production, mixing
- Alan Moulder – mix engineering
- Designland – design
- Sam Harris – photographer
