= Golden Valley, Derbyshire =

Hamlet in Derbyshire, England

Coordinates: 53°3′24″N 1°22′0″W

Golden Valley
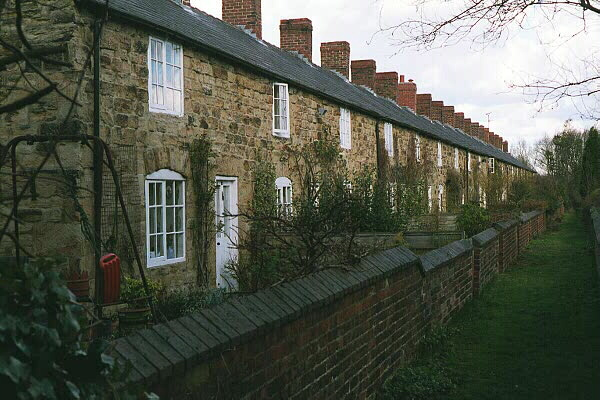
- Cottages near Riddings
- Population: small
- OS grid reference: SK4251
- District: Amber Valley
- Shire county: Derbyshire
- Region: East Midlands
- Country: England
- Sovereign state: United Kingdom
- Post town: ALFRETON
- Postcode district: DE55
- Dialling code: 01773
- Police: Derbyshire
- Fire: Derbyshire
- Ambulance: East Midlands

Golden Valley is a small hamlet in Derbyshire, England. It is between the larger villages of Codnor and Riddings, and near Ironville and Codnor Park to the east. There was once a road to Ripley, but this is now disused.

It is best known for the now derelict Cromford Canal, being at the eastern portal of Butterley Tunnel, from which the canal merges into Codnor Park Reservoir, which has an unexploded German bomb from World War II marooned at the bottom. The Pinxton arm of the canal also starts at Golden Valley.

It is also known for its picturesque cottages on the canalside, which were originally built to accommodate miners, and also the Newlands Inn, which closed down in 2007 and is currently in a state of disrepair. On 6 August 2011, a fire broke out and the building was gutted. As of 2018, the site still remains derelict.
