= Glider (EP) =

EP by My Bloody Valentine
- Released: 23 April 1990
- Recorded: 1989–1990
- Genre: Shoegaze
- Length: 18:28
- Label: Creation (UK): Sire; Warner Bros. (US)
- Producer: My Bloody Valentine

My Bloody Valentine chronology
Ecstasy and Wine (1989)	Glider (1990)	Tremolo (1991)

Professional ratings
Review scores
Source	Rating
Allmusic	link
The Village Voice	A− link

Glider is an EP by Irish rock band My Bloody Valentine, released in April 1990 by Creation Records. The EP was also the group's first release on the Sire Records label in the United States. Containing the lead single "Soon", which featured Kevin Shields' "glide guitar" technique, the EP peaked at number 2 on the UK Indie Chart, and the band toured in summer 1990 to support its release.

An alternate mix of "Soon" was later included on the Loveless album.

== Track listing ==
All tracks are written by Kevin Shields except where noted.

7-inch (CRE 073)
No.	Title	Length
1.	"Soon"	7:00
2.	"Glider"	3:10

First 12-inch (CRE 073T)
No.	Title	Length
1.	"Soon"	7:00
2.	"Glider"	3:10
3.	"Don't Ask Why"	4:03
4.	"Off Your Face" (Bilinda Butcher, Shields)	4:15

- Also issued as a cassette single (CRESC073) and CD (CRESCD073)

Second 12-inch (CRE 073X)
No.	Title	Length
1.	"Soon" (Andrew Weatherall Mix)	7:33
2.	"Glider" (Kevin Shields Remix)	10:20

- Side B is only listed as "Glider" on the center label

== Personnel ==
My Bloody Valentine

- Kevin Shields – guitar, vocals, sampler
- Bilinda Butcher – guitar, vocals
- Colm Ó Cíosóig – drums
- Debbie Googe – bass

Technical personnel

- Kevin Shields – production, mixing (tracks 1–2, 4)
- Colm Ó Cíosóig – production, mixing (track 3)
- Alan Moulder – engineering
- Andrew Weatherall – remixer (second 12-inch)
- Designland – sleeve design
- Sam Harris – photographer
