= Glide guitar =

Guitar playing technique

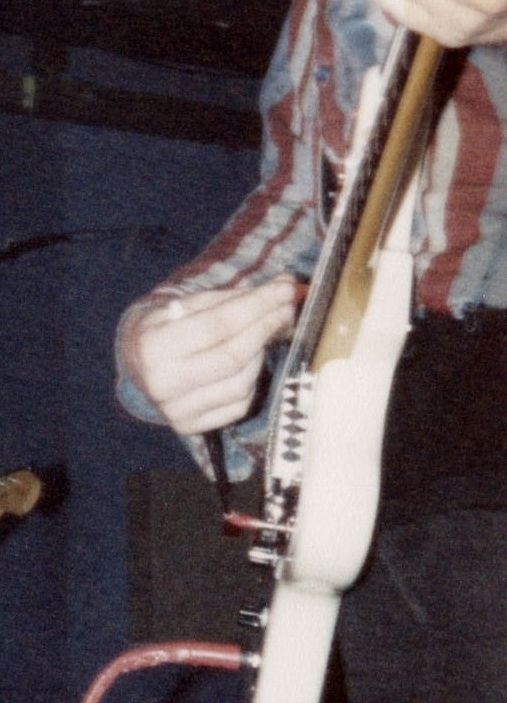
Kevin Shields playing with the glide guitar technique during a My Bloody Valentine performance in 1989.

Glide guitar is a technique for playing electric guitar in which the player holds the vibrato bar and manipulates it while strumming, resulting in a wavering pitch. It was developed with and is usually associated with a Fender Jazzmaster or Jaguar-style vibrato system. It was popularized by Irish musician Kevin Shields of My Bloody Valentine on the band's releases You Made Me Realise (1988) and Isn't Anything (1988). Shields often combined this technique with a reverse reverb effect from a Yamaha SPX90 unit or Alesis Midiverb II, and would also utilize nonstandard tuning systems.

Shields explained that he "virtually invent[ed his] own way of playing. It didn't come about in any conscious way. ... It felt playful, but on a much stronger level." The technique was later referenced in the title of the group's EP Glider (1990).

== See also ==
- Dream pop
- Shoegaze
