= Isn't Anything =

Studio album by My Bloody Valentine
- Released: 21 November 1988
- Studios: Foel, Llanfair Caereinion; Time Square and Greenhouse, London
- Genres: Shoegaze; avant-rock; dream pop; noise pop; experimental pop; noise rock
- Length: 38:00
- Labels: Creation (UK): Sire; Warner Bros.; (US)
- Producer: My Bloody Valentine

My Bloody Valentine chronology
Feed Me with Your Kiss (1988)	Isn't Anything (1988)	Ecstasy and Wine (1989)

Singles from Isn't Anything
- 1. "Feed Me with Your Kiss" Released: 31 October 1988

Isn't Anything is the debut studio album by the Irish rock band My Bloody Valentine, released on 21 November 1988 by Creation Records. Its innovative guitar and production techniques consolidated the experimentation of the band's preceding EPs and would make the album a pioneering work of the subgenre known as shoegaze. Upon its release, the album received rave critical reviews and reached No. 1 on the UK Independent Albums Chart.

== Background ==
After the band's original vocalist Dave Conway left in 1987, replaced by Bilinda Butcher, the band at first continued in their previous noisy indie-pop style. Kevin Shields then desired to return to the band's avant-garde roots and began to explore the possibilities offered by the studio facilities available after having signed to Creation Records in 1988. The first fruit of this experimentation was the single/EP You Made Me Realise, released in August 1988, with Isn't Anything following later that year.

Creation head Alan McGee recalled: "Kevin gave me 'You Made Me Realise', which was supposed to be a track on their first EP for us. I went, That's the single! He was shocked, cos they'd only done the track as a joke. Then they did stuff for their album, and I said, Go for more of the weirder stuff. So they went back and did stuff like 'Soft as Snow'. Those are the only suggestions I've ever given them."

Most of the album was recorded in a studio in Wales over a period of two weeks, and the band members slept about two hours a night. Butcher described the effect of this: "Often, when we do the vocals, it's 7:30 in the morning: I've usually fallen asleep and have to be woken up to sing. Maybe that's why it's languorous. I'm usually trying to remember what I've been dreaming about when I'm singing."

== Music ==
Isn't Anything is a shoegaze, avant-rock, dream pop, noise pop, experimental pop, and noise rock, album; Q's Stuart Maconie wrote that the album "was the first full-length expression of this remarkable new sound: gossamer vocals and insinuating melodies glimpsed through sheets of blurred, opaque noise." Jorge Martins of Ultimate Guitar said the album's sound "sat at the border between pop and lo-fi experimentation, with its evocative melodies subdued by walls of distorted guitars." Melody Maker described its sound as "swoon-songs, oblivious, languorous vocals and out-of-focus guitars which are like being taken to the brink of consciousness and held there." Taylor Parkes of The Quietus described the album as "livid, lurid and lucid," and called it "the shattering racket of the moment, an audio snapshot of the overwhelmed senses, a noise like nothing you've ever heard, but everything you've ever felt." In his book Alternative Rock, Dave Thompson described the album's sound as "dry ice-piercingly intense guitar drones and hefty nods to miasmic hardcore soup, oozing a contrary trance-spun drone. Noise becomes beauty as feedback is layered over vocals over feedback ad infinitum." Anthony Carew of About.com described its style as "atonal, desconstructed, free-noise guitar playing" and noted that it had an "ethereal, spectral quality that radically reconfigured the predominant paradigms of rock'n'roll."

"Several Girls Galore" has been described as "a cubist take on the Jesus and Mary Chain."

== Release ==
Isn't Anything was released in the United Kingdom on 21 November 1988 by Creation Records. A limited edition of the first 5,000 vinyl copies included a bonus seven-inch single featuring two instrumental tracks, both titled "Instrumental". The B-side track featured a Public Enemy drum loop from "Security of the First World." Isn't Anything's lead single "Feed Me with Your Kiss" was released in October 1988, backed with three outtakes from the album's recording sessions: "I Believe", "Emptiness Inside" and "I Need No Trust". "Soft as Snow (But Warm Inside)" was also released as a promotional single in the United States in December 1988. Neither of the album's retail singles charted.

The album was reissued on CD by Warner Bros. Records in 1993 and 2001 and by Creation in 1996. A 180-gram LP version of the album was released by Plain Records in 2008, and a remastered version of the album was released in June 2008. An additional remaster by Shields at Metropolis Studios in London was released on 4 May 2012.

== Reception and legacy ==
Professional ratings
Review scores
Source	Rating
AllMusic	5/5 stars
Entertainment Weekly	A−
The Irish Times	4/5 stars
Mojo	4/5 stars
MSN Music (Expert Witness)	A−
NME	8/10
Pitchfork	10/10
Q	4/5 stars
The Rolling Stone Album Guide	3.5/5 stars
Uncut	10/10

Upon its release, Isn't Anything received acclaim from critics. "If Isn't Anything had been made by Americans", wrote NME reviewer Jack Barron, "My Bloody Valentine would be greeted as the new messiahs of dreamrock guitar." A 1988 year-end roundup of the year's top albums in Melody Maker ranked Isn't Anything third of the year and called it "a raving nymphomania and out-of-body experience [that] establishes them as absent-minded rulers of this daydream nation."

AllMusic editor Heather Phares referred to Isn't Anything as "the most lucid, expansive articulation yet of the group's sound" and said the album "captures My Bloody Valentine's revolutionary style in its infancy and points the way to Loveless, but it's far more than just a dress rehearsal for the band's moment of greatness." Entertainment Weekly reviewer Ken Tucker reflected on Isn't Anything in 1993, saying "the passion of their playing – the rafter-shaking guitar chords, the baleful vocals – attests to their faith in romance, betrayal, and dizzy crushes. They nearly bury their somber melodies beneath surface noise. But unearthing the tunes is part of the listening pleasure."

The remasters of Isn't Anything also generated favourable reviews. Uncut's Stephen Troussé wrote: "[I]n rock algebra you might deduce that they'd worked out some new equation involving the barbed languor of the Mary Chain, the speedfreak urgency of Sonic Youth, and a dash of The Vaselines' sauce – but none of that accounts for the savagely sensual results."

Isn't Anything is regarded by many as among the greatest albums of the 1980s. The album has been included in The Guardian's list of 1000 Albums to Hear Before You Die and ranked at #16 in their Alternative Top 100 Albums list. The album was also ranked #24 in The Irish Times' list of Top 40 Irish Albums of All Time, selected by Pitchfork staff as #22 on their "Top 100 Albums of the 1980s" list and listed at #92 on Slant Magazine's list of Best Albums of the 1980s. Uncut writer David Stubbs has called Isn't Anything "one of the most important, influential British rock albums of the eighties." In its 2013 update, the NME ranked the album at 187 in the list of The 500 Greatest Albums of All Time. In 2016, Pitchfork selected the album as the fourth-best shoegaze album of all time. In 2025, Radio X included the album in its list of "The 25 best indie debut albums of the 1980s".

== Track listing ==
All music is composed by Kevin Shields, except for "Sueisfine," composed by Shields and Colm Ó Cíosóig.

No.	Title	Lyrics	Lead vocals	Length
1.	"Soft as Snow (But Warm Inside)"	Kevin Shields; Colm Ó Cíosóig	Shields	2:22
2.	"Lose My Breath"	Bilinda Butcher	Butcher	3:38
3.	"Cupid Come"	Butcher	Shields	4:29
4.	"(When You Wake) You're Still in a Dream"	Ó Cíosóig	Shields	3:18
5.	"No More Sorry"	Butcher	Butcher	2:47
6.	"All I Need"	Shields	Shields	3:05
7.	"Feed Me with Your Kiss"	Shields	Butcher, Shields	3:54
8.	"Sueisfine"	Shields	Shields	2:12
9.	"Several Girls Galore"	Butcher	Butcher	2:21
10.	"You Never Should"	Shields	Shields	3:23
11.	"Nothing Much to Lose"	Shields	Shields	3:17
12.	"I Can See It (But I Can't Feel It)"	Shields	Butcher, Shields	3:14
Total length:				38:00

Bonus limited edition single
No.	Title	Length
1.	"Instrumental No.1"	3:19
2.	"Instrumental No.2"	4:36
Total length:		7:55

== Personnel ==
All personnel credits adapted from Isn't Anything's liner notes.

My Bloody Valentine

- Kevin Shields – guitar, vocals
- Bilinda Butcher – guitar, vocals
- Colm Ó Cíosóig – drums
- Debbie Googe – bass

Technical personnel

- My Bloody Valentine – production
- Dave Anderson – engineering
- Steve Nunn – engineering
- Alex Russell – engineering
- Joe Dilworth – photography

== Chart positions ==
Chart (1988)	Peak position
UK Independent Chart	1

Chart (2012)	Peak position
Irish Albums Chart	49
Japanese Oricon Albums Chart	29
South Korean Albums Chart	70
UK Albums Chart	61

Chart (2021)	Peak position
Australian Albums (ARIA)	45
Belgian Albums (Ultratop Flanders)	116
Belgian Albums (Ultratop Wallonia)	81
Dutch Albums (Album Top 100)	63
Irish Albums (Official Charts)	31
Portuguese Albums (AFP)	44
Swedish Physical Albums (Sverigetopplistan)	2
UK Albums (OCC)	22
UK Independent Albums (Official Charts)	4
