= Loveless (album) =

1991 album by My Bloody Valentine

Studio album by My Bloody Valentine
- Released: 4 November 1991 (Note: Although Melody Maker states that the album was released on 11 November, as well as the UK Official Charts recording that it entered the top 40 after its first week of release w/c 17 November, there is a clear consensus in reputable magazines, and it is declared by the band themselves and Creation Records, that the album was released on 4 November.)
- Recorded: February 1989 – September 1991
- Genres: Shoegaze; noise pop; dream pop; neo-psychedelia; avant-rock; noise rock
- Length: 48:31
- Labels: Creation (UK): Sire; Warner Bros. (US)
- Producers: Kevin Shields; Colm Ó Cíosóig

My Bloody Valentine chronology
Tremolo (1991)	Loveless (1991)	EP's 1988–1991 (2012)

Singles from Loveless
- 1. "When You Sleep" Released: November 1991; 2. "Only Shallow" Released: March 1992

Loveless is the second studio album by the Irish rock band My Bloody Valentine, released on 4 November 1991 in the United Kingdom by Creation Records and in the United States by Sire Records. It was recorded between February 1989 and September 1991, with vocalist and guitarist Kevin Shields leading sessions and experimenting with glide guitar technique, non-standard tunings, digital sampling, and meticulous production methods. The band recorded at nineteen different studios and hired several engineers during the album's prolonged recording, with its final production cost rumoured to have reached £250,000 (equivalent to £580,000 in October 2025), though this number is disputed by Shields. (Note: This number was disputed by Kevin Shields in an interview with Magnet: "Another interesting fact is that we were only in the studio a year and 10 months. We spent six months out of the studio touring behind (1990's) Glider EP, so really, we were only in the studio a year and four months. The last two months, it was £600 a day. Every studio before that was between £200 and £250. If you actually do the math, you realize that those figures don’t add up (to the records' reported £250,000 price tag). About a year after Loveless, Creation got in trouble, right before Oasis, because Primal Scream spent £1 million on Give Up But Don't Give Out.")

Preceded by the EPs Glider (1990) and Tremolo (1991), Loveless reached number 24 on the UK Albums Chart and was widely praised by critics for its sonic innovations and Shields' "virtual reinvention of the guitar". However, after its release, Creation owner Alan McGee dropped the band from the label as he found Shields too difficult to work with, a factor alleged to have contributed to the label having to sign a co-ownership deal with Sony Music to stay financially afloat. My Bloody Valentine struggled to record a follow-up to the album and broke up in 1997, making Loveless their last full-length release until their eventual reunited effort m b v in 2013.

Since its release, Loveless has been widely cited by critics as one of the greatest albums of all time, a landmark work of the shoegaze subgenre, and a significant influence on various subsequent artists.

== Recording ==
My Bloody Valentine were scheduled to record at Blackwing Studios in Southwark, London for February 1989, and intended to conceptualise a new, more studio-based sound for their second album. Guitarist Kevin Shields said their label Creation Records believed the album could be recorded in five days. According to Shields, "when it became clear that wasn't going to happen, they freaked". After several unproductive months, the band relocated in September to the basement studio The Elephant in Wapping, where they spent eight unproductive weeks. In-house engineer Nick Robbins said Shields made it clear from the outset that Robbins "was just there to press the buttons". Robbins was quickly replaced by Harold Burgon, but according to Shields, Burgon's main contribution was to show the group how to use the in-studio computer. According to Shields, the session tapes were "confiscated" by the studio "three or four times" due to lack of payment.

Burgon and Shields spent three weeks at the Woodcray studio in Berkshire working on the Glider EP, which Shields and Creation owner Alan McGee agreed would be released in advance of the album. Alan Moulder was hired to mix the Glider song "Soon" at Trident 2 studio in Victoria; the song later appeared as the closing track on Loveless. Shields said of Moulder, "As soon as we worked with him we realized we'd love to some more!" When the group returned to work on the album, Moulder was the sole engineer Shields trusted to perform tasks such as micing the amplifiers; all the other credited engineers were told "We're so on top of this you don't even have to come to work." Shields said that "these engineers – with the exception of Alan Moulder and later Anjali Dutt – were all just the people who came with the studio ... everything we wanted to do was wrong, according to them." The band gave credit on the album sleeve to all present during the recordings, "even if all they did was fix tea", according to Shields.

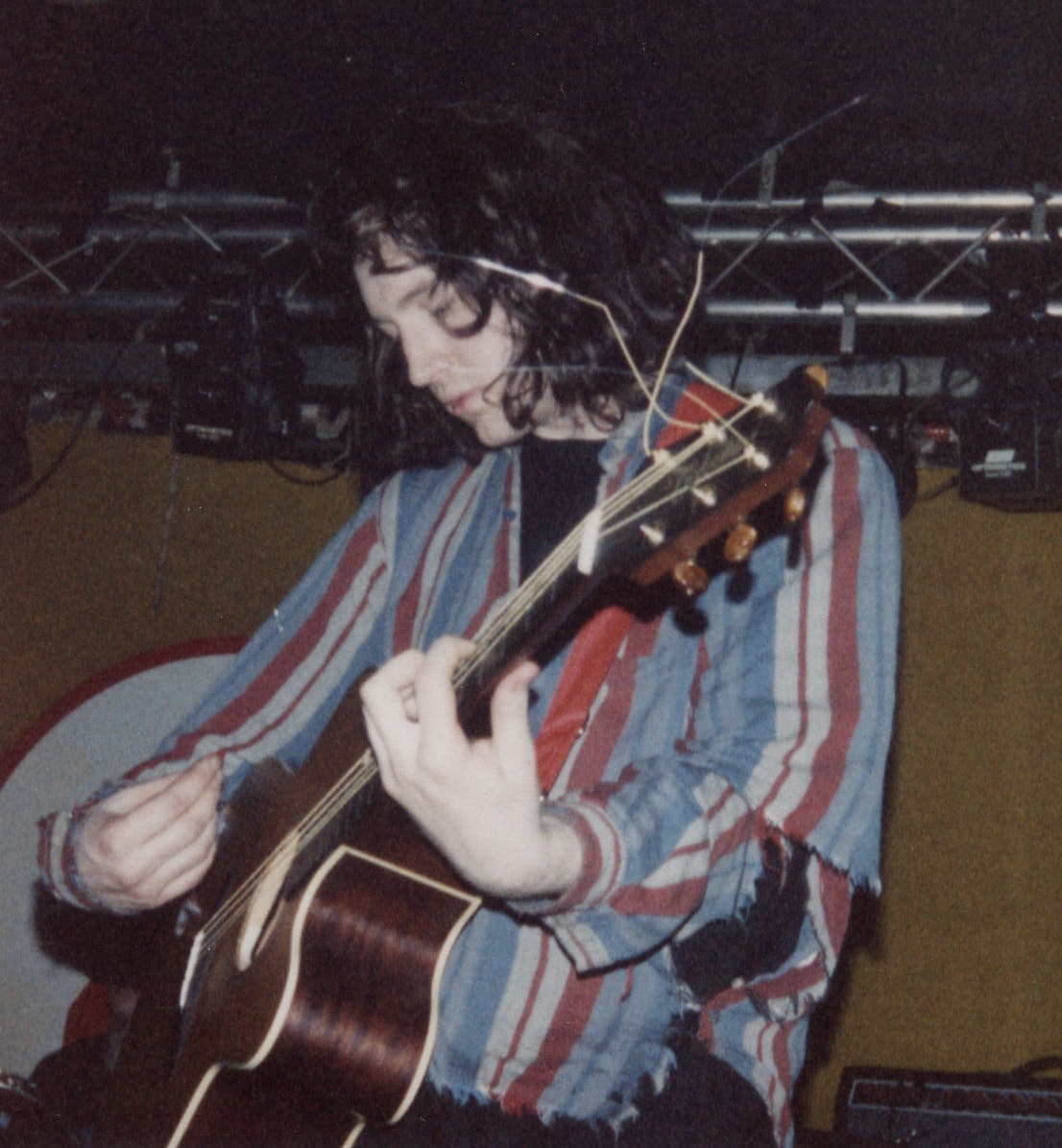
Kevin Shields performing with My Bloody Valentine in 1989

During the spring of 1990, Anjali Dutt was hired to replace Moulder, who had left to work with the bands Shakespears Sister and Ride. Dutt assisted in the recording of vocals and several guitar tracks. During this period, the band recorded in various studios, often spending a single day at a studio before deciding it was unsuitable. In May 1990, My Bloody Valentine settled on Protocol in Holloway as their primary location, and work began in earnest on the album, as well as a second EP titled Tremolo. Like Glider, Tremolo contained a song – "To Here Knows When" – that later appeared on Loveless. The band stopped recording during the summer of 1990 to tour in support of the release of Glider. When Moulder returned to the project in August, he was surprised by how little work had been completed. By that point, Creation was concerned by how much the album was costing. Moulder left again in March 1991 to work for the Jesus and Mary Chain. In an interview with Select, Shields explained the stop-start nature of his recording, using "When You Sleep" as an example:

We recorded the drums in September '89. The guitar was done in December. The bass was done in April. 1990 we're in, now. Then nothing happens for a year really. So it doesn't have vocals at this stage? No. Does it have words? No. Does it even have a title? No. It has a song number. "Song 12" it was called. And ... I'm trying to remember ... the melody line was done in '91. The vocals were '91. There were huge gaps though. Months and months of not touching songs. Years. I used to forget what tunings I'd used.

The vocals were taped in Britannia Row and Protocol studios between May and June 1991, the first time vocalist Bilinda Butcher was involved in the recording. Shields and Butcher hung curtains on the window between the studio control room and the vocal booth, and communicated with the engineers only when they would acknowledge a good take by opening the curtain and waving. According to engineer Guy Fixsen, "We weren't allowed to listen while either of them were doing a vocal. You'd have to watch the meters on the tape machine to see if anyone was singing. If it stopped, you knew you had to stop the tape and take it back to the top." On most days, the couple arrived without having written the lyrics for the song they were to record. Dutt recalled: "Kevin would sing a track, and then Bilinda would get the tape and write down words she thought he might have sung".

In July 1991, Creation agreed to relocate the production to Eastcote studio, following unexplained complaints from Shields. However, the cash-poor Creation Records was unable to pay the bill for their time at Britannia Row, and the studio refused to return the band's equipment. Dutt recalled, "I don't know what excuse Kevin gave them for leaving. He had to raise the money himself to get the gear out." Shields' unpredictable behavior, the constant delays, and studio changes were having a material effect on Creation's finances and the health of their staff. Dutt later said she had been desperate to leave the project, while Creation's second-in-command Dick Green had a nervous breakdown. Green recalled, "It was two years into the album, and I phoned Shields up in tears. I was going 'You have to deliver me this record.'"

Shields and Butcher became afflicted with tinnitus, and had to delay recording for further weeks while they recovered. Concerned friends and band members suggested this was a result of the unusually loud volumes the group played at their shows, which Shields dismissed as "ill-informed hysteria". Although Alan McGee was still positive about his investment, the 29-year-old Green, who by this time was opening the label's morning post "shaking with fear", became a concern to his co-workers. Publicist Laurence Verfaillie, aware of the label's inability to cover further studio bills, recalled Green's hair turning grey overnight, which she attributed to the album.

With the vocal tracks completed, a final mix of the album was undertaken with engineers Dick Meaney (the Jesus and Mary Chain) and Darren Allison (Spiritualized) at the Church in Crouch End, the nineteenth studio in which Loveless had been worked on. The album was edited on an aged machine that had been used to cut together dialog for movies in the 1970s; its computer threw the entire album out of phase. Shields was able to put it back together from memory, but took thirteen days to master the album rather than the usual one, to Creation's dismay.

As the previously prolific band were unusually quiet, the British music press began to speculate. Melody Maker calculated that the total recording cost had come close to £250,000; however, McGee, Green, and Shields dispute this. Shields argued that the estimated cost and Creation's near-bankruptcy were a myth exaggerated by McGee. According to Shields, "the amount we spent nobody knows because we never counted. But we worked it out ourselves just by working out how much the studios cost and how much all the engineers cost. £160,000 was the most we could come to as the actual money that was spent". In Green's opinion, the estimate made by Melody Maker was understated by £20,000, and that "once you'd even got it recorded and mixed, the very act of compiling, EQ-ing, et cetera took weeks on its own". In December 1991, Shields said that most of the money claimed to have been spent on the album was simply "money to live on" over three years, with the album itself costing only "a few thousand". He also claimed that the album represented only four months' work over two years. He said that most of the money spent came from the band's own funds, while "Creation probably spent fifteen to twenty thousand pounds of their own money on it, and that's it. They never showed us any accounts, and then they got bought out by Sony".

== Music ==
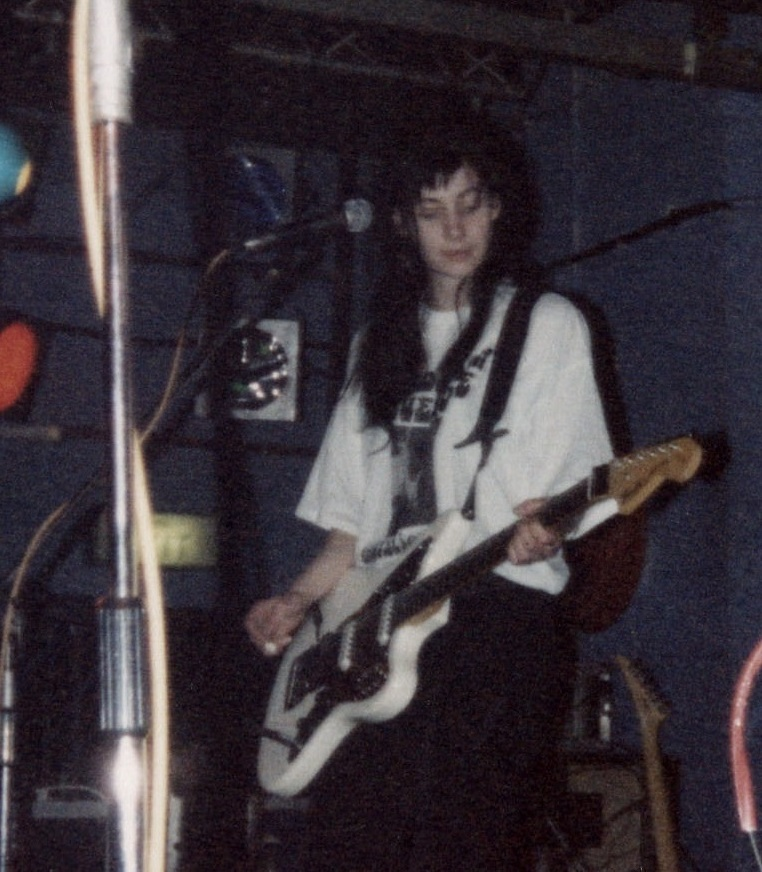
Bilinda Butcher (pictured in 1989) contributed a third of the lyrics on Loveless

The music of Loveless has been described as shoegaze, noise pop, dream pop, avant-rock, neo-psychedelia, and noise rock. While Butcher contributed about a third of its lyrics, most of the music on Loveless was written and performed by Shields; according to Shields, he is the only musician on the album's songs apart from "Touched". Shields assumed Butcher's guitarist duties during the recording process; Butcher said she had not minded because she felt she "was never a great guitarist". Bassist Debbie Googe did not perform on the album, though she received a credit. Googe said, "At the beginning I used to go down [to the studio] most days but after a while I began to feel pretty superfluous so I went down less." Butcher explained, "for Kevin to actually translate to Debbie what he had in his head and play it right would have been an agonizing process." Moulder said "It wasn't collaborative at all ... Kevin had a clear view of what he wanted, but he never explained it."

Loveless was largely recorded in mono sound, as Shields felt it important that the album's sound consisted of "the guitar smack bang in the middle and no chorus, no modulation effect". Shields wavers his guitar's tremolo bar as he strums, which contributes to the band's distinctive sound. This technique – nicknamed "glide guitar" – bends the guitar strings slightly in and out of tune. Shields said, "People were thinking it's hundreds of guitars, when it's actually got less guitar tracks than most people's demo tapes have." Unlike other bands of the shoegazing movement of the early 1990s, My Bloody Valentine did not use chorus or flanger pedals; Shields said, "No other band played that guitar like me [...] We did everything solely with the tremolo arm."

Shields aimed to use "very simple minimal effects", which often were the result of involved studio work. He stated, "The songs are really simply structured. A lot of them are purposely like that. That way you can get away with a lot more when you mess around with the contents." In a 1992 Guitar World interview, Shields described how he achieved a sound akin to a wah-wah pedal on "I Only Said" by playing his guitar through an amplifier with a graphic equaliser preamp. After recording the track, he bounced it to another track through a parametric equaliser while he adjusted the EQ levels manually. Asked if he could have achieved the effect more easily using a wah-wah pedal, Shields said, "In attitude toward sound, yes. But not in approach."

"Only Shallow"
"Only Shallow", the album's opening track is one of three songs on Loveless that featured live performance by drummer Colm Ó Cíosóig.

"Soon"
"Soon", the album's closing track, features a dance-oriented, swingbeat-influenced beat behind three tracks of Shields' "glide guitar" playing.

All but two of the drum tracks were built from samples of tracks performed by drummer Colm Ó Cíosóig. Because Ó Cíosóig was suffering from physical ailments during the recording, he recorded samples of various drum patterns he was able to perform. According to Shields, "[i]t's exactly what Colm would have done, it just took longer to do." Ó Cíosóig recovered enough to actively participate in the recording of four songs: "Touched" (which was composed and programmed entirely by him), recording live drums on "Only Shallow" and "Come in Alone", and overdubbing toms on "Loomer". Shields believes that listeners are unable to tell the difference between Ó Cíosóig's live drumming and the drum loops aside from the tracks intended to have an obviously "sampled" sound, such as the dance-oriented "Soon". The album makes extensive use of samples; according to Shields, "Most of the samples are feedback. We learnt from guitar feedback, with lots of distortion, that you can make any instrument, any one that you can imagine." In an interview with Sound on Sound, Shields said his approach to drum sampling was informed, in part, by hip hop artists like Public Enemy and their production by The Bomb Squad. "I was hearing really cool music made by hip-hop groups that were sampling stuff... [T]he whole thing about sampling back in those days is that people really started to mess with the key... I was hearing a lot of music that you just didn’t really know what was creating that sound."

The vocals, equally provided by Shields and Butcher, are kept relatively low in the mix. They are for the most part highly pitched, although at times Shields sang the higher register and Butcher the lower. According to Shields, because the band had spent so long working on the album's vocals, he "couldn't tolerate really clear vocals, where you just hear one voice", thus "it had to be more like a sound." Butcher said of her "dreamy, sensual" style vocals: "Often when we do vocals, it's 7:30 in the morning; I've usually just fallen asleep and have to be woken up to sing." To aid this effect, Shields and Ó Cíosóig sampled Butcher's voice and reused it as instrumentation. The layered vocals on "When You Sleep" were born out of frustration with trying to get the right take. Shields commented that "The vocals sound like that because it became boring and too destructive trying to get the right vocal. So I decided to put all the vocals in. (It had been sung 12 or 13 times)." He explained:

On "When You Sleep" it sounds like me and Bilinda singing together, but it's just me – me slowed down and me speeded up at the same time. Some songs we sang over and over until we got bored – usually between 12 and 18 times. I started sorting through the tapes and it did my head in, so I just played them all together and it was really good – like one, vaguely distinct voice.

The lyrics are deliberately obscure; Shields joked that he considered rating various attempts to decipher the words on the band's website according to accuracy. He claims that he and Butcher "spent way more time on the lyrics than ever on the music". The words were often written in late-night eight- to ten-hour-long sessions before the pair were due to record the vocals. They worked diligently to ensure the lyrics were not lacklustre, but made few changes; Shields said, "There's nothing worse than bad lyrics." Nonetheless, pressed by Select's David Cavanagh to reveal just the first line of "Loomer", Butcher refused, and Shields claimed to have "absolutely no idea" what she was singing.

== Artwork ==
Initially an idea of Shields, the photograph on the album's cover was taken by Scottish photographer and director Angus Cameron, and features two respective images of both a Fender Jaguar and a Fender Jazzmaster, two guitars heavily utilised on the album, digitally overlaid beneath a pink filter to create a visually distorted effect, representative of the album's sound. The reverse cover features a Jazzmaster alone, while the album's insert features a Jaguar alone under a light blue filter. The band name is written in lower-case at the bottom left of the cover in Kabel font. This same font would be used for the front cover of 2003 romantic comedy drama film Lost in Translation, whose soundtrack features the song "Sometimes".

== Tour ==
Creation funded a short late 1991 tour of the north of England. At the time, My Bloody Valentine were making promotion of the album difficult for Creation. They did not want to release singles, and did not want the band's name to appear on the record sleeve. In frustration, Alan McGee recalled, "I thought: I went to the wall for you. If this record bombs, I've stolen my father's money. And they were so ... not understanding of anybody else's position." The tour was described by an event music critic David Cavanagh as a "unique chapter in live music". To recreate the higher tones from Loveless, Shields employed American flautist Anna Quimby. According to a friend of the band, "She had a little skirt on, black tights ... she was a little indie girl. But when she blew into the flute, it was like fucking Woodstock."

The tour became infamous for its volume. NME editor Danny Kelly attended a show he described as "more like torture than entertainment ... I had a half pint of lager; they hit their first note, and it was so loud that it sent the glass hurtling". During the following US tour, Shields and Butcher tested their audiences' ability to sustain noise played at high volumes. According to critic Mark Kemp "After about thirty seconds the adrenaline set in, people are screaming and shaking their fists. After a minute you wonder what's going on. After another minute it's total confusion. The noise starts hurting. The noise continues. After three minutes you begin to take deep breaths. After four minutes, a calm takes over." In December 2000, Mojo rated the tour the second loudest in history.

== Reception ==
Professional ratings
Review scores
Source	Rating
AllMusic	5/5 stars
Entertainment Weekly	A
Mojo	5/5 stars
NME	8/10
Pitchfork	10/10
Q	4/5 stars
Rolling Stone	4/5 stars
The Rolling Stone Album Guide	5/5 stars
Select	5/5
The Village Voice	A−

Although Shields feared a critical panning, Loveless received critical acclaim and came in at number 14 in the 1991 Village Voice Pazz & Jop critics' poll. It peaked at number 24 on the UK Albums Chart, and failed to chart in the United States, where it was distributed by Sire Records. In 2003, Rolling Stone estimated that Loveless had sold 225,000 copies. "An album without parallel", wrote Andrew Perry in Select. "Its creative inspiration defies belief. Though 'To Here Knows When' is pretty well the weirdest track of the eleven, that glorious distortion gives a fair signal of what to expect – the unexpected. Everything you hear confounds your idea of how a pop song should be played, arranged and produced." Martin Aston in Q wrote that "The instrumental 'Touched' is especially startling, like a drunken fight between a syrupy Disney soundtrack and an Eastern mantra. All in all, Loveless amounts to a virtual reinvention of the guitar."

NME reviewer Dele Fadele saw My Bloody Valentine as the "blueprint" for the shoegaze genre, and wrote: "with Loveless you could've expected the Irish / English partnership to succumb to self-parody or mimic The Scene That's Delighted To Eat Quiche [...] But no, Loveless fires a silver-coated bullet into the future, daring all-comers to try and recreate its mixture of moods, feelings, emotion, styles and, yes, innovations." While Fadele expressed some disappointment that the group seemed to disassociate themselves from dance music and reggae basslines, he concluded: "Loveless ups the ante, and, however decadent one might find the idea of elevating other human beings to deities, My Bloody Valentine, failings and all, deserve more than your respect." Melody Maker writer Simon Reynolds praised the album, and wrote that Loveless "[reaffirms] how unique, how peerless MBV are." He wrote, "Along with Mercury Rev's Yerself is Steam, 'Loveless' is the outermost, innermost, uttermost rock record of 1991." Reynolds noted that his only criticism was that "while My Bloody Valentine have amplified and refined what they already were, they've failed to mutate or leap into any kind of beyond."

In a review for Rolling Stone, Ira Robbins wrote that "despite the record's intense ability to disorient – this is real do-not-adjust-your-set stuff – the effect is strangely uplifting. Loveless oozes a sonic balm that first embraces and then softly pulverizes the frantic stress of life." Chicago Tribune critic Greg Kot wrote that the band had "written a new vocabulary for the guitar, and perhaps given it another 10 years of life as rock's central instrument". Spin gave Loveless a mixed review; writer Jim Greer felt it was "standard-ish and dull ... The warped music is a cool idea and I recommend the album – but not on the basis of the singing or the songs."

== Aftermath ==
While Creation were pleased with the final album, and the initial music press reviews were positive, the label soon realised that although, in the words of plugger James Kyllo, "it was such a beautiful record, and it was wonderful to have it ... it just didn't sound like a record that was going to recoup all the money that had been spent on it." Alan McGee liked the record, but said, "It was quite clear that we couldn't bear the idea of going through that again, because there was just nothing to say that [Shields] wouldn't do exactly the same again. That's enough. Let's step back".

McGee dropped the band from Creation soon after the release of Loveless because he could not bear working with Shields again; "It was either him or me," he told The Guardian in 2004. Despite expectations for the band to break through in the wake of the album's critical success, they fell apart soon after and recorded only sporadically in the following two decades. Unable to deliver a third album, Shields isolated himself and "went crazy," drawing comparisons in the music press to the behavior of musicians such as Brian Wilson of the Beach Boys and Syd Barrett of Pink Floyd. The other band members went their own ways; Butcher contributed vocals to Collapsed Lung's 1996 single "Board Game" and two tracks ("Ballad Night" and "Casino Kisschase") from the band's 1996 album Cooler. Googe was sighted working as a cab driver in London and formed the supergroup Snowpony in 1996. Ó Cíosóig joined Hope Sandoval & the Warm Inventions, while Shields collaborated with Yo La Tengo, Primal Scream and Dinosaur Jr.

Shields recorded new music in his home studio, but abandoned it. According to sources, some of the music was possibly influenced by jungle music. Shields said, "We did an album's worth of half-finished stuff, and it did just get dumped, but it was worth dumping. It was dead. It hadn't got that spirit, that life in it." He said later, "I just stopped making records myself, and I suppose that must just seem weird to people. 'Why'd you do that?' The answer is, it wasn't as good [as Loveless]. And I always promised myself I'd never do that, put out a worse record." He told Magnet of his certainty in recording another My Bloody Valentine album, and attributed the sparse output to a lack of inspiration. Shields confirmed My Bloody Valentine's reunion in 2007, and said that the band's third studio album was near completion. The album, m b v, was released in 2013, 22 years after Loveless.

== Legacy ==
Loveless has been influential on a large number of genres and artists. Clash called the album "the magnum opus of the shoegazing genre ... it raised the bar so high that it subsequently collapsed under its own weight," leading to the dissipation of the style. Critic Jim DeRogatis wrote that "the forward-looking sounds of this unique disc have positioned the band as one of the most influential and inspiring bands since the Velvet Underground." Authors Paul Hegarty and Martin Halliwell wrote that the album "might be so progressive that nothing else will ever match it." Metro Times called the album "the high-water mark of shoegaze," writing that its "dense production and hypnotic atmosphere drugged listeners with its sound's lovely oxymoron: at once hard and soft, up-tempo and languid, lascivious and frigid." Paul Lester of The Guardian called it "the Pet Sounds of UK avant-rock," while Pitchfork's Ryan Schreiber named Loveless–alongside Radiohead's OK Computer and Pink Floyd's The Dark Side of the Moon–as an album that outshines Pet Sounds.

Musician Brian Eno said that "Soon" "set a new standard for pop. It's the vaguest music ever to have been a hit." Robert Smith of the Cure discovered Loveless after a period of almost exclusively listening to disco and/or Irish bands such as the Dubliners as a means of avoiding his contemporaries and said, "[My Bloody Valentine] was the first band I heard who quite clearly pissed all over us, and their album Loveless is certainly one of my all-time three favourite records. It's the sound of someone [Shields] who is so driven that they're demented. And the fact that they spent so much time and money on it is so excellent." Billy Corgan of the Smashing Pumpkins told Spin: "It's rare in guitar-based music that somebody does something new [...] At the time, everybody was like, 'How the fuck are they doing this?' And, of course, it's way simpler than anybody would imagine." (Note: Corgan later recruited Alan Moulder to coproduce the Pumpkins' Mellon Collie and the Infinite Sadness (1995). Trent Reznor of Nine Inch Nails, who praised the album's diversity and production, also worked with Moulder on his The Fragile.) Hüsker Dü and Sugar frontman Bob Mould has called the album "a masterpiece" and praised its uniqueness, stating, "[i]t had all the ear-marks of things that I love about music and things I do with music, but it just sounded so unique. (...) When you stand in this position in the room it sounds one way, when you stand in another it sounds the other way – it never sounds the same way twice."

Japancakes recorded a cover album of Loveless which includes every song from the original in the same sequence. It was released on Darla Records in 2007. In 2013, Kenny Feinstein of Water Tower released a solo cover album of Loveless entitled Loveless: Hurts to Love (Fluff & Gravy). It is mostly acoustic and features a wide assortment of instruments including guitar, piano, mandolin, violin, bass, cello, harmonium, and dobro. Feinstein plays most of the instruments on the album himself and provides lead vocals. Also appearing on the album are musician Jeff Kazor of The Crooked Jades and engineer Bruce Kaphan who helped Feinstein create an "acoustic wall of sound" that emulates the original album's distorted layers.

=== Accolades ===
Loveless has been a consistent critical favourite. In 1999, it topped Pitchfork's list of the best albums of the 1990s. However, in its 2003 revision of the list, the album was moved to number two, swapping places with Radiohead's OK Computer. A 2022 listing restored it to the top spot. Pitchfork named Loveless the greatest shoegaze album of all time. In 2000, the album was voted number 63 in Colin Larkin's All Time Top 1000 Albums. In 2003, Rolling Stone ranked it number 219 on its list of the 500 greatest albums of all time, 221 in a 2012 revised list and 73 in another revised list published in 2020. In 2004, The Observer ranked it at number 20 in its "100 Greatest British Albums" list, declaring it "the last great extreme rock album."

The album was ranked at number 22 on Spin's list of "100 Greatest Albums 1985–2005," with Chuck Klosterman writing that "whenever anyone uses the phrase swirling guitars, this record is why. A testament to studio production and single-minded perfectionism, Loveless has a layered, inverted thickness that makes harsh sounds soft and fragile moments vast." Loveless won the 2008 Mojo Award for Classic Album, and in 2008 it came first The Irish Times' "Top 40 Irish Albums of All Time" critics' list, and in 2013, it placed third in the Irish Independent's "Top 30 Irish Albums of All Time" list. In 2014, it placed ninth on the Alternative Nation site's "Top 10 Underrated 90's Alternative Rock Albums" list. In 2013, NME ranked the album at number 18 on its "500 Greatest Albums of All Time" list. The album was also included in the book 1001 Albums You Must Hear Before You Die. In 2020, Paste named it the eighth-best album of the 1990s and the second-best dream pop album of all time.

Accolades for Loveless
Publication	Accolade	Rank
Irish Independent	Top 30 Irish Albums of All Time	3
The Irish Times	Top 40 Irish Albums of All Time	1
NME	500 Greatest Albums of All Time	18
Paste	The 90 Best Albums of the 1990s	8
Paste	The 25 Best Dream Pop Albums of All Time	2
Pitchfork	100 Greatest Albums of the 1990s (1999)	1
Pitchfork	100 Greatest Albums of the 1990s (2003)	2
Pitchfork	150 Greatest Albums of the 1990s	1
Pitchfork	The 50 Best Shoegaze Albums of All Time	1
Rolling Stone	500 Greatest Albums of All Time (2003)	219
Rolling Stone	500 Greatest Albums of All Time (2012)	221
Rolling Stone	500 Greatest Albums of All Time (2020)	73
Spin	100 Greatest Albums 1985–2005	22

== Track listing ==
All music is composed by Kevin Shields, except "Touched", composed by Colm Ó Cíosóig.

Loveless track listing
No.	Title	Lyrics	Lead vocals	Length
1.	"Only Shallow"	Bilinda Butcher	Butcher	4:17
2.	"Loomer"	Butcher	Butcher	2:38
3.	"Touched"	instrumental	instrumental	0:56
4.	"To Here Knows When"	Butcher; Shields	Butcher	5:31
5.	"When You Sleep"	Shields	Shields	4:11
6.	"I Only Said"	Shields	Shields	5:34
7.	"Come in Alone"	Shields	Shields	3:58
8.	"Sometimes"	Shields	Shields	5:19
9.	"Blown a Wish"	Butcher	Butcher	3:36
10.	"What You Want"	Shields	Shields	5:33
11.	"Soon"	Shields	Shields	6:58
Total length:				48:31

Notes

- On some releases, every song's title is stylized in all lowercase letters. For example, "When You Sleep" is stylized as "when you sleep". Other releases use regular title case for the song titles.

== Personnel ==
All personnel credits are adapted from the liner notes of Loveless.

My Bloody Valentine

- Colm Ó Cíosóig – drums, sampler
- Bilinda Butcher – vocals; guitar (credited, does not perform)
- Debbie Googe – bass (credited, does not perform)
- Kevin Shields – guitar, vocals, sampler; bass (uncredited)

Production and mixing

- Kevin Shields – (except on "Touched")
- Colm Ó Cíosóig – (on "Touched")

Engineering and assistance

- Alan Moulder
- Kevin Shields
- Colm Ó Cíosóig
- Dick Meaney
- Anjali Dutt
- Guy Fixsen
- Harold Burgon
- Nick Robbins
- Ingo Vauk
- Andy Wilkinson
- Darren Allison
- Nick Addison
- Charles Steel
- Tony Falter
- Hugh Price
- Adrian Bushby
- Pascale Giovetto
- Nick Savage

Artwork and release

- My Bloody Valentine – cover concept
- Angus Cameron – photography

== Charts ==
1991 chart performance for Loveless
Chart (1991)	Peak position
European Albums (Music & Media)	47
UK Albums (Official Charts)	24

2012 chart performance for Loveless
Chart (2012)	Peak position
Belgian Albums (Ultratop Flanders)	154
Belgian Albums (Ultratop Wallonia)	188
Irish Albums (IRMA)	29
Japanese Albums (Oricon)	18
South Korean Albums (Gaon)	43
South Korean International Albums (Gaon)	7

2021 chart performance for Loveless
Chart (2021)	Peak position
Australian Albums (ARIA)	6
Belgian Albums (Ultratop Flanders)	26
Belgian Albums (Ultratop Wallonia)	23
Danish Albums (Hitlisten)	5
Dutch Albums (Album Top 100)	13
Finnish Albums (Suomen virallinen lista)	28
German Albums (Offizielle Top 100)	23
Irish Albums (Official Charts)	6
New Zealand Albums (RMNZ)	7
Portuguese Albums (AFP)	14
Swedish Albums (Sverigetopplistan)	53
UK Albums (Official Charts)	7
UK Independent Albums (Official Charts)	2

== Certifications ==
Certifications for Loveless
Region	Certification	Certified units/sales
United Kingdom (BPI)	Gold	100,000^{‡}
^{‡} Sales+streaming figures based on certification alone.

== Sources ==
- Cavanagh, David (2000). The Creation Records Story: My Magpie Eyes Are Hungry for the Prize. London: Virgin Books. ISBN 0-7535-0645-9.
- DeRogatis, Jim (2003). Turn On Your Mind: Four Decades of Great Psychedelic Rock. Milwaukee: Hal Leonard Corporation. ISBN 0-634-05548-8.
- Hegarty, Paul; Halliwell, Martin (2011). Beyond and Before: Progressive Rock Since the 1960s. New York: The Continuum International Publishing Group. ISBN 978-0-8264-2332-0.
- McGonigal, Mike (2007). Loveless. New York: The Continuum International Publishing Group Inc. ISBN 978-0-8264-1548-6.
