= Bilinda Butcher =

English musician

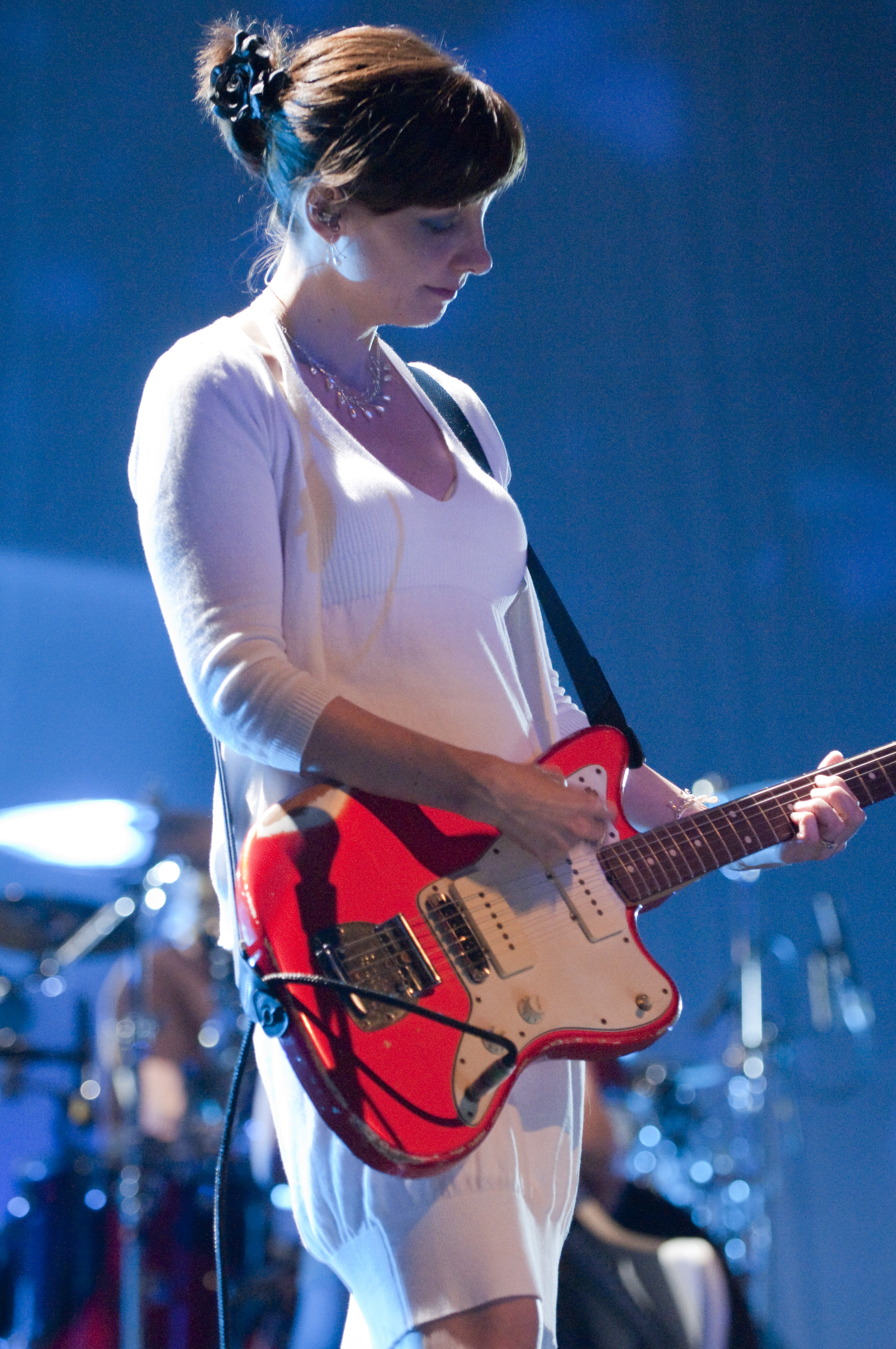
- Butcher performing in 2009

Background information
- Born: Bilinda Jayne Butcher; 16 September 1961 (age 65); London, England
- Genres: Shoegaze; dream pop; alternative rock
- Occupations: Musician; singer; songwriter
- Instruments: Vocals; guitar
- Years active: 1987–present
- Labels: Lazy; Creation; Sony; mbv; domino
- Member of: My Bloody Valentine

Bilinda Jayne Butcher (born 16 September 1961) is an English musician who achieved international fame as a guitarist, vocalist and lyricist of the alternative rock band My Bloody Valentine. Their studio albums Isn't Anything (1988) and Loveless (1991) established Butcher as a pioneering figure in the shoegaze genre.

Butcher was born and raised in London and later relocated with her family to Golden Valley, Derbyshire. She played classical guitar as a child and joined My Bloody Valentine in April 1987, initially as a backing vocalist, while they were still largely unknown.

== Early life ==
Butcher was born and raised in London and later relocated with her parents and older sister Jo-Anne to Golden Valley, Derbyshire, a small hamlet in the countryside. Her forename is an alternate spelling of Belinda and was chosen by her mother. Butcher has been quoted as saying, "if I'd been a guy I would have been named Bill, but since I was a girl it became Bilinda".

Butcher has said that growing up in Golden Valley she was considered "a weirdo" as she wore clothes based on 1920s fashion and listened to records on a portable gramophone. Butcher stated: "My mother thought I was up in the clouds. I never watched the news or read the papers; it was like I lived in another era. Everybody was into punk and I was living in the '20s and '30s." At age sixteen, Butcher moved back to London and began studying dance at the Trinity Laban Conservatoire of Music and Dance. After leaving Trinity Laban, Butcher worked as a nanny for a French family in London for six months before moving to Paris for another six months with her partner. The pair moved back to London and had a child, Toby.

== Career ==
=== My Bloody Valentine ===
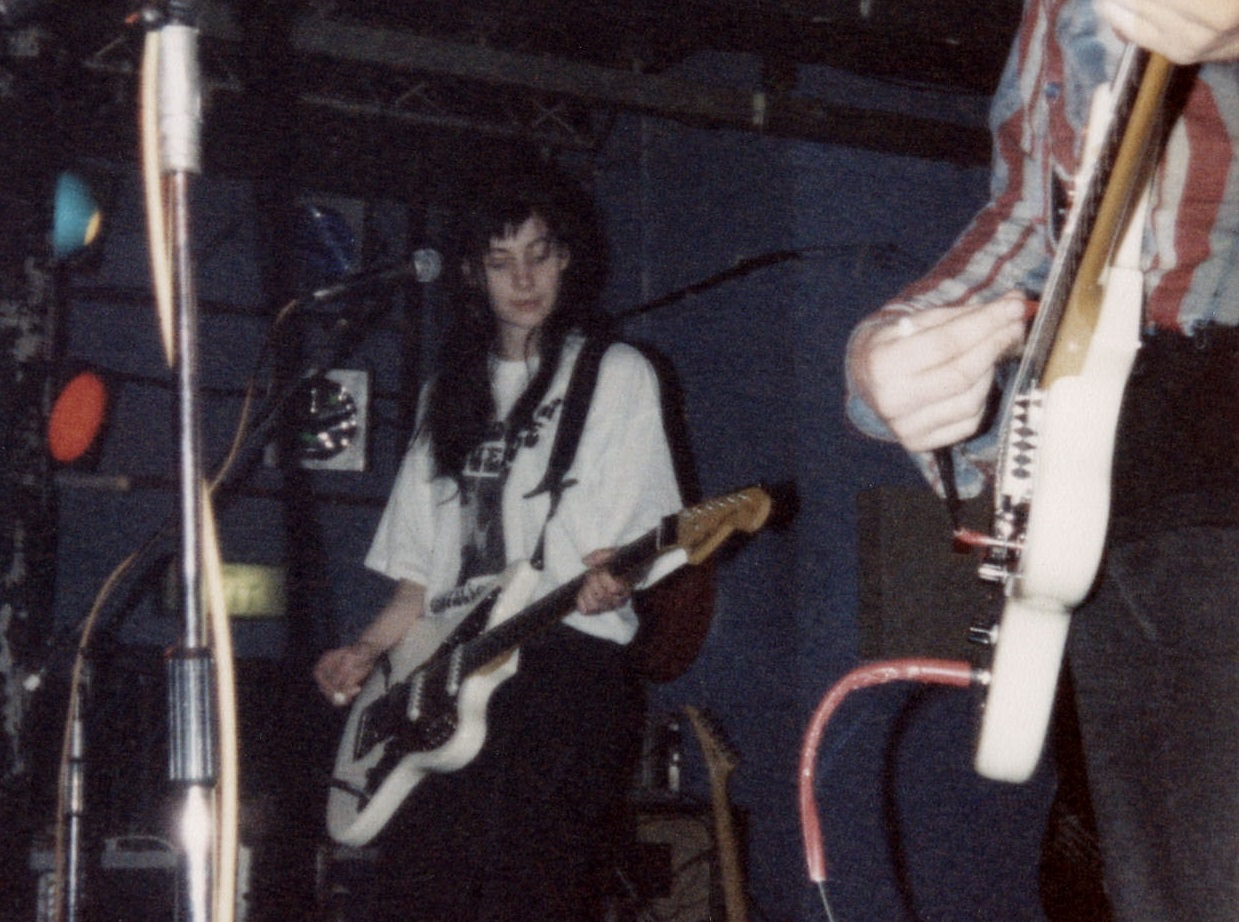
Butcher performing with My Bloody Valentine in 1989

Butcher was recruited as a vocalist for My Bloody Valentine in April 1987. She replaced original vocalist David Conway and shared vocal duties briefly with Joe Byfield. Butcher, whose prior musical experience was playing classical guitar as a child and singing and playing tambourine "with some girlfriends for fun", learned that the group needed a backing vocalist from her boyfriend, who had met drummer Colm Ó Cíosóig on a ferry from the Netherlands. At her audition for the band, she sang "The Bargain Store", a song from Dolly Parton's 1975 album of the same name.

Butcher was featured as co-vocalist and co-guitarist on My Bloody Valentine's non-album single, "Strawberry Wine", and the band's second mini album, Ecstasy, both of which were released in 1987 on Lazy Records. She performed vocals and guitar on all further My Bloody Valentine releases, until the band's second studio album Loveless (1991), on which her guitar duties were performed by co-vocalist and guitarist Kevin Shields. She contributed a third of the lyrics to Isn't Anything (1988) and Loveless, as well as other releases including You Made Me Realise (1988), Glider (1990) and Tremolo (1991).

My Bloody Valentine attempted to record a third studio album after signing with Island Records in October 1992 for a reported £250,000 contract. The band's advance went towards the construction of a home studio in Streatham, South London, which was completed in April 1993. Several technical problems with the studio sent the band into "semi-meltdown", according to Shields. The band then went on an extended hiatus.

My Bloody Valentine reunited in 2007, and released their third album, m b v, in 2013. My Bloody Valentine began a worldwide tour in November 2025.

=== Other collaborations ===
Butcher performed lead vocals on two tracks—"Ballad Night" and "Casino Kisschase"—on the hip hop band Collapsed Lung's album Cooler (1996), and performed backing vocals on the Dinosaur Jr song "I Don't Think" from Hand It Over (1997). In 2013, Butcher performed with The Jesus and Mary Chain at Primavera Sound, providing vocals on "Just Like Honey".

== Artistry ==
During her adolescence, Butcher was a fan of post-punk and gothic rock bands such as Bauhaus and The Birthday Party. Her vocal style was originally influenced by Françoise Hardy and later by Kim Gordon of Sonic Youth. She uses a number of offset guitars (i.e. having asymmetrical body shapes); her most notable instruments include the Fender electric guitars Jaguar, Jazzmaster and Mustang. On occasion, Butcher uses a Charvel Surfcaster, which she has referred to as her favourite guitar. When performing live, Butcher uses a minimal number of effects pedals and processors.

Butcher's vocals have been referred to as a trademark of My Bloody Valentine's sound, alongside Kevin Shields' guitar techniques. During the recording of Isn't Anything, Butcher had fallen asleep in the studio, and was woken to record her vocals, experiences she said "influenced [her] sound" by making them "more dreamy and sleepy". A similar process was used during the recording of Loveless, on which her vocals have been described as "dreamy [and] sensual". Butcher said: "often when we do vocals, it's 7:30 in the morning; I've usually just fallen asleep and have to be woken up to sing ... I'm usually trying to remember what I've been dreaming about when I'm singing".

Butcher wrote a third of the lyrics on both Isn't Anything and Loveless. She has said that she "didn't have a plan and never thought about lyrics until it was time to write them. I just used whatever was in my head for the moment". Some of her lyrics were written as a result of attempting to understand rough versions of songs Shields had recorded. Butcher has said: "He [Shields] never sang any words on the cassettes I got but I tried to make his sounds into words. It always became my own thing in the end though".
