= List of songs recorded by My Bloody Valentine =

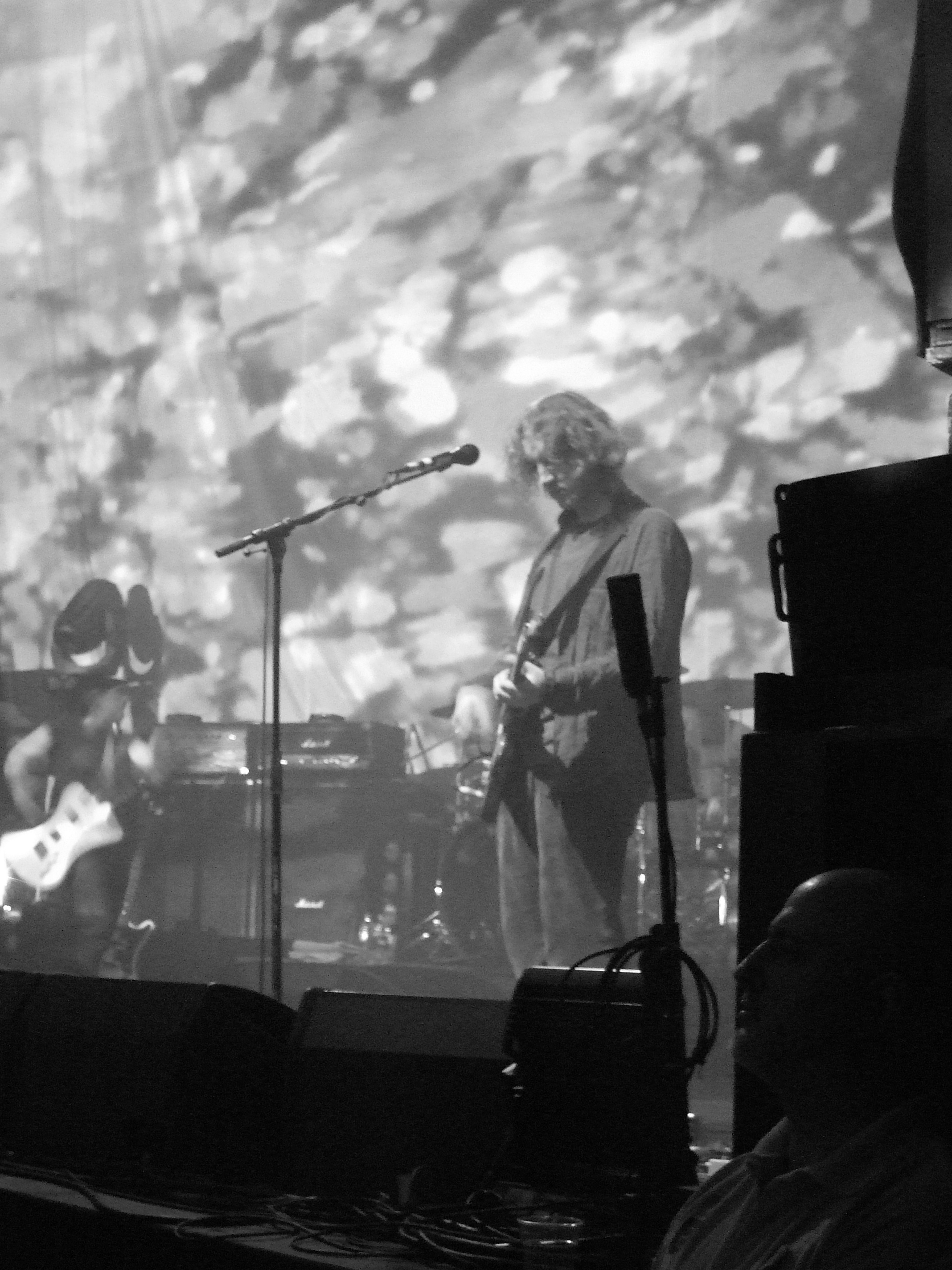
My Bloody Valentine performing at the Roundhouse in London, England in June 2008

My Bloody Valentine, an alternative rock band from Dublin, Ireland, have recorded songs for three studio albums and a number of extended plays, singles and compilation releases. Formed in 1983 by Kevin Shields, Colm Ó Cíosóig and David Conway, the band had a series of unsuccessful releases throughout the mid-1980s on various independent record labels. In 1987, after the addition of bassist Debbie Googe and vocalist-guitarist Bilinda Butcher, My Bloody Valentine released "Strawberry Wine", Ecstasy, and the 1988 EP You Made Me Realise, which were predecessors to the band's debut album Isn't Anything (1988). Considered an independent success, the band released two further EPs before Loveless (1991), their second studio album; which is considered their magnum opus and which received unanimous critical acclaim since its release. Both albums pioneered an alternative rock subgenre known as shoegazing, a term coined by Sounds journalists to describe certain bands' "motionless performing style, where they stood on stage and stared at the floor". My Bloody Valentine disbanded in 1997 after failing to finish a third album, although Kevin Shields was rumoured to have sent 60 hours' worth of material to Island Records, with whom the band signed after being dropped by Creation Records in 1991. My Bloody Valentine reunited in 2007 and began completing their third album. The album, m b v, was self-released in 2013 and received "universal acclaim", according to Metacritic.

The band were unsuccessful during their early career, with reviews of their initial releases being unanimously negative. My Bloody Valentine first experienced chart success with their EP The New Record by My Bloody Valentine (1986), which entered the UK Independent Singles Chart at number 22. Their successive releases, 1987's "Sunny Sundae Smile", "Strawberry Wine" and Ecstasy all placed in the independent charts, along with "Feed Me with Your Kiss", "Soon", "To Here Knows When" and Isn't Anything, which peaked at number 1 upon its release. Loveless is the most commercially successful of the band's releases—it peaked at number 24 in the UK Albums Chart and has sold over 290,000 copies in the United States, according to Nielsen SoundScan.

Among some of My Bloody Valentine's best-known songs are "Only Shallow", a song which includes notable use of Kevin Shields' "glide guitar" technique; "Sometimes", which was featured on the soundtrack to the 2003 film Lost in Translation; "Soon", a duet which incorporates elements of dance music; and "You Made Me Realise", which during live performances features an interlude of noise and excessive feedback known as "the holocaust", which has often lasted for half an hour and reached 130 db.

== Songs ==
Key
†	Indicates single release
#	Indicates promotional single release

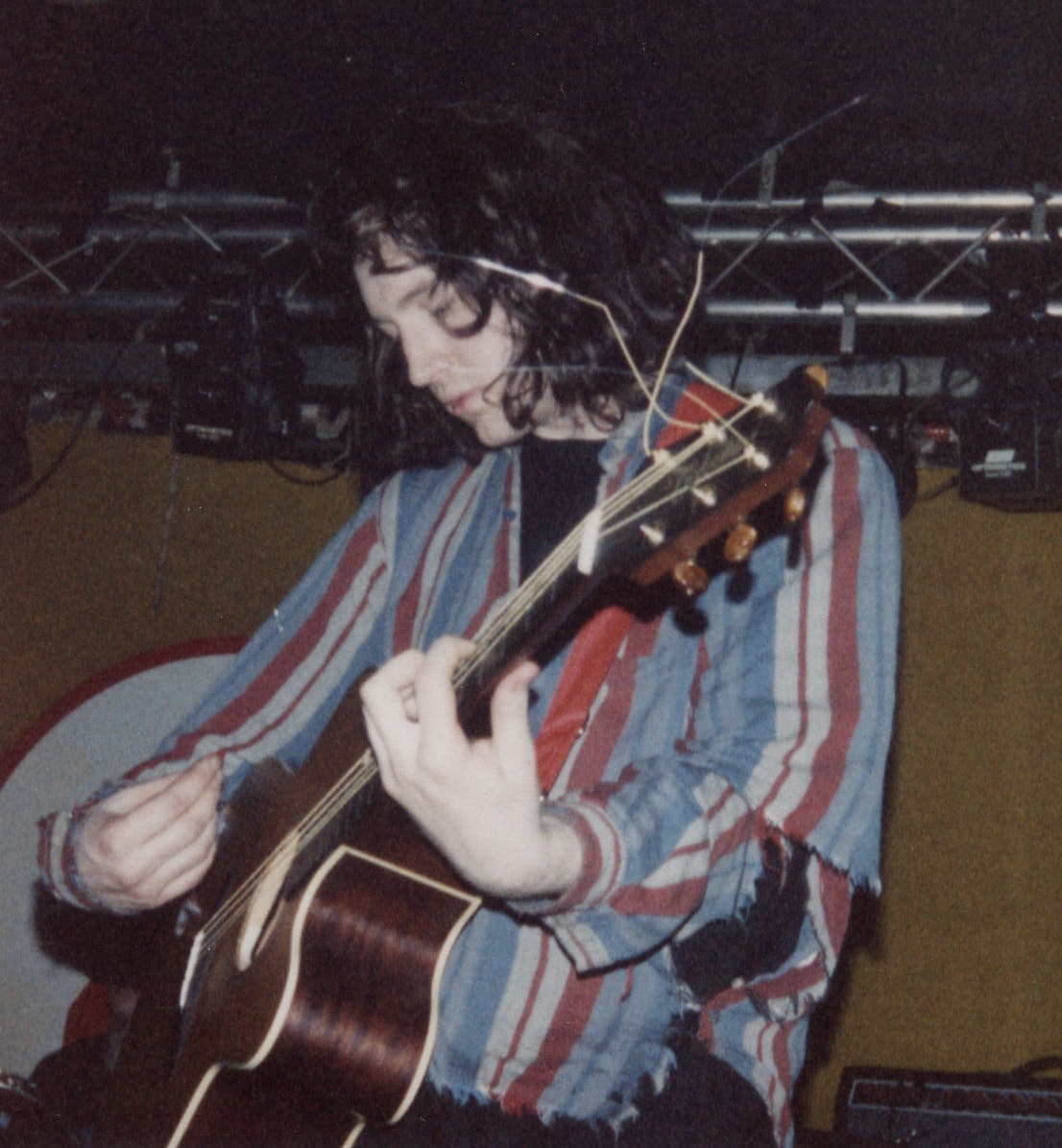
Kevin Shields (pictured in 1989) is the primary songwriter for My Bloody Valentine and solely composed all songs on m b v (2013).

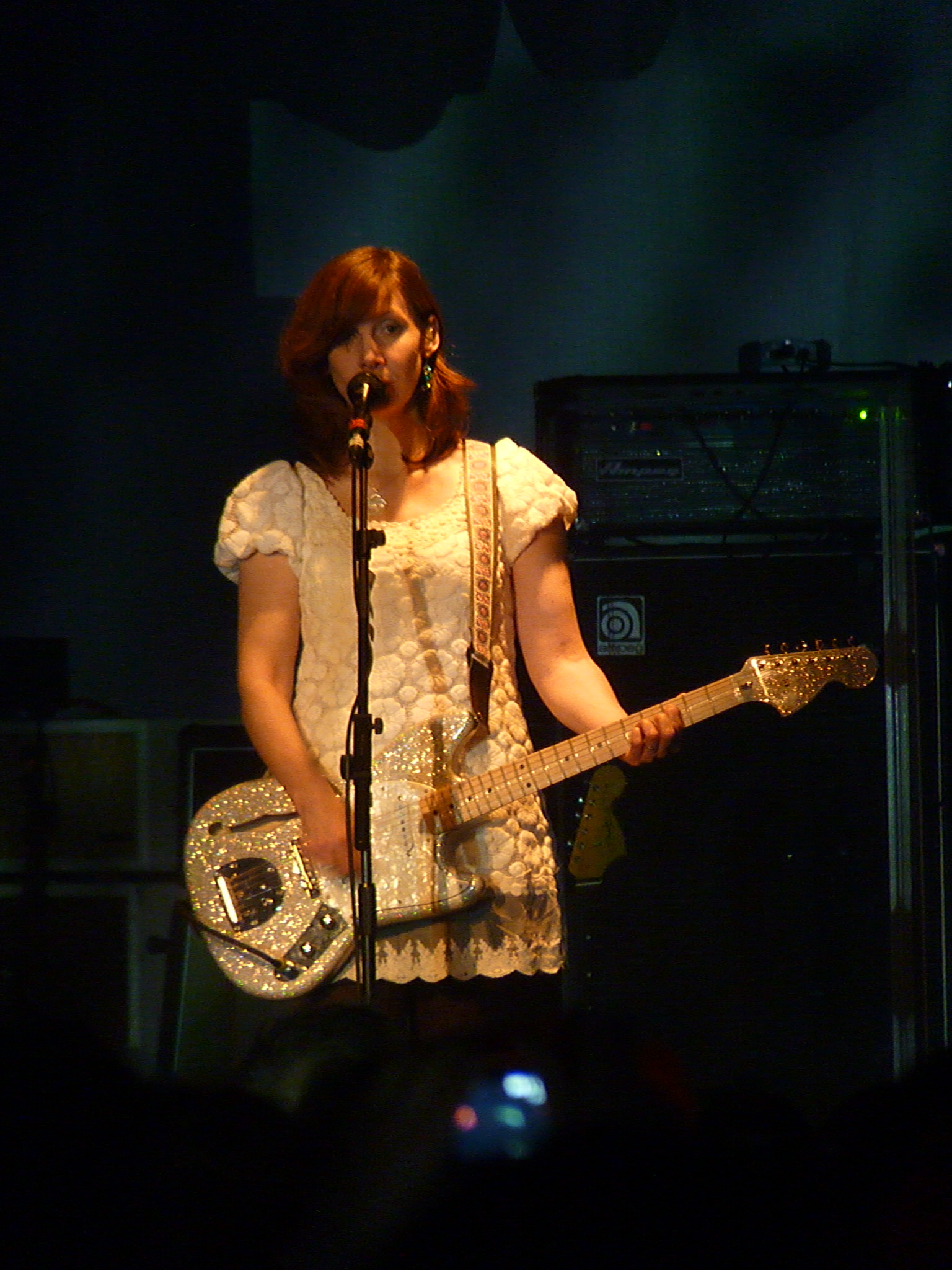
A third of the lyrics on Isn't Anything (1988) and Loveless (1991) were written by vocalist and guitarist Bilinda Butcher (pictured in 2009).

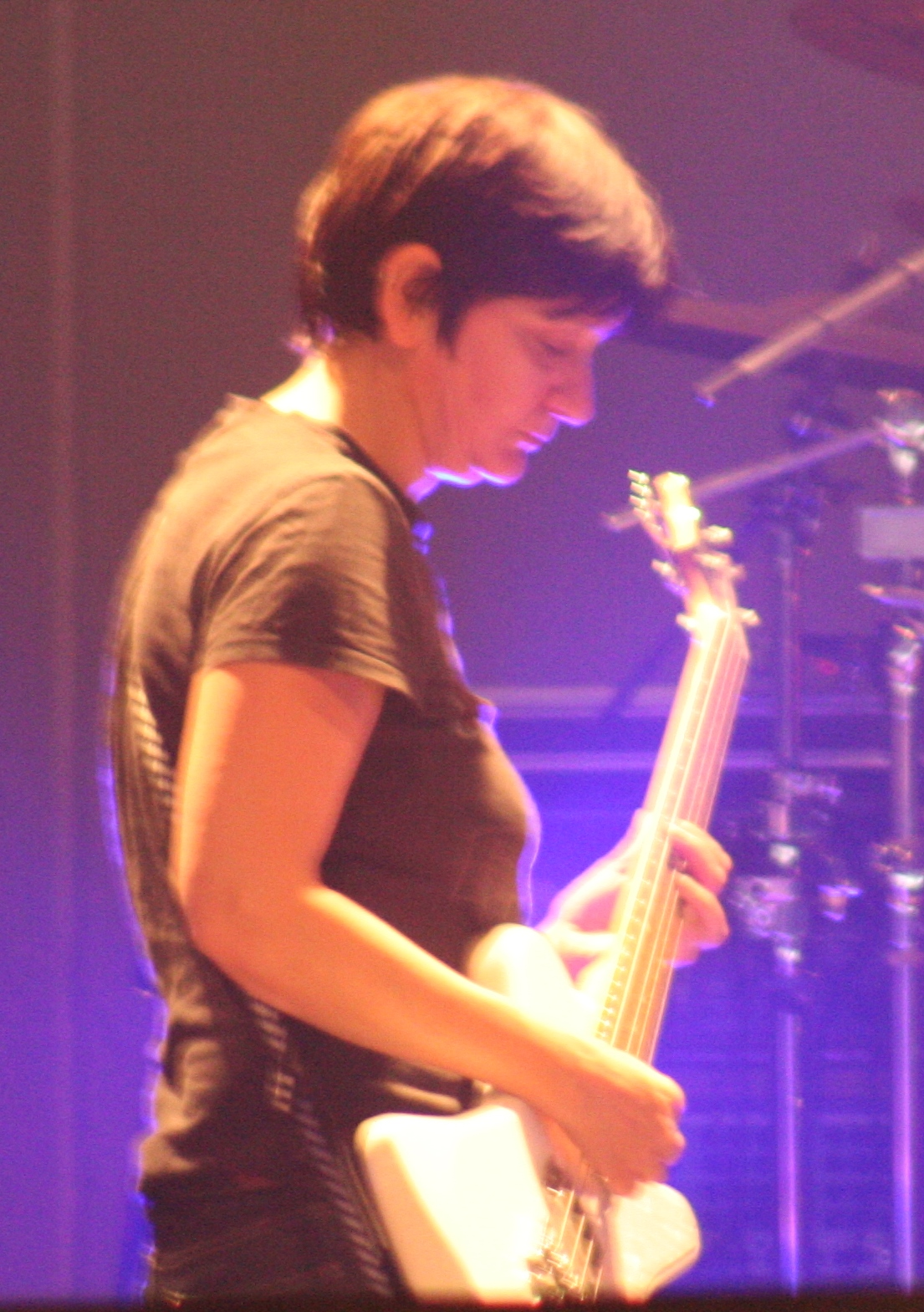
Bassist Debbie Googe (pictured in 2008) co-wrote one My Bloody Valentine song: "Never Say Goodbye", a b-side to "Strawberry Wine".

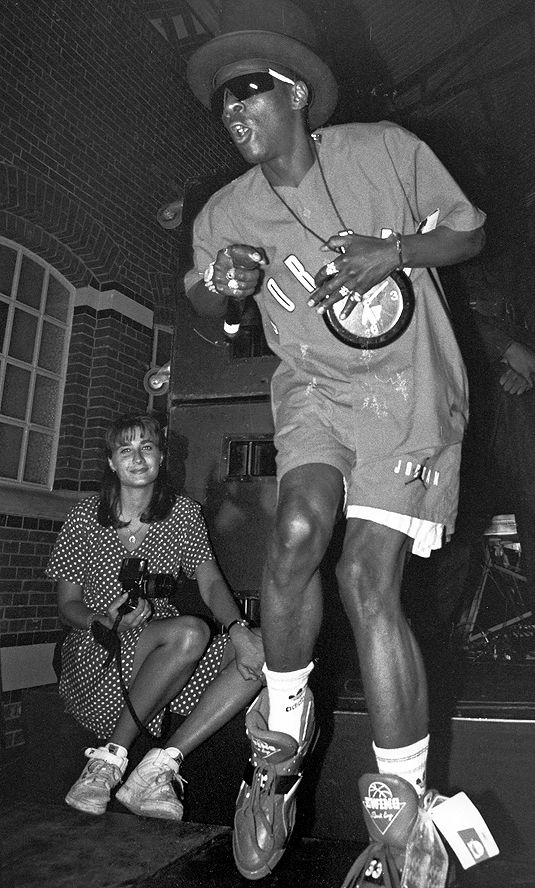
"Instrumental No 1" features a sample of "Security of the First World" by Public Enemy (vocalist Flavor Flav pictured in 1991).

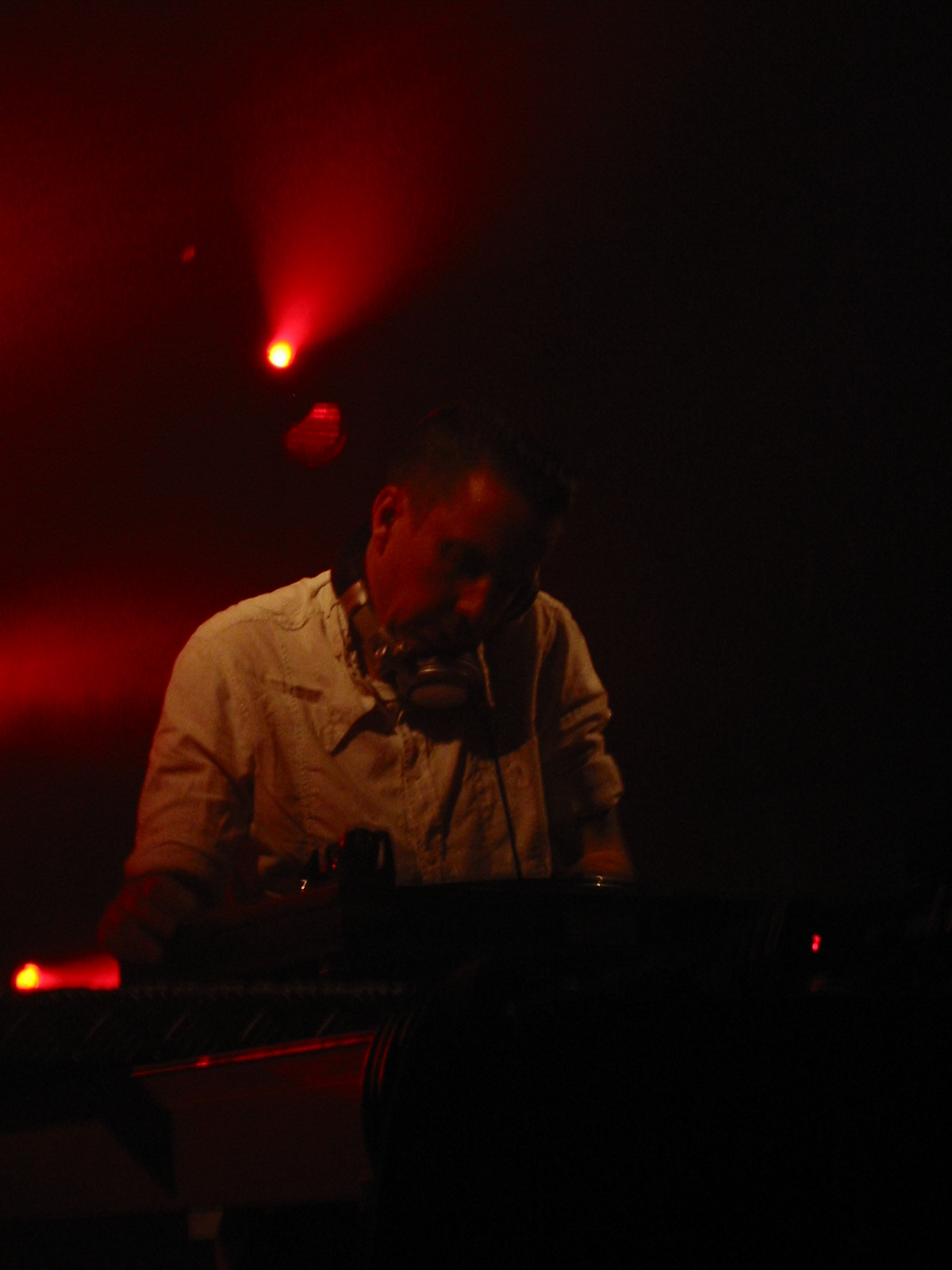
Andrew Weatherall (pictured in 2005) released a remixed version "Soon" on the "Glider E.P. Remixes" single in 1990.

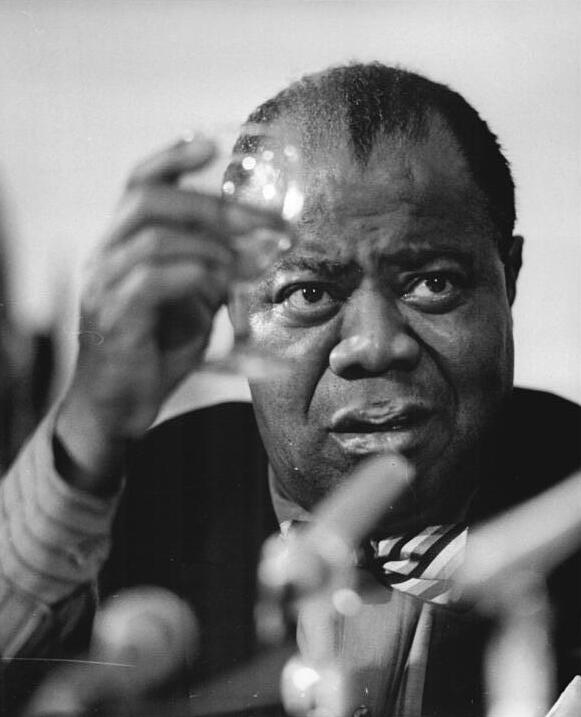
My Bloody Valentine contributed a cover version of "We Have All the Time in the World", performed by Louis Armstrong (pictured in 1965), to Peace Together in 1993.

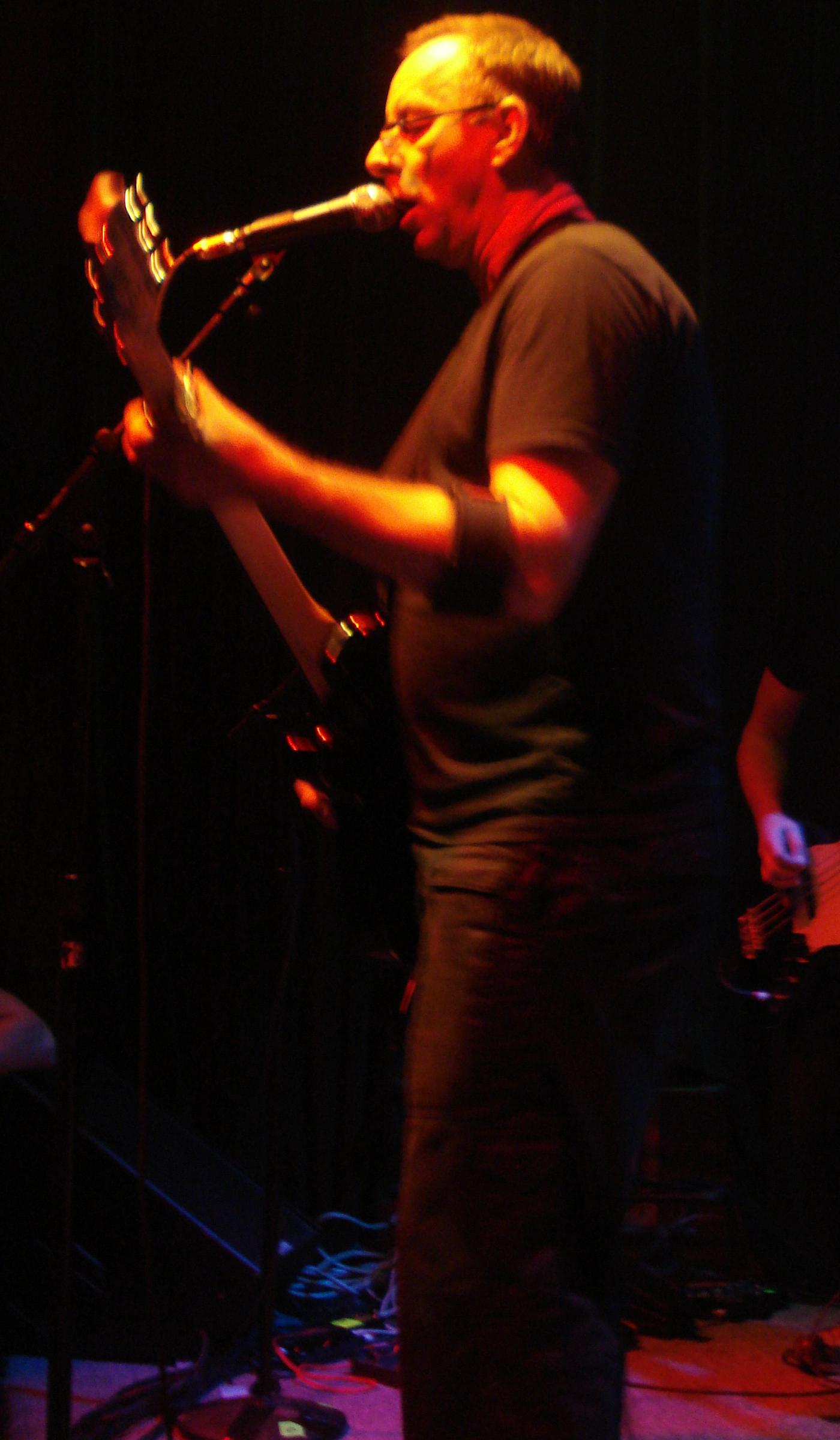
One of the band's final releases before their disbandment was a cover version of "Map Ref. 41°N 93°W" by Wire (vocalist and guitarist Colin Newman pictured in 2008)

Song	Writer(s)	Release	Year	Ref.
"A Town Called Bastard"	—	Man You Love to Hate – Live	1985	
"All I Need"	Kevin Shields	Isn't Anything	1988	
"Angel"	—	EP's 1988–1991	2012	
"Blown a Wish"	Bilinda Butcher; Kevin Shields	Loveless	1991	
"By the Danger in Your Eyes"	David Conway; Colm Ó Cíosóig; Kevin Shields	The New Record by My Bloody Valentine	1986	
"Can I Touch You"	Kevin Shields	"Strawberry Wine"	1987	
"Cigarette in Your Bed"	Kevin Shields	You Made Me Realise	1988	
"Clair"	Colm Ó Cíosóig; Kevin Shields	Ecstasy	1987	
"Come in Alone"	Kevin Shields	Loveless	1991	
"Cupid Come"	Bilinda Butcher; Kevin Shields	Isn't Anything	1988	
"Don't Ask Why"	Kevin Shields	Glider	1990	
"Don't Cramp My Style"	David Conway; Colm Ó Cíosóig; Kevin Shields	This Is Your Bloody Valentine	1985	
"Drive It All Over Me"	Bilinda Butcher; Colm Ó Cíosóig; Kevin Shields	You Made Me Realise	1988	
"Emptiness Inside"	Kevin Shields	"Feed Me with Your Kiss"	1988	
"Feed Me with Your Kiss" †	Kevin Shields	Isn't Anything	1988	
"Forever and Again"	David Conway; Colm Ó Cíosóig; Kevin Shields	This Is Your Bloody Valentine	1985	
"Glider"	Kevin Shields	Glider	1990	
"Good for You"	—	EP's 1988–1991	2012	
"Homelovin' Guy"	David Conway; Colm Ó Cíosóig; Kevin Shields	This Is Your Bloody Valentine	1985	
"Honey Power"	Bilinda Butcher; Kevin Shields	Tremolo	1991	
"How Do You Do It"	—	EP's 1988–1991	2012	
"I Believe"	Kevin Shields	"Feed Me with Your Kiss"	1988	
"I Can See It (But I Can't Feel It)"	Kevin Shields	Isn't Anything	1988	
"I Don't Need You"	Kevin Shields	Ecstasy	1987	
"I Need No Trust"	Kevin Shields	"Feed Me with Your Kiss"	1988	
"I Only Said"	Kevin Shields	Loveless	1991	
"If I Am"	Kevin Shields	m b v	2013	
"In Another Way"	Kevin Shields	m b v	2013	
"Incidental One" (Note: "Incidental One" features Mark Eitzel of American Music Club as a vocalist, reciting lyrics he wrote over music written by Kevin Shields.)	Mark Eitzel; Kevin Shields	Offbeat: A Red Hot Soundtrip	1996	
"Incidental Peace"	Kevin Shields	Offbeat: A Red Hot Soundtrip	1996	
"Inferno"	David Conway; Colm Ó Cíosóig; Kevin Shields	This Is Your Bloody Valentine	1985	
"Instrumental No 1" † (Note: "Instrumental No 1" was released as a non-album single originally titled "Instrumental" in 1988 and issued with the first 5,000 LP copies of Isn't Anything. It was retitled on the compilation album EP's 1988–1991 (2012).)	Kevin Shields	"Instrumental"	1988	
"Instrumental No 2"	Kevin Shields	"Instrumental"	1988	
"Is This and Yes"	Kevin Shields	m b v	2013	
"Kevin Song" (Note: "Kevin Song" remains unreleased although available on various bootlegs. It was planned for release on the compilation album EP's 1988–1991 (2012), but was excluded from the final track listing.)	—	—	—	
"Kiss the Eclipse"	David Conway; Kevin Shields	"Sunny Sundae Smile"	1987	
"Loomer"	Bilinda Butcher; Kevin Shields	Loveless	1991	
"Lose My Breath"	Bilinda Butcher; Kevin Shields	Isn't Anything	1988	
"Love Machine"	David Conway; Kevin Shields	Geek!	1985	
"Lovelee Sweet Darlene"	David Conway; Kevin Shields	The New Record by My Bloody Valentine	1986	
"Map Ref. 41°N 93°W" (Note: "Map Ref. 41°N 93°W" is a cover version of the Wire song, not an original composition.)	Bruce Clifford Gilbert; Graham Lewis; Colin Newman	Whore: Various Artists Play Wire	1996	
"Moon Song"	Kevin Shields	Tremolo	1991	
"Moonlight"	David Conway; Kevin Shields	Geek!	1985	
"Never Say Goodbye"	Debbie Googe; Colm Ó Cíosóig; Kevin Shields	"Strawberry Wine"	1987	
"New You"	Kevin Shields	m b v	2013	
"No More Sorry"	Bilinda Butcher; Kevin Shields	Isn't Anything	1988	
"No Place to Go" †	David Conway; Kevin Shields	Geek!	1985	
"Nothing Is"	Kevin Shields	m b v	2013	
"Nothing Much to Lose"	Kevin Shields	Isn't Anything	1988	
"Off Your Face"	Bilinda Butcher; Kevin Shields	Glider	1990	
"On Another Rainy Saturday"	David Conway; Kevin Shields	The New Record by My Bloody Valentine	1986	
"Only Shallow" #	Bilinda Butcher; Kevin Shields	Loveless	1991	
"Only Tomorrow"	Kevin Shields	m b v	2013	
"Paint a Rainbow"	David Conway; Kevin Shields	"Sunny Sundae Smile"	1987	
"(Please) Lose Yourself in Me"	Colm Ó Cíosóig; Kevin Shields	Ecstasy	1987	
"Scavengers"	—	Man You Love to Hate – Live	1985	
"Several Girls Galore"	Bilinda Butcher; Kevin Shields	Isn't Anything	1988	
"She Loves You No Less"	Kevin Shields	Ecstasy	1987	
"She Found Now"	Kevin Shields	m b v	2013	
"Slow"	Kevin Shields	You Made Me Realise	1988	
"Soft as Snow (But Warm Inside)" #	Colm Ó Cíosóig; Kevin Shields	Isn't Anything	1988	
"Sometimes"	Kevin Shields	Loveless	1991	
"Soon" †	Kevin Shields	Glider	1990	
"Soon" (The Andrew Weatherall Mix)	Kevin Shields	"Glider E.P. Remixes"	1990	
"Strawberry Wine" † (Note: An alternate mix of "Strawberry Wine" was later released on the compilation album Ecstasy and Wine (1989).)	Kevin Shields	"Strawberry Wine"	1987	
"Sueisfine"	Colm Ó Cíosóig; Kevin Shields	Isn't Anything	1988	
"Sugar" † (Note: "Sugar" was released as a split single with Pacific; the b-side, "December, with the Day", is not a My Bloody Valentine recording.)	Kevin Shields	"Sugar"/"December, with the Day"	1989	
"Sunny Sundae Smile" †	David Conway; Kevin Shields	"Sunny Sundae Smile"	1987	
"Swallow"	Kevin Shields	Tremolo	1991	
"Sylvie's Head"	David Conway; Kevin Shields	"Sunny Sundae Smile"	1987	
"The Devil Made Me Do It"	—	Man You Love to Hate – Live	1985	
"The Last Supper"	David Conway; Colm Ó Cíosóig; Kevin Shields	This Is Your Bloody Valentine	1985	
"The Love Gang"	David Conway; Colm Ó Cíosóig; Kevin Shields	This Is Your Bloody Valentine	1985	
"The Man You Love to Hate"	—	Man You Love to Hate – Live	1985	
"The Sandman Never Sleeps"	David Conway; Kevin Shields	Geek!	1985	
"The Things I Miss"	Colm Ó Cíosóig; Kevin Shields	Ecstasy	1987	
"Thorn"	Kevin Shields	You Made Me Realise	1988	
"Tiger in My Tank"	David Conway; Colm Ó Cíosóig; Kevin Shields	This Is Your Bloody Valentine	1985	
"To Here Knows When" †	Bilinda Butcher; Kevin Shields	Tremolo	1991	
"Touched"	Colm Ó Cíosóig	Loveless	1991	
"We Have All the Time in the World" (Note: "We Have All the Time in the World" is a cover of the Louis Armstrong song, not an original composition.)	John Barry; Hal David	Peace Together	1993	
"We're So Beautiful"	David Conway; Kevin Shields	The New Record by My Bloody Valentine	1986	
"What You Want"	Kevin Shields	Loveless	1991	
"When You Sleep" #	Bilinda Butcher; Kevin Shields	Loveless	1991	
"(When You Wake) You're Still in a Dream"	Colm Ó Cíosóig; Kevin Shields	Isn't Anything	1988	
"Who Sees You"	Kevin Shields	m b v	2013	
"Wonder 2"	Kevin Shields	m b v	2013	
"You Made Me Realise" †	Kevin Shields	You Made Me Realise	1988	
"You Never Should"	Kevin Shields	Isn't Anything	1988	
"(You're) Safe in Your Sleep (From This Girl)"	Kevin Shields	Ecstasy	1987	
"You've Got Nothing"	Kevin Shields	Ecstasy	1987	

== See also ==
- My Bloody Valentine discography
- Kevin Shields discography
