= My Bloody Valentine discography =

Irish alternative rock band discography

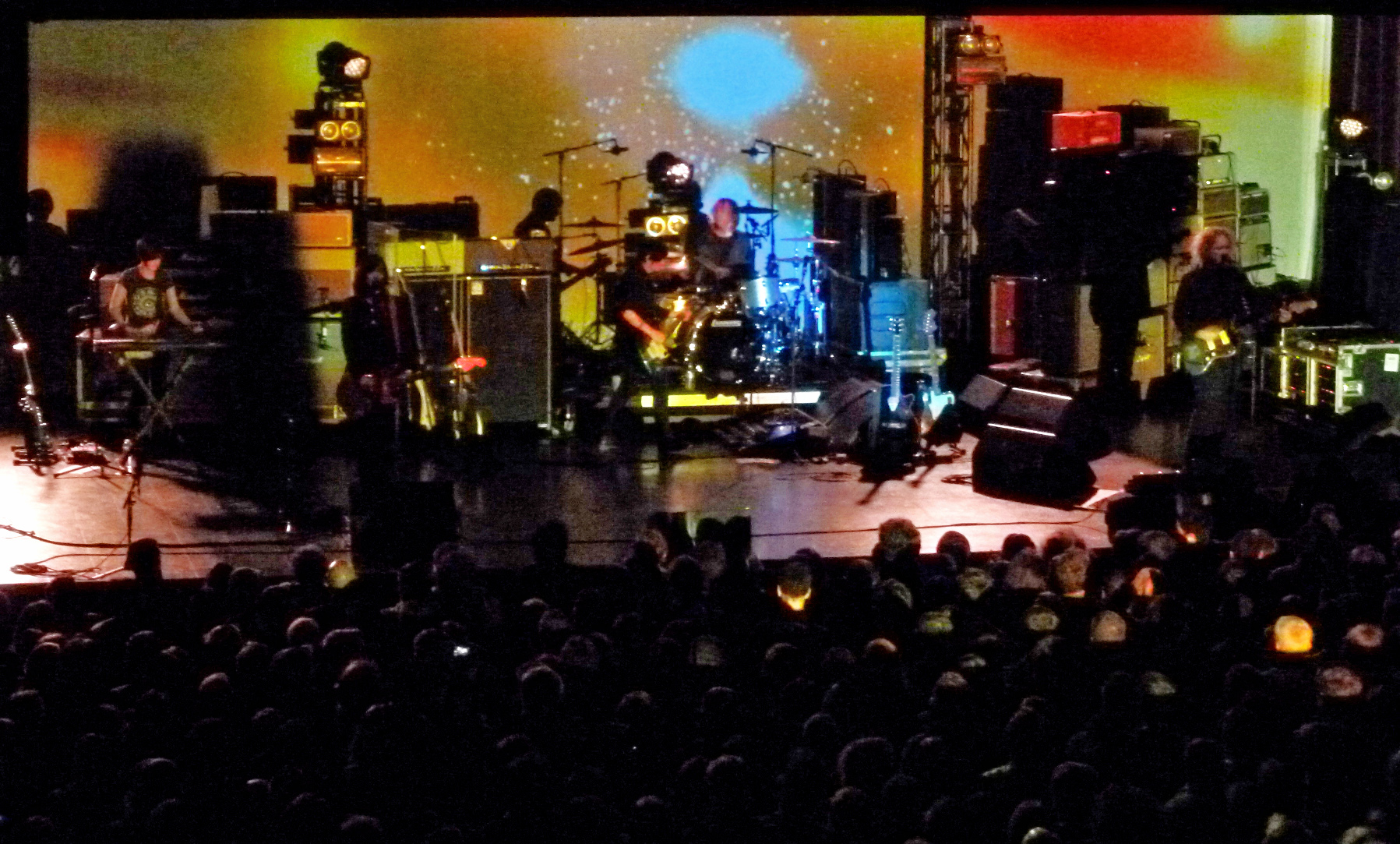
- My Bloody Valentine performing in Boston, Massachusetts, United States in November 2013
- Studio albums: 3
- Extended plays: 5
- Live albums: 1
- Compilation albums: 2
- Singles: 12
- Music videos: 6
- Mini albums: 2
- Compilation contributions: 4
- Miscellaneous appearances: 20

The discography of My Bloody Valentine, an Irish alternative rock band formed in Dublin, Ireland, consists of three studio albums, two mini albums, one live album, two compilation albums, five extended plays, twelve singles and six music videos.

My Bloody Valentine formed in early 1983 and released their debut mini album, This Is Your Bloody Valentine, in January 1985 on Tycoon Records. Featuring the band's original line-up of vocalist David Conway, guitarist Kevin Shields, drummer Colm Ó Cíosóig and keyboardist Christine "Tina" Durkin, the album failed to receive much attention and the band relocated to London, England following its release. In London the band recruited bassist Debbie Googe and subsequently released two EPs—Geek! (1985) and The New Record by My Bloody Valentine (1986)—and the 1987 single "Sunny Sundae Smile". The New Record… and "Sunny Sundae Smile" garnered the band minor underground success, with both placing in the United Kingdom Independent Singles Chart. Conway departed the band soon after and was replaced by vocalist-guitarist Bilinda Butcher in early 1987.

With their new line-up, My Bloody Valentine released a second mini album, Ecstasy, and the standalone single "Strawberry Wine" in November 1987 on Lazy Records. Both releases were moderate critical successes and attracted the attention of Creation Records co-founder Alan McGee, who offered the band a recording contract after a performance in January 1988. During their time on Creation My Bloody Valentine released their most notable material, including two full-length studio albums, Isn't Anything (1988) and Loveless (1991). Both albums, as well as their singles and preceding EPs, were released to widespread critical acclaim; Isn't Anything and Loveless were considered massive independent successes, both peaking at number 1 on the UK Independent Albums Chart. In addition, Loveless placed at number 24 on the UK Albums Chart and has since been certified gold by the British Phonographic Industry. In 1992 My Bloody Valentine were dropped by Creation due to the extensive recording period and production costs of Loveless.

My Bloody Valentine signed to Island Records in October 1992 for a reported £250,000 contract, constructing a home studio in Streatham, South London with their advance. Originally intending to record and release a third studio album, the band experienced a "semi-meltdown", according to Kevin Shields and became largely inactive. Despite rumours that over 60 hours of recorded material had been presented to Island, the band only released two songs—cover versions of Louis Armstrong's "We Have All the Time in the World" and Wire's "Map Ref 41°N 93°W"—on various artist compilation albums before their disbandment in 1997.

In 2007 My Bloody Valentine reunited and announced plans to release a third album. The band commenced two international tours between 2008 and 2009, during which time remastered versions of Isn't Anything and Loveless and a box set were announced. Following further delays, remastered editions of the band's original two studio albums and the double compilation album EP's 1988–1991 were released on Sony in May 2012. m b v, My Bloody Valentine's third studio album, was eventually released "out of the blue" in February 2013; it received "universal acclaim", according to Metacritic.

== Albums ==
=== Studio albums ===
List of studio albums; with chart positions, sales figures and certifications
Title	Album details	Peak chart positions								Sales	Certifications (sales thresholds)
Title	Album details	IRL	AUS	BEL	JPN	KOR	NLD	UK	UK Indie	Sales	Certifications (sales thresholds)
Isn't Anything	Released: 21 November 1988 (UK); Labels: Creation (040), Relativity (88561-1006); Formats: CD, CS LP	31	45	116	29	70	63	22	1		
Loveless	Released: 4 November 1991 (UK); Labels: Creation (060), Sire (9 26759); Formats: CD, CS, LP, MD	6	6	26	18	43	13	7	1	US: 290,000+	BPI: Gold
m b v	Released: 2 February 2013 (UK); Label: mbv (001); Formats: CD, digital download, LP	44	88	87	47	—	—	29	—		
"—" denotes a release that did not chart

=== Mini albums ===
List of mini albums, with chart positions
Title	Album details	Peak chart positions
Title	Album details	UK Indie
This Is Your Bloody Valentine	Released: January 1985 (GER); Label: Tycoon (7501); Formats: CD, LP	—
Ecstasy	Released: 23 November 1987 (UK); Label: Lazy (08); Format: LP	12
"—" denotes a release that did not chart

=== Live albums ===
List of live albums
Title	Album details
Man You Love to Hate – Live	Released: 1985 (GER); Label: Schuldige Scheitel (102); Format: CD, CS

=== Compilation albums ===
List of compilation albums, with chart positions
Title	Album details	Peak chart positions					
Title	Album details	IRL	BEL	JPN	KOR	UK	UK Indie
Ecstasy and Wine	Released: February 1989 (UK); Label: Lazy (12); Formats: CD, LP	—	—	—	—	—	2
EP's 1988–1991	Released: 4 May 2012 (IRL); Label: Sony (88691941692); Formats: 2×CD, BSCD, digital download	21	189	17	69	33	—
"—" denotes a release that did not chart

== Extended plays ==
List of extended plays, with chart positions
Title	Album details	Peak chart positions
Title	Album details	UK Indie
Geek!	Released: December 1985 (UK); Label: Fever (005); Format: 12"	—
The New Record by My Bloody Valentine	Released: September 1986 (UK); Label: Kaleidoscope Sound (101); Format: 12"	22
Ecstasy	Released: 23 November 1987 (UK); Label: Creation (055); Formats: 12", CD	24
You Made Me Realise	Released: 8 August 1988 (UK); Label: Creation (055); Formats: 12", CD	2
Feed Me with Your Kiss	Released: 31 October 1988 (UK); Label: Creation (061); Formats: 12", CD	—
Glider	Released: 23 April 1990 (UK); Label: Creation (073); Formats: 12", CD	2
Tremolo	Released: 4 February 1991 (UK); Label: Creation (085); Formats: 12", CD	1
"—" denotes releases that did not chart

== Singles ==
=== Retail singles ===
List of retail singles, with chart positions
Single	Year	Peak chart positions			Album
Single	Year	UK	UK Indie	US Alt	Album
"No Place to Go"	1985	—	—	—	Geek!
"Sunny Sundae Smile"	1987	168	6	—	non-album single
"Strawberry Wine"	1987	—	13	—	non-album single
"You Made Me Realise"	1988	107	5	—	non-album single
"Feed Me with Your Kiss"	1988	118	2	—	Isn't Anything
"Instrumental"	1988	—	—	—	non-album single
"Soon"	1990	41	—	—	Loveless
"To Here Knows When"	1991	29	—	—	Loveless
"Only Shallow"	1992	—	—	27	Loveless
"—" denotes releases that did not chart

=== Promotional singles ===
List of promotional-only singles
Single	Year	Album	Ref
"Soft as Snow (But Warm Inside)"	1988	Isn't Anything	
"When You Sleep"	1991	Loveless	

=== Split singles ===
List of split singles, with other artists
Single	Year	Other artist
"Sugar"/"December, with the Day"	1989	Pacific

== Music videos ==
List of music videos, with directors
Title	Year	Director	Ref
"You Made Me Realise"	1988	Douglas Hart	
"Feed Me with Your Kiss"	1988	Douglas Hart	
"Soon"	1990	Angus Cameron	
"To Here Knows When"	1991	Angus Cameron	
"Swallow"	1991	Angus Cameron	
"Only Shallow"	1991	Angus Cameron	

== Compilation contributions ==
List of contributions to various artist compilations
Song	Year	Album	Notes	Ref
"We Have All the Time in the World"	1993	Peace Together	Louis Armstrong cover	
"Incidental One" (with Mark Eitzel)	1996	Offbeat: A Red Hot Soundtrip	N/A	
"Incidental Peace" (with Skylab)	1996	Offbeat: A Red Hot Soundtrip	N/A	
"Map Ref 41°N 93°W"	1996	Whore: Various Artists Play Wire	Wire cover	

== Miscellaneous appearances ==
List of appearances on compilation albums, and film and television soundtracks
Song	Year	Album	Notes	Ref
"Love Machine"	1986	Turn It Up_..or Turn It Off	From Geek!	
"No Place to Go"	1986	Turn It Up_..or Turn It Off	From Geek!	
"Strawberry Wine"	1988	Indie Top 20 Volume III – War of Independents	N/A	
"Cigarette in Your Bed"	1988	Doing It for the Kids	From You Made Me Realise	
"When You Wake You're Still in a Dream"	1989	Rough Trade: Music for the 90's	From Isn't Anything	
"Instrumental"	1990	Pensioners on Ecstasy	N/A	
"Soon"	1990	Just Say Da: Volume IV of Just Say Yes	EP version, from Glider	
"Honey Power"	1991	Sorted, Snorted and Sported	From Tremolo	
"Honey Power"	1991	Just Say Anything: Volume V of Just Say Yes	From Tremolo	
"Soon"	1992	Precious (Underground)	From Glider and Loveless	
"Only Shallow" (Edit)	1992	Rollercoaster EP	From Loveless	
"Only Shallow"	1995	Amateur	From Loveless	
"Soon"	1996	Noise Annoys: A Creation Compilation	From Glider and Loveless	
"Loomer"	1996	Ocean of Sound	From Loveless	
"Sometimes"	2003	Lost in Translation	From Loveless	
"Paint a Rainbow"	2004	Rough Trade Shops: Indiepop	From the B-side of "Sunny Sundae Smile"	
"Only Shallow"	2005	Whatever: The '90s Pop & Culture Box	From Loveless	
"Soon"	2005	Just Say Sire: The Sire Records Story	From Glider and Loveless	
"Only Shallow"	2007	The Brit Box: UK Indie, Shoegaze, and Brit-Pop Gems of the Last Millennium	From Loveless	
"Only Tomorrow"	2013	The Sound of 2013	From m b v	
