= You Made Me Realise =

EP by My Bloody Valentine
- Released: 8 August 1988
- Recorded: January 1988
- Genres: Shoegaze; noise rock; dream pop
- Length: 17:06
- Label: Creation
- Producer: My Bloody Valentine

My Bloody Valentine chronology
| Ecstasy (1987) | You Made Me Realise (1988) | Feed Me with Your Kiss (1988) |

Singles from You Made Me Realise
- 1. "You Made Me Realise" Released: 8 August 1988

You Made Me Realise (stylized in lowercase) is the third extended play by the Irish rock band My Bloody Valentine, released in the United Kingdom on 8 August 1988. After the troubled production of Ecstasy (1987), the band were invited by record executive Alan McGee to release music under Creation Records. The EP was then recorded within a week in January 1988, during which vocalist and guitarist Kevin Shields wrote most of its songs. The band recorded in a small Walthamstow studio provided by McGee and handled production by themselves. The EP blends the shoegaze, noise rock and dream pop genres, which were inspired by musicians Thurston Moore and J Mascis, while Shields was influenced by his smoking cannabis.

You Made Me Realise entered the UK Indie Chart at number two and was praised by the independent music press for My Bloody Valentine developing their sound. One single from the EP was released, "You Made Me Realise", which reached number 107 on the UK singles chart. The success of the record allowed the band to create six more releases for Creation throughout the late 1980s and early 1990s.

== Recording ==
From 1983 to 1986, My Bloody Valentine were signed to four independent record labels and underwent several membership changes. The band signed with Lazy Records in early 1987 and employed Bilinda Butcher as a replacement vocalist for David Conway, who left the band after becoming disillusioned with music. Butcher began sharing lead vocals with guitarist Kevin Shields and learnt to play guitar.

Before My Bloody Valentine could stabilize their new lineup, they faced pressure from Lazy to produce new records. This led to the releases of "Strawberry Wine", a standalone single, and Ecstasy, a mini album, in 1987. Both works received some positive reviews, although Ecstacy was plagued by technical problems and financial limitations. This led to the band leaving Lazy in late 1987, leaving them without a label for the remainder of the year.

In early 1988, the band was noticed by record executive Alan McGee while performing in Canterbury. McGee invited them to record and release music for his label Creation. You Made Me Realise was then conceived and recorded at a studio in Walthamstow in under a week. The model on the cover is a mutual friend of My Bloody Valentine and Lush, who is commonly mistaken as Butcher.

== Music ==
You Made Me Realise is a shoegaze record that blends elements of noise rock and dream pop, marking a change in direction from the band's previous releases. Inspirations for the record include Sonic Youth's Thurston Moore and Dinosaur Jr.'s J Mascis, who influenced Shields's guitar playing. He also evolved his use of reverse reverb, which he experimented with on "Strawberry Wine" and Ecstasy but "to no great consequence, because I was using it the way it was meant to be used." He also credited starting to smoke cannabis, which he had done for six months prior to the EP's conception, as an influence.

Shields performs lead vocals on the first three songs of You Made Me Realise, and Butcher sings lead on the final two tracks. Shields wrote most of its lyrics with the exception of "Drive It All Over Me", which were penned by Butcher and drummer Colm Ó Cíosóig. It includes references to romance, sadomasochism, sexual intercourse and suicide. Its title track "You Made Me Realise" became infamous for its noise section, often referred to as the "holocaust" section.

== Release ==
You Made Me Realise was released by Creation on 8 August 1988. The title track was released as a single that same day, and limited to 1,000 copies. It aided in the success of the EP, reaching 107 on the UK singles chart and five on the UK indie chart. Two promotional music videos were directed by ex-Jesus and Mary Chain bassist Douglas Hart. Without My Bloody Valentine's consent, Mercury reissued You Made Me Realise and the band's following EP Feed Me with Your Kiss as a bundle in 1989. You Made Me Realise was remastered for the compilation album EP's 1988–1991, which was released in 2012.

== Reception and legacy ==
Professional ratings
Review scores
| Source | Rating |
|---|---|
| AllMusic | 4.5/5 stars |

You Made Me Realise received positive reviews from critics. Nitsuh Abebe of AllMusic wrote that the EP "made critics stand up and take notice of the brilliant things My Bloody Valentine were up to [...] it developed some of the stunning guitar sounds that would become the band's trademark." Spin's Simon Reynolds called the record "astonishing". Daniel Harrison of Slate said it demonstrated "a massive step-up" for the band. Pitchfork's Mark Richardson opined that You Made Me Realise "is a perennial on any list of the greatest EPs of all time and it vastly improves upon their earlier work. [...] They were finally a real rock band, with pulsing bass and brisk tempos and guitars that sound like guitars." Alexis Petridis included all of the tracks from You Made Me Realise in The Guardian's list of the band's 20 greatest songs, with "You Made Me Realise" ranking highest at number two. Writers at Paste rated it the ninth greatest EP ever made, going so far to say that it was "the best thing" they ever released.

The EP's title track became a staple of My Bloody Valentine's live repertoire. During the band's performances, they repeat a single chord from the holocaust section for as long as they felt bearable, as the song descending into cacophony. It usually lasts around 15 minutes, although there are reports of shows where it went on for well over half an hour. Peter Kember, then of Spacemen 3, recalled seeing the band play "You Made Me Realise" at a live performance at the Roadmender in Northampton in 1988, after My Bloody Valentine had supported the Pixies on the latter's first European tour: "They’d transformed. I don't know quite what had happened, but sometimes bands hit a certain quantum shift. The noise was overwhelming".

== Track listing ==
All lyrics are written by Kevin Shields, except "Drive It All Over Me", written by Bilinda Butcher and Colm Ó Cíosóig; all music is composed by Shields.

You Made Me Realise track listing
| No. | Title | Lead vocals | Length |
|---|---|---|---|
| 1. | "You Made Me Realise" | Shields | 3:46 |
| 2. | "Slow" | Shields | 3:11 |
| 3. | "Thorn" | Shields | 3:36 |
| 4. | "Cigarette in Your Bed" | Butcher | 3:29 |
| 5. | "Drive It All Over Me" | Butcher | 3:04 |

Notes

- On some releases, every song's title is stylized in all lowercase letters. For example, "Slow" is stylized as "slow". Other releases use regular title case for the song titles.

== Personnel ==
All personnel credits adapted from You Made Me Realise's liner notes.

My Bloody Valentine

- Kevin Shields – guitar, vocals
- Bilinda Butcher – guitar, vocals
- Debbie Googe – bass
- Colm Ó Cíosóig – drums

Technical personnel

- My Bloody Valentine – production

== Charts ==
Chart performance for You Made Me Realise
| Chart (1988) | Peak position |
|---|---|
| UK Indie Chart | 2 |
