= Ecstasy (My Bloody Valentine album) =

EP by My Bloody Valentine
- Released: 23 November 1987
- Recorded: July 1987
- Genre: Alternative rock; noise pop; jangle pop
- Length: 20:48
- Label: Lazy
- Producer: My Bloody Valentine

My Bloody Valentine chronology
The New Record by My Bloody Valentine (1986)	Ecstasy (1987)	You Made Me Realise (1988)

Ecstasy is the second mini album by the alternative rock band My Bloody Valentine, released on 23 November 1987 on Lazy Records. Released in a limited edition of 3,000 copies, it was the band's final release for Lazy Records and second to feature vocalist and guitarist Bilinda Butcher, who was recruited in April 1987 following the departure of original My Bloody Valentine vocalist David Conway. Ecstasy followed the noise pop and twee pop standards set by My Bloody Valentine's earlier releases for the label, drawing influence from various artists including The Jesus and Mary Chain, Love and The Byrds, and the album distanced the band further from their earlier post-punk and gothic rock sound.

The album experienced several technical and financial problems during its recording sessions, including errors in the mastering process, and the band were dissatisfied with its outcome; although upon its release, Ecstasy received moderate critical acclaim and peaked at number 12 on the UK Independent Albums Chart. The album was later combined with My Bloody Valentine's preceding single, "Strawberry Wine", and reissued on the compilation album Ecstasy and Wine (1989), which was released on Lazy Records without the band's consent.

== Background ==
Following minor success on the underground scene after the release of The New Record by My Bloody Valentine (1986) and 1987's "Sunny Sundae Smile", original My Bloody Valentine vocalist David Conway left the band due to a gastric illness, disillusionment with music and his ambitions to become a writer. The remaining members—guitarist Kevin Shields, drummer Colm Ó Cíosóig and bassist Debbie Googe—considered splitting up and forming a new band under a different name. However, the band placed advertisements for a vocalist in the local music press in London, which Shields referred to later as "pointless, … disastrous and excrutiating [sic]" due to the advertisements attracting a number of Morrissey inspired vocalists who he referred to as "fruitballs". Through mutual friends the band recruited two vocalists, Joe Byfield and Bilinda Butcher. After performing one show in April 1987 with both on vocals, My Bloody Valentine considered Byfield "unsuitable" for the band and he was subsequently fired. Butcher, whose prior musical experience had been playing classical guitar as a child, and singing and playing tambourine "with some girlfriends for fun", was chosen as My Bloody Valentine's new vocalist and began rehearsing with the band in the middle of 1987.

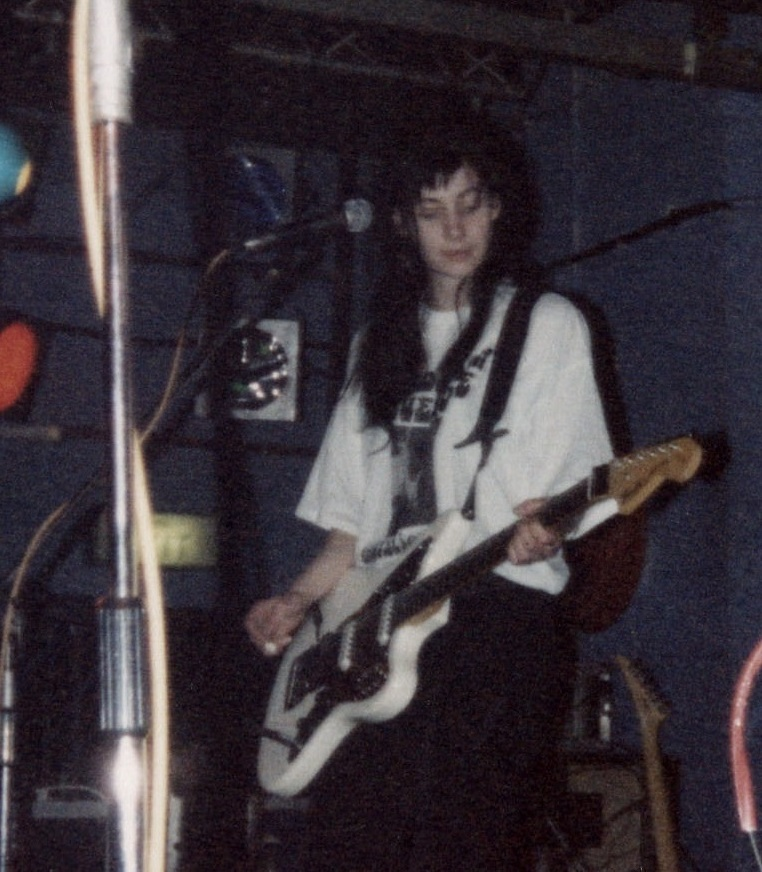
Ecstasy was the band's second release to feature vocalist and guitarist Bilinda Butcher (pictured in 1989), who was recruited in April 1987.

Lazy Records, on which the band released "Sunny Sundae Smile", requested a full-length album from My Bloody Valentine during summer 1987. The band refused the label's request, claiming their newly formed line-up "had only been together a couple of months and hadn't really had time to get settled". However, the band compromised and agreed to record a mini album, provided they could release a single beforehand. The preceding single, "Strawberry Wine", was released on 9 November 1987 and peaked at number 13 on the UK Independent Singles Chart.

== Recording ==
The recording sessions for Ecstasy took place a week after the recording sessions for "Strawberry Wine". My Bloody Valentine spent a total of 10 days recording the album. According to Kevin Shields, the sessions "had no direction and [the band] didn't even know what [they] were doing" and "bashed out all these tunes quickly, very demo-like". A number of songs were recorded that did not feature on the final release, as the band considered them "awful". However, the sessions were "the first time [the band had] actually played around properly in the studio", which resulted in "extreme" and "quite nasty" guitar sounds, which My Bloody Valentine would later become associated with.

Ecstasy's recording was plagued by technical and financial errors, which impacted the eventual release of the album. The mastering process was affected by the album's engineer Steve Nunn, who mislaid the source material of the final mix prior to its transfer to the master recording. Shields subsequently "brought an independent engineer in to the studios to point out what was wrong" but Lazy Records refused to invest further finances into the album's recording process. As a result, "much of what was originally the sound of Ecstacy [sic] was lost, and much of the tone was dulled" and the album "showed a group who appeared to have run out of money half way through recording".

== Composition ==
All of Ecstasy's seven tracks were written and composed by Kevin Shields, with Colm Ó Cíosóig credited as the co-writer of three tracks—"The Things I Miss", "Clair" and "(Please) Lose Yourself in Me". Regarding the lyrical content of the album in contrast to the music, Shields said that "the songs may sound sweet, but the subject matter isn't necessarily very nice. A lot of it is relationship-based, but it's always vague, and never just boy-meets-girl. It could easily be boy-meets-boy, or girl-meets-girl. Then there's hate, and whimsical thoughts you get from nowhere". Ó Cíosóig remarked that "it's more weird perversions of feeling you get in a relationship" and referred to the lyrics as being marked by "extremes, because we're entertained by extreme things". Shields noted that the lyrics were a progression from the band's earlier releases as "the idea of composing a sweet pop song that sugar-coated some lyrical horror and sending it hurtling up the charts appealed to our sense of humour" and considered the songwriting process for Ecstasy as "fresh after having made pure noise earlier".

"Clair"
"Clair" demonstrated the band's noise pop sound, which was influenced by The Jesus and Mary Chain.

My Bloody Valentine experimented with a noise pop sound on the album, a venture which was influenced by The Jesus and Mary Chain, and incorporated elements of twee pop similar to "Strawberry Wine". Shields used a twelve-string electric guitar during the Ecstasy's recording sessions and was influenced by The Byrds during the writing process, which resulted in the guitar tones being "too jingly jangly". Writer Colin Larkin described Ecstasy's sound as "bubblegum pop with buzzsaw guitars", which was similar to their prior releases and further diverged from their earlier post-punk and gothic rock sound. Jim DeRogatis noted that Ecstasy's overall sound "ushered in a sunnier, more optimistic vibe" for the band which was reminiscent of the sound of 1960s American psychedelia, in particular the Los Angeles based band Love. "Clair", one of the first recordings to feature Bilinda Butcher, features a sampled tape loop of audience screams from The Beatles' live album, The Beatles at the Hollywood Bowl (1977). The sample was processed through audio filters to emulate guitar feedback.

However, the music on Ecstasy has been criticised as being "directionless and floundered about within the framework of songs which appeared to be only half formed ideas," which was due to the band's in-studio experimentation with different aspects of their guitar sound. In hindsight, Shields said that "even when we'd finished it we didn't like half the songs we'd done. The record never came out right and it made us realise that we were still too twee". In response to the band's "unwanted reputation for jangly feyness", My Bloody Valentine later incorporated elements of American indie rock music and Shields customised his guitars' tremolo systems, resulting in the band pioneering an alternative rock subgenre known as shoegazing. The term "shoegazing", which was considered derogatory, was coined by Sounds journalists in the early 1990s to describe certain bands' "motionless performing style, where they stood on stage and stared at the floor".

== Release and reception ==
Professional ratings
Review scores
Source	Rating
New Musical Express	9/10

Ecstasy was released on 23 November 1987 on Lazy Records. It received a limited edition release of 3,000 LP copies distributed by Rough Trade Records and went out of print within three months of its release. The album entered the UK Independent Albums Chart in December 1987 and spent four weeks in total on the chart, peaking at number 12. The contents of the album were later combined with the band's preceding single, "Strawberry Wine", and reissued on the compilation album Ecstasy and Wine, released in February 1989 on Lazy Records. Ecstasy and Wine, however, was released without the band's consent and Kevin Shields retrieved 10,000 LP copies from the manager of Lazy Records soon after its release. Shields sold the records to various distributors in the early 1990s, after My Bloody Valentine were dropped from Creation Records, and used the funds to finance later recording sessions.

Upon its release Ecstasy received moderate critical acclaim. Melody Maker referred to the album as "a series of aloof, pastel washes of sound, suspended guitars, words from the back of beyond tying in to a large, shifting whole" and "larger than the sum of its parts". In Loveless, a book from the 33 1/3 series about the My Bloody Valentine album of the same name, Mike McGonial referred to Ecstasy as a "rarified, effete and poppy approach to Byrdsian rock" and AllMusic rated the album two and a half out of five stars. In a separate review of Ecstasy and Wine, AllMusic writer Bradley Torreano described Ecstasy as the point where the band "started moving toward Cocteau Twins territory, using guitarist Bilinda Butcher's airy voice to define their image" and when "Shields and Butcher [were] exploring the guitar landscapes that would later become their trademark".

On Ecstasy's supporting tour My Bloody Valentine conceived the idea of an interlude of white noise during live performances which was later attributed to their song "You Made Me Realise" and often exceeded 130 decibels. The band toured small student venues and, according to Kevin Shields, at "one particular place, there were these guy playing pool in the background, shouting amongst themselves and being quite loud and not paying attention". Before performing "Clair", Shields said to the band "let's just do it until those guys stop" and performed a two-chord riff in the song that lasted for an approximate 30 minutes.

== Track listing ==
All tracks are written by Kevin Shields unless otherwise noted.

Side one
No.	Title	Lyrics	Music	Length
1.	"She Loves You No Less"			2:34
2.	"The Things I Miss"	Shields, Ó Cíosóig	Shields, Ó Cíosóig	2:56
3.	"I Don't Need You"			3:07
4.	"(You're) Safe in Your Sleep (From This Girl)"			2:31

Side two
No.	Title	Lyrics	Music	Length
5.	"Clair"	Shields, Ó Cíosóig	Shields	2:34
6.	"You've Got Nothing"			3:40
7.	"(Please) Lose Yourself in Me"	Shields, Ó Cíosóig	Shields	3:26
Total length:				20:48

== Personnel ==
All personnel credits adapted from Ecstasy's liner notes.

My Bloody Valentine

- Kevin Shields – vocals, guitar
- Bilinda Butcher – vocals, guitar
- Debbie Googe – bass
- Colm Ó Cíosóig – drums

Additional musicians

- Nick Brown – violin on "Clair"

Technical personnel

- My Bloody Valentine – production
- Steve Nunn – engineering
- Lucy Smith – photography

== Chart positions ==
Chart (1987)	Peak position
UK Independent Albums Chart	12
