= No Place to Go =

No Place to Go may refer to:

== Film ==
- No Place to Go (1927 film), a romance starring Mary Astor
- No Place to Go (1939 film), a drama featuring Dennis Morgan
- No Place to Go (2000 film), a German film

== Music ==
- "No Place to Go" (song), a 1985 song by My Bloody Valentine
- "No Place to Go", a 2002 song by Axium from Matter of Time
- "No Place to Go", a 1968 song by Fleetwood Mac from Fleetwood Mac

== See also ==
- "No Particular Place to Go", a song by Chuck Berry
- A Place to Go, a 1963 British crime drama
