= No Place to Go (song) =

Single by My Bloody Valentine

from the EP Geek!
- B-side: "Moonlight"
- Released: 1985
- Recorded: October 1985 at Silent Studio in London, United Kingdom
- Genre: Post-punk
- Length: 3:20
- Label: Fever
- Songwriter(s): David Conway, Kevin Shields
- Producer(s): My Bloody Valentine

My Bloody Valentine singles chronology
"No Place to Go" (1985)	"Sunny Sundae Smile" (1987)

"No Place to Go" is a song by the alternative rock band My Bloody Valentine. It is the opening track and lead single from the band's debut extended play, Geek!, released in December 1985 on Fever Records. Featuring lyrics by vocalist David Conway and music by guitarist Kevin Shields, "No Place to Go" is considered the standout song on Geek!, although Shields later referred to it as an "absolute failure" and "unrepresentative of what [My Bloody Valentine] wanted to do."

== Track listing ==
All lyrics written by David Conway, all music composed by Kevin Shields.

UK 7" single (Fever Records, FEV 005X)

1. "No Place to Go" – 3:20
2. "Moonlight" – 3:20

== Personnel ==
All personnel credits adapted from "No Place to Go"'s liner notes.

My Bloody Valentine

- David Conway – vocals
- Kevin Shields – guitar, vocals
- Debbie Googe – bass
- Colm Ó Cíosóig – drums

Technical personnel

- My Bloody Valentine – production
- Martin Pavey – engineering
