= Sunny Sundae Smile =

Single by My Bloody Valentine
- B-side: "Paint a Rainbow"/"Kiss the Eclipse/"Sylvie's Head"
- Released: February 1987
- Recorded: December 1986 at Alaska Studios in London, United Kingdom
- Genre: Alternative rock, noise pop
- Length: 2:30
- Label: Lazy
- Songwriter(s): David Conway, Kevin Shields
- Producer(s): My Bloody Valentine

My Bloody Valentine singles chronology
"No Place to Go" (1985)	"Sunny Sundae Smile" (1987)	"Strawberry Wine" (1987)

"Sunny Sundae Smile" is a song by the alternative rock band My Bloody Valentine. It was released as a non-album single in February 1987 on Lazy Records. Recorded at Alaska Studios in London, "Sunny Sundae Smile" was the band's first release on Lazy Records and the final release to feature original vocalist David Conway.

Less than 2,000 copies of the 7-inch single were pressed and the 12-inch single received a limited release of 2,000 copies. Allmusic writer Nitsuh Abebe described "Sunny Sundae Smile" as "pop melodies revved up by sheets and sheets of Jesus and Mary Chain-style guitar noise" and added that "somewhere in there, though, you can hear the beginnings of the lighter, more distinct sound that characterized Ecstasy and 'Strawberry Wine'." Upon its release, "Sunny Sundae Smile" peaked at number 6 on the UK Independent Singles Chart.

== Track listing ==
All songs written by David Conway and Kevin Shields.

UK 7" single (Lazy Records, LAZY04)

1. "Sunny Sundae Smile" – 2:30
2. "Paint a Rainbow" – 2:19

UK 12" single (Lazy Records, LAZY04T)

1. "Sunny Sundae Smile" – 2:30
2. "Paint a Rainbow" – 2:19
3. "Kiss the Eclipse" – 2:34
4. "Sylvie's Head" – 1:54

== Personnel ==
All personnel credits adapted from "Sunny Sundae Smile"'s liner notes.

My Bloody Valentine

- David Conway – vocals
- Kevin Shields – guitar, vocals
- Debbie Googe – bass
- Colm Ó Cíosóig – drums

Technical personnel

- My Bloody Valentine – production
- Steve Nunn – engineering
- Pete Peterson – photography

== Chart positions ==
Chart (1987)	Peak position
UK Independent Singles Chart	6

== Cover versions ==
The Primitives released an acoustic version of Kiss the Eclipse on YouTube
