= This Is Your Bloody Valentine =

EP by My Bloody Valentine
- Released: January 1985
- Recorded: December 1984
- Studio: SCS 8TK Studios in West Berlin, Germany
- Genre: Post-punk; gothic rock
- Length: 25:33
- Label: Tycoon
- Producer: My Bloody Valentine

My Bloody Valentine chronology
This Is Your Bloody Valentine (1985)	Man You Love to Hate – Live (1985)

Professional ratings
Review scores
Source	Rating
AllMusic	2/5 stars

This Is Your Bloody Valentine is the debut mini album by the Irish alternative rock band My Bloody Valentine, released in January 1985 on Tycoon Records. Recorded in West Berlin, Germany, it features the band's early gothic rock and post-punk sound, which contrasts the shoegaze sound with which My Bloody Valentine are associated.

The band secured a contract with Tycoon Records after sending a demo tape they had recorded in their hometown—Dublin, Ireland— to a label associate. The demo tape included five songs, "Girl on the 13th Floor", "Halfwalk", "Last Tango in Paradise", "The Garden of Delight" and "Don't Cramp My Style", the latter of which was re-recorded for the album. The demo was recorded in guitarist Kevin Shields' parents' home in Killiney, South Dublin. Shields and drummer Colm Ó Cíosóig later overdubbed bass and drum tracks at Litton Lane Studios.

Upon its release, the album made little impression and the band relocated to London, United Kingdom. Similarities between My Bloody Valentine and The Jesus and Mary Chain had been suggested in the music press but guitarist Kevin Shields later told Melody Maker "we've got a mini-LP we made in Berlin in '84, pre-Mary Chain [...] with all our traits there—feedback thrash." AllMusic reviewer Stephen Thomas Erlewine has referred to the album as "an unfocused and derivative collection of post-punk goth rock". This Is Your Bloody Valentine was reissued in 1990 by Dossier Records on LP and CD.

== Track listing ==
All tracks are written by Kevin Shields, David Conway and Colm Ó Cíosóig.

Side one
No.	Title	Length
1.	"Forever and Again"	3:32
2.	"Homelovin' Guy"	3:02
3.	"Don't Cramp My Style"	2:25
4.	"Tiger in My Tank"	3:30

Side two
No.	Title	Length
5.	"The Love Gang"	3:54
6.	"Inferno"	4:40
7.	"The Last Supper"	4:30
Total length:		25:33

== Personnel ==
All personnel credits adapted from This is Your Bloody Valentine's liner notes.

My Bloody Valentine

- David Conway – vocals
- Kevin Shields – guitar, bass guitar, backing vocals
- Tina Durkin – keyboards
- Colm Ó Cíosóig – drums (credited as Colm Cusack)

Technical personnel

- My Bloody Valentine – production
- Markus Bosak – engineering
