= M b v =

m b v

Studio album by My Bloody Valentine
- Released: 2 February 2013
- Recorded: 2006–2012
- Genres: Shoegaze; noise pop
- Length: 46:37
- Label: MBV
- Producer: Kevin Shields

My Bloody Valentine chronology
EP's 1988–1991 (2012)	m b v (2013)

m b v is the third studio album by Irish rock band My Bloody Valentine, self-released on 2 February 2013. Produced by the band's vocalist and guitarist Kevin Shields, m b v was the band's first full-length release of original material since Loveless (1991), over two decades earlier.

Recording for m b v began prior to My Bloody Valentine's breakup in 1997, but was shelved until 2006 when the band was reunited, with further recording occurring after 2011. The album received critical acclaim and was named among the best albums of 2013 by numerous publications.

== Recording ==
Following their departure from Creation Records after the release of their second studio album Loveless (1991), My Bloody Valentine signed with Island Records in October 1992 for a reported £250,000. The band's advance went towards the construction of a home studio in Streatham, South London, which was completed in April 1993. Several technical problems with the studio sent the band into "semi-meltdown", according to vocalist and guitarist Kevin Shields, who was rumoured to have been suffering from writer's block. Between 1993 and 1996, the band recorded and released two covers: "We Have All the Time in the World" by Louis Armstrong for Peace Together, and "Map Ref. 41°N 93°W" by Wire for the tribute album Whore: Tribute to Wire.

Rumours spread that several albums worth of material had been recorded and shelved prior to the band's 1997 breakup. In 1999, it was reported that Shields had delivered 60 hours of material to Island Records, and vocalist and guitarist Bilinda Butcher confirmed that there existed "probably enough songs to fill two albums". Shields confirmed that at least one full album of "half-finished" material was abandoned: "It was worth dumping. It was dead. It hadn't got that spirit, that life in it."

Recording sessions for m b v began in 1996, after bassist Debbie Googe and drummer Colm Ó Cíosóig had left the band. Shields began recording guitar riffs to tape, laying the foundations for several songs. He said that when the sessions concluded in 1997 the album was "half-finished". Shields recorded most of the instrumentation. In an interview with Drowned in Sound, Googe said that the drum parts had "been added then taken off at least once", with Shields' brother Jimi Shields recording beats for sampling and Ó Cíosóig recording final live tracks.

In 2006, Shields resumed recording at the time when the band was reunited, combining recordings from the 1996 and 1997 sessions with additional instrumentation. Final vocal, bass and drum tracks and overdubs were recorded in 2011 and 2012. "She Found Now" was the only song recorded "completely from scratch" in 2012.

The album was recorded and mixed on analogue equipment, as with My Bloody Valentine's earlier albums. It was recorded on 2-inch 24-track tape and mixed on half-inch tape. Mastering was completed on 21 December 2012, after four months of mixing and editing in late 2012. The post-production process involved no digital processing, according to the band. The band recorded additional material at Grouse Lodge in County Westmeath, Ireland during January 2013.

== Music ==
m b v's music has been described as shoegaze, and noise pop. In an interview with The Quietus prior to m b v's release, Shields said it was "not going to sound like Loveless where it's like looking into another world ... more like Isn't Anything, where it seems to be of this world, but with one foot in another world ... the songs on Loveless had more in common with folk-blues music to me, just a verse and an instrumental passage, circular" and described the new material as "more elongated" and "raw".

The Beach Boys' unfinished album Smile was an influence on the composition. According to Shields, he "wanted to see what would happen if I worked in a more impressionistic way, so that it only comes together at the end." He later expanded on his comments, stating that he was "purposefully not trying to write songs with a beginning, middle, and end." He mentioned drum and bass as an influence on one of the album's songs, and jungle music had influenced some of the original material recorded in 1996. Commenting on unreleased songs from m b v's recording sessions Shields said "there's probably about three more [songs] that will come out sometime."

In 2007, describing the apparent imminent release of a new record, Shields expressed his vision that "It sounds like what we sounded like—different but not radically different" and revealed that the album was composed based on "[the] '96/'97 record half-finished record finished [sic], and then a compilation of stuff we did before that in 1993–94, and a little bit of new stuff."

== Promotion and release ==
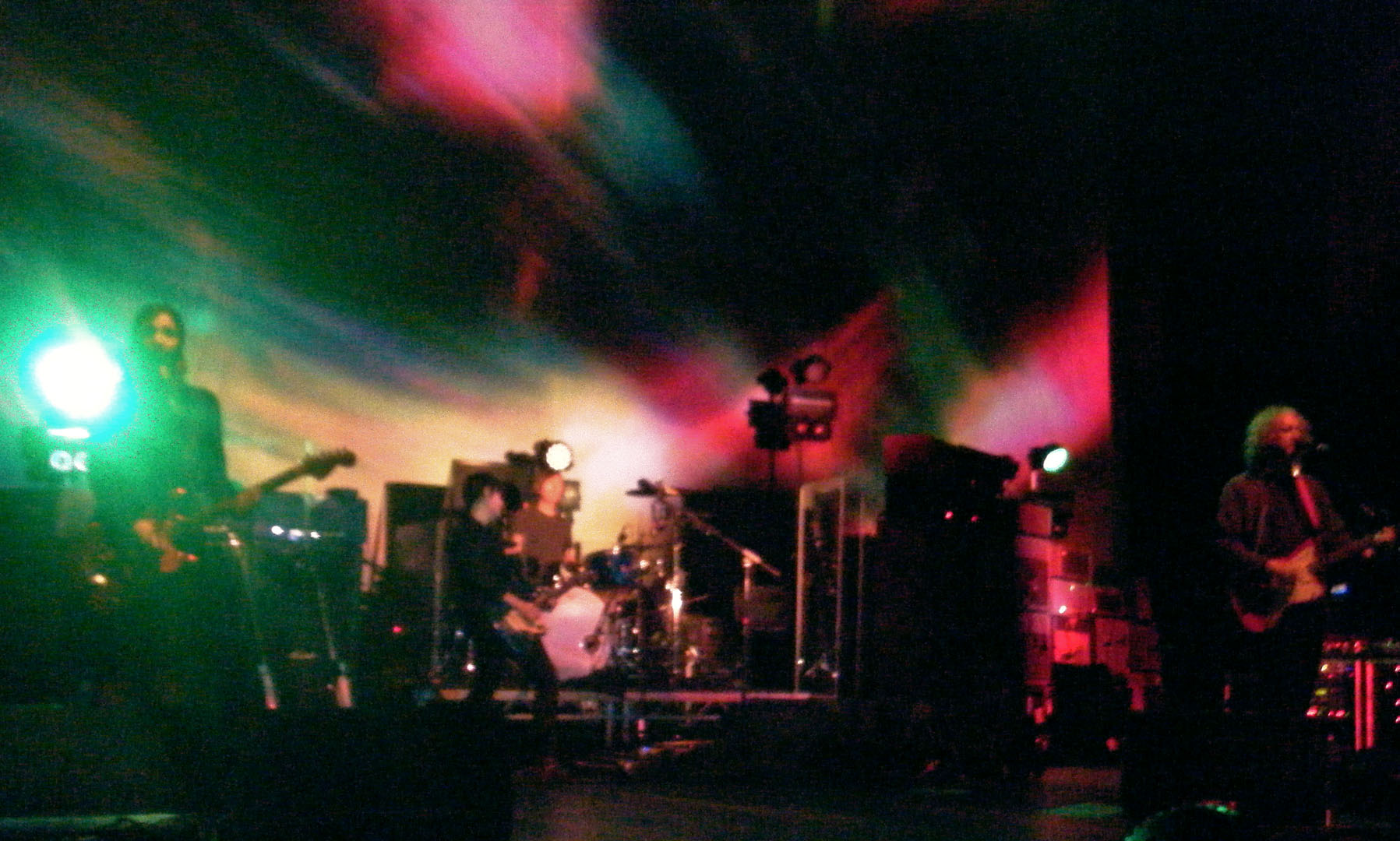
My Bloody Valentine performing at the O2 Apollo in Manchester, United Kingdom on 10 March 2013

Prior to m b v's release, My Bloody Valentine announced live dates in South Korea, Japan, Taiwan and Australia during February 2013. The tour began on 3 February in Seoul and concluded on 22 February in Melbourne. A three-date tour of the United Kingdom was later announced, with the band performing from 8 to 12 March at Barrowlands in Glasgow, O2 Apollo in Manchester and Hammersmith Apollo in London. Due to demand, a second performance at Hammersmith Apollo on 13 March was added. The band performed a warm-up show at Electric Brixton in London on 27 January 2013, performing a new song entitled "Rough Song", which was later titled "New You" on m b v. The band undertook North American and Japanese dates in summer and fall of 2013.

My Bloody Valentine confirmed m b v's release through the band's Facebook page on 2 February 2013. The band's website was relaunched at 11:58 GMT on 2 February, where m b v was released on mbv Records. It was made available for purchase on the website as a download (MP3 or WAV), a CD and download package, or a 180g LP, CD and download package. The website crashed within minutes of m b v's release, due to web traffic, and the album was later made available for stream on YouTube. Physical copies of the album were released on 22 February. Asked about the sales, Shields said: "If we [had] put it out on a major label, we would've had to sell 1.5 million copies to do as well as we will have done by the end of the year."

== Reception ==
Professional ratings
Aggregate scores
Source	Rating
AnyDecentMusic?	8.7/10
Metacritic	87/100
Review scores
Source	Rating
AllMusic	4/5 stars
The A.V. Club	A−
The Daily Telegraph	4/5 stars
The Guardian	5/5 stars
The Independent	4/5 stars
Los Angeles Times	3.5/4 stars
NME	8/10
Pitchfork	9.1/10
Rolling Stone	4/5 stars
Spin	8/10

m b v received universal acclaim. At Metacritic, which assigns a normalised rating out of 100 to reviews from mainstream critics, the album received an average score of 87, based on 46 reviews, indicating "universal acclaim". AllMusic rated m b v four out of five stars. Writing for The A.V. Club, Jason Heller said the album "stands as something potentially timeless—and immediately breathtaking". Heller drew comparisons between the first half of the album and Loveless, and stated that the latter half "relinquishes the familiar and swims far beyond the sight of shore", in his A− review. BBC Music reviewer Ian Wade gave m b v a favourable review, describing "the lack of a dramatic shift in direction" as "comforting". He referred to the album as "a perfect follow-up to Loveless and noted it "represents an astounding return". Greg Kot of the Chicago Tribune awarded the album two and a half stars out of four and described m b v as being in thirds, saying "the opening trio of songs offers a paler version of the revolutionary Loveless sound", "the album takes a turn in its middle third with 'Is This and Yes,' essentially a long palette cleanser devoid of guitars" and "the album's final three songs serve as the antidote".

Ludovic Hunter-Tilney of the Financial Times rated the album four out of five stars and said that m b v's opening track "leads us to expect a Loveless 2.0; as though Shields, pushing 50, has finally accepted that he has painted himself into a corner. However, as the album unfolds it transforms itself into a remarkable act of renewal", later concluding there was "a wild, undisciplined feel to the music". Writing for The Guardian, Alexis Petridis compared the album favourably to Loveless and stated that m b v was "more melodically complex, intriguing and often pleasing than anything My Bloody Valentine has written before" in his full five-star review.

Both Hot Press and The Irish Times published favourable reviews of m b v—Eamon Sweeney of Hot Press said My Bloody Valentine "have delivered nine tracks and 46 minutes of beautiful madness to luxuriate and get completely lost in" and Jim Carroll praised the album, referring to it as "damn good" and adding "but this is [My Bloody Valentine] and that third album comes with so many expectations that it's nigh on impossible for it to live up to what we expect." Los Angeles Times' music critic Randall Roberts awarded m b v three and a half stars out of four. He described the album as opening with "a syrupy, drunken vessel of deep tremolo guitar" and ending on "a whirlwind of rhythm", adding "the record blossoms 20 minutes in, and over its length presents the sound of a group living in the here and now: rhythms of the moment, and staticky love-anthems like 'If I Am' as beautiful as anything the band has ever done." Spin rated m b v eight out of ten, with reviewer Michael Robbins referring to it as a "logical next step" and "utterly contemporary" with "a few songs betray[ing] their long, frustrating gestation in a studio vacuum."

== Accolades ==
m b v was included in the 2014 revision of the book 1001 Albums You Must Hear Before You Die, although it was removed in later versions.

Accolades for m b v
Publication	Accolade	Rank
Cokemachineglow	Top 30 Albums of 2013	5
Consequence of Sound	Top 50 Albums of 2013	3
Exclaim!	Top 20 Pop & Rock Albums of 2013	3
Metacritic	25-Best Reviewed Albums of 2013	3
Metacritic	2013 Music Critic Top-Ten Lists	13
No Ripcord	Top 50 Albums of 2013	1
Pitchfork	Top 50 Albums of 2013	4
Pitchfork	Top 100 Albums 2010–2014	28
Stereogum	50 Best Albums of 2013	5
Uncut	Best Albums of 2013	1
The Village Voice	Pazz & Jop Critic's Poll	6
The Wire	Releases of the Year 1–50	21

== Track listing ==
All lyrics are written by Kevin Shields, except "New You", written by Shields and Bilinda Butcher; all music is composed by Shields.

m b v track listing
No.	Title	Lead vocals	Length
1.	"She Found Now"	Shields	5:06
2.	"Only Tomorrow"	Butcher	6:22
3.	"Who Sees You"	Shields	6:12
4.	"Is This and Yes"	Butcher	5:07
5.	"If I Am"	Butcher	3:54
6.	"New You"	Butcher	4:59
7.	"In Another Way"	Butcher	5:31
8.	"Nothing Is"	instrumental	3:34
9.	"Wonder 2"	Shields	5:52
Total length:			46:37

Notes

- On some releases, every song's title is stylized in all lowercase letters. For example, "Only Tomorrow" is stylized as "only tomorrow". Other releases use regular title case for the song titles.

== Personnel ==
Credits are adapted from the liner notes of m b v.

My Bloody Valentine

- Kevin Shields – vocals, guitar, sampler, production, mixing, artwork
- Bilinda Butcher – vocals, guitar
- Debbie Googe – bass, artwork
- Colm Ó Cíosóig – drums, sampler

Additional personnel

- Andy Savours – engineering
- Alex Wharton – digital mastering
- Noel Summerville – vinyl mastering
- Seán O'Reilly – layout, artwork
- Matthew Cooper – layout, artwork

== Charts ==
2013 chart performance for m b v
Chart (2013)	Peak position
Belgian Albums Chart (Flanders)	87
Belgian Albums Chart (Wallonia)	120

2021 chart performance for m b v
Chart (2021)	Peak position
Australian Albums (ARIA)	88
Irish Albums (Official Charts)	44
Japanese Albums (Oricon)	47
Portuguese Albums (AFP)	42
Scottish Albums (Official Charts)	9
Swedish Physical Albums (Sverigetopplistan)	6
UK Albums (Official Charts)	29
UK Independent Albums (Official Charts)	6
US Indie Store Album Sales (Billboard)	7
US Top Album Sales (Billboard)	55
