= The New Record by My Bloody Valentine =

EP by My Bloody Valentine
- Released: September 1986
- Recorded: August 1986
- Studio: Alaska Studios in London, United Kingdom
- Genre: Noise rock
- Length: 10:16
- Label: Kaleidoscope Sound
- Producer: My Bloody Valentine, Joe Foster

My Bloody Valentine chronology
Geek! (1985)	The New Record by My Bloody Valentine (1986)	Ecstasy (1987)

Professional ratings
Review scores
Source	Rating
Allmusic	3/5 stars

The New Record by My Bloody Valentine is the second EP by the Irish alternative rock band My Bloody Valentine, released in September 1986 on Kaleidoscope Sound. Recorded at Alaska Studios in London, the EP's sound is influenced by C86, a brand of indie pop, and diverges from the band's earlier post-punk sound.

Allmusic writer Nitsuh Abebe has called The New Record by My Bloody Valentine "a vital point in the development of [the band's] sound" and referred to it as "the point at which the band started to experiment with pop music and noise", influenced by The Jesus and Mary Chain. Upon its release, The New Record by My Bloody Valentine peaked at number 22 in the UK Independent Singles Chart.

== Track listing ==
All tracks are written by Kevin Shields and David Conway unless otherwise noted.

Side one
No.	Title	Writer(s)	Length
1.	"Lovelee Sweet Darlene"		2:13
2.	"By the Danger in Your Eyes"	Shields, Conway, Colm Ó Cíosóig	2:51

Side two
No.	Title	Length
3.	"On Another Rainy Saturday"	2:41
4.	"We're So Beautiful"	2:31
Total length:		10:16

== Personnel ==
All personnel credits adapted from The New Record by My Bloody Valentine's liner notes.

My Bloody Valentine

- David Conway – vocals
- Kevin Shields – guitar, vocals
- Debbie Googe – bass
- Colm Ó Cíosóig – drums

Technical personnel

- My Bloody Valentine – production
- Joe Foster – production
- Steve Nunn – engineering
- Pete Peterson – photography

== Chart positions ==
Chart (1986)	Peak position
UK Independent Singles Chart	22
