= You Made Me Realise (song) =

1988 single by My Bloody Valentine

Single by My Bloody Valentine

from the EP You Made Me Realise
- Released: 8 August 1988
- Genre: Shoegaze; noise rock
- Length: 3:46
- Label: Creation
- Songwriter: Kevin Shields
- Producer: My Bloody Valentine

My Bloody Valentine singles chronology
"Strawberry Wine" (1987)	"You Made Me Realise" (1988)	"Feed Me With Your Kiss" (1988)

"You Made Me Realise" is a song by Irish rock band My Bloody Valentine, released in August 1988 by Creation. The opening track and lead single from their EP of the same name (1988), "You Made Me Realise" is considered an essential work of the band.

== Recording and composition ==
"You Made Me Realise" was recorded by My Bloody Valentine for their EP of the same name in Walthamstow, East London. It was written by lead vocalist and guitarist Kevin Shields and produced by the band. It blends elements of shoegaze and noise rock. Its middle section of noise is often referred to as the "holocaust" section.

== Reception ==
"You Made Me Realise" peaked at number 107 on the UK singles chart and number five on the UK indie chart; both were their highest entries on either chart by that point. The song received positive reviews from critics, with AllMusic's Nitsuh Abede deeming it a standout of the EP. Alexis Petridis of The Guardian called it "a song that stopped listeners in their tracks: its furious, pummelling [sic] riff and stop-start structure at odds with the languorous, alluring vocals, the 40-second gust of beatless noise that splits it in two."

== Legacy ==
"You Made Me Realise" is an enduring work by My Bloody Valentine. The song is ranked by Stylus at number 24 on their "Top 50 Basslines of All Time" list, Q at number 35 on their "100 Greatest Guitar Tracks Ever" list, and NME at number 50 on their "50 Greatest Indie Anthems Ever" list. Petridis ranked it second in The Guardian's list of the band's 20 greatest songs.

"You Made Me Realise" is a staple of the band's live setlist, and is usually played as the last song. During performances, the band repeats a single chord from the song for as long as they feel bearable as it descends into a cacophony. It usually lasts around 15 minutes, although there are reports of shows where it went on for well over half an hour. For the 2008–09 reunion shows, it brought each show to over 130 dB. These performances were praised by Billy Corgan of the Smashing Pumpkins, who cites the band as an influence.

== Charts ==
Chart (1988)	Peak position
UK Singles (OCC)	107
UK Indie (OCC)	5
