= Strawberry Wine (My Bloody Valentine song) =

Single by My Bloody Valentine
- B-side: "Never Say Goodbye"/"Can I Touch You"
- Released: 9 November 1987
- Recorded: July 1987
- Genre: Alternative rock; twee pop
- Length: 2:33
- Label: Lazy
- Songwriter: Kevin Shields
- Producer: My Bloody Valentine

My Bloody Valentine singles chronology
"Sunny Sundae Smile" (1987)	"Strawberry Wine" (1987)	"You Made Me Realise" (1988)

"Strawberry Wine" is a song by the alternative rock band My Bloody Valentine. It was released as a non-album single on 9 November 1987 on Lazy Records. It was the band's second release for Lazy and the first to feature vocalist and guitarist Bilinda Butcher, who had joined the band in April 1987 following the departure of original vocalist David Conway.

"Strawberry Wine" was released as a 12-inch single in a limited pressing of 2,500 copies. The contents of the single were later combined with My Bloody Valentine's following release, the mini album Ecstasy (1987), and reissued on the compilation album Ecstasy and Wine (1989). The compilation album was released without the band's consent and due to an error, an alternate mix of "Strawberry Wine" was used.

Upon its release, "Strawberry Wine" received moderate critical acclaim and peaked at number 13 on the United Kingdom Independent Singles Chart. Critics, who compared and contrasted it to Ecstasy, referred to the single as "certainly the better of the two releases" and described the title track as "still sounding in parts like the old Valentines with a strong Mamas & Papas type vocal line". The single's B-sides were referred to as "throwaways, except for the curiously different guitar style being heard for the first time." In Loveless, a book from the 33⅓ series about the My Bloody Valentine album of the same name, Mike McGonial referred to "Strawberry Wine" as a "rarified, effete and poppy approach to Byrdsian rock".

== Track listing ==
All tracks are written by Kevin Shields unless otherwise noted.

UK 12-inch single (Lazy Records, LAZY07T)
No.	Title	Lyrics	Music	Length
1.	"Strawberry Wine"			2:33
2.	"Never Say Goodbye"	Shields, Googe	Shields, Ó Cíosóig	2:32
3.	"Can I Touch You"			3:15

== Personnel ==
All personnel credits adapted from "Strawberry Wine"'s liner notes.

My Bloody Valentine

- Kevin Shields – vocals, guitar
- Bilinda Butcher – vocals, guitar
- Debbie Googe – bass
- Colm Ó Cíosóig – drums

Technical personnel

- My Bloody Valentine – production
- Steve Nunn – engineering

== Chart positions ==
Chart (1987)	Peak position
UK Independent Singles Chart	13
