= My Bloody Valentine (band) =

Irish rock band

- Members of My Bloody Valentine. Clockwise, from top left: Kevin Shields, Bilinda Butcher, Colm Ó Cíosóig, Debbie Googe.

Background information
- Origin: Dublin, Ireland
- Genres: Shoegaze; noise pop; dream pop; experimental rock
- Works: Discography; songs
- Years active: 1983–1997; 2007–present
- Labels: Tycoon; Fever; Kaleidoscope Sound; Lazy; Creation; Sire; Warner Bros.; Island; MBV; Domino
- Spinoffs: Hope Sandoval & the Warm Inventions; Snowpony
- Spinoff of: The Complex
- Members: Kevin Shields; Colm Ó Cíosóig; Debbie Googe; Bilinda Butcher
- Past members: David Conway; See band members section for others
- Website: mybloodyvalentine.org
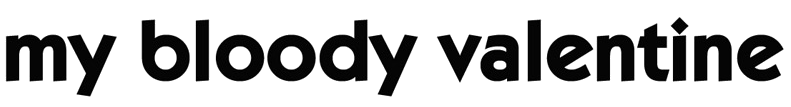

My Bloody Valentine (often abbreviated as MBV) (Note: Both My Bloody Valentine and MBV are stylised in all lowercase.) is an Irish rock band formed in Dublin, Ireland in 1983. Founded by singer and guitarist Kevin Shields and drummer Colm Ó Cíosóig, the band underwent multiple lineup changes before recruiting bassist Debbie Googe in 1985 and singer and guitarist Bilinda Butcher in 1987. Regarded as pioneers of the shoegaze subgenre, their work is characterised by distorted guitar textures, subdued androgynous vocals, and unorthodox production techniques.

Following several unsuccessful early releases and membership changes, My Bloody Valentine signed to Creation Records in 1988. The band released several successful extended plays (EPs) on the label, and the albums Isn't Anything (1988) and Loveless (1991). The latter is often regarded as the band's magnum opus and a landmark album in shoegaze, though the band were dropped by Creation after its release due to the album's extensive production costs.

In 1992, My Bloody Valentine signed to Island Records and recorded several albums' worth of unreleased material, remaining largely inactive. Googe and Ó Cíosóig left the band in 1995, and were followed by Butcher and Shields in 1997. They reunited in 2007 for a world tour and released a compilation album of EPs in 2012. Their third album, m b v (2013), received critical acclaim and was supported by further sporadic touring over the following years.

== History ==
=== Formation and early releases ===
In 1978, Kevin Shields and Colm Ó Cíosóig were introduced to each other at a karate tournament in South Dublin. The duo became friends in what has been described as "an almost overnight friendship" and later formed the Complex, a punk rock band, with Liam Ó Maonlaí, Ó Cíosóig's friend from Coláiste Eoin. The band, who performed "a handful of gigs" consisting of Sex Pistols and Ramones songs, disbanded when Ó Maonlaí left to form Hothouse Flowers. Shields and Ó Cíosóig later formed A Life in the Day, a post-punk trio, but failed to secure performances with more than a hundred people present.

Following A Life in the Day's dissolution, Shields and Ó Cíosóig formed My Bloody Valentine in early 1983 with bass player Mark Loughlin (now performing as the Engineer) and lead vocalist David Conway. Conway, who performed under the pseudonym Dave Stelfox, suggested a number of potential band names, including the Burning Peacocks, and performed a single gig under that name before the quartet changed the name to My Bloody Valentine. At the time, the band saw the trailer for My Bloody Valentine on a rented VHS movie during downtime of a rehearsal at the home of Shields's parents. Subsequently, Shields has claimed he was unaware that My Bloody Valentine was the title of a 1981 Canadian slasher film when the name was suggested. Second guitarist Stephen Ivers also joined the band at this time.

My Bloody Valentine experienced a number of lineup changes during their initial months. Lead guitarist Stephen Ivers and bassist Loughlin were recruited in April 1983, and the band would often rehearse near Smithfield and Temple Bar in rehearsal spaces owned by Alan Furlong. Walsh, who booked some of the band's early performances, said the rehearsals were "too noisy" and "crazy" that "next door were giving out hell". Loughlin left the band in December 1983 and was replaced by Paul Murtagh, who left the band in early 1984.

"The Last Supper"
From This Is Your Bloody Valentine (1985), "The Last Supper" features the band's original post-punk and gothic rock-inspired sound.

In March 1984, Shields, Ivers and Conway recorded the band's first demo on a four-track recorder in Shields's parents' home in Killiney. Shields and Ó Cíosóig overdubbed bass and drum tracks at Litton Lane Studios, and the tape was later used to secure a contract with Tycoon Records. Soon after recording the demo, Ivers left My Bloody Valentine, and Conway's girlfriend, Tina Durkin, joined as a keyboard player. Around this time, Conway, on the suggestion of Shields, contacted Gavin Friday, the lead vocalist of the post-punk band Virgin Prunes. According to Shields, Conway approached Friday in Finglas, asked him for advice, and was told to "get out of Dublin." Shields agreed with the advice, commenting in January 1991 that "there was no room for us" in Ireland; Ó Cíosóig explained that the Irish music scene was not receptive to their style. Friday provided the band with contacts that secured them a show in Tilburg, Netherlands. The band relocated to the Netherlands after the show and lived there for a further nine months, opening for R.E.M. on one occasion on 8 April 1984. Due to a lack of opportunities and a lack of correct documentation, the band relocated to West Berlin, Germany in late 1984 and recorded their debut mini album, This Is Your Bloody Valentine, released in 1985. The album failed to receive much attention, and the band returned temporarily to the Netherlands before settling in London that same year.

=== Recruitment of Googe and Butcher ===
Following their relocation to London in 1985, members of My Bloody Valentine lost contact with each other while looking for accommodation, and Tina Durkin, doubting her abilities as a keyboard player, left the band. When the remaining three members regained contact with one another, the band decided to audition bassists, as they lacked a regular bassist since their formation. Shields acquired Debbie Googe's telephone number from a contact in London, invited her to audition, and subsequently recruited her as a bassist. Googe managed to attend rehearsals, which were centered around her day job. Rehearsal sessions were regularly held at Salem Studios, which was connected to the independent record label Fever Records. The label's management was impressed with the band and agreed to release an extended play, provided the band would finance the recording sessions themselves. Released in December 1985, Geek! failed to reach the band's expectations; however, soon after its release, My Bloody Valentine were performing on the London gig circuit, alongside bands such as Eight Living Legs, Kill Ugly Pop and the Sting-rays.

Due to the band's slow progress, Shields contemplated relocating to New York City, where members of his family were living at the time. However, Creation Records co-founder Joe Foster had decided to establish his own record label, Kaleidoscope Sound, and persuaded My Bloody Valentine to record and release an EP. The New Record by My Bloody Valentine, produced by Foster, was released in October 1986 and was a minor success, peaking at number 22 on the UK Indie Chart upon its release. On the strength of the release, the band began performing more frequent shows, later developing a small following and travelling outside London for live performances, supporting and opening for bands such as the Membranes.

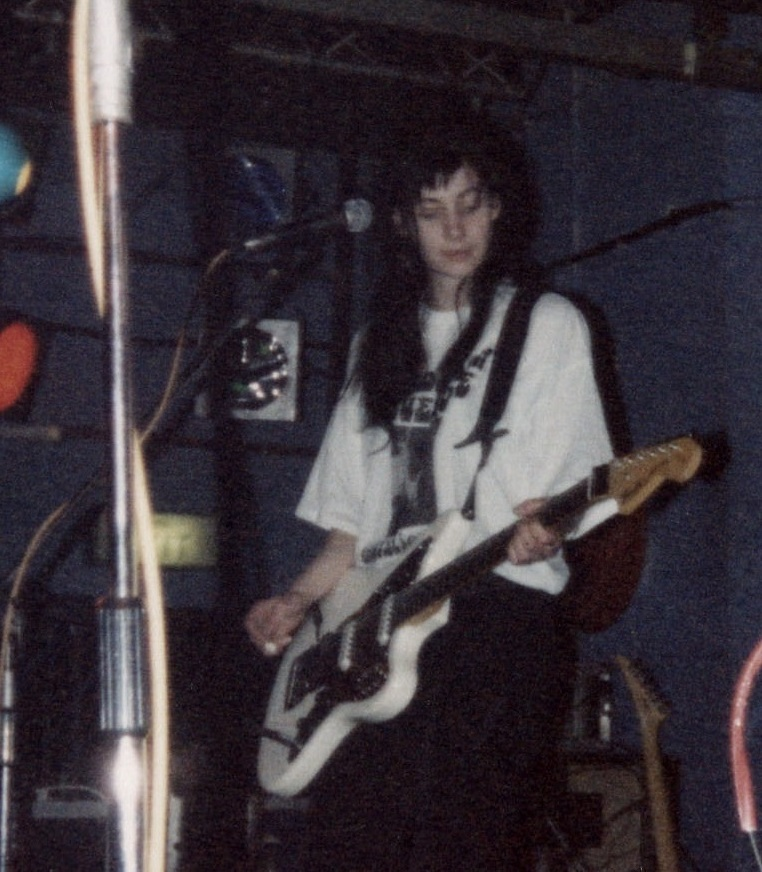
Bilinda Butcher performing in 1989

In early 1987, My Bloody Valentine signed to Lazy Records, another independent record label, which was founded by the indie pop band the Primitives and their manager, Wayne Morris. My Bloody Valentine's first release on the label was the single "Sunny Sundae Smile", released in February 1987. It peaked at number 6 on the UK Indie Singles Chart and the band toured following its release. After a number of performances throughout the U.K., the band managed to secure a support slot with the Soup Dragons, but on that tour in March 1987, David Conway announced his decision to leave the band, citing a gastric illness, disillusionment with music, and ambitions to become a writer.

Conway's departure left the band without a lead vocalist, and Shields, Ó Cíosóig and Googe advertised in the local music press for a new singer. The audition process, which Shields described as "disastrous and excruciating," was unsuccessful because he had mentioned the Smiths in the advertisements "because [he] liked their melodies," attracting a number of vocalists whom he called "fruitballs." Although considering forming another group, the band experimented with vocalists Bilinda Butcher and Joe Byfield, both of whom had been recommended to the band by other musicians. Butcher, whose musical experience consisted of playing classical guitar as a child and singing and playing tambourine "with some girlfriends for fun," had learned that My Bloody Valentine needed a backing vocalist from her partner, who had met Ó Cíosóig on a ferry from the Netherlands. At her audition, she sang Dolly Parton's 1975 song "The Bargain Store". She was invited to join the group, with Byfield deemed unsuitable as a lead vocalist.

Following Butcher's recruitment, Shields shared lead vocals with her. Commenting on the transition, Shields noted that Butcher "sounded all right and she could sing one of our songs, we just had to show her how to play guitar." Shields was initially reluctant to take on a vocal role within the band, but said that he had "always sung in the rehearsal room [...] and made up the melodies." With the new lineup in place, the band intended to drop the My Bloody Valentine moniker, but according to Ó Cíosóig and Shields, the band was unable to decide on a name and kept the moniker "for better or for worse."

=== Breakthrough with Isn't Anything and Loveless ===
"Clair"
From Ecstasy (1987), "Clair" was one of the first recordings to feature vocalist and guitarist Bilinda Butcher.

Under pressure from Lazy Records to release a full-length album, the band compromised and agreed to release a single and subsequent mini-album, citing the need for time to stabilise their new lineup. "Strawberry Wine", a three-track single, was released in November 1987, and Ecstasy was released a month later. Both received moderate critical acclaim and peaked at number 13 and 12 on the independent singles and albums chart, respectively. However, "Strawberry Wine" was described as "certainly the better of the two releases", as Ecstasy was plagued by production difficulties, including errors in the mastering process. Ecstasy was criticised as the product of "a group who appeared to have run out of money halfway through recording," which was later confirmed, as the band were funding the studio sessions themselves. My Bloody Valentine's contract with Lazy stated that the label would handle promotion of releases, whereas the band would finance the recording sessions. Following their departure from Lazy, which later rereleased "Strawberry Wine" and Ecstasy on the compilation album Ecstasy and Wine (1989) without the band's consent, Rough Trade Records offered a deal to finance the recording and release of a full-length album, but the band turned it down.

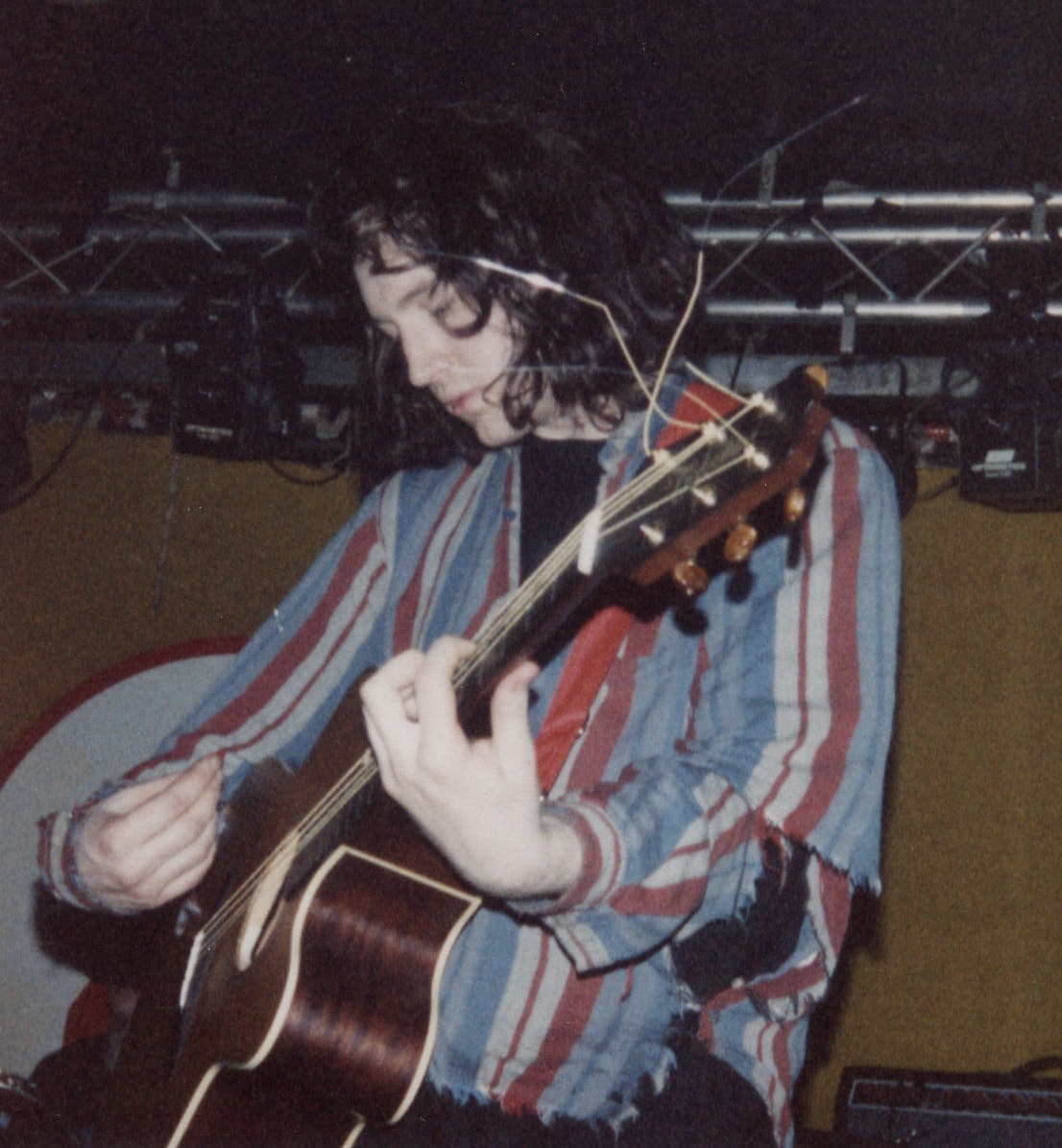
Kevin Shields performing in 1989

In January 1988, My Bloody Valentine performed in Canterbury, opening for Biff Bang Pow!, a band that featured Creation Records founder Alan McGee. After "blowing [Biff Bang Pow!] off the stage," My Bloody Valentine were described as "the Irish equivalent to Hüsker Dü" by McGee, who approached the band after the show and invited them to record and release a single on Creation. The band recorded five songs at a studio in Walthamstow, East London in less than a week. In August 1988, they released the You Made Me Realise EP, which was received well by the independent music press and, according to AllMusic's Nitsuh Abebe, "made critics stand up and take notice of the brilliant things My Bloody Valentine were up to ... it developed some of the stunning guitar sounds that would become the band's trademark." It debuted at number 2 on the UK Indie Chart.

Following the success of You Made Me Realise, the band released their debut full-length studio album, Isn't Anything, in November 1988. Recorded in rural Wales, the album was a major success, receiving widespread critical acclaim, peaking at number 1 on the UK Indie Chart and influencing a number of "shoegaze" bands, who according to AllMusic, "worked off the template My Bloody Valentine established with [the album]."

In February 1989, My Bloody Valentine began recording their second studio album at Blackwing Studios in Southwark, London. Creation Records believed that the album could be recorded "in five days," but it soon "became clear that wasn't going to happen." Following several unproductive months, during which Shields assumed main duties for the musical and technical aspects of the sessions, the band relocated to a total of 19 other studios and hired a number of engineers, including Alan Moulder, Anjali Dutt and Guy Fixsen. Because of the extensive recording time, Shields and Alan McGee agreed to release another EP, and the band released Glider in April 1990. Containing the lead single "Soon", the EP peaked at number 2 on the UK Indie Chart and the band toured in the summer of 1990 to support its release. In February 1991, while still recording their second album, My Bloody Valentine released Tremolo, which was another critical success and topped the UK Indie Chart.

"Soon"
From Glider (1990) and Loveless (1991), "Soon" features a dance-oriented beat behind three tracks of guitarist Kevin Shields' "glide guitar" playing.

Released in November 1991, Loveless was rumoured to have cost more than £250,000 and bankrupted Creation Records, claims that Shields has denied. Critical reception to Loveless was nearly unanimous with praise, although the album was not a commercial success; it peaked at number 24 on the UK Albums Chart but failed to chart internationally. McGee dropped My Bloody Valentine from Creation Records soon after the release of Loveless because of the album's extensive recording period and his interpersonal problems with Shields. However, Loveless proved to have a lasting influence, inspiring bands such as Radiohead, Smashing Pumpkins, Mogwai, Nine Inch Nails and more. It also retrospectively won the Mojo Award for Classic Album in 2008.

=== Unrealised deal and breakup ===
My Bloody Valentine signed with Island Records in October 1992 for a reported £250,000 contract. The band's advance went toward the construction of a home studio in Streatham, South London, which was completed in April 1993. Several technical problems with the studio sent the band into a "semi-meltdown," according to Shields, who was rumoured to be suffering from writer's block. The band remained largely inactive, but they recorded and released two cover songs, in 1993 and 1996—a rendering of "We Have All the Time in the World" by Louis Armstrong for Peace Together and a cover of "Map Ref. 41°N 93°W" by Wire for the tribute album Whore: Tribute to Wire.

In 1995, Debbie Googe and Colm Ó Cíosóig left My Bloody Valentine. Googe, who briefly worked as a taxi driver following her departure, formed the indie rock supergroup Snowpony with Katharine Gifford, who also performed with Stereolab and Moonshake. Ó Cíosóig relocated to the United States, forming Hope Sandoval & the Warm Inventions with Hope Sandoval of Mazzy Star. Shields and Butcher attempted to record a third studio album that Shields claimed would be released in 1998. However, unable to finalise a third album, Shields isolated himself and, in his own words, "went crazy," drawing comparisons in the music press to the eccentric behavior of Brian Wilson of the Beach Boys and Syd Barrett of Pink Floyd. Shields later became a touring member of Primal Scream, collaborated with a number of artists including Yo La Tengo, Dinosaur Jr. and Le Volume Courbe and recorded songs for the soundtrack to the 2003 film Lost in Translation.

Rumours have spread among fans that an album's worth of material had been recorded and shelved prior to the band's breakup. In 1999, it was reported that Shields had delivered 60 hours of material to Island Records, and Butcher confirmed that there existed "probably enough songs to fill two albums." Shields later admitted that at least one full album of "half-finished" material was abandoned, stating, "it was dead. It hadn't got that spirit, that life in it."

=== Reunion and world tour ===
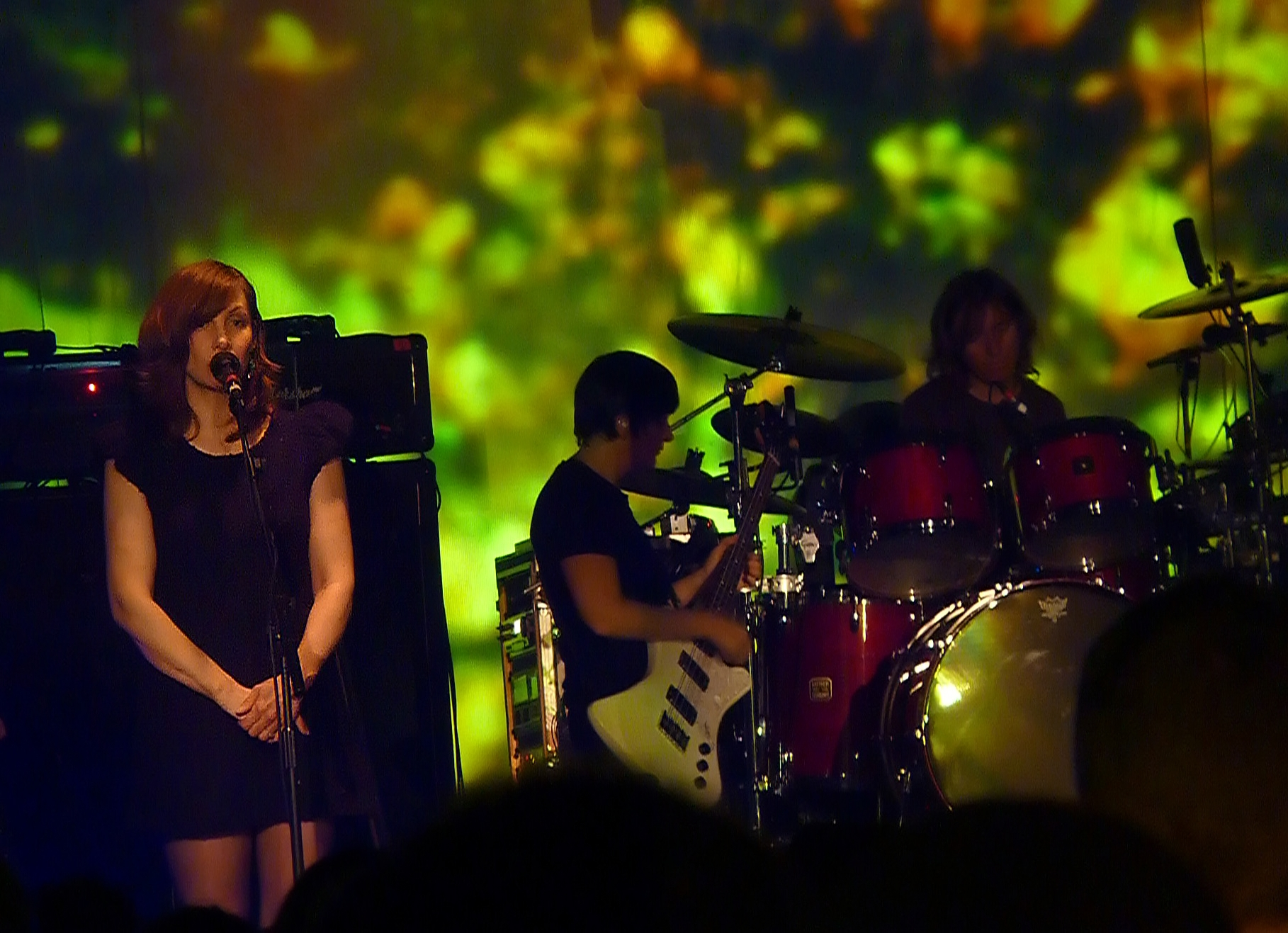
My Bloody Valentine performing in 2009

In August 2007, reports emerged suggesting that My Bloody Valentine would reunite for the 2008 Coachella Valley Music and Arts Festival in Indio, California. Similar reports had circulated in 2003 stating that Shields, Butcher and Ó Cíosóig were together in Berlin to rerecord five songs originally recorded for Glider that would be included in an upcoming box set. In 2007, reports suggested that the band were to perform at a series of Pod-organised concerts at the Irish Museum of Modern Art in Kilmainham, Dublin. Shields later confirmed the reunion and said that the band's third studio album, which he had begun recording in 1996, was near completion. Three live shows in the U.K. were announced in November 2007, and on 13 June 2008, My Bloody Valentine performed in public for the first time in 16 years with two live rehearsals at the Institute of Contemporary Arts in London.

My Bloody Valentine embarked upon an extensive worldwide tour throughout the summer and autumn of 2008. The band performed at European music festivals, including the Roskilde Festival in Roskilde, Denmark, Øyafestivalen in Oslo, Norway and Electric Picnic in Stradbally, Ireland, as well as the Fuji Rock Festival in Niigata, Japan. From 19 to 21 September, the band curated and performed at the 2008 All Tomorrow's Parties festival in New York and later performed throughout North America, including dates in Chicago, Toronto, Denver, San Francisco, Los Angeles and Austin. The band spent £200,000 on equipment for their world tour, which was their first since 1992 in support of Loveless.

Following additional touring in 2009, My Bloody Valentine dedicated their time to completing their third album. Rumours of a box set, which had circulated in April 2008 following a listing on HMV Japan's web site, recirculated. In March 2012, after a number of reported delays, Sony Music Ireland announced the release of the compilation album EP's 1988–1991—a collection of the band's Creation Records extended plays, singles and unreleased tracks. The compilation album was released on 4 May 2012 along with remastered versions of Isn't Anything and Loveless.

=== m b v and beyond ===
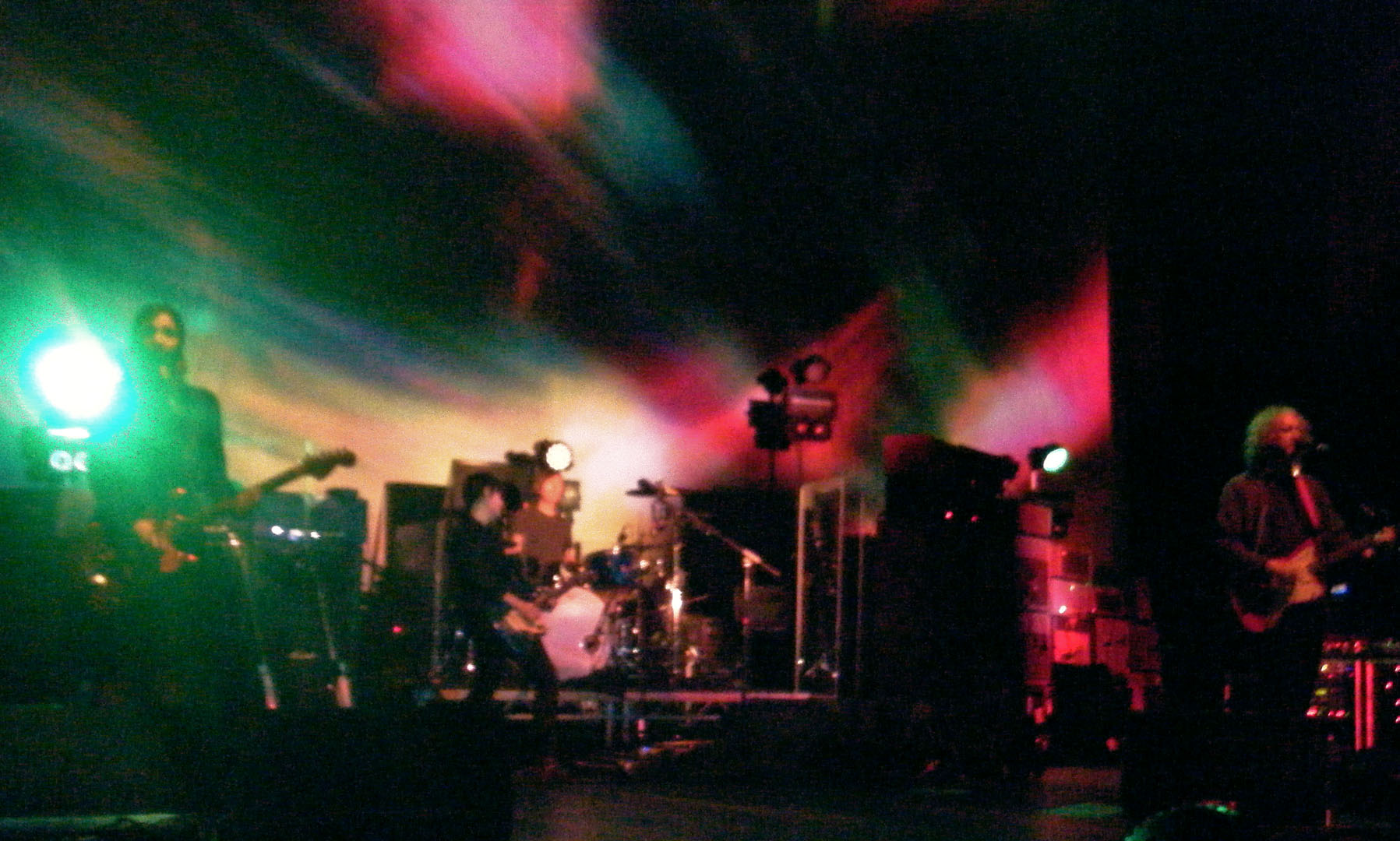
My Bloody Valentine performing in Manchester, 2013

In November 2012, Kevin Shields announced plans to release My Bloody Valentine's third album online before the end of the year. In December, the band announced on Facebook that the album was completed and mastered, and on 27 January 2013, during a warmup show at Electric Brixton in London, Shields told the audience that the album "might be out in two or three days." The album, titled m b v, was released through the band's official website on 2 February 2013, and the resulting high traffic crashed the site. Upon its release, m b v received "universal acclaim," according to Metacritic, and the band went on a worldwide tour.

In 2013, Shields announced plans to release a My Bloody Valentine EP "of all-new material," which would be followed by a fourth studio album. He was reported in 2017 to be working on material for a new My Bloody Valentine album, projected for release in 2018. As of 2018, two EPs were expected to be released in 2019, but all previously announced release estimates have not been met.

On 29 March 2021, My Bloody Valentine published a promotional video which features the cover art of previous releases and the text "31 03". On 31 March 2021, it was announced that My Bloody Valentine signed with Domino Recording Company. The band's full discography from 1988 to 2013 was made available on streaming services worldwide for the first time, and CD and LP re-releases were announced for 21 May. While promoting My Bloody Valentine's re-releases, Shields confirmed that the band is working on new material, and said that they plan on finishing a melodic, song-oriented album and a more experimental album.

After a seven-year hiatus, My Bloody Valentine reformed for a worldwide tour beginning in November 2025. That same month, the band removed most of their work from streaming services in Israel as part of the No Music for Genocide boycott.

== Artistry ==
=== Equipment and sound ===
"In Another Way"
From m b v (2013), "In Another Way" blends Shields' guitar techniques with elements of drum and bass music from the mid-1990s.

Shields' electric guitar sound is one of the most recognisable aspects of My Bloody Valentine's music, which "use[s] texture more than technique to create vivid soundscapes." During the late 1980s, Shields customised the tremolo systems for his Fender Jaguars and Jazzmasters; extending the tremolo arm and using it to pitch bend, which subsequently became a signature element of the band's sound. Shields used several alternate and open tunings that together with his tremolo manipulation achieved "a strange warping effect that makes the music wander in and out of focus", according to Rolling Stone. Shields' most notable effect is reverse digital reverb, sourced from an Alesis Midiverb II or Yamaha SPX90 effects unit. Together with the tremolo manipulation and distortion, he created a technique known as "glide guitar".

Shields effects rig, which is mainly composed of distortion, graphic equalisers and tone controls, consists of at least 30 effects pedals and is connected to a large number of amplifiers, which are often set to maximum volume to increase sustain. During live performances, in the closing song "You Made Me Realise", My Bloody Valentine perform an interlude of noise, which can last for half an hour and often reaches 130 dB. Shields later remarked "it was so loud it was like sensory deprivation. We just liked the fact that we could see a change in the audience at a certain point."

Bilinda Butcher's vocals have been referred to as "an intrinsic part" of My Bloody Valentine's sound, alongside Shields' guitar techniques. On a number of occasions during the recording of Isn't Anything and Loveless, Butcher was awoken and recorded vocals, which she said "influenced [her] sound" by making them "more dreamy and sleepy". The vocals in most My Bloody Valentine's recordings are low in the mix as Shields intended for the vocals to be used as an instrument. Critics have often described the band's vocals as androgynous.

=== Influences and style ===
My Bloody Valentine's music has been described as shoegaze, noise pop, dream pop, and experimental rock with influences from alternative rock and post-punk. The band was originally influenced by post-punk acts such as the Birthday Party, the Cramps and Joy Division; according to author Mike McGonigal, the band "brought together the least interesting elements" of their influences. They were also influenced by certain dark post-punk bands who were experimenting: "the best of all was Siouxsie and the Banshees, the Cure and Killing Joke". Their debut mini album, This Is Your Bloody Valentine (1985), incorporated a gothic rock sound that AllMusic refer to as "unfocused and derivative". However, when the band began experimenting with pop melodies on The New Record by My Bloody Valentine (1986), it marked "a vital point in the development of their sound", which was influenced primarily by the Jesus and Mary Chain. The band later took a "rarified, effete and poppy approach to Byrdsian rock" with their two successive releases, "Strawberry Wine" and Ecstasy (1987). Isn't Anything and its preceding releases were influenced by American bands, most notably the distorted guitar-based noise rock of Dinosaur Jr. and Sonic Youth, as well as the experimental dream pop of British group A.R. Kane, during which time Shields developed his trademark guitar techniques.

The band were further influenced by dance music and especially hip-hop, of which Shields said "it beats the shit out of most rock music when it comes to being experimental, it's been a constant source of inspiration to us." Shield's experimentation with guitar tone would be influenced by sampled sounds employed by Public Enemy and the Bomb Squad, which Shields described as "half-buried or muted, a real sense of sounds being semi-decayed, or destroyed, but then re-used." The band experimented with samplers around the time of the Glider EP, utilizing them to play back and manipulate their own guitar feedback and vocals on keyboards; by the time of the Tremolo EP, they had acquired an Akai sampler. In the mid-1990s, Kevin Shields and Colm Ó Cíosóig recorded music influenced by the rapid rhythms of the UK's underground jungle and drum and bass scenes.

=== Lyrics ===
A majority of My Bloody Valentine's lyrics are written by Shields, while Butcher wrote a third of the lyrics on both Isn't Anything and Loveless. Spin writer Simon Reynolds has noted that the band's lyrics often contain sexual themes, which are "a paradoxical blend of force and tenderness". Butcher herself has referred to a lot of the lyrics as "plain nonsense." According to Butcher, she "didn't have a plan and never thought about lyrics until it was time to write them. I just used whatever was in my head for the moment." Some of her lyrics were written as a result of attempting to interpret rough versions of songs Shields had recorded. Butcher has said: "He [Shields] never sang any words on the cassettes I got but I tried to make his sounds into words." Butcher and Shields would often spend eight to ten hours a night writing lyrics, even though few changes actually resulted. Of this, Shields spoke:

Words are extremely important in the sense that we've spent way more time on the lyrics than ever on the music. Music is spontaneous and it's either good or bad so you just take it or leave it. Where lyrics, all the stuff comes out and then we usually just finish them right before we have to sing so it's usually these nights of eight or ten hours just trying to desperately make sure it's going to be as good as possible, even though most of it's there anyway and it's always been there. There's nothing worse than bad lyrics. For me a bad lyric is a lyric that jumps out at you, and that's offensive, it takes you completely away from enjoying the music.

== Legacy ==
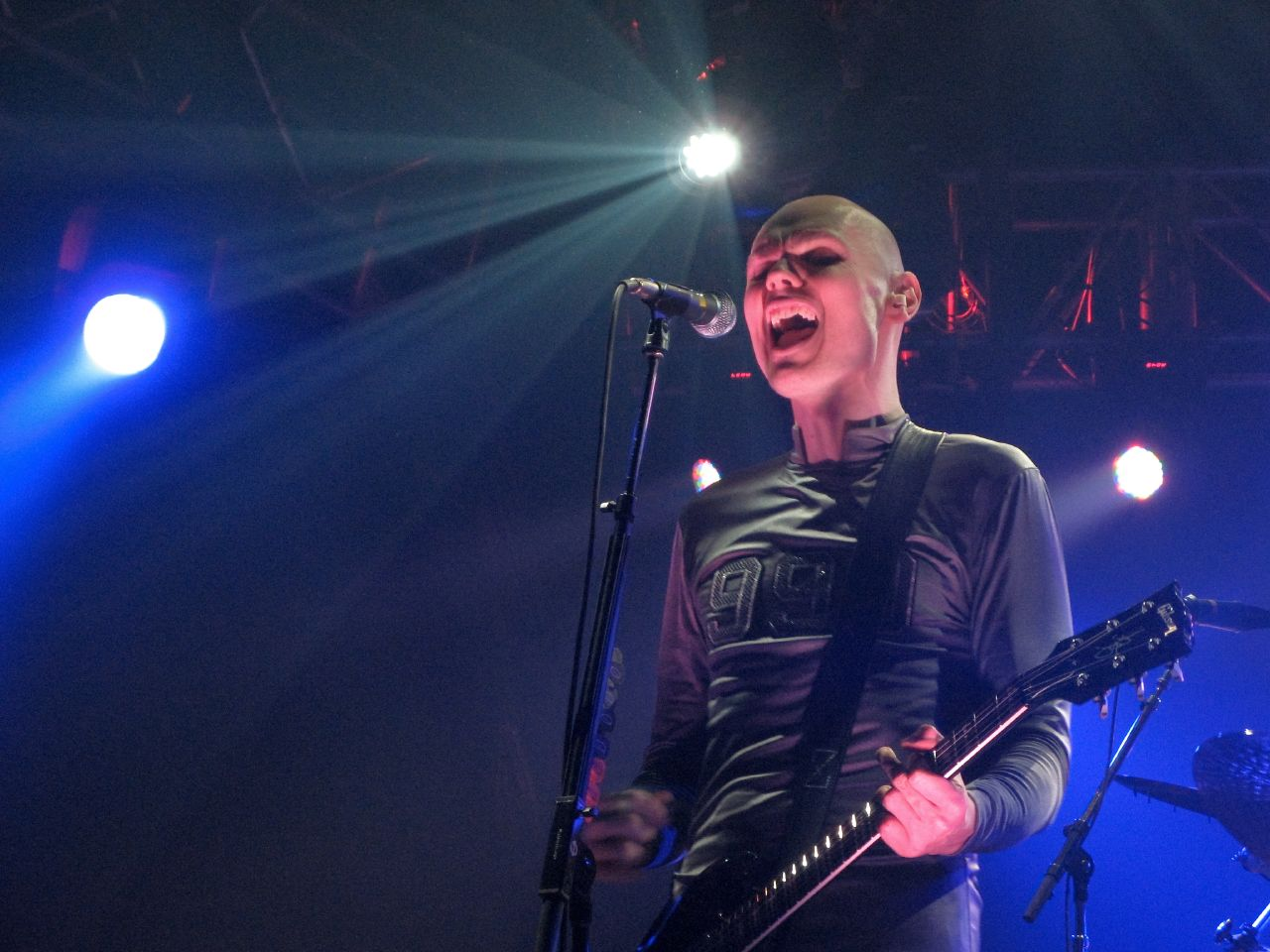
My Bloody Valentine have inspired musicians such as Billy Corgan of the Smashing Pumpkins

My Bloody Valentine are regarded by some as the pioneers of the alternative rock subgenre known as shoegaze, a term coined by Sounds journalists in the 1990s to describe certain bands' "motionless performing style, where they stood on stage and stared at the floor". The band's releases on Creation Records influenced shoegaze acts, including Slowdive, Ride and Lush, and are regarded as providing a platform to allow the bands to become recognised. Following the release of Loveless (1991), My Bloody Valentine were "poised for a popular breakthrough", although never achieved mainstream success. However, the band are noted to have been "profoundly influential in the direction of '90s alternative rock", according to AllMusic. In 2017, a study of AllMusic's database indicated My Bloody Valentine as its 26th most frequently cited influence on other artists.

Several alternative rock bands have cited My Bloody Valentine as an influence. The Smashing Pumpkins frontman Billy Corgan was influenced by Isn't Anything upon its release and attempted to recreate its sound on the band's debut album Gish (1991), particularly the closing track "Daydream" which Corgan described as "a complete rip-off of the My Bloody Valentine sound." The Smashing Pumpkins' two successive studio albums, Siamese Dream (1993) and Mellon Collie and the Infinite Sadness (1995), were also influenced by the band. Courtney Love cited the band as an influence on Hole's third album Celebrity Skin (1998).

Among the bands and artists that have cited My Bloody Valentine as an influence include Deftones, American Football, Mogwai, Oneohtrix Point Never, Brand New, Thursday, the Notwist, Naked Giants, Quicksand, ...And You Will Know Us by the Trail of Dead, Tame Impala, and Boards of Canada. Actor Michael Imperioli of The Sopranos fame has cited My Bloody Valentine as one of his favorite bands, and described seeing them live as "a very profound experience, very physical and very visceral".

== Members ==
Current members

- Kevin Shields – guitars, vocals, bass, sampler (1983–1997, 2007–present)
- Colm Ó Cíosóig – drums, sampler (1983–1995, 2007–present)
- Debbie Googe – bass (1985–1995, 2007–present)
- Bilinda Butcher – vocals, guitars (1987–1997, 2007–present)

Touring musicians

- Jen Macro – keyboards, guitars (2013–present)

Early members

- David Conway – vocals (1983–1987)
- Mark Loughlin – bass (1983)
- Stephen Ivers – guitar (1983–1984)
- Paul Murtagh – bass (1983–1984)
- Tina Durkin – keyboards (1984–1985)

Former touring musicians

- Anna Quimby – flute (1991–1992)

== Discography ==
Studio albums

- Isn't Anything (1988)
- Loveless (1991)
- m b v (2013)
