= Noise pop =

Subgenre of alternative and indie rock

- Other names: Noisy pop
- Stylistic origins: Alternative rock; indie rock; noise rock; pop
- Cultural origins: Mid-1980s, United Kingdom
- Derivative forms: Shoegaze

Other topics
- Alternative pop; avant-pop; dream pop; experimental pop; hyperpop; indie pop; art pop; noise music; no wave; progressive pop

Noise pop is a subgenre of alternative and indie rock that emerged in the mid-1980s in the United Kingdom, originally pioneered by the Jesus and Mary Chain on their debut album Psychocandy. Noise pop later influenced the development of shoegaze.

== Characteristics ==
Noise pop is characterized by a mixture of dissonant, abrasive noise and guitar feedback combined with pop-oriented songwriting. AllMusic describes the style as occupying "the halfway point between bubblegum and the avant-garde". Accordingly, noise pop "often has a hazy, narcotic feel, as melodies drift through the swirling guitar textures. But it can also be bright and lively, or angular and challenging."

== History ==
AllMusic cites the Velvet Underground as the earliest roots of the genre, with their experiments with feedback and distortion on their early albums. Early American alternative rock bands such as Sonic Youth, Yo La Tengo, Hüsker Dü, Dinosaur Jr., and the Replacements, mixed pop song structures with extreme guitar distortion and feedback.

Scottish band the Jesus and Mary Chain's 1985 debut, Psychocandy, is considered to be the earliest archetype for the noise pop genre, the band drew influence from the Velvet Underground, with their releases inspiring later prominent noise pop acts such as Meat Whiplash and The Flaming Lips. Kareem Estefan of Stylus Magazine cited the album for "transforming the use of distortion in indie rock with its screeching abrasion, yet managing to feature some of the catchiest melodies of the 80s."

== Legacy ==
Later in the 1980s, noise pop was a major inspiration for the British shoegazing movement. Influenced by The Jesus and Mary Chain, My Bloody Valentine started to experiment with a fusion of 1960s pop music and noise on their EP, The New Record by My Bloody Valentine, paving way to their forthcoming shoegazing sound. Noise pop continued to be influential in the indie rock scene into the 1990s.

Jenn Pelly, writing for Pitchfork on the legacy of Vivian Girls, refers to the band belonging to a "bicoastal late-aughts noise pop scene". She also refers to, in a separate article from around the same time, a "2008 noise-pop boom" containing bands such as Dum Dum Girls, Crystal Stilts, and The Pains of Being Pure at Heart.

== See also ==
- Noise Pop Festival
