= David Conway (author) =

Irish author and alternative rock musician

- Born: 1963 (age 62–63); Dublin, Ireland
- Occupations: Author; Musician (former)
- Writing career
- Period: 1983–1987 (as a musician); 1991–present (as an author)
- Genres: Horror fiction, science fiction
- Notable works: Metal Sushi; Tokyo Gothic; Celebrity Bedlam
- Website: www.radicalrobotbooks.com

David Conway (born 1963) is an Irish author and former musician. He was the original vocalist of the alternative rock band My Bloody Valentine, which he formed in 1983 with guitarist Kevin Shields and drummer Colm Ó Cíosóig. In 1987, during their minor underground success, Conway left the band and was replaced by Bilinda Butcher.

Since 1991, Conway has written four novels, including 2009's Tokyo Gothic and 2010's Celebrity Bedlam, published numerous short stories and contributed his writing to a selection of comic books. His writings are published by Radical Robot Books—his own publishing company—and Double Dragon Publishing. Conway lives in London.

== Early life ==
David Conway was born in Dublin, Ireland in 1963. He was raised in both Ireland and the United Kingdom and attended Irish Catholic schools, including Christian Brothers and Jesuit institutions. Conway dropped out of school and spent a number of years working in Dublin.

== Career ==
=== Music career: 1983–1987 ===
In 1983, Conway formed My Bloody Valentine with Kevin Shields and Colm Ó Cíosóig. He performed vocals, originally under the pseudonym Dave Stelfox, and suggested the name of the band, which was taken from the 1981 Canadian slasher film of the same name. Shields later claimed he was unaware of the film when Conway suggested the name, which was chosen ahead of other potential band names including The Burning Peacocks.

My Bloody Valentine experienced a number of line-up changes in their initial months and in 1984, Conway's girlfriend Tina Durkin was recruited as a keyboard player. On the suggestion of Shields, Conway contacted Gavin Friday, lead vocalist of the post-punk band Virgin Prunes, for advice on succeeding on the Dublin music scene and was given a list of contacts to secure the band shows in Tilburg, Netherlands. The band emigrated to the Netherlands in early 1984 but due to a lack of correct documentation, they had to relocate again to West Germany, where they released their debut mini album, This is Your Bloody Valentine, in January 1985. The album failed to receive much attention and the band returned temporarily to the Netherlands, before settling in London, United Kingdom in the middle of 1985.

Conway was featured on the band's debut extended play (EP) Geek! (1985) and the follow-up EP The New Record by My Bloody Valentine (1986). The New Record by My Bloody Valentine was the band's first minor success, peaking at number 22 on the UK Independent Albums Chart upon its release. His final recording with My Bloody Valentine was the 1987 single "Sunny Sundae Smile", which peaked at number 6 on the UK Independent Singles Chart and secured the band a support slot with The Soup Dragons. In March 1987, after the final date of the tour, Conway announced his decision to leave the band, due to a gastric illness, disillusionment with music and ambitions to become a writer. He was replaced by Bilinda Butcher.

=== Writing career: 1991–present ===
During his time working various jobs in the late 1980s, Conway began writing. His short horror fiction stories appeared in various Creation Books anthologies, including Eloise featured in 1991's Red Stains and Black Static featured in 1994's The Starry Wisdom: A Tribute to HP Lovecraft. In 1998, Metal Sushi, a collection of his short science fiction stories, was published by Oneiros Books. Critical reception to Metal Sushi was positive and author Grant Morrison referred to Conway as "the most powerful and distinctive writer of horror fiction since Clive Barker."

In addition to his short stories, Conway contributed his writing to a number of comic books, including Vampirella for Harris Comics, Vampi for Anarchy Studio and X-Men Unlimited for Marvel Comics. In 2009, he self-published his debut novel, Tokyo Gothic, on his own publishing company Radical Robot Books and Double Dragon Publishing. He has since published further three novels: Death Disco, Kinky Kabuki and Celebrity Bedlam.

== Bibliography ==
- Metal Sushi (1998)
- Tokyo Gothic (2009)
- Death Disco (2009)
- Kinky Kabuki (2010)
- Celebrity Bedlam (2010)
