= Colm Ó Cíosóig =

Irish musician (born 1964)

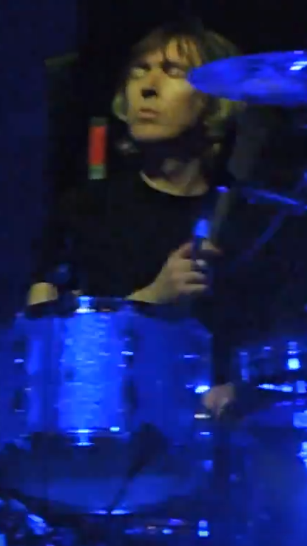
- Ó Cíosóig performing with My Bloody Valentine in 2013

Background information
- Born: 31 October 1964 (age 61); Dublin, Ireland
- Genres: Alternative rock; post-punk; shoegaze
- Occupations: Musician, songwriter
- Instruments: Drums; sampler; guitar; bass
- Years active: 1983–present
- Member of: My Bloody Valentine; Hope Sandoval & the Warm Inventions; Mazzy Star
- Formerly of: The Complex

Colm Ó Cíosóig (COL-lum oh-KEE-so-ig (Note: The Irish Gaelic pronunciation would be "oh-KYEE-so-ig".); Irish pronunciation: [ˈkɔlˠəmˠ oː ˈciːsˠoːɟ]; born 31 October 1964) is an Irish musician who achieved international fame as the drummer for the alternative rock band My Bloody Valentine. Their albums Isn't Anything (1988) and Loveless (1991) established Ó Cíosóig as a pioneering figure in the shoegaze genre.

== Career ==
=== My Bloody Valentine ===
Originally formed in 1983, My Bloody Valentine had gone through a few lineup changes before they forged a signature sound that was to become known by the music press as "shoegazing" in the late 80s and early 90s.

Along with Kevin Shields' guitar work and Bilinda Butcher's ethereal vocals, Ó Cíosóig's energetic and snare-heavy drumming had become a key element of the band's sound. He has co-written songs for My Bloody Valentine and has contributed production work to many of their releases.

During the recording of Loveless (1991), Ó Cíosóig suffered from physical ailments that limited his drumming ability. As a result, he played what drum patterns he was able to perform, and the results were sampled and re-arranged for the album. He played live drums for "Only Shallow", and "Come In Alone". "Touched" was performed solely by Ó Cíosóig without any contribution from the other members of the band.

During My Bloody Valentine's hiatus from the early 1990s onward, he had been prolific with various musical collaborations and guest appearances.

As of November 2007, he has reassumed his role in My Bloody Valentine along with members Kevin Shields, Debbie Googe, and Bilinda Butcher.

=== Hope Sandoval & the Warm Inventions ===
Ó Cíosóig's best known work outside My Bloody Valentine is with Hope Sandoval & the Warm Inventions. He had co-written, produced and played several instruments on their 2001 album Bavarian Fruit Bread. The band's second album Through the Devil Softly was released on 29 September 2009. He also toured with Sandoval's band Mazzy Star in 2012.

=== Other projects ===
In 1994, Ó Cíosóig produced and contributed "sampled keyboards" to Wreckage, the fifth album by Dublin-based artist/musician Stano. In 1997, he was a guest musician on Fire in a Dream Cage by L. Both albums were released on Hue Records. Ó Cíosóig was credited with "Digital Editing" on Laika's 1995 debut "Silver Apples of the Moon"

He formed the short-lived band Clear Spot with Stereolab bassist Simon Johns. They had released a 7" vinyl single Moonman Bop on Duophonic Records in 1998.

In 2004, Ó Cíosóig was a guest drummer on Vetiver's self-titled album. In 2005, he, along with Shields and Sandoval, contributed to Le Volume Courbe's debut album, and he was a guest musician on Film School's 2007 release Hideout.

In 2013, he joined Mr. Shineywater & evolved Rock-N-Roll with Library Of Sands title "Wavy Heat" Top 6 2013 U.K.'s UnCut Magazine, making the U.S. loudest Export Recording Art, after My Bloody Valentine was named the globe's "loudest live music" in 2009.

Ó Cíosóig also recorded songs for The Tigerbeat, a San Francisco-based band that features his sister Fionnuala.
