= Waywords and Meansigns =

Musical version of Finnegan's Wake

Waywords and Meansigns: Recreating Finnegans Wake [in its whole wholume] is an international project setting James Joyce's novel Finnegans Wake to music. Waywords and Meansigns has released two editions of audio, each offering an unabridged musical adaptation of Joyce's book. A third edition, featuring over 100 artists and performing much shorter passages of the book, debuted May 4, 2017.

The project brought together a diverse array of musicians. An artist or group performed each chapter in the first two editions; artists performed shorter, page-length passages in the third edition. The musicians only requirements were that "the words be audible, unabridged and more or less in their original order". With a goal of making Joyce's famously obscure novel more accessible, all audio from the project is distributed freely online.

== Background ==
The Waywords and Meansigns project began in 2014 with a goal of setting James Joyce's Finnegans Wake to music unabridged. The first edition, which premiered in 2015, featured a different artist or musical group performing each of the book's seventeen chapters. The second edition, which premiered in 2016, also offered an unabridged version of the book, performed by a different set of artists and musicians.

A third edition, dubbed the Waywords and Meansigns Opendoor Edition, premiered in 2017 with a focus on performing shorter passages rather than complete chapters. In an open edition, with contributors invited to create new recordings on an ongoing basis, the Opendoor Edition features over 100 contributors from 15 countries. Over 300 people have been involved in Waywords and Meansigns since 2014.

While some passages in Waywords and Meansigns adhere to traditional song structures, much of the music is experimental. The musicians' only requirements were that "the words be audible, unabridged and more or less in their original order." All audio from the project is distributed freely online under Creative Commons licensing. Finn Fordham, a James Joyce scholar at Royal Holloway, University of London has called the project "wonderfully innovative" and The Guardian has highlighted the project for making Joyce's famously difficult novel more accessible.

Contributors to Waywords and Meansigns are a self-described collection of "musicians, artists, poets, scholars, weirdos, passionate Wake-heads, those totally ignorant of the Wake, and anyone generally adventurous."

Waywords and Meansigns has been noted as a uniquely ambitious, and unusual, project. Rock critic Jesse Jarnow applauded Waywords and Meansigns for their innovative use of the digital platform and University College Dublin's Digital Platform for Contemporary Irish Writing includes Waywords and Meansigns in their "Joyce Today" collection.

== Editions ==
=== First edition ===
The first edition of Waywords and Meansigns premiered on May 4, 2015.

==== Track listing ====
Book I
I.1 - Fall, pp. 3–29 - Mariana Lanari & Sjoerd Leijten, with Erik Bindervoet
I.2 - The Humphriad I: His Agnomen and Reputation, pp. 30–47 - Robert Amos; Chelidon Frame; Alan Ó Raghallaigh
I.3 - The Humphriad II: His Trial and Incarceration, pp 48–74 - Greg Nahabedian
I.4 - The Humphriad III - His Demise and Resurrection, pp. 75–103 - Un monton, torero; with Charlie Driker-Ohren & Walker Storz
I.5 - The Mamafesta, pp. 104–25 - Tim Carbone (of Railroad Earth)
I.6 - Riddles: The Personages of the Manifesto, pp. 126–68 - Kevin Spenst
I.7 - Shem the Penman, pp. 169–216 - Belorusia
I.8 - Anna Livia, pp. 196–59 - Dérive

Book II
II.1 - The Children's Hour, pp. 216–59 - Street Kids Named Desire; with Derek Pyle, Parker McQueeney, Zach Leavitt & Samuel Nordli
II.2 - The Studies, pp. 260–308 - Liz Longo & Izzy Longo, with Leo Traversa
II.3 - The Stories: Tavernry in Feast, pp. 309–82 - Hayden Chisholm
II.4 - Mamalujo, pp. 383–99 - Ryan Mihaly

Book III
III.1 - Shaun before the People, pp. 403–28 - Gareth Flowers (of International Contemporary Ensemble)
III.2 - Jaun before St. Bride's, pp. 428–73 - Steve Fly, with William Sutton
III.3 - Yawn under Inquest, pp. 474–554 - Peter Quadrino, Jake Reading & Evan James
III.4 - Humphrey Chimpden Earwicker and Anna Livia Plurabelle: Their Bed of Trial, pp. 555–590 - Graziano Galati

Book IV
IV.1 - Dawn: Return to the Beginning, pp. 593–628 - Mariana Lanari & Sjoerd Leijten; with Eloísa Ejarque, Grace Kyne-Lilley, & Erik Bindervoet.

=== Second edition ===
The second edition of Waywords and Meansigns premiered on February 2, 2016.

==== Track listing ====
Book I
I.1 - The Fall, pp. 3–29 - Mr. Smolin & Double Naught Spy Car
I.2 - The Humphriad I: His Agnomen and Reputation, pp. 30–47 - David Kahne
I.3 - The Humphriad II: His Trial and Incarceration, the Acoustic Disturbance, pp 48–74 - Steve Gregoropoulos (of Lavender Diamond)
I.4 - The Humphriad III: His Demise and Resurrection, pp. 75–103 - Rio Matchett
I.5 - The Mamafesta of Anna Livia, pp. 104–25 - Neil Campbell
I.6 - Riddles: The Personages of the Manifesto, pp. 126–68 - Maharadja Sweets
I.7 - Shem the Penman, pp. 169–216 - Mike Watt & Adam Harvey (reportedly delayed; forthcoming in 2016)
I.8 - The Washers at the Ford (aka ALP), pp. 196–59 - Brian Hall & Mary Lorson

Book II
II.1 - The Children's Hour, pp. 216–59 - Robert Amos
II.2 - The Studies: Nightlessons, pp. 260–308 - Ollie Evans, Steve Potter & Co.
II.3 - The Stories: Tavernry in Feast, pp. 309–82 - Janken's Henchmæn
II.4 - Bride-Ship and Gulls, pp. 383–99 - Aleorta

Book III
III.1 - Shaun before the People, pp. 403–28 - SIKS
III.2 - Jaun before St. Bride's, pp. 428–73 - Kio Griffith
III.3 - Yawn under Inquest, pp. 474–554 - Hinson Calabrese (formerly of Tom Fun Orchestra)
III.4 - Humphrey Chimpden Earwicker and Anna Livia Plurabelle: Their Bed of Trial, pp. 555–590 - Conspirators of Pleasure (Poulomi Desai and Simon Underwood)

Book IV
IV.1 - Ricorso, pp. 593–628 riverrunning back to The Fall, pp. 3–29 - Graziano Galati

=== Third edition ===
The Waywords and Meansigns Opendoor Edition debuted May 4, 2017. This edition emphasizes brief passages rather than complete chapters, with over a hundred contributors from 15 different countries. As an open edition, listeners are invited to record their passages for inclusion.

Contributors include: Krzysztof Bartnicki; Martyn Bates; Gregory Betts; John Wolf Brennan; Neil Campbell; Tim Carbone of Railroad Earth and Lou Rogai of Lewis & Clarke as Cedar Sparks; Joe Cassidy of Butterfly Child; Hayden Chisholm; Conspirators of Pleasure (Poulomi Desai and Simon Underwood); Steve Gregoropoulos of Lavender Diamond; S.A. Griffin; David Hurn and Abigail Hopkins; 90s duo Insides; Kinski; Ulrich Krieger of Metal Machine Trio; Little Sparta (Band) with Sally Timms and Martin Billheimer; Seán Mac Erlaine; Jason Merritt (Whip), Kenneth Griffin (Favourite Sons, Rollerskate Skinny), Jason Sebastian Russo, and Paul Dillon (Mercury Rev); Phil Minton; David Moss and Boris Hegenbart; Papa Sprain; Chris Rael; Schneider TM; Gerry Smyth; Thrum’s Monica Queen and Johnny Smillie as Tenement and Temple; Owen Tromans; Jon Wahl of Claw Hammer; Mike Watt and Adam Harvey; and many more.

== Reception ==
While many reviews of Waywords and Meansigns celebrate the project for its uniqueness and ambition, other reviewers find the project's massive scope daunting. The project has been lauded for its digital distribution platform, utilizing Creative Commons licensing to freely distribute audio.

Writing for The Guardian, Billy Mills described Waywords and Meansigns as one of many Internet-based projects helping to make Joyce's famously obscure novel more approachable. While premiering advance audio from the second edition, Bort of Tiny Mix Tapes wrote "this massive undertaking will provide an endless supply of head scratches and cheers alike to its undertakers".

While reviewing Neil Campbell's contribution in The Wire, Dan Barrow spoke positively of the overall project: "As a putative adaptation of the Wake, does the approach of Waywords and Meansigns work? Undoubtedly." The James Joyce Centre dubbed the first edition "31 hours, 8 minutes, 11 seconds worth of delightful strangeness."

James Joyce scholar Finn Fordham called the project "wonderfully innovative" and described the second edition as "a series of unexpected transformations of this endlessly transformative text."

The open information site and public domain blog Open Culture featured all three editions of the project, writing of the first edition "as with all compilation albums, some tracks are better than others... It is definitely a labor of love." Open Culture wrote of the second edition: "these artists try to transcend ordinary ways of reading great literature, and clearly have lots fun in the doing".

Aodhán Kelly and Tom De Keyser reviewed the first edition of Waywords and Meansigns for the James Joyce Quarterly. Noting that "the project has gathered considerable interest among both the artistic community and Joyce enthusiasts and reading groups", Kelly and De Keyser wrote that "each track is... a unique and completely personal interpretation of an artist's reading of the text". The review concludes: "While we cannot say that we enjoyed the music in all instances, the project does attempt to bring challenging literature to a broader public... add[ing] another layer of richness to the life of the book with its own musical interpretation as a new form of cultural production".

Paste's Jay Horton wrote of the third edition: "It’s soon enough made clear that there are as many varieties of musical renderings as there are interpretations of its prose, which sparks the likely-unavoidable problem concerning the songs and the book they’re taken from and the ideas it (barely) contains – there’s just too damn many." In her PopMatters review, Maria Schurr wrote of the third edition: "the well of inspiration springing from Joyce's words is thrillingly infinite." Open Culture's Josh Jones deemed the third edition "one of the most appropriate responses to the novel in the 78 years since its publication."

== See also ==
- James Joyce
- Finnegans Wake
- Waywords and Meansigns Opendoor Edition
