= Waywords and Meansigns Opendoor Edition =

The Waywords and Meansigns Opendoor Edition debuted in 2017 as a part of the Waywords and Meansigns project, setting James Joyce's Finnegans Wake to music. The Opendoor Edition features over 100 artists and musicians performing unabridged passages of Finnegans Wake. An open edition participants are invited to contribute to the Opendoor Edition on an ongoing basis. The edition first premiered on May 4, 2017.

The genres in the Waywords and Meansigns Opendoor Edition are quite diverse, ranging from metal and industrial to folk and jazz. Many tracks are experimental; some recordings adhere to fairly traditional song formats, while others offer audiobook-like readings with ambient accompaniment.

== Background ==
The Waywords and Meansigns project began in 2014 to set James Joyce's Finnegans Wake to music unabridged. They released two unabridged editions of the text in 2015 and 2016. Over 300 people have been involved in Wayords and Meansigns since 2014.

The Waywords and Meansigns Opendoor Edition features contributors from 15 countries in "an all-star cast of weirdos." The music is often experimental; the musicians' only requirements were that "the words be audible, unabridged and more or less in their original order." All audio from the project is distributed freely online under Creative Commons licensing.

Contributors to Waywords and Meansigns are a self-described collection of "musicians, artists, poets, scholars, weirdos, passionate Wake-heads, those ignorant of the Wake, and anyone generally adventurous." Artists participating in the Opendoor Edition include Krzysztof Bartnicki, Martyn Bates, John Wolf Brennan, Neil Campbell, Tim Carbone of Railroad Earth and Lou Rogai of Lewis & Clarke, Joe Cassidy of Butterfly Child, Hayden Chisholm, S.A. Griffin; Kinski, Ulrich Krieger, Jason Sebastian Russo, David Moss, Monica Queen, Schneider TM, Sally Timms, Mike Watt, and many more.

The Guardian has highlighted the project for making Joyce's famously difficult novel more accessible. Finn Fordham, a James Joyce scholar at Royal Holloway, University of London, has called the project "wonderfully innovative."

== Track listing ==
Tracks are organized by page and line number, followed by the artist name, and then occasionally followed by the track's nickname.

Chapter 1 (pp. 003–029)
003-010.24 - The Here Comes Everybody Players
003.01-003.09 - Hervé Michel and the box sets
003.01-003.14 - Roman Tsivkin and the box sets
010.25-016.09 - Chris Rael
013.20-015.11 - Peter Chrisp and the box sets
018.17-021.04 - John Cerreta - "Stoop to Prittle"
023.16-024.14 - Nigel Bryant - "O Foenix Culprit"
027.22-029.36 - Cedar Sparks (Tim Carbone and Lou Rogai)

Chapter 2 (pp. 030–047)
030-047 - Krzysztof Bartnicki and Bouchons d'oreilles with Wojtek Kurek
045-046 - Yehuda Vizan and the box sets

Chapter 3 (pp. 048–074)
048-050.35 - Wiel Conen & Charlotte Gilissen
052.18-053.35 - S.A. Griffin
053.36-055.02 - Joe Cassidy
055.03-056.19 - Neal Kosaly-Meyer
061.15-061.16 - Seán Mac Erlaine - "Nooningless Knockturne"
066.28-067.06 - Graziano Galati
067.07-067.27 - Schneider TM - "His Phizz Fell"
071.10-072.16 - Jon Wahl - "Abusive Names"

Chapter 4 (pp. 075–103)
75-103 - Matthew Duncan and James Heflin

Chapter 5 (pp. 104–125)
104-125 - Tim Cornelius
107 - Hayden Chisholm

Chapter 6 (pp. 126–168)
136.01-136.36 - Lavinia Murrary - "Mursque"
139.15-139.28 - Maharajah - "Ann Alive"
139.29-140.07 - Maharadja Sweets
140.08-141.07 - Papa Sprain
141.08-141.27 - Coldharbourstores - "Question 5"
141.28-142.29 - Old Fiends (Jason Merritt, Kenneth Griffin, Jason Sebastian Russo, and Paul Dillon)
142.30-143.02 - Little Sparta with Sally Timms and Martin Billheimer - "Question 6. How Are Yor Maggies"
148.33-152.15 - Kevin Spenst and Hitori Tori - "Question 11"
152.16-159.18 - Mr. Smolin - "The Mooks & The Gripes"
159.19-163.07 - William Sutton
163.08-165.07 - Conspirators of Pleasure (Simon Underwood and Poulomi Desai)

Chapter 7 (pp. 169–195)
169-195 - Gavan Kennedy
169-195 - Mike Watt and Adam Harvey - "Shem the Penman"
170.25-174.04 - Layne Farmen of "Faraday"
174.05-175.06 - The Philip Cleary Ensemble - "The Cull"
175.07-175.28 - Mr. Smolin - "The Ballat of Perce Oreille"
175.29-181.33 - The Philip Cleary Ensemble - "a Dubliner (and a spy)"
181.34-182.29 - Karen Ponzio

Chapter 8 (pp. 196–216)
205.16-210.06 - Joe Fee - "Anna Livia"
213.11-216 - Re-Scribe
215.36 - Seán Mac Erlaine - "My Ho Head Halls"

Chapter 9 (pp. 216–259)
223.12-224.07 - Sauerbraten Beef Ring - "Nought A Wired From The Wordless Either"
224.08-226.20 - Lucy Hollier - "The Pearlagraph"
226.21-228.02 - David Hurn and Abigail Hopkins
228.03-229.01 - Joel Wranning
229.01-229.29 - Owen Tromans
229.29-230.25 - Brendan Kinsella and Brian Tyree
230.26-231.22 - STV
231.23-232.26 - Michael Maier and Brian Tyree
254.01-254.08 - Chelidon Frame - "Our Seawall"
254.08-254.09 - Mr. Smolin - "Ancients Link With Presents"
254.09-254.17 - Lys Guillorn - "Have Done, Do and Will Again"
254.18-254.29 - Lys Guillorn - "The Mar of Murmury"
254.29-255.03 - Lys Guillorn - "Hoet of the Rough Throat Attack"
256.01-259.10 - Gareth Flowers
257.29-259.10 - Krzysztof Bartnicki and the box sets

Chapter 10 (pp. 260–308)
260-270.31 - Super Nova Nudge
263.17-263.30 - Liz Longo
266.20 - Liz Longo
273.01-273.28 - Phil Minton
274.02-275.13 - Gregory Betts
284.04 - Seán Mac Erlaine - "Brick Bath"
288, fn. 1 - Seán Mac Erlaine - "An Ounceworth of Onions for a Pennyawealth of Sobs"
293.01-300.08 - Sticky Foster and Usurper
304.05-305.11 - Janken's Henchmæn featuring Marco Toriani - "Magic J Amezons"
305.08-306.07 - Janken's Henchmæn - "FAQ Deady"
306.08-306.10 - Janken's Henchmæn featuring MonkeYear - "Aen.C"
306.16-306.31 - Janken's Henchmæn featuring MonkeYear - "Frogterdati"
307 - Greg Nahabedian
308 - body bender - "Delays"

Chapter 11 (pp. 309–382)
310.22-311.20 - Doug Eisenstark
310.22-311.20 - Matt Battle
311.21-312.16 - Insides
312.17-313.13 - Barry Bender - "To Old Sporty"
313.14-314.14 - M. David Hornbuckle - "Whereofter"
314.15-315.08 - Alek Erickson
316.11-319.02 - Steve Fly
319.03-319.36 - Cathal O' Leary
322.01-323.24 - Kinski
323.25-324.17 - Tenement and Temple (Monica Queen and Johnny Smillie)
324.18-326.20 - Renata Meints
326.21-326.36 - Tom Segear
329.14-330.11 - Steve Pantani - "And Dub Did Glow"
330.20-332.09 - John Wolf Brennan
332.10-333.05 - David Moss & Boris Hegenbart - "stepping the tolks"
333.06-334.05 - meunders
372.23-373.12 - Haunted Robot, Ltd. and Dameon Merkl - "Last ye, lundsmin"
380.07-382.30 - The Science Of Deduction

Chapter 12 (pp. 383–399)
383-399 - Andrea Riley's Opendoor Score - Score only, record your own interpretation or performance!!

Chapter 13 (pp. 403–428)
403-418.08 - Ross&Wayne
403.01-405.02 - Candle
418.09-419.08 - Ross&Wayne
418.10-419.08 - Aleorta - "Grace ondt Hope"
419.09-428 - Ross&Wayne
429 - Mary and Sara Jewell

Chapter 14 (pp. 429–473)
446.11 - Seán Mac Erlaine - "Zuccherikissings"
446.16-446.17 - Seán Mac Erlaine - "Rainkiss on Me Back"

Chapter 15 (pp. 474–554)
494.27-497.03 - Layne Farmen of "Faraday"
499.04-499.36 - Human Flourishing
500.01-501.06 - Adam Matlock
504.20-505.31 - Belorusia
506.34-509.36 - Rod Stasick - "Peace Antiques"
510.01-510.36 - Junklight
511.01-511.36 - Hardworking Families
512.01-512.20 - PhÆDRx - "To The Pink, Man!"
534.07-535.12 - Neil Campbell - "Calm Has Entered"
538.18-540.36 - Ulrich Krieger - "Finnegans Longstone"
540.09-550.03 - Bruce Woodside - "Haveth Childers Everywhere"
550.04-554.10 - At it Again!

Chapter 16 (pp. 555–590)
556.01-556.22 - Martyn Bates - "Night by Silentsailing Night"
589.12-589.19 - Stanton Warren - "...and the band played on"

Chapter 17 (pp. 593–628)
593 - Adrian DiMatteo
594.01-595.29 - Rich Chapman
595.30-596.33 - watercodes
596.34-597.23 - Epiphany Now
597.24-598.27 - Hayden Chisholm
598.17-600.04 - Mariana Lanari and Sjoerd Leijten - "Supernoctural"
598.28-599.24 - Les orages de janvier - "Sable Rampant"
601.21-602.08 - Cathal O' Leary
602.09-603.33 - Mark Sheeky - "Finnegan's Judgement"
603.34-604.22 - Kaia Jackson
604.22-606.12 - Gerry Smyth
606.13-607.16 - Doug Eisenstark
607.17-607.36 - John Shakespear - "High Tigh Tigh"
608.01-608.36 - Asha Passalacqua
609.01-609.36 - Ken Davidson
610-611.02 - The Most Ever Company - "Muta & Juva"
613.01-615.11 - Peter Quadrino - "Vicocyclometer"
615.12-619.16 - Kamil Szuszkiewicz featuring Pictorial Candi - "Pollabella"
627.34-003.18 - Steve Gregoropoulos - "Recirculation"

== Reception ==
The Opendoor Edition's music received generally positive reviews, including a 7.8 rating from Paste. Open Culture's Josh Jones deemed the Opendoor Edition "one of the most appropriate responses to the novel in the 78 years since its publication." Other writers did not review the music but focused primarily on the project's ambitious and unusual nature.

In her PopMatters review, Maria Schurr wrote: "The well of inspiration springing from Joyce's words is thrillingly infinite." Paste's Jay Horton wrote of the third edition: "It's soon enough made clear that there are as many varieties of musical renderings as there are interpretations of its prose, which sparks the likely-unavoidable problem concerning the songs and the book they're taken from and the ideas it (barely) contains – there's just too damn many." Culture.pl described listeners as "wallowing in the infinite possible meanings that Finnegans Wake inspires."

== See also ==
- James Joyce
- Finnegans Wake
- Waywords and Meansigns
