= Bartnicki =

Bartnicki (feminine: Bartnicka; plural: Bartniccy) is a Polish surname. Notable people with the surname include:

- Bartłomiej Bartnicki (born 1981), Polish wrestler
- Krzysztof Bartnicki (born 1971), Polish writer and musician

== See also ==
- Bartnicki v. Vopper, United States Supreme Court case
