= Poulomi =

Poulomi Ganguli is an Indian feminine given name. Notable people with the name include:

- Poulomi Das (born 1996), Indian model and television actress
- Poulomi Desai, Indian multimedia artist
- Poulomi Ghatak (born 1983), Indian table tennis player
