= Eileen Shields =

Irish shoe designer

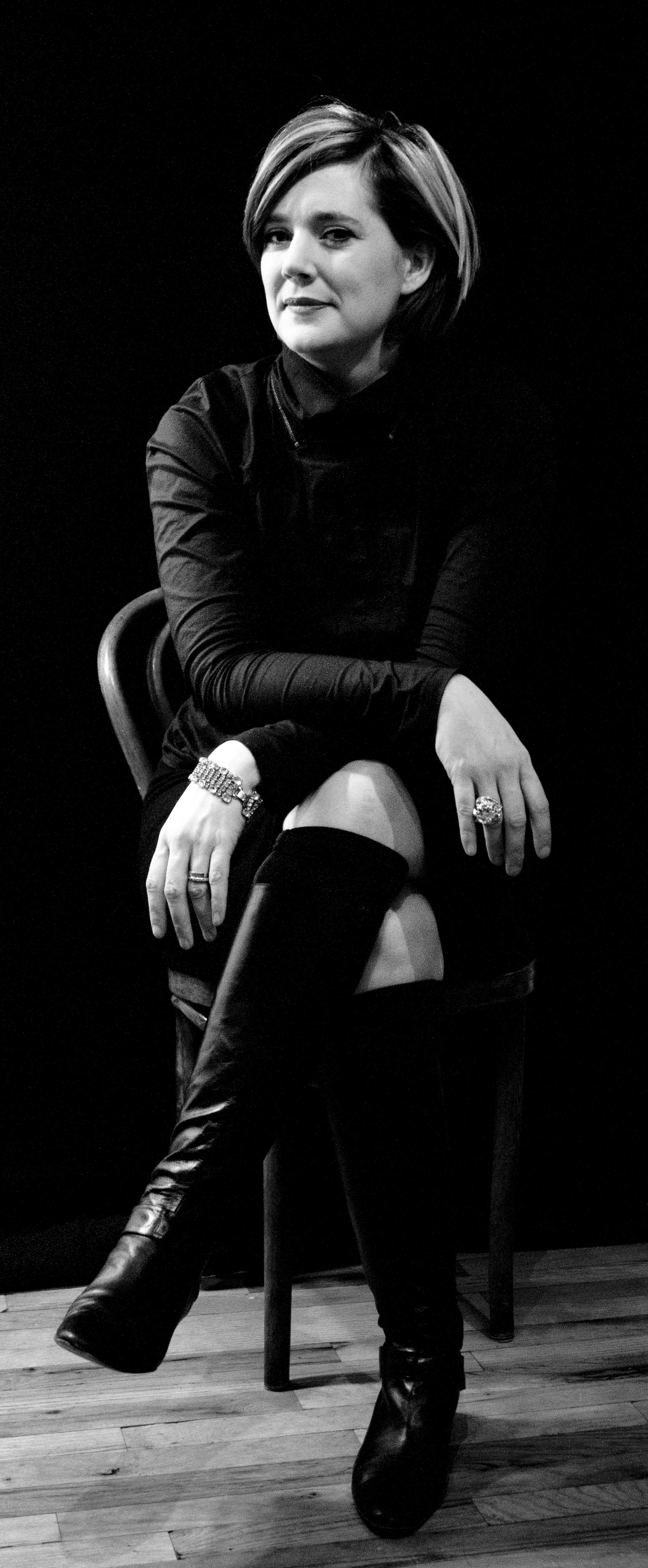
Eileen Shields

Eileen Shields (born 1969 or 1970) is a footwear designer and owner of the EILEEN SHIELDS label and the Dublin-based store/gallery "5 Scarlet Row". Shields's shoe designs have been worn by a number of celebrities, including Eva Longoria's character on Desperate Housewives. Shields has made custom shoes for Bono, Halle Berry, Eva Longoria, Courteney Cox Arquette, and Drew Barrymore.

== Early and personal life ==
Shields is the youngest of five siblings born to a mother who worked as a nurse and a food-industry executive father. Born in New York to Irish parents, she moved to Dublin with her family when she was two. Her brothers are musicians Kevin Shields of My Bloody Valentine, and Jimi Shields known for his work in Rollerskate Skinny. Her two sisters work in the music industry and education.

Shields is married to artist Mark Orange. They have two sons.

== Early career ==
After graduating from the National College of Art and Design in Dublin with a Bachelor of Arts degree, Shields moved to New York in 1988 to begin her design career. She took classes at Fashion Institute of Technology (FIT) and went to work as a show designer for Anne Klein. Shields later worked for Donna Karan and was involved with launching the DKNY footwear line.

== Label and collection ==
The EILEEN SHIELDS label was launched in February 2004, and she went on to open her own store and gallery, "5 Scarlet Row" near Essex Street West in Dublin in September 2004. This store sells the EILEEN SHIELDS collection alongside clothes and accessories by other designers, including Eley Kishimoto, Sharon Wauchob, Collection Privée, Zero Maria Cornejo, VPL (Visible Panty Line), Helen James and UNIS. Shields' collections are also sold online and at retail stores in the US, Europe, and Asia.
