= Barry Smolin =

American singer-songwriter

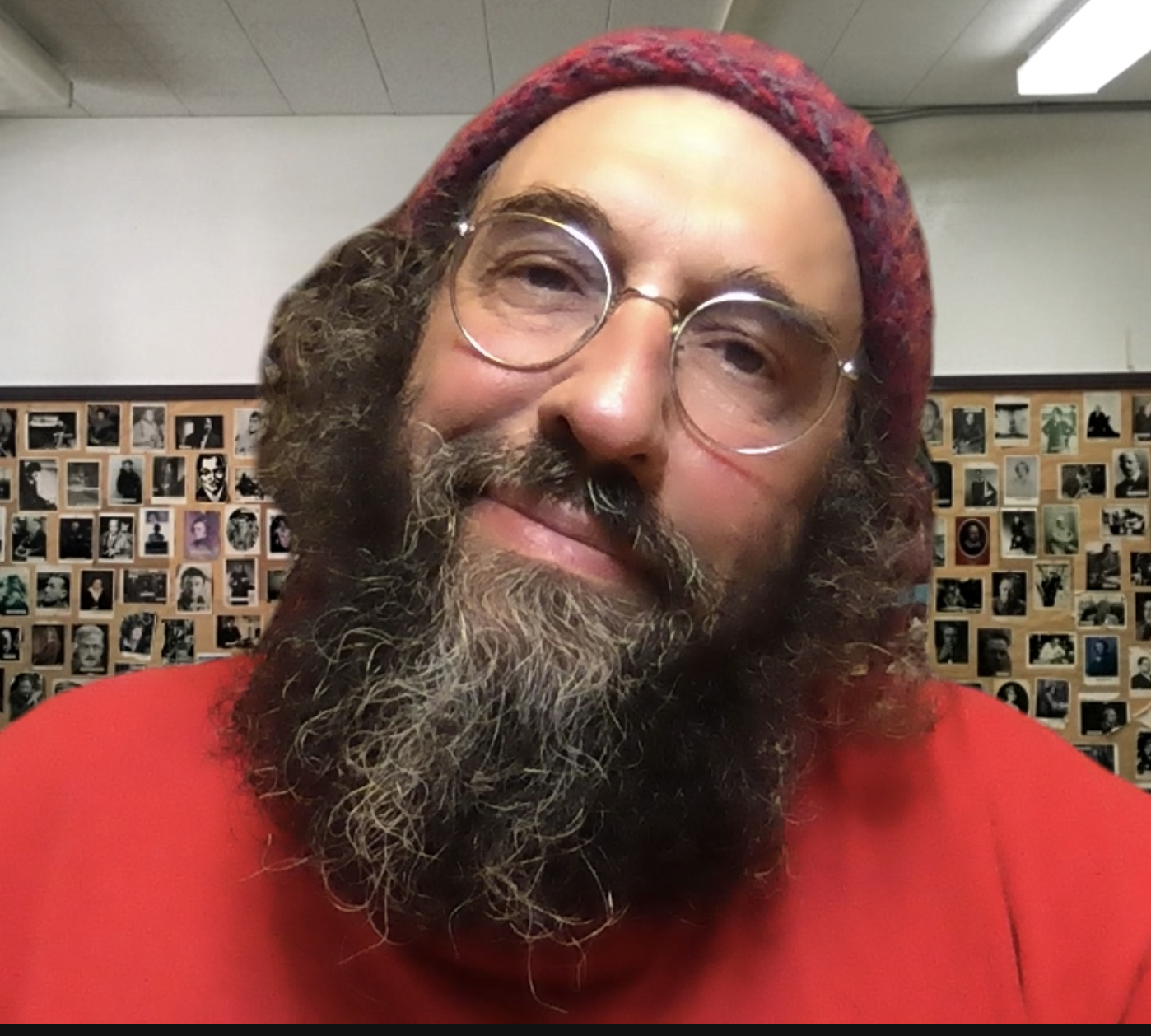

Background information
- Also known as: Mr. Smolin
- Origin: Los Angeles, California

Barry Smolin, also known as Mr. Smolin, is an American radio host, former teacher, composer, and writer. He last taught at Alexander Hamilton High School in Los Angeles before the revocation of his teaching credential, and was a longtime radio host on L.A. area public radio station KPFK.

== Career ==
=== Radio ===
==== The Music Never Stops ====
From 1995 to 2012, Smolin was the host of The Music Never Stops, a psychedelic radio show on KPFK in Los Angeles, California for which Smolin won the first ever Jammy Award for "Best Radio Show" in 2000. Smolin's program was also nominated for an LA Weekly Music Award in 2004 in the "Best Radio Show" category. The Music Never Stops began as a program featuring live recordings of the Grateful Dead, but after the death of Jerry Garcia; Smolin expanded the scope of the show to include contemporary jam-rock and miscellaneous psychedelia, paying special attention to music being made by musicians in Los Angeles. The program has been covered in Relix magazine.

==== Head Room ====
Smolin was host of the program Head Room on KPFK, up until the program's abrupt cancellation in April 2021. Head Room's final broadcast was on April 25, 2021.

=== Teaching ===
Smolin's teaching career has been featured in articles in Time and the Los Angeles Times, as well as in the Larchmont Chronicle, and the Library Foundation of L.A.'s "My Moby-Dick" tribute. From 1987 to 1992, Smolin taught English at Fairfax High School (the school Smolin himself graduated from in 1978) in the Los Angeles Unified School District. Since leaving Fairfax in 1992, he was on the faculty at Alexander Hamilton High School, teaching English in the Hamilton Humanities Magnet program until 2021. His teaching credential was revoked in July 2022 due to misconduct.

=== Music ===
==== Pop music ====
As a songwriter, Smolin has composed music for the Showtime television series Weeds, with his song "The Earth Keeps Turning On" appearing in Season 3's Episode 7, entitled "He Taught Me How to Drive By" as well as on the Weeds Season 3 soundtrack album. Under the performance moniker Mr. Smolin he has released four albums, At Apogee (2004) and The Crumbling Empire of White People (2007) (both produced by Tony Award-winning composer/dramatist Stew), and a Los Angeles song cycle entitled Bring Back The Real Don Steele (2009).

==== Experimental music ====
Since 2016, Smolin has primarily composed experimental pieces, both instrumental and spoken word. With Double Naught Spy Car, he set chapter 1 of James Joyce's Finnegans Wake to music as part of the Waywords and Meansigns project, which was released in 2016 as was an album of the project's instrumental tracks called That Tragoady Thundersday. In September 2017, he released an instrumental album entitled The Sooterkin Library, a trio project that Smolin describes as "12-tone avant-freak mongrel psycho-tonk".

=== Writing ===
Smolin is the author of two novellas: Narcissus in the Dark (2012), whose narrator is God sentenced to eternity in a dungeon and whose consciousness thinks new universes into being while sorting through the detritus of his troubled past, and the experimental prose project Wake Up in the Dreamhouse, composed one sentence at a time on Twitter. In May 2011, Smolin released a volume of selected poetry covering 1988 to 2010 entitled Always Be Madly in Love. His most recent fiction project is a trilogy entitled The Miranda Complex, Volume 1 of which was published in 2016 with Volume 2 following in 2017, and the concluding Volume 3 in 2018.

== Discography ==
- At Apogee (2004), produced by Stew
- The Crumbling Empire Of White People (2007), produced by Stew
- Bring Back The Real Don Steele (2009)
- Heaven's Not High (2013)
- Fairfax High School (single, 2015)
- The Man I Met Once (single, 2015)
- Mutt and Jute (single, 2016)
- Finnegans Wake Chapter 1 (Waywords and Meansigns, 2016)
- That Tragoady Thundersday (2016)
- The Sooterkin Library (2017)
- The Mookse & The Gripes (2018)
- Mysterium Fidei (2018)
- The Mole With A Hole In The Whole Of Him (2018)
- The Five Decades (2018)
- The Four Mysteries (2018)
- My Lunch With Lautréamont (2018)
- Baby Methuselah (2019)
- Ancients Link With Presents As The Human Chain Extends (2019)
- Always Be Madly In Love (2019)
- unspoken (2019)
- The Age of Endarkenment (2019)
- Before You Know It (2019)
- Water Signs (2019)
- The Day I Met Blassie & Tolos (2019)
- The Humpback of Nostradamus (2019)
- Play Free (2019), with Vince Meghrouni
- The Fantastic Catch (2020)
- Eyelid Movies (2020)
- Outside Norms (2020)
- Say No More (2020)
- Antediluvian Future (2020)
- Lurch (2020)
- Smoke on the Altar (2020)
- The Minerva Syndrome (2020)
- Remember My Chains (2020)
- Doo-Dads (2020)
- The God Paradox (2020)
- Havdalah Sonata (2020)
- That's What They All Say (2020)
- Pretend To Play (2020)
- In the Name of Zarking Fardwarks (2020)
- Slide Down My Rainbow (2020)
- Hypostasy (2020), with Vince Meghrouni
- Strange Fire (2020)
- Great Seizure's Ghost (2020)
- Radio Andromeda (2020)
- Frenching (2021)
- Ode To Billy Jack (2021)
- Maps To Stars Homes (2021)
- A Jew In Space (2021)
- Underworld Orchestra (2021)
- We Are The Ancestors (2021)
- When A Weasel Steals Your Chumetz (2021)
- I Knew It By The River (2021)
- A Trespass Offering (2021)
- Tender Buttons (2021)
- A Pocketful of Poesies (2021)
- Deep In The Sea-Meant Pond (2021)
- We Hear Voices (2021)

== Bibliography ==
- Wake Up In The Dreamhouse (2011)
- Always Be Madly In Love (2011)
- Narcissus In The Dark (2012)
- The Miranda Complex Volume 1: Munchkinland (2016)
- The Miranda Complex Volume 2: Poppies (2017)
- The Miranda Complex Volume 3: The Man Behind The Curtain (2018)
