= Jimi Shields =

- Born: James J. Shields; 1967 (age 58–59)
- Origin: New York
- Occupations: Musician, Architect
- Instruments: Vocals, guitar, drums
- Years active: 1991–present

Jimi Shields (born James J. Shields; 1967), is an Irish musician and architect. He was a member of 1990s indie rock group Rollerskate Skinny. He formed the band the Wounded Knees with former Mercury Rev flutist Suzanne Thorpe in 2001. He established TTT - (thirtythreetrees) with his wife Maria Vlahos in 2004.

== Personal life ==
Shields is one of five siblings born to a mother who worked as a nurse and a food-industry executive father. The family immigrated to Dublin when he was a child. My Bloody Valentine leader Kevin Shields is his older brother and shoe designer Eileen Shields is his younger sister. Shields is a graduate of Technological University Dublin – Bolton Street. Shields has three daughters with wife and partner Maria Vlahos.

== Career ==
Shields started playing drums as a teenager with lessons from Brian Downey of Thin Lizzy. Shields went on to form Rollerskate Skinny with members of the band Shake in 1991 as guitarist/drummer/vocalist. He played on, co-produced and wrote much of their debut 1993 Shoulder Voices LP, as well as on the Novice (1992), Trophy (1993), and Threshold (1994) EPs. He wrote and recorded a song with Mercury Rev's David Baker for his Shady project in 1994. Shields left Rollerskake Skinny in 1994 and moved from Dublin to Chicago.

While in Chicago, he formed Lotus Crown, and released Chokin' on the Jokes on Reprise Records in 1997. In 2002 Shields worked with Martina Topley-Bird as touring drummer and in 2008, with the Wounded Knees, he released the "All Rise" EP on limited-edition 10" brown vinyl featuring J Mascis and played a string of tour dates supporting Dinosaur Jr. Shields later recorded drum sessions with brother Kevin Shields for sampling purposes on My Bloody Valentine's 2013 release m b v.

Shields is design director of TTT - (thirtythreetrees), an award-winning landscape architecture and garden design practice based in Dublin City. Shields established the practice with his wife Maria Vlahos in 2004. Tolka Estuary Greenway, at Dublin Port, and the Marconi Wireless Station, at Derrigimlagh, are among the award-winning works designed by Shields.
