= Sandrider (band) =

American grunge metal band

- Origin: Seattle, Washington, United States
- Genres: Grunge, Hard rock, Heavy Metal, Sludge Metal
- Years active: 2008–present
- Label: Good to Die Records
- Members: Jon Weisnewski; Nat Damm; Jesse Roberts

Sandrider is an American grunge metal band from Seattle, Washington. The band is currently composed of former Akimbo band members Jon Weisnewski and Nat Damm, as well as Jesse Roberts from The Ruby Doe. As of 2016 the band has released four full-length albums and a split EP with Kinski on Good to Die Records.

== Members ==
- Jon Weisnewski - guitar / vocals
- Nat Damm - drums
- Jesse Roberts - bass / vocals

== Discography ==
- Sandrider (2011)
- Godhead (2013)
- Sandrider + Kinski Split EP (2015)
- Armada (2018)
- Enveletration (2023)
