= Surface of Eceon =

American rock band

Surface of Eceon (or Surface of Eceyon) is an American rock band. Their music has been described as ambient space rock. This unit, which has a penchant for the phantasmagoric, includes members from the psychedelic rock groups, Landing and Yume Bitsu. They released three albums between 2001 and 2007 as well as other recordings.

== Current line-up ==
- Dick Baldwin: guitar
- Adam Forkner: guitar, vocals
- Daron Gardner: bass guitar
- Phil Jenkins: percussion
- Aaron Snow: guitar, synthesizer and vocals

== Discography ==
- The King Beneath the Mountain CD (released via Strange Attractors on November 13, 2001)
- Dragyyn CD (released via Strange Attractors on June 3, 2003)
- Crickets and Fireflies CD (split album with Kinski and Paik released by Music Fellowship in 2004)
- Revenge of Dragon LP (released via Music Fellowship in 2007)
