= West Harrow =

Locality to the west of Harrow, London

Coordinates: 51.579710°N 0.353380°W

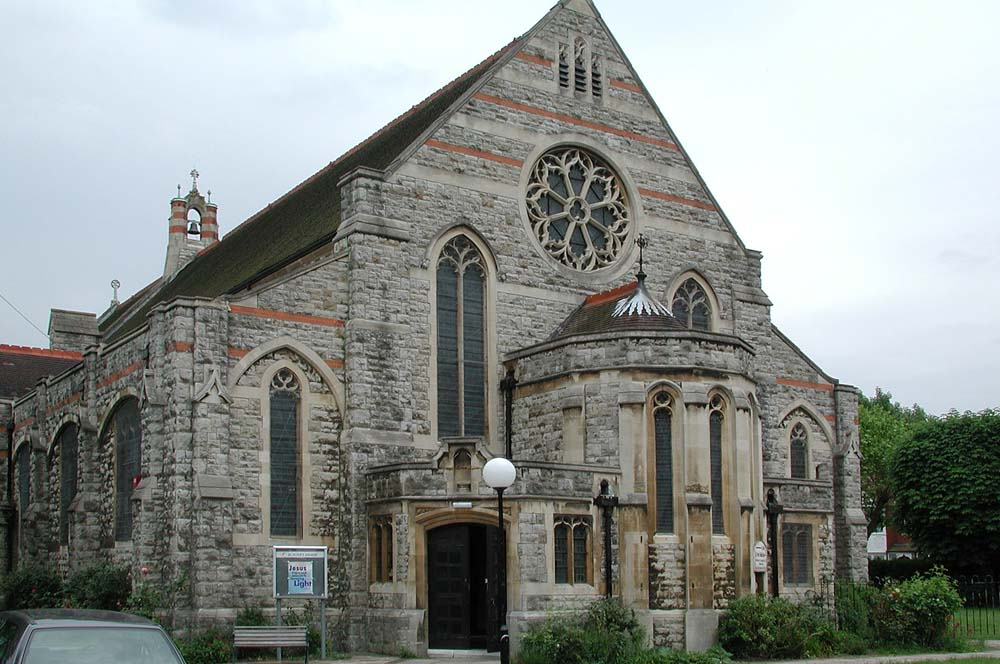
- St Peter's Church on Sumner Road

- Location within Greater London
- Population: 10,363 (2021 Census. Ward)
- OS grid reference: TQ145875
- London borough: Harrow
- Ceremonial county: Greater London
- Region: London
- Country: England
- Sovereign state: United Kingdom
- Post town: Harrow
- Postcode district: HA1, HA2
- Dialling code: 020
- Police: Metropolitan
- Fire: London
- Ambulance: London
- UK Parliament: Harrow West
- London Assembly: Brent and Harrow

West Harrow is a suburban area in the London Borough of Harrow that forms the western part of Harrow, historically in the county of Middlesex.

The area was rural until the late 19th century when the Metropolitan Railway expanded into Harrow. In the early 20th century, the area was developed into predominantly residential estates.

== History ==
At the start of the 20th century, fields and farmland comprised the area that is now present-day West Harrow. Situated on Bessborough Road at the western foot of Harrow Hill, three farms (Honeybun, Roxborough, and Roxeth) were later developed into what became known as the Bessborough Estate. The Roxeth farmhouse still stands and gained Grade II listed status in 1951.

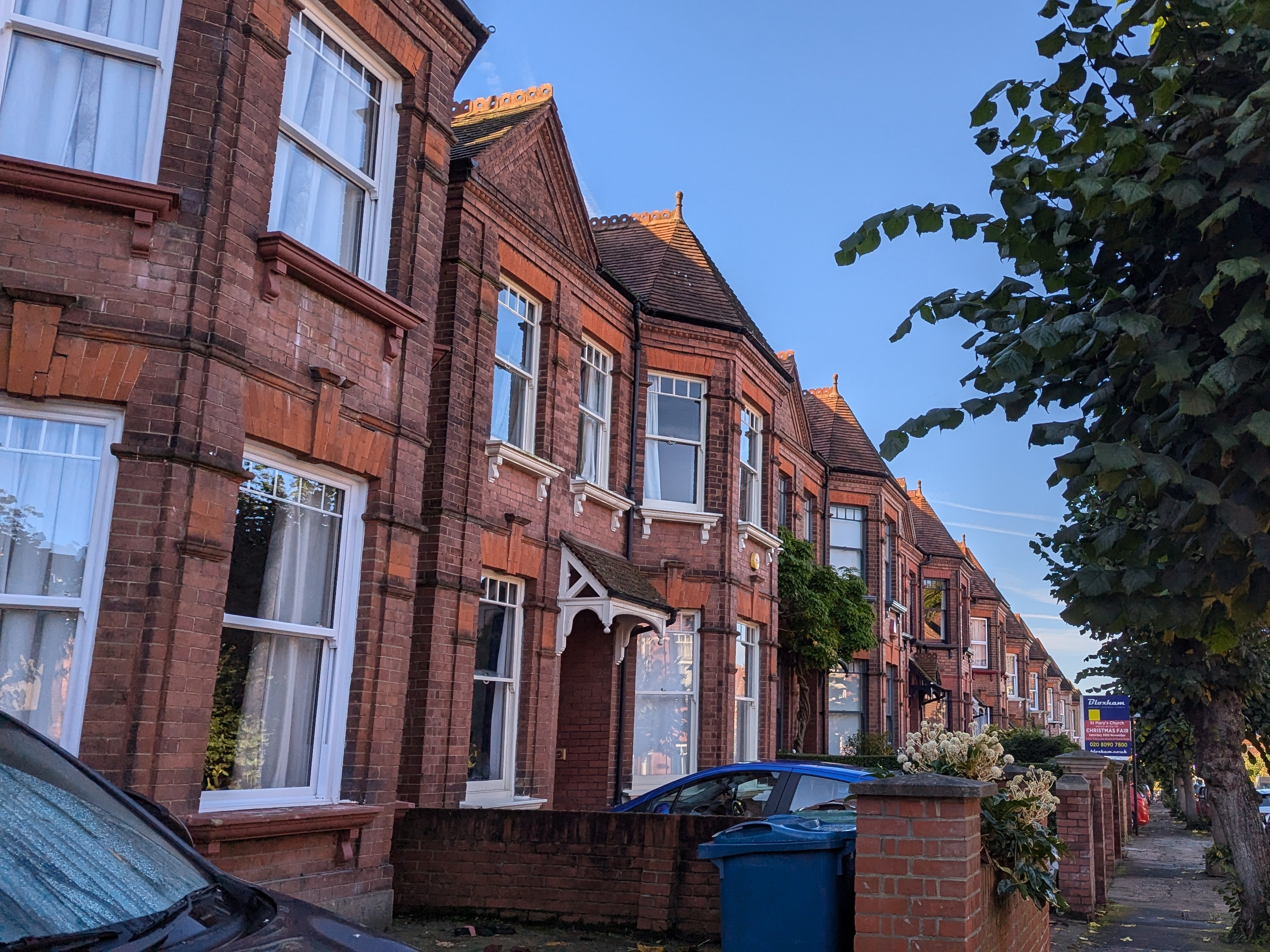
Victorian era houses on Butler Avenue

As the Metropolitan Railway extended to Harrow late in the 19th century, residential developments, including on the nearby Roxborough Park, sprung up in the surrounding area. In 1898, development began on the roads in the Bessborough Estate, and they were largely completed by 1911. The roads in the estate were named after former Harrow School headmasters, including Charles John Vaughan (Vaughan Road), George Butler or Henry Montagu Butler (Butler Road and Butler Avenue), Robert Carey Sumner (Sumner Road) and Joseph Drury (Drury Road). West Harrow Recreation Ground was added in 1923, and house building further west of the estate near Shaftesbury Avenue continued into the 1930s. The Metropolitan Railway marketed the developments of the early 20th century as Metro-land. In John Betjeman's acclaimed documentary Metro-land (1973), he stands on Vaughan Road as he ponders the "nice little speculation" at the "foot of Harrow Hill, alongside the Metropolitan electric trains", "built in the '80s or '90s".

The Metropolitan Railway laid tracks through the area in 1904 as it extended towards Uxbridge. Initially, no station was built in the area. However, as the Bessborough Estate expanded, landowners and residents pressured the Metropolitan Railway to build one nearby (Harrow-on-the-Hill being the closest at the time). In 1913, a wooden halt accessible from Vaughan Road was built. The station platforms were reconstructed in 1971, and the station further renovated in 1989.

In 2024, Harrow Council recommended a resident consultation after proposing West Harrow Recreation Ground and parts of Butler Road and Lance Road for designation as Local Areas of Special Character (LASC). The well-preserved quality of Victorian and Edwardian architecture was noted, as was the historical association of the street names to Harrow School.

== Governance ==
Boundaries of the West Harrow ward within the London Borough of Harrow since 2022

West Harrow lies within the London Borough of Harrow, governed under the local authority of Harrow London Borough Council. The West Harrow ward dates back to 1934, when it was established as a ward of the Harrow Urban District, albeit with ward boundary revisions which have since changed the area it represents.

Ahead of the 2022 revisions, focus groups noted the ward lacked community identity. The changes proposed by the council compacted the ward and transferred some areas from neighbouring wards, including Harrow on the Hill, to reflect what the community identifies as West Harrow. Additionally, the number of councillors representing the ward was reduced from three to two.

In 2022, Labour candidates Rekha Shah and Asif Hussain were elected as councillors to represent the ward of West Harrow, while the Conservative Party took control of the council.

West Harrow is in the Brent and Harrow constituency for the London Assembly which has been represented since 2021 by Krupesh Hirani (Labour). It is also in the Harrow West parliamentary constituency, which has been represented since 1997 by Gareth Thomas (Labour).

Borough Election – West Harrow ward (2022)
Party	Candidate	Votes	%	±%
Labour	Rekha Shah	1,507	54.7	
Labour	Asif Hussain	1,459	52.9	
Conservative	Luke Andrew Titus Wilson	911	33.0	
Conservative	Caroline Mojisola Ojo	849	30.8	
Green	Monika Sobiecki	437	15.9	
Liberal Democrats	Em Dean	351	12.7	
Turnout		2841	40	

== Geography ==
West Harrow is located on the western side of Harrow, roughly covering the area west of Bessborough Road, south of Pinner Road and north of Whitmore Road. The area lacks a town centre, but its proximity to Harrow town centre and North Harrow provides residents with walkable alternatives for amenities.

In the area near West Harrow station, Victorian and Edwardian terraces dominate the urban landscape. Many of these have now been converted into flats. Further south near Shaftesbury Circle, the neighbourhood consists of mostly inter-war housing stock, including many maisonettes. There are also shopping facilities on Shaftesbury Circle itself.

In the 2021 census, 31.5% of households in the ward were reported as semi-detached, 28.3% terraced, 24.5% flats and 10.9% converted or shared properties. West Harrow ranked first in the London Borough of Harrow for households classified as Caravan or other mobile structure, with a total of 4 (0.11%).

== Demography ==
Religion in West Harrow ward (2021)
1. Christian (37.0%)
2. Hindu (19.6%)
3. Muslim (18.4%)
4. No Religion (15.9%)
5. Buddhist (1.10%)
6. Sikh (0.90%)
7. Jewish (0.30%)
8. Other Religions (1.00%)
9. Religion not Stated (5.90%)

According to the 2021 census, 39.5% of the population of the West Harrow ward identified as White, followed by Asian, Asian British or Asian Welsh at 36.3% and Black, Black British, Black Welsh, Caribbean or African at 10.7%. The ward ranked first in the London Borough of Harrow for people identifying as Mixed or Multiple ethnic groups at 5.66%.

In the 2021 census, 37.0% of respondents identified as Christian followed by 19.6% as Hindu and 18.4% as Muslim. The ward ranked third in Harrow among those identifying as No Religion at 15.86%.

Harrow is the second safest borough in the Greater London Authority area.

Ethnic group	2021 Census	
Ethnic group	Population	%
Asian, Asian British or Asian Welsh	3,763	36.3
Black, Black British, Black Welsh, Caribbean or African	1,107	10.7
Mixed or Multiple ethnic groups	587	5.7
White	4,098	39.5
Other ethnic group	807	7.8
Total	10,362	100.0

== Culture and community ==
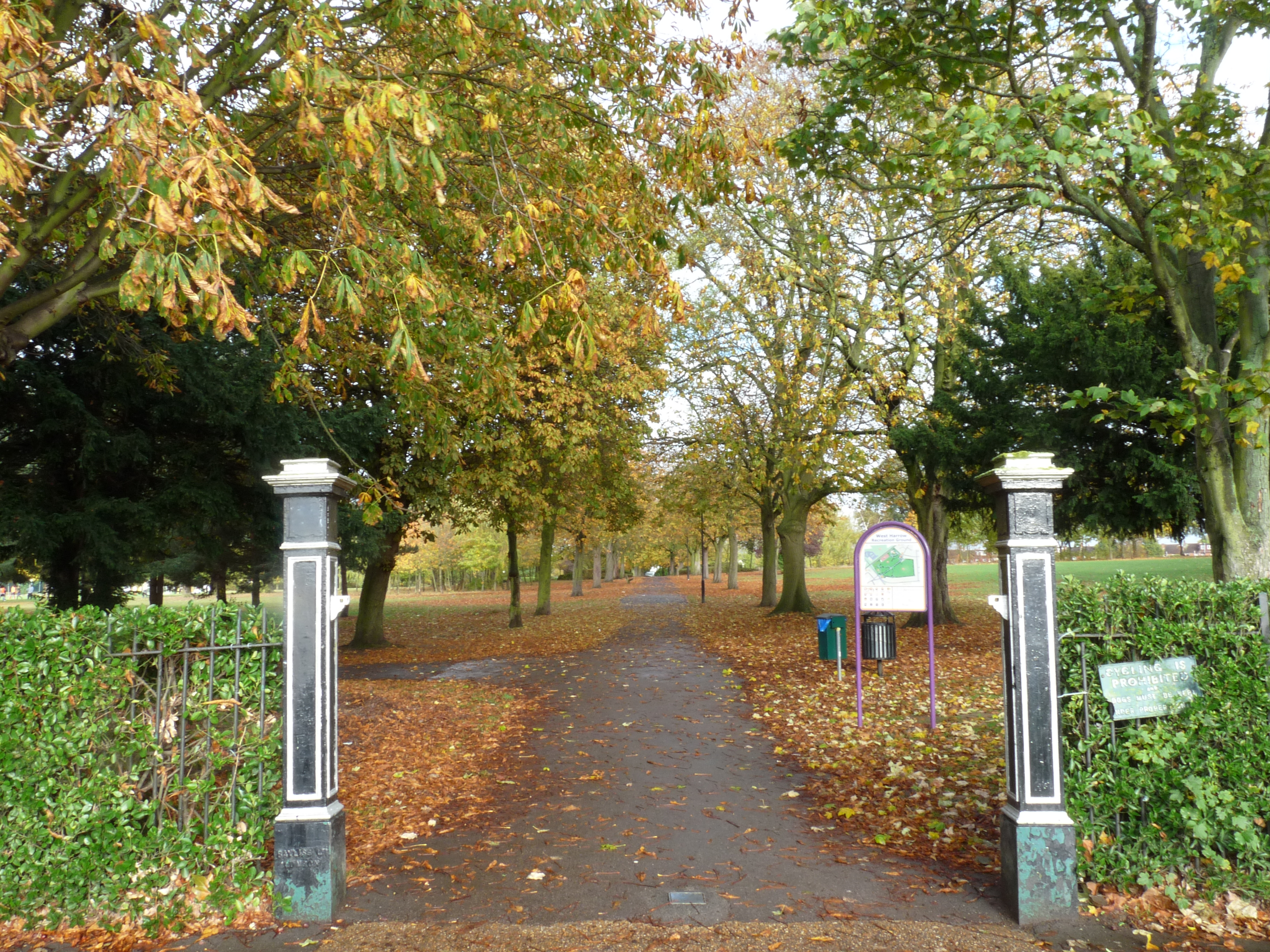
West Harrow Recreation Ground

=== Education ===
Vaughan Primary School and Grange Primary School provide primary education to the area while Whitmore High School (previously Lascelles Boys Secondary School and Lascelles Girls Secondary School) provides secondary education and sixth-form studies. In 2007, Harrow Council successfully bid for a £31.5 million redevelopment of Whitmore under the Building Schools for the Future programme. The new building opened in 2010 and a sixth form block was added in 2015.

=== Religion ===
The Anglican church of St Peter's, consecrated in 1913, serves the area. Falling attendance led to a temporary closure in 1982 before reopening in 1989. The building is considered of architectural interest and was Grade II listed in 1980.

The original site of the Shri Kutch Satsang Swaminarayan Temple was on Vaughan Road in West Harrow. It was established in 1976 but moved to a new location in Kenton in 1996, owing to the growing size of its congregation.

=== Sport and leisure ===
West Harrow Recreation Ground provides access to various sports facilities, including tennis and basketball courts. A bowling green has been located in the park since its inception in 1923 and is home to the West Harrow Bowling Club.

=== Arts ===
The Usurp Art Gallery and Studios, a charity, was opened in West Harrow in 2010 under the artistic direction of Poulomi Desai. It claimed to be the first and only artist-led space in Harrow, with Desai describing it as an "experiment to see whether something can even be positioned in that space in that geographical location". The gallery hosted workshops, exhibitions and other events for the community, with a stated emphasis on experimental media and engaging with autistic communities and bringing well known artists works to the area. In 2019, the lease on the gallery space was not renewed. The site of the former gallery is now occupied by oneforty, a private CIC multipurpose cafe venue.

== Transport ==
=== London Underground ===
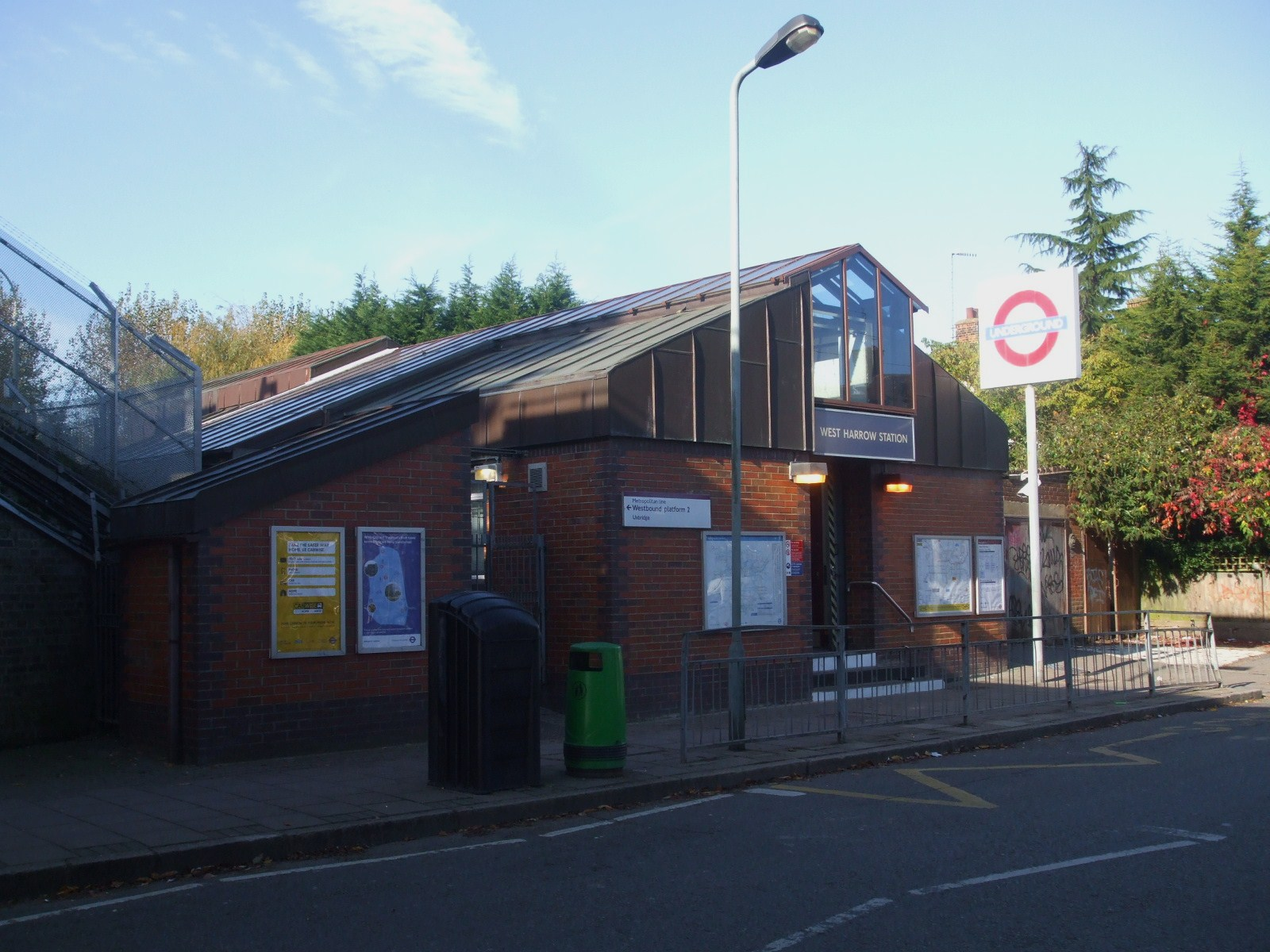
West Harrow Station on the Metropolitan line

West Harrow Station is on the Uxbridge branch of the Metropolitan line. Trains run northbound to Uxbridge via Rayners Lane and southbound into central London via Harrow-on-the-Hill.

=== Bus routes ===
Bus services do not serve the station directly. There are stops nearby on Pinner Road (A404) for the H19 and 183 routes, and on Treve Avenue for the H11, 140 and 114 routes. The 640 school service and the N140 night bus also stop on Treve Avenue.

== Notable people ==
- Roger Bannister, neurologist who ran the first sub-4-minute, mile lived at 77 Butler Road.
- Guy Barker, jazz trumpeter and composer, attended Lascelles Secondary Modern School.
- Poulomi Desai, photographer, multimedia artist and artistic director of Usurp Art Gallery and Studios.
- Rick Wakeman, keyboardist and composer best known as a member of the progressive rock band Yes owned a home in West Harrow in 1971.
- Alex Webb, songwriter and musician, is from West Harrow.
