= Shoulder Voices =

Studio album by Rollerskate Skinny
- Released: 1994
- Genre: Noise pop
- Label: Placebo; Beggars Banquet
- Producer: Ger Griffin, Stevie M., Jimi Shields

Rollerskate Skinny chronology
| Shoulder Voices (1994) | Horsedrawn Wishes (1996) |

Professional ratings
Review scores
| Source | Rating |
|---|---|
| AllMusic | 4.5/5 stars |
| The Encyclopedia of Popular Music | 3/5 stars |

Shoulder Voices is the debut album by Rollerskate Skinny, released in 1994. The album was named the Album of the Month in CMJ. It led to an appearance on the 1994 Lollapalooza tour and a recording contract with Sire Records.

== Critical reception ==
Trouser Press called the album "a fascinating and delightful debut that jumps easily from intimate indie tunefulness (the vocals sound like Pavement) to free-fire pop noise, with plenty of wild and wonderful textures along the continuum." Washington City Paper wrote: "Mixing the sonic textures of My Bloody Valentine with the rich melodies of Echo & the Bunnymen and angular, runaway rhythms, Voices' layered brilliance was maniacally complex, immediately catchy, and refreshingly innovative." The Times wrote that "for a generation of Irish music fans, the Dublin art-rock band Rollerskate Skinny's Shoulder Voices (1993) was as important as Nirvana's In Utero and Smashing Pumpkins' Siamese Dream.

== Track listing ==
1. "Miss Leader"
2. "Violence to Violence"
3. "Lúnasa"
4. "Bring on Stigmata"
5. "Bella"
6. "Ages"
7. "Bow Hitch-Hiker"
8. "Some Give Birth"
9. "Shallow Thunder"
10. "Slave"
11. "So Far Down Up to Heaven"

All tracks written by Rollerskate Skinny
