= Horsedrawn Wishes =

Studio album by Rollerskate Skinny
- Released: 26 February 1996
- Recorded: October 1994–March 1995 at STS Studios in Dublin, Ireland
- Genres: Rock, shoegaze, noise pop
- Length: 58:25
- Label: Warner Bros.
- Producers: Rollerskate Skinny, Aidan Foley

Rollerskate Skinny chronology
Shoulder Voices (1993)	Horsedrawn Wishes (1996)

Singles from Horsedrawn Wishes
- 1. "Speed to My Side" Released: 1996

Horsedrawn Wishes is the second and final studio album by the Irish indie rock band Rollerskate Skinny, released on 26 February 1996 on Warner Bros. Records. It was recorded at STS Studios in Dublin, Ireland, mixed at Parr Street Studios in Liverpool, United Kingdom and mastered at Metropolis Studios in London. "Speed to My Side" was released as a single in 1996. The album artwork was designed by Dublin designer Andy McCormack.

== Reception ==
Professional ratings
Review scores
Source	Rating
Allmusic	4.5/5 stars
Hot Press	positive
Magnet	positive

Since its original release, Horsedrawn Wishes has received positive critical acclaim. Allmusic rated the album four and a half out of five stars with reviewer Tim DiGravina summarising it as "an amazing 60 minutes of music that sounds like a stunning, warped genre onto itself." DiGravina drew comparisons between Horsedrawn Wishes and My Bloody Valentine's Loveless (1991), said that Horsedrawn Wishes "creates elegant sounds, masters walls of guitars (and walls of other instruments as well), and arranges its songs so the hooks have maximum impact" and referred to it is "one of the most original albums in rock and one of the best albums of the 1990s." Hot Press noted that the album "sounded like Ireland's answer to Mercury Rev and The Flaming Lips. Each track was a mini-symphony blending buzzing guitars, unusual harmonies, urgent keyboards and warped melodies" and called it "one of the most innovative sixty minutes of Irish rock music ever recorded." Magnet called Horsedrawn Wishes a "lost classic" and said it "contained meticulously constructed, extraordinarily druggy to-and-fro, with guitars of every shape and size poking through every available surface, its pacing a testament to a lysergic imagination."

== Legacy ==
Horsedrawn Wishes was listed at number 33 on Hot Press' "100 Greatest Irish Albums" list, where it had been previously listed at number 14 in 2004. The album was featured as one of the "Top 50 Irish Albums" in a poll conducted by Irish radio DJ Tom Dunne in December 2001.

Andrew Earles of Spin ranked Horsedrawn Wishes at #39 on the list Blame Nirvana: The 40 Weirdest Post-'Nevermind' Major-Label Albums, describing the album as "A maximalist, wildly overdriven noise-pop blasterpiece."

"Speed To My Side" was featured in the film Wild.

== Track listing ==
All tracks are written by Rollerskate Skinny.

No.	Title	Length
1.	"Swing Boat Yawning"	3:49
2.	"Cradle Burns"	4:50
3.	"One Thousand Couples"	5:08
4.	"Swab the Temples"	3:26
5.	"Speed to My Side"	6:53
6.	"All Mornings Break"	4:49
7.	"Man Under Glass"	4:32
8.	"Shimmer Son Like a Star"	4:02
9.	"Angela Starling"	4:42
10.	"Ribbon Fat"	6:13
11.	"Thirsty European"	5:01
12.	"Bell Jars Away"	4:59
Total length:		58:25

== Personnel ==
All personnel credits adapted from Horsedrawn Wishes's liner notes.

Rollerskate Skinny

- Ken Griffin – vocals, guitar, keyboards, orchestration
- Ger Griffin – guitar, keyboards, drum programming, orchestration
- Stephen Murray – bass, guitar, keyboards, orchestration

Guest musicians

- Clive Carroll – drums (2–10)
- Conor Murray – drums (1, 11, 12)
- Paul Cantwell – drums (9)

Technical personnel

- Rollerskate Skinny – production, mixing (1–4, 6, 8–10)
- Aidan Foley – production, engineering, mixing (5, 7, 11, 12)
- Anjali Dutt – mixing (1–4, 6, 8–10)
- Tony Cousins – mastering

Design personnel

- Power House Commercial Designs Dublin – design, photography
- Art Director: Andy McCormack from Power House (later Imagine Design) Dublin/Berlin based art director.
- Eamonn McLoughlin – front cover photography
- Andrew Flynn – back cover photography
