= Paik =

- Origin: Toledo, Ohio
- Genres: Post-rock, Space rock
- Instrument(s): Vocals, Guitars, Drums
- Years active: 1997–present
- Labels: Beyonder Records; Strange Attractors Audio House
- Website: Paik Space

Paik is a post-rock/space rock band, originally from Toledo, United States, currently living in Detroit, Michigan, United States, that includes Rob Smith and Ryan Pritts. Bassist Ali Clegg left the band in 2005, and has since been replaced by San Francisco native Anthony Petrovic (E-Zee-Tiger). Terms used when describing Paik's music include: post-rock, shoegaze, and space rock.

== Background ==
Formed in 1997, the band is erroneously thought to be named after veteran Korean artist Nam June Paik, but is actually named after an old-fashioned term for a swift punch to the gut. The band has toured in support of indie rockers Black Rebel Motorcycle Club as well as Stephen Malkmus and the Jicks. They have shared stages with Windy & Carl.

Since their release of Monster of the Absolute in 2006, Paik has never released a new album and was last said to be on hiatus.

Rob Smith primarily plays a Fender Jaguar as the lead instrument, which is largely responsible for the band's musical style, together with drummer Ryan Pritts's incorporation of a timpani in his drum set since Paik's third album, 2002's The Orson Fader.

== Discography ==
=== Albums ===
- Hugo Strange (Beyonder, 1998)
- Corridors (Beyonder, 2001)
- The Orson Fader (Clairecords, 2002)
- Crickets and Fireflies (split album with Kinski and Surface of Eceon (Music Fellowship, 2004)
- Satin Black (Strange Attractors Audio House, 2004)
- Monster of the Absolute (Strange Attractors Audio House, 2006)

=== Singles ===
- "Spacer" (Beyonder, 1999)

=== DVDs ===
- Magnesium Fire (Beyonder, 2006)
