= Wounded Knees =

Irish-American band

- Origin: Dublin, Ireland / Troy, New York
- Genres: Alternative rock, post-punk, noise pop
- Label: Specific Recordings
- Members: Jimi Shields; Suzanne Thorpe; Phil Williams

Wounded Knees is a band whose core members are Jimi Shields (formerly of Rollerskate Skinny and Lotus Crown), ex-Mercury Rev flautist Suzanne Thorpe, and Phil Williams (ex-Hopewell).

== History ==
Shields, based in Dublin, Ireland, and Thorpe, based in Troy, NY, started to collaborate years after their respective former bands had toured together in the 1990s. Thorpe says of her and Shields' decision to start the Wounded Knees, "He told me he was working on some material [and] it turned out that... our ears were at the same place, our emotional states were at the same place, and we were just locked into a similar path. We were feeling pretty empathetic toward each other”

The Wounded Knees released the All Rise EP on limited-edition 10" brown vinyl on Specific Recordings in 2008. All Rise was mixed by Kevin Shields and features guitar work by J Mascis on the song, "Dirty (a.k.a. Dirty Exploding Sonic Dogfight)".

In the fall of 2008, the Wounded Knees played a handful of tour dates supporting the newly reformed My Bloody Valentine. In December 2009, the band performed at the My Bloody Valentine-curated All Tomorrow's Parties festival 'A Nightmare Before Christmas'.
