= Good to Die Records =

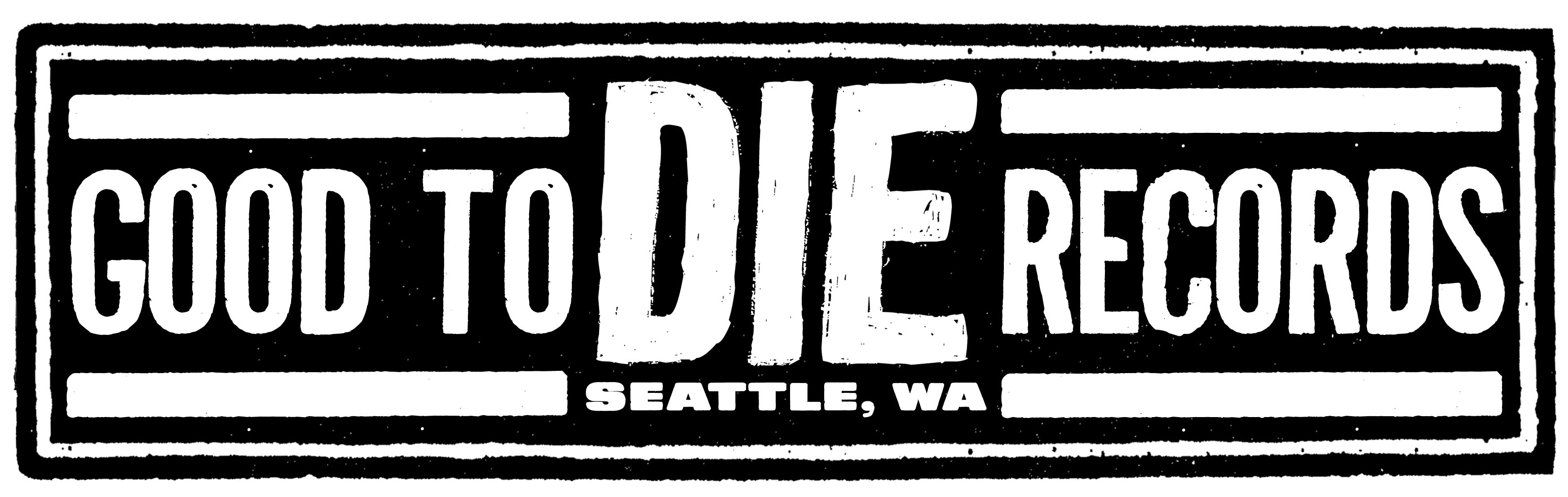
- Founded: 2011
- Distributor: Burnside Distribution Corporation
- Country of origin: U.S.
- Location: Seattle, Washington
- Official website: goodtodierecords.com

Good to Die is an independent record label based in Seattle, Washington. Good to Die is owned and operated by Nik Christofferson and is distributed by the Burnside Distribution Corporation in Portland, Oregon. Good to Die releases records from acts in the underground rock scene of the Pacific Northwest including Sandrider, Gaytheist, Rabbits, and Kinski.

== History ==
Good to Die was founded in June 2011. During the first year, the label released a number of albums, including those by Sandrider, Rabbits, Dog Shredder, Monogamy Party, Deadkill, Brokaw, Absolute Monarchs and Gaytheist.

In 2016, the label organized a five-year anniversary party, featuring many of the company's signed acts and a reunion of the Absolute Monarchs.

== Selected artists ==
- Absolute Monarchs
- Blood Drugs
- Brokaw
- Constant Lovers
- Deadkill
- Dog Shredder
- Gaytheist
- Kinski
- Maximum Mad
- Merso
- Monogamy Party
- Old Iron
- Rabbits
- Sandrider

== Release history ==
Artist	Title	Year	Catalog #	Format
Monogamy Party	Pus City	2011	GTD001	10" Vinyl / Digital
Sandrider	Sandrider	2011	GTD002	12" Vinyl / Digital
Brokaw	Interiors	2012	GTD003	10" Vinyl / CD / Digital
Dog Shredder	Brass Tactics	2012	GTD004	12" Vinyl / Digital
Absolute Monarchs	1	2012	GTD005	12" Vinyl / CD / Digital
Deadkill	7"	2012	GTD006	7" Vinyl / Digital
Gaytheist	Stealth Beats	2012	GTD007	12" Vinyl / Digital
Rabbits	Bites Rites	2012	GTD008	12" Vinyl / Cassette / Digital
Gaytheist	Hold Me...But Not So Tight	2013	GTD009	12" Vinyl / Digital
Monogamy Party	False Dancers	2013	GTD010	12" Vinyl / Digital
Sandrider	Godhead	2013	GTD011	12" Vinyl / Digital
Deadkill	No, Never!	2014	GTD012	12" Vinyl / Digital
Constant Lovers	Experience Feelings	2014	GTD013	12" Vinyl / Digital
Sandrider / Kinski	Sandrider + Kinski	2015	GTD014	12" Vinyl / Digital
Blood Drugs	Blood Drugs	2015	GTD015	12" Vinyl / Digital
Gaytheist / Rabbits	GAY*BITS	2015	GTD016	12" Vinyl / Digital
Merso	Red World	2016	GTD017	12" Double Vinyl / Digital
Gaytheist	Let's Jam Again Soon	2017	GTD018	12" Vinyl / Digital
Old Iron	Lupus Metallorum	2017	GTD019	12" Vinyl / Digital
Maximum Mad	Dear Enemy EP	2017	GTD020	Cassette / Digital
Sandrider	Armada	2018	GTD021	12" Vinyl / Digital
