= August Wells =

Musical project formed in New York

August Wells is a musical project formed in New York by Dublin native Kenneth Griffin (formerly of Rollerskate Skinny, Kid Silver and Favourite Sons) and New York pianist John Rauchenberger. Formed in late 2012 the band self-released their critically acclaimed debut album 'A Living & A Dying Game' on Blue Car Records.

In February 2015 the band signed with Irish Independent label ' Forever In Financial Arrears' (FIFA Records) whose roster has included The Frank and Walters, The Vincent(s), Elastic Sleep, whipping Boy and Fight Like Apes amongst others. Their first release on FIFA was the sumptuous single 'Here In the Wild' which was released in April 2015 and broke new ground for the band in Griffins home country of Ireland. August 2015 saw the band release the single 'Come On In Out Of That Night' again on FIFA and once again has the deep lilt of Griffin's voice combined with the sound of Rauchenbergers piano arrangements, add to that Louis Schwadron (Radio Head & Grizzly Bear) and Griffins uplifting brass arrangements which are accented by fat choruses contrasting with the deep twisted vocal. The result is an elegant three minutes of lustrous music. The release of the single also coincided with a much coveted appearance on the TV show Other Voices. 'Come On In Out of That Night' received high rotation on national radio in Ireland and saw August Wells profile continue to rise.

The band continued their relationship with FIFA Records with the release of a third single 'A Little Too Real' in Jan 2016 and the band embarked on an extensive Irish tour which included several sell out shows, the band also played their first shows in Germany in Feb 2016.

== Discography ==
=== Albums ===
- A Living & a Dying Game (2014) Blue Car Records

=== Singles & EP's ===
- Here In the Wild ( April 2015) FIFA Records
- Come On In Out of That Night ( August 2015) FIFA Records
- A Little Too Real (Jan 2016) FIFA Records
- She Was a Question (Jun 2016) FIFA Records
