= Larchmont Chronicle =

American monthly community newspaper

- Type: Monthly newspaper
- Format: Tabloid
- Owner: Hutcheson Publishing Group
- Editor: Hedy Hutcheson
- Founded: 1963
- Language: English
- Headquarters: 606 N. Larchmont Blvd., #103; Los Angeles, California 90004; United States
- Circulation: 76,439 readers monthly
- Price: Free or $25/yearly donation
- Website: larchmontchronicle.com

The Larchmont Chronicle is a monthly community newspaper serving Larchmont Village, Hancock Park, Windsor Square, Fremont Place, Park La Brea and Miracle Mile in Los Angeles, California, United States. It is independently owned.

== History ==
In 1963, Dawne P. Goodwin and Jane Gilman canvassed the Larchmont area in Los Angeles to start a community newspaper. The first issue of the Larchmont Chronicle was mailed to 10,000 families in the upper income areas of Hancock Park and Windsor Square. Both women secured 28 advertisers for the first 12-page issue. They each earned $250 on the first issue.

Goodwin retired in 1997, moved to Fallbrook, and died in October 2012. In April 2015, Gilman sold the paper to attorney John Welborne. Gilman remained a contributing editor until she officially retired a year later. In January 2025, Andrew and Hedy Hutcheson acquired the paper.

== Awards ==
The Larchmont Chronicle has been commended by many organizations for its support and promotion of their objectives. Non-profit agencies who have given awards include the American Red Cross, Wilshire Chamber of Commerce, Wilshire Community Police Council, the Los Angeles Conservancy, Windsor Square-Hancock Park Historical Society, City Councilman Tom LaBonge and the Miracle Mile Civic Coalition.

== Coverage ==
Hancock Park, Windsor Square, Fremont Place, Larchmont Village, Brookside, Windsor Village, Miracle Mile, Park La Brea, the Palazzo East and West and the Villas. It has an estimated readership of 76,439.

== Pricing ==
The Larchmont Chronicle is a free newspaper to the community it serves, but a yearly donation of $25 may be paid.
