= Seán Mac Erlaine =

- Born: 30 July 1976 (age 49); Dublin, Ireland
- Genres: Ambient experimental Jazz
- Occupation: Musician
- Instruments: Woodwinds, keyboards, live electronics
- Years active: 1999-present
- Website: www.seanmacerlaine.com

Seán Mac Erlaine (born 30 July 1976) is an Irish musician and composer specialising in woodwinds and electronics. He studied jazz performance in Newpark Music Centre under Ronan Guilfoyle where he also taught for a number of years before completing his formal education at Dublin Institute of Technology where he was awarded a Masters in Jazz Performance as well as a PhD focusing on solo woodwind performance with live electronics. He plays alto saxophone, clarinet and bass clarinet which he often processes through software created with Max/MSP. He has performed with leading musicians including Jan Bang, Bill Frisell, David Toop, Ernst Reijseger, The Smith Quartet, Hayden Chisholm, Eivind Aarset, Caoimhín Ó Raghallaigh, Ronan Guilfoyle, Iarla O'Lionaird, Valgeir Sigurðsson, Damo Suzuki and The Gloaming. Mac Erlaine has released two solo albums on Irish record label Ergodos. The Irish Times describes Mac Erlaine as "consistently one of the most interesting and adventurous musicians of his generation."

== Discography ==
- Seán Mac Erlaine: Long After The Music Is Gone (Ergodos, 2012)
- Martin Tourish: Under a Red Sky Night (MT Music, 2014)
- Dylan Tighe: Record (Independent, 2014)
- Ergodos Musicians: Songs (Ergodos, 2014)
- This is How we Fly: This is How we Fly (Playing With Music, 2014)
- Seán Mac Erlaine: A Slender Song (Ergodos, 2014)
- Quiet Music Ensemble: Mysteries Beyond Matter (Farpoint Recordings, 2015)
- Dylan Tighe: Wabi-Sabi Soul (Independent, 2016)
- Benedict Schlepper-Connolly: The Weathered Stone (Ergodos, 2016)
- Davy Kehoe: Short Passing Game (Wah Wah Wino, 2017)
- This is How we Fly: Foreign Fields (Playing With Music, 2017)
- Seán Mac Erlaine: Music for Empty Ears (Ergodos, 2018)
- Achim Zepezauer + guests: Slotmachinene (Gruenrekorder, 2019)
- INNI-K: The Hare & The Line (Independent, 2019)
- Ordnance Survey: Relative Phase (Scintilla Recordings, 2019)
