= Stanisław Dróżdż =

Polish poet (1939–2009)

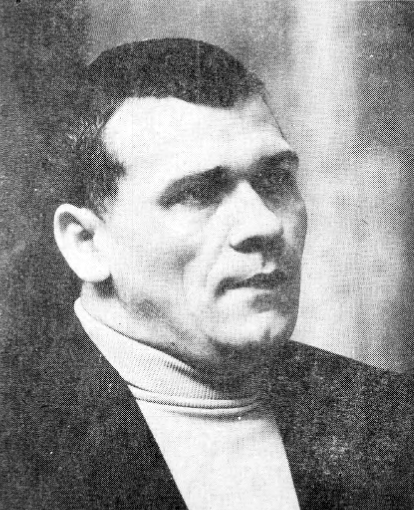
Stanisław Dróżdż in 1971

Stanisław Dróżdż (1939 – 29 March 2009) was a Polish artist. He is a representative of concrete poetry, and a pioneer of this movement in Polish art.

== Biography ==
Dróżdż was born in 1939 in Sławków, Poland. He graduated from the University of Wrocław with a diploma from the Faculty of Polish philology. While the writers' union did not accept him with the degree in Polish, Dróżdż became a member of the artists association (although all other members associated with the visual arts)

Dróżdż’s visual poems follow the experimentation of the avant-garde, comprising a language, signs and images. He developed his work into artistic forms arranged them in two- or three-dimensional spaces, keeping in mind that "Traditional poetry describes an image. Concrete poetry writes in images.". This process resulted in concrete poems such as his most famous Between [Między] in 1977 in Galerry Foksal in Warsaw. In this work the walls of a white cube were covered with rows of black letters forming the word: between.

The concrete poem is an artistic genre which illustrates poems in the shape of visual compositions which are formed with arrangements of letters and typographic signs that do not follow any semantic or syntactic relations. Dróżdż himself so characterizes the discipline as a practice that. Other concrete things taken from the world of objects were also used in Dróżdż's work. His projects, besides letters and numbers, included watches, doorknobs, checkers, chess and dice. There were also geometric figures, peculiar charts and logic games in order to mixed up textual and mathematical orders. Therefore, by combining the experiments of many fields, Dróżdż became one of the leaders in many aspects of the art of the second half of 20th and early 21st century.

In 2003 he represented Poland during 50th Venice Biennale with his work "ALEA IACTA EST"- Curated by Paweł Sosnowski (owner of Propaganda Gallery). The title of the work is based on Julius Caesar's famous phrase, "Alea iacta est". In this work Dróżdż proposes a game, as games are archetypical of conflict, but the conflict here is increased by the desire to win.

Dróżdż has had about 300 both individual and group exhibitions in Poland and abroad since 1968. Dróżdż's works belong to the collections of national and international museums.

He died on 29 March 2009 in Wrocław, Poland.

"..concrete poetry consists in isolating the word, making it autonomous. In isolating it from the linguistic context, as well as from the context of the non-linguistic reality, so as to make the word signify in itself and unto itself. In concrete poetry form is determined by content, and content by form. Traditional poetry describes an image. Concrete poetry writes with it."
