= Favourite Sons =

American indie rock band

The Favourite Sons is an indie rock band from Brooklyn, made up of Ken Griffin (former member of Rollerskate Skinny) and four members of Jagjaguwar's Aspera. They have released one full-length album, Down Beside Your Beauty (2006), which was mixed by Victor Van Vugt (P.J. Harvey, The Fall, The Pogues).

The four other Sons (guitarist/keyboard player Justin Tripp, guitarist Carmine Degennaro, bass guitarist Matt Werth, and drummer A.J. Edmiston) were formerly part of the band Aspera before relocating to New York in 2004 after parting ways with their singer.

Werth and Tripp tracked down Griffin in the summer of 2004. Gold Standard Laboratories offered to put out a 7" single in early 2005. Shortly thereafter, the Sons were approached by James Oldham (head of the UK independent Loog Records) to release a four-song single in Europe entitled the Treason EP. With less than ten official shows under their belts, the Sons headed off to Europe to tour in support of Treason.

On their return to New York, Vice Recordings, who had expressed interest from the earliest demos, offered the band a long-term deal. The Sons recorded Down Beside Your Beauty in Brooklyn in January, with Victor Van Vugt coming in as mixer the following month. In 2006, they toured with The Drones and Devastations, but pulled out of the tour due to illness. In 2007, they undertook a national US tour with Au Revoir Simone and Voxtrot. The band have recently completed work upon a new album. entitled "The Great Deal of Love" which has been released on Low Rent Records.

The whole back catalog of Kenneth Griffin's work Rollerskate Skinny including the unreleased material along with Kid Silver, Favourite Sons and August Wells will be released next year on Captcha Records.
