= Krzysztof Bartnicki =

Polish translator

Krzysztof Bartnicki (born 1971) is a Polish translator, writer, musician/composer, lexicographer and Joyce scholar. His translations into English include poetry of Stanisław Dróżdż and Bolesław Leśmian. He is the author of several Polish-English dictionaries.

== Translator ==
Bartnicki's Finneganów tren (2012) is world's 7th complete translation of James Joyce's Finnegans Wake. The translation, completed 1999–2012, won various awards, including the Literatura na Świecie Award (2012).

Bartnicki also translated Finnegans Wake into a rotary business card holder (Finnegans Meet, with Marcin Szmandra, 2015) and into a musical cryptogram (Da Capo al Finne, 2012).

His intersemiotic translations of Joyce have been discussed in Ireland, Italy, Poland, UK, USA etc.

== Composer ==
In the musical output derived from the text of Finnegans Wake, Bartnicki's first publicly performed composition was A Redivivus of Paganinism: Variations on a Text by Joyce upon Lutosławski's Variations on a Theme by Paganini (Częstochowa, The Lutosławski Year celebrations, 2013), the most frequently recurring, however, were his imitations of John Williams's themes for Star Wars.

== Bibliography ==
=== Original work ===
- (2010) Prospekt emisyjny (Prospectus); listed for Paszport Polityki Award
- (2012) Fu wojny (Fu of War); applying the ancient art of war to literary translation
- (2015) Macleid (in English)
- (2021) Myśliwice, Myśliwice; awarded Gdynia Literary Prize for Best Polish Prose

=== Translations ===
- (2012) Finneganów tren., ha!art, Kraków [literary translation of Finnegans Wake]
- (2012) Da Capo al Finne, Sowa, Warszawa [musical translation of Finnegans Wake]
- (2015) Finnegans Meet, Opole/Tychy [verbovisual translation of Finnegans Wake, with Marcin Szmandra]
- (2016) Inwards Beyond the Words Between, Wrocław [English translation of Stanisław Dróżdż poetry]
- (2023) Garutko sobotniej ropy [music remake of Jan Kochanowski poetry]
- (2024) Port hwjezdny Topjo [translation of Deep Wheel Orcadia by Harry Josephine Giles]
