= Gerry Smyth =

Irish academic and musician

Gerry Smyth (born 14 September 1961) is an academic, musician, actor and playwright born in Dublin, Ireland. He works in the Department of English at Liverpool John Moores University, where he is Professor of Irish Cultural History. His early publications were mainly in the field of Irish literature, although since 2002 he has also written widely on the subject of Irish music.

== Profile ==
Smyth was an early advocate of postcolonial criticism in Irish Studies, although more recently he has been keen to emphasise the autobiographical dimension of critical discourse.

Smyth has lectured throughout Europe and the United States on various aspects of Irish culture; most recently he was a keynote speaker at IASIL 2017, held in Singapore. In September/October 2006 he was Academic-in-Residence at the Princess Grace Irish Library in Monaco. He was appointed Visiting Professor of Irish Studies at the University of Vienna between October 2010 and February 2011.

Of his books, Decolonisation and Criticism won the American Conference for Irish Studies' Michael J. Durkan Prize for best book published in literary criticism, arts criticism or cultural studies in 1999. Beautiful Day: Forty Years of Irish Rock (co-authored with Sean Campbell) was published in 2005 and Our House: The Representation of Domestic Space in Contemporary Culture (co-edited with Jo Croft) in 2006. His collection of critical essays, Music in Irish Cultural History, also won the Michael J. Durkan Prize (2009). In 2016, Smyth published Celtic Tiger Blues: Music and Modern Irish Identity (Routledge, 2016), which included analyses of work by James Joyce, the Pogues, Bernard MacLaverty, The Waterboys, Tim Robinson, and Augusta Holmès. The year 2020 saw the publication of Joyces Noyces: Music and Sound in the Life and Literature of James Joyce (Manchester University Press). In January 2021, Smyth (under the name of McGowan) released a co-edited volume (with Andrew Sherlock) entitled The Lost Letters of Flann O'Brien, a collection of 107 imaginary letters written to O'Brien by a range of contemporary figures including Roddy Doyle, John Banville, Anne Enright, Paul Muldoon, Frank Cottrell Boyce, and many more. In February 2021, the British Library released Smyth's Sailor Song: The Shanties and Ballads of the High Seas with illustrations by the Scottish artist Jonny Hannah.

== Major publications ==
- The Novel and the Nation: Studies in the New Irish Fiction (London: Pluto Press, 1997)
- Decolonisation and Criticism: The Construction of Irish Literature (London: Pluto Press, 1998)
- Explorations in Cultural History (with T.G. Ashplant) (London: Pluto Press, 2000)
- Space and the Irish Cultural Imagination (Basingstoke and New York: Palgrave, 2001)
- Across the Margins: Cultural Identity and Change in the Atlantic Archipelago (co-edited with Glenda Norquay) (Manchester: Manchester University Press, 2002)
- (ed.) Music in Contemporary Ireland: A Special Edition of the Irish Studies Review 12.1 (April 2004)
- Noisy Island: A Short History of Irish Popular Music (Cork: Cork University Press, 2005)
- Beautiful Day: Forty Years of Irish Rock (with Sean Campbell) (Cork: Atrium Press, 2005)
- Our House: The Representation of Domestic Space in Contemporary Culture (co-edited with Jo Croft) (Amsterdam: Rodopi, 2006)
- Music in Contemporary British Fiction: Listening to the Novel (Basingstoke: Palgrave Macmillan 2008)
- Music in Irish Cultural History (Dublin and London: Irish Academic Press, 2009)
- The Judas Kiss: Treason and Betrayal in Six Modern Irish Novels (Manchester: Manchester University Press, 2015)
- Celtic Tiger Blues: Music and Modern Irish Identity (London: Routledge, 2016)
- Joyces Noyces: Music and Sound in the Life and Literature of James Joyce (New York: Palgrave Macmillan, 2020)
- The Lost Letters of Flann O'Brien (co-edited with Andrew Sherlock) (Wirral: PenandPencil Gallery Press, 2021)

== Theatre ==
Smyth is a founder member of the Liverpool-Irish Literary Theatre, specialising in the writing and production of plays on Irish literary themes. In 2011 Smyth wrote a two-man show entitled The Brother which he adapted from the work of Flann O'Brien. He performed the play (with actor David Llewellyn, directed by Andrew Sherlock) at an international Flann O'Brien conference in Vienna in July 2011, and at another international conference in Trieste in May 2012. The Brother had a six-night run at the Edinburgh Free Fringe Festival in August 2012, and has subsequently been performed at the Eleanor Rathbone Theatre (the University of Liverpool), as part of the 2012 May Festival at the University of Aberdeen, and at the International Association for the Study of Irish Literature Conference in Lille in June 2014. Smyth wrote a companion piece entitled Will the Real Flann O'Brien ...? A Life in Five Scenes which he performed (in a doubleheader with The Brother) at the 2013 Liverpool Irish Festival, and at the Third Flann O'Brien Conference in Prague in July 2015. The Liverpool Irish Literary Theatre travelled to the O'Brien conference Salzburg in July 2017 to perform a trio of short plays, including two by Flann O'Brien - Thirst and The Dead Spit of Kelly - as well as The Golden Gate by Lord Dunsany. The company also performed at the Flann O'Brien Conference in Dublin in July 2019.

The Liverpool-Irish Literary Theatre is currently developing a piece entitled A Drink with Brendan Behan, based on the life (and death) of that famous Irish writer.

In August 2017 Smyth's play Nora & Jim - based on an episode in the lives of James Joyce and Nora Barnacle - ran for six nights at the Edinburgh Festival Fringe.

=== Murder Ballads ===
In October 2018, Smyth’s cabaret adaptation of the album Murder Ballads by Nick Cave and the Bad Seeds premiered at the Liverpool Royal Court. The show played to excellent reviews over three nights. It returned to the Royal Court in May 2019, before shows in London (the Other Palace, June), Manchester (Sale Waterside Arts Centre, October 31) and Sheffield (Theatre Deli, November 1), plus a twelve-night run at the Edinburgh Festival Fringe in August.

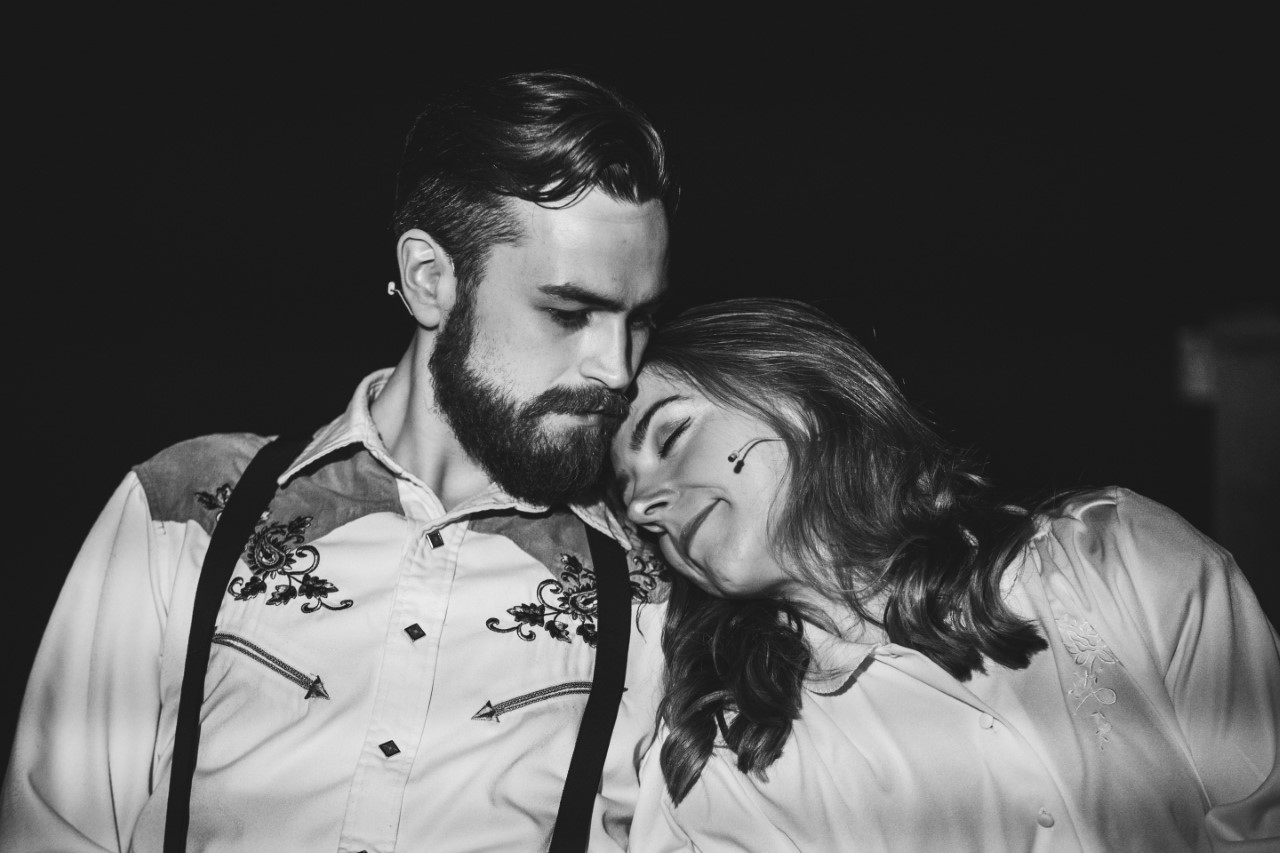
Thomas Galashan as Richard Slade and Laura Connolly as Mary Bellows in Murder Ballads at Liverpool's Royal Court, October 2018

== Music ==
Under the name Gerry McGowan, Smyth has released a number of albums of progressive folk music: The Colour Tree (2003), riverrun (2005), and The Usual Story (2008). He has also recorded and released three albums of Liverpool-related shanties: Roll & Go: Songs of Liverpool and the Sea (2009); Across the Western Ocean (2011) - this being a compilation of songs by various musicians from Merseyside performing shanties and ballads associated with Liverpool in aid of the Royal National Lifeboat Institute station in Hoylake, Merseyside; and Sailor Song (2017, with Wallasey-based folk group Reckless Elbow. He now runs the LJMU shanty choir, The Full Shanty, who have performed at the Liverpool River Festival and at the Launch of the LJMU Institute for Literary and Cultural History at Tate Liverpool on the city's Albert Dock.

In 2012, Smyth recorded and released an album entitled James Joyce's Chamber Music: this was a folk musical version (co-written and performed with his daughter Esther) of the thirty-six lyric suite published by James Joyce in 1907. The album was launched at a concert in the Bluecoat Arts Centre in Liverpool in October 2012 as part of the Liverpool Irish Festival. In 2013 and 2014, Smyth performed concerts of selected material from this album at concerts in Nijmegen, Brussels, Kortrijk, Paris, Rennes, Reykjavík, Trieste, Kristiansand, Gothenburg, Sassari, and Florence. A website based on the album was launched at an event in the Everyman Theatre in Liverpool on 22 January 2015. Material from the album has been performed at Joyce events in Istanbul and San Francisco.

In July 2019, Smyth released Words for Music, Perhaps: Fifteen Songs Adapted from the Poetry of W.B. Yeats. Once again featuring Esther Smyth on vocals, the album included settings of Yeats' poems such as 'Brown Penny', 'September 1913' and 'Come Gather Round Me, Parnellites' as well as new versions of 'The Fiddler of Dooney' and 'Down by the Salley Gardens'. The album was launched at an event in the Liverpool Arts Bar in December 2019.
