= Owen Tromans =

British singer-songwriter

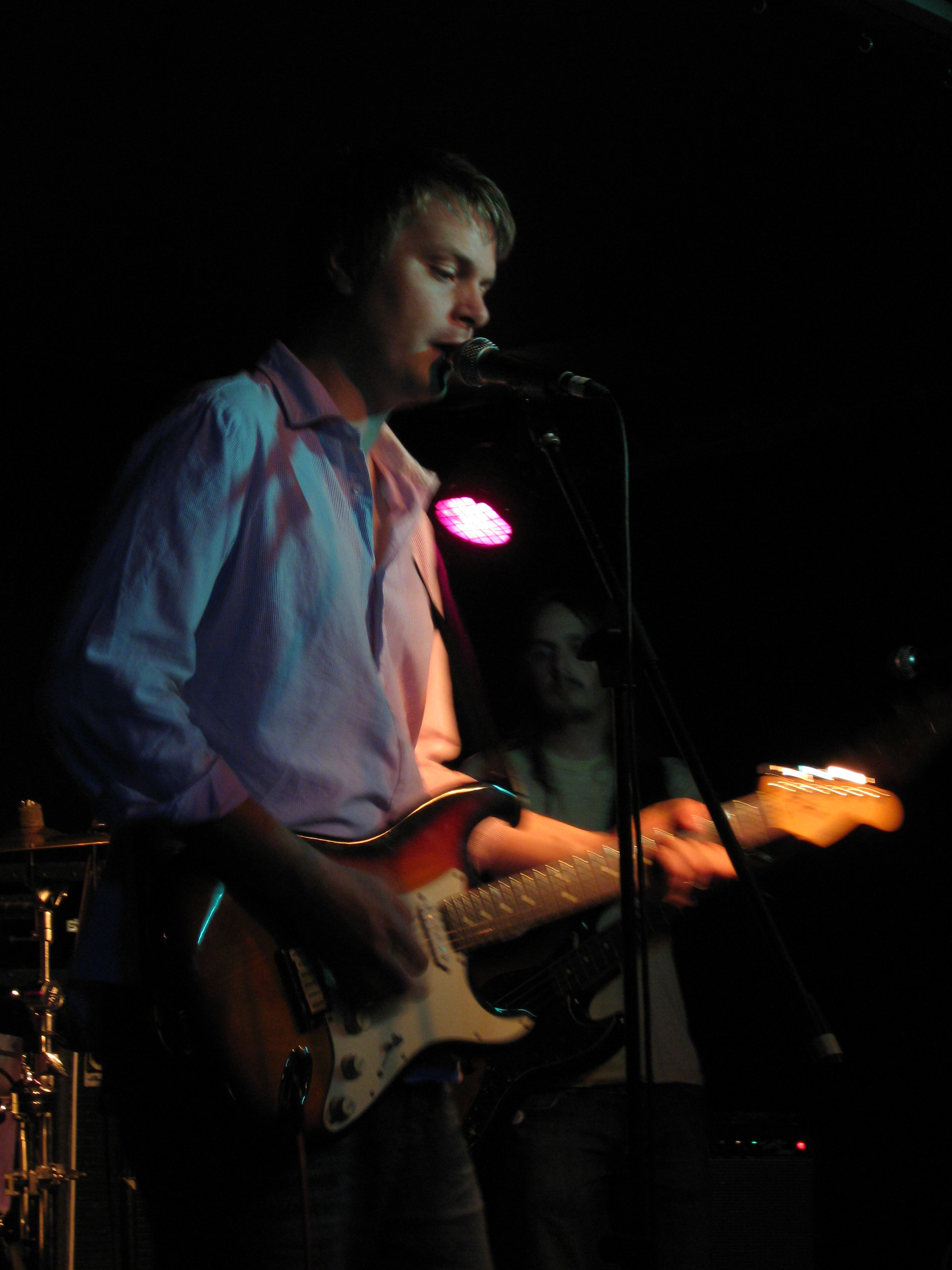

Background information
- Born: Owen Tromans; West Midlands, England
- Occupation: Singer-songwriter
- Instruments: Vocals, guitar
- Years active: 1996–present

Owen Tromans is a British musician and writer. He played with the group San Lorenzo and now records under his own name. Tromans has recorded several albums and EPs since 2001. He is the co-founder of the Weird Walk project.

Tromans played in the improv guitar duo Delphic Vapours with author and musician Seb Hunter, and has collaborated with Savaging Spires to release music under the name Candles.

== Discography ==
- Box of Tapes (Sacred Geometry, 2001)
- From a Lost Library (Sacred Geometry, 2003)
- Place (Bearos, 2004)
- Hope Is a Magnet (Sacred Geometry, 2008)
- The Fall of Acre (Sacred Geometry, 2009)
- Eternal Western Youthdream: 2001–2011 (Critical Heights, 2011)
- Golden Margins (Sacred Geometry, 2014)
- Between Stones (Sacred Geometry, 2019)

Tromans contributed to an album of James Joyce poetry set to music entitled Chamber Music which was released on Fire Records in 2008.

He contributed to the sixth issue of Esopus Magazine's CD Series.

In April 2011, Tromans released a split single with Wooden Wand on the English label Critical Heights.
