= Little Sparta (band) =

Little Sparta is a British band which was formed in the early 2000s by Alan D. Boyd and named after the garden of the artist Ian Hamilton Finlay. Over a number of years the band has changed personnel as their sound has developed. The current line-up is Alan D. Boyd on guitar, Scott Skinner on drums and Susie Honeyman on violin. Their first recordings were released on Fire Records and were collaborations with Scottish poet Gerry Mitchell. Many of these recordings received critical acclaim from the likes of Pitchfork and Drowned in Sound. Later recordings have been released on the Grey Gallery label, started by Susie Honeyman.

Little Sparta has performed their own score live to Lotte Reiniger's 1926 film The Adventures of Prince Achmed at the Edinburgh Festival and Latitude Festival and written music to accompany Allan Pollok-Morris's photographic exhibition Close: A Journey in Scotland, which toured the Chicago Botanic Garden and the United States Botanic Garden in Washington in 2011, and the New York Botanical Garden in 2012.

Little Sparta collaborated with Sally Timms and released the Lost Boat Party EP on 29 July 2020 on Grey Gallery Records.

== Selected discography ==
Little Sparta & Gerry Mitchell

- Scalpel Slice, CD, Fire Records, 2006
- Feasting on my heart: Keep Mother 5, 10” Vinyl, Fire Records, 2006
- The Ragged Garden, CD, Fire Records, 2007
- Little Sparta and Sally Timms, CD, Grey Gallery Records, 2009

Little Sparta

- The Adventures of Prince Achmed, 2010
- Close: Music for an exhibition, Grey Gallery Records, 2012
- Lost Boat Party (featuring Sally Timms), Grey Gallery Records, 2020
- You Cut Me (Single), Carnero Records, 2022
- Remembrance Day (Single), Carnero/Grey Gallery Records, 2023
