= Whip (musician) =

- Birth name: Jason Merritt
- Origin: Brooklyn, New York, United States
- Genres: Folk, alternative folk, singer-songwriter
- Years active: 1998–present
- Labels: Zeal; Tin Drum; Resonant; Priàpus; Blackbean and Placenta; O Rosa
- Website: www.timesbold.net/whip

Whip is an alias for American folk musician Jason Merritt who lives in Portland, Oregon. He is a full-time member of Timesbold, as well as writing solo records under the "Whip" pseudonym. Merritt was born in upstate New York, and lived in Brooklyn where he wrote four Whip records before forming Timesbold. Whip and Timesbold records are now both regularly released. Merritt moved to Portland in the Autumn of 2004.

== Discography ==
- Some Awful Men (Priàpus Records 7" single 1998)
- Song Song (Priàpus Records CD 2000)
- Timesbold (Blackbean and Placenta CD EP 2000)
- Sewn in Seems (Zeal Records 7" single 2001)
- Atheist Lovesongs To God (Zeal Records CD 2003, Tin Drum download 2005, Resonant Records CD 2005)
- First Songs (self released tour only CD-R 2004)
- R. Mutt's Blues (O Rosa Records CD EP 2007)
- Blues For Losers (Zeal Records CD 2007)
- Make Them Sirens Sing (Tin Drum / Zeal Records CD EP 2009)
