= Rollerskate Skinny =

Irish band

- Origin: Dublin, Ireland
- Genres: Indie rock • dream pop • noise pop • neo psychedelia
- Years active: 1992–1996
- Labels: Showbiz, Placebo, WEA
- Past members: Ken Griffin; Ger Griffin; Jimi Shields; Steve Murray

Rollerskate Skinny were an Irish band formed in 1992 by singer and guitarist Ken Griffin, guitarist Ger Griffin and bassist Stephen Murray, and were later joined by Jimmy Shields. They released two critically acclaimed albums, Shoulder Voices (1993) and Horsedrawn Wishes (1996).

== History ==
Ken Griffin, Ger Griffin (no relation) and Steve Murray had been in The Hippyshakes in the 1980s. Later the band became "Shake" and was characterized by a strawberry logo. In 1991, Jimi Shields (younger brother of My Bloody Valentine's Kevin Shields) joined the band and suggested a name change to Rollerskate Skinny, chosen from a line in The Catcher in the Rye, by J. D. Salinger: "She's quite skinny, like me, but nice skinny, rollerskate skinny."

The band relocated to London and released their debut EP Novice in September 1992. They were named in the NME's "Top Ten New Bands of the Year" in 1992. They were signed to Beggars Banquet offshoot label Placebo, who released their Trophy EP in April 1993: awarded single of the week in the NME. The following month, the band recorded a session for John Peel's BBC Radio 1 show, and their debut album Shoulder Voices (awarded CMJ Magazine's album of the month), was released in October that year. Another EP, Threshold, was issued in early 1994. The band toured with bands such as Mercury Rev, Smashing Pumpkins, Mazzy Star, Hole and Pavement. They were also invited by Perry Farrell to join the 1994 Lollapalooza tour. The increased media coverage as a result of the tour saw the band sign a major-label deal with WEA.

Shields was asked to leave the band and moved to Chicago. The band's first release on WEA was their second album, 1996's Horse Drawn Wishes. This was followed by the "Speed to My Side" single, but the band split up before any further releases.

== Legacy ==
All of the members of Rollerskate Skinny have gone on to other musical projects. Ken Griffin moved to New York City and formed the band Kid Silver, releasing the album Dead City Sunbeams in 1999. In 2004 Ken, along with former members of Philadelphia band Aspera, formed Favourite Sons who signed to Vice Records. Ken's latest project is the New York-based band August Wells Since the demise of Rollerskate Skinny, Ger and Steve worked on the project Walker. Steve since started the band Empire, now known as The Radio, which released its debut album in 2005. Jimi Shields went on to form Lotus Crown, and then later Wounded Knees with Suzanne Thorpe, formerly of Mercury Rev.

Ger Griffin begun recording again under the name Super Electric, and in a 2011 interview admitted that there is a third, unreleased Rollerskate Skinny album that may yet see the light of day, and stated that although the members have all put their past differences behind them and remain friends, that a reunion isn't in the cards. This 'third album' eventually saw the light of day in 2019 via a post on the Facebook group 'Rollerskate Skinny Are Criminally Underrated', (with the blessing of the band members) . Group member Ken Griffin gave the eight songs their titles and entitled the album 'Throwing Stars'.

Rollerskate Skinny remains influential on the Irish music scene. In 2004, Hot Press magazine readers voted Horsedrawn Wishes No. 14 on a list of the 100 greatest Irish albums, and The Irish Times named it No. 7 in a similar list in 2008 (with My Bloody Valentine's Loveless taking the No. 1 spot).

== Members ==
Last line-up

- Ken Griffin – lead vocals, guitars, keyboards
- Ger Griffin – guitars, keyboards, drum programming, backing vocals
- Steve Murray – bass, guitars, keyboards

Former members

- Jimi Shields – drums, percussion, guitars, keyboards, backing vocals
- Kevin Bass – drums

Touring and session members

- Max Corradi – drums
- Clive Caroll – drums

== Discography ==
=== Albums ===
- Shoulder Voices (1993, Placebo)
- Horsedrawn Wishes (1996, WEA)

=== Singles and EPs ===
- Novice 10" (1992, Showbiz)
- Trophy 10" (1993, Placebo)
- Threshold 10" (1994, Placebo)
- Speed to My Side 10"/CD (1996, WEA)
