= Butterfly Child =

- Origin: Belfast, Northern Ireland
- Genres: Indie Pop
- Years active: 1984—2021
- Past members: Joe Cassidy (deceased); Andrew "Pendle" Poucher; Richie Thomas; James Harris; Michael Paisley; Willy Sharpe; Tony McKeown; Merritt Lear

Butterfly Child was a Northern Irish group led by the singer/songwriter Joe Cassidy, based in Chicago, Illinois. Described as "purveyors of shimmering, oceanic rock", the band has released three full-length albums and numerous singles/EPs.

== History ==
Butterfly Child was formed in Belfast, Northern Ireland in 1984.

After playing shows throughout Ireland, Butterfly Child released an EP, Tooth Fairy, on A.R. Kane's H.ark! label in 1991. Remarkable in its "frazzled, cracked fragility", the EP caught the ear of the legendary BBC DJ John Peel, who invited the band to record its first Peel Session on 12 January 1992 at Maida Vale Studios. A second EP, Eucalyptus, was released the same year.

The band signed to Rough Trade Records in 1993 where it released the Ghetto Speak EP and the first full-length album, Onomatopoeia. In November 1993, Butterfly Child returned to Maida Vale for a second Peel Session. Broadcast in January 1994, the session included two songs that later appeared on the second album.

Work began on The Honeymoon Suite in summer 1994 with the intention to release it that autumn, but its release was delayed because of disagreements with the record company over the running order and content. After protracted discussions, it was finally released as originally intended by Dedicated Records in 1995.

Frustrated by the experience, Cassidy moved to Chicago in 1997 to begin work on a third album. Soft Explosives was released in late 1998 by HitIt! Recordings, a Chicago label that had handled the US releases of the first two albums.

Following a lengthy break, Butterfly Child released "No Longer Living In Your Shadow" as a 7" single on Dell'Orso Records in 2012.

On 15 July 2021, Cassidy died of heart problems and sepsis after falling ill earlier in the month. He was 51.

== Discography ==
Albums
Title	Format	Label	Year
Onomatopoeia	LP/CD	Rough Trade Records	1993
The Honeymoon Suite	CD/cassette	Dedicated Records	1995
Soft Explosives	CD	HitIt!	1998
Futures	LP/CD	Dell'Orso	2015

Singles/EPs
Title	Format	Label	Year
Tooth Fairy EP	12"	H.ark!	1991
Eucalyptus EP	12"/CD	H.ark!	1992
Juice	7"	Rough Trade Records	1992
Ghetto Speak EP	12"/CD	Rough Trade Records	1993
Beaujolais EP	10"/CD	Dedicated Records	1994
Flaming Burlesque	10"/CD	Dedicated	1995
No Longer Living In Your Shadow	7"	Dell'Orso	2012
