= Poulomi Desai =

British artist

Poulomi Desai is a British photographer, multi-media artist, curator and an activist community worker. A self-taught outsider artist originally inspired by a street theatre background, her works are performative, textual, image based, and acoustic - both digital and analog. She works with collaborative working processes which evolve through research, learning and action to examine the elusive, creating live and online large scale photographs, performances and outdoor sound installations.

== Life ==
Poulomi was born in Hackney, in 1965, but was moved to Harrow aged eight, with her mother who was a single parent, because of domestic abuse. At the age of thirteen, she co-founded Hounslow Arts Cooperative Theatre with Hardial Rai, looking for new connections as Harrow was a hot bed of racist organisations in the 1970s. She left school at fifteen influenced by a punk DIY spirit getting involved with Anti Fascist groups such as AFA and was involved in the Anti-Apartheid Movement. Poulomi was a senior Race Equality Officer - Campaigns officer in the Race Equality Unit at the London Borough of Ealing from 1986 to 1990. She co-founded the first South Asian LGBTTQ campaigning organisation, Shakti, in 1987 and also co-founded the first HIV / AIDs charity in India, the Naz Foundation International in 1991 with Shivananda Khan. From 1994 to 1996 she was a resident performer at the Watermans Arts Centre, with the regular 'One Nation under a Groove' comedy nights. Desai was an actor and part of the workshop group, that created Parv Bancil's satirical farce Papa Was a Bus Conductor, and toured with The Dead Jalebis, a spoof rock band, and the Sycophantic Sponge Bunch, a comedy trio.

Being interested in acoustics and spatial echoes from an early age, In 2000 she was commissioned by Moti Roti Arts, to create a multi channel sound installation for the Mead Gallery, which led to many sound art commissions. Poulomi was a creative curator for 'Open', a showcase of digital art by young people funded by the Arts Council of England. Commissions and exhibitions include The Serpentine Gallery, London, The Science Museum, London, The Queens Museum, New York, The Oxford Gallery, Kolkatta, and The Photographers Gallery, London. In 2010, Poulomi set up an arts hub - the Usurp Art Gallery and Studios, the first and only artist-led creative space and studios in the London Borough of Harrow., The gallery featured internationally renowned artists for the first time in Harrow, such as Mona Hatoum, Chila Burman, Rinpa Eshidan and a host of international and local artists and musicians together, something that had never been done before in Harrow. Poulomi curated the first retrospective of the influential artist, Chila Burman, covering works created over 40 years, many that had not seen before. Working closely with Chila Burman, who was commissioned by The Tate Britain in 2020, new workshops were created and it could be said that it also helped to led to new commissions for the artist. Poulomi was commissioned by the Google Cultural Institute and Sound and Music in 2015 to curate an exhibition for International Women's Day. In 2017, she curated We are the Lions, the first comprehensive exhibition on the 1978-78 Grunwick strike.

Desai is a Leverhulme Research Fellow at Heritage Quay Archives and the British Music Collection. Poulomi's work has been featured in Creative Camera, Dazed and Confused, the British Journal of Photography, The Guardian, and the New York Times.

== Works ==
- Red threads: the South Asian queer connection in photographs. London: Millivres Prowler, 2003.
- Out of Place. Raw Nerve Books
- Different. Phaidon.
