= Hayden Chisholm =

New Zealand musician (born 1975)

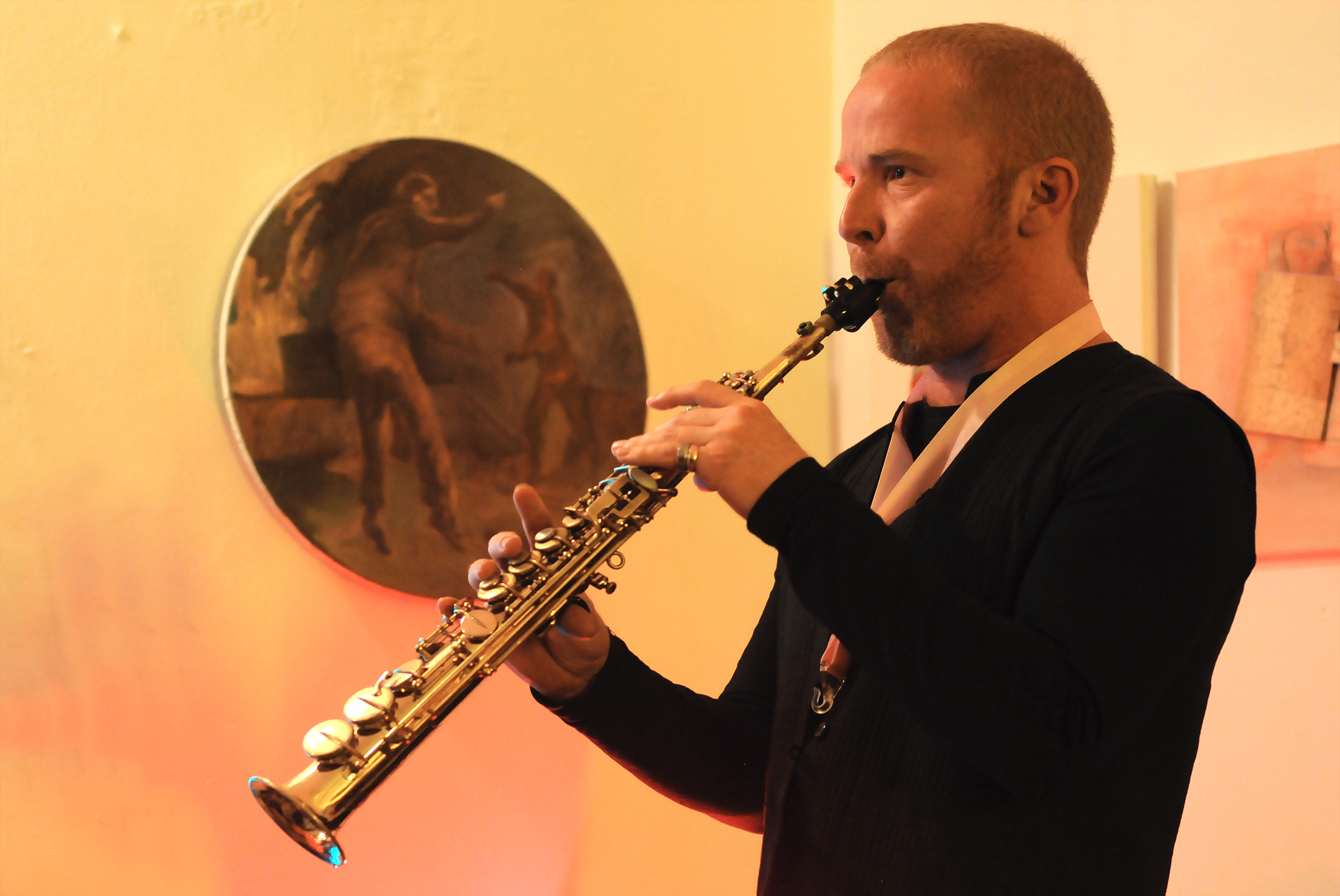
- Chisholm performing in Istanbul in 2010

Background information
- Born: 27 May 1975 (age 51); Ōtāhuhu, New Zealand
- Genres: Jazz, improvised, contemporary classical
- Occupations: Musician, record producer
- Instruments: Saxophone; clarinet; melodica; flute
- Years active: 1996–present
- Labels: Nonplace; Intuition; Enja; Moontower Foundation; Rattle
- Website: haydenchisholm.net

Hayden Chisholm (born 27 May 1975) is a saxophonist and multi-instrumentalist from New Zealand. He performs jazz, improvised music, and contemporary classical music.

== Life and career ==
Chisholm was raised in New Plymouth, New Zealand, by parents Heather and Doug Chisholm. His first musical experiences came with local Dixieland bands. He began playing clarinet at age nine before switching to what became his primary instrument, the alto saxophone, two years later. The early influences of Johnny Hodges, Sun Ra, Eric Dolphy were strong, being his first jazz records. He was a member of the award-winning New Plymouth Boys' High School Jazz band and won the prize for Most Outstanding Jazz Musician at the National Jazz Festival in Tauranga, 1991.

With a DAAD scholarship Chisholm attended the Musik Hochschule in Cologne, Germany. He studied saxophone with Frank Gratkowski. In 1997 he received the New Zealand Young Achievers Award which enabled him to continue his studies abroad. During these years he also studied Carnatic music in Chennai and travelled extensively in the Balkans learning the different musical traditions.

During his studies in Cologne Chisholm developed a system of micro-tonal fingerings for saxophone and so called "split-scales" which he presented on his 1996 debut solo CD Circe on Jazzhaus Musik. These scales split perfect intervals using quarter tones. His microtonal work was later featured on the Root70 album Root70 on 52nd 1/4 Street which received the German Critics Award.

During his studies in Cologne he met many musicians he still collaborates with today including Marcus Schmickler, Nils Wogram, John Taylor, Felix Fan, Adrian Brendel, Burnt Friedman, Jochen Rückert, Antonis Anissegos, Jaki Liebezeit, Claudio Bohorquez. He also worked under Mauricio Kagel who was then professor for composition.

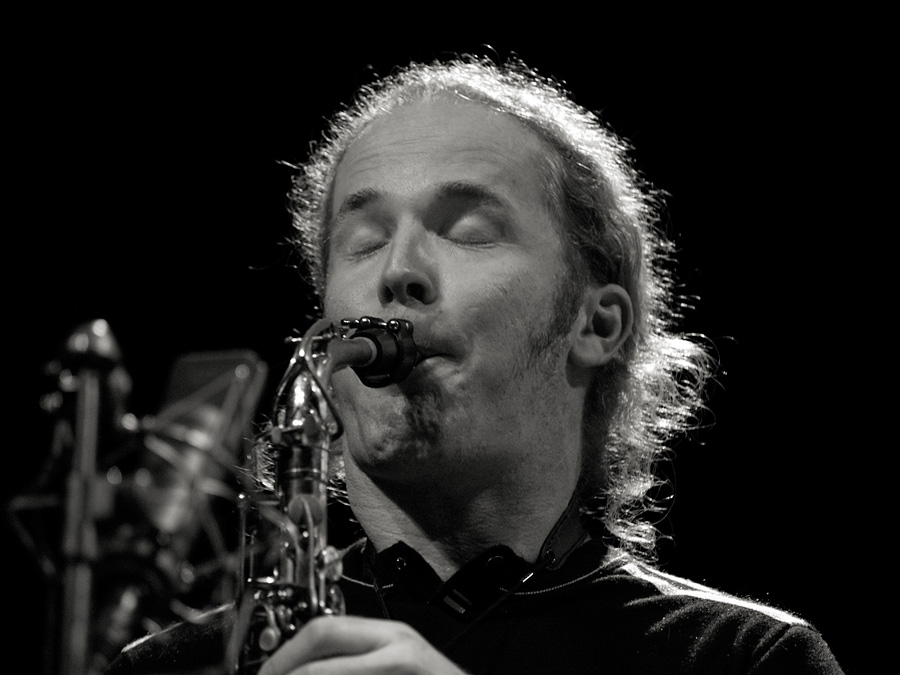
Hayden Chisholm, Moers Festival 2007

Since 2000 he has collaborated with the German artist Rebecca Horn. His work with her is wide-ranging, from composing the music for major site-specific installations "Moonmirror" (Mallorca, 2003), "Lumiere en Prison" (Paris, 2002), Spiriti de Madre Perla" (Naples, 2002), "Twilight Transit" (NYC 2004), Heart Shadows (Lisbon, 2005), "Das Universum in einer Perle" (Berlin, 2006), to recomposing the music for her early performance films which was released on a complete DVD set in 2005. In 2008 he worked as assistant director with Horn for the Salvatore Sciarrino Opera Luci mie traditrici at the Salzburger Festspiele. In 2009 he composed the music for her film Fata Morgana which was premiered at the Teatro La Fenice Opera House during the Venice Biannale. In 2011 he composed the music for her documentary film "Moonmirror Journey" which premiered in Berlin.

In 2001 he composed music for the German Theater (Deutsches Schauspielhaus) in Hamburg, working on Maria Stuart by Schiller and Arabische Nacht by Schimmelpfennig. In 2006 and 2007 he was musical director of the Earth Festival in Kenya which featured a large cast of international musicians, including Huun Huur Tu. In 2008 he performed with David Sylvian on the "World is Everything" tour. Since 2006 he teaches a yearly masterclass on Mount Pilion in Greece in the village of Agios Lavrentios. His course "The G-string of Pythagoras" fuses saxophone, just intonation, ancient music theory, and improvisation. In 2008 he was assistant director at the Salzburg Festspiele of the Opera "Luci Mie Traditrici" by Salvatore Sciarrino. In 2012 Chisholm was featured in the feature documentary Sound of Heimat – Deutschland singt directed by Arne Birkenstock and Jan Tengeler. In the film, Chisholm travels through Germany and explores authentic forms of German folk music. In 2013 he released a 13-CD Box set 13 Views of the Heart's Cargo which presents his most important recordings dating back to 2001. The first CD in this box, Love in Numbers, features works for saxophone in which Chisholm explores the Fibonacci series as it manifests in the overtone series.

In 2015 Hayden Chisholm contributed to Waywords and Meansigns, a collaborative project setting James Joyce's Finnegans Wake to music.

Hayden is a member of the quartet Root 70 with trombonist Nils Wogram. In 2018 Chisholm was a finalist at the New Zealand Jazz Awards in the Recorded Music NZ Best Jazz Artist category.

== Discography ==
=== As leader/co-leader ===
- Circe (Jazzhaus Musik, 1996)
- Miniatures (2nd Floor, 1999)
- Subultra: NGC2997 with Jochen Bohnes (Subultra Edition, 2000)
- Master Fu's Relaxation Exercises (2002)
- Subultra: Subultra Live with Jochen Bohnes (Subultra Edition, 2003)
- Music for Rebecca Horn's Installations (Holzwarth Publications, 2005)
- Nearness (Holzwarth Publications, 2005)
- Doha: Music to Benefit the Great Stupa at Shambhala Mountain Center with Claudio Bohorquez and Gareth Lubbe (Padma Media, 2005)
- Amazing Daze with Marcus Schmickler (Haepna, 2006)
- The Embassadors [sic]: Healing the Music (Nonplace, 2007)
- The Embassadors: Coptic Dub (Nonplace, 2009)
- Breve (Pirouet, 2015)
- Off World with Wolff Parkinson White (2021)
- Medna Roso with Kit Downes and Pjev (Redd Hook, 2023)
- Release and Return with Jonathan Crayford (Rattle, 2025)
- As If The Stormy Years Had Passed with Philip Zoubek (Rattle, 2025)

Unwind

- Unwind: Unwind (Rattle, 2017)
- Unwind: Orange (Rattle, 2018)
- Unwind: Saffron (Rattle, 2020)
- Unwind: Daylight (Rattle, 2023)
- Unwind: Embers (Rattle, 2025)

13 Views of the Heart's Cargo (Moontower Foundation, 2013) (13-CD box set)

- Love in Numbers
- The Rabbit's Dream of the Inner Mongolia
- Nearness Live
- Lula Pena and Hayden Chisholm Live in Berlin
- Hayden plays Haydn
- Mute Density with the Lucern Jazz Orchestra
- Fragmented Teaching
- The Dharma Cowboy
- The Life of Hands in Love
- Breve - Live at Plush
- The Well-Tempered Sruti Box
- Auto-Poetica – Works for Saxophone
- My Blood Flows from Scotland to Armenia

Cusp of Oblivion (Moontower Foundation, 2016) (13-CD box set)

- Cusp of Oblivion
- Sisyphus Runs
- The Void Between Us
- Finn Again Wakes
- Temptation
- Glowing Core
- Blowslap
- Cassiopeian Slowdance
- Ace of My Heart
- Transitioning Alpha Theta
- Sacred Love and Pain
- Oracle Hymns
- Star Shepherd

=== As sideman ===
With Bernd Friedmann

- Burnt Friedman & The Nu Dub Players: Can't Cool (Nonplace, 2003)
- Burnt Friedman & Jaki Liebezeit: Out in the Sticks with David Sylvian (Nonplace, 2005)
- Burnt Friedman & Jaki Liebezeit: Secret Rhythms 2 (Nonplace, 2005)
- Flanger: Spirituals (Nonplace, 2005)
- Burnt Friedman: First Night Forever (Nonplace, 2007)
- Burnt Friedman & Jaki Liebezeit: Secret Rhythms 3 (Nonplace, 2008)
- Flanger: Bibliotheque Pascal (Nonplace, 2010)
- Burnt Friedman & Jaki Liebezeit: Secret Rhythms 4 (Nonplace, 2012)
- Burnt Friedman: Bokoboko (Nonplace, 2012)

With Sebastian Gramss

- Slow Fox: The Wood (Jazzwerkstatt, 2014)
- Slow Fox: Gentle Giants (Traumton, 2017)
- Slow Fox: Freedom (Rent a Dog, 2021)
- Slow Fox: Atlas (Rent a Dog, 2023)

With Nine Horses

- Money for All (Samadhi Sound, 2007)
- Snow Borne Sorrow with David Sylvian and Steve Jansen (Samadhi Sound, 2005)

With Pluramon

- Dreams Top Rock (Karaoke Kalk, 2003)
- The Monstrous Surplus (Karaoke Kalk, 2007)

With Dejan Terzic

- Melanoia (Enja, 2013)
- Red (BMC, 2016)
- Labyrinth (Enja, 2015)

With Nils Wogram's Root 70

- Root 70 (2nd Floor, 2000)
- Gettin' Rooted (Enja, 2004)
- Heaps Dub (Nonplace, 2005)
- Fahrvergnugen (Intuition, 2006)
- Root 70 on 52nd 1/4 St (Intuition, 2009)
- Listen to Your Woman (Nwog, 2011)
- Rio Mare (Nwog, 2013)
- Wise Men Can't Be Wrong (Nwog, 2015)
- Luxury Habits (Nwog, 2017)
- Root 70 20th Anniversary box set (NWog, 2020)
- The Pristine Sound of Root 70 (Nwog, 2023)

With Zeitkratzer

- Cheap Imitation – Schonberg Pierrot Lunaire with Reinhold Friedl and Markus Weiser (Zeitkratzer, 2007)
- Volksmusik (Zeitkratzer, 2008)
- Electronics – Carsten Nicolai (Zeitkratzer, 2008)
- Electronics – Terre Thaemlitz (Zeitkratzer, 2008)
- Electronics – Keiki Haino (Zeitkratzer, 2008)
- Old School – Alvin Lucier (Zeitkratzer, 2010)
- Old School – James Tenney (Zeitkratzer, 2010)
- Old School – John Cage (Zeitkratzer, 2010)
- Plays Pres [Polish Radio Experimental Studio], (Bold, 2010)

With others

- Hans Ludemann RISM 7: FutuRISM (Jazz Haus Musik, 1998)
- Jochen Rueckert: Introduction (Jazzline, 1998)
- John Goldsby: Viewpoint (Nagel-Heyer, 2001)
- Nils Wogram Sextet: Odd and Awkward (Enja, 2001)
- Thorsten Wollmann/WDR Big Band Cologne: Colours of Siam (In & Out, 2002)
- Antonis Anissegos: Amoebas (Konnex, 2004)
- Dan Sperber Complex: I (2006)
- Coloma: Love's Recurring Dream (Italic, 2009)
- Juergen Friedrich: Monosuite (Pirouet, 2012)
- P.O.P: Täbriz (Monotype Records, 2013)
- Norman Meehan: Small Holes in the Silence (Rattle, 2015)
- Nautilus: Infrablue (Two Rivers, 2016)
- Wout Gooris: Some Time (2016)
- Tilo Weber: Four Fauns (Mallet Muse, 2018)
- Nils Wogram: Muse (NWog, 2021)
- Phil Donkin Trio: Keep It Clean (2023)
