= Primordial Undermind =

Experimental/psychedelic rock band

- Origin: Pasadena, California
- Genres: Psychedelic rock, Experimental, Drone
- Years active: 1989–present
- Labels: Strange Attractors Audio House; Emperor Jones; Camera Obscura; September Gurls; Reverb Worship; Stoned To Death; Feathered Coyote Records; Sunrise Ocean Bender; Deep Water Acres
- Members: Eric Arn, Christoph Weikinger, Antonio Rosa de Pauli, Xavier Scholz

Primordial Undermind is an experimental/psychedelic rock band, begun in 1988 when guitarist Eric Arn of Connecticut's Crystalized Movements (the 80's band of guitar hero Wayne Rogers of Major Stars, Magic Hour) moved to California, and continuing today in Austria. Arn initially went to London in 1989 to record demos with the Bevis Frond's Nick Saloman. These sessions produced "Swimming the Ultramoon" for the 1991 7" compilation "If I Could Hear You I Would Hit You" on Baby Huey.

The band has a policy of open, collective membership, leading to numerous lineups over the years. Their Los Angeles County residency from 1991 to 1995 produced the "Sferic Mandalas from the Ecclips'd Eye" 7" on Baby Huey, "Aenesthetic Revelations" 7" on Dionysus, and a full-length cassette on Shrimper Records called "And All Tall Monsters Stand". Two albums were released in 1994 and 1997: "Yet More Wonders of the Invisible World" on September Gurls of Germany, and "You and Me and the Continuum" on the Australian label Camera Obscura.

In 1996 the band relocated to Boston, appearing at the Deep Heaven festivals (which they in large part initiated), and the Ptolemaic Terrascope's Terrastock festival. In 1998 the group moved to the SF Bay area where they performed at Terrastock II and recorded PU's third album "Universe I've Got". This prompted the band's first tour, where they were joined by Salamander (Minneapolis, MN) and Overhang Party (Tokyo) for a trip from west to east coast and back, including a stop at the Insidious Spectacle fest in Philadelphia. 1999 found the band moving to Austin, Texas. Here, a relatively spare quartet including guitarist Tom Carter (of Charalambides) recorded the Undermind's fourth album "Beings of Game P-U" and a full septet produced "Thin Shells of Revolution", for Austin's Emperor Jones label. The band appeared at SXSW (five times), and toured at various times with Kinski, Davis Redford Triad, and ST37.

In 2005 the Undermind settled in Vienna, Austria. A series of recording sessions just before the move produced an album, "Loss of Affect" which was released on Strange Attractors Audio House in fall, 2006. Further touring of the US followed in 2007, of the UK in 2008 and 2011, and throughout Europe in 2007, 2008, 2010, 2012, and 2013. A new album, "Last Worldly Bond" was recorded live in Vienna at the infamous Amann Studios and released on Strange Attractors Audio House in early 2011. A limited edition live album "Live in Austin" was released by UK label Reverb Worship in May, 2013.

A collaborative improvised album with English noise-rockers Thought Forms followed on Reverb Worship in 2014. Two more live albums, recorded in 1997 and 2003, were released by Feathered Coyote Records in 2015–2016. Primordial Undermind's long-awaited latest studio album "An Imaginal Abydos" was released as an LP on the Sunrise Ocean Bender and Deep Water Acres labels in summer 2022, and has garnered rave reviews.
