= Terrastock =

Occasional music festival mainly held in the USA

Terrastock is a music festival organised periodically by Phil McMullen, formerly editor of the Ptolemaic Terrascope and since 2005 the publisher of the Terrascope Online website. The event typically features independent bands playing psychedelic rock. It has been held on six occasions in the US and once in London, UK.

== Origin ==
The first Terrastock event was initially conceived by Phil McMullen and Robert Jaz of the Providence, Rhode Island based band V. Majestic in the winter of 1996/1997. Robert Jaz had asked McMullen about holding a benefit concert in Providence, RI for the Ptolemaic Terrascope Zine. As the two formulated a plan for the benefit which quickly grew into more of a festival idea, McMullen suggested the name Terrastock and the two agreed. A wishlist lineup was conceived and a framework originated. The festival was then fully organized by McMullen and Jaz along with Mark Stone of the Providence-based band Medicine Ball, as well as the Newport, RI based record label Flydaddy, which was run by former Sub Pop employees, Kevin O'Leary and Adam Silverman. Flydaddy had previously released a Ptolemaic Terrascope benefit compilation called 'Succour.'

An arrangement was made with a friend of Robert Jaz's, the poster artist, James Draper, who was also the operator of an art gallery/speakeasy performance space called The Renegade Gallery/The Rogue Lounge which was located in Providence within an industrial space in the old Atlantic Mills. The space hosted the three-day festival and garnered much national and local press.

In November 2010 McMullen "unashamedly" admitted that the Terrastock festivals "were directly influenced and inspired by the now legendary Zig Zag Benefit Concert".

== Chronology ==
- Terrastock 1: The Rogue Lounge, Providence, Rhode Island, 25 –27 April 1997
- Terrastock 2: Custer Avenue Stages, San Francisco, 17 –19 April 1998
- Terrastock 3: University of London, London, 27 –29 August 1999
- Terrastock 4: The Showbox, Seattle, 3 –5 November 2000
- Terrastock 5: The Axis, Boston, 11 –13 October 2002
- Terrastock 6: AS220 & the Pell Chafee Performance Center, Providence, Rhode Island, 21 –23 April 2006
- Terrastock 7: Mellwood Art & Entertainment Center, Louisville, Kentucky, 19 –22 June 2008

== Terrastock Lineups ==
=== Terrastock 1 ===
Silver Apples, Abunai!, Windy and Carl, Thee Hydrogen Terrors, Deviants, Cul de Sac, Barbara Manning, Science Kit, The Azusa Plane, The Lothars, Primordial Undermind, Orans, Neutral Milk Hotel, Supreme Dicks, Mary Lou Lord, Tadpoles (band), Flying Saucer Attack, Medicine Ball, The Bevis Frond, Damon and Naomi, Alva, The Olivia Tremor Control, Major Stars, The Alchemysts, Papas Fritas, Bardo Pond, Hilkka, Lhasa Cement Plant, V. Majestic, Hovercraft, Richard Davies, Magic Hour

=== Terrastock 2 ===
50 Foot Hose, The Azusa Plane, Roy Montgomery, Grimble Grumble, Kendra Smith, Major Stars, The Mountain Goats, Alastair Galbraith, Mick Farren & the Deviants, Bevis Frond, Medicine Ball, V Majestic, Windy and Carl, Young Fresh Fellows, Damon and Naomi, Masaki Batoh & Michio Kurihara of Ghost, Tom Rapp, Stone Breath, Neutral Milk Hotel, The Olivia Tremor Control, Elf Power, The Loud Family, Primordial Undermind, Alva, Loren Mazzacane Connors, Green Pajamas, Spaceheads, Silver Apples, Alchemysts, Pelt, SubArachnoid Space, Cul de Sac, The Lothars, Bardo Pond, Clockbrains, Mudhoney, Brother JT & Vibrolux

=== Terrastock 3 ===
Bardo Pond, Man, Green Pajamas, Lucky Bishops, Windy and Carl, Freed Unit, Spaceheads, The Azusa Plane, Pat Orchard, Air Traffic Controllers, The Bevis Frond, Alchemysts + Simeon, Damon and Naomi, Tom Rapp, Spacious Mind, Warser Gate, The Lothars, Kirk Lake, Pop Off Tuesday, Bablicon, Mac MacLeod, Abunai!, Hood, Broken Dog, My Drug Hell, White Hotel, Piano Magic, Arco, The Autumn Leaves, Green Ray

=== Terrastock 4 ===
Ethereal Counterbalance, Voyager One, The Lothars, Windy and Carl, The Monkeywrench, Tarentel, Wellwater Conspiracy, Abunai!, Charalambides, Damon and Naomi, Ghost, Major Stars, The Minus Five, Martyn Bates, Crome Syrcus, Pat Orchard, Subarachnoid Space, Amber Asylum, The Linus Pauling Quartet, The Green Pajamas, Doug Yule, Moe Tucker, Stone Breath, Delicate AWOL, Donovan's Brain, Six Organs Of Admittance, Kinski, Bardo Pond, Children Of The Rainbow, Country Joe McDonald, The Alchemysts, The Bevis Frond

=== Terrastock 5 ===
NonLoc, Pat Orchard, ST37, Stone Breath, The Iditarod, Hopewell, The Essex Green, Charalambides, Major Stars, Windy and Carl, Ghost, Ethereal Counterbalance, Greg Weeks, The Lucky Bishops, Paik, Six Organs of Admittance, Dipsomaniacs, Landing, Motorpsycho, Surface of Eceon, Damon and Naomi, Tom Rapp, The Hushdrops, The Alchemysts, Lilys, Barbara Manning & the Go-Luckys!, The Sunshine Fix, The Lothars, Sonic Youth, Delicate AWOL, The Bevis Frond, Lockgroove, Bardo Pond, Kinski, The Spacious Mind, Subarachnoid Space, Acid Mothers Temple

=== Terrastock 6 ===
Avarus, Bardo Pond, Black Forest/Black Sea, Bridget St. John, Brothers of the Occult Sisterhood, Charalambides, Cul de Sac, Damon and Naomi, Fursaxa, Ghost, Glenn Jones, The Green Pajamas, Kemialliset Ystävät, Kinski, The Kitchen Cynics, Sharron Kraus, Landing, Larkin Grimm, Lightning Bolt, The Magic Carpathians Project, Major Stars, Marissa Nadler, MV+EE with the Bummer Road, Paik, P.G. Six, Jack Rose, Salamander, St. Joan, Spacious Mind, Spires that in the Sunset Rise, Tanakh, Thought Forms, Urdog, Windy and Carl

=== Terrastock 7 ===
The Photographic, Parlour, Elephant Micah, Dead Maids, Hush Arbors, United Bible Studies, Sharron Kraus, Ignatz, Antietam, Black Forest/Black Sea, Sleeping Pill, Tanakh, Plastic Crimewave Sound, The Linus Pauling Quartet, Major Stars, Damon and Naomi, Helena Espvall, Oneida, Wooden Shjips, Tara Jane O'Neil, Kinski, MV+EE with the Golden Road, Bardo Pond, Grails, Motorpsycho, Sapat, Mono, Kohoutek, Sexfist, Rob Sharples, Thee American Revolution, Insect Factory, Simply Saucer, Pelt, Jack Rose and the Black Twig Pickers, The Entrance Band, Windy and Carl, Paik, Makoto Kawabata

== See also ==
- Ptolemaic Terrascope
