= The Green Pajamas =

American musical group

- Origin: Seattle, Washington, United States
- Genres: Neo-psychedelia, indie rock, Paisley Underground, jangle pop
- Years active: 1984–current
- Labels: Green Monkey, Hidden Agenda, Camera Obscura, Woronzow
- Members: Jeff Kelly, Joe Ross, Eric Lichter, Laura Weller, Scott Vanderpool
- Past members: Karl Wilhelm, Steve Lawrence, Bruce Haedt
- Website: Secret Day

The Green Pajamas are a musical group from Seattle, Washington. They formed in the spring of 1984 when Jeff Kelly and Joe Ross recorded and released their first album, Summer Of Lust. They are probably best known for the regional hit single "Kim the Waitress".

The band released 33 albums between 1984 and 2014. The band has never been picked up by a major label.

== History ==
The Pajamas somehow manage to sound like holding two kaleidoscopes side by side and using them as binoculars to see the future of rock'n'roll

— Phil McMullen, Bucketfull of Brains magazine, July 1987

Joe Ross and Jeff Kelly met at a party and discovered a common interest in 60s psychedelia. Inspired by 1983's Los Angeles "paisley underground" music scene the duo decided to start a similar scene in their home town of Seattle. By spring of 1984 they had recorded and released a homemade cassette called Summer of Lust.

The 7" record "Kim the Waitress" attracted regional college radio airplay in the mid-80s, and the band went on to record "Sister Anne", and the albums Book Of Hours and Ghosts of Love, before breaking up during the sessions for Ghosts of Love (released 1990 to some critical attention on the L.A. label Bomp!). During the next few years, Jeff Kelly released solo recordings on cassette. The band re-united in 1994 in the wake of "Kim The Waitress" covers released that year by Material Issue and the Seattle band Sister Psychic. A third single, "Song for Christina", was released. (The Green Pajamas' early singles, including "Kim The Waitress", can be heard on the 1997 anthology Indian Winter.)

The Green Pajamas, "Kim the Waitress" (1984)

With the 1999 release of Seven Fathoms Down and Falling on Nick Saloman's Woronzow records, they played the 1999 Terrastock 3 festival in London. They have been Terrastock regulars, playing at Terrastock 2 in San Francisco, No. 4 in Seattle and No. 6 in Providence, RI.

In 2009 the band returned to the Seattle record label where they started and has been putting out a steady stream of releases, both reissues and new material.

== Band members ==
- Jeff Kelly – guitar, vocals, keyboards
- Joe Ross – bass, vocals
- Scott Vanderpool – drums
- Eric Lichter – keyboards, percussion, vocals
- Laura Weller – vocals, guitar

=== Former members ===
- Karl Wilhelm – drums
- Steven Lawrence – guitar, vocals, bass
- Bruce Haedt – keyboards, vocals

== Discography ==
Jeff Kelly has also recorded several solo albums, an album with his wife Susanne Kelly and three with Laura Weller as Goblin Market. Eric Lichter has recorded two solo albums as well as albums by the Picture Day and The Life.

Albums

- Summer Of Lust (1984 on cassette by Green Monkey, US, re-issued in 1989 on LP by Ubic (UK), in 2012 by Green Monkey (US) and in 2014 as Summer of Lust Reissue by Munster, Spain)
- Book Of Hours (1986) Green Monkey LP (US) – re-issued 1988 Di Di Music LP (Greece), 1989 A-Go Go Records LP (Australia), 1989 Bouncing Head LP (Germany), 2010 The Complete Book Of Hours Green Monkey – (US) CD
- November (1988) Green Monkey cassette (US)
- Ghosts Of Love (1990) Green Monkey/Bomp LP (US), Di Di Music LP [Greece] – re-issued 2000 on Get Hip – CD (US)
- Strung Behind The Sun (1997) Camera Obscura – CD (Australia)
- All Clues Lead To Meagan's Bed (1999) Camera Obscura – CD (Australia)
- Seven Fathoms Down and Falling (1999) Woronzow LP and CD (UK), Rubric CD (USA)
- Narcotic Kisses (2000) Camera Obscura LP and CD (Australia)
- This Is Where We Disappear (2001) Woronzow CD (UK) / Rubric CD (US)
- Lust Never Sleeps (2002) Endgame – (US) CD
- Northern Gothic (2002) Camera Obscura – (Australia) CD
- Essence Of Carol (2003) Luna – (US) CD EP
- Ten White Stones (2004), Hidden Agenda – (US) CD
- 21st Century Seance (2005) Hidden Agenda – (US) CD
- The Night Races into Anna (2006) Hidden Agenda – (US) CD
- If You Knew What I Dreamed: The Green Pajamas Play The Jeff Kelly Songbook (2007) St. Brigid – (US) Digital LP
- Hidden Minutes (2009) Camera Obscura – LP (Australia)
- Poison In The Russian Room (2009) Hidden Agenda – (US) CD
- The Red, Red Rose (2010) Green Monkey – (US) CD EP
- Green Pajama Country (2011) Green Monkey/Endgame – (US) CD
- Death By Misadventure (2012) Green Monkey – (US) CD
- Happy Halloween! (2014) Green Monkey – (US) CD (re-issued of Happy Halloween cassette – 1984)
- To the End of the Sea (2016) Sugarbush Records – (US) CD/LP
- Supernatural Afternoon (2017) Sugarbush Records – (US) CD/LP
- Phantom Lake: Northern Gothic 3 (2018) Green Monkey – (US) CD/LP
- Sunlight Might Weigh Even More (2021) Green Monkey – (US) CD/LP
- Forever for a Little While (2022) Green Monkey – (US) CD/LP

Singles

- Kim The Waitress / Jennifer (1984) Green Monkey 7 inch record [US]
- Kim The Waitress / Peppermint Stick (1985) Bouncing Head 7-inch record [Germany]
- End Of Love (1988) Sound Affects Magazine 7-inch clear flexi-disc [Denmark]
- Sister Anne / Emily Grace (1988) Green Monkey 7-inch record [US]
- Such A Lovely Daughter (1989) Unhinged Magazine 7-inch flexi-disc [UK]
- Song For Christina / I Have Touched Madness (1993) Endgame 7-inch record [US]
- Song For Christina / A Nightmare (1998) Camera Obscura 7-inch record [Australia]
- These Are The Best Times / Vampire Crush (1998) Camera Obscura 7-inch record [Australia]
- Dreams of Rhonda / In A Lonely Way (2001) Earworm 7-inch single record [UK]
- You Can't Look (2009) St. Brigid Digital Single [US]
- The Red, Red Rose (2010) St. Brigid/Green Monkey Digital Single [US]
- Why Good Men Go Bad (2010) St. Brigid Digital Single [US]
- London Sundays / She's Had Enough (2011) Vagrant 7-inch record [US]

EPs

- Strung Out (1998) Camera Obscura (Australia), Endgame (US) extended play CD
- The Carolers' Song (2001) Hidden Agenda – CD EP (US)
- In A Glass Darkly: Songs Inspired By The Stories of J. S. Le Fanu (2002) Hidden Agenda – (US) CD EP
  - homage to author Sheridan Le Fanu, co-written with Laura Weller,
- If She Only Knew (2002) Luna – (US)CD EP

Compilations

- Indian Winter (1997) Get Hip – CD (US)
  - anthology of first three singles, plus tracks previously appearing on compilations
- Through Glass Coloured Roses: The Best Of the Green Pajamas (2003) Hidden Agenda – (US) CD
- Box of Secrets: Northern Gothic Season 2 (2007) Hidden Agenda – (US) CD
- Edge Of The Night (Unreleased Vol. 1) (2010) St. Brigid – (US) Digital LP
- Live '98 (Unreleased Vol.2) (2011) St. Brigid – (US) Digital LP

Jeff Kelly solo releases

- Baroquen Hearts (1985) Green Monkey Cassette [US]
- Coffee in Nepal (1986) Green Monkey Cassette [US] Re-issued (1992) Di Di Music LP [Greece]
- Portugal (1990) Green Monkey Cassette [US]
- Private Electric Storm (1992) Green Monkey Cassette [US]
- Ash Wednesday Rain (1995) Green Monkey CD [US]
- Melancholy Sun The Home Recordings of Jeff Kelly (1999) Camera Obscura 4-CD box set [Australia]
- Indiscretion (2001) Hidden Agenda CD [US]
- For The Swan in the Hallway (2004) Hidden Agenda CD [US]

Jeff Kelly and Susanne Kelly releases

- By Reckless Moonlight (2014) Green Monkey CD [US]

Eric Lichter solo releases

- Palm Wine Sunday Blue (2002) Hidden Agenda CD [US]
- Picture Day – Wild Aim (2010) Diamond Market Records [US]
- Elks in Paris (2012) Diamond Market Records [US]

Albums by The Goblin Market (Jeff Kelly and Laura Weller)

- Ghostland (2001) Camera Obscura CD [Australia]
- Haunted: Songs inspired by the stories of Joyce Carol Oates (2005) Camera Obscura CD [Australia]
- Beneath Far Gondal's Foreign Sky (2012) Green Monkey Records [US]
