= The Linus Pauling Quartet =

- Origin: Houston, Texas
- Genres: Stoner rock, psychedelic rock, garage rock
- Years active: 1994-2017
- Labels: Worship Guitars, September Gurls, Fleece, Camera Obscura, Home Skool, Mizmaze,
- Members: Stephen Finley, Clinton Heider, Charlie Horshack, Larry Liska, Ramon Medina, Flip Osman, Carol Sandin
- Website: http://www.worshipguitars.org/LP4/index.html

The Linus Pauling Quartet was an American psychedelic rock group which specializes in a specific subgenre known as "Texas Psych", but frequently dabbles also in garage rock, stoner rock, punk rock, and heavy metal at various points throughout their discography. The LP4 was formed in 1994 by veterans of various local groups from the Houston and Clear Lake areas of Texas. Born of the same musical cauldron that birthed such renowned Texas Psych favorites as The Mike Gunn, Dry Nod, and Schlong Weasel, bands which also included later members of Charalambides and Dunlavy, the LP4 got off the ground when guitarist Ramon Medina and bassist Stephen Finley recruited drummer Larry Liska and singer/guitarist Clinton Heider and the quartet began writing and recording songs for their first album, Immortal Chinese Classics Music, released in 1995 on their own Worship Guitars label. The album surprisingly earned considerable attention beyond their native Houston, garnering notable reviews in several music magazines such as Q Music, Factsheet Five, Alternative Press, Crohinga Well, and Ptolemaic Terrascope, and featured "The Linus Theme" and "Hamburger Girl", two songs which came to define the band's early years, and which the LP4 revisited many times throughout their career.

The band's notice by Ptolemaic Terrascope was particularly helpful, as the LP4 were invited to contribute a track to the magazine's inaugural benefit compilation double-CD Succour. An all-night practice space recording session yielded not only their contribution "Dartania", which was chosen as the lead-off track on the benefit album, but also a batch of other tracks split evenly between improvisations and structured songs, which were ultimately released by German label September Gurls in 1997 as a self-titled limited edition vinyl album.

Armed with a recording contract with September Gurls, in 1996 the band added analog synthesizer player Flip Osman and saxophonist/guitarist/singer Charlie Horshack, swelling their ranks and expanding their sonic palette, and this lineup released Killing You With Rock in 1998. The following year, they were featured on a split 7-inch vinyl single with Italian band Kryptasthesie, contributing a very rare live version of their song "Jason Bill", a tribute to the erstwhile Charalambides guitarist.

The year 2000 was an active year for the Linus Pauling Quartet: they were invited to Seattle, Washington, to play at the fourth Terrastock psychedelic music festival alongside such musical luminaries as Bardo Pond, Moe Tucker, and Ghost; and they released Ashes in the Bong of God, a "concept album" related to their ongoing saga of the "bongs of power", alien "bug people," and "the Great Singularity," issued on double vinyl in Europe through the September Gurls label and on CD in the United States through the Fleece label. It was also during this time that Flip Osman left Houston and the band added keyboardist and photo-theremin player Carol Sandin to the group, though both members were present at the band's appearance at Terrastock IV.

The LP4 contributed a notable version of Syd Barrett's song "Vegetable Man" to The Vegetable Man Project, a compilation of wildly disparate covers of that song released by Italian label Oggetti Volanti Non Identificati in 2002.

In 2003 the band released their final offering on the September Gurls label: C6H8O6, a massive slab of psych-rock showing the full range of the band's abilities, including MC5-esque garage rock, a psychedelic depiction of airplanes falling out of the sky, songs about bongs, a song about eating Mexican food with Satan, and a lush psych-rock cover of Kraftwerk's "Hall of Mirrors".

The band appeared at showcases at Austin's South by Southwest festival in 2004, 2005, and 2008. Otherwise, the next few years were outwardly quiet for the LP4, but they were hard at work recording a large cache of material which would go on to comprise much of their subsequent two albums, and continuing to compose more material for future releases, intermittently taking breaks to play shows in their native Houston; Carol Sandin departed the group during this time. All Things Are Light, self-released in conjunction with Camera Obscura on purple vinyl and made up primarily of some of the band's heaviest music to date, garnered a considerable number of positive reviews upon its release in December 2007. On the heels of this release, the band was again invited to perform at Terrastock in June 2008, this time in Louisville, Kentucky, resulting in one of their most memorable shows, playing alongside such notable psychedelic groups as MV & EE, Robert Schneider's Thee American Revolution, Damon & Naomi, and Kawabata Makoto.

2010 saw the band release a 7-inch vinyl split single with Austin sister-band ST 37; ST 37 contributed a cover of Helios Creed's "Lactating Purple", while the Linus Pauling Quartet debuted their original piece "Monster". Only months later the band released Horns of Ammon, an album of songs recorded with Carol Sandin, primarily dating back to 2003-2005, released on Homeskool Records; it included the single "Monster", as well as the biker anthem "HAWG!!!", previously released as a single through the extremely limited-edition Grey Ghost series in Houston. Though the album was essentially an "odds and sods" release, documenting a set of more melodic and textural music than appeared on the other "official" albums contemporaneously released, it received largely positive reviews. The band released their next and eighth official studio album, entitled Bag of Hammers, in September 2012. A heavier sounding release than the material presented on Horns of Ammon, it also included one of the first examples of the band employing a guest vocalist as the lead singer on the song "Rust", which was sung by Hearts of Animals vocalist Mlee Marie. It was at this point that the band began producing homemade videos to some of their songs; album lead-off track "Crom" and "Victory Gin" were both set to videos created predominantly by band guitarist Ramon Medina.

In January 2013, the Linus Pauling Quartet released Assault on the Vault of the Ancient Bonglords, a three-disk anthology covering their earliest recordings from 1994 all the way through 2010, packaged with a fully playable Dungeons & Dragons-style dice-based roleplaying game module, and a purple 20-sided die. The band followed this up in July 2013 with the 7-inch EP Find What You Love And Let It Kill You, which showcased the songwriting of Ramon Medina, as well as a considerably softer side of the Linus psychedelic sound. The EP also resulted in another Medina video, this time for the song "The Road", which again featured Mlee Marie, playing a bell-like keyboard part which helped underline the song's fragile feel and circular structure.

In October 2014, the Linus Pauling Quartet released both a video and a 7-inch single for their song C is for Cthulhu, an epic retelling of the discovery of Cthulhu and the ensuing slaughter and madness. For the B side, the LP4 reached back into Houston's swirling psychedelic past to cover My Desire, originally by Houston's Pain Teens, featuring Bliss Blood and Scott Ayres. The accompanying video starred Burn the Boats vocalist Stevie Sims and MMA fighter Makana Clemons as intrepid and fearless archaeologists who seek that which should be left unknown. Employing a rugged captain and his trusty crew (The LP4’s Charlie Horshack, Clinton Heider, and Stephen Finley), they sail to the fabled R’lyeh to meet their fate. The new video was described by The Big Takeover as “insanely ambitious” and by the Houston Press as a “monumental work” . Over a year was spent building sets, crafting a stop motion Cthulhu from scratch, as well as shooting stop motion sequences and live actors.

In May 2015, the band released the single "Planck", a song co-written with band associate Brandon R. Brown, based on his contemporaneously published book Driven By Vision, Broken By War about German physicist Max Planck, as a teaser for their next full-length release. Finally, the band released its long awaited follow-up to Bag of Hammers: entitled Ampalanche, it released first on vinyl through Italian label Vincebus Eruptum in January 2016, and then in April of that year, it was released digitally online, paired with a 49-minute bonus track: "Vi, de Druknede (We, the Drowned)", a droning wordless group improvisation based on twin electronic tambouras. In July 2017, the group contributed side one to the Vincebus Eruptum label's third Psychedelic Battles split LP with Colt38, including their final masterpiece, "Jolakottur," the lyrics of which were derived from Icelandic folklore.

Shortly thereafter, the band split, with lead singer/songwriter/guitarist Clinton Heider moving on to new adventures, including playing guitar with Mlee Marie's band Hearts of Animals, and the rest of the group re-teaming with earlier keyboardist/vocalist Carol Sandin Cooley, now calling themselves the Cryptographers, with Medina and Sandin Cooley taking over singing and songwriting duties, sporting a somewhat poppier sound informed by krautrock, indie rock, and the Velvet Underground.

== Selected discography ==
- Immortal Chinese Classics (Worship Guitars, CD, USA, 1995)
- Untitled (Alien LP) (September Gurls, LP, Germany, 1997)
- Killing You With Rock (September Gurls, CD Germany, 1998)
- VA - Succour (Ptolemaic Terrascope, 2X CD, UK, 1995) (Reissued by Flydaddy, USA 1996)
- LP4/Kryptasthesie (Mizmaze, 7-inch, Italy, 1999)
- VA - Thou Shalt Expand Your Mind (Ptolemaic Terrascope, CD, UK, 1999)
- Ashes in the Bong of God (Fleece, CD, USA, 2000)
- Ashes in the Bong of God (September Gurls, 2x LP, Germany, 2000)
- VA - The Vegetable Man Project (Oggetti Volanti Non Identificati, CD, Italy, 2002)
- C6H8O6 (September Gurls, CD, Germany, 2003)
- Songs of the Cretaceous (Shifty Pope, CD, USA, 2005)
- All Things Are Light (Camera Obscura, LP, Australia, 2007)
- HAWG!!! - Grey Ghost No. 48 (Grey Ghost, CD, USA, 2007)
- LP4/ST37 (No Label, 7-inch, USA, 2010)
- Horns of Ammon (Homeskool Records, CD, USA, 2010)
- Bag of Hammers (Homeskool Records, CD, USA, 2012)
- Assault on the Vault of the Ancient Bonglords (Homeskool Records, 3×CD, USA, 2013)
- Find What You Love and Let It Kill You (Homeskool Records, 7-inch, USA, 2013)
- C is for Cthulhu b/w My Desire (Homeskool Records, 7-inch, USA, 2014)
- Ampalanche (Vincebus Eruptum, LP, Italy, 2016)
- Psychedelic Battles Volume Three (Vincebus Eruptum, split LP w/ Colt38, Italy, 2017)
