= Tanakh (band) =

Music group

Tanakh is the name of a musical collective from Richmond, Virginia as well as a reference to the music produced by the group. The collective was formed in 2000 by its primary songwriter, producer and recording engineer Jesse Poe.

== Background ==
Poe and Phil Murphy were then working as apprentices under John Morand at Sound of Music Studios to improve their recording skills. The two musicians would take turns recording each other after hours at the studio, using whatever instruments happened to be left around. This included many international instruments that Joan Osborne had recently left in studio. They would layer track upon track taking turns recording while the other played, and vice versa; some recordings from this time appeared on the bonus CD with the band's 2002 debut album Villa Claustrophobia. They also composed and recorded the score for Andrew Carnwath's silent film Greater Than Half which won The Audience Choice Award at Bare Bones International and the Rosebud Film Festival in Washington, D.C.

The duo began to perform live using analogue loops created live on stage with old tape machines and half broken equipment they salvaged from the Sound of Music equipment graveyards and thrift stores. Frustrated with limitations of analogue looping, they enlisted the help of Jeff 'Sanford' Krones, who lived with Poe at the Pyramid Institute, an abandoned Shriners Temple atop the collapsed Church Hill Tunnel, and Pat Best of Pelt. This quartet formed the core of the original Tanakh collective, playing live shows and recording improvisations at the Pyramid Institute and Sound of Music Studios along with many guests who joined performances as they were available.

Inspired in part by John Zorn's Tzadik label, Poe and Murphy's original idea was to provide a name that they could perform under and that anyone who they liked to play could perform or record under, with their dream being that there might be two or three Tanakh shows at the same time in different geographic locations. The band's self-titled 2004 EP on Alien8 Recordings came from a Pyramid Institute performance recorded by Bryan Hoffa who would later start a band Broken Hips with Murphy on guitar, and various instruments. This instrumental double disc was later mixed and mastered by King Crimson engineer Ronan Chris Murphy.

After initial plans to record a studio effort fell through due to other commitments, Poe worked as an engineer in Berlin at the Schaubu:hne am Halleschen Ufer before returning to record Villa Claustrophobia with Brian Paulson as engineer and with previous Tanakh guest performers such as the Dirty Three's Mick Turner, Anomoanon/Palace member Ned Oldham and Ravi Shankar associate Nirmal Bajekal. Via Turner and Oldham's brother Will Oldham, members of Godspeed You! Black Emperor heard the album, leading Montreal label Alien8 to contact Poe and sign Tanakh. Villa Claustrophobia was released in April 2002 to a variety of positive reviews, including Mark Richardson in Pitchfork Media and Ian Penman in The Wire.

Various line-ups of Tanakh performed and toured from this point forward, with a new key member being bassist/singer Michele Poulos, who Poe met around the time of Villa Claustrophobia's release. Poe, Poulos and a further core group of performers, including Agents of Good Roots drummer Brian Jones and guests Jim White and Sparklehorse associate/producer Alan Weatherhead, recorded the band's third full album Dieu Deuil, released in early 2004 on Alien8.

Poe relocated to Italy prior to the release of Dieu Deuil after the offer of an ESL teaching job in Florence; further Tanakh performances and tours were based out that city for the next few years. Most of Tanakh's fourth album, 2006's Ardent Fevers, was written in Italy but recorded in Richmond by Hoffa during a return visit to the city in the summer of 2004. Guest performers on Ardent Fevers included Isobel Campbell and Alex Neilson, who had been introduced to Poe by Alasdair Roberts after the two had played shows together in Scotland.

Taken from the same recording period as the Ardent Fevers sessions, Tanakh's fifth album, the 2007 release Saunders Hollow, was distinctly different from the collective's previous work in that Poulos was the lead vocalist throughout, with Poe concentrating on producing and performing and Hoffa once again recording an expanded lineup of the band, again featuring Campbell and Neilson as guest performers. Saunders Hollow was also unique in being released on Australian label Camera Obscura rather than Alien8, home to all the band's previous releases.

Other than singles on compilations, no further Tanakh releases have appeared since Saunders Hollow but the collective has continued to perform irregularly, including the opening set at the sixth Terrastock festival in Providence, Rhode Island in April 2006 and a one-off performance at the seventh Terrastock festival in Louisville, Kentucky in June 2008. This latter performance featured a unique lineup of Poe, Acid Mothers Temple lead figure Kawabata Makoto and members of Abunai! and United Bible Studies.

As of summer 2010 Poe is reported to be working on a series of collaborative singles; it is not certain if they will appear under the Tanakh name.

== Discography ==
- Villa Claustrophobia (released April 2002 on Alien8 Recordings)
- Dieu Deuil (released January 28, 2004 on Alien8 Recordings)
- Tanakh EP (released September 20, 2004 on Alien8 Recordings)
- Ardent Fevers (released March 7, 2006 on Alien8 Recordings)
- Saunders Hollow (released February 14, 2007 on Camera Obscura)
