= Resume the Cosmos =

Studio album by Rake.
- Released: September 30, 1998
- Genre: Experimental rock
- Length: 59:57
- Label: Camera Obscura
- Producer: Rake.

Rake. chronology
Fighting 2 Quarters and a Nickel (1998)	Resume the Cosmos (1998)	Ginseng Nights (2002)

Resume the Cosmos is the fourth studio album by Rake., released in 1998 by Camera Obscura.

== Track listing ==
All music is composed by Rake.

No.	Title	Length
1.	"[untitled]"	6:33
2.	"[untitled]"	16:38
3.	"[untitled]"	21:15
4.	"[untitled]"	9:48
5.	"[untitled]"	5:43

== Personnel ==
Adapted from the Resume the Cosmos liner notes.

Rake.

- Jim Ayre – electric guitar, clarinet, vocals
- Bill Kellum – bass guitar
- Carl Moller – drums, saxophone, mixing

== Release history ==
Region	Date	Label	Format	Catalog
United States	1998	Camera Obscura	CD	CAM016CD
