= Azusa Plane =

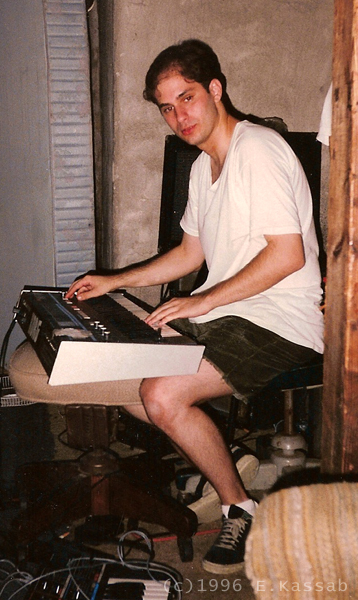
Jason DiEmilio (The Azusa Plane) recording "Two Projects To Harness The Surge Of The Tides" 7" in West Chester, Pennsylvania, 1996.

The Azusa Plane was the psychedelic music recording and performance project of Jason DiEmilio (1970 – 2006) of Clifton Heights, Pennsylvania. Performing almost exclusively on a Fender guitar and usually through echo effects, DiEmilio released three full-length studio efforts, a live disc, several EPs and a large number of singles, compilation contributions and split releases between the years 1995 and 2001. The Azusa Plane was the name of the location where the family patriarch dies in the Kurosawa film Ran.

After releasing a cassette on the Shrimper Records label (mainly known for bedroom recordings by songwriters like The Mountain Goats, Sentridoh and others) and a self-released single in 1995, both deeply indebted to the lo-fi drone-rock of Spacemen 3 and the Xpressway label, DiEmilio embarked on a never-completed series of ten split-singles with like-minded musicians, like guitarists Loren Mazzacane Connors and Roy Montgomery, on his own Colorful Clouds for Acoustics label. His first full-length release, 1997's Tycho Magnetic Anomaly and the Full Consciousness of Hidden Harmony, released by the Australian Camera Obscura label, was highly regarded for its four extended tracks of drifting, multi-tracked guitar drone and gave birth to a spate of lesser releases and live appearances by a trio formed by DiEmilio with guitarist Jason Knight and drummer Quentin Stolzfus (later of the pop group Mazarin, with whom DiEmilio performed for a short time) who were, at the time, esteemed contemporaries of Philadelphia natives Bardo Pond as well as Windy and Carl and Flying Saucer Attack. A live CD titled The Result Dies With the Worker resulted from these shows.

His second full-length, a double-CD released a year after Tycho Magnetic Anomaly and titled America is Dreaming of Universal String Theory, was a tumultuous, sprawling and despairing set of tracks which were closer to noise music than the drifting ambient music of Tycho Anomaly. Few of his initial fans stuck by him for his 2001 swan song The Highway's Jammed With Broken Heroes, released by the Belgian K-raa-k label, consisting of two grim tracks of seemingly malfunctioning equipment and digital noise.

Between major releases, DiEmilio issued dozens of tracks, most of them recorded quickly and titled for personal obsession ("The United States Investment in Foreign Countries," was one "For Claudia Cardinale," in tribute to a 60s Italian actress was another, while other paid tribute to his musical heroes like the Velvet Underground, the Smiths, Belle and Sebastian, and Wayne Rogers of Crystalized Movements and numerous other psychedelic bands on his own Twisted Village imprint). He also released CDs on Colorful Clouds by musicians Tranquil, Omit, K-Group, Michael J. Schumacher and Ian Nagoski and another, never clearly defined project, the Spires of Oxford and founded the Victoria imprint which released one disc, the debut by Mazarin, and co-founded the Dance Chromatic imprint which also saw only one eponymous art-gabber release.

On November 1, 2006, DiEmilio's suicide was reported by Pitchfork Media. Many other music web sites noted his death. He had suffered from tinnitus and hyperacusis (extreme sensitivity to sound) for several years, as well as from depression. He was living and working in New York City at the time. His story was told in more detail in a piece entitled "Noise Kills: When Everyday Sound Becomes Torture," published in BuzzFeed.

== Selected discography ==
- Fall/Meander (Colorful Clouds for Acoustics),7" 1996
- Two Projects to Harness The Surge of the Tides (Astro Lanes/Colorful Clouds for Acoustics), 7" 1997
- Resonating Subtleties (Shrimper), cass 1995
- Tycho Magnetic Anomaly and the Full Consciousness of Hidden Harmony (Camera Obscura), CD 1997
- Jacques Offenbach's Opera Efforts EP (Amish), 12" EP 1998
- America Is Dreaming of Universal String Theory (Colorful Clouds for Acoustics), 2CD 1998
- Result Dies With the Worker (Colorful Clouds for Acoustics / Little Army), CD 1999
- Cheltenham EP10 (Ochre), 10" EP 2001
- Spires of Oxford/Alphane Moon/Our Glassie Azoth Compilation 7'(Oggum Records) Tracks - 1. The Spires Of Oxford "From The Inscription on The Tomb Of The Duchess Of Newcastle in WestMinster Abbey"
- The Highway's Jammed With Broken Heroes (K-raa-k 3), CD 2001
- Where the Sands Turn to Gold (Rocketgirl), CD 2012
