= Goner =

Goner may refer to:

- Goner, Rajasthan, a village in India
- Goner Records, an American independent record label
- "Goner" (song), a song by Twenty One Pilots from the album Blurryface, 2015
- "Goner", a song by Trixie Mattel from the album the Blonde & Pink Albums, 2022
- Goners, an unrealized film project by Joss Whedon
- The Goner, a psychedelic folk rock band from Sweden

== See also ==
- Gonner, a video game
