= Mike Tamburo =

- Also known as: Brother Ong
- Born: Michael Tamburo; March 30, 1977 (age 49); New Kensington, Pennsylvania, U.S.
- Origin: Pittsburgh, Pennsylvania, U.S.
- Genres: Experimental; drone; ambient; American primitive; new age
- Occupations: Musician; composer; educator
- Instruments: Gong; hammered dulcimer; shahi baaja; guitar; autoharp; swarmandal; bells; sound sculptures
- Years active: 1993–present
- Labels: Sounds Eternal; New American Folk Hero; Music Fellowship; Deep Water Acres
- Website: soundseternal.com

Michael Tamburo (born March 30, 1977), also known as Brother Ong, is an American multi-instrumentalist and composer from Pittsburgh, Pennsylvania. He is known for vibration- and overtone-based music performed on gongs, hammered dulcimer, shahi baaja, and other tuned metal and string instruments.

== Early life and career ==
Tamburo was raised in New Kensington in a musical family; his grandfather taught him clarinet, and his father, a trumpet player who later contracted multiple sclerosis, introduced him to artists such as The Beatles and The Velvet Underground. He began performing in 1993 and played in punk bands in Pittsburgh in the 1990s, citing the city's then-active local scene — including Don Caballero, Karl Hendricks, and Hurl — as a formative influence. He subsequently developed interests in gamelan, avant-garde music, and the American primitive guitar tradition associated with John Fahey and Robbie Basho.

In the early part of his solo career, Tamburo was known primarily as a string player, performing on hammered dulcimer, guitar, and the Indian shahi baaja. Beginning in 2005, he committed to extensive touring, undertaking a series of cross-country trips with collaborators including Nick Schillace, Matt McDowell, R. Keenan Lawler, Larkin Grimm, Eric Carbonara, and Ben Reynolds; he estimated having performed approximately 600 shows between 2005 and 2009.

== Musical style and evolution ==
According to a 2021 Relix profile, Tamburo's interest in vibration-based composition stems from an early experience tuning a guitar, when he became absorbed in the rhythmic "beating" patterns produced between two strings of slightly different frequencies. Relix writer John Adamian described Tamburo's mature work as "hypnotic vibration-centric music" marked by glacial pacing and a "slow ascending and descending intervallic logic," noting that despite varied instrumentation a unified style runs across the catalogue.

Tamburo's dulcimer-centred phase culminated in the long-form composition "The Tenth Gate," which he has described as a structurally palindromic piece refined nightly on tour. A live permutation was issued as Another View of the Gate in 2010.

Following the 2009 death of guitarist Jack Rose and his subsequent marriage to Gallina Haralambova, Tamburo stepped back from solo dulcimer touring and adopted the performing name Brother Ong, releasing improvised, devotional music centred on the shahi baaja and informed by his practice of Kundalini yoga. A 2012 review in Terrascope described the Brother Ong album Deep Water Creation as "deeply reflective and positive in its energies," with shahi baaja and chanted vocals producing "a soft pool of notes" and "seventeen minutes of shimmering psychedelic sound."

From the mid-2010s onward, Tamburo focused increasingly on gongs, bells, sound plates, singing bowls, and other tuned-metal instruments, performing concert-length pieces centred on overtones and psychoacoustics. Relix characterised the 2021 album Mike Tamburo Plays Metal as "a deeply meditative wash of gong sounds" in which the listening experience emerges gradually from apparent quiet.

== Touring and live performance ==
Tamburo has toured the United States as a solo artist and with various ensembles, performing in concert halls, galleries, yoga studios, and other non-traditional spaces. He spent most of 2019 on tour, transporting his gong rig by van; his performances typically employ several dozen overtone-rich instruments arranged as an immersive sound environment. Percussion mallet maker Dragonfly Percussion, which produces a signature Mike Tamburo gong mallet, states that he has presented more than 2,000 concerts and workshops since 1994.

== Teaching and other work ==
Tamburo teaches gong technique and sound-based practice in person and online through School of Gong, and is part of the ethnomusicology trio Dig Deeper with Mitch Nur and Thomas Orr Anderson. He has also taught Kundalini yoga, Nāda yoga, and experimental instrument building. He runs the independent record labels Sounds Eternal and New American Folk Hero, which have issued most of his own recordings.

Dragonfly Percussion manufactures several signature Mike Tamburo gong mallets, designed for gong drone work and close-to-the-instrument playing.

== Discography ==
=== Solo (as Mike Tamburo) ===
- Forever Ago Forever To Go (Sounds Eternal, 2026)
- The Heavy Music (Sounds Eternal, 2025)
- When I'm Gone Bury Me at Sea (Sounds Eternal, 2025)
- Drifts and Nods (Sounds Eternal, 2025)
- Sonic Visions (Sounds Eternal, 2024)
- The Giant Sleeps (Sounds Eternal, 2023)
- Private Humors (Sounds Eternal, 2022)
- Mike Tamburo Plays Metal (Sounds Eternal, 2021)
- The Forever Lights (Sounds Eternal, 2020)
- Fantastic Tales (Sounds Eternal, 2020)
- The Great Unraveling (Sounds Eternal, 2019)
- World of Sound (Sounds Eternal, 2018)
- The Way to Be Free (Sounds Eternal, 2015)
- Lives On Air (Sounds Eternal, 2012)
- Another View of the Gate (Perhaps Transparent, 2010)
- The Tenth Gate and Other Revelations (New American Folk Hero, 2009)
- In the District of Noise (New American Folk Hero, 2009)
- The Tenth Gate / Alchemical Marriage (New American Folk Hero, 2009)
- Vitvivatora (New American Folk Hero, 2008)
- Language of the Birds and Other Fantasies (New American Folk Hero, 2007)
- Dance Enis Dance (Barl Fire, 2007)
- Ghosts of Marumbey (Music Fellowship, 2006)
- Beating of the Rewound Son (Music Fellowship, 2005)
- Screwing Six Bolts Into Last Tuesday (New American Folk Hero, 2005)
- Jade Is the Color of My True Love's Fate (New American Folk Hero, 2005)

=== As Brother Ong ===
- 9th Church of the Ascended Astronaut (Sounds Eternal, 2013)
- Aquarian Summer (Sounds Eternal, 2013)
- Deep Water Creation (Deep Water Acres, 2012)
- Mysteries of the Shahi Baaja (Sounds Eternal, 2012)
- Elenin (Sounds Eternal, 2012)
- The Architect (Sounds Eternal, 2012)
- The Golden Ray (New American Folk Hero / Sounds Eternal, 2011)

=== With Crown of Eternity (with Galina Haralambova) ===
- Vibrate the Cosmos (Sounds Eternal, 2014)
- Earth in Space – Sacred Gong Meditation (Sounds Eternal, 2014)
- Dream Architecture (Sounds Eternal, 2016)
- Universal Hum (Sounds Eternal, 2018)
- When the Music's On (Sounds Eternal)

=== With Psychic Frost (with Matt McDowell) ===
- Taking Lizard Mountain (By Frequency) (Deep Water Acres, 2013)
- Hey Enis Dance / Taste the Frost (Deep Water Acres, 2011)
- Are We Not Drawn Onward to New Era? (Sloow Tapes, 2007)
- At Bohemian Grove (Rural Faune, 2007)
- Searching for Augie Leonard Sr. (New American Folk Hero, 2006)

=== With Arco Flute Foundation ===
- Everything After Everything After the Bomb Is Sci-Fi (Music Fellowship, 2005)
- Everything After the Bomb Is Sci-Fi (Cenotaph Audio, 2002)
- The Third Lesson in New Era Time (Cenotaph Audio, 2000)

=== With Meisha ===
- For Sayas (New American Folk Hero, 2005)
- The Secret of Paul Grouper (New American Folk Hero, 2005)
- Meisha Returns Meisha Forever (Music Fellowship, 1999)
- Meisha (Gingkoba, 1997)
