= Drawing of Sound =

Studio album by Windy & Carl
- Released: March 1996
- Recorded: October 1994 – November 1995
- Studio: Windy & Carl's home; Sound on Sound (Walled Lake, Michigan)
- Genre: Ambient
- Length: 42:56
- Label: Blue Flea; Icon

Windy & Carl chronology
Portal (1994)	Drawing of Sound (1996)	Antarctica: The Bliss Out, Vol. 2 (1997)

Professional ratings
Review scores
Source	Rating
AllMusic	4/5 stars

Drawing of Sound is the second studio album by American musical duo Windy & Carl. It was released in March 1996 by the duo's own record label Blue Flea (on LP), and the following month by the label Icon (on CD).

== Track listing ==
All tracks are written by Carl Hultgren and Windy Weber.

No.	Title	Length
1.	"You"	4:38
2.	"Lighthouse"	9:03
3.	"Venice"	8:22
4.	"Awhile"	10:10
5.	"Whisper"	10:43
Total length:		42:56

== Personnel ==
Credits are adapted from the album's liner notes.

- Windy & Carl (Windy Weber and Carl Hultgren) – music, mixing, recording
- Matt Gasper – artwork
- Jay Kuehn – mixing, recording
