= Urdog =

Urdog are an experimental psychedelic and progressive rock band from Providence, Rhode Island. The band consists of David Lifrieri (guitar, vocals), Jeff Knoch (moog, vocals) and Erin Rosenthal (drums, vocals).

As of their set at Terrastock 6 in Providence (April, 2006), Urdog are on an indefinite hiatus.

== Discography ==
- Urdog, June 2003, self-released
- Garden of Bones, July 2004, Secret Eye
- Eyelid of Moon, April 2005, Secret Eye
- Danger on the Edge of Town, 2006, self-released

=== Compilations ===
- Neighborhood Contributor, 2003, MassDist
- Invisible Pyramid: Elegy Box, September 2005, Last Visible Dog
