= Antarctica: The Bliss Out, Vol. 2 =

Studio album by Windy & Carl
- Released: February 1997
- Genre: Ambient; drone; shoegaze
- Length: 41:03
- Label: Darla

Windy & Carl chronology
Drawing of Sound (1996)	Antarctica: The Bliss Out, Vol. 2 (1997)	Depths (1998)

Antarctica: The Bliss Out, Vol. 2 is the third studio album by American musical duo Windy & Carl. It was released in February 1997 by Darla Records as the second entry in the label's Bliss Out series of ambient records.

The artwork for the album was designed by Seth Robson.

== Critical reception ==
Professional ratings
Review scores
Source	Rating
AllMusic	3/5 stars
Pitchfork	9.5/10

In 2016, Pitchfork ranked Antarctica: The Bliss Out, Vol. 2 at number 39 on its list of the 50 best shoegaze albums of all time.

== Track listing ==
All tracks are written by Carl Hultgren and Windy Weber.

No.	Title	Length
1.	"Antarctica"	22:06
2.	"Traveling"	10:24
3.	"Sunrise"	8:33
Total length:		41:03
