= Portal (album) =

Studio album by Windy & Carl
- Released: November 1994
- Genres: Ambient, drone, space rock
- Length: 72:37

Windy & Carl chronology
Portal (1994)	Drawing of Sound (1996)

Professional ratings
Review scores
Source	Rating
AllMusic	2.5/5 stars

Portal is the debut album of Windy & Carl, self-released in November, 1994.

== Track listing ==
All tracks are written by Carl Hultgren and Windy Weber.

No.	Title	Length
1.	"Preparation"	7:09
2.	"Awhile" (reprise)	2:11
3.	"Ode to Spaceman"	6:12
4.	"Firebursts"	4:11
5.	"Sound Ignition"	5:14
6.	"Approach/Descend"	4:54
7.	"Exploration"	5:45
8.	"Departure"	3:24
9.	"Glowing/Colorful"	14:05
10.	"Gravital Loft"	7:24
11.	"Through the Portal"	12:20

== Personnel ==
Musicians

- Carl Hultgren – guitar, keyboards, percussion
- Windy Weber – bass guitar, vocals

Production and additional personnel

- Ligia Bouton – painting
- Jacques Cohen – assistant engineering, mastering
- Brenda Markovich – chimes on "Awhile (Reprise)"
- Randall Nieman – guitar on "Awhile (Reprise)"
