= Hayley Thompson-King =

American singer-songwriter

- Performing in Somerville, MA, 2022

Background information
- Years active: c. 2009–present

Hayley Thompson-King (born May 4, 1979) is an American singer and songwriter from Sebastian, Florida. In addition to her solo work, she was the songwriter and front-woman of the band Banditas (2009-2012) and the vocalist for the band Major Stars (2011-2016). A trained opera singer, Thompson-King's music incorporates experimental, Americana, rock, and classical elements. AmericanaUK has described the singer as "a voice that can do anything, doing just what it wants," and PopMatters has praised her work as "an explosive display of vocal prowess."

Thompson-King released her first album, Save The Rats, in 2012 on her own label Hard To Kill Records. Recorded with her band Banditas at Sonelab in Easthampton, MA, the album was produced by Margaret Garrett from Mr. Airplane Man and recorded entirely to tape. The album contains the songs "Shame, Shame, Shame" and "Mine To Lose" which both appeared in the film Diary of A Teenage Girl (2015).

Her second album, Psychotic Melancholia (Hard To Kill Records, 2017) was produced by Pete Weiss who also splits lead guitar playing with Thompson-King. The album personnel also includes bassist Chris Maclachlan from Human Sexual Response and drummer Jonathan Ulman. Psychotic Melancholia reached #55 on the Americana Radio Albums Chart and #35 on the Roots Music Report's Top 50 Rock Song Chart. Paste called the record " a positively jaw-dropping exposition that celebrates the entire canon of rock ‘n’ roll’s energy, and should be considered an upping of the ante on the gritty sonic real estate of garage, punk, country, and Americana"

Thompson-King's most recent album, Sororicide (Hard To Kill Records) was delayed due to the Covid-19 pandemic, but finally released on October 2, 2020. The album was produced by Sean Slade and engineered by Benny Grotto.

== Early life ==
Thompson-King grew up in Sebastian, Florida, where her father was a horse trainer. She rode and showed American Quarter Horses competitively from age 8 until she graduated from high school. After graduating from high school, she moved to New York City and studied classical music at New York University. She went on to earn a master's degree in Opera from the New England Conservatory of Music. In addition to her artistic work, she currently teaches at Berklee College of Music in Boston, MA where she is an associate professor in the Voice Department.

She was nominated for the Boston Music Award for Country Artist of The Year in 2018 and 2020.

== Albums ==
- Sororicide (2020)
- Psychotic Melancholia (2017)
- Save The Rats (2012)

with Major Stars

- Motion Set (2016)
- Decibels of Gratitude (2012)
