= Black Sun Ensemble =

Black Sun Ensemble is a Tucson, Arizona, US–based psychedelic rock band, led by Jesus Acedo that was formed in the mid-1980s. The initial albums garnered rave reviews from Rolling Stone and several of the independent music journals of the time. Black Sun Ensemble opened for Camper Van Beethoven on the Key Lime Pie tour in 1989 across North America.

In the mid-1990s, existing copies of earlier records were selling for high prices on eBay. This and a newfound muse inspired Jesus Acedo to re-form the band and create a string of successful new albums, many released on the Camera Obscura label. The re-formed band's albums had great reviews and they performed for several years at the South by Southwest festival in Austin, Texas.

Black Sun Ensemble was an innovative band that inspired the popularity of styles such as freak folk, progressive psychedelic rock and psychedelic folk.

Jesus Acedo died on March 3, 2013, just over two months after his 50th birthday.

== Discography ==
- Black Sun Ensemble (1985)
- The Fish Album (1988)
- Lambent Flame (1989)
- Tragic Magic (1990)
- Elemental Forces (1991)
- Psycho Master El (1994)
- Hymn of the Master (2002)
- "Live at KXCI" (2002)
- Starlight (2003)
- Live at KXCI vol. 2 (2005)
- Bolt of Apollo (2006)
- Across the Sea of Id: The Way to Eden (2008)
