= Deep Water Acres =

Deep Water Acres is a US-based independent webzine and record label dedicated to experimental music. Originally a physical magazine called Deep Water, the Internet publication features musical commentaries, reviews, artist profiles and interviews as well as Australian campfire recipes. Since 2005, Deep Water also operates as an independent record label under the name Deep Water Sonic Productions. The label has so far released over 40 full-length CDs of experimental music, covering acts such as Ashtray Navigations, Agitated Radio Pilot, United Bible Studies, Niagara Falls, The Goner, Evening Fires, Heavy Winged, Brother Ong, Dead Sea Apes and Alligator Crystal Moth.

== Releases ==
Catalogue number	Artist	Release title	Format	Release date
DW001	The Clear Spots	Mountain Rock	CD	2006
DW002	The Clear Spots	Mansion In The Sky	CD	2005
DW003	Adam Bugaj	Wave Of Tears	CD	2005
DW004	Ajilvsga	Blood Nocturnes	CD	2006
DW005	The Clear Spots	Electricity For All	CD	2005
DW006	Heavy Winged	Echoes Of Silence	CD	2006
DW007	Niagara Falls / The Clear Spots	Plays Spiral Isles / Smokehouse Debris	CD	2006
DW008	Alligator Crystal Moth	Bones Of The Great Divide	CD	2007
DW009	Evening Fires	Evening Fires	CD	2006
DW010	Flying Sutra	Levitate And Dissolve	CD	2007
DW011	Anvil Salute	This Is The Voice Of Doom Calling	CD	2007
DW012	Pefkin / The Circle And The Point	Sunblinded Visions By A Silver Sea / Say Goodnight To The Evangelist	CD	2008
DW013	indoorpark	The Neutral Mile	CD	2008
DW014	United Bible Studies	Airs of Sun and Stone	CD	2008
DW015	Agitated Radio Pilot	The Rural Arcane	CD	2008
DW016	The Qoast / Century Plants	Split	CD	2008
DW017	Evening Fires	Blue Mountain Water	CD	2008
DW018	Ashtray Navigations	Sugar Head Record	CD	2009
DW019	The Goner	HH	CD	2009
DW020	Evening Fires	New Worlds For Old	CD	2009
DW021	Flying Sutra	Glowering And Glowing Red	CD	2009
DW022	Enfer Boréal / the.bricoleur / Tuscarora Borealis	Spiritual Machine	CD	2009
DW023	Evening Fires	Waves In The Air	CD	2009
DW024	The Goner	Behold A New Traveler	CD	2010
DW025	Evening Fires	The Book Of Wonders	CD	2010
DW026	Adam Bugaj	Telegraphed	CD	2010
DW027	Enumclaw	Painted Valley of the Mineral Monks	CD	2010
DW028	Evening Fires	Medicine Man International	CD	2010
DW029	Psychic Frost	Psychic Frost	CD	2011
DW030	Evening Fires	Holy Ghost Explosion	CD	2011
DW031	Brother Ong	Deep Water Creation	CD	2011
DW032	Evening Fires	After the End of the World	CD	2011
DW033	Dead Sea Apes	Lupus	CD	2012
DW034	Evening Fires	Flora and Fauna	CD	2012
DW035	Anvil Salute	Black Bear Rug	CD	2012
DW036	Stone Breath	The Snow-White Ghost-White Stag	CD	2012
DW037	Brother Ong	Deep Water Vibration	CD	2012
DW038	Evening Fires	Light from on High	CD	2013
DW039	Psychic Frost	Taking Lizard Mountain (by Frequency)	CD	2013
DW040	Raising Holy Sparks	A Mendicant Hymnal	CD	2013
DW041	Pairdown	Aesthetic Guitar	CD	2013
DW042	Evening Fires	Live Spirits	CD	2014
DW043	E GONE	All the Suns of the Earth	CD	2013
DW044	Evening Fires	Incredible Adventures	CD	2015
DW045	United Bible Studies	So As To Preserve The Mystery	CD	2015
DW046	Prana Crafter	Rupture of Planes	CD	2015
DW047	E GONE	Advice to Hill Walkers	CD	2016
DW052	Primordial Undermind	An Imaginal Abydos	LP	2022
