= Magic Hour (band) =

American psychedelic rock band

- Origin: Greater Boston, Massachusetts, USA
- Genres: Psychedelic rock
- Years active: 1993–1996, 1997, 2000
- Labels: Che Records; Twisted Village
- Past members: Wayne Rogers; Kate Biggar; Naomi Yang; Damon Krukowski

Magic Hour were an American psychedelic rock band from greater Boston, Massachusetts, USA and were made up of former Crystalized Movements members Wayne Rogers and Kate Biggar and former Galaxie 500 members Damon Krukowski and Naomi Yang.

== History ==
In 1993, Rogers and Biggar asked Krukowski and Yang to replace the recently departed rhythm section of Crystalized Movements. After the new quartet's first rehearsal, it was decided they should form a new band rather than carrying on as Crystalized Movements.

They went on to record three albums and toured Europe and the US before splitting up in 1996. Damon & Naomi returned to working as a duo, while Wayne and Kate formed Major Stars. The four members reformed for a one-off performance at the first Terrastock festival in 1997. They also reformed for the fourth Terrastock festival, where they performed as Children of the Rainbow, a tribute to the band MU.

== Discography ==
- Heads Down (7" - 1993 - Twisted Village)
- No Excess is Absurd (CD/LP - 1994 - Ché Records, Twisted Village)
- I Had A Thought (7" - 1994 - Ché Records)
- After Tomorrow (10" - 1994 - Ché Records)
- Will They Turn You On or Will They Turn On You (CD/LP - 1995 - Ché Records, Twisted Village)
- Sunrise Variations (track on Succour CD compilation - Ptolemaic Terrascope 1995)
- Secession96 (CD - 1996 - Twisted Village)
- Sunset Variations (track on Audible Rumbles CD compilation - Ptolemaic Terrascope 1996)
- Magic Moments (Digital - 2016 - Twisted Village) - compilation of tracks previously released on singles, compilations, or fanzine giveaways
