= Heavy Winged =

American drone metal trio

- Origin: Brooklyn, New York, New York, United States
- Genres: Drone, drone metal, sludge metal, black metal, stoner metal, noise, noise rock, experimental rock, post-rock, space rock, stoner rock, neo-psychedelia, ambient
- Years active: 2004-present
- Labels: Three Lobed, Type Records, Deep Water Acres
- Members: Ryan Hebert; Jed Bindeman; Brady Sansone
- Website: www.myspace.com/heavywinged

Heavy Winged is an American drone metal trio from Brooklyn, New York. Their sound has been compared to Boris, Dead C and Bardo Pond. Their music has been released by Three Lobed Recordings, Type Records and Deep Water Acres. The band, comprising guitarist Ryan Hebert, drummer Jed Bindeman, and bassist Brady Sansone, built their early catalog through a prolific output of cassettes, vinyl, and CD-Rs on labels including Not Not Fun, Digitalis, and Aurora Borealis, recordings characterized by harsh guitar tones and a raw, low fidelity aesthetic. Their 2010 album Fields Within Fields, recorded at 5D Studios in Brooklyn, marked a departure toward higher fidelity production and was reviewed by Pitchfork. Their Sunspotted (2010), released on Type Records, was described by the label as combining the sheet-noise of Yellow Swans with the harmonic approach of early Mogwai and Sonic Youth.

== Partial discography ==
- Heavy Winged / Taiga Remains – Split (2006)
- Taking the Veil (2006)
- Echoes of Silence (2006)
- Hunting the Moon (2006)
- A Serpent's Lust (2006)
- Heavy Winged / Taiga Remains – Heavy Winged / Taiga Remains – Split (2007)
- Ashtray Navigations / Cold Solemn Rites in the Sun / Heavy Winged – Split (2007)
- Feel Inside (2007)
- We Grow (2007)
- Alive in My Mouth (2008)
- Windy & Carl / Heavy Winged – Split (2008)
- The Thinner the Air (2009)
- Heavy Winged + Inca Ore – Ring Mining (2009)
- Waking, Shaking (2009)
- Spreading Center (2009)
- Sunspotted (2010)
- Fields Within Fields (2010)
