= Grimble Grumble =

- Origin: Chicago, Illinois, United States
- Genres: Psychedelic rock Shoegaze; Noise
- Years active: 1995–2000, 2004–present

Grimble Grumble is an American psychedelic rock band from Chicago, Illinois.

== History ==
Grimble Grumble formed in 1995, taking their name from a character mentioned in the Pink Floyd song "The Gnome". Prior to this, bassist Christine Garcia and guitarist Reuben Rios had been playing together in South Chicago's Slag Valley since they were teenagers in the late 1980s. The group's first release was a split 7-inch record with The Azusa Plane in 1996, and several more singles and EPs followed in the late 1990s. A self-titled compilation of two of the band's EPs was released in 2000, shortly before the group went on hiatus.

In 2004, Grimble Grumble regrouped to record Leaves Leader, which would be their last recording for seven years. The group toured intermittently until 2011's September Sun. A tour of the United States followed in 2012.

== Members ==
Current members

- Christine Garcia – vocals, bass (1995–present)
- Saleem Dhamee – guitar (1996–present)
- Mike Bulington – percussion (1996–present)
- Josh Hudson – guitar (2000–present)

Former members

- Reuben Rios – guitar, Moog, sound effects (founder, 1995–2000)
- Paul Garcia – drums (1995–1996)
- Michael Jalovecky – guitar (1995–2000)

== Discography ==
Albums

- Grimble Grumble (Won't Go Flat Records, 1997)
- Grimble Grumble (The Bouncing Corporation, 2000)
- Leaves Leader (Pehr Records, 2004)
- September Sun (Slow Fizz, 2011)

EPs

- Grimble Grumble (Burnt Hair, 1997)
- Sad (The Bouncing Corporation, 2000)
- Sad (JellyFant, 2002)

Singles

- "Second Mind" (split with The Azusa Plane) (Enraptured, 1997)
- "Enraptured Yuletide" (split with Windy & Carl) (Enraptured, 1997)
- "Fucked in the Head" (Amberley, 1998)
- "Senseless" (AudioInformationPhenomena, 1999)

Compilations

- ”UFOs and Visitations” (recorded by Rios and released as UHR vs Grimble Grimble) (Ochre Records, 1999)
- ”Discovering the Stars” (recorded by Rios and released as UHR vs Grimble Grimble) (Ochre Records, 1999)
- “Gossip, Numbers and Theories” (CD Baby, 2004)
- “Rail Road” (Pehr, 2004)
- “Dose Lied” (Ptolemaic Terrascope, 2005)
- “Make Believe Song” (Picture in My Ear, 2016)
- "Odyssey and Oracle (Third Man Records, 2022)
