= Depths (Windy & Carl album) =

Studio album by Windy & Carl
- Released: March 23, 1998
- Genre: Ambient; drone
- Length: 70:01
- Label: Kranky

Windy & Carl chronology
Antarctica: The Bliss Out, Vol. 2 (1997)	Depths (1998)	Consciousness (2001)

Depths is the fourth studio album by American musical duo Windy & Carl. It was released on March 23, 1998 by the record label Kranky.

== Critical reception ==
Professional ratings
Review scores
Source	Rating
AllMusic	4/5 stars
Pitchfork	9.3/10

Pitchfork ranked Depths as the 36th best ambient album of all time in 2016; in an accompanying essay, Mark Richardson cited it as "a peak" in Windy & Carl's "run of classic drone records" on the Kranky label. Two years later, Pitchfork listed Depths as the 49th best album of 1998.

== Track listing ==
All tracks are written by Carl Hultgren and Windy Weber.

No.	Title	Length
1.	"Sirens"	7:06
2.	"Undercurrent"	4:41
3.	"Set Adrift"	6:35
4.	"Depths"	19:02
5.	"The Silent Ocean"	3:35
6.	"Aquatica"	15:45
7.	"Surfacing"	13:17
Total length:		70:01

== Personnel ==
Credits are adapted from the album's liner notes.

- Windy & Carl (Windy Weber and Carl Hultgren) – music
- Jody Helme – front cover and inside back cover photography
- Brenda Markovich – back cover photography
- Eric Pieti – inside photography
