= Fighting 2 Quarters and a Nickel =

Live album by Rake.
- Released: 1998
- Recorded: January 10, 1993 – April 12, 1997
- Genre: Experimental rock
- Length: 145:36
- Label: VHF
- Producer: Rake.

Rake. chronology
G-Man (1996)	Fighting 2 Quarters and a Nickel (1998)	Resume the Cosmos (1998)

Professional ratings
Review scores
Source	Rating
Allmusic	3/5 stars

Fighting 2 Quarters and a Nickel is a live performance album by Rake., released in 1998 through VHF Records. The front cover photograph and design is a direct reference to the 1978 album Heavy Organ by organist Virgil Fox.

== Track listing ==
All music is composed by Rake.

Disc one
No.	Title	Length
1.	"Milk Bar, Philadelphia, PA 4.7.95"	4:44
2.	"Black Cat, Washington, DC 9.7.95"	32:05
3.	"Duke University Coffeehouse, Durham, NC 2.3.95"	6:25
4.	"9:30 Club, Washington, DC 8.23.94"	1:51
5.	"9:30 Club, Washington, DC 8.4.95"	15:31
6.	"Hole in the Wall, Richmond, VA 4.27.96"	11:56

Disc two
No.	Title	Length
1.	"Duke University Coffeehouse, Durham, NC 2.3.95"	0:32
2.	"Klang Festival, Richmond, VA 7.30.94"	4:38
3.	"Duke University Coffeehouse, Durham, NC 2.3.95"	5:59
4.	"Here Art Gallery, New York, NY 1.10.93"	2:55
5.	"Northern Virginia Community College Mail Art Show, Annandale, VA 12.4.95"	3:50
6.	"Black Cat, Washington, DC 1.10.94"	3:15
7.	"9:30 Club, Washington, DC 5.27.94"	12:35
8.	"Tommy's Warehouse, Richmond, VA 4.12.97"	35:00
9.	"9:30 Club, Washington, DC 8.4.95 / Margaret's Café, Chapel Hill, NC 3.9.93"	4:20

== Personnel ==
Adapted from the Fighting 2 Quarters and a Nickel liner notes.

Rake.

- Jim Ayre – electric guitar, vocals
- Bill Kellum – bass guitar
- Carl Moller – drums, saxophone

== Release history ==
Region	Date	Label	Format	Catalog
United States	1998	VHF	CD	VHF#33
