= G-Man (Rake album) =

Studio album by Rake
- Released: 1996
- Genre: Experimental rock
- Length: 77:57
- Label: Squealer
- Producer: Rake.

Rake chronology
The Art Ensemble of Rake/The Tell-Tale Moog (1995)	G-Man (1996)	Fighting 2 Quarters and a Nickel (1998)

Professional ratings
Review scores
Source	Rating
Allmusic	2/5 stars

G-Man is the third studio album by Rake, released in 1996 by Squealer.

== Track listing ==
All music is composed by Rake.

No.	Title	Length
1.	"10,000Killahutrz Tone"	1:45
2.	"Punkrock Glo"	7:30
3.	"Chair Throwing Incident"	20:56
4.	"B.D.B."	9:27
5.	"Postscript.drv"	11:54
6.	"Filter Touch"	0:38
7.	"Andy Bass"	6:14
8.	"Chesterfield Nights"	5:56
9.	"The Cosmos at Large"	10:49
10.	"Eric Blood Axe Rules OK"	2:48

== Personnel ==
Adapted from the G-Man liner notes.

Rake.

- Jim Ayre – electric guitar, vocals
- Bill Kellum – bass guitar
- Carl Moller – drums, saxophone

== Release history ==
Region	Date	Label	Format	Catalog
United States	1996	Squealer	CD	SQLR-021
