= Rake Is My Co-Pilot =

Studio album by Rake.
- Released: 1994
- Genre: Experimental rock
- Length: 45:08
- Label: VHF
- Producer: Rake.

Rake. chronology
Rake Is My Co-Pilot (1994)	The Art Ensemble of Rake/The Tell-Tale Moog (1995)

Rake Is My Co-Pilot is the debut album of Rake., released in 1993 by VHF Records. It contains two lengthy improvisations, one on each side of the vinyl.

== Track listing ==
All music is composed by Rake.

Side one
No.	Title	Length
1.	"Thin the Herd"	21:30

Side two
No.	Title	Length
1.	"Motorcycle Shoes"	23:38

== Personnel ==
Adapted from the Rake Is My Co-Pilot liner notes.

Rake.

- Jim Ayre – electric guitar, vocals
- Bill Kellum – bass guitar
- Carl Moller – drums, saxophone

== Release history ==
Region	Date	Label	Format	Catalog
United States	1994	VHF	LP	VHF#13
