= Abunai! =

American psychedelic rock band

- Origin: Brighton, Massachusetts, United States
- Genres: Psychedelic rock, space rock, folk rock
- Years active: 1996 – 2002, 2006 – present
- Label: Camera Obscura
- Members: Dan Parmenter; Brendan Quinn; Kris Thompson; Joe Turner

Abunai! was an American rock band from Boston, Massachusetts, United States primarily active from 1996 to 2001 on the Australian Camera Obscura record label.

== History ==
The band formed in 1996 after the four members began performing extended improvisational sessions. Though the band members played a variety of different instruments and all provided various vocals, the general live performance lineup was Dan Parmenter on bass, Brendan Quinn on guitar, Kris Thompson on keyboards and Joe Turner on drums. The name Abunai is Japanese in origin and translates as 'look out!' or 'watch out!'

Due to musical and writing connections to the Ptolemaic Terrascope the band was asked to play the first Terrastock festival in Providence, Rhode Island in 1997, where they also sold copies of a self-released and titled cassette taken from their initial sessions. Tony Dale, who had founded the Camera Obscura label the previous year, was in attendance for their set and offered to release the group's material. Abunai! remained with the label for its subsequent three albums and two EPs, though the band also released songs on a variety of compilations elsewhere.

The band's debut release, Universal Mind Decoder, appeared later in 1997; the title was a reference to a working title for the Byrds song "Change is Now" from The Notorious Byrd Brothers.

Abunai!'s second release, 1999's The Mystic River Sound, was created and presented as a supposed compilation album covering "the seedy, sour suburbs north of Boston," referencing both numerous album compilations of small psychedelic and rock scenes as well as the Turtles album The Turtles Present the Battle of the Bands. All songs on the album were written and performed by the group, with false group names acting as musical or local in-jokes and references.

The group's final full-length release, 2000's Round Wound, was conceived and presented in the form of a classic Dean Markley Strings package, with the album title written in the company's logo font and the artwork and overall layout similarly parodying the look. Underground cult New England musician Bobb Trimble appeared on the song "Buzz Bombb." Released simultaneously with Round Wound was Deep Mu Flux, an EP on the small Camera Obscura sub-label Camera Lucida which contained three instrumentals.

The members of Abunai! announced in 2001 that the band was on hold for the foreseeable future while the group concentrated on other projects, including Joe Turner's promotion and organizing of the fifth Terrastock festival in Boston in 2002. The final release by Abunai! appeared in 2003; like Deep Mu Flux, Two Brothers was a limited edition EP on Camera Lucida containing two versions of the title track as well as a live recording of "Lord Hampton" from the fourth Terrastock festival in 2000.

Since 2003, the band has played occasional reunion shows, including a 2006 date in Providence, Rhode Island as a part of a preview show for the sixth Terrastock festival and a 2010 show in Boston for the Deep Heaven Now Festival, along with experimenting with so-far unreleased recording sessions. In August 2010 the band made all its releases available for full download for a short period via Bandcamp.

== Band members ==
- Dan Parmenter - bass, vocals, keyboards
- Brendan Quinn - guitar, vocals
- Kris Thompson - organ, vocals
- Joe Turner - drums, guitar, keyboard, vocals

== Special Guests ==
- Scot Campanella - guitar
- Cheryl Wanner - vocals
- Ajda the Turkish Queen - flute
- Mark Dwinnel - guitar (live)
- Nick Saloman - guitar (live)

== Discography ==
=== Full length albums ===
- Universal Mind Decoder (1997)
- Mystic River Sound (1999)
- Round-Wound (2000)

=== EPs ===
- Deep Mu Flux
- Two Brothers
