= Camera Obscura (record label) =

Defunct Australian record label

- Founded: 1996
- Founder: Tony Dale
- Defunct: 2010
- Distributor(s): Carrot Top Records (USA)/Clearspot Distribution (Europe)
- Genre: Psychedelic, post-rock, experimental, alternative rock, folk music
- Country of origin: Australia
- Location: Melbourne
- Official website: http://www.cameraobscura.com.au/

Camera Obscura was a record label founded by Australian music journalist Tony Dale in 1996. Described by Dale as 'a conduit for the release of contemporary acid-folk, psych-pop and space-rock,' the label put out almost ninety releases over fourteen years, the vast majority of which were full-length CDs. Bands and musicians who released material on the label included the Green Pajamas, Patrick Porter, Abunai!, the Azusa Plane, Black Sun Ensemble, Sharron Kraus and Primordial Undermind. Dale formally discontinued the label in 2010, shortly before he died due to cancer.

== History ==
Born in England in 1958 but raised in Australia, Tony Dale was a passionate fan of music from an early age; in a 2003 interview for web publication Perfect Sound Forever he mentioned that 'for a kid in the late 60s/early 70s the radio was pretty good. Lot of classic psych and singer-songwriter stuff, mixed with lot of nifty bubblegum pop hits.' An interest in music continued into later years, with Dale identifying the popularization of the Internet as being key in involving himself first in online discussions and then as a regular writer and journalist for the English-based fanzine Ptolemaic Terrascope.

Dale's writing and on-line discussion led to a variety of contacts which gave him the opportunity to launch Camera Obscura in 1996 in Melbourne, Australia, beginning with the debut album by American acid folk band Stone Breath, Songs of Moonlight and Rain. The label logo initially consisted of a medieval European style illustration of a musician and a camera obscura itself; later versions of the logo featured a detailed illustration simply of a camera obscura. Dale described the inspirations for the label in the 2003 interview:

The Ptolemaic Terrascope for its blending of new and old fandom. I admired the early days of Creation, Flying Nun, and Sub Pop – before they all got corporate. I especially admired Alan McGee's deeply unfashionable (at the time) paisley stance. I wanted to do that. And Xpressway Records – that sort of cottage industry approach unfettered by the need for large budgets or anything other than the sheer joy of getting something I thought to be cool out there. Like record collecting in reverse.

While Camera Obscura most often was identified as a psychedelic label thanks to Dale's writing work and the general association of bands that appeared on the label, especially after the start of the irregular Terrastock festival series which often featured groups that had released work via Camera Obscura, Dale preferred to say it simply reflected his own tastes. While always based in Australia, the vast majority of the label's acts were from North America and Europe, with distribution of releases being handled via other companies in those areas or via direct Internet ordering from the label's website. Nearly all the releases were new recordings for the label, but there were also some reissues, including a CD box set of solo efforts by Green Pajamas bandleader Jeff Kelly and the debut self-titled album from the Black Sun Ensemble, who also released numerous later albums on the label.

All but a handful of physical releases on Camera Obscura were full-length CDs; the exceptions were a small number of vinyl 7" singles and album releases. A small sublabel, Camera Lucida, concentrated on even more limited release runs, offering two CDs and three 7" singles. Releases were catalogued in the order of appearance and by format. The label also made various mp3s available for download from their catalogue; in the label's early years there was an mp3 singles club as well, with selections ending up on the two Serotonin Ronin compilations the label released on CD.

After a steady release schedule for over ten years, which continued following a move by Dale and his family from Melbourne to the Australian countryside, Camera Obscura's pace slowed over time due in large part to Dale's cancer diagnosis and treatment. The label's final formal release was the second album by American band Fell, Incoherent Lullabies, in 2009. In June 2010, Dale ended the label and mail-order operations to coincide with the conclusion of the Australian tax year on 30 June as well as out of consideration for his family; Dale died the following month.

== Artists ==
Many of the bands on Camera Obscura released albums on other labels or were formally signed to other labels at the time of their appearance in the Camera Obscura roster.

- Abunai!
- Alchemysts
- Alphane Moon
- The Azusa Plane
- Bardo Pond
- Black Sun Ensemble
- Black Swan Network
- Dipsomaniacs
- Dunlavy
- Fell
- Alastair Galbraith
- Gentle Tasaday
- Goblin Market
- The Green Pajamas
- Greyscale
- Øyvind Holm
- The Iditarod
- Ink Puddle Compound
- Jeff Kelly
- Christian Kiefer
- Sharron Kraus
- Laconic Chamber
- Lazily Spun
- Lifesmyth
- The Linus Pauling Quartet
- The Lothars
- Love and Death
- Lucky Bishops
- Marianne Nowottny
- Our Glassie Azoth
- The Petals
- Patrick Porter
- Phineas Gage
- Primordial Undermind
- Project Grimm
- Rake
- Rusalnaia
- Saint Joan
- Salamander
- The Sand Pebbles
- Satyrswitch
- Stone Breath
- SubArachnoid Space
- The Tadpoles
- Tanakh
- Joe Turner (solo album from Abunai! member)
- Ultraviolet Makes Me Sick
- United Bible Studies
- Vortex Navigation Co.
