= Windy & Carl =

American space rock group

- Origin: Dearborn, Michigan, U.S.
- Genres: Space rock, ambient, drone, dream pop
- Years active: 1993–present
- Labels: Blue Flea, Burnt Hair, Ba Da Bing!, Icon, Darla, Kranky, Ochre, Geographic North, Rocket Girl, Third Man Records
- Spinoffs: Five Way Mirror
- Members: Carl Hultgren; Windy Weber
- Website: windyandcarl.bandcamp.com

Windy & Carl is an American space rock duo based in Dearborn, Michigan, United States. Cited as "a leading light of the Michigan space-rock scene" by AllMusic, the minimalist group was formed in 1993 by the husband-and-wife duo of guitarist Carl Hultgren and bassist and singer Windy Weber. According to Third Man Records, "[The Detroit space-rock scene] was a modern movement of a more traditional 'space-rock' sound, influenced less by The Stooges and MC5 and more by Spacemen 3, Loop, My Bloody Valentine and krautrock bands like Can and Neu!"

Unlike noteworthy prior drone/ambient artists (such as Cluster, Brian Eno, Popol Vuh, et al.), Windy & Carl's drones are primarily derived from guitar, particularly via usage of delay effects, reverb effects, and E-Bow, rather than synthesizers. Another noteworthy aspect of W&C's sound is the absence of drums.

Windy & Carl have recorded 15 albums and many singles and EPs and continue to perform live. Their latest full-length album, Heavy Early & The Creation of Venus, was released by their own Blue Flea label in 2024.

== History ==
"Hultgren first began recording instrumental guitar drone pieces in 1992, when he self-released a cassette tape named Portal before teaming up with Weber". It was later reissued on CD by BaDaBing owner Ben Goldberg.

Windy & Carl then participated in Darla Records' Bliss Out Series in 1997, contributing the maxi-EP Antarctica. That year, they also issued the limited-edition album/maxi-EP A Dream of Blue on U.K. label Ochre Records, with individually painted cover art by Weber (on the 10" vinyl version). Depths was released by Kranky in early 1998.

Poster for the 1997 Silver Apples/Windy & Carl European tour created by Peg Udall and copyright Whirlybird Records.

In 1997, the duo embarked on a European tour with Silver Apples, visiting England, France, Switzerland, Belgium, Germany, Denmark, Norway, Sweden, and the Netherlands.

In 1999, the couple teamed up with synthesist Greg Gasiorowski to record under the name Five Way Mirror. They released a few singles under that moniker, in addition to Transcendence, a 1999 full-length album. Consciousness came out on Kranky in 2001. The band then went on hiatus (after Weber's mom died), returning with Dream House/ Dedications to Flea in 2005. (Flea was their recently deceased dog.) There was a singles compilation released in 2001, Introspection, which is 3 CDs of singles, live tracks and previously unreleased recordings.

In 2006, they released Akimatsuri, a one track (33:16 min) limited album under their label Blue Flea. It was recorded at their home between March and October 2006. The unique track is made up of 5 subtracks.

Windy & Carl have been a mainstay of the various Terrastock music festivals. In the fall of 2000 they released a CD with The Lothars, titled & Windy & Carl & The Lothars that featured live performances by each band from the San Francisco Terrastock festival as well as a 28-minute collaborative piece recorded at the London Terrastock festival.

The group has issued several other split recordings as well as a 3-CD box set, Introspection: Singles & Rarities 1993-2000. They embarked on a national tour in the summer of 2001 with Landing; the bands released a split tour-only EP to commemorate it. A highlight of this tour was being able to perform a private audience show for Sonic Youth.

In 2007, Windy & Carl joined Mono, Masakatsu Takagi, and Yellow 6 to compose music for the film August Evening, written and directed by Chris Eska.

October 2008 saw the release of Songs for the Broken Hearted – their 4th album in 11 years for Kranky. In December 2008, American webzine Somewhere Cold ranked Songs for the Broken Hearted No. 5 on their 2008 Somewhere Cold Awards Hall of Fame.

Windy & Carl's influence can be heard in bands such as Landing, The Sight Below, Kranky labelmates White Rainbow, Growing, and Yume Bitsu.

After a long hiatus from live performance, they began performing live again in October 2024.

=== Stormy Records ===
In 1999, Hultgren and Weber started a record store in Dearborn called Stormy Records. It shut down in 2021 after 22 years in business.

== Discography ==
=== Albums ===
- Portal (Ba Da Bing!, 1994)
- Drawing of Sound (Icon, 1996)
- Antarctica (Darla, 1997)
- Depths (Kranky, 1998)
- Dream of Blue (Ochre, 1997)
- Consciousness (Kranky, 2001)
- Dedications to Flea (Brainwashed, 2005)
- The Dream House (Kranky, 2005)
- Songs for the Broken Hearted (Kranky, 2008)
- Instrumentals for the Broken Hearted (Blue Flea, 2009)
- We Will Always Be (Kranky, 2012)
- Windy & Carl (4 song mini album, Blue Flea, 2012)
- Blues for a UFO (Blue Flea, 2017)
- Allegiance and Conviction (Kranky, 2020)
- Heavy Early & The Creation of Venus (Blue Flea, 2024)

=== EPs and singles ===
- Watersong/Dragonfly (Blue Flea, 1993)
- Instrumentals EP (Burnt Hair Records, 1994)
- Left Without Air (split single with Füxa) (Blue Flea/Mind Expansion, 1995)
- Green (split single with Hopewell) (Burnt Hair Records, 1996)
- Emeralds/Fragments Of Time And Space (Enraptured, 1996)
- Christmas Song (split single with Grimble Grumble) (Enraptured, 1996)
- Crazy in the Sun (split single with Silver Apples) (Rocket Girl, 1997)
- Dream of Blue/Kate EP (Ochre, 1997)
- Near and Far (split EP with Amp) (Blue Flea, 1998)
- Noises from the Darkroom (split 12" with Saddar Bazaar) (Earworm, 2001)
- Untitled (split tour CD with Landing (Music Fellowship, 2001)
- Akimatsuri (Blue Flea, 2006)
- Intelligence in Evolution (split LP with Heavy Winged) (Music Fellowship, 2008)
- You Can't Hide Your Love Forever vol. 7 (Dwight Yoakam cover) (Geographic North, 2012)
- Calliope/Carnivale (The Great Pop Supplement, 2013)
- I Walked Alone/At Night (Blue Flea, 2014)
- Christmas Song/Snowing (Blue Flea, 2016)
- Godzilla Of Snow/Witch & A Cauldron (Blue Flea, 2016)
- Water Song/Dragonfly - 1993 Instrumental Demos (Blue Flea, 2018)
- Forest Trails (2019)

=== Compilations ===
- Introspection (Blue Flea, 2002) (3 CDs of early singles, rarities, live tracks, etc.)
- Unreleased Home Recordings 1992-1995 (Blue Flea, 2020) (3 CDs of demos and outtakes and a hand-painted art piece by Windy)

=== Live albums ===
- Live In Tucson, AZ (5-31-09) (Blue Flea, 2013)
- Live At Community School Of Music And Arts * Ithaca, NY April 24th 2009 (Blue Flea, 2024)
- Live At 'Under The Couch' Atlanta GA, November 18th 1997 (Blue Flea, 2024)

=== Various-artist compilation appearances ===
- "Beyond Asleep" on Disco Sucks (compilation) (1996)
- "3rd Stage" (live collaboration with The Lothars), "Through the Portal" (live), and "Ballast" (live) on & Windy & Carl & The Lothars (2000)
- "Seiche" on Brainwaves (2006)
- "The ESP of Dandelion Seeds in Hues of Grasshopper" on CULTIVATION - First Edition (Cultivation Collective, 2017)
- "Forest Trails" on Pure Sounds of Michigan (Assemble Sound/State of Michigan, 2019)
- "Instrumental #2" on Southeast of Saturn (Third Man Records, 2020)

=== Solo albums ===
- Windy Weber - I Hate People (Blue Flea, 2008)
- Carl Hultgren - Tomorrow (Blue Flea, 2014)
