= Patrick Porter =

American singer and artist (born 1977)

- Born: Murfreesboro, Tennessee
- Occupation(s): Singer and Artist

Patrick Porter is an American singer/songwriter, novelist, poet, and painter. Born in Murfreesboro, Tennessee, and raised in the isolated mountain town of Bailey, Colorado, Porter began playing music at a young age, often acting as a sit-in drummer for his father's biker bar band.

== Musical career ==
As a teenager Porter began to write his own songs, recording and distributing hundreds of homemade cassettes of wildly varying disposition and sound quality, both on his own and as a member of the hardcore art-punk band Neglected Lawn. Porter's records began to appear internationally after he signed to Camera Obscura, an Australian indie label who released his first proper full-length CD: Reverb Saved My Life (2002) as well as the disc Reconsidered (2001) by shoegazer band Phineas Gage, of which he was a short-term member.

After moving to New York in 2003, Porter recorded a handful of discs:Lisha Kill (Camera Obscura, 2005), Maybe Waltz (Evelyn Records, 2004), and Skylan Mo (Asaurus Records, 2004).

In 2006 Porter signed with Greyday Records, an indie label in Portland Oregon, who released the Die Wandaland LP, in September 2006. The label is also releasing, as two double CDs, the bulk of Porter's work from 2008, a year in which Porter recorded three full-length CDs (A Swan At Smiley's; Cry Me A River, Sing Me A Raft; and Goodbye Pork Pie Heart) as well as an EP (Darlene Evening USA). The first of these discs, combining A Swan At Smiley's and Cry Me A River, Sing Me A Raft was released in April, 2009.

== Poetry ==
Porter is also a poet and novelist. His first book of poetry, The Intrusive Ache of Morning, was published in 2001 by Chicago's Press of the Third Mind. His second, Nervous Halo, was published a year later on the late Paul Dilsaver's Arts and Academic Press. He has also written two novels, Kristallnacht (2001), and Apocalypse Later (2006), as well as a book of short stories called Hemm Haww (2009).

== Painting ==
Porter began painting in the summer of 2006 while living in New York City, selling watercolor/crayon paintings in Union Square Park to make extra money. By the end of the year he was painting full-time and continues to work consistently both through galleries and private commissions.

== Discography ==
- Reverb Saved My Life LP (2002, Camera Obscura)
- Coconut Killers EP (2002, Ostrich)
- Maybe Waltz EP (2004, Evelyn Records; 2007 re-issue, The Time Is Now)
- Skylan Mo LP (2004, Asaurus Records)
- Bittersweet At Best 7-inch EP (2004, Keep Recordings)
- Monsters of Mope Tour EP (2005, Hijacked Records)
- The GE Bootlegs (2005, Ostrich)
- Lisha Kill LP (2005, Camera Obscura)
- Die Wandaland LP (2006, Greyday Records)
- This Machine Kills Bathos LP (2007, The Time Is Now)
- Secret Teta Disaster LP (2007, Nervous Halo)
- A Swan At Smileys (2009, Greyday Records)
- Cry Me A River, Sing Me A Raft (2009, Greyday Records)
- Darlene Evening, USA (2009, Greyday Records)
- Goodbye Pork Pie Heart (2009, Greyday Records)
- Bachelor Pad Blue; Bent Pants And Stray Cats LP (2009, Vacant Songs Records)
