= The Art Ensemble of Rake/The Tell-Tale Moog =

Studio album by Rake.
- Released: 1995
- Genre: Experimental rock
- Length: 141:10
- Label: VHF
- Producer: Rake.

Rake. chronology
Rake Is My Co-Pilot (1994)	The Art Ensemble of Rake/The Tell-Tale Moog (1995)	G-Man (1996)

The Art Ensemble of Rake/The Tell-Tale Moog is the second studio album by Rake., released in 1995 by VHF Records.

== Track listing ==
All music is composed by Rake.

Disc one – The Art Ensemble of Rake
No.	Title	Length
1.	"M.B. Theme"	0:53
2.	"Klang Co."	19:55
3.	"Remote Sensing"	12:33
4.	"Helio-Moog"	23:53
5.	"Quadrablenders"	8:01
6.	"M.B. Theme" (live)	1:46

Disc two – The Tell-Tale Moog
No.	Title	Length
1.	"[untitled]"	1:00
2.	"[untitled]"	1:00
3.	"[untitled]"	1:00
4.	"[untitled]"	1:00
5.	"[untitled]"	1:00
6.	"[untitled]"	1:00
7.	"[untitled]"	1:00
8.	"[untitled]"	1:00
9.	"[untitled]"	1:00
10.	"[untitled]"	0:08
11.	"[untitled]"	1:00
12.	"[untitled]"	1:00
13.	"[untitled]"	1:00
14.	"[untitled]"	1:00
15.	"[untitled]"	1:00
16.	"[untitled]"	1:00
17.	"[untitled]"	1:00
18.	"[untitled]"	1:00
19.	"[untitled]"	1:00
20.	"[untitled]"	1:00
21.	"[untitled]"	1:00
22.	"[untitled]"	1:00
23.	"[untitled]"	1:00
24.	"[untitled]"	1:00
25.	"[untitled]"	1:00
26.	"[untitled]"	1:00
27.	"[untitled]"	1:00
28.	"[untitled]"	1:00
29.	"[untitled]"	1:00
30.	"[untitled]"	1:00
31.	"[untitled]"	1:00
32.	"[untitled]"	1:00
33.	"[untitled]"	1:00
34.	"[untitled]"	1:00
35.	"[untitled]"	1:00
36.	"[untitled]"	1:00
37.	"[untitled]"	1:00
38.	"[untitled]"	1:00
39.	"[untitled]"	1:00
40.	"[untitled]"	1:00
41.	"[untitled]"	1:00
42.	"[untitled]"	1:00
43.	"[untitled]"	1:00
44.	"[untitled]"	1:00
45.	"[untitled]"	1:00
46.	"[untitled]"	1:00
47.	"[untitled]"	1:00
48.	"[untitled]"	1:00
49.	"[untitled]"	1:00
50.	"[untitled]"	1:00
51.	"[untitled]"	1:00
52.	"[untitled]"	1:00
53.	"[untitled]"	1:00
54.	"[untitled]"	1:00
55.	"[untitled]"	1:00
56.	"[untitled]"	1:00
57.	"[untitled]"	1:00
58.	"[untitled]"	1:00
59.	"[untitled]"	1:00
60.	"[untitled]"	1:00
61.	"[untitled]"	1:00
62.	"[untitled]"	1:00
63.	"[untitled]"	1:00
64.	"[untitled]"	1:00
65.	"[untitled]"	1:00
66.	"[untitled]"	1:00
67.	"[untitled]"	1:00
68.	"[untitled]"	1:00
69.	"[untitled]"	1:00
70.	"[untitled]"	1:00
71.	"[untitled]"	1:00
72.	"[untitled]"	1:00
73.	"[untitled]"	1:00
74.	"[untitled]"	1:00
75.	"[untitled]"	0:54

== Personnel ==
Adapted from The Art Ensemble of Rake/The Tell-Tale Moog liner notes.

Rake.

- Jim Ayre – electric guitar, vocals
- Bill Kellum – bass guitar
- Carl Moller – drums, saxophone

== Release history ==
Region	Date	Label	Format	Catalog
United States	1995	VHF	CD	VHF#18
