= Through Glass Coloured Roses: The Best of the Green Pajamas =

Through Glass Coloured Roses

Compilation album by The Green Pajamas
- Released: October 7, 2003
- Genre: Alternative rock, indie rock, neo-psychedelia
- Length: 58:55
- Label: Hidden Agenda
- Producer: Joe Ross, Jeff Kelly

The Green Pajamas chronology
Indian Winter (1997)	Through Glass Coloured Roses (2003)	The Night Races into Anna (2006)

Professional ratings
Review scores
Source	Rating
AllMusic	4/5 stars

Through Glass Coloured Roses is a compilation album by the Green Pajamas. It was released by Hidden Agenda Records, part of the independent label Parasol Records, in 2003.

== Track listing ==
1. "Kim the Waitress" (2003 version)
2. "Death by Poisoning"
3. "Rattlesnake Kiss"
4. "Just Another Perfect Day"
5. "She Doesn't Love You Anymore"
6. "Sweet Moth"
7. "High Waving Heather"
8. "Downslide"
9. "Queen of Sunshine"
10. "These Are the Best Times"
11. "She's Still Bewitching Me"
12. "The Secret of Her Smile"
13. "Tomorrow Will Bring Rain"
14. "This is Where We Disappear"
- (1) Previously unreleased
- (2-3, 9, and 12) from All Clues Lead to Meagan's Bed
- (4 and 10) from Narcotic Kisses
- (5, 7, and 11) from Seven Fathoms Down and Falling
- (6, 8, and 14) from This Is Where We Disappear
- (13) from Strung Behind the Sun
