= Rake (band) =

American rock band

Rake.
- Origin: Virginia, United States
- Genres: Experimental music Space rock Noise music Psychedelic music
- Years active: 1989 - approx. 2001
- Labels: VHF; Camera Obscura; Squealer
- Members: Jim Ayre (a.k.a. Vinnie Van Go-Go); Bill Kellum; Carl Moller (a.k.a. C-Man)

Rake. was an American art rock/noise rock musical ensemble from Fairfax Virginia, founded in 1989. Unaligned with the post-punk/hardcore bands more commonly associated with the local underground music scene, Rake. took a more experimental route and were more closely associated with fellow Virginia-based bands Pelt and Wingtip Sloat. Throughout the 1990s, a relationship cemented via their principal label, VHF Records.

Band members Jim Ayre (a.k.a. Vinnie Van Go-Go or OASTEM!), Bill Kellum, and Carl Moller (a.k.a. C-Man) released their first record in 1989, a 7” 45 rpm single called "Cow Song" and the follow-up EP "Motorcycle Shoes" in 1990. These releases were followed by the cassette "The Day I Remembered Seeing Ice" and the LP Rake Is My Co-Pilot, the latter featuring a free-jazz influened sidelong extemporization on the lead song from the "Motorcycle Shoes" EP The band's early recordings featured (mostly shouted) vocals, but the band's later work was generally instrumental in nature. Although Rake.'s main instruments were electric guitar, bass and drums, they made liberal use of tape loops, synthesizers, static, and anything else they saw fit. The band's sound reached a highbrow, minimalistic/ambient peak on 1998 album Resume The Cosmos, which was released by Australian label Camera Obscura but their aesthetic is best summed up by their double CD release The Art Ensemble of Rake/The Tell-Tale Moog which combined lengthy improvisations with found sounds, field recordings and harsh edits. The second disc was largely indexed at 60-second intervals, regardless of the musical content, although one 5-second section was simply a recording of a male voice saying, "Look out: rattlesnake!".

== OASTEM! ==
OASTEM! is a word invented by Rake. that appears in various album and song titles by the band, although its exact meaning has never been revealed. It may be used in several ways: as a greeting or as a way of saying good-bye; as an exclamation of satisfaction; or as a reference to cosmological and mystical phenomenon. Included are early cassettes such as "The Day I Remembered Seeing Ice" and "Shock Tart Chew Up" as well as more recent recordings under other names or by single members. An early version of the web site included the following greeting: "OASTEM! You have landed upon a web site devoted to the exploration of the Sound of Peace and Harmony that is expressed through OASTEM! Discuss OASTEM! Receive OASTEM! Achieve an understanding of the message that has captured the imagination of a generation."

== Discography ==
Studio albums

- Rake Is My Co-Pilot (VHF, 1994)
- The Art Ensemble of Rake/The Tell-Tale Moog (VHF, 1995)
- G-Man (Squealer, 1996)
- Resume the Cosmos (Camera Obscura, 1998)
- Ginseng Nights (VHF, 2002)
- Omniverse .:. Frequency (VHF, 2002)

Cassette albums

- The Day I Remembered Seeing Ice (Sweet Portable Junket, 1992)
- Shock Tart Chew Up (Chocolate Monk, 1993)
- Rake Live at the 15 Minutes Art Gallery (1994)

Live albums

- Fighting 2 Quarters and a Nickel (VHF, 1998)

EPs

- Motorcycle Shoes/Look at Rocks/My Miserable Existence/The Center (VHF, 1991)

Singles

- Cow Song/My Fish Died (L Records, 1990)
- Subterranean Marijuana Garden/U.S. TV (VHF, 1992)
- Squelch/Phrase Text Slur (Fourth Dimension, 1995)
- Art Ensemble of Rake (Carlophonics)/The Tell-Tale Moog (Carlophonics) (VHF, 1996)
