= Ginseng Nights =

Studio album by Rake.
- Released: 2002
- Recorded: Autumn 1996
- Studio: Barco Rebar, Falls Church, VA
- Genre: Experimental rock
- Length: 85:29
- Label: VHF
- Producer: Rake.

Rake. chronology
Resume the Cosmos (1998)	Ginseng Nights (2002)	Omniverse .:. Frequency (2002)

Ginseng Nights is the fifth studio album by Rake., released in 2002 by VHF Records.

== Track listing ==
All music is composed by Rake.

Disc one
No.	Title	Length
1.	"Black Crowes"	19:03
2.	"Love Rock"	23:44
3.	"Classic Rock Improvisors"	21:56

Disc two
No.	Title	Length
1.	"[untitled]"	20:46

== Personnel ==
Adapted from the Ginseng Nights liner notes.

Rake.

- Jim Ayre – electric guitar, vocals
- Bill Kellum – bass guitar
- Carl Moller – drums, saxophone

== Release history ==
Region	Date	Label	Format	Catalog
United States	2002	VHF	CD	VHF#69
