= Omniverse .:. Frequency =

Studio album by Rake.
- Released: 2002
- Genre: Experimental rock
- Length: 41:24
- Label: VHF
- Producer: Rake.

Rake. chronology
Ginseng Nights (2002)	Omniverse .:. Frequency (2002)

Omniverse .:. Frequency is the sixth studio album by Rake., released in 2002 by VHF Records.

== Track listing ==
All music is composed by Rake.

No.	Title	Length
1.	"Omniverse .:. Frequency"	41:24

== Personnel ==
Adapted from the Omniverse .:. Frequency liner notes.

Rake.

- Jim Ayre – electric guitar, vocals
- Bill Kellum – bass guitar
- Carl Moller – drums, saxophone

== Release history ==
Region	Date	Label	Format	Catalog
United States	2002	VHF	CD	VHF#70
