= Crystalized Movements =

American psychedelic rock band (1980-93)

- Origin: Tolland, Connecticut, United States
- Genre: Psychedelic rock
- Years active: 1980–1993
- Label: Twisted Village
- Past members: Wayne Rogers; Ed Boyden; Scott McLeod; Eric Arn; Kate Biggar; Teri Morris

Crystalized Movements were an American psychedelic rock/punk/folk band who recorded and performed sporadically from 1980 to 1993.

== History ==
The band was formed by guitarist Wayne Rogers and drummer Ed Boyden in Tolland, Connecticut when they were high school freshmen. Rogers and Boyden were brought together by a love of late 1970s No Wave music and 1960s psychedelia. After years of improvisational experimentation, they decided to make an LP in 1983 and recorded duo versions of some of Wayne's songs. They then split up upon graduating high school. Rogers, a longtime fan of the Plastic Cloud and Randy Holden, spent a summer piling on mountains of guitar overdubs. The resulting 'basement prog' album Mind Disaster, with Scott McLeod on vocals, was released at the end of that year in an edition of 130 (on Rogers' own record label, Twisted Village). After being discovered by record collectors, the album was reissued on Psycho in the UK in 1984.

Rogers put a full band together in 1985 before recording the next album: Dog... Tree... Satellite Seers, a scathing rebuke to "faux-lysergic posers". Guitarist Kate Biggar joined in 1988 upon Eric Arn's departure (to southern California where he formed Primordial Undermind), cementing the band's final lineup on the next album This Wideness Comes.

The 1992 album Revelations From Pandemonium, on which Rogers and Biggar were joined by McLeod on bass and Teri Morris on drums, proved to be Crystalized Movements' finale. The album received a three-star review from the Chicago Tribune, with Peter Margasak describing the band as "at the brink of becoming unhinged and jumping into a great abyss of no-holds-barred psychedelia".

Following the demise of the band, the Rogers/Biggar duo, who had also recorded as Vermonster during their time in Crystalized Movements, have continued on in critically acclaimed groups such as B.O.R.B., Magic Hour (with Damon and Naomi of Galaxie 500) and the Major Stars, Rogers also releasing four solo albums in the 1990s.

Rogers and Biggar married in the early 1990s.

== Discography ==
=== Albums ===
- Mind Disaster (1983), Twisted Village
- Dog... Tree... Satellite Seers (1987), Twisted Village
- This Wideness Comes (1989), Twisted Village
- Revelations From Pandemonium (1992), Twisted Village

Compilations

- Damaged Lights - Early Recordings 1980-1983 (1991), Twisted Village

=== Singles ===
- "Blown Over" (1991), Twisted Village
- "The Lowest Step" (1991), No. 6
