= The Bevis Frond =

English rock band

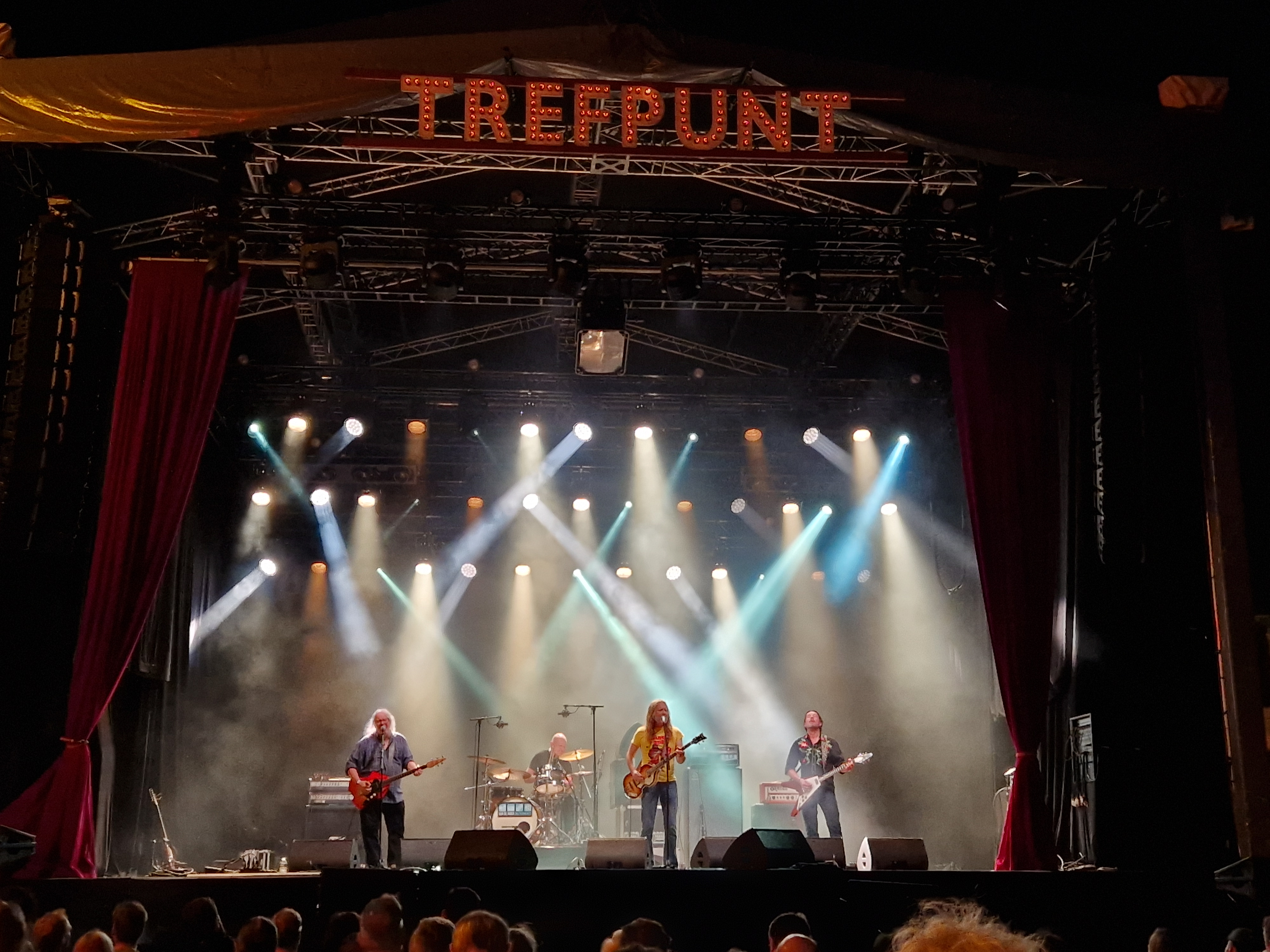
- The Bevis Frond performing at the 2024 Gentse Feesten

Background information
- Origin: Walthamstow, London, England
- Genres: Indie rock, alternative rock, neo-psychedelia, jangle pop
- Years active: 1986–present
- Labels: Woronzow, Reckless, Flydaddy, Fire Records (UK), Fruits de Mer
- Members: Nick Saloman; Louis Wigett; Paul Simmons; Dave Pearce
- Past members: Martin Crowley; Adrian Shaw; Bari Watts; Graham Cumming; Jules Felton; Andy Ward; Barry Dransfield; Rod Goodway; Simon House; Steve Broughton

The Bevis Frond are an English rock band formed in 1986 in Walthamstow, London, England. The band is fronted by Nick Saloman and has recorded many singles and albums on various independent labels.

== Information ==
Saloman was originally in a band known as the Bevis Frond Museum in the late 1960s, and in the 1970s, whilst at college, he played guitar with a duo called Oddsocks. They released one album, Men of the Moment. In 1979, he formed a band called the Von Trap Family, who released the first single on his own Woronzow Records label. The early Von Trap Family recordings, comprising three sessions, were released on the Bevis Frond Bandcamp site for the first time in May 2010. The next release on Woronzow was in 1982, a 12" single by Room 13 with Saloman on guitar and future Bevis Frond drummer Martin Crowley. After Room 13 reached the end of its natural life, Nick Saloman had a bad motorbike accident that left him with a constriction of movement in his left arm. True to form, he had the arm set so that he could continue playing guitar. With the proceeds from a damages claim he bought a 4 track recorder and recorded some music which he decided to press as a limited release of 250 albums, more for the sake of just releasing an album than anything else. He was very surprised when Funhouse records in Kent phoned him up and asked for a couple of hundred copies as they had been selling the album quite briskly. Saloman's desire was to "record the kind of music I'd like to listen to… I wanted a Hendrix/Wipers/Byrds sound but with a distinctly British feel." Subsequent albums were also recorded in a home studio and released on Woronzow until 1988, when he signed a deal with Reckless Records for the UK and USA. All the early albums were finally re-released on CD and Reckless financed the recording and release of his sixth album, Any Gas Faster, using a professional studio for the first time, reuniting him with drummer Martin Crowley. This is also the point that he began touring. Another 1990 album, Magic Eye, was a collaboration with Twink of the Pink Fairies. In 1990, he returned to the studio to record his next album, New River Head, which featured guest musicians including Barry Dransfield and David Tibet. The next year he recorded London Stone, but Reckless were less than happy with the album, and in the ensuing friction, Saloman decided to release the album on Woronzow again.

Saloman continued to release albums regularly until the release of Hit Squad in 2004. A couple of years earlier he had signed a deal with Past and Present in the UK and Rubric Records in the US, after which most of his early albums were remastered and re-released with bonus tracks. This initiative faltered after a couple of years, and all the early albums up to and including London Stone were re-released (except Any Gas Faster).

In February 2010, a download site was set up for the Bevis Frond. The aim of this project is to make all the Bevis Frond material available for download in the best possible quality, and to make digitally available unreleased tracks and vinyl only tracks from throughout Saloman's career. Recent additions include all the studio sessions by the Von Trap Family. This project was completed in September 2010.

Early albums were usually entirely recorded by Saloman, while most later albums have been recorded by the contemporary touring band. For performances, the Bevis Frond usually has Adrian "Ade" Shaw on bass. Bevis Frond material is typically released on Woronzow Records label, and is frequently featured in the Ptolemaic Terrascope magazine and accompanying records and CDs. The Bevis Frond also record with and write much of the material for US singer Mary Lou Lord. The song "Lights Are Changing" was chosen for inclusion on Children of Nuggets: Original Artyfacts from the Second Psychedelic Era, 1976–1995.

After seven years without the appearance of new material, The Bevis Frond released a new album, The Leaving of London, on 10 October 2011. Recorded at Golddust Studios, it features a new drummer, Dave Pearce, formerly of Woronzow artists Psycho's Mum, along with regular contributors Adrian Shaw and Paul Simmons. Live shows in Europe and the UK to promote the album are scheduled for late 2011 and early 2012. In January 2012 the band toured Germany.

Following The Leaving of London, The Bevis Frond released White Numbers in May 2013, with a similar band line-up. In 2014, the compilation titled High in a Flat was released including that song, which had been released on the CD reissue of New River Head but not on the one-CD release earlier. Then, in September 2015, Nick released a new album titled Example 22.

Saloman and Simmons host a weekly radio program called "The Scene", covering music from the 1960s to the 1980s, usually nearly-forgotten tracks from their own extensive record collections. It is broadcast from 7:00 A.M to 8:00 A.M. on Friday mornings on MIT's radio station WMBR, 88.1 FM, in Cambridge, Massachusetts. They use their knowledge of musicians' timelines, bands played in and with to connect songs they play to other musicians and other bands. Saloman is owner of Platform One Records, a vinyl record store in Bexhill, East Sussex, United Kingdom-chiefly selling used 'rock' vinyl.

== Personal life ==
In 1991, Nick Saloman was a contestant on the Channel 4 game show Countdown. He is a supporter of Queen's Park Rangers F.C., prompting Richard Whiteley to joke "What do you get when you cross The Bevis Frond and Queen's Park Rangers? Rock bottom."

Saloman's mother Joanne was a schoolteacher to Adam Ant and is credited by Ant as first having encouraged him to be an artist. Saloman himself was also friends with Ant at school and later, according to Ant, would introduce him to "long hair, Jimi Hendrix and loud guitars, which he played wildly and not without skill."

== Personnel ==
The Bevis Frond is essentially Nick Saloman, who does vocals and plays guitar, bass, drums, and keyboards. He is also the producer.

The recording and touring band has included at various times:

Adrian Shaw (bass guitar)
Louis Wigett (bass guitar)
Bari Watts (guitar)
Ric Gunther (drums)
Paul Simmons (guitar)
Rod Goodway (guitar, vocals)
Andy Ward (drums)
Jules Fenton (drums)
Martin Crowley (drums)
Debbie Saloman (vocals)
Dave Pearce (drums)

== Discography ==
=== Albums ===
Year	Album	Label	Additional information
1987	Miasma	Woronzow Records	
1987	Inner Marshland	Woronzow Records	
1987	Bevis Through the Looking Glass	Woronzow Records	
1988	Acid Jam	Woronzow Records	
1988	Triptych	Woronzow Records	
1989	Auntie Winnie Album	Reckless Records	
1990	Any Gas Faster	Reckless Records	
1990	Ear Song	Reckless Records	studio/live album
1991	Magic Eye	Woronzow Records	with Twink
1991	New River Head	Woronzow Records	
1992	A Gathering of Fronds	Reckless Records	
1992	London Stone	Woronzow Records	
1993	It Just Is	Woronzow Records	
1994	Sprawl	Woronzow Records	
1995	Superseeder	Woronzow Records	
1996	Son of Walter	Flydaddy Records	
1997	North Circular	Flydaddy Records	
1999	Vavona Burr	Flydaddy Records	
1999	Live at the Great American Music Hall	Flydaddy Records	live album
2000	Valedictory Songs	Woronzow Records	
2002	What Did for the Dinosaurs	Woronzow Records	
2004	Hit Squad	Woronzow Records	
2011	The Leaving of London	Woronzow Records	
2013	White Numbers	Woronzow Records	
2014	High in a Flat	Woronzow Records	
2015	Example 22	Woronzow Records	
2018	We're Your Friends, Man	Fire Records	
2021	Little Eden	Fire Records	
2024	Focus on Nature	Fire Records	
2026	Horrorful Heights	Fire Records	

In addition, Saloman has also released three Bevis Frond CDs that were made available exclusively to the Yahoo! Bevis Frond community group. These CDs, titled Valedictory Demos, The Long Ones, and Clocks, were packed full of demos and unreleased songs.

=== Singles ===
- "Sexorcist" (1990) Clawfist (split with Walkingseeds)
- Snow EP (1991) Woronzow (free with Ptolemaic Terrascope magazine)
- "High in a Flat" (free with Bucketfull of Brains magazine, split with Dream Syndicate)
- Summer Holiday EP (1993) Woronzow
- "Let's Live For Today" / "29th September" (1994) Helter Skelter, HS 94743
- "Dolly Bug" / "Green Park Saturday" (1995) Damaged Goods, DAMGOOD 81
- "Little Town Pier" / "Anything You Say" (1997) Spare Me, SM005
- "Sister John" / "Off My Shoes" (1997) Distortion Records, DR-1033
- "African Violets" (1988) B-side of a Flexi-Disc given away with Freakbeat fanzine Issue 4 – The A side was "History Hates No Man" by The Steppes
- "You Wouldn't If You Knew" (2001) from Dean Quixote: The Soundtrack to the Film (various artists), SpinART, SPART 99
- "Estate" (2011) Respect Vinyl
- "Hard Meat at the Midnight Court" / "Number One Defender" (2012) Woronzow, WOO 59
- "Fronds of the Fish" (2017) Fruits de Mer Records
- "Fronds of the Fish II" (2019) Fruits de Mer Records

=== Related releases ===
Bevis Frond/Nick Saloman pseudonyms and collaborations:

- The Von Trap Family – "Brand New Thrill" single (1980) Woronzow
- Room 13 – "Murder Mystery" single (1982) Woronzow
- Room 13 – Peaceful War album
- Room 13 – Live at The Pits album
- Bevis and Twink – Magic Eye album (1990) Woronzow
- Magic Muscle – Gulp album (1992) Woronzow
- Fred Bison Five – Beatroots album (1993) Woronzow
- Todd Dillingham & Nick Saloman – Art into Dust CD (1993) Voiceprint
- Doctor Frond – Doctor Frond album (1998) Magic Gnome
- Country Joe McDonald and The Bevis Frond – Eat Flowers and Kiss Babies album (1998) Woronzow
- Nick and Nick and the Psychotic Drivers (1998) Contempo Records – Nick plays lead
- Acid Jam 2 (2000) Rubric Records – Bevis Frond members wrote or play on almost all tracks
- Scorched Earth – Fed To Your Head album (2001) Woronzow
- Mary Lou Lord – "Lights Are Changing" cover from Mary Lou Lord
- Mary Lou Lord – Baby Blue album 2004 (Rubric Records) Writing and production credits, plus guitar bass and harp.
- Anton Barbeau – King of Missouri (2003) Anton Barbeau with The Bevis Frond

== See also ==
- Ptolemaic Terrascope
- Phil McMullen
- Terrastock
