= Landing (band) =

American indie rock band

- Also known as: May Landing (originally)
- Origin: Provo, Utah, United States
- Genres: Indie rock, ambient, shoegaze, slowcore, space rock
- Years active: 1997 – present
- Labels: The Music Fellowship; Vast Arc Hues; These Are Not Records; Ba Da Bing Records; Strange Attractors Audio House; K Records; Equation Records; Geographic North; El Paraiso; Jonathon Whiskey
- Members: Aaron Snow; Adrienne Snow; Daron Gardner; John Bent
- Past members: Dick Baldwin; Peter Baumann
- Website: landing.bandcamp.com/music

Landing is an American indie rock band from Connecticut, United States. Genres used to describe Landing's music include ambient, shoegaze, slowcore, and space rock. Past members have included Dick Baldwin (guitar, bass) and Peter Baumann (not the same musician who was once a member of Tangerine Dream). The most current line up features Daron Gardner (bass) and John Bent (drums).

== History ==
Originally named May Landing as a duo, the group changed the name to Landing in 1998 with the additions of Dick Baldwin and Daron Gardner.

Landing returned June 2012 with the release of their eighth LP and first LP on Geographic North, entitled Landing. The nine songs were written and recorded over the six-year hiatus following Gravitational IV. "Heart Finds the Beat" was the first single released off the album.

Since 2012, Landing has released three LPs including Third Sight and Bells In New Towns on El Paraiso Records, and Complekt on These Are Not Records. The band has also released four EPs including Wave Lair, II, Body Diffuser, and Taeppe.

In December 2016, American webzine Somewherecold ranked Third Sight No. 2 on their Somewherecold Awards 2016 list.

== Discography ==
=== Studio albums ===
- Circuit - (Music Fellowship, July 2001)
- Oceanless - (Strange Attractors, November 2001)
- Seasons - (Ba Da Bing!, May 2002)
- Passages Through - (K Records, June 2003)
- Sphere - (K Records, September 2004)
- Brocade - (Strange Attractors, November 2005)
- Gravitational IV - (Equation Records, November 2006)
- Landing - (Geographic North Records, June 2012)
- Third Sight (El Paraiso Records, 2016)
- Complekt (These Are Not Records, 2016)
- Bells In New Towns (El Paraiso Records, 2018)
- Landing/Headroom split LP (Redscroll Records, 2020)
- Tendrils (Vast Arc Hues, 2025)

=== EPs and singles ===
- Centrefuge (EP) - (Music Fellowship, March 1999)
- "Bjorn Whiskey 34" (w/ "Printed Circuit") (Jonathon Whiskey, 2001)
- Windy & Carl Split EP - (Music Fellowship, June 2001)
- Tour EP 2002 - (Vast Arc Hues, June 2002)
- "Fade In / Fade Out" - (Strange Attractors, October 2002)
- "New Found Land" (w/ "Rothko, Yellow6") - (Music Fellowship, January 2003)
- "Into the Hall" 7" - (Geographic North Records, You Can't Hide Your Love Forever Vol. 5 October 2009)
- "Wave Lair" - (These Are Not Records, 2013)
- "II" - (Vast Arc Hues, 2013)
- "Body Diffuser" - (Vast Arc Hues, 2015)
- "Taeppe" - (Vast Arc Hues, October 2017)
