= Michael J. Schumacher =

American Beat Generation author (1950–2025)

Michael Schumacher
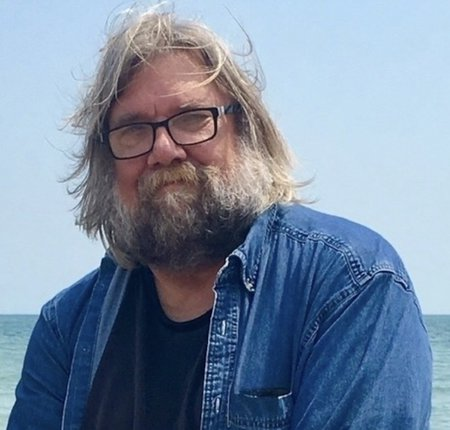
- Schumacher in 2018
- Born: May 22, 1950; Topeka, Kansas
- Died: December 29, 2025 (aged 75); Kenosha, Wisconsin
- Education: Pius XI Catholic High School, St. Joseph High School
- Alma mater: University of Wisconsin-Parkside
- Occupations: Writer, journalist, biographer
- Spouse: Susan (div.)
- Children: 2 sons, 1 daughter
- Writing career
- Period: 1973–2025
- Genre: Biography
- Subjects: Allen Ginsberg, Eric Clapton, Phil Ochs
- Notable works: Dharma Lion, critical biography of Allen Ginsberg
- Movement: Beat Generation

Michael J. Schumacher (May 22, 1950 – December 29, 2025) was an American author and journalist who wrote biographies of Beat Generation poet Allen Ginsberg, filmmaker Francis Ford Coppola, musicians Eric Clapton and Phil Ochs, comics legends Al Capp and Will Eisner, and a series of books on Great Lakes shipwrecks.

== Biography ==
His career began with interviews of writers he admired, such as Studs Terkel, George Plimpton, Jay McInerney, Kurt Vonnegut, Joseph Heller, Allen Ginsberg, Joyce Carol Oates, Bret Easton Ellis, Tama Janowitz and Raymond Carver for Writer’s Digest magazine, which he transformed into the books Reasons to Believe: New Voices in American Fiction and Creative Conversations: The Writer’s Complete Guide to Conducting Interviews. His Vonnegut and Oates interviews were included in the 2007 book Legends of Literature: The Best Articles, Interviews, and Essays from the Archives of Writer’s Digest Magazine. Schumacher was an early contributor in the 1970s for the Milwaukee underground/alternative periodical Bugle-American, and later for its successor, the Shepherd Express. He honed his early craft by writing book reviews for Midwest newspapers.

Schumacher stepped up to national media by interviewing musician Tom Waits for Playboy magazine; his deep interviews with musicians led him to write the books There but for Fortune: The Life of Phil Ochs and Crossroads: The Life and Music of Eric Clapton. His biography of Phil Ochs was possibly the work that meant the most to Schumacher: "Phil just brought out such an emotional depth in people. I've had people break down in conversations, twenty years after his death."

== Allen Ginsberg and Dharma Lion ==
Schumacher spent considerable time in New York City interviewing Allen Ginsberg and delving into his letters and archives for his 1992 magnum opus, Dharma Lion: A Critical Biography of Allen Ginsberg, revised and republished in 2016. Recalling the genesis of the project, he recalled, “You have to have a certain amount of hope to even think that here you are in the Midwest, you've met Allen Ginsberg, and now you can actually do a book about him—that you could actually approach him about it. It took a lot of nerve, and when I look back on it, and all my other biographies, I find myself asking what I was doing writing these books. I'm always amazed by this. Here I am, just an ordinary Joe, and all of a sudden, I'm meeting people who were and are heroes of mine from since I was young—and they trust me."

Publishers Weekly hailed Dharma Lion as “a monumental cultural biography.” Kirkus Reviews called it a "Strong, wonderfully absorbing life of Beat bard Allen Ginsberg that breaks new ground in its critical analyses of the poet’s work. Schumacher goes over the events in Ginsberg’s life with an intelligence that bonds us to the emotionally battered poet. … Rings the doorbell on your heart, your brain, and your love of great verse.” Timothy Leary said, “Dharma Lion is a thorough, detailed, painstaking, monumental, comprehensive, encyclopedic account of the life of our Poet Laureate, Allen Ginsberg.” Poet/publisher Lawrence Ferlinghetti proclaimed that “The man, the poet visionary who created the beat generation single-mindedly out of the whole cloth of his dharma brothers is here embodied whole.”

Kerouac biographer Gerald Nicosia said that “One of the things Dharma Lion makes clear is that Ginsberg cannot be pigeonholed as just a spokesman for outcasts and radicals, for the down-and-out and oppressed. Though he certainly is that, Schumacher shows him to be, above all, a poet and teacher of the highest seriousness, whose thoughts, theories, and practice have never ceased to evolve in response to the needs of his society and his time.”

Schumacher’s deep research into Ginsberg carried on when he wrote First Thought: Conversations with Allen Ginsberg, and edited Ginsberg’s South American Journals: January-July 1960, Iron Curtain Journals: January-May 1965, The Fall of America Journals 1965-1971, Family Business: Selected Letters Between A Father and Son -- Allen and Louis Ginsberg, and The Essential Ginsberg, A Volume of the Best of Ginsberg’s Poems, Essays, Songs, Letters, Journal Entries, Interviews, and Photographs.

== Other literary works ==
Schumacher’s interest in the tumult of America in the 1960s was also evident in The Contest: The 1968 Election and the War for America's Soul, forecasting the current era of media as entertainment over analysis, bipartisanship's unravelling, and public cynicism over electoral politics.

His other biographies included Francis Ford Coppola: A Filmmaker’s Life, Will Eisner: A Dreamer’s Life in Comics, Al Capp: A Life to the Contrary, and Mr. Basketball: George Mikan, the Minneapolis Lakers, and the Birth of the NBA.

Schumacher’s lifelong home near Lake Michigan influenced his decision to write a series of Great Lakes shipwreck histories, including one on the pop-song-famous Edmund Fitzgerald: Mighty Fitz: The Sinking of the Edmund Fitzgerald. Others were: Too Much Sea for Their Decks: Shipwrecks of Minnesota's North Shore and Isle Royale; Wreck of the Carl D.: A True Story of Loss, Survival, and Rescue at Sea; November's Fury: The Deadly Great Lakes Hurricane of 1913; Torn in Two: The Sinking of the Daniel J. Morrell and One Man's Survival on the Open Sea; and Along Lake Michigan: Shipwreck Stories of Life and Loss.

Born in Topeka, Kansas, Schumacher spent his childhood from age 4-17 in the Milwaukee bedroom suburb of Greenfield and moved to Kenosha in 1967 when his father was hired as personnel director by the Kenosha school system. Michael Schumacher went to the Pius XI Catholic High School in Milwaukee, then St. Joseph High School after his family moved to Kenosha. He studied English and political science at the University of Wisconsin-Parkside between 1968 and 1974. He dropped out of university just one course short of graduating, turning to journalism and literature. “To be honest, going to Parkside was mostly about staying out of the draft,” Schumacher said.

His father provided a powerful role model: Al Schumacher wrote two children’s books and a young adult biography of Roger Taney, the Supreme Court justice who wrote the 1857 Dred Scott decision denying U.S. citizenship and equal rights to African Americans. Schumacher remembered his father's writing and researching at home, it was a big part of his childhood memory, where his father encouraged him to write booklets of his own, as Schumacher recalled in an interview with Weber State University's Beat literature historian Carl James Porter.

Schumacher’s entire adult life was spent in Kenosha, except for forays to New York City and elsewhere to conduct interviews and research for his books and articles. He emulated Chicago author/interviewer Studs Terkel, whom he interviewed early in his career, as a home-grown Midwestern writer up from the working class who never forgot from where he came. In Kenosha, his literary salon was Franks Diner, where he held court among laid-off American Motors autoworkers (where Schumacher worked several times between major projects), and had a sandwich named for him on the menu. A New York Times reporter gathering quotes for a man-in-the-street reaction story found him there eating a bratwurst for breakfast in 2004. “Imagine a raspy-voiced Gentle Ben with some hippie blood and a major caffeine fix,” the Milwaukee Journal Sentinel newspaper wrote in a 1995 profile.

== Works ==
- Reasons to believe: new voices in American fiction / The Writer’s Complete Guide to Conducting Interviews. New York: St. Martin's Press. 1988. ISBN 978-0-312-01811-5. OCLC 17411881. OL 2406705M.
- Dharma lion: a critical biography of Allen Ginsberg. New York: St. Martin's Press. 1992. ISBN 978-0-312-08179-9. OCLC 26161842.
- Crossroads: the life and music of Eric Clapton. New York: Hyperion. 1995. ISBN 978-0-7868-6074-6. OCLC 31291753.
- There but for fortune: the life of Phil Ochs. New York: Hyperion. 1996. ISBN 978-0-7868-6084-5. OCLC 34355494.
- Francis Ford Coppola: a filmmaker's life. New York: Crown Publishers. 1999. ISBN 978-0-517-70445-5. OCLC 40776704.
- Mr. Basketball : George Mikan, the Minneapolis Lakers, and the birth of the NBA. New York: Bloomsbury. 2007. ISBN 978-1-59691-213-7. OCLC 85830728.
- Will Eisner: a dreamer's life in comics. New York: Bloomsbury. 2010. ISBN 978-1-60819-013-3. OCLC 555656597.
- The contest: the 1968 election and the war for America's soul. Minneapolis: University of Minnesota Press. 2018. ISBN 978-0-8166-9289-7. OCLC 1007308408.

=== Shipwreck series ===
- Mighty Fitz: the sinking of the Edmund Fitzgerald. New York: Bloomsbury Publishers. 2005. ISBN 978-1-58234-647-2. OCLC 59149406.
- Wreck of the Carl D.: a true story of loss, survival, and rescue at sea. Bloomington, IN: Quarry Books. 2010. ISBN 978-0-253-22258-9. OCLC 918197364.
- November's Fury: The Deadly Great Lakes Hurricane of 1913. Minneapolis: University of Minnesota Press. 2014. ISBN 978-0-8166-8720-6. OCLC 1465829640.
- Torn in two: the sinking of the Daniel J. Morrell and one man's survival on the open sea. Minneapolis: University of Minnesota Press. 2016. ISBN 978-0-8166-9521-8. OCLC 947269726.
- Too much sea for their decks: shipwrecks of Minnesota's north shore and Isle Royale. Minneapolis: University of Minnesota Press. 2023. ISBN 978-1-5179-1284-0. OCLC 1346615620.
- Along Lake Michigan : shipwreck stories of life and loss. Minneapolis: University of Minnesota Press. 2025. ISBN 978-1-5179-1677-0. OCLC 1522761318.

=== Collaborations ===
- Schumacher, Michael (2007). "Chapters: Oates and Vonnegut". Legends of literature : the best articles, interviews, and essays from the archives of Writer's digest magazine. By Sexton, Phillip. Cincinnati, Ohio: Writer's Digest Books. ISBN 978-1-58297-473-6. OCLC 86090351.
- Schumacher, Michael; Friends of Hawthorn Hollow (Kenosha, Wis) (2012). Just wild land: the story of Hawthorn Hollow Nature Sanctuary & Arboretum. Kenosha, WI: Friends of Hawthorn Hollow. OCLC 955371807.
- Schumacher, Michael; Kitchen, Denis (2013). Al Capp : a life to the contrary. New York: Bloomsbury. ISBN 978-1-60819-623-4. OCLC 772106404.
- Ginsberg, Allen; Schumacher, Michael (2017). First thought : conversations with Allen Ginsberg. Minneapolis: University of Minnesota Press. ISBN 978-0-8166-9918-6. OCLC 962254249.

== Works as editor ==
- Kraegel, Janet M.; Kachoyeanos, Mary (1989). Schumacher, Michael (ed.). Just a nurse: from clinic to hospital ward, battleground to cancer unit : the hearts and minds of nurses today. New York: Dutton. ISBN 978-0-525-24760-9. OCLC 18589868.
- Schumacher, Michael, ed. (2019). The trial of the Edmund Fitzgerald: eyewitness accounts from the U.S. Coast Guard hearings. Minneapolis: University of Minnesota Press. ISBN 978-1-5179-0644-3. OCLC 1081378956.
- Ginsberg, Allen; Ginsberg, Louis (2001). Schumacher, Michael (ed.). Family business : selected letters between a father and son. New York: Bloomsbury. ISBN 978-1-58234-107-1. OCLC 46858824.
- Ginsberg, Allen (2015). Schumacher, Michael (ed.). The Essential Ginsberg. New York: Harper Perennial. ISBN 978-0-06-236228-5. OCLC 890178581.
- Ginsberg, Allen (2019). Schumacher, Michael (ed.). South American journals : January-July 1960. Minneapolis: University of Minnesota Press. ISBN 978-0-8166-9961-2. OCLC 1090282761.
- Ginsberg, Allen (2018). Schumacher, Michael (ed.). Iron Curtain journals : January-May 1965. Minneapolis: University of Minnesota Press. ISBN 978-0-8166-9959-9. OCLC 1100778478.
- Ginsberg, Allen (2020). Schumacher, Michael (ed.). The Fall of America journals, 1965-1971. Minneapolis: University of Minnesota Press. ISBN 978-0-8166-9963-6. OCLC 1154107864.
