= The Goner =

- Origin: Stockholm, Sweden
- Genres: Psychedelic folk, folk rock, drone
- Years active: 2008–2012
- Labels: Svarta Marknaden, Deep Water Acres, Sideways Through Sound, Dying For Bad Music, Lystring
- Members: Daniel Westerlund; Johan Knudsen; Jonas Eriksson; Karin Agatonne; Anna Holm; Sebastian Tunstig
- Past members: Petra Wahlgren; Josef Bjerlin; Thorbjörn Skoglund
- Website: Official site

The Goner was a psychedelic folk rock band from Sweden. Starting out as a solo project of Daniel Westerlund in 2008, the lineup quickly expanded and over time developed into a six piece live band; playing an eclectic range of instruments including banjo, violin and synths.

The Goner debuted in 2008 with a series of EPs dubbed the H-Trilogy on Daniel Westerlund's own CD-R label Svarta Marknaden: Halartrallar, Hind Hand and Haven. These limited releases garnered some interest and collectively secured the #1 spot on It's a Trap! Scandinavian Music Journal's top album list of 2008. The following year, Hind Hand and Haven were reissued as the double album HH on US-based label Deep Water Acres. Featuring The Goner in full band mode, the release of Behold A New Traveler in 2010 drew further attention including a favorable review by Julian Cope, author of Krautrocksampler.

== Discography ==
=== Releases ===
- H-Trilogy
  - Halartrallar (Svarta Marknaden, 2008)
  - Hind Hand (Svarta Marknaden, 2008)
  - Haven (Svarta Marknaden, 2008)
- HH, reissue of Hind Hand and Haven (Deep Water Acres, 2009)
- Behold A New Traveler (Deep Water Acres, 2010)
- Bitemarks EP (Sideways Through Sound, Dying For Bad Music, 2010)

=== Compilation appearances ===
- Det Grymma Svärdet #5, magazine with 10-inch vinyl (Lystring, 2010) "Backwards Crawl Relay"
