= Charalambides =

American musical group

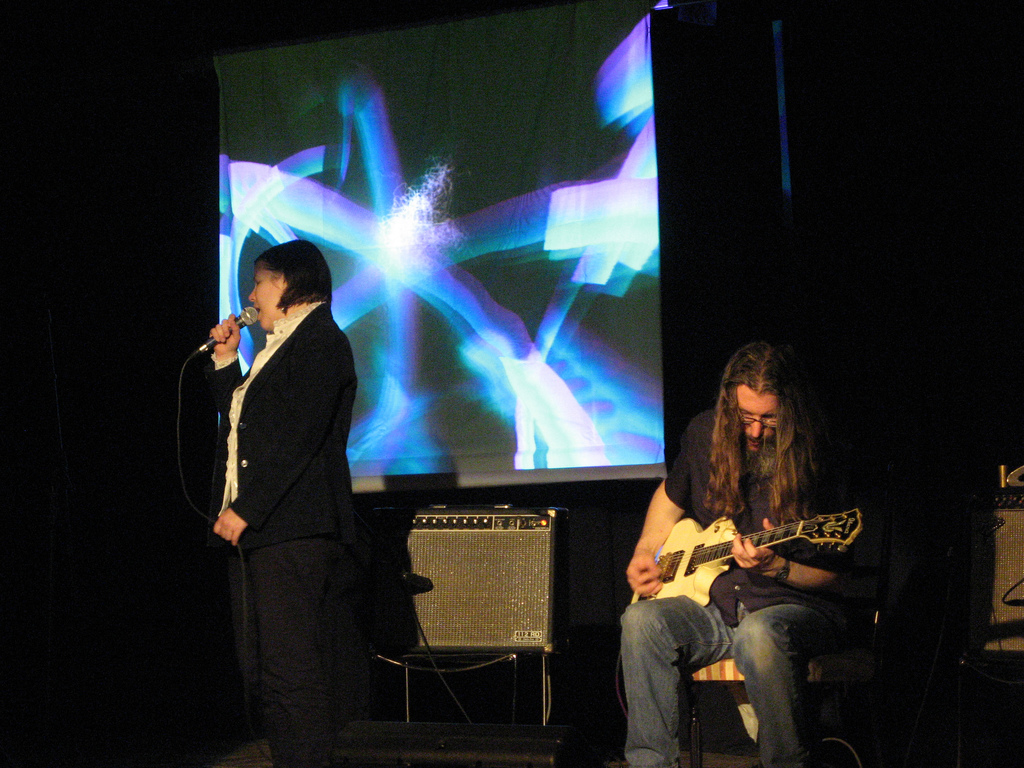
- Charalambides in 2007

Background information
- Also known as: Mutual Admiration Society
- Origin: Houston, Texas
- Genres: Avant-garde; New Weird America; post-rock; drone
- Years active: 1991–present
- Labels: Kranky, Eclipse Records, Time-Lag, Siltbreeze, Wholly Other
- Members: Tom Carter, Christina Carter, Kyle Silfer, Jason Bill, Heather Leigh Murray

Charalambides is an avant-garde musical group originally from Houston, Texas, United States and lately of Austin, Texas. They were formed in 1991 under the short-lived name Mutual Admiration Society by Tom Carter, Christina Carter and Kyle Silfer, and later members have since included Jason Bill and Heather Leigh Murray. The band has long considered itself primarily a duo between Tom and Christina Carter. Their music contains elements typical of psychedelic music such as reverb, backwards recording, extended instrumental jamming and the use of found sounds, which led to them being described as part of the New Weird America movement. In addition to several major releases on labels such as Kranky, Eclipse Records, and Time-Lag Records, they have also released many small edition CD-Rs on their own Wholly Other label, and other small independent labels, some of which have later been re-issued (Our Bed is Green, and Historic Sixth Ward for example).

Their name derives from the surname of a customer at the record shop where core members Tom Carter and Christina Carter met, who are divorced but remain together as a musical unit. They have also released albums on Kranky and Eclipse Records under their own names, as well as several small edition CD-Rs. In addition, the two have collaborated with numerous other musicians such as Loren Mazzacane Connors, Yellow Swans and Robert Horton.

== Selected discography ==
=== Primary album releases on Siltbreeze and Kranky ===
- Our Bed Is Green CS-100 (No Label, 1993) Reissued as 2CD on Kranky, 2005
- Union LP (Siltbreeze, 1993)
- Market Square 2LP (Siltbreeze, 1995)
- Houston CD (Siltbreeze, 1998)
- Unknown Spin CD (Kranky, 2003)
- Joy Shapes LP/CD (Kranky, 2004)
- A Vintage Burden (Kranky, 2006)
- Likeness CD (Kranky, 2007)
- Exile LP/CD (Kranky, 2011)
- Tom and Christina Carter LP/CS (Drawing Room, 2018)

=== Limited edition album releases, self-released, CD-R's ===
- Historic 6th Ward CS-90 (No Label, 1994) (Reissued as CD on (Wholly Other, 1996 and 2 LP on (Time-Lag Records, 2002)
- Internal Eternal CD (Wholly Other, 1999)
- Sticks CD-R (Wholly Other, 2000)
- Branches Lathe LP (Eclipse Records, 2001) Edition of 100 copies
- YIH CD-R (Carbon Records, 2001) Limited to 100 copies
- Untitled split CD-R (with Scorces) (Wholly Other, 2002) (Charalambides side reissued as Unknown Spin on Kranky, 2003)
- Being As Is CD-R (Crucial Blast, 2002) Limited edition of 100 copies
- CHT CD-R (Wholly Other, 2002) Limited edition CDr, 200 copies.
- IN CR EA SE 2LP (Eclipse Records, 2002)
- Emerald Message CD-R (Wholly Other, 2006) Recorded in Houston, 12/23/95 except for 4 recorded 12/22/95 as part of the _Internal Eternal_ sessions
- Glowing Raw CD-R (Wholly Other, 2006) limited edition of 250 copies. Recorded 1995–98
- Strangle The Wretched Heavens CD-R (Wholly Other, 2007) Recorded 1994–96
- Electricity Ghost CD (Wholly Other, 2007) Recorded during the "Joy Shapes" Sessions in 2003
- Rose/Thorn LP (Klang Industries, 2008)
- Three-Lane Blacktop LP (Two-Lane Blacktop, 2010) Edition of 500 copies.

=== Live albums ===
- Charalambides CD (Wholly Other, 1997)
- Home CD-R (Wholly Other, 2000)
- Water CD-R (Wholly Other, 2001)
- The Work Of Glaciers (Not On Label, 2001)
- Live Hand Held CD-R (Wholly Other, 2002) Limited edition CDr, 200 copies
- Live/Dead CD-R (Wholly Other, 2005)
- Dead/Live CD-R (Wholly Other, 2005)
- Live At Graag Traag Festival #2 CDr, Ltd (Majjem Radio Recordings, 2012)

=== Singles, EP's, collaborations ===
- "Devils"/"Bid You Goodnight" 7" (Playtime, 1995)
- "Naked in Our Deathskins" on Harmony of the Spheres Comp 3LP (Reissued as 2CD, 1999) (Drunken Fish, 1996)
- "Spring Leaves Fall"/"Sun or Wind" 7" (Timelag, 2002)
- Ana/Kata 10" EP (Beta-lactam Ring Records, 2002)
- 'Charalambides / Pocahaunted - Split (7", Single, Ltd, 2008)

=== Compilation appearances ===
- "On the Corner"/"Winning Friends"/"13,14" on Heartland Comp CS-60 (Seagrave, 1994)
- "Variant"/"Mayflower" on Drilling the Curve Comp LP (Fleece, 1995)
- "Hyetal" on Whump! Comp 7" (Bobby J, 1996)
- "Drop" on Succour Comp 2CD (Woronzow, 1996)
- "Mansfield" on The Nature of Systems Comp CD (Carbon Records, 2000)
- "One Song" on Serotonin Ronin Comp 2CD (Camera Obscura, 2000)
- "Rehearsal" on Urban Meadows Comp CD (Broken Face, 2000)
- "Second Rehearsal" on Songs From the Entopic Garden Volume 2 Split LP (with Six Organs of Admittance) (Timelag, 2001)
- Untitled track on Intersect 4 Comp CD (Pale-Disk, 2002)
- "Song for Always" on Ptolemaic Terrascope No. 32 comp CD (P.T., 2002)
- Lactamase Bonus Compilation
