= Bucketfull of Brains =

London-based music magazine

- Cover of BoB #81 (Summer/Autumn 2013)
- Editor: Nick West; Terry Hermon
- Categories: Music
- Founder: Nigel Cross
- Founded: 1979
- Country: United Kingdom
- Based in: London
- Language: English
- Website: www.bucketfullofbrains.com

Bucketfull of Brains (also known as BoB) was a London-based music magazine, founded in 1979 and published until 2015 . An associated record label was launched in 2010.

== History ==
Bucketfull of Brains was founded by Nigel Cross in 1979, and was published in the UK continuously, on an irregular schedule, until 2015. Nigel Cross edited the first ten issues. Jon Storey took over in 1984 and edited the magazine from BoB#11 to BoB#45. In 1996, the magazine passed to an editorial board comprising Nick West, Joss Hutton, Joe Presedo and Terry Hermon. Joss Hutton and Joe Presedo both resigned in 1999, leaving an editorial team of West and Hermon from BoB#55 until the magazine's closure with BoB#83 in 2015.

Editorial interest, over the years, has included "an affection for songs with guitars and thus bands like the Barracudas, the Flamin' Groovies, the Dream Syndicate, the Long Ryders and the Green Pajamas hold a special place in its affections."

Bucketfull of Brains has been acknowledged by Trouser Press as a source of "essential discographical and background information." According to American music writer John M. Borack, the magazine has earned a reputation as a "quality, focused publication" in both Great Britain and the United States by "championing worthy artists big and small".

In 1989, founder and editor Nigel Cross received an unusual honour from members of the band R.E.M. During R.E.M.'s 1989 tour for their album Green (1988), members of R.E.M. combined with Robyn Hitchcock and Peter Holsapple to form a band that they called Nigel and the Crosses, which played two concerts during periods between R.E.M.'s shows. Nigel and the Crosses debuted on 8 March 1989 with a show in Minneapolis, and in London on 28 May 1989, Nigel and the Crosses played a 90-minute show in Soho at the Borderline Club, which BoB reviewer Jon Storey called "enough fine music ... to satisfy anyone." Nigel and the Crosses also recorded a version of the song "Wild Mountain Thyme" for the 1989 album Time Between – A Tribute to The Byrds, and a live 7" single that was distributed with BoB #34.

In addition to publishing the magazine and associated blogs, in 2010 Bucketfull of Brains launched a record label, which is distributed by Proper Music Distribution. Its recording artists include Benjamin Folke Thomas, Trent Miller and John Murry.
