= Phil McMullen =

British writer and music journalist

Phil McMullen is a British writer and music journalist. He was the founding editor of Ptolemaic Terrascope magazine from 1989 until 2005, at which time management of the publication was handed over to Pat Thomas in North America. McMullen consequently ran the website named Terrascope Online and from 2012 onwards founded a hand-crafted letterpress periodical dedicated to music named the Terrascopædia. McMullen also founded the semi-annual Terrastock indie rock festivals which have taken place in North America (and once in London, England) since 1987. In 2013, he curated the first Woolf Music festival. There has also been a series of concerts staged under the name Terrascope Audio Entertainments. Phil lives in the West of England and in addition to owning and operating The Ptolemaic Press writes primarily about psychedelic, improvised, experimental rock and folk music.

In an interview published in 2005 Nick Saloman of the band The Bevis Frond praised McMullen and describe him as "one of that rare breed, a music fan who doesn't want to be a musician".

== See also ==
- Terrastock
