= Timelag =

Board game

Timelag is a 1980 board game published by Gameshop, Inc., which soon after was renamed to Nova Game Designs.

== Gameplay ==
Timelag is a strategic two-player science fiction game in which each player controls one civilization at war with the other civilization.

== Reception ==
Robert Destro reviewed Timelag in The Space Gamer No. 37. Destro commented that "I would recommend Timelag to those who like micro-type games."

Steve List reviewed Timelag in Ares Magazine #8 and commented that "The rules are only four pages long, and surprisingly complete. The scope of the rules is small, however, so that while what's there is complete, there ain't much to it. Save your money."

== Reviews ==
- Dragon #52
