= Major Stars =

American psychedelic rock band

- Performing at Terrastock 7, in Louisville 2008

Background information
- Origin: Greater Boston, Massachusetts, United States
- Genre: Psychedelic rock
- Years active: 1997–present
- Labels: Twisted Village, Important Records, Drag City, Squealer
- Members: Wayne Rogers; Kate Biggar (aka Kate Village); Tom Leonard; Dave Dougan; Casey Keenan; Noell Dorsey
- Past members: Dave Lynch; Sandra Barrett; Amanda Bristow; Hayley Thompson-King

Major Stars is an American psychedelic rock band from greater Boston, Massachusetts. Their first live performance was in 1997 at the inaugural Terrastock Festival in Providence, Rhode Island. They toured Japan in 2000 with Overhang Party. In 2002, they toured with Acid Mothers Temple as an opening act and performed at the South by Southwest Festival in Austin, Texas. In December 2006 they performed at the Thurston Moore curated All Tomorrow's Parties festival in the UK.

In 2003, Major Stars released Live In Europa, a limited edition split LP with Comets on Fire. In 2005 and 2006, the band performed at North East Sticks Together.

On April 28, 2007, Major Stars was the first concert of New York City's WFMU Free Music Series. Previously, on May 9, 2006, Major Stars had performed live in the WFMU studio.

Guitarist Wayne Rogers sang lead vocals on all of the band's releases through 2005's 4, when Sandra Barrett joined to take over those duties. Barrett left the band in 2008 and was replaced by Amanda Bristow, who joined during the recording of the album Return To Form. Vocalist Hayley Thompson-King joined in 2010, and appears on the albums Decibels of Gratitude and Motion Set but has since left the group and the current singer is Noell Dorsey.

== Discography ==
- "Rock Sounds of People" (one-sided LP, 1998 - Twisted Village)
- Rock Revival (1998 - Twisted Village) AMG review
- Space/Time (1999 - Twisted Village)
- Distant Effects (2002 - Squealer)
- Live in Europa (split LP w/ Comets on Fire, 2003 - Plastic Records)
- 4 (2005 - Twisted Village)
- "Black Road" (7", 2005 - Twisted Village)
- Syntoptikon (2006 - Important Records)
- "Portable Freak Factory" (7", 2007 - Important Records)
- Mirror/Messenger (2007 - Drag City)
- Return To Form (2010 - Drag City)
- Decibels of Gratitude (2012 - Important Records, Twisted Village)
- Motion Set (2016 - Drag City)
- Roots of Confusion Seeds of Joy (2019 - Drag City)
- More Colors of Sound (2025 - Drag City)

== Sources ==
- Major Stars at AllMusic
