= Ptolemaic Terrascope =

American music magazine

- Ptolemaic Terrascope logo
- Editor: Phil McMullen (1988–2005); Pat Thomas (2005-07)
- Categories: music
- Frequency: twice a year
- Publisher: Nick Saloman
- First issue: May 1989
- Final issue Number: October 2007; 36
- Company: Woronzow Records
- Country: England (1989–2005); USA (2007)
- Based in: Melksham, Wiltshire; Oakland, California (2007)
- Language: English
- Website: http://www.terrascope.co.uk/
- ISSN: 1472-9369

Ptolemaic Terrascope is a magazine covering old and new music, usually of a psychedelic nature. It has been published irregularly since 1989. Originally published by the Woronzow record label, it covers a wide variety of bands and artists from the 1960s to the present day. Issues typically come with a 7" vinyl record or latterly a CD, and sometimes also special inserts such as artwork, scrap books, and discount coupons.

In March 2005, editor Phil McMullen announced that the magazine would be coming under new management and relocating from Britain to North America. The terrascope.co.uk domain name has been retained by McMullen for the website Terrascope Online, featuring reviews, interviews, articles and artwork by the majority of the former Ptolemaic Terrascope staff.

The Terrascope Online website also acts as a focus for the semi-annual Terrastock indie rock festivals which, since 1997, Phil McMullen has curated.

According to the magazine, the name Ptolemaic Terrascope has no real meaning. Their official web page explains, "Ptolemy is a tortoise who lives at Terrascope Towers. Terrascope is a word Phil made up because (a) it matched the artwork we'd designed for the first issue, and (b) we like the Captain Beefheart song 'Tarotplane'."

Additionally to the online magazine, McMullen started a new letterpress-printed music magazine, the Terrascopædia in 2012.

== Personnel ==
- Phil McMullen, editor (print issues from 1988–2005, since then online as Terrascope Online)
- Pat Thomas, editor (one print issue, 2007)

== See also ==
- Terrastock
