= Jandek on Corwood =

2003 film

- Directed by: Chad Freidrichs
- Produced by: Chad Freidrichs; Paul Fehler
- Starring: John Trubee; Phil Milstein; Katy Vine; Dr. Demento; Gary Pig Gold
- Distributed by: Unicorn Stencil
- Release date: February 2003
- Running time: 88 minutes
- Country: United States
- Language: English

Jandek on Corwood is a documentary about veteran reclusive folk/blues artist Jandek. Unlike most popular music documentaries, the subject himself is not seen in the film in any way; instead, various critics, disc jockeys and journalists, many of whom have had some contact with the notoriously reclusive artist, discuss Jandek, his equally mysterious independent record label Corwood Industries, and his music (which reached 39 albums at the end of 2004).

While Jandek himself does not appear in the movie (except in the form of the pictures on many of his album covers and in excerpts from the only phone interview he has ever done in his career, with musician and writer John Trubee for Spin magazine in 1985), he did authorize and endorse the project through Corwood Industries (any correspondence to the artist is usually signed "Corwood" rather than "Jandek"), allow the filmmakers to use whatever recordings from his discography they saw fit, and suggest people that could be interviewed for the documentary.

The film ends with the mention of the release of his 2002 album I Threw You Away; after the film's release in theaters, this album and its succeeding four releases are excerpted in a bonus feature on the DVD.

The film only saw limited theatrical release, as the producers planned to distribute the film primarily as a DVD. The DVD release contains several bonus features, including an album cover commentary on Jandek's albums from 1978 to 2001, the full tape of the John Trubee interview, all of the printed reviews of Jandek's albums from OP and Option magazines, and other materials.

== Jandek songs used in the film ==
1. "Ghost Town by the Sea" from Graven Image
2. "Naked In The Afternoon" from Ready for the House (Sample lyric: "I got a vision of a teenage daughter who's growing up naked in the afternoon")
3. "What Did I Hear?" from Later On (played during spinning record visual, spiraling into center hole; snippet from printed review describing music as "suicidal void". Sample lyric: "you deceived me mister, it sure seems that way...I guess you knew that wasn't possible..I guess there's no such thing as today")
4. "You're The Best One" from Six and Six (Sample lyric: "you're the last one I want to see...you're one in a million")
5. "Niagara Blues" from The Living End (Sample lyric: "Sometimes I go to Niagara, sometimes I go to the grave")
6. "The Beginning" from The Beginning (solo piano, played over album cover discussion)
7. "They Told Me About You" from Ready for the House (discussing the Jandek on Corwood print ad)
8. "Om" from Somebody in the Snow (Wordless chant/cry with multiple overdubbed vocalizations, discussing theories of his mental health and reclusiveness)
9. "Nancy Sings" from Chair Beside a Window (discussing first use of outside musicians)
10. "John Plays Drums" from Your Turn to Fall
11. Down in a Mirror" from Chair Beside a Window (discussing the way to listen to Jandek—“having a few glasses of wine and sitting down with Jandek and just listening”. Sample lyric: “we can’t deny there’s spirits in this house you shut the door the wind closes two more”)
12. "Upon The Grandeur" from One Foot in the North (electric guitar)
13. "Point Judith" from Six and Six (Representative of “1st period”. Sample lyric: “settle back easy and make up your mind to stay”)
14. "Governor Rhodes" from "Telegraph Melts" (Representative of “2nd period”. Sample lyric: We are here in earth in life in sky in magic in rain in love in fire in celebration)
15. "I Passed by the Building" from Blue Corpse (Representative of “3rd Period”)
16. "Rain in Madison" from Glad to Get Away (Representative of “3rd Period”.)
17. "I Need Your Life" from Put My Dream on This Planet (Representative of Spoken Word/A Cappella album trilogy)
18. "You Didn't Lie" from Nine-Thirty (Discussing mystery of Jandek as being part of the appreciation of the music. Sample lyric: “I got someplace that was very hard to get out of Didn’t get too close Wouldn’t get too close”)
19. "I'm Ready" from On The Way (More standard acoustic strumming and chords than typical of Jandek style.)
20. "Pending Doom" from I Woke Up (Texas Monthly interview. Percussion and voice only.)
21. "Walking in the Meadow" from White Box Requiem (Texas Monthly interview continued). Staccato plucking on acoustic guitar, no vocals.
22. "The Electric End" from Lost Cause
23. Another excerpt of "The Beginning" from The Beginning appears again.
24. "I Went Outside" from Put My Dream on This Planet
25. "New Town" from New Town (Dr. Demento discussing how the Jandek story will end. Sample lyric: “I thought I would send you the last song I wrote”)
26. "Only Lover" from Blue Corpse (Discussing fame and the dashing of your expectations about an enigmatic person. Sample lyric: “worst I had to tell you was I followed you here”)
27. "I Knew You Would Leave" from Six and Six (Jandek says this is “the one that I think had the most impact out of everything so far, the one that I thought had the best poetry” in 1985 telephone interview.)
