= Naked in the Afternoon: A Tribute to Jandek =

Studio album by various artists/Summersteps Records
- Released: 2000
- Recorded: 1999–2000
- Genre: Outsider music
- Length: 78:12
- Label: Summersteps Records
- Producer: various producers
- Compiler: Eric Schlittler

Various artists/Summersteps Records chronology
Naked in the Afternoon: A Tribute to Jandek (2000)	Down in a Mirror: A Second Tribute to Jandek (2005)

Professional ratings
Review scores
Source	Rating
Pitchfork Media	5.5/10 link

Naked in the Afternoon: A Tribute to Jandek is a tribute album compiled by Moscow, PA-based independent record label Summersteps Records. The album features cover versions of songs by the reclusive avant-folk/blues singer/songwriter Jandek. Many of the artists are members of the Summersteps roster or fans forming one-time combos to participate on the album, but the album also features contributions from Sonic Youth's Thurston Moore (as part of a one-time combo called Dapper), Low, and Bright Eyes.

All of the songs are covers of songs from Jandek's back catalog, with the exception of Bright Eyes' contribution, a Conor Oberst original called "Have You Ever Heard of Jandek?", and part of the contribution by the act Monster Island, "Road To Corwood", which is performed as a medley with the Jandek composition "Lost Cause". Through his Corwood Industries label, Jandek gave full permission to cover his material and, at Summersteps' request, contributed two disposable camera's worth of photos for use as cover art that emulated the singer/songwriter's own record/CD releases.

== Track listing ==
1. "Quinn Boys II" (from You Walk Alone)
  - Performed by Peter Weiss & Brian Charles
2. "Painted My Teeth" (from Modern Dances)
  - Performed by Dapper (including Thurston Moore on guitars)
3. "Babe I Love You" (from Lost Cause)
  - Performed by The Couple Scene
4. "New Town" (from New Town)
  - Performed by Retsin
5. "Spanish in Me" (from Foreign Keys)
  - Performed by Cassie Rose and The Pickled Punks
6. "Twenty"-Four (from Telegraph Melts)
  - Performed by "Youth Aflame" (The Choppers)
7. "Carnival Queen" (from Modern Dances)
  - Performed by Low
8. "Harmonica" (from Blue Corpse)
  - Performed by Ho Chen Keit
9. "She Fell Down" (from Living in a Moon So Blue)
  - Performed by Kid Icarus
10. "Remain the Same" (from Graven Image)
  - Performed by The Early Morning Initials
11. "Take It Easy" (from I Woke Up)
  - Performed by Gary Young
12. "The I Woke Up Medley" (from I Woke Up)
  - Performed by Psychiatrone Rhonedakk
13. "Nancy Sings" (from Chair Beside a Window)
  - Performed by Ivory Elephant
14. "Janitor's Dead" (from The Living End)
  - Performed by Las Vegas on Mars
15. "War Dance" (from You Walk Alone)
  - Performed by The Goblins
16. "Sailors" (from Living in a Moon So Blue)
  - Performed by Amasa
17. "Road to Corwood/Lost Cause" (from Foreign Keys) (Monster Island/Jandek)
  - Performed by Monster Island
18. "Cave in on You" (from Ready for the House)
  - Performed by The Storkettes
19. "Jessica" (from Later On)
  - Performed by Pipes You See, Pipes You Don't
20. "Have You Ever Heard of Jandek?" (Conor Oberst)
  - Performed by Bright Eyes
21. "Your Condition" (from Later On)
  - Performed by Amy Denio

All songs written by Jandek except where otherwise noted.

== Album personnel ==
- Executive Producer: Eric Schlittler
- Mastering: Barry P. Saranchuk & Ted Baird
