= Down in a Mirror: A Second Tribute to Jandek =

Studio album by various artists/Summersteps Records
- Released: 2005
- Recorded: September 21, 2004 – February 17, 2005
- Genre: Outsider music
- Length: 77:27
- Label: Summersteps Records
- Producer: Various
- Compiler: Eric Schlitter

Various artists/Summersteps Records chronology
Naked in the Afternoon: A Tribute to Jandek (2000)	Down in a Mirror: A Second Tribute to Jandek (2005)

Professional ratings
Review scores
Source	Rating
Allmusic	(3.5/5)
Pitchfork Media	(7.6)

Down in a Mirror: A Second Tribute to Jandek is a tribute album compiled by Moscow, PA-based independent record label Summersteps Records, released as a follow-up to the label's first Jandek tribute, Naked in the Afternoon. As with Naked in the Afternoon, Down In A Mirror features cover versions of songs by the reclusive avant-folk/blues singer/songwriter Jandek. Some of the artists are members of the Summersteps roster or fans forming one-time combos to participate on the album, but the album also features contributions from Wilco's Jeff Tweedy, Six Organs of Admittance (reportedly a favorite modern act of Jandek's, according to the "unauthorized" Texas Monthly interview), The Mountain Goats, Kawabata Makoto of Acid Mothers Temple, Lewis & Clarke and Okkervil River.

All of the songs are covers of songs from Jandek's back catalog, with the exception of the contribution by the act Dirty Projectors, an original song called "With U Icon (An Homage)". As with the first Summersteps-led tribute album, Jandek gave full permission to cover his material through his Corwood Industries label and, at Summersteps' request, contributed some photographs taken by the singer/songwriter for the CD's cover art that emulates Jandek's own record/CD releases.

The recording, compilation, and release of Down In A Mirror came in the wake of both the acclaimed documentary Jandek on Corwood and Jandek's own sudden surprise foray into live performance, and as a result gained more attention than the original tribute album.

Three of the songs on the compilation, "Nancy Sings", "Babe I Love You", and "Cave In On You", were also covered on Naked in the Afternoon five years earlier, and two songs, "You Painted Your Teeth" and "Babe I Love You" are covered twice (in different arrangements) on this album - a slight curiosity given the fact that at the time the last contribution to this album was finished in February 2005, Corwood Industries had released over 40 albums of Jandek material.

== Track listing ==
1. "Crack a Smile" (from Lost Cause) – 3:35
  - Performed by Jeff Tweedy (of Wilco).
2. "You Painted Your Teeth" (from Telegraph Melts) – 2:36
  - Performed by Live Show Rabbits
3. "The Dunes" (from Worthless Recluse) – 2:04
  - Performed by Eric Gaffney
4. "Your Other Man" (from Blue Corpse) – 5:17
  - Performed by Okkervil River
5. "Message to the Clerk" (from On The Way) – 3:43
  - Performed by Brother JT
6. "I'll Sit Alone and Think a lot About You" (from On the Way) – 4:31
  - Performed by Six Organs of Admittance
7. "Cave in on You/European Jewel" (Incomplete) (both from Ready for the House) – 5:06
  - Performed by Home for the Def
8. "Down in a Mirror" (from Chair Beside a Window) – 3:34
  - Performed by The Marshmallow Staircase
9. "White Box" (from White Box Requiem) – 2:51
  - Performed by The Mountain Goats
10. "Aimless Breeze" (from Worthless Recluse) – 2:40
  - Performed by George Parsons
11. "Nancy Sings" (from Chair Beside a Window) – 4:47
  - Performed by Lewis & Clarke
12. "Naked in the Afternoon" (from Ready for the House) – 2:45
  - Performed by Jack Norton
13. "Sung" (from Interstellar Discussion) – 1:46
  - Performed by Rivulets
14. "Babe I Love You" (from Lost Cause) – 4:31
  - Performed by Kawabata Makoto
15. "The Spirit" (from Interstellar Discussion) – 4:01
  - Performed by Wayside Drive
16. "Just Die" (from I Woke Up) – 6:48
  - Performed by a Real Knife Head
17. "Van Nuys Mission" (from Glad to Get Away) – 2:51
  - Performed by Ross Beach
18. "I Found the Right Change" (from The Gone Wait) – 1:46
  - Performed by Multi-Panel
19. "Babe I Love You" (from Lost Cause) – 2:44
  - Performed by Dan Melchior
20. "You Painted Your Teeth" (from Telegraph Melts) – 4:09
  - Performed by Pothole Skinny
21. "With U Icon" (An Homage) (Dog Longneck) – 5:09
  - Performed by Dirty Projectors

== Personnel ==
- Ted Baird – design, layout design
- Ross Beach – instrumentation
- Brother JT – instrumentation
- Dan Burton – engineer
- Jessica Cowley – engineer
- Jordan Geiger – piano, keyboards
- Gary Pig Gold – liner notes
- Michael Kapinus – bass
- Kawabata Makoto – vocals, hurdygurdy
- Dan Melchior – instrumentation
- The Mountain Goats – guitar, vocals
- Travis Nelsen – drums
- Jack Norton – guitar, vocals, engineer
- George Parsons – vocals
- Rivulets – instrumentation
- Will Sheff – acoustic guitar, vocals
- Jeff Tweedy – bass, guitar, vocals, mellotron
- Jason Woods – drums
- Executive producer: Eric Schlittler
- Layout and design: Ted Baird
- Mastering: Dan McKinney
