= The Rocks Crumble =

Studio album by Jandek
- Released: 1983
- Recorded: Unknown
- Genre: Rock, garage rock, folk, outsider
- Length: 40:00
- Label: Corwood Industries
- Producer: Corwood Industries

Jandek chronology
Your Turn to Fall (1983)	The Rocks Crumble (1983)	Interstellar Discussion (1984)

Professional ratings
Review scores
Source	Rating
AllMusic	3/5 stars
Op Magazine issue W	Neutral

The Rocks Crumble is the eighth Jandek album, released as Corwood 0746. It is his third release of 1983, and is the first Jandek album to feature extensive use of drums and electric guitar. It was reissued on CD in 2001.

== Overview ==
The Rocks Crumble marks the beginning of what is often referenced as Corwood's "first electric period," since the majority of the album is played on electric guitar with clattering, earsplitting drums behind it. That said, Jandek eases us into this new phase gently, and its approach echoes the cover, in which an old Slingerland drum set is seen in a blurry, black and white photograph. For the next album, Interstellar Discussion, we get up close and personal with the same drum set (which appears frequently on Corwood covers), this time in full color.

The album starts like the prior seven, with an acoustic track. "Faceless" is an "invisible man" song in which the vocalist laments "He wouldn’t even look into my eyes/he wouldn’t know my name/I seen him several hundred times." This leads into "Birthday," a third variation on the song first recorded on Chair Beside a Window as "Nancy Sings" and on the previous album Your Turn to Fall as "John Plays Drums." Here it is very similar to the first version, but with male vocals. This leads into three oddly-numbered versions of Ready for the House's "European Jewel." The first ("European Jewel 613") is very similar to the one on the debut album, with vocal and electric guitar, though this time the song IS finished. The second ("European Jewel II") appears to be an unfinished take for guitar and drums, or perhaps he was trying to shorten the song to "single length"? Hard to say, but the final version ("European Jewel 501") kicks the pace of the shambling drums (overdubbed, according to the interview with John Trubee, by the same musician) and the song is played to completion.

This is followed by two lyrically different parts to "Message to the Clerk," which is somewhat like early Dylan electric work, with the surreal verses (sample: "and now you're independent/brush your teeth three times a day") leading to the repeating refrain "take a message to the clerk/tell him not to work." This song would be edited and redone for the On the Way album. The rest of the album continues the off-rhythm guitar and drums on more art/garage punk ("Breathtaker") and an attempt at a slower electric track ("Lonesome Company").

== Track listing ==
No.	Title	Length
1.	"Faceless"	2:44
2.	"Birthday"	2:41
3.	"European Jewel 613"	4:54
4.	"European Jewel II"	3:28
5.	"European Jewel 501"	5:05
6.	"Message to the Clerk (Part 1)"	2:42
7.	"Message to the Clerk (Part 2)"	4:27
8.	"Branded on a Telephone"	3:26
9.	"Breathtaker"	4:20
10.	"Lonesome Company"	2:52
11.	"Same Road"	2:47
Total length:		40:00
