= Teenage Head =

Teenage Head may refer to:

- Teenage Head (Flamin' Groovies album), a 1971 album by The Flamin' Groovies, or the title track of that album
- Teenage Head (band), a 1980s Canadian rock band, who were named after the Flamin' Groovies album and song

- Teenage Head (Teenage Head album), first release by the band
