= Live from the Belly of a Dying City =

Video by Kid Icarus
- Genre: Indie rock
- Label: Summersteps Records

From the Summersteps website:

Live from the Belly of a Dying City was filmed in the basement of a Scranton gallery and staged on a brisk Pennsylvania's winter night. The set captures Kid Icarus spinning tall tales reminiscent of Robyn Hitchcock armed with a well worn acoustic. The electrifying full-band set features both reworkings of classics from the Kid Icarus canon as well as brand new tracks from their upcoming album, Imaginary Song and Aluminum Hits.

== Extras ==
The DVD includes the video for "The Murderess" from The Metal West album.
