= Class of 1984 =

1982 film by Mark Lester

- Theatrical release poster
- Directed by: Mark Lester
- Screenplay by: Mark Lester; John Saxton; Tom Holland
- Story by: Tom Holland
- Produced by: Arthur Kent
- Starring: Perry King; Merrie Lynn Ross; Timothy Van Patten; Lisa Langlois; Stefan Arngrim; Michael Fox; Roddy McDowall
- Cinematography: Albert Dunk
- Edited by: Howard Kunin
- Music by: Lalo Schifrin
- Production company: Guerrilla High Productions
- Distributed by: Citadel Films (Canada); United Film Distribution Company (US)
- Release dates: August 20, 1982 (US); June 3, 1983 (Canada)
- Running time: 94 minutes
- Country: Canada
- Language: English
- Budget: $3 million
- Box office: $6.1 million

Class of 1984 is a 1982 Canadian crime thriller film directed by Mark Lester, produced by Arthur Kent, and co-written by Tom Holland and John Saxton, based on a story by Holland. It stars Perry King, Merrie Lynn Ross (who also served as an executive producer), Timothy Van Patten, Lisa Langlois, Stefan Arngrim, Michael J. Fox, and Roddy McDowall.

The film featured various youth fashions of the time, including the punk look, an image that was still popular in the early 1980s. The theme song, "I Am the Future", was recorded for the film by Alice Cooper. The film also features a performance by Canadian punk band Teenage Head.

== Plot ==
Andrew Norris is the new music teacher at Lincoln High School, a troubled inner city school. As he arrives on his first day, he meets fellow teacher Terry Corrigan, who is carrying a gun. When Andrew asks about the firearm, Terry assures him he will learn why the protection is necessary. When they enter the school, Andrew is shocked to see everyone scanned by metal detectors and frisked. He spots a student with a straight razor, but the security guards let the student go because they are so overworked.

The halls of the school are covered with graffiti. Andrew learns he is expected to patrol the halls as a security guard during his off periods. In his first class, a group of five disruptive students are roughhousing and causing trouble. The leader of the gang is Peter Stegman, the only member of the group who is actually registered in that class. They all eventually walk out, and Andrew discovers the rest of the students want to learn, especially Arthur, who plays the trumpet, and Deneen, who plays the clarinet.

As Andrew gets to know the school and the area, he decides to put together an orchestra with his more advanced students. Peter's gang sells drugs and causes all kinds of mayhem, including the death of a student who buys PCP, climbs up a flagpole, and falls off. They follow Andrew home and taunt him one night, spraying a red liquid on his face. Andrew is frustrated, but the school principal is cynical and requires absolute proof of the gang's misconduct to act. The police act similarly.

At school, Andrew is confronted with more and more evidence of Peter's crimes. The two grow increasingly at odds. Eventually, after Peter kills Terry's animals in his lab, Andrew and Peter end up alone in a bathroom. Peter throws himself into a mirror and beats himself, claiming that Andrew attacked him. Trying to clear things up, Andrew visits Peter's mother at home. Frustrated that Peter still plays the victim and his mother will not hear Andrew, he hotwires Peter's car and drives it into a wall.

During lunch, the gang starts a food fight and forces their friend Vinnie to stab Arthur, causing him to be sent to a hospital. Vinnie is arrested and held in a youth detention center. Terry is driven insane after the incident with the animals in his lab and pulls a gun on his students, but is killed after crashing his car when trying to kill Peter and the others.

Andrew's orchestra is about to give its first concert. As his wife, Diane, gets ready at home, Peter's gang breaks into the house and gang rapes her. One of them takes a Polaroid of her being raped and has it delivered to Andrew on the podium just as he is about to start the concert. Horrified by the photo, he runs off the podium in pursuit of Peter's gang; Deneen conducts the orchestra in his absence.

Andrew and the gang chase each other through the school. Andrew kills them off individually, finally confronting Peter on the roof. Their last scuffle ends with Peter falling through a skylight, and after Andrew reaches a hand to help him, Peter attacks him, getting strangled to death in the ropes above the stage. His corpse falls into full view of the audience. An ending caption states that Andrew is never charged because the police could not find a witness to the crime.

== Cast ==
- Perry King as Andrew Norris
- Merrie Lynn Ross as Diane Norris
- Timothy Van Patten as Peter Stegman
- Stefan Arngrim as "Drugstore"
- Michael J. Fox (credited as Michael Fox) as Arthur
- Roddy McDowall as Terry Corrigan
- Keith Knight as "Barnyard"
- Lisa Langlois as Patsy
- Neil Clifford as Fallon
- Al Waxman as Detective Stewiski
- Erin Flannery as Deneen
- David Gardner as Principal Morganthau
- Linda Sorensen as Mrs. Stegman
- Teenage Head as themselves

== Production ==
Mark Lester was inspired to make the film by his memories of The Blackboard Jungle along with visiting his old high school, Monroe High, and seeing how it had changed. Lester devised the plot, which was written up by Tom Holland. Other writers worked on it as well including an uncredited Barry Schneider, who wrote some dialogue.

Financing for the film came from Canada. It began filming at Central Technical School in Toronto on August 17, 1981. Working titles of the film were Battlezone: Adams High and Guerrilla High.

== Soundtrack ==
- Fear: Fresh Flesh
- Fear: Let's Have a War
- Teenage Head: Ain't Got No Sense
- Timothy Van Patten: Stegman's concerto
- Lalo Schifrin and Jeff Baxter: "Suburbanite"
- Lalo Schifrin and Jeff Baxter: "You Better Not Step Out Of Line"
- Lalo Schifrin and Alice Cooper: "I Am The Future"

== Release ==
Class of 1984 was released in the United States on August 20, 1982.

=== Censorship ===
It was originally rated X when submitted to the ratings board, however, after cuts, it eventually received an R rating, although an X-rated version was released in foreign markets.

When it was originally released, the film was banned in several countries due to its lewd content. In the United Kingdom, it received four minutes and fourteen seconds of cuts from the British Board of Film Classification, and was refused a video certificate four years later. It was finally passed fully uncut in 2005. In Finland, the theatrical version was banned in 1983 – the case went up to the Supreme Administrative Court – and an edited video release was similarly banned in 1984. In 2006, an uncut DVD release was approved with an "18" rating.

=== Home media ===
Shout Factory's horror division Scream Factory released the film as a Collector's Edition Blu-ray on April 14, 2015.

== Critical reception ==
On Rotten Tomatoes, the film has a rating of 71% based on 21 reviews, with a weighted average of 6.2/10. Metacritic gave the film a score of 49 based on 11 reviews, indicating "mixed or average" reviews.

Film historian and critic Leonard Maltin described the movie as an "[u]npleasant, calculatedly campy melodrama. ... Still, not bad as revenge movies go". He further characterized the picture as a loose remake of The Blackboard Jungle, with King, Van Patten, and Fox in the roles of Glenn Ford, Vic Morrow, and Sidney Poitier, respectively.

In the Chicago Sun-Times, Roger Ebert wrote: "Class of 1984 is raw, offensive, vulgar, and violent, but it contains the sparks of talent and wit, and it is acted and directed by people who cared to make it special".

A negative review from 1982 in Time stated that the film "no longer terrifies, or even disgusts, the moviegoers for whom it is made... The violence in this vigilante farce is too preposterous to make anyone wince".

== Sequels ==
The film spawned two science fiction sequels. Class of 1999 (1990) by Vestron Pictures was also directed by Mark Lester. Class of 1999 II: The Substitute (1994) by CineTel Films, co-written by Mark Lester, was released direct-to-video by Vidmark Entertainment. The three movies have plots only loosely related to each other.

== Legacy ==
Comedy writer and producer Tom Scharpling has noted that Class of 1984 is one of his favorite films. Scharpling would often reference the movie on his weekly call-in radio program The Best Show on WFMU.

Mark Lester later said "I thought Van Patten was going to be the big acting star, and it turned out to be Michael J. Fox instead."

Timothy Van Patten wrote and plays Stegman's concerto, later performed on the UK music competition TV series, The Piano by a music school dinner lady in Liverpool Street Station, London.
