= Later On =

Studio album by Jandek
- Released: 1981
- Genre: Folk, blues, outsider
- Length: 41:58
- Label: Corwood Industries
- Producer: Corwood Industries

Jandek chronology
Six and Six (1981)	Later On (1981)	Chair Beside a Window (1982)

Professional ratings
Review scores
Source	Rating
AllMusic	link
Forced Exposure	(favorable) link
Op	(neutral) link

Later On is the third studio album by American singer-songwriter Jandek, and the second released by Corwood Industries (#0741) in 1981. It was reissued on CD in 2000.

As with the prior Six and Six (and most of Ready for the House), this is a stark acoustic and vocals album with roots in Delta blues. Unlike the first two, however, the pace is picked up a bit, and there are other musicians present, or the harmonica appearing for the first time may be overdubbed.

The song "The Janitor" would receive a sequel eight years later on the album The Living End with the song "Janitor's Dead."

== Track listing ==
No.	Title	Length
1.	"Your Condition"	5:29
2.	"What Did I Hear"	4:41
3.	"Just Whisper"	3:48
4.	"Oh Jenny"	3:55
5.	"Until Then"	2:40
6.	"So Fly, Max"	2:55
7.	"The Janitor"	3:29
8.	"Don't Know if I Care"	2:22
9.	"John Came"	1:14
10.	"Jessica"	2:36
11.	"Jackson's Gone Down the Mississippi"	2:42
12.	"The Second End"	3:21
Total length:		41:58
