= Be My Echo =

Studio album by Kid Icarus
- Released: 2002
- Genre: Indie rock
- Length: 68:47
- Label: Summersteps Records
- Producer: Barry P. Saranchuk

Kid Icarus chronology
Maps of the Saints (1999)	Be My Echo (2002)	The Metal West (2005)

Be My Echo is the second studio album by Kid Icarus, released in 2002 by Summersteps Records. The liner notes and packaging were designed and laid out by the keyboard player/guitarist Ted Baird. The names of the last three tracks are not listed on the album.

== Reception ==
Music critic Matt Fink of AllMusic criticized the album's length, saying it "would endlessly benefit by cutting its 22 tracks in half, its sprawl is a bit hard to digest despite the presence of generally pleasant songwriting and a few winning tracks." Fink added that while the album's songs experiment in different musical styles, Kid Icarus "never really reveals a sound that seems to suit him." Diamond City Weekly writer Gene Padden said that "to find out it was recorded in a bedroom via 4-track was shocking, and damn impressive."

== Track listing ==
All songs written by Eric Schlittler, except as listed

1. "Guess We Ate Too Much" – 3:16
2. "Rotary Dial" – 3:23
3. "The Confetti After the Party" – 4:09
4. "La Petite da Da" – 3:47, by Schlittler/Kobeski
5. "God Knows What She's Seen" – 3:16
6. "You're an Unidentified Flying Object" – 3:38, by Roky Erickson
7. "The Squeeze" – 3:01
8. "Painted by Numbers" –1:18
9. "X-Ray Technician" – 3:07
10. "Perhaps She Was Perfect" – 2:50, by Schlittler/Johnson
11. "Be My Echo" – 3:56, by Schlittler/Kobeski
12. "Petrified Forest" – 2:03
13. "Meet Me on Via Roma" – 4:35
14. "A Date with a Dentist" – 3:30
15. "She Digs Turtle Soup" – 2:04, by Kobeski/Schlittler
16. "Broken Eyes" – 2:17
17. "Her Silver Chalice" – 3:05
18. "Combustion" – 4:12
19. "Leave on a Light" – 2:43
20. "Sea Song" – 4:40
21. "Sea Song II" – 2:59
22. "Tentacle Slips" – 1:03

== Personnel ==
- Eric Schlittler – guitar, harmonica, voice
- Cassie Rose (Kobeski) – voice on tracks 4, 12, and 16
- Jason Johnson – drums, guitar, keyboard
- Ted Baird – keyboard, guitar
