= Follow Your Footsteps =

Studio album by Jandek
- Released: 1986
- Recorded: unknown
- Genre: Folk rock, experimental, outsider
- Length: 44:07
- Label: Corwood Industries
- Producer: Corwood Industries

Jandek chronology
| Telegraph Melts (1986) | Follow Your Footsteps (1986) | Modern Dances (1987) |

Professional ratings
Review scores
| Source | Rating |
|---|---|
| Forced Exposure No. 12 | (favorable) link |
| Sound Choice #8 | (not rated) link |
| Away From The Pulsebeat, 1988 | (favorable) link |
| AllMusic | link |

Follow Your Footsteps is the second album released in 1986, and thirteenth overall, by avant- folk/ blues singer-songwriter Jandek. The album was released as Corwood Industries No. 0751.

== Track listing ==
| No. | Title | Length |
|---|---|---|
| 1. | "Honey" | 3:13 |
| 2. | "What Do You Want To Sing?" | 2:09 |
| 3. | "Jaws of Murmur" | 5:26 |
| 4. | "Preacher" | 3:13 |
| 5. | "Didn't Ask Why" | 4:04 |
| 6. | "Leave All You Have" | 3:46 |
| 7. | "I Know You Well" | 3:06 |
| 8. | "Dearly Need Some Words" | 4:02 |
| 9. | "Straight Thirty Seconds" | 2:40 |
| 10. | "Bring on Fatima" | 2:41 |
| 11. | "For Today" | 3:55 |
| 12. | "Collection" | 3:44 |
| 13. | "We're All Through" | 1:24 |
| Total length: | | 44:07 |
