= Staring at the Cellophane =

Studio album by Jandek
- Released: 1982
- Genres: Folk, blues, outsider
- Length: 41:24
- Label: Corwood Industries
- Producer: Corwood Industries

Jandek chronology
| Living in a Moon So Blue (1982) | Staring at the Cellophane (1982) | Your Turn to Fall (1983) |

Professional ratings
Review scores
| Source | Rating |
|---|---|
| AllMusic | link |
| Forced Exposure | very favorable link |

Staring at the Cellophane is the sixth Jandek album, and his third of 1982. It was released as Corwood 0744. It was reissued on CD in 2001.

The cover image appears to be the same picture taken for his previous album, Living in a Moon So Blue, only from a different angle.

This album finds the artist using the technique of repeated lyrics more frequently than before, with songs like "Sand I" ("You're stuck in the sand/Go home"), "I See Lights" ("I see red lights/I see green lights"), and "Michael", whose lyrics "Michael, Michael, where are you now" would be copped by the band Red House Painters ten years later in their song of the same name.

== Track listing ==
| No. | Title | Length |
|---|---|---|
| 1. | "Michael" | 2:57 |
| 2. | "This is for You" | 3:09 |
| 3. | "Riddles Riddling Me" | 2:47 |
| 4. | "Basic Themes" | 2:50 |
| 5. | "I See Lights" | 2:31 |
| 6. | "Rather Be Blind" | 1:51 |
| 7. | "Away" | 2:18 |
| 8. | "Don't Get Too Upset" | 2:30 |
| 9. | "A Letter" | 2:21 |
| 10. | "Nevermore" | 3:01 |
| 11. | "Sand I" | 2:14 |
| 12. | "Nepoleon in Russia" | 3:07 |
| 13. | "Split to the East" | 2:55 |
| 14. | "Number 14" | 2:52 |
| 15. | "Blood and Bone" | 3:15 |
| Total length: | | 41:24 |
