= Edgar Breau =

- Origin: Ontario, Canada
- Genres: Rock
- Occupations: Singer, guitarist
- Instruments: Vocals, guitar

Edgar Breau is a musician in Ontario, Canada. He was a member of the Hamilton-based band Simply Saucer in the 1970s, and has released a number of solo albums.

In 1974, Simply Saucer recorded a demo tape of music under the supervision of Robert Lanois which combined psychedelic, Krautrock and early punk influences (Syd Barrett, the Velvet Underground and Iggy Pop have been cited as among the band's influences). The band broke up in 1979, and their recording was not released until 1989 as Cyborgs Revisited.

Cyborgs Revisited was first issued on CD in 1992, by the Chicago-based Fistpuppet label. A remastered edition, with additional material from the 1977-1979 version of Simply Saucer, was issued in 2003 by Hamilton's Sonic Unyon label.

In 2004, Breau issued a solo album entitled Canadian Primitive. Recorded over a period of 14 years at Grant Avenue Studios in Hamilton, the album was generally described as folk-psychedelia. On September 16, 2006, the 1978-79 line-up of the Saucer, featuring ex-Teenage Head guitarist, Steve "Sparky" Park, reunited for a six-song cameo appearance at the Corktown Tavern in Hamilton.

A new edition of Saucer has been created featuring original bassist Kevin Christoff, guitarist Steve Foster, theremin/electronics/guitarist Dan Wintermans, and drummer Joe Csontos. A new album, Half Human, Half Live, was released in 2008.

Breau campaigned for the Legislative Assembly of Ontario in the 1999 Ontario provincial election, as a candidate for the right-wing, socially conservative Family Coalition Party. He received 386 votes (1.16%) in Hamilton East, finishing well behind the winner, Dominic Agostino of the Liberal Party.
