= Maps of the Saints =

Studio album by Kid Icarus
- Released: 1999
- Genre: Indie rock
- Length: 45:03
- Label: Summersteps Records
- Producer: Barry P. Saranchuk

Kid Icarus chronology
Summer 98 (1998)	Maps of the Saints (1999)	Be My Echo (2002)

Maps of the Saints is the debut studio album by Kid Icarus. It was first released in 1999 through Summersteps Records on cassette and CD-R, and was re-issued in 2003. The liner notes and packaging were laid out by Ted Baird, who would later join the band as a musician. The relief print by Cassie Rose Kobeski on the cover is entitled "Sunday Dinner".

== Reception ==
AllMusic writer John D. Luerssen noted various influences on the album, from The Beatles to Robyn Hitchcock. Luerssen also praised the ballads "Firecracker Girls" and "Matchsticks Dance". Writer Matt Fink, also of Allmusic, compared the album's lo-fi style and "off-the-wall songcraft" to Robert Pollard. Tom Schulte of Skratch Magazine described a contrast between songs on the album, some which "bask in a harsh sun of feedback and distortion . . . while others display a sad and somewhat psychedelic mood."

== Track listing ==
All songs written by Eric Schlittler, except as listed

1. "Last Chance For A Painting" – 2:04
2. "Laughing Skeletons" – 3:39
3. "Firecracker Girls" – 3:46
4. "Bicycle Spokes" – 5:03
5. "Matchsticks Dance" – 2:07
6. "Kafka Song" – 2:22, by Kobeski/Schlittler
7. "Women In Films" – 2:25
8. "Piece Of Trash" – 1:52
9. "Lost In 228" – 1:30
10. "Ice Queen" – 5:27
11. "Holiday" – 2:08, by Brothers Gibb
12. "Bells And Whistles" – 3:54
13. "Your Photograph" – 3:04
14. "Pieces On A Board" – 5:42

== Personnel ==
- Eric Schlittler – guitar, vocals, harmonica, organ, percussion
- Steve Guse – drums on tracks 2 and 7
- Cassie Rose Kobeski – vocals on tracks 6 and 13
- Kevin Stevens – guitar on track 9
- Psychatrone Rhonedakk – tabla on track 3
