= The Narrow Road =

The Narrow Road may refer to:

- The Narrow Road (1912 film), American short silent film
- The Narrow Road (2022 film), Hong Kong film
- "Narrow Road", a 2020 song by NLE Choppa

== See also ==
- This Narrow Road, a 2001 album by Jandek
