= The Living End (disambiguation) =

The Living End is an Australian punk rock/psychobilly band.

The Living End may also refer to:

In music:

- The Living End (Hüsker Dü album), 1994
- The Living End (Jandek album), 1989
- The Living End (The Living End album), 1998
- "The Living End", a song by the Jesus and Mary Chain from Psychocandy
- "The Living End", a song by Bongwater from Too Much Sleep

In other media:

- The Living End (film), a 1992 film by Gregg Araki
- The Living End (TV series), a 1972 unsold TV pilot starring Louis Gossett Jr.
- The Living End, a 1979 novel by Stanley Elkin
