= Simply Saucer =

Canadian musical group

- Origin: Hamilton, Ontario, Canada
- Genres: Proto-punk, psychedelic rock, garage rock
- Years active: 1973–1979, 2006–present
- Members: Edgar Breau - lead vocals, guitar Kevin Christoff - bass Mike Trebilcock - guitar, synths Colina Phillips - back-up vocals, synths Ed Roth - keys Paul Panchezak - drums Glenn Milchem - drums
- Past members: Chris Jamieson; John LaPlante; Don Cramer; Steve Park; Dave Byers; Paul Collili; Neil DeMarchant; Tony Cutaia; Peter Lacey; Stephen Foster; Joe Csontos; Dan Winterman
- Website: www.simplysaucer.com

Simply Saucer is a Canadian rock band formed during the 1970s. Based in Hamilton, Ontario, the band consisted of guitarist and vocalist Edgar Breau, keyboardist John LaPlante (billed by the stage name Ping Romany), bass guitarist Kevin Christoff, and drummer Neil DeMarchant. The band's style has been described as a hybrid of proto-punk and psychedelia and they form a "Rust-belt punk" style, along with The Stooges, MC5, and Alice Cooper. The group's references also included German progressive rock, or Krautrock, and early electronic music pioneers such as Karlheinz Stockhausen.

According to Matt Carlson at Allmusic, "Though Simply Saucer had the guts to bring together tremendous influences from rock's past, including the Velvet Underground, early Pink Floyd, and the Stooges, the band was hardly noticed outside of its local area."

== History ==
Formed in 1973, the band was originally a six-piece, largely improvisational, outfit featuring Dave Byers and Paul Collili. The name Simply Saucer was chosen in tribute to the Pink Floyd album A Saucerful of Secrets.

By October 1973, the band contracted into a four-piece. DeMarchant left the band in 1975, and was replaced by Tony Cutaia, who in turn left in 1976 and was replaced by Don Cramer. Romany left the band in 1976. Guitarist Steve "Sparky" Park, formerly of Teenage Head, joined in 1977.

In its lifetime, the band only released one 7" single, "She's a Dog/I Can Change My Mind" in 1978 on fanzine magnate Gary Pig Gold's Pig Label, before breaking up in July 1979. Following the band's breakup, Breau continued as a solo artist, while other band members went on to form The Other One. Breau later ran as a candidate for the Family Coalition Party of Ontario in the 1999 provincial election.

An abortive recording session with producers Daniel Lanois and Bob Lanois from 1974 and a June 28, 1975 concert performance on the roof of Jackson Square were later compiled for the 1989 album Cyborgs Revisited. Cyborgs quickly came to be regarded as a lost classic of Canadian music, being named one of the greatest Canadian albums of all time by the magazines Chart, Forced Exposure, Pop Matters, and Alternative Press, as well as appearing as the 36th best Canadian album in Bob Mersereau's 2007 book The Top 100 Canadian Albums. The need to capture the band's unconventional sonics has also been credited as one of the first catalysts for the development of Daniel Lanois' distinctive production style, which would eventually make him one of the most influential record producers in the world.

Cyborgs was subsequently reissued on Sonic Unyon in 2003, with several bonus tracks including the 1978 single.

Breau, Christoff, and Park reunited for a show at Hamilton's Corktown Tavern on September 17, 2006, with Joe Csontos on drums. Park works in Montreal, and could not commit to a full-blown reunion, so new members Stephen Foster on guitar and Dan Wintermans on guitar, keyboard and theremin, were brought in. The group released a new album, Half Human, Half Live, in April 2008.

After a short tour of the U.S.A, which included a June 15 appearance at Terrastock, drummer Csontos left the line-up, followed by Dan Winterman and original bassist Kevin Christoff in August 2009. Still, a version of Simply Saucer featuring drummer Peter Lacey and bassist Chris Jamieson performed a couple of live dates in October 2009, including the Scion Garage Festival. Current incarnations of the band have been playing shows in the Hamilton area as of 2012.

In 2013 and 2014, their singles "Bullet Proof Nothing" and "Reckless Agitation" were reissued on Mammoth Cave Recording Co.

== Discography ==
- She's A Dog/I Can Change My Mind (1978)
- Cyborgs Revisited (1989; reissued on CD by Fistpuppet/Cargo 1991)
- Cyborgs Revisited (2003; expanded to include 45 and post 1976 demos)
- Half Human, Half Live (2008)
- Saucerland (2009)
- Baby Nova EP (2014)
