= Cyborgs Revisited =

Compilation album by Simply Saucer
- Released: 1989
- Genre: Proto-Punk
- Label: Mole Sound Records and Cargo Records
- Producer: Daniel Lanois, Bob Lanois

Cyborgs Revisited is an album by Simply Saucer, released in 1989 on Mole Sound Records and Cargo Records. It was compiled from various archival recordings by the band, who had only ever released one 7" single before breaking up in 1979. The album's first side was an unreleased demo produced by Daniel Lanois and Bob Lanois in 1974, and the album's second side was a 1975 concert recorded on the roof of Hamilton's Jackson Square.

== Impact ==
Cyborgs quickly came to be regarded as a lost classic of Canadian music, frequently being named one of the greatest Canadian albums of all time. It ranked 48th in Chart magazine's 1996 reader poll of the greatest Canadian albums, and 36th in Bob Mersereau's 2007 book The Top 100 Canadian Albums.

Forced Exposure, Pop Matters, Pitchfork Media and Alternative Press have also hailed the album as a classic.

Julian Cope named Cyborgs his album of the month on Head Heritage in May 2001, and Sonic Youth once announced on stage, during a concert in Hamilton, that the show was dedicated to Simply Saucer.

== Reissue ==
The album was reissued in 2003 on Sonic Unyon, with additional bonus tracks including the band's lone single release.

== Track listing ==
1. Instant Pleasure
2. Electro Rock
3. Nazi Apocalypse
4. Mole Machine
5. Bullet Proof Nothing
6. Here Come the Cyborgs (Part 1)
7. Here Come the Cyborgs (Part 2)
8. Dance the Mutation
9. Illegal Bodies

=== Bonus tracks on 2003 reissue ===
1. Low Profile (Demo)
2. Little Sally (Demo)
3. Get My Thrills (Demo)
4. I Take It (Demo)
5. Yes I Do (Live)
6. Bullet Proof Nothing (Live)
7. Now's the Time for the Party (Live)
8. I Can Change My Mind
9. She's a Dog
