= Some Kinda Fun =

Studio album by Teenage Head
- Released: 1982
- Genre: Punk rock; new wave
- Length: 35:07
- Label: Attic
- Producer: Brian Christian

Teenage Head chronology
Frantic City (1980)	Some Kinda Fun (1982)	Tornado (1983)

Singles from Some Kinda Fun
- 1. "Some Kinda Fun"; 2. "Let's Go to Hawaii"

Professional ratings
Review scores
Source	Rating
Allmusic	2/5 stars

Some Kinda Fun is the third studio album by Teenage Head, released in 1982. It was one of the Top 100 albums in Canada of 1982. The album was certified Gold in Canada on April 28, 2014.

== Track listing ==
All tracks are written by Gordon Lewis, Steve Mahon, Nick Stipanitz, Frankie "Venom" Kerr unless otherwise indicated

No.	Title	Writer(s)	Length
1.	"Drivin' Wild (My Invader)"		4:48
2.	"Let's Go to Hawaii"	Bill Dobslaw, The Rivieras	2:24
3.	"Sheila Scarf"		3:45
4.	"Want You to Know"		3:00
5.	"Teenage Beer Drinking Party"		3:32
6.	"Shag Shack"		4:00
7.	"Sick Little Man"		3:15
8.	"Some Kinda Fun"	Jim Lee, Chris Montez	2:39
9.	"Fist to Face"		3:17
10.	"Don't Toy with Me"		2:40
11.	"Let It Show"		2:47
Total length:			35:07

== Personnel ==
- Frankie Venom (Kerr) - vocals, harmonica
- Gordon Lewis - guitar
- Steve Mahon - bass
- Nick Stipanitz - drums, vocals, backing vocals

Production

- Brian Christian - producer
- Ringo Hyrcyna - engineer
- Hayward Parrott - remix engineer
- David Bendeth - mixing
- Recorded at Nimbus/Sound Stage Studios, Toronto
- Remixed at Manta Sound, Toronto

== Chart positions ==
=== Album ===
Year	Chart	Position
1982	RPM	18

=== Singles ===
Year	Song	RPM Chart Position
1982	"Some Kinda Fun"	23
