= Gary Pig Gold =

Canadian musician, record producer and writer (born 1955)

- Born: 30 May 1955 (age 71); Toronto, Ontario, Canada
- Genre: Punk rock
- Occupations: Singer-songwriter; record producer; filmmaker; author; journalist
- Years active: 1973–present

Gary Pig Gold (born 30 May 30 1955, in Toronto, Ontario) is a Canadian singer-songwriter, record producer, filmmaker, author and journalist. His fanzine The Pig Paper was Canada's second independently-published music magazine, and among the recording artists he has worked with are Pat Boone, Dave Desroches, Endless Summer, Simply Saucer and Shane Faubert. Gold has written many books on popular music and has contributed to dozens of magazines as well as seven books in the multi-genre MusicHound album guide series. AllMusic describes him as "rock music's all-time hardest-working man ... with all apologies to James Brown".

== Writing and publishing ==
Under his pen name, Gold began self-publishing the fanzine The Pig Paper in 1973 and distributing it by mail to friends. Visiting London two years later, he met Joe Strummer, at the time leading The 101ers, who encouraged Gold to continue his writing. That winter, he published a mock concert program commemorating an appearance by The Who in Toronto, and in 1977, a similar Pig Paper on The Kinks became the first issue to be made available outside of Canada, when Gold followed the band to a concert and record signing in Buffalo, New York.

The featured interviewee of that Pig Paper was Edgar Breau, whose band, Simply Saucer, Gold began managing and producing, releasing their first record on 8 June 1978 through Pig Records. It was voted Single of the Week in London's Record Mirror the following month. By then, The Pig Paper was being distributed throughout the U.S. and Europe, offering early in-depth coverage of The Viletones, Ramones, Half Japanese, Elvis Costello and Talking Heads, as well as features on vintage acts such as The Hollies and The Dave Clark Five.

The Pig Paper has become an important primary source for the documentation of the Toronto punk scene, with citations in numerous published works and histories of the punk movement.

Gold is a noted interviewer and music writer, writing for music publications and fanzines like Ear Candy Mag, Indie Journal, and Purrmag.

Gold is a writer and contribute to numerous music publications, authoring the MusicHound Essential Album Guide series (Visible Ink Press), as well as Bubblegum Music Is the Naked Truth; Encounters with Bob Dylan; Lost in the Grooves; Paul McCartney: I Saw Him Standing There; TV A-Go-Go; Treat Me Like Dirt: An Oral History of Punk in Toronto and Beyond, 1977–1981; and The Little Black Book of Music. He is a contributor on publications such as Lost in the Grooves: Scram's Capricious Guide to the Music You Missed, published by Routledge.

His syndicated "Pigshit" column continues to run monthly online, having first appeared in Los Angeles's Flipside fanzine in 1979.

He was also a featured interview subject in the documentary film Jandek on Corwood (2003).

== Career as musician ==
Immediately after attending a Jan and Dean concert in Toronto, during the summer of 1980, Gold relocated to California, where he formed The Loved Ones as well as promoting concerts for local bands such as The Crowd over the next three years. He spent the remainder of the decade back in Canada, first joining the Vancouver-based band Fun With Numbers before touring five years with Endless Summer. In 1989, he returned to the studio, working in Nashville alongside Donald Dunn and Pat Boone, then at Daniel Lanois's Grant Avenue Studio with Dave DesRoches, the latter sessions resulting in the album Valentino's Pirates, which became the first independently-recorded western release to be issued on the Soviet Union-based Melodiya label.

After relocating to New York City with DesRoches to form the Dave Rave Conspiracy alongside Billy Ficca of Television and ex–Washington Squares member Lauren Agnelli, Gold co-founded the pioneering alternative-country band The Ghost Rockets, whose "Maximum Rhythm 'n' Bluegrass" cover of The Beach Boys's "In My Room" became a radio turntable hit in Europe. Another song, "Marcia Marcia Marcia", written by Gold, Buddy Woodward and David Ribyat for the 1996 film A Very Brady Sequel, appeared instead on the King Records label in New Zealand, to be followed by dozens of other Ghost Rockets releases worldwide.

== Career as producer ==
Gold meanwhile produced two albums for Shane Faubert, formerly of The Cheepskates, at Dubway Studios. With Faubert he began the To M’Lou Music label in 1998, releasing the acclaimed debut album of the Los Angeles band The Masticators as well as He's a Rebel: The Gene Pitney Story Retold, which included exclusive recordings by Bill Cowsill, Mick Farren, Gordon Waller and Al Kooper. Gold contributed tracks himself to Bay City Rollers tribute album Men in Plaid (Bullseye Records) as well as singing alongside Jim Carroll for Back to the Streets: Celebrating the Music of Don Covay, and with Andrew Loog Oldham on the 1993 issue of Alex Chilton's Bach's Bottom album.

== Later career ==
In 2008, Gold began work at John Huelbig's Backroom Studios in Wallington, New Jersey, writing, performing and producing with such musicians as Mark Johnson, Chris Butler, Dave Desroches and Frank Lee Sprague.

== Discography ==
=== As leader ===
- Gary Pig Gold, 1998
- "Permanent Vacation" / "Rock and Roll Love Letter," 2000
- Gary Goes to Hollywood!, 2002

=== As member/sideman ===
- "Johnny Kool" / "Wouldn't It Be Nice" – Endless Summer, 1986
- "That Summer Feeling" / "Wouldn't It Be Nice" – Endless Summer, 1988
- "Fools' Hall of Fame" – Pat Boone, 1989
- Kalkara – Shane Faubert, 1990
- Amazing Grace – The Wretches, 1990
- A One Act Play with V-8 Engines – Dave Rave Conspiracy, 1992
- Bach's Bottom – Alex Chilton, 1993
- "Christmas" / "Steeplechase" – The Rooks, 1993
- Cowboy Flowers Sessions – Lauren Agnelli and Dave Rave, 1995
- "Roses to You" / "Marcia Marcia Marcia" – The Ghost Rockets, 1996
- "Weight of the World" / "Do It All Over" – Dave Rave Conspiracy, 1996
- Confetti! – Agnelli and Rave, 1997
- Bootlegs – The Ghost Rockets, 1998
- Spatula Ranch Sessions, Volume One – The Ghost Rockets, 1998
- Encore Echoes – The Rooks, 2000
- D. T. Delinquent – Jack Pedler, 2003
- Lost and Found – Jeremy (Morris), 2004
- Anthology, Vols. 1 & 2 – Dave Rave, 2006
- Modern Silence – Casper & the Cookies, 2009
- NBT-4-CNP – The Next Big Thing, 2009
- Live with What You Know – Dave Rave, 2010
- Complete Masticators! – The Masticators, 2013
- Best – Mick Hargreaves, 2013
- A Little Messed Up in Rock & Roll – Dave Rave, 2017

=== Compilation albums ===
- Baloney Sandwich – The Loved Ones, The Know Goods, 1990
- 1990 Volume 5 – Dave Rave Group, 1991
- 22 Original Hits, 22 Original Stars – Dave Rave Conspiracy, Lauren Agnelli, 1991
- U.S. Rock 'n' Roll Anthology Volume 1 – Dave Rave, 1991
- The 8th Wonder – Martin and the E-Chords, 1991
- More Hits, More Stars – Dave Rave Conspiracy, Coyote Shivers, 1992
- Reaction, Volume One – Dave Rave Conspiracy, 1992
- Rock My Child – Lauren Agnelli, 1993
- Back to the Streets: Celebrating the Music of Don Covay, 1993
- Impact Music, Volume 2 – Dave Rave Conspiracy, 1994
- Powerplay – The Ghost Rockets, 1995
- Total Fun – The Ghost Rockets, 1996
- Hit the Hay, Volume 2 – The Ghost Rockets, 1996
- Never Been to Nashville – The Ghost Rockets, 1996
- Astral Weeks – The Ghost Rockets, 1996
- Pop! Productions 1987–1997 – The Ghost Rockets, 1997
- A Pig Pop Sampler – The Ghost Rockets, Shane Faubert, 1997
- Edges from the Postcard – The Ghost Rockets, 1997
- Fireworks – The Ghost Rockets, 1997
- Twangfest 1997 – The Ghost Rockets, 1997
- The Ghost Rockets, Astral Weeks – The Ghost Rockets, 1997
- Unsound, Volume One: Pop! – Gary and the Portastudio, 1998
- Edges from the Postcard 2 – The Ghost Rockets, 1998
- Essentials – The Ghost Rockets, 1999
- This Note's for You Too! A Tribute to Neil Young – Shane Faubert, 1999
- Postcards from the Other Side – The Ghost Rockets, 1999
- A Tribute to the Left Banke: Shadows Breaking over Our Heads – Shane Faubert, 1999
- Men in Plaid: A Tribute to the Bay City Rollers – Gary and the Grip Weeds, 2000
- Full Circle: A Tribute to Gene Clark – The Ghost Rockets, 2000
- Burnt Marshmallows and Teeny Bikinis – Gary and the Masticators, 2000
- International Pop Overthrow Vol. 3 – Shane Faubert, 2000
- Shoe Fetish: A Tribute to Shoes – Shane Faubert, 2001
- Dropped on the Head, Volume 1 – Gary Pig Gold, 2001
- Uno-A-Go-Go! – Gary Pig Gold, 2002
- Under the Covers at Hawthorne High Vol. 9 – The Ghost Rockets, 2004
- This Is Rock 'n' Roll Radio, Volume 1 – Gary Pig Gold and Shane Faubert, 2005
- The Blog Gems, Volume Three (1976–1999) – Gary and the Masticators, 2006
- Hi-Fi Christmas Party Volume 2 – Gary Pig Gold, 2006
- Sweet Relief – The Next Big Thing, Ghost Rockets, Dave Rave Group, 2007
- ValleyView Christmas Compilation 2007 – Gary Pig Gold, 2007
- Tributes or Not Tributes – Gary and the Grip Weeds, 2008
- Raiders of the Lost Hook Vol. 2 – Dave Rave Group, 2008
- The Mockeers: Then and Now – Gary Pig Gold and his Loved Ones, 2008
- ValleyView Christmas Compilation 2008 – Gary Gold and his Orchestra, 2008
- That's Truckdrivin' – Gary Pig Gold, 2009
- Winter Holidays with Little Pocket – Gary Pig Gold, 2009
- Not Quite Yet (Wives Alive @5) – The Faubert Gold, 2010
- International Email Audio Art Project Volume 2 – Gary Pig Gold, 2010
- Mongrel Zine Volume Nine CD Comp – Gary Pig Gold, 2010
- What We Do on Our Holidays – Gary Pig Gold, 2010
- Best of Mongrel Zine #1–3 Compilation – Gary Pig Gold, 2011
- Pop Garden Radio Presents: The Rock on the Road Tour, Season 2 – The Next Big Thing, 2011
- Legacy: A Tribute to Rick Nelson, Volume 1 – Gary Pig Gold, 2013
- Get Yer Fa La La's Out: A Bullseye Christmas Vol. III – Gary Pig Gold, 2013
- It Was 50 Years Ago Today: A Tribute to the Beatles, Volume 2 – Little Sisters, 2014
- Heavy Metalloid Music – The Loved Ones, 2016

=== Production credits ===
- "She's a Dog" / "I Can Change My Mind" – Simply Saucer, 1978, 2018
- Valentino's Pirates – Dave Rave Conspiracy (a.k.a. Dave Rave Group), 1990, 2001, 2019
- San Blass – Shane Faubert, 1993
- Three Octave Fantastic Hexagram – Dave Rave Conspiracy, 1994
- Squirrelboy Blue – Shane Faubert, 1997
- Unsound, Volume Two: Guitars! – various artists, 1999
- Homework # 2: U.S. D.I.Y. – Punk and Punkwave Singles R to U – Simply Saucer, 2000
- Driving in the Rain 3AM: Songs to Get Lost With – Dave Rave Group, 2002
- He's a Rebel: The Gene Pitney Story Retold – various artists, 2002
- Cyborgs Revisited – Simply Saucer, 2003
- "Pumpkin" – Richard Cross, 2026

=== Liner Notes credits ===
- More Hits, More Stars – Rick Harper, Mark William Johnson, 1992
- Astral Weeks – The Ghost Rockets, 1996
- Unsound, Volume One: Pop!, 1998
- Unsound, Volume Two: Guitars!, 1999
- Burnt Marshmallows and Teeny Bikinis, 2000
- 232 Days on the Road – Adam Marsland, 2002
- Cyborgs Revisited – Simply Saucer, 2003
- Mad Kingdom – Robin Stanley, 2004
- Magic City Music: Ft. Lauderdale 1981–1986 – Breathers, 2004
- Lost And Found – Jeremy (Morris), 2004
- Remember – The Cheepskates, 2004
- Jam on Jeremy: A Tribute to Jeremy Morris, 2005
- Down in a Mirror: A Second Tribute to Jandek, 2005
- 7th Floor Christmas – Erich Overhultz, 2005
- The New Sell Out, 2012
- Saucerland – Simply Saucer, 2016
- Valentino's Pirates – Dave Rave Conspiracy (a.k.a Dave Rave Group), 2019

== Bibliography ==
- Music Hound Rock: The Essential Album Guide (Visible Ink / Omnibus, 1996, 1999, contributor)
- Music Hound Country: The Essential Album Guide (Visible Ink / Omnibus, 1997, contributor)
- Music Hound R&B: The Essential Album Guide (Visible Ink / Omnibus, 1998, contributor)
- Music Hound Folk: The Essential Album Guide (Visible Ink / Omnibus, 1998, contributor)
- Music Hound Lounge: The Essential Album Guide to Martini Music and Easy Listening (Visible Ink / Omnibus, 1998, contributor)
- On a Cold Road: Tales of Adventure in Canadian Rock by Dave Bidini (McClelland & Stewart, 1998, interview subject)
- Music Hound Swing: The Essential Album Guide (Visible Ink / Omnibus, 1999, contributor)
- Music Hound World: The Essential Album Guide (Visible Ink / Omnibus, 2000, contributor)
- Encounters with Bob Dylan: If You See Him, Say Hello (Humble Press, 2000, contributor)
- Paul McCartney: I Saw Him Standing There (Billboard Books, 2000, contributor)
- Bubblegum Music is the Naked Truth: The Dark History of Prepubescent Pop, from the Banana Splits to Britney Spears (Feral House, 2001, contributor)
- The Beach Boys' Pet Sounds: The Greatest Album of the Twentieth Century (Helter Skelter, 2001, contributor)
- Lost In The Grooves (Routledge, 2005, contributor)
- T.V. A-Go-Go: Rock on T.V. from American Bandstand to American Idol (Chicago Review Press, 2005, contributor)
- The Little Black Book of Music (Cassell Illustrated, 2007, contributor)
- The Top 100 Canadian Albums (Goose Lane Editions, 2007, contributor)
- Treat Me Like Dirt: An Oral History of Punk in Toronto and Beyond, 1977–1981 (Bongo Beat Books / ECW Press, 2009, 2011, editor, interview subject)
- The Mammoth Book of Bob Dylan (Constable & Robinson / Running Press, 2011, contributor)
- Perfect Youth: The Birth of Canadian Punk (ECW Press, 2012, interview subject)
- The Canadian Pop Music Encyclopedia Volumes 1 and 2 (Bullseye Canada, 2012, contributor)
- A Lennon Pastiche: Expressions from Fans of John Lennon (PANGEA Publishing, 2013, contributor)
- 50 Licks: Myths and Stories from Half a Century of the Rolling Stones (Bloomsbury Publishing, 2013, contributor)
- A Tribute to the Forgotten Rebels (ePub Bud, 2013, contributor)
- The Mammoth Book of the Rolling Stones (Constable & Robinson / Running Press, 2013, contributor)
- It Was Fifty Years Ago Today: The Beatles Invade America and Hollywood (Otherworld Cottage Industries, 2014, interview subject)
- Turn Up the Radio! Rock, Pop, and Roll in Los Angeles 1956–1972 (Santa Monica Press, 2014, contributor)
- Gods of the Hammer: The Teenage Head Story (Coach House Books, 2014, interview subject)
- Neil Young: Heart of Gold (Backbeat Books, 2015, contributor)
- Heavy Metalloid Music: The Story of Simply Saucer (Eternal Cavalier Press, 2016, interview subject)
- 1967: A Complete Rock Music History of the Summer of Love (Sterling Publishing, 2017, contributor)
- Inside Cave Hollywood: Music InnerViews and InterViews Collection, Vol. 1 (Cave Hollywood, 2017, contributor)
- Dreamer: The Making of Dennis Wilson's "Pacific Ocean Blue" (Jetfighter, 2017, interview subject)
- The Doors: Summer's Gone (Otherworld Cottage Industries, 2018, contributor)
- The Story of the Band: From Big Pink to the Last Waltz (Sterling Publishing, 2018, contributor)
- Docs that Rock, Music that Matters (Otherworld Cottage Industries, 2020, contributor)
- The Magic's in the Music: A Celebration of the Lovin' Spoonful, Volume 2 (CreateSpace, 2020, contributor)
- Domenic Troiano: His Life and Music (FriesenPress, 2021, interview subject)
- Jimi Hendrix: Voodoo Child (Sterling Publishing, 2021, interview subject)
- Runaway: The Del Shannon Story (Xlibris, 2023, interview subject)
- SMiLE: The Rise, Fall, and Resurrection of Brian Wilson (Omnibus Press, 2025, contributor)
- The Beatles in Canada: The Evolution 1964–1970 (Hemmingsen Publishing, 2025, contributor)
- Screen Gems: Pop Music Documentaries & Rock and Roll TV Scenes (BearManor Media, 2025, contributor)

=== Selected articles ===
- The Blacklisted Journalist
- In Music We Trust
- New York Waste
- Medleyville
- Go Metric
- The Rock and Roll Report
- PopDiggers

== Filmography ==
- Jandek on Corwood, 2004
- The Last Pogo Jumps Again, 2013
- Records, 2021
