= Shadow of Leaves =

Studio album by Jandek
- Released: 2004
- Recorded: Unknown
- Genre: Outsider music
- Length: 40:21
- Label: Corwood Industries
- Producer: Corwood Industries

Jandek chronology
The Gone Wait (2003)	Shadow of Leaves (2004)	The End of It All (2004)

Professional ratings
Review scores
Source	Rating
Allmusic	3/5 stars

Shadow of Leaves is the 36th release by avant- folk/blues singer-songwriter Jandek, released by his own Corwood Industries label (#0774). It is his first release of four released in 2004, and the second album to feature his voice accompanied by solo fretless electric bass, though the lyrics are darker and more personal than the last album.

== Track listing ==
No.	Title	Length
1.	"Shadow of Leaves"	29:02
2.	"Find Me Again"	6:15
3.	"I Give You Me"	5:04
Total length:		40:21
