= A Kingdom He Likes =

Studio album by Jandek
- Released: 2004
- Recorded: Unknown
- Genre: Outsider music
- Length: 36:15
- Label: Corwood Industries
- Producer: Corwood Industries

Jandek chronology
The Door Behind (2004)	A Kingdom He Likes (2004)	When I Took That Train (2005)

Professional ratings
Review scores
Source	Rating
The Village Voice	(not rated)
Allmusic	2.5/5 stars

A Kingdom He Likes is the 39th release by avant-folk/blues singer/songwriter Jandek, released by his own Corwood Industries label (#0777). It was his fourth release of 2004 and features the artist on acoustic guitar.

== Track listing ==
No.	Title	Length
1.	"I Gave My Eternity"	10:58
2.	"Real Afternoons"	5:32
3.	"A Windy Time"	3:10
4.	"Your Own Little World"	4:35
5.	"Sticks In The Marsh"	4:32
6.	"No One Knows Your Name"	3:38
7.	"It Rang Eleven Times"	3:50
Total length:		36:15
