= Interstellar Discussion =

Studio album by Jandek
- Released: 1984
- Genre: Rock, outsider
- Length: 40:43
- Label: Corwood Industries
- Producer: Corwood Industries

Jandek chronology
The Rocks Crumble (1983)	Interstellar Discussion (1984)	Nine-Thirty (1985)

Professional ratings
Review scores
Source	Rating
AllMusic	link
Op Magazine issue Y	favorable link
Vinyl Absolution	favorable link

Interstellar Discussion is the ninth album by Jandek, and his only release of 1984. It was released as Corwood 0747. It was reissued on CD in 2001.

== Track listing ==
No.	Title	Length
1.	"Starless"	2:15
2.	"Hey"	2:28
3.	"Why Did I Change a Word in the Last Song"	2:50
4.	"Waltz in Two-Fourths Time"	2:41
5.	"Call You the Sun"	2:53
6.	"I Ain't Got None"	2:55
7.	"The Spirit"	2:22
8.	"Rifle in the Closet"	4:20
9.	"Sung"	1:27
10.	"Ha Ha"	2:16
11.	"Customary"	2:38
12.	"May 7, 9:15AM"	2:42
13.	"Situations"	2:21
14.	"Couldn't Be a Reader"	2:12
15.	"Kick"	3:34
Total length:		40:43

== Album cover description ==
Objects on the cover were also used on previous album covers. The drum set is from The Rocks Crumble, minus the snare. The writing desk is from Your Turn to Fall. The drum throne is a naugahyde chair.
