= You Walk Alone =

Studio album by Jandek
- Released: 1988
- Recorded: unknown
- Genres: Blues rock, outsider
- Length: 42:48
- Label: Corwood Industries
- Producer: Corwood Industries

Jandek chronology
Blue Corpse (1987)	You Walk Alone (1988)	On the Way (1988)

Professional ratings
Review scores
Source	Rating
Forced Exposure	(very favorable)

You Walk Alone is the sixteenth album by Jandek, and the first of two released in 1988. It is Corwood Industries (#0754), and is the first album by the "blues rock" band that followed the apparent meltdown of the original "garage rock" band.

== Track listing ==
No.	Title	Length
1.	"Lavender"	3:49
2.	"Time and Space"	7:28
3.	"The Cat That Walked From Shelbyville"	6:23
4.	"Quinn Boys II"	3:56
5.	"The Way That You Act"	4:26
6.	"I Know The Times"	3:17
7.	"When The Telephone Melts"	9:06
8.	"War Dance"	3:58
Total length:		42:48
