= Six and Six =

Studio album by Jandek
- Released: 1981
- Genre: Folk, blues, outsider
- Length: 44:26
- Label: Corwood Industries
- Producer: Jandek

Jandek chronology
Ready for the House (1978)	Six and Six (1981)	Later On (1981)

Professional ratings
Review scores
Source	Rating
AllMusic	link
Op Magazine, issue M	favorable
Forced Exposure	not rated link

Six and Six is the second studio album by American musician Jandek, and the first to be released under the Jandek name (the debut, Ready for the House, was credited to "The Units" on first pressing). It was released in 1981, by Corwood Industries (#0740). There have been two CD reissues so far, each adding more silence between the tracks.

This album appeared three years after Ready for the House, which remains the longest interval between Jandek albums so far. It is composed mainly of slow songs, most of which deal with topics like regret and hopelessness. The music is stark and slow, with a flattened-out dissonant blues sound.

FACT named it the 61st greatest album of the 80s.

== Track listing ==
No.	Title	Length
1.	"Feathered Drums"	3:34
2.	"Point Judith"	4:16
3.	"I Knew You Would Leave"	10:14
4.	"Can I See Your Clock"	3:00
5.	"Wild Strawberries"	6:02
6.	"Forgive Me"	4:05
7.	"Hilltop Serenade"	5:31
8.	"You're the Best One"	3:06
9.	"Delinquent Words"	3:58
Total length:		44:26
