= The Ruins of Adventure =

Studio album by Jandek
- Released: December 2006
- Genre: Folk music, outsider music
- Length: 46:38
- Label: Corwood Industries
- Producer: Jandek

Jandek chronology
| Austin Sunday (2006) | The Ruins of Adventure (2006) | Manhattan Tuesday (2007) |

Professional ratings
Review scores
| Source | Rating |
|---|---|
| PopMatters | 7/10 stars |
| Tiny Mix Tapes | 4/5 stars |
| Brainwashed | Positive |

The Ruins of Adventure is the 49th album by avant-folk/blues singer/songwriter Jandek, the 45th 'studio' album released by Corwood Industries around December 2006 (#0787). The photograph used for the album's front cover appears to be the same one used for Jandek's previous release What Else Does The Time Mean?, only instead cropped to the man's face.

== Track listing ==
| No. | Title | Length |
|---|---|---|
| 1. | "The Park" | 10:08 |
| 2. | "Bluff Brink" | 8:10 |
| 3. | "Completely Yours" | 7:10 |
| 4. | "Mysteries of Existence" | 6:42 |
| 5. | "The Ruins of Adventure" | 14:28 |
| Total length: | | 46:38 |
