= Frantic City =

Studio album by Teenage Head
- Released: 1980
- Genres: Punk rock; new wave
- Length: 35:38
- Label: Attic
- Producer: Stacy Heydon

Teenage Head chronology
Teenage Head (1979)	Frantic City (1980)	Some Kinda Fun (1982)

Singles from Frantic City
- 1. "Somethin' on My Mind"; 2. "Let's Shake"

Frantic City is the second studio album by Teenage Head. It was released in 1980. The album was certified Platinum in Canada in 1983.

== Track listing ==
All tracks are written by Gordon Lewis, Steve Mahon, Nick Stipanitz, Frankie "Venom" Kerr unless otherwise indicated.

No.	Title	Writer(s)	Length
1.	"Wild One"	Tilman Franks, Merle Kilmore	2:12
2.	"Somethin' on My Mind"		3:38
3.	"Total Love"		4:44
4.	"Let's Shake"		3:02
5.	"Infected"		5:30
6.	"Those Things You Do"		3:07
7.	"Somethin' Else"	Eddie Cochran, Sharon Sheeley, Bob Cochran	2:43
8.	"Take It"		3:56
9.	"Brand New Cadillac"	Vince Taylor	2:42
10.	"Disgusteen"		4:12
Total length:			35:38

Bonus tracks on 2005 CD re-release
No.	Title	Writer(s)	Length
11.	"Let's Shake" (New version)		2:50
12.	"I Wanna Love You" (Live)	Bobby Jameson	2:21

== Personnel ==
Teenage Head

- Frankie Venom (Kerr) - vocals
- Gordon Lewis - guitar
- Steve Mahon - bass
- Nick Stipanitz - drums, vocals, backing vocals

Additional musicians

- Ricky Morrison - saxophone
- Grant Slater - piano

Production

- Stacy Heydon - producer
- Greg Roberts - engineer
- Dean Motter - design

== Chart positions ==
=== Singles ===
Year	Song	RPM Chart Position
1980	"Somethin' on My Mind"	28
1980	"Let's Shake"	86
