= Modern Dances =

Studio album by Jandek
- Released: 1987
- Genre: Rock, outsider
- Length: 43:29
- Label: Corwood Industries
- Producer: Corwood Industries

Jandek chronology
Follow Your Footsteps (1986)	Modern Dances (1987)	Blue Corpse (1987)

Professional ratings
Review scores
Source	Rating
Forced Exposure #12	(favorable) link
Away From The Pulsebeat, 1988	(favorable) link
CMJ #125	(favorable) link

Modern Dances is the fourteenth album by Jandek, released as Corwood #0752. It is the first of two releases from 1987, and marks the end of the original "garage" band (which would have a different incarnation starting a few albums later).

== Track listing ==
No.	Title	Length
1.	"Painted My Teeth"	4:45
2.	"Twelve Minutes Since February 32"	4:05
3.	"Hand for Harry Idle"	3:44
4.	"Number 512"	3:33
5.	"Nothing Is Better Than God"	4:21
6.	"Spiritual Song"	3:58
7.	"Spanish In Me 003"	4:22
8.	"I Want To Know Why"	4:59
9.	"Simple As That"	2:07
10.	"Open E"	3:16
11.	"Carnival Queen"	3:36
Total length:		43:29
