= I Am the Future =

- Italian single cover

Single by Alice Cooper

from the album Zipper Catches Skin
- B-side: "Zorro's Ascent" (Europe & UK) "Tag, You're It" (US)
- Released: October 1982 (Europe); November 1982 (US); March 1983 (UK)
- Genre: New wave; pop rock
- Length: 3:29 - Album Version; 3:45 - Remix Version
- Label: Warner Bros.
- Songwriter(s): Lalo Schifrin; Gary Osborne
- Producer(s): Steve Tyrell

Alice Cooper singles chronology
"I Like Girls" (1982)	"I Am the Future" (1982)	"I Love America" (1983)

"I Am the Future" is a 1982 song by American rock musician Alice Cooper recorded for the 1982 film Class of 1984. The song was one of two singles released from his seventh solo studio album Zipper Catches Skin (1982). The single did not chart, and despite the advent of MTV at the time a promotional video was not created for it.

The song was produced by Steve Tyrell and written by Lalo Schifrin and Gary Osborne.

The 1982 US single featured the remix version of "I Am the Future" and had "Tag, You're It" as its B-side. The international single releases had "Zorro's Ascent" as its B-side and featured the album version of "I Am the Future" with exception to the UK single, released in March 1983, which featured the remix version of the song. Like "I Am the Future", both B-sides are also featured on the Zipper Catches Skin album. The remix version of "I Am the Future" was eventually included in 1999's The Life and Crimes of Alice Cooper box set.

== Releases on albums ==
- Zipper Catches Skin (1982) — album version
- The Life and Crimes of Alice Cooper (1999) — remix version
