= Foreign Keys =

Studio album by Jandek
- Released: 1985
- Genre: Folk, experimental, outsider
- Length: 43:47
- Label: Corwood Industries
- Producer: Corwood Industries

Jandek chronology
Nine-Thirty (1985)	Foreign Keys (1985)	Telegraph Melts (1986)

Foreign Keys is the second album released in 1985 by musician Jandek, and his eleventh overall. This is the first Jandek album featuring a full band, and is without acoustic numbers. It is also an album split between tracks sung by Jandek and tracks sung by a female counterpart.

Professional ratings
Review scores
Source	Rating
AllMusic	link
Forced Exposure	(very favorable) link

== Track listing ==
No.	Title	Length
1.	"Spanish in Me"	5:42
2.	"Lost Cause"	4:27
3.	"Caper"	5:44
4.	"Uncle Steve"	2:28
5.	"Don't Be So Mean"	2:07
6.	"Coming Quiet"	1:54
7.	"Needs No Sun"	3:12
8.	"Oh No"	2:20
9.	"Some of Your Peace"	2:41
10.	"Put it Away"	4:27
11.	"Ballad of Robert"	3:45
12.	"River to Madrid"	4:21
Total length:		43:47
