= When I Took That Train =

Studio album by Jandek
- Released: 2005
- Recorded: Unknown
- Length: 42:40
- Label: Corwood Industries
- Producer: Jandek

Jandek chronology
A Kingdom He Likes (2004)	When I Took That Train (2005)	Glasgow Sunday (2005)

Professional ratings
Review scores
Source	Rating
Allmusic	2.5/5 stars

When I Took That Train is the 40th release by avant-folk/blues singer/songwriter Jandek, and the first of four released in 2005 by his own Corwood Industries label, as #0778.

The cover photo depicts the Corwood Representative standing on a street in central London – behind him can be seen Mansion House and, further back, the entrance to Bank Underground station.

== Track listing ==
No.	Title	Length
1.	"I Talked To You Today"	4:07
2.	"When I See You Again"	2:52
3.	"The Image Of You"	3:27
4.	"Close To You"	3:22
5.	"You Took Me For A Ride"	4:13
6.	"What Else Is There"	2:16
7.	"Wouldn't You Agree"	3:22
8.	"You Made Me Know It"	2:45
9.	"Angel Moves"	3:43
10.	"Thing Called Me"	5:43
11.	"My Escape"	6:50
Total length:		42:40
