= Living in a Moon So Blue =

Studio album by Jandek
- Released: 1982
- Genres: Folk, blues, outsider
- Length: 43:15
- Label: Corwood Industries
- Producer: Corwood Industries

Jandek chronology
Chair Beside a Window (1982)	Living in a Moon So Blue (1982)	Staring at the Cellophane (1982)

Professional ratings
Review scores
Source	Rating
AllMusic	3/5 stars
OP Magazine, Issue S	(unfavorable)
OP Magazine, Issue T	(favorable)
Forced Exposure	(favorable)

Living in a Moon so Blue is the fifth Jandek album, and was issued as Corwood 0743 in 1982. It was reissued on CD in 2001.

== Track listing ==
No.	Title	Length
1.	"Gretchen"	2:48
2.	"One Step Ahead"	2:12
3.	"Suppression"	2:10
4.	"Strange Phenomenon"	3:11
5.	"You Can Stop Now"	2:20
6.	"Comedy"	1:52
7.	"Sailors"	1:46
8.	"Bludgeon"	1:47
9.	"All in an Apple Orchard"	2:32
10.	"She Fell Down"	3:26
11.	"Professional"	2:26
12.	"Anticipation"	2:35
13.	"Alexandria Knows"	2:32
14.	"Quite Nonchalant"	2:15
15.	"Relief of the Night"	3:19
16.	"Crime Pays"	2:56
Total length:		43:15
