= The Song of Morgan =

Studio album by Jandek
- Released: 2013
- Genre: Outsider
- Length: 8:36:09
- Label: Corwood Industries
- Producer: Corwood Industries

Jandek chronology
Richmond Sunday (2013)	The Song of Morgan (2013)	Athens Saturday (2013)

The Song of Morgan is an album by avant-musician and singer/songwriter Jandek released, as with all Jandek albums, on Corwood Industries. The album is a box set, containing 9 CDs. Each disc contains a single piece for solo piano. There are no vocals on any of the pieces. The album sleeve depicts Jandek as a child and was the youngest photograph of "The Representative From Corwood Industries" that had been used as artwork for a Jandek album until Mankato Saturday (2025).

The pieces are all entitled "Nocturne" and numbered one to nine, shortest piece being "Nocturne Seven" at 51 minutes and the longest "Nocturne Three" at just over an hour.

== Track listing ==
Disc 1
No.	Title	Length
1.	"Nocturne One"	55:22

Disc 2
No.	Title	Length
1.	"Nocturne Two"	58:39

Disc 3
No.	Title	Length
1.	"Nocturne Three"	60:42

Disc 4
No.	Title	Length
1.	"Nocturne Four"	60:33

Disc 5
No.	Title	Length
1.	"Nocturne Five"	58:20

Disc 6
No.	Title	Length
1.	"Nocturne Six"	58:54

Disc 7
No.	Title	Length
1.	"Nocturne Seven"	51:31

Disc 8
No.	Title	Length
1.	"Nocturne Eight"	59:16

Disc 9
No.	Title	Length
1.	"Nocturne Nine"	52:52
