= Tornado EP =

Tornado

EP by Teenage Heads
- Released: 1983
- Studios: Metalworks, Mississauga, Ontario
- Genre: Punk rock
- Length: 17:51
- Label: MCA
- Producer: David Bendeth

Teenage Heads chronology
Some Kinda Fun (1982)	Tornado (1983)	Endless Party (1984)

Tornado is an EP by Canadian punk rock band Teenage Heads, released in 1983. It was the band's first release on MCA and their first international release outside of Canada. Normally called Teenage Head, MCA convinced the band to change their name on this release to a pluralized form to avoid possible censorship and also encouraged a more polished, mainstream sound

== Track listing ==
All tracks are written by Gordon Lewis, Steve Marshall, Nick Stipanitz, Frankie "Venom" Kerr unless otherwise indicated.

No.	Title	Length
1.	"Don't Cage Me In"	2:52
2.	"(I'm Just) Too True"	3:01
3.	"Dangerous Imagination"	3:21
4.	"Tornado"	2:50
5.	"Blood Boogie"	2:14
6.	"Luv For Sale"	3:33
Total length:		17:51

== Personnel ==
- Frankie Venom (Kerr) - vocals
- Gordon Lewis - electric guitar
- Steve Marshall - bass
- Nick Stipanitz - drums, vocals
- David Bendeth - producer
- Ed Stone - engineer
- Recorded at Metalworks, Mississauga, Ontario, Canada

== Charts ==
=== Album ===
Year	Chart	Position
1983	RPM	30

=== Singles ===
Year	Song	RPM Chart Position
1983	"Tornado"	39
