= The Metal West =

Studio album by Kid Icarus
- Released: 2005
- Genre: Indie rock
- Length: 41:36
- Label: Summersteps Records
- Producer: Dan McKinney at Dan's House Studio, except Tracks 2 and 10, Barry P. Saranchuk at Black Plastic Sound

Kid Icarus chronology
Be My Echo (2002)	The Metal West (2005)	Imaginary Songs & Aluminum Hits (2010)

Professional ratings
Review scores
Source	Rating
CD Baby	(very favourable)
Left of the Dial	(favourable)

The Metal West is the third studio album by Kid Icarus. Released in 2005 by Summerstep Records, the album was the first by Kid Icarus to feature a full band, with the line-up consisting of guitarist Justin Marchegiani, bassist Ted Baird, keyboardist Chuck Keller, and drummer Thad Moyer. The album cover was painted by Cassie Rose Kobeski.

== Reception ==
PopMatters music critic Mike Schiller praised album track "A Retail Hell", calling it "a nice two-guitar acoustic tune about the mundane routine of everyday life that would sound a bit like Bright Eyes if Conor Oberst sang more than he emoted." Schiller gave the album a generally unfavorable review, however, saying that "[a]side from a few tight, solid tunes, the rest of the album veers toward those attempts to expand the basic rock sound, and as such, The Metal West is a frustrating listen." Spin magazine writer Lane Brown described the album as having "a mellow, spacey vibe that would collapse under the weight of a slicker treatment." Brown added that while The Metal West contains immediate highlights, such as the title track and "Beekeepers on the Edge of Town", the album benefits from repeated listening.

== Track listing ==
All songs written by Eric Schlittler.

1. "Beekeepers On The Edge Of Town" - 2:53
2. "A Retail Hell" - 1:54
3. "My Anthracite Headache" - 3:46
4. "Marlowe's Blues" - 2:18
5. "The Metal West" - 7:06
6. "The Murderess" - 4:42
7. "700 Angry Ghosts" - 3:44
8. "White Church Rd" - 3:35
9. "Perils of Dating in 1899" - 1:54
10. "Field Song and Record" - 4:11
11. "Her Song for Beth and the Sideshow" - 5:41

== Notes ==
- "The Murderess" was a featured Music Interlude on NPR's Talk of the Nation on May 31, 2005.
