= This Narrow Road =

Studio album by Jandek
- Released: 2001
- Recorded: Unknown
- Genres: A cappella, spoken word, outsider music
- Length: 53:52
- Label: Corwood Industries
- Producer: Corwood Industries

Jandek chronology
Put My Dream on This Planet (2000)	This Narrow Road (2001)	Worthless Recluse (2001)

Professional ratings
Review scores
Source	Rating
AllMusic	2.5/5 stars

This Narrow Road is the 30th album by Jandek, and the first of two new discs (there were several reissues) released in 2001. It is also the second of three (so far) spoken word releases and is Corwood #0768.

== Track listing ==
No.	Title	Length
1.	"One Last Chance"	29:21
2.	"Killer Cats in the Caribbean"	3:05
3.	"Yes You Are"	2:44
4.	"The Name I Had"	3:30
5.	"I Need To Be"	2:03
6.	"Pieces of Place"	3:29
7.	"Never Never Never"	1:05
8.	"Just Like the Floor"	2:20
9.	"Ten O'Clock Shadows"	2:48
10.	"Come Over Here"	1:06
11.	"Frosted Field"	1:02
12.	"I Knew About Them"	1:17
Total length:		53:52
