= The Beginning (Jandek album) =

Studio album by Jandek
- Released: 1999
- Genre: Outsider music, folk, blues, classical
- Length: 43:23
- Label: Corwood Industries

Jandek chronology
New Town (1998)	The Beginning (1999)	Put My Dream on This Planet (2000)

The Beginning is the 28th album by Jandek. It was released in 1999, and was given Corwood Industries release number 0766. It is considered the final album of Jandek's "second acoustic phase".

== Track listing ==
No.	Title	Length
1.	"It's February"	2:04
2.	"You Standing There"	3:05
3.	"I Never Left You Anyway"	4:00
4.	"Moving Slow"	3:58
5.	"Falling Down Deep"	4:32
6.	"Lonesome Bridge"	4:00
7.	"A Dozen Drops"	6:17
8.	"The Beginning"	15:27
Total length:		43:23

== Reviews ==
Professional ratings
Review scores
Source	Rating
AllMusic	link
