= Ross Beach =

American record producer, musician and songwriter

Ross Beach (born 1973, New Orleans, LA) is a musician, songwriter and record producer living in Portland, Oregon. While attending college in Ruston, Louisiana in the early to mid-1990s, he was a frequent collaborator with a group of musicians who later became known as The Elephant 6 Recording Company, a collective which began an independent record label.

2004-2009: He was president of the board, festival logistics coordinator, and co-founder of the non-profit, Portland-only music festival PDX Pop Now!.

2016–present: He is an on-air personality/DJ on KXRY (aka "XRAYFM") radio in Portland, Oregon, hosting the music program "Alive With Pleasure", named after a song by Portland band Viva Voce (band), who had named their song after a Newport (cigarette) advertising campaign.

== Discography ==
- Ross Beach: Like Crazy Baby (2023, self-released, digital only, 30 min)
- Ross Beach: We Are Getting Gone (2022, self-released, digital only, 16 min)
- Ross Beach: Quar and Peace (2020, self-released, digital only, 34 min)
- Ross Beach: A Confusing Place Of Joy (2018, A Bouncing Space Recordings, digital only, 48 min)
- Ross Beach: Ascension Parish (2014, A Bouncing Space Recordings, digital only, 51 min)
- Ross Beach: Orange Gerbera Daisies (2011, A Bouncing Space Recordings, ABS013 CD, 45 min)
- Ross Island Bridge: Vol 1. The Process Is Now The Work (2009, A Bouncing Space Recordings, ABS012 CD, 37 min)
- Ross Beach: So It's Come To This (2007, Love Harder Presents..., CD-R, 20 min)
- Ross and the Hellpets: Optimism (2006, A Bouncing Space Recordings, ABS011 CD, 40 mins)
- Ross Beach: Country (2005, A Bouncing Space Recordings, ABS010 CD, 43 min)
- Ross Beach: You Make It Look So Easy (2002, A Bouncing Space Records, CD, 40 min)
- Ross and the Hellpets: Teddy Bears Gone Bad (2001, Hotstream/Chicken Ranch, CD-R, 25 min)
- Ross Beach: Ride Theory (1999, Chicken Ranch Records, CD, 60 min)
- Ross Beach: Tender Severity (1997, Chicken Ranch Records, cassette, 60 min)
- Ross Beach: Utopian Love Songs (1996, limited release, cassette, 60 min)
- Ross Beach: They Call Me "Buck" (1996, limited release, cassette EP, 18 min)
- Ross Beach: Cheesequake (1995, limited release, cassette, 60 min)
- Ross Beach: The Hand-Crafted Heart Sickness Calliope (1994, limited release, cassette, 90 min)

As well, several recordings appear on compilations with other artists.

== Filmography ==
- "The Elephant Six Recording Co." (2023) as Himself. Dir: C.B. Stockfleth
