= Dave Desroches =

Canadian rock musician (born c. 1960)

Dave DesRoches
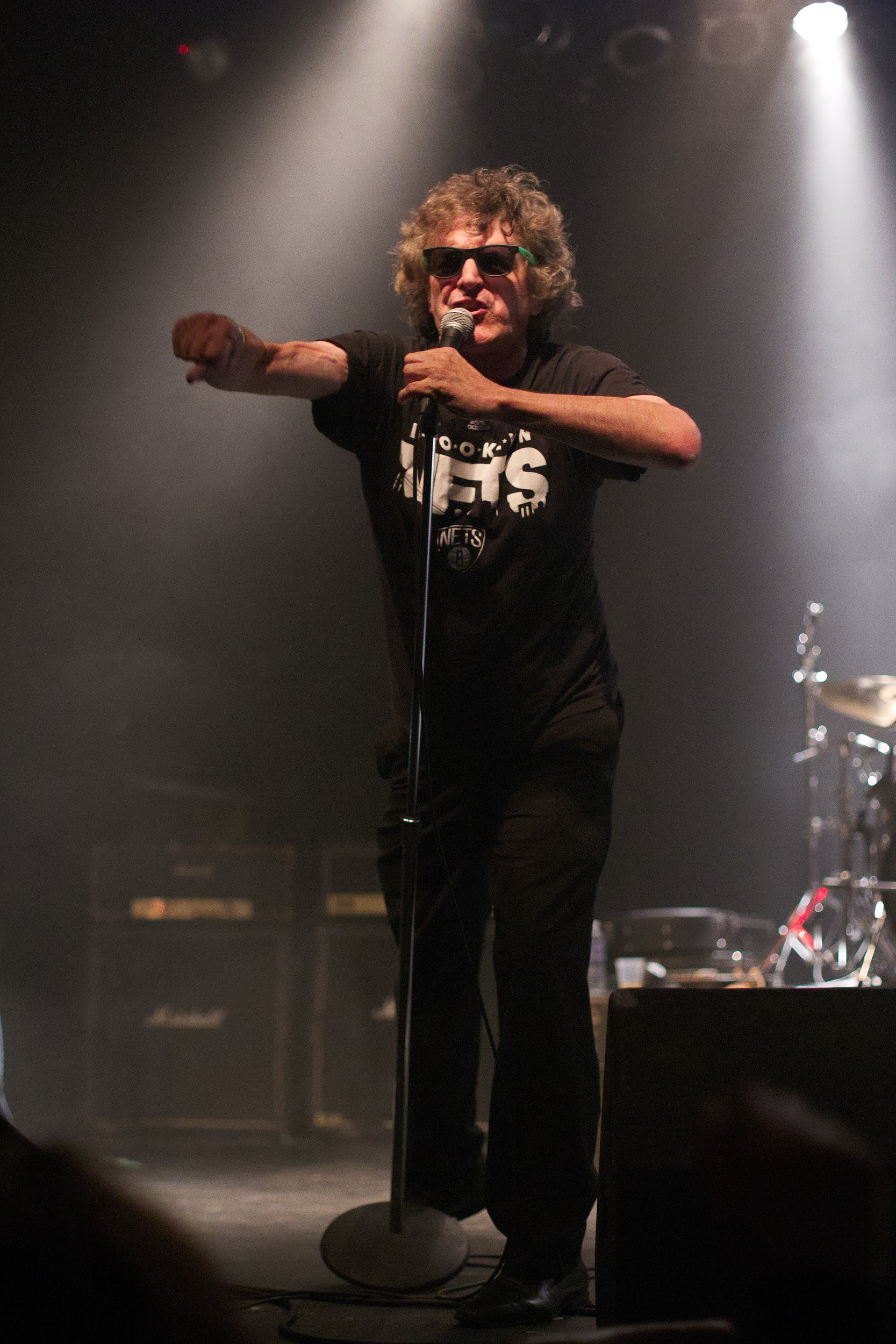
- DesRoches performing with The Gord Lewis Band. Phoenix Concert Theatre, Toronto, 11 September 2015.

Background information
- Also known as: Dave Rave
- Origin: Hamilton, Ontario, Canada
- Genre: Rock
- Member of: Teenage Head

Dave "Rave" DesRoches is a Canadian rock musician from Hamilton, Ontario.

He is the Teenage Head rhythm guitarist on the early recordings who graduated to lead singer during a Frankie Venom hiatus in 1985 and catapulted the band back into the charts. He is a session player who has played with such notables as Daniel Lanois, Andrew Loog Oldham, and Alex Chilton.

== Career ==
=== Early career ===
Dave began his music career in his high school years writing songs and performing driving acoustic rock and folk-pop in and around Hamilton. This evolved into the group, The Shakers, from 1979 to 1982 with Rick Andrew, Tim Gibbons, and Claude DesRoches. They charted many singles with albums produced by Daniel Lanois (U2) and Jack Richardson (Guess Who, Alice Cooper).

=== Teenage Head ===
Three years after the break-up of The Shakers in 1982, Dave took over as lead singer of the punk rock band Teenage Head. He had grown up with the members of the band and had played as a backing musician on their Frantic City LP, and "The Shakers" had often opened for their fellow Hamiltonians. Dave replaced Frankie Venom who had worked with Dave on several other projects. He continued to aid Teenage Head with hits like "Can't Stop Shakin'". Dave left Teenage Head after a successful run to try things out on his own. In November 2016, Teenage Head announced the return of Dave "Rave" Desroches as lead singer.

=== The Dave Rave Conspiracy ===
Alongside producer Gary Pig Gold he formed a group called "The Dave Rave Conspiracy", releasing the album Valentino's Pirates on Russia's Melodiya record label in 1992. However, to appease cold war era Russian sensibilities, the album was credited to the Dave Rave "Group", as the label was uncomfortable with the word "conspiracy". Notably, the band also included Billy Ficca, formerly of the influential New York City band Television, and Lauren Agnelli, of the 1980s anti-folk band Washington Squares. Valentino's Pirates has become a quite a cult classic, and was the first North American rock album released by a post-Soviet state after the fall of the Berlin Wall. Press surrounding this release included a CBC documentary revisiting Russia with the group as well as three promotional videos that were in heavy rotation at MuchMusic in Canada. Bullseye Records re-issued the album for the first time on CD in 2001.

The next Dave Rave Conspiracy album, Three Octave Fantastic Hexagram, was released in 1994 and included many of the players from the Valentino's album along with former Washington Squares, Lauren Agnelli. However, the band broke up shortly afterward. Agnelli and Dave Rave formed an incredible creative partnership that resulted in three Agnelli & Rave albums over the next ten years including the critically acclaimed Cowboy Flowers Sessions, Heaven and Earth, and Confetti.

The Dave Rave Group's second album, Everyday Magic, was released in 2003 and featured players from his former bands such as Teenage Head, The Shakers and bands and musicians with whom he had worked as either a musician as a producer such as The Trews, Joe Mannix, and Kate Schrock. "Love Fades" and the title track "Everyday Magic" featuring ECMA winners and Juno nominees, The Trews, received airplay at Rock, AC and Campus radio. Dave also co-wrote The Trews' single, "I Can’t Say" with Jack Richardson. Other co-writing credits include bands such as Oliver Black, now Townline, and the Maddhatters and he continues to work with and mentor some of the hottest acts today.

Dave spends his time in Canada and the US playing live, producing, writing and coming up with more ideas to bring great musicians together. Dave Rave released his Anthology in two volumes worldwide on Bullseye Records in January 2006. He has also released his second jazz-pop album, In The Blue of My Dreams, with Mark McCarron in 2007 under the Bongobeat label. It was shortlisted for a Grammy that year. He spent 2008 writing, producing and touring the globe.

Dave Rave spent 2009 playing over 100 shows, including Grey Cup 2009 and three European tours and he had a chance to work again with the Trews on the song "How's Everything" on their Top 10 DVD. He also had time to record the album, Live with What You Know, which was released in June 2010 on the Bongo Beat label. Players on the album include members of The Trews, Plastic Heroes, Rick Andrew (The Shakers), Sonic Blue Sound Review, Mark McCarron, The Maddhatters, Gary Pig Gold and the debut of vocalist Kate MacDonald on "Silver Lines" among many other great musicians. Dave has already toured Europe twice in 2010 with one more European tour to go along with a tour of North America in support of the new record.

== Discography ==
=== Studio albums ===
- 1981 – The Shakers / In Time
- 1983 – The Shakers / Weekend
- 1990 – The Dave Rave Group / Valentino's Pirates
- 1994 – The Dave Rave Conspiracy / Three Octave Fantastic Hexagram

=== EPs ===
- 1990 – Dave Rave / Pure Honey

=== Compilation appearances ===
- 1998 – "Love of Money (Stupid Cupidity)" – Lauren Agnelli And Dave Rave / Somewhere Down The Road
- 2001 – "Xmas Wish List" – Dave Rave Xmas Spirits / Takin' Care of Christmas
- 2003 – "Love Fades" – The Dave Rave Group / International Pop Overthrow Vol. 6
- 2011 – "Your Sparks Fly" – Dave Rave / International Pop Overthrow Vol. 14
- 2012 – "You're My Sensation" – Dave Rave / International Pop Overthrow Vol. 15
- 2013 – "Rockin' to the Middle" – Dave Rave with Rick Andrew / International Pop Overthrow Vol. 16
- 2016 – "So Invisible" – Hailee Rose, Dave Rave / International Pop Overthrow Vol. 19

=== Writing credits ===
- 1985 – Teenage Head / Trouble in the Jungle
- 2005 – The Trews / Den of Thieves
- 2008 – Teenage Head with Marky Ramone / Teenage Head with Marky Ramone
- 2008 – The Black Tales / The Black Tales
- 2009 – The Trews / Acoustic – Friends & Total Strangers
- 2024 – Evan Rotella / Where I Stand, Happy To Be Here (album)

=== As producer ===
- 1985 – Teenage Head / Trouble in the Jungle
- 1985 – Teenage Head / Frantic Romantic single
