= Summersteps Records =

- Founded: 1996
- Founder: Eric Schlittler; Cassie Rose Kobeski
- Country of origin: United States
- Location: Dunmore, Pennsylvania

Summersteps Records is an independent record label located in Dunmore, Pennsylvania, United States. Formed by Eric Schlittler and Cassie Rose Kobeski in 1996 to release their home recordings on cassette tape, the label has grown to include other artists and to produce professional CDs and vinyl. Their premier act, Kid Icarus, was featured in Spin as artist of the day in August 2005.

Summersteps also released two tribute CDs to mysterious outsider Texas musician Jandek. The first one released in 2000 entitled Naked In The Afternoon and the second one released in 2005 entitled Down In A Mirror. Both tribute CDs featured artists both well known and obscure doing interpretations of Jandek songs as well as songs about the Jandek experience.

== Artists ==
- Kid Icarus
- Miss Cassie Rose and the Pickled Punks
- Amasa
- Boo Baby
- Brother JT
- Suetta
- Circles
- Crap-O-Phonic
- Das Black Milk
- Doses
- Fantasierock
- Floating Flower
- Giraffe Hair
- Lewis & Clarke
- Louch
- My Dad Is A Dinosaur
- Psychiatrone Rhonedakk
- The Green Chair
- The Marshmallow Staircase
- The SW!MS
- Tigers Jaw
- Why Did Johnny Kill?
- Youth Aflame (The Choppers)

== See also ==
- List of record labels
