= Kid Icarus (band) =

American indie rock band

- Origin: Dunmore, Pennsylvania, United States
- Genres: Indie rock
- Years active: 1996–present
- Labels: Summersteps Records
- Members: Eric Schlittler; Joe Marchegiani; Justin Marchegiani; Jeff Gilotti
- Past members: Thad Moyer; Jeff Schlittler; Ted Baird; Cassie Rose (Kobeski); Jason Johnson; Steve Guse; Ken Stevens; Psychatrone Rhonedakk
- Website: www.kidicarus1.bandcamp.com

Kid Icarus is an American indie rock group based in Dunmore, Pennsylvania, born of a solo recording project by Eric Schlittler. The band has released five full-length albums: Maps of the Saints, Be My Echo, The Metal West, Imaginary Songs & Aluminum Hits and American Ghosts.

== History ==
After leaving the band Suetta, Eric Schlittler began producing cassette recordings using inexpensive home equipment. Calling his project Kid Icarus after the 1986 Nintendo Entertainment System video game of the same name, Schlittler recorded Maps of the Saints in 1998 and 1999. The album contained lo-fi songs in the style of Guided by Voices, as well as psychedelic tracks influenced by Roky Erickson, Scott Walker, and Syd Barrett. Schlittler's next album, 2002's Be My Echo, included a mix of lo-fi rock and acoustic singer-songwriter music. A remastered reissue of Maps of the Saints followed in 2003. While Schlittler continued to write and record in his home studio, Kid Icarus grew as a project to incorporate his friends and other musicians in northeastern Pennsylvania. The Metal West, Kid Icarus's third album, was released in 2005, and marked Schlittler's first attempt at a hi-fi recording. The album featured contributions from guitarist Justin Marchegiani, bassist Ted Baird, drummer Thad Moyer, and keyboardist Chuck Keller. Spin magazine writer Lane Brown compared Schlittler's vocals to Elliott Smith, and called the band "Pavement on psychedelics." Mike Schiller of PopMatters described the album's lead track, "Beekeepers on the Edge of Town", as the "most obvious choice for a possible hit." Schiller added that the song sounded somewhat like The Hives, "if [singer] Howlin’ Pelle [Almqvist] was Dronin’ Pelle." Kid Icarus released a split 7-inch single with the band Das Black Milk in 2009.

== Current line-up ==
- Eric Schlittler – guitar, vocals
- Joe Marchegiani – bass
- Justin Marchegiani – guitar
- Jeff Gilotti – drums

== Discography ==
=== Albums ===
- 1996: The Angel Land Demos
- 1997: Try This at Home!
- 1998: Summer '98
- 1999: Maps of the Saints (re-issued 2003)
- 2002: Be My Echo
- 2005: The Metal West
- 2010: Imaginary Songs & Aluminum Hits
- 2011: American Ghosts

== EPs ==
- 2003: Split ep w/ The Green Chair
- 2011: Ghost Town Feelings
- 2013: Split 12-inch w/ Cold Coffee

== Singles ==
- 2009: "Kid Icarus" (released January 7)

== Videography ==
=== DVDs ===
- 2006: Live from the Belly of a Dying City

=== Videos ===
- 2006: "The Murderess"
