= The Gone Wait =

Studio album by Jandek
- Released: 2003
- Recorded: 2003
- Length: 39:34
- Label: Corwood Industries
- Producer: Jandek

Jandek chronology
The Place (2003)	The Gone Wait (2003)	Shadow of Leaves (2004)

Professional ratings
Review scores
Source	Rating
Allmusic	link

The Gone Wait is the 35th album by Jandek, and the first of two released in 2003 It is Corwood Industries release #0773, and is the first release to feature the artist accompanying himself on fretless electric bass, rather than on his usual acoustic or electric guitar. The album's title was also the name of a song on Jandek's 1993 release Twelfth Apostle.

== Track listing ==
No.	Title	Length
1.	"I Went To Hell"	6:39
2.	"I See The Open Door"	6:04
3.	"I Was A King"	10:24
4.	"I Just Might Go Now"	10:27
5.	"I Found The Right Chance"	6:00
Total length:		39:34
