= Nine-Thirty =

Studio album by Jandek
- Released: 1985
- Genres: Folk, outsider
- Length: 39:53
- Label: Corwood Industries
- Producer: Corwood Industries

Jandek chronology
Interstellar Discussion (1984)	Nine-Thirty (1985)	Foreign Keys (1985)

Professional ratings
Review scores
Source	Rating
OPtion Magazine	(favorable)

Nine-Thirty is the tenth album by Jandek, one of two released in 1985, and was released as Corwood 0748. It was reissued on CD in 2001.

== Track listing ==
No.	Title	Length
1.	"Tell Me When"	2:13
2.	"Left The Beach Last Sunday"	2:14
3.	"Bells and Voices"	2:28
4.	"Faye"	2:55
5.	"Wrong Time"	2:22
6.	"Voices in the Dark"	1:53
7.	"Green Dreams"	2:11
8.	"Blind Cat"	2:51
9.	"Georgia East"	2:35
10.	"May 3"	2:48
11.	"Nine-Thirty"	2:41
12.	"This is a Death Dream"	5:09
13.	"Tumblings"	2:33
14.	"You Didn't Lie"	2:02
15.	"Oh Jenny"	2:08
Total length:		39:53
