= Teenage Head (Teenage Head album) =

Studio album by Teenage Head
- Released: March 29, 1979
- Recorded: 1977–1978
- Genre: Punk rock
- Length: 36:16
- Producer: Alan Caddy, Stacy Heydon, Jack Morrow

Teenage Head chronology
Teenage Head (1979)	Frantic City (1980)

Professional ratings
Review scores
Source	Rating
Allmusic	4/5 stars

Teenage Head is the debut album by the Canadian punk rock band Teenage Head.

== Track listing ==
All songs were composed by Frank Kerr, Gordon Lewis, Steve Mahon, Nick Stipanitz.

No.	Title	Length
1.	"Top Down"	1:57
2.	"Ain't Got No Sense"	4:13
3.	"Bonerack"	3:36
4.	"Picture My Face"	3:02
5.	"Lucy Potato"	3:33
6.	"Curtain Jumper"	4:00
7.	"You're Tearin' Me Apart"	2:42
8.	"Little Boxes"	3:24
9.	"Get Off My Back"	3:57
10.	"Kissin' the Carpet"	5:12
Total length:		36:16

== Personnel ==
Teenage Head

- Frankie Venom (Kerr) - vocals
- Gordon Lewis - guitar
- Steve Mahon - bass
- Nick Stipanitz - drums, vocals, backing vocals

Additional musicians

- Kelly Jay - piano, harp
- Dave Rave - guitar (acoustic)

Production

- Alan Caddy - producer
- Stacy Heydon - producer
- Jack Morrow - producer
- Mick Walsh - engineer
- Robin Brouwers - assistant engineer
- Peter Himmelman - assistant engineer
- Peter Moore - mastering, mixing, remastering
- Chris Spedding - mixing
