= Glad to Get Away =

Glad To Get Away

Studio album by Jandek
- Released: 1994
- Genre: Folk, blues, outsider
- Length: 40:21
- Label: Corwood Industries
- Producer: Corwood Industries

Jandek chronology
Graven Image (album) (1994)	Glad To Get Away (1994)	White Box Requiem (1996)

Glad to Get Away is the 24th album by Jandek, and was released (1994) as Corwood Industries #0762. It continues the acoustic sound of the prior two albums.

== Track listing ==
No.	Title	Length
1.	"Bitter Tale"	2:25
2.	"Hey Mister Can You Tell Me"	3:33
3.	"Ezekiel"	2:49
4.	"Moon Dance"	2:22
5.	"Flowers on My Shirt"	2:36
6.	"Morning Drum"	2:58
7.	"Down Clown"	2:45
8.	"Rain in Madison"	2:19
9.	"Van Ness Mission"	3:03
10.	"Anticipation"	3:12
11.	"Nancy Knows"	3:10
12.	"Take My Will"	4:03
13.	"Plenty"	2:00
14.	"What"	3:06
Total length:		40:21

== Album cover description ==
Seth Tisue, on his coverage of Jandek discography, stated that the cover was "Almost identical to Graven Image. It looks like he stepped about ten feet to one side—you're looking down the driveway along the side of the house, instead of just at the back of the house—and took another photo."

Part of this album cover would be incorporated into both the trailer and the DVD cover of the documentary Jandek on Corwood.

== Reviews ==
Professional ratings
Review scores
Source	Rating
AllMusic	link
