= Put My Dream on This Planet =

Put My Dream On This Planet

Studio album by Jandek
- Released: 2000
- Recorded: Unknown
- Genre: A cappella, spoken word, outsider music
- Length: 52:15
- Label: Corwood Industries
- Producer: Corwood Industries

Jandek chronology
The Beginning (1999)	Put My Dream On This Planet (2000)	This Narrow Road (2001)

Professional ratings
Review scores
Source	Rating
AllMusic	3/5 stars

Put My Dream on This Planet is the 29th album by Jandek. It was his only new release of 2000 (note that there were numerous reissues of the oldest material). The first of three consecutive a capella albums, it is Corwood Industries #0767.

Initially thought by fans to have been recorded on a voice-activated microcassette recorder, Jandek clarified in his 2014 cover interview for The Wire that he recorded this album, as well as the two a capella followups, This Narrow Road and Worthless Recluse, on a standard consumer-grade cassette recorder, and that the pauses in the recording were removed per his request with a noise reduction gate during the mastering stage.

== Critical reception ==
Exclaim! wrote that "Jandek sounds old, with a deep, grainy, Johnny Cash-like voice that appears to be recorded by a portable microphone, as opposed to a crisp studio recording." The Globe and Mail thought that the album "would try the patience of the saints of any faith."

== Track listing ==
No.	Title	Length
1.	"I Need Your Life"	28:43
2.	"It's Your House"	22:14
3.	"I Went Outside"	1:17
Total length:		52:14
