= Teenage Head (band) =

Canadian punk rock band

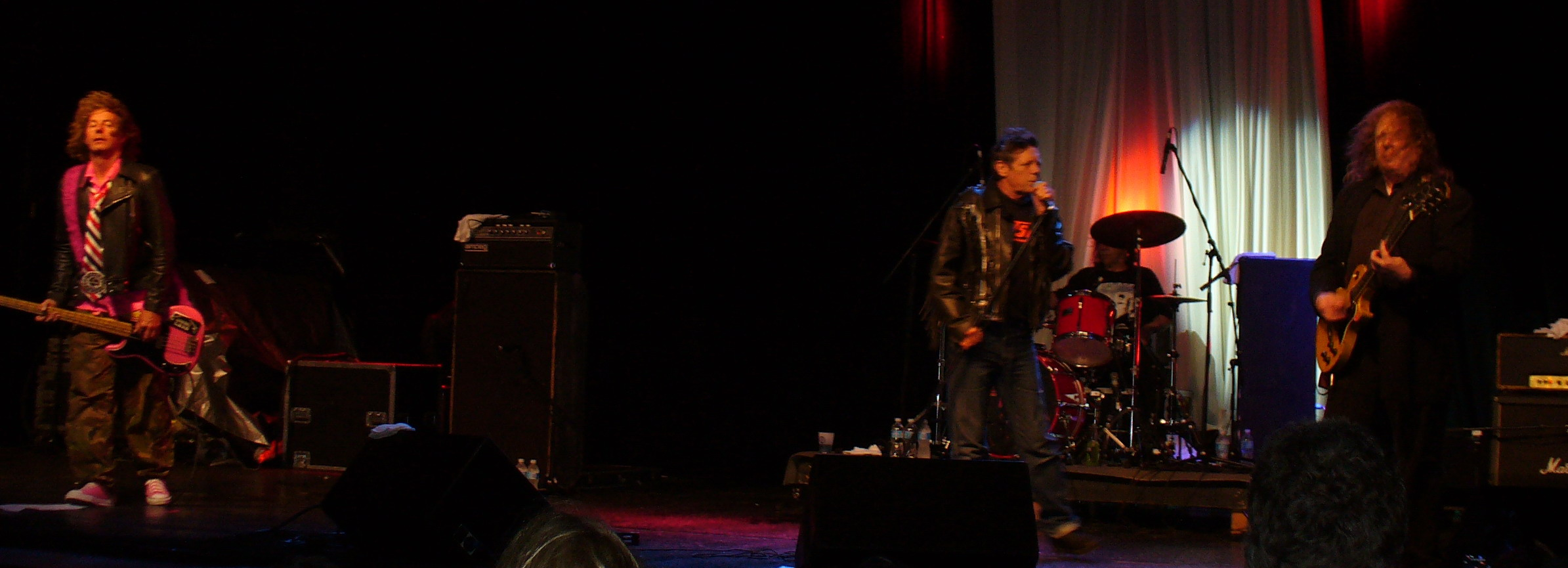
- Teenage Head in concert at the 2008 Friendship Festival in Fort Erie, Ontario, Canada

Background information
- Origin: Hamilton, Ontario, Canada
- Genres: Punk rock, garage rock
- Years active: 1974–present
- Labels: Epic, Attic, MCA, Ready, Warpt, Fringe, O.P.M., Loudrock, Sonic Unyon
- Members: Steve (Mahon) Marshall; Gene Champagne; Dave Desroches
- Past members: Gord Lewis; Steve Park; Frankie Venom (Kerr); Nick Stipanitz; Blair Richard Martin; Mark Lockerbie; Jack Pedlar; Pete MacAulay; David Bendeth

Teenage Head is a Canadian punk rock group from Hamilton, Ontario, that has been popular in Canada since the early 1980s.

The group was formed in Hamilton, Ontario in 1975 by Frankie Venom (Frank Kerr), Gord Lewis, Steve Mahon, and Nick Stipanitz.

Venom died on October 15, 2008. Lewis died August 7, 2022.

The band's name is a reference to The Flaming Groovies' 1971 album Teenage Head, which Gord Lewis had seen advertised in a music magazine but not heard, and decided that he, one day, would form a band with that name.

== History ==
Teenage Head was formed in 1975 when the band members were students at Westdale High School in Hamilton. The original lineup featured Gord Lewis on guitar, Steve Park on guitar, Frankie Venom on drums, and Dave Desroches on vocals. Frankie Venom quickly became the new vocalist, and Lewis recruited old friends Steve Mahon to play bass and Nick Stipanitz to play drums.

DesRoches moved on to form his own group, The Shakers. He rejoined Teenage Head as vocalist in the mid-1980s (for the album Electric Guitars), and yet again in 2016. Steve Park soon left and later joined another Hamilton band, Simply Saucer.

Their first gig was on October 17, 1975, in the Westdale Secondary School cafeteria. The band's first professional gigs happened in February 1976 with a few shows at the Town Casino at Main and Walnut streets in Hamilton.

By May 1978, they released their first single "Picture My Face" on Epic Records, and their self-titled debut, Teenage Head, followed a year later, which went gold. The band's performance at The Last Pogo concert on December 1, 1978, at The Horseshoe Tavern in Toronto, ended in a riot and was shut down by the police. The concert was made into a short film by Colin Brunton, The Last Pogo. In 2006, Brunton began a feature-length documentary film about the concert, including additional interviews and footage of Teenage Head. It was released on DVD in 2008 as a tribute to the late Frankie Venom.

Gold-selling Frantic City was released in 1980. It was the band's breakthrough album, making them stars across Canada with the hit singles "Let's Shake" and "Somethin' On My Mind". They toured to support that album, including opening the major Heatwave festival in August. In June 1980, their performance at Toronto's Ontario Place sparked a riot. The incident made headlines across the country, and led Ontario Place to ban rock concerts for several years.

In September 1980, riding high on the success of Frantic City and the band's unintended notoriety, Attic Records, their Canadian label, set up a series of showcase gigs in New York City, hoping to attract a U.S. record deal. Only a few days before their scheduled departure, Lewis was seriously injured in a car accident and the showcase was cancelled. Lewis was temporarily replaced by David Bendeth, although he was able to return in time to play on the 1982 album Some Kinda Fun, which was another success reaching gold status.

Their 1983 record Tornado was marked by controversy, with the band's new American label MCA Records demanding that they change their name to 'Teenage Heads' to placate the more conservative American audience. The title track was the band's last big hit in Canada. During this time the band appeared, as themselves, in the film Class of 1984 (starring fellow Canadian Michael J. Fox) and performed "Ain't Got No Sense".

In 1986, one year after the release of Trouble in the Jungle, Venom left the band to form a new group, Frankie Venom and The Vipers. Nick Stipanitz joined the Vipers as well. Venom was replaced by Dave Desroches, who led the band for three years before departing to form his own band, The Dave Rave Conspiracy. Stipanitz later left the Vipers and did a stint with The Tennessee Rockets. Venom and Stipanitz came back to Teenage Head when the group reformed in 1988, but Stipanitz left Teenage Head shortly after this reformation, and went into a professional career in drafting and engineering. He was first replaced by Blair Richard Martin of the Raving Mojos, then Mark Lockerbie, who played on the 1996 album, Head Disorder. Lockerbie was in turn replaced by Jack Pedler.

In 2003, the band recorded a host of previously released material with Ramones drummer Marky Ramone at Catherine North Studios in Hamilton and Metalworks Studios in Toronto with Ramones producer, Daniel Rey. The resulting album was released in Canada on April 22, 2008, titled Teenage Head with Marky Ramone. In early 2007, Teenage Head played in Alberta and British Columbia for the first time in more than ten years. They returned again in the spring of 2008.

On October 15, 2008, Gord Lewis announced that Frankie Venom had died at 52, following a battle with throat cancer. In 2014, a memorial statue of Frankie Venom had been planned in Venom's hometown of Hamilton, Ontario, but was stalled because of criticism of public funds being spent to commemorate a man who used illegal drugs and was once convicted for domestic assault. In 2021, a local artist painted a mural of Frankie Venom on the side of a building on Rebecca Street in Hamilton.

The remaining members of the band continued to perform after Venom's death playing a tribute show for him, and performing at the 2008 Hamilton Music Awards. In 2009, longtime fan and friend of the band, Pete MacAulay joined as the new singer, to in his words "take Frankie's space, not his place".

In 2014, Canadian writer Geoff Pevere published the book Gods of the Hammer: The Teenage Head Story. To help celebrate the book launch, the band played a guest vocalist night at the 2014 edition of Canadian Music Week. Musicians performing with Teenage Head that evening including the Dead Boys' Cheetah Chrome, Men Without Hats' Ivan Doroschuk, the Doughboys (Canadian band)' John Kastner and Change of Heart (band)'s Ian Blurton.

In November 2016, Teenage Head announced the return of Desroches as lead singer. Jack Pedler, due to illness was replaced by Gene Champagne, also of the Un-Teens and The Killjoys. In late 2017, Teenage Head began performing record release parties throughout Ontario for their new remix and remastered compilation, Fun Comes Fast.

On August 7, 2022, original member Gord Lewis was found murdered in his home at age 65. His son Jonathan Lewis was arrested shortly after the crime and charged with second-degree murder. Teenage Head said the band will continue with performances following Lewis' murder, as was his wish.

== Discography ==
=== Singles ===
Year	Title	Chart positions	Album
Year	Title	Canada (RPM)	Album
1978	"Picture My Face"		Teenage Head
1978	"Top Down"		Non-LP re-recording of a song originally from Teenage Head
1980	"Somethin' On My Mind"	28	Frantic City
1980	"Let's Shake"	88	Non-LP re-recording of a song originally from Frantic City
1982	"Some Kinda Fun"	23	Some Kinda Fun
1982	"Let's Go To Hawaii"		Some Kinda Fun
1983	"Tornado" (as Teenage Heads)	39	Tornado (EP)
1983	"Blood Boogie" (as Teenage Heads)		Tornado (EP)
1984	"Top Down" (live version)		Endless Party
1985	"Frantic Romantic"		Trouble In The Jungle
1987	"Can't Stop Shakin'"		Electric Guitar
1988	"Everybody Needs Somebody"		Electric Guitar

=== Studio albums ===
- 1979 – Teenage Head
- 1980 – Frantic City
- 1982 – Some Kinda Fun
- 1983 – Tornado EP (as "Teenage Heads")
- 1986 – Trouble in the Jungle
- 1988 – Electric Guitar
- 1996 – Head Disorder
- 2008 – Teenage Head with Marky Ramone

=== Live albums ===
- 1984 – Endless Party
- 2023 – Performance Live At Heatwave

=== Compilation album ===
- 2017 – Fun Comes Fast
