= New Town (Jandek album) =

Studio album by Jandek
- Released: 1998
- Recorded: Unknown
- Genres: Outsider music, folk
- Length: 40:46
- Label: Corwood Industries
- Producer: Corwood Industries

Jandek chronology
I Woke Up (1997)	New Town (1998)	The Beginning (1999)

New Town is the 27th studio album by the folk artist Jandek. It was released in 1998 on Corwood Industries. The album consists of Jandek's vocals and mostly guitar instrumentation.

== Track listing ==
No.	Title	Length
1.	"New Town"	4:14
2.	"Steal Away Home"	4:31
3.	"Street Walk"	3:45
4.	"You Standing There"	3:27
5.	"Desert Voice"	4:36
6.	"Let Me Hear the Words You Say"	3:24
7.	"The Real You"	2:27
8.	"It Would Only Be Action"	4:10
9.	"Look At It"	3:36
10.	"Time Will Come"	2:50
11.	"What You Are"	3:46
Total length:		40:46

== Reviews ==
Professional ratings
Review scores
Source	Rating
AllMusic	link
