= On the Way (Jandek album) =

On The Way

Studio album by Jandek
- Released: 1988
- Genre: Blues rock, avant-garde, folk
- Length: 43:45
- Label: Corwood Industries
- Producer: Corwood Industries

Jandek chronology
You Walk Alone (1988)	On The Way (1988)	The Living End (1989)

Professional ratings
Review scores
Source	Rating
Forced Exposure #12	(very favorable) link
LowLife #15	link
Sound Choice #17	link

On the Way is the seventeenth album by Jandek, released in 1988 as Corwood 0755. It was reissued on CD in 2002.

== Track listing ==
No.	Title	Length
1.	"Wrap It Up"	3:19
2.	"Bring It Back to Seventy-Five"	2:34
3.	"Message to the Clerk"	6:44
4.	"Give It the Name"	5:38
5.	"Ambient Instrument"	2:32
6.	"Sadie"	2:36
7.	"I'll Sit Alone and Think a Lot About You"	8:36
8.	"The Only Way You Can Go"	5:33
9.	"I'm Ready"	5:47
Total length:		43:45
