= Graven Image (album) =

Studio album by Jandek
- Released: 1994
- Genre: Outsider, folk, blues
- Length: 40:32
- Label: Corwood Industries
- Producer: Corwood Industries

Jandek chronology
Twelfth Apostle (1993)	Graven Image (1994)	Glad to Get Away (1996)

Graven Image is the 23rd album by Jandek, released in (1994) as Corwood Industries release #0761. Although a vinyl test pressing was created, it was the first Corwood product to be issued on CD, and was remastered and re-issued in 2004.

== Track listing ==
No.	Title	Length
1.	"Remain the Same"	1:36
2.	"Helena"	2:13
3.	"Ghost Town by the Sea"	3:03
4.	"A Real Number"	2:19
5.	"Be Going Down"	2:12
6.	"Nothing You Lack"	2:12
7.	"Chilocothe"	2:40
8.	"For You and I"	2:55
9.	"Janky"	2:34
10.	"Lake Lagoon"	2:45
11.	"Philip Was Mentioned"	3:08
12.	"Closing"	2:28
13.	"Fishing Blues"	2:52
14.	"Going Away My Darling"	5:13
15.	"Going Away"	2:22
Total length:		40:32
