= Your Turn to Fall =

Studio album by Jandek
- Released: 1983
- Genres: Folk, blues, outsider
- Length: 39:41
- Label: Corwood Industries
- Producer: Corwood Industries

Jandek chronology
Staring at the Cellophane (1982)	Your Turn to Fall (1983)	The Rocks Crumble (1983)

Professional ratings
Review scores
Source	Rating
AllMusic	3/5 stars
Op Magazine issue X	(favorable)

Your Turn to Fall is the seventh Jandek album, and was released as Corwood 0745. It was reissued on CD in 2001.

== Track listing ==
No.	Title	Length
1.	"Liquids Flow to the Sea"	4:14
2.	"Elementary Talk"	2:24
3.	"John Plays Drums"	2:28
4.	"No Time"	2:00
5.	"You Don't Have to Entertain Me"	1:53
6.	"Decree"	1:51
7.	"New String"	2:18
8.	"Echo"	2:43
9.	"Centaur Train"	2:26
10.	"Dance of Death"	2:22
11.	"If Your Fortune Fails You"	2:58
12.	"I'll Come Back"	2:52
13.	"About Today"	2:08
14.	"Such a Thrill"	1:35
15.	"Didn't Have To Cry"	2:15
16.	"They Knew My Game"	3:12
Total length:		39:41
