= Blue Corpse =

Studio album by Jandek
- Released: 1987
- Genre: Folk, blues, outsider
- Length: 43:27
- Label: Corwood Industries
- Producer: Corwood Industries

Jandek chronology
Modern Dances (1987)	Blue Corpse (1987)	You Walk Alone (1988)

Blue Corpse is the fifteenth album by Jandek, and his second for 1987. Primarily an all acoustic album with an unknown accompanist (identified only as "Eddie" during the instrumental break in "Down at the Ball Park"), it is considered by many to be one of the more accessible and cohesive albums in Jandek's oeuvre.

== Album cover ==
The cover of Blue Corpse completes the series of images that began with Telegraph Melts (1986) and was continued with Modern Dances (1987). While the cover of Modern Dances shows the artist standing still and looking forward, the cover of Blue Corpse shows the artist in mid stride, producing a blurred image of the artist.

== Album information ==
The tracks "I Passed by the Building" through "Variant" features an unknown man on lead vocals. The tracks "Part II" through "Only Lover" appear to switch up this arrangement and feature Jandek on lead vocals and the unknown accompanist playing blues guitar, with the except of "Harmonica" which features solo harmonica. "Quinn Boys" appears to be Jandek solo, while the closer "One Minute" features the unknown accompanist singing lead vocals and it is unknown who is playing drums.

== Track listing ==
No.	Title	Length
1.	"I Passed by the Building"	3:44
2.	"C F"	2:13
3.	"Variant"	1:52
4.	"Part II"	1:54
5.	"Your Other Man"	5:26
6.	"Long Way"	1:01
7.	"Down at the Ball Park"	2:31
8.	"Harmonica"	5:32
9.	"House of the Rising Sun"	4:34
10.	"Only Lover"	10:25
11.	"Quinn Boys"	2:03
12.	"One Minute"	1:15
Total length:		43:27

== Reviews ==
Professional ratings
Review scores
Source	Rating
Reflex 4/1988 link	
Away From The Pulsebeat, 1988 link	(favorable)
Option April 1988 link	(favorable)
AllMusic link	4/5 stars

This newer album contains more folk sounds and less of the dissonance Jandek is so well known for... Jandek's angst-ridden vocals... filled with trials and tribulations... -- Art Black Away From the Pulsebeat
