= White Box Requiem =

Studio album by Jandek
- Released: 1996
- Genre: Outsider, folk
- Length: 45:39
- Label: Corwood Industries
- Producer: Corwood Industries

Jandek chronology
| Glad to Get Away (1994) | White Box Requiem (1996) | I Woke Up (1997) |

Professional ratings
Review scores
| Source | Rating |
|---|---|
| AllMusic | 3/5 stars |

White Box Requiem is the 25th album by Jandek, and his only for the year 1996. Released as Corwood Industries #0763, it is essentially a "concept album" about death, loss, and a man who opens a mysterious white "Pandora's box", which some have speculated is a coffin. There are 14 songs with acoustic guitar, half of them with vocals. The instrumental pieces are sparse and experiment with echo, with "restless" passages that music critic Andre Salles has described as "consistently inventive atonal plonking that never sits still".

After not releasing any music in 1995, Jandek returned with White Box Requiem the following year.

== Track listing ==
| No. | Title | Length |
|---|---|---|
| 1. | "The Glade" | 1:23 |
| 2. | "White Box" | 3:48 |
| 3. | "Second Thoughts" | 1:40 |
| 4. | "Concrete Steps" | 3:43 |
| 5. | "Eternal Waltz" | 4:29 |
| 6. | "Thinking" | 1:41 |
| 7. | "Part Yesterday" | 3:02 |
| 8. | "Walking in the Meadow" | 7:45 |
| 9. | "Evening Sun" | 2:44 |
| 10. | "Must Have Been a Miracle" | 2:00 |
| 11. | "Wondering" | 2:44 |
| 12. | "What Should I Do" | 1:46 |
| 13. | "Approaching the City" | 4:27 |
| 14. | "Didn't Really Die" | 4:27 |
| Total length: | | 45:39 |

== Reception ==
Writing for AllMusic, Skip Jansen calls the album a collection of "fractured songs...drenched in the atonal ambience that makes his contribution such a standout. For lo-fi wayward mavericks, it doesn't come more outside than this".

Seth Tisue, a Jandek discographer, has characterized White Box Requiem as "almost catatonically mopey and meandering... He sounds hopeless." In contrast to Blue Corpse (1987), which Tisue describes as "a record about emotional devastation with some perspective in it", in White Box Requiem, the emotion comes "from totally inside it".

In a review of White Box Requiem for In Music We Trust, Gary Gold writes, "[Jandek's] songs remain as starkly beautiful as a David Lynch opening shot, and the accompaniment (imagine handing your most ornery nine-year-old nephew a $29 guitar before locking him for three days in a windowless basement) remains as brutally poignant as ever."
