= I Woke Up =

Studio album by Jandek
- Released: 1997
- Genre: Outsider, folk
- Length: 37:05
- Label: Corwood Industries
- Producer: Corwood Industries

Jandek chronology
| White Box Requiem (1996) | I Woke Up (1997) | New Town (1998) |

I Woke Up is the 26th album by Jandek and his only release of 1997. Released as Corwood Industries #0764, it introduced (for the first and last time) a new male vocalist who sings most of the tracks.

== Track listing ==
| No. | Title | Length |
|---|---|---|
| 1. | "First Awake Moment" | 2:26 |
| 2. | "Alone on that Mountain" | 3:53 |
| 3. | "I Can Not" | 4:03 |
| 4. | "Get Back Inside" | 3:00 |
| 5. | "Long Long" | 3:47 |
| 6. | "Joab" | 2:40 |
| 7. | "Equaled in Life" | 2:16 |
| 8. | "Star of Zenith" | 3:55 |
| 9. | "Take it Easy" | 2:09 |
| 10. | "Just Die" | 3:53 |
| 11. | "Pending Doom" | 1:15 |
| 12. | "Sleepless Night" | 2:22 |
| 13. | "Today" | 1:26 |
| Total length: | | 37:05 |

== Reviews ==
Professional ratings
Review scores
| Source | Rating |
|---|---|
| AllMusic | link |
