= Lost Cause (Jandek album) =

Studio album by Jandek
- Released: 1992
- Recorded: Unknown
- Genre: Blues; garage rock; pop; outsider
- Length: 43:13
- Label: Corwood Industries
- Producer: Corwood Industries

Jandek chronology
One Foot in the North (1991)	Lost Cause (1992)	Twelfth Apostle (1993)

Professional ratings
Review scores
Source	Rating
Allmusic	3/5 stars

Lost Cause is the 21st album by Jandek, and his only of 1992. Corwood Industries release #0759, it marks the end of the "electric phase", features a little of all the styles on the previous 20 albums and ends with a sidelong abstract improvisation called "The Electric End".

== Track listing ==
No.	Title	Length
1.	"Green and Yellow"	4:10
2.	"Babe I Love You"	4:13
3.	"Cellar"	1:48
4.	"How Many Places"	3:03
5.	"Crack a Smile"	3:09
6.	"God Came Between Us"	3:33
7.	"I Love You Now it's True"	2:59
8.	"The Electric End"	19:39
Total length:		43:13
