= Chair Beside a Window =

Chair Beside A Window

Studio album by Jandek
- Released: 1982
- Genres: Folk, blues, outsider
- Length: 43:24
- Label: Corwood Industries
- Producer: Corwood Industries

Jandek chronology
Later On (1981)	Chair Beside A Window (1982)	Living in a Moon So Blue (1982)

Professional ratings
Review scores
Source	Rating
Forced Exposure	(favorable)
AllMusic	3/5 stars

Chair Beside a Window is the fourth album by avant- folk/ blues singer-songwriter Jandek, and Corwood Industries' first release of 1982 (No. 742).

It is the first Jandek album to feature a female vocalist.

It is also the first album to reprise the song "European Jewel" after its "incomplete" version abruptly ended Jandek's debut album four years prior.

== Track listing ==
No.	Title	Length
1.	"Down in a Mirror"	4:33
2.	"European Jewel"	4:34
3.	"Unconditional Authority"	3:49
4.	"Poor Boy"	2:55
5.	"You Think You Know How to Score"	2:30
6.	"Nancy Sings"	2:55
7.	"No Break"	3:16
8.	"Mostly All from You"	3:03
9.	"Blue Blister"	2:24
10.	"The Times"	3:27
11.	"Love, Love"	4:19
12.	"The First End"	4:42
Total length:		43:24

== Covers ==
Adam Stafford and The Death Bridge Convention covered "Nancy Sings" in the album Music in the Mirrabell in 2010.
