= Ready for the House =

Studio album by Jandek
- Released: 1978
- Genres: Folk, acoustic blues
- Length: 44:32
- Labels: Corwood Industries (Original LP and CD releases); Jackpot Records (2008 LP Reissue)
- Producer: Corwood Industries

Jandek chronology
Ready for the House (1978)	Six and Six (1981)

Professional ratings
Review scores
Source	Rating
AllMusic	4/5 stars
Op Magazine, issue L	(favorable)
Forced Exposure	(?)

Ready for the House is the debut studio album by Jandek, and was released in 1978 by his own label Corwood Industries, with the catalog number #0739. Jandek has said in letters that the number was meaningless. Corwood Industries reissued the album three times on CD, first in 1999, then sometime in the early 2000s, and again in 2005. Jackpot Records, with exclusive permission from Corwood, reissued the album on LP in 2008.

== Album artwork ==
The album cover features a photograph of a garishly colored room with a chair beside a window. The artwork of the original 1978 issue lacks text, while the back cover credits the album to "The Units".

== Album information ==
The album was not originally attributed to Jandek at all, but rather to "the Units." The name Jandek replaced that of the Units on all future releases after a San Francisco new wave group of the same name gave Corwood Industries a cease and desist order; all subsequent reissues of Ready for the House now bear the Jandek name. Both "The Units" and "Jandek" are widely assumed to be the work of a Houston resident named Sterling Richard Smith. The name Jandek, according to Smith in a 1985 interview with John Trubee, comes from a conversation Smith had with a man named Decker in the month of January. The combination of January and Decker forms Jan-deck. Smith said the reasoning behind this was to come up with a name that nobody would pick, to avoid future legal problems. It is not publicly known if Corwood is also a combination of names. In early letters, Smith refers to the Jandek records as 'units', so one could take the band name 'The Units' to basically mean 'The Albums', this would even fit in with Jandek's aesthetic, which is very bare bones and stripped down to nothing.

Ready for the House was released with the catalog number #0739. There is no meaning behind the number, and all subsequent releases continue in order.

The music on the album consists of Jandek's wavering voice and a guitar pick gently plucking very oddly tuned guitar strings. The guitar playing, which many refer to as "untuned" is in fact tuned to what the artist has referred to as a "black key sound." Eight of the nine tracks largely repeat the same slow, slightly bluesy tempo with similar vocal delivery. On the ending track, "European Jewel (Incomplete)," Jandek switches from the acoustic to a strummed electric guitar that approaches standard tuning and instead of picking the strings, Jandek barres the frets. In the middle of the line "just a shaking sha-" the song abruptly cuts off, leading one to think that the tape has run out or that an error has occurred with the reel to reel tape recorder, and the album unexpectedly ends. The song would be resumed on Chair Beside a Window, beginning with the last three lines of the "incomplete" version and then continuing with the missing lyrics. The Chair Beside a Window version features what appears to be a live band version with electric guitar, bass, and drums. It revisited three more times on the album The Rocks Crumble, and it is assumed that Smith is overdubbing himself that time around, having told Chusid that there were instances of this in his letter. There are many notable instances where Jandek albums abruptly end so one could assume this is a motif.

It is unknown when this album was originally recorded. According to the Irwin Chusid article 'The Great Disconnect', around November 1980, Smith told Chusid that he had recorded enough material for 10 albums and hoped to release them all. This would back up the theory that the albums were recorded before 1978. On Ready for the House and its follow up Six and Six, Smith's voice sounds the youngest out of all of his output. Smith has provided very little in the way of background information on any of his albums, let alone Ready for the House. The only information that he was able to provide was that he pressed 1,000 copies of Ready for the House, where as all subsequent recordings were pressed in quantities of 300 (although it is not known if any were repressed). This is probably due to the fact that by 1980 when Smith spoke to Chusid, he had only sold 2 copies of the album despite it being released 2 years previous. It received its first review, when Phil X. Milstein wrote about it in Op magazine issue L. Shortly after, outsider DJ Irwin Chusid of WFMU began corresponding with Corwood Industries, a label that has held the same PO box since this release, and which releases nothing but Jandek records. Through this attention, the artist was encouraged to return to music, releasing Six and Six three years later, which has been the longest period without a studio Jandek release until the period after Ghost Passing.

== Track listing ==
No.	Title	Length
1.	"Naked in the Afternoon"	4:51
2.	"First You Think Your Fortune's Lovely"	8:10
3.	"What Can I Say, What Can I Sing"	4:51
4.	"Show Me the Way, O Lord"	4:18
5.	"Know Thy Self"	2:38
6.	"They Told Me About You"	4:33
7.	"Cave In on You"	4:26
8.	"They Told Me I Was a Fool"	5:08
9.	"European Jewel (Incomplete)"	4:56
Total length:		44:32
