= Jandek =

American musician

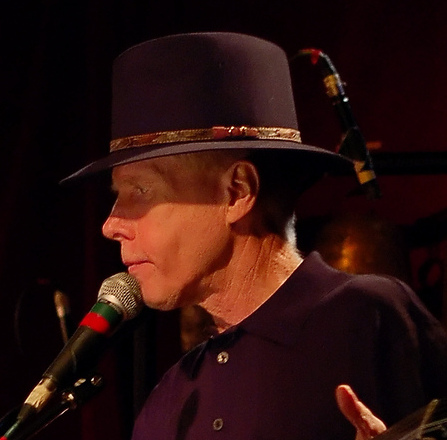
- Jandek performing in 2007

Background information
- Born: Sterling Smith; October 26, 1945 (age 81)
- Origin: Houston, Texas, U.S.
- Genres: Lo-fi, folk, blues, outsider music
- Years active: 1978–present
- Label: Corwood Industries
- Website: corwoodindustries.com

Jandek is the musical project of Sterling Smith (born October 26, 1945), a Houston, Texas-based American lo-fi folk singer. Since 1978, Jandek has independently released over 120 albums while granting an interview extremely rarely and providing no biographical information, releasing on a self-made label, "Corwood Industries". Jandek often plays an idiosyncratic and frequently atonal form of folk and blues music, frequently using an open and unconventional chord structure. AllMusic has described Jandek as "the most enigmatic figure in American music."

== History ==
A review of the debut album Ready for the House (1978) in OP Magazine, the first ever national press given to Jandek, referred to the artist as Sterling Smith. Smith has kept his personal history secret, revealing only one story about his pre-Corwood years: he wrote seven novels but burned them upon rejection from New York publishers.

In a 1985 private phone conversation with John Trubee for Spin, Smith mentioned that he was working at that time as a machinist.

Jandek's first album, Ready for the House, though a solo work, was originally credited to a band called The Units. Corwood was forced to change the name by an identically named Californian group already in possession of a trademark on the name. All reissues of this first album and all subsequent Corwood releases have been credited to "Jandek". In Trubee's unauthorized interview, Smith claims he came up with the name Jandek while on the telephone with a person named Decker during the month of January. Nirvana frontman Kurt Cobain discussed Jandek in a 1993 interview, stating "He's not pretentious, but only pretentious people like his music."

In 1999, Texas Monthly reporter Katy Vine interviewed a man she believed to be Jandek, though he refused to identify himself, and although familiar with Jandek's music, refused to discuss it. In 2003, filmmaker Chad Freidrichs released a documentary, Jandek on Corwood, which contained no interviews with Jandek but was put together with "a representative of Corwood Industries".

On October 17, 2004, at the Instal Festival in Glasgow, Scotland, an unannounced and unidentified act (playing alongside bassist Richard Youngs and drummer Alex Neilson) performed at the festival. This was later confirmed to be Jandek in his first live performance. Jandek has since made numerous live performances, usually unannounced in advance.

On October 29, 2026, it was announced via Jandek's official Instagram page, by his manager Sheila Smith, that Jandek will no longer perform live in concert. It is currently unknown if Jandek will continue to record & create music.

== Discography ==
This is also the discography of Corwood Industries; the record company releases only albums by Jandek.

- 0739: Ready for the House (1978)
- 0740: Six and Six (1981)
- 0741: Later On (1981)
- 0742: Chair Beside a Window (1982)
- 0743: Living in a Moon So Blue (1982)
- 0744: Staring at the Cellophane (1982)
- 0745: Your Turn to Fall (1983)
- 0746: The Rocks Crumble (1983)
- 0747: Interstellar Discussion (1984)
- 0748: Nine-Thirty (1985)
- 0749: Foreign Keys (1985)
- 0750: Telegraph Melts (1986)
- 0751: Follow Your Footsteps (1986)
- 0752: Modern Dances (1987)
- 0753: Blue Corpse (1987)
- 0754: You Walk Alone (1988)
- 0755: On the Way (1988)
- 0756: The Living End (1989)
- 0757: Somebody in the Snow (1990)
- 0758: One Foot in the North (1991)
- 0759: Lost Cause (1992)
- 0760: Twelfth Apostle (1993)
- 0761: Graven Image (1994)
- 0762: Glad to Get Away (1994)
- 0763: White Box Requiem (1996)
- 0764: I Woke Up (1997)
- 0765: New Town (1998)
- 0766: The Beginning (1999)
- 0767: Put My Dream on This Planet (2000)
- 0768: This Narrow Road (2001)
- 0769: Worthless Recluse (2001)
- 0770: I Threw You Away (2002)
- 0771: The Humility of Pain (2002)
- 0772: The Place (2003)
- 0773: The Gone Wait (2003)
- 0774: Shadow of Leaves (2004)
- 0775: The End of It All (2004)
- 0776: The Door Behind (2004)
- 0777: A Kingdom He Likes (2004)
- 0778: When I Took That Train (2005)
- 0779: Glasgow Sunday (2005) (rec. October 17, 2004)
- 0780: Raining Down Diamonds (2005)
- 0781: Khartoum (2005)
- 0782: Khartoum Variations (2006)
- 0783: Newcastle Sunday (2006) 2CD (rec. May 22, 2005)
- 0784: What Else Does the Time Mean? (2006)
- 0785: Glasgow Monday (2006) 2CD (rec. May 23, 2005)
- 0786: Austin Sunday (2006) 2CD (rec. August 28, 2005)
- 0787: The Ruins of Adventure (2006)
- 0788: Manhattan Tuesday (2007) 2CD (rec. September 6, 2005)
- 0789: Brooklyn Wednesday (2007) 4CD (rec. September 7, 2005)
- 0790: The Myth of Blue Icicles (2008)
- 0791: Glasgow Friday (2008) (rec. October 14, 2005)
- 0792: Glasgow Sunday 2005 (2008) (rec. October 16, 2005)
- 0793: London Tuesday (2008) (rec. October 18, 2005)
- 0794: Skirting the Edge (2008)
- 0795: Hasselt Saturday (2009) (rec. November 12, 2005)
- 0796: Helsinki Saturday (2009) (rec. November 19, 2005)
- 0797: Not Hunting For Meaning (2009)
- 0798: Portland Thursday (2009) 2CD (rec. April 20, 2006)
- 0799: What Was Out There Disappeared (2009)
- 0800: Camber Sands Sunday (2009) (rec. May 14, 2006)
- 0801: Bristol Wednesday (2010) 2CD (rec. May 17, 2006)
- 0802: Canticle of Castaway (2010)
- 0803: Toronto Sunday (2010) 2CD (rec. September 17, 2006)
- 0804: Chicago Wednesday (2010) 2CD (rec. September 20, 2006)
- 0805: Where Do You Go From Here? (2011)
- 0806: Seattle Friday (2011) 2CD (rec. October 27, 2006)
- 0807: Indianapolis Saturday (2012) 2CD / (2023) DVD (rec. December 9, 2006)
- 0808: Maze of the Phantom (2012) 2CD
- 0809: Atlanta Saturday (2012) 2CD (rec. February 17, 2007)
- 0810: Richmond Sunday (2012) 2CD (rec. March 11, 2007)
- 0811: The Song of Morgan (2013) 9CD
- 0812: Athens Saturday (2013) 2CD (rec. July 28, 2012)
- 0813: Houston Saturday (2014) CD / (2022) DVD (rec. June 1, 2013)
- 0814: Ghost Passing (2014) 6CD (rec. February 14, 2009)
- 0815: Houston Saturday 2011 (2014) (rec. December 17, 2011)
- 0816: St. Louis Friday (2015) DVD / (2015) 2CD (rec. March 21, 2014)
- 0817: Brussels Saturday (2015) DVD / (2015) CD (rec. April 19, 2014)
- 0818: Houston Thursday (2015) DVD / (2016) CD (rec. July 12, 2012)
- 0819: Los Angeles Saturday (2015) DVD / (2021) CD (rec. May 24, 2014)
- 0820: Dublin Friday (2016) CD / (2017) DVD (rec. June 13, 2008)
- 0821: London Residency (2017) DVD / (2017) 6CD (rec. February 14–16, 2014)
- 0822: New Orleans Monday (2016) CD / (2017) DVD (rec. March 16, 2009)
- 0823: Austin Tuesday (2017) DVD / (2017) CD (rec. February 16, 2016)
- 0824: Dallas Thursday (2017) CD / (2017) DVD (rec. May 19, 2016)
- 0825: Houston Friday (2017) 2CD / (2017) DVD (rec. January 6, 2017)
- 0826: San Francisco Friday (2018) 2CD / (2018) DVD (rec. October 9, 2015)
- 0827: Hamman Hall (2018) 2CD / (2018) DVD (rec. April 21, 2017)
- 0828: Houston Tuesday (2018) 2CD / (2018) DVD (rec. October 20, 2015)
- 0829: Los Angeles Friday (2018) DVD / (2018) 2CD (rec. August 5, 2016)
- 0830: London Thursday (2018) 2CD (rec. April 4, 2013)
- 0831: Gainesville Monday (2019) DVD (Rec. December 1, 2008)
- 0832: The Ray (2019) CD
- 0833: Austin Sunday 2007 (2019) CD / (2019) DVD (rec. March 17, 2007)
- 0834: Berlin Sunday (2020) DVD / (2020) CD (rec. November 12, 2017)
- 0835: Manhattan Saturday (2020) 3CD / (2020) DVD (rec. April 14, 2007)
- 0836: Boston Friday (2020) 2CD / (2022) DVD (rec. June 8, 2007)
- 0837: Montreal Sunday (2020) 2CD / (2020) DVD (rec. June 24, 2007)
- 0838: Fort Worth Saturday (2020) 2CD / (2020) DVD (rec. July 21, 2007)
- 0839: Rudyard's (2020) DVD / (2020) CD (rec. April 5, 2009)
- 0840: Grinnell Saturday (2020) 2CD (rec. October 6, 2007)
- 0841: Amsterdam Saturday (2020) CD (rec. November 10, 2007)
- 0842: Aarhus Sunday (2020) 2CD (rec. November 11, 2007)
- 0843: San Francisco Saturday (2020) 2CD / (2021) DVD (rec. January 12, 2008)
- 0844: Austin Saturday (2021) CD (rec. March 15, 2008)
- 0845: Philadelphia Saturday (2021) 2CD / (2021) DVD (rec. April 12, 2008)
- 0846: Ann Arbor Saturday (2021) 2CD (rec. May 17, 2008)
- 0847: London Sunday (2021) 2CD / (2021) DVD (rec. June 15, 2008)
- 0848: London Monday (2021) CD (rec. June 16, 2008)
- 0849: Denver Friday (2021) DVD / (2021) 2CD (rec. July 25, 2008)
- 0850: Columbus Friday (2021) 2CD (rec. October 10, 2008)
- 0851: The Mountain Step (2021) CD
- 0852: Porto Saturday (2021) 2CD (rec. January 10, 2009)
- 0853: Chapel Hill Sunday (2022) 2CD / (2022) DVD (rec. February 22, 2009)
- 0854: Motion Energy (2021) 2CD
- 0855: Manhattan Thursday (2022) 2CD (rec. April 23, 2009)
- 0856: Diverseworks (2022) 2CD / (2022) DVD (rec. May 3, 2009)
- 0857: Northern Ireland July (2023) 5CD / 1DVD (rec. July 19-22, 2009)
- 0858: The Wizards Hour (2023) CD (rec. September 5, 2009)
- 0859: Brooklyn Sunday (2023) 2CD (rec. September 6, 2009)
- 0860: Tilburg Saturday (2022) CD (rec. September 19, 2009)
- 0862: Vienna Wednesday (2023) 2CD (rec. October 14, 2009)
- 0863: Nashville Friday (2023) 2CD (rec. October 30, 2009)
- 0864: Vision of Jewels (2023) CD
- 0865: Baltimore Saturday (2023) 2CD (rec. November 14, 2009)
- 0866: Vancouver Monday (2025) 2CD (December 7th, 2009)
- 0867: Victoria Wednesday (2024) 2CD (rec. December 9th, 2009)
- 0868: Three Movements (2024) CD
- 0870: Portland Thursday (2025) 2CD
- 0871: Detroit Friday (2025) DVD
- 0873: Mankato Saturday (2025) 2CD (rec. October 20, 2012)

== Bibliography ==
- 0127: The Rays Of Light That Did Not Illumine (2021)
- 0128: The Element of Nothing (2024)
