= The Living End (Jandek album) =

Studio album by Jandek
- Released: 1989
- Genres: Folk, outsider
- Length: 43:38
- Label: Corwood Industries
- Producer: Corwood Industries

Jandek chronology
On The Way (1988)	The Living End (1989)	Somebody in the Snow (1990)

Professional ratings
Review scores
Source	Rating
CMJ #211	favorable link
LowLife #16	favorable link

The Living End is the eighteenth album by outsider musician Jandek, his only release in 1989. Corwood Industries #0756 continues the bluesy band sound of the prior two albums, with the addition of a female vocalist.

== Track listing ==
No.	Title	Length
1.	"Niagra Blues"	3:46
2.	"Janitor's Dead"	3:11
3.	"Slinky Parade"	4:31
4.	"The Living End"	2:25
5.	"License to Kill"	2:38
6.	"Talk That Talk"	6:28
7.	"Start the Band"	1:41
8.	"Girls From America"	1:56
9.	"Embrace the World Outside"	2:08
10.	"In a Hush"	2:50
11.	"Take Me Away With You"	7:05
12.	"Crazy"	4:23
Total length:		43:38
