= Telegraph Melts =

Studio album by Jandek
- Released: 1986
- Recorded: Unknown
- Genre: no wave, experimental rock
- Length: 43:36
- Label: Corwood Industries
- Producer: Corwood Industries

Jandek chronology
Foreign Keys (1985)	Telegraph Melts (1986)	Follow Your Footsteps (1986)

Professional ratings
Review scores
Source	Rating
Sound Choice #6	(favorable)
Away From The Pulsebeat, Winter 1987	(favorable)
AllMusic	2.5/5 stars

Telegraph Melts is the twelfth album and first release of 1986 by musician Jandek. It was released as Corwood Industries #0750.

== Track listing ==
No.	Title	Length
1.	"You"	1:38
2.	"On the Planes"	2:48
3.	"Go to Bed"	2:46
4.	"Ace of Diamonds"	4:43
5.	"Twenty Four"	4:55
6.	"No Slow Ones"	3:00
7.	"Telegraph Melts"	4:04
8.	"Governor Rhodes"	5:06
9.	"Star Up in the Sky"	3:34
10.	"You Painted Your Teeth"	3:04
11.	"Mother's Day Card"	1:37
12.	"The Fly"	3:17
13.	"House Up On the Hill"	2:22
Total length:		43:36
