= Forced Exposure =

American independent music magazine

Forced Exposure was an independent music magazine founded by Jimmy Johnson and Katie The Kleening Lady (Goldman) (zine). It was published sporadically out of Boston from 1982 to 1993, edited by Jimmy Johnson and Byron Coley. It was printed on cheap newsprint with plain design and filled with corrosive yet humorous writing. The first issue featured Boston Hardcore band SS Decontrol on the cover.

While there were articles and reviews of various counter-culture figures in literature (Charles Bukowski, William S. Burroughs, Philip K. Dick) and film (Richard Kern, Nick Zedd), the primary focus was independent, punk, and obscure music. The tone was often sarcastic, confrontational and highly opinionated. Coley in particular wrote in a vernacular that was influential on subsequent rock journalism.

The list of contributors and interviewees includes several prominent figures in underground music from the time: Steve Albini, Mission of Burma, Sonic Youth, Lydia Lunch, Chris D., Tesco Vee, et cetera. The last issue of the magazine, #18, was released in 1993. Forced Exposure now exists as a distributor of CDs and vinyl records.

One reviewer said of the magazine, "What separates Forced Exposure from other alternative music and art magazines is the intelligence and intensity of its editorial style".
