= Birchville Cat Motel =

One-man experimental music project

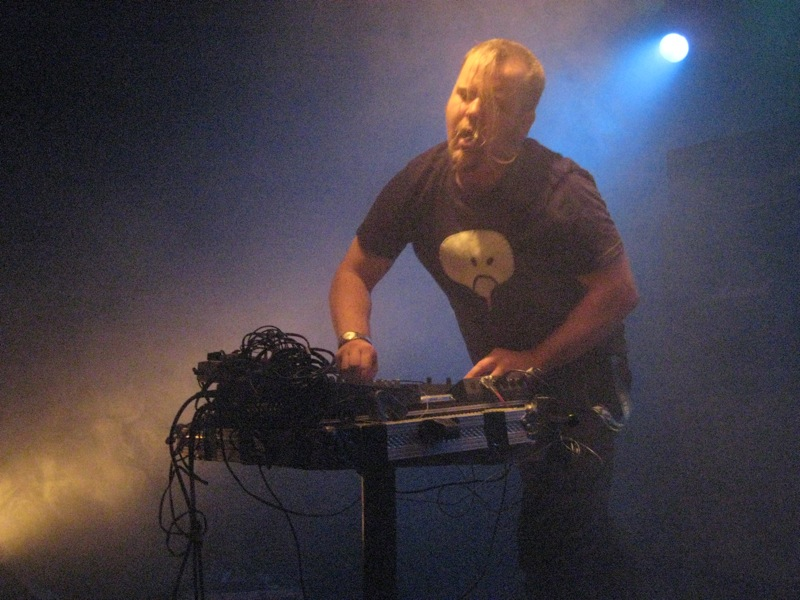
- Birchville Cat Motel at club transmediale in 2007

Background information
- Born: Campbell Kneale
- Origin: Wellington, New Zealand
- Genres: Drone ambient, dark ambient, experimental music
- Instruments: Guitar, Synthesizer
- Labels: Freedom From, Table of the Elements

Birchville Cat Motel is a one-man experimental music project formed by Campbell Kneale from Wellington, New Zealand. Although largely unrecognised by the mainstream press and public in his home country, Kneale has toured throughout Japan, America, Europe, and Australia. His first vinyl release was Jewelled Wings on the Freedom From label. Many of Kneale's rare and out of print recordings have been reissued recently on a 6cdr collection entitled Chaos Steel Skeletons.

Kneale operates the labels Celebrate Psi Phenomenon and Battlecruiser which have issued CDs by artists from New Zealand and overseas, including Matthew Bower (under the name Mirag) and Simon Wickham-Smith with recent releases by Richard Youngs and Alex Neilson and one involving Tony Conrad. Kneale has used Birchville Cat Motel as a vehicle for many collaborations with other musicians, including Lee Ranaldo, Neil Campbell, and Bruce Russell. He also records under the names Black Boned Angel, Brilliant Swords, and Ming and compiled the Prince tribute album Shut Up Already Damn!.

After being active as Birchville Cat Motel for 10 years, Campbell disbanded this project to focus on his new project Our Love Will Destroy The World, and has been releasing under that name from 2009 onwards.
