= Telstar Ponies =

Scottish rock band

- Origin: Glasgow, Scotland
- Years active: 1994–present
- Label: Fire Records
- Members: David Keenan; Rachel Devine; Gavin Laird; Kenneth Broom; Raymond Prior
- Past members: Neil Grant; Sushil K. Dade; John Hogarty; Brendan O’Hare; Richard Youngs

Telstar Ponies were a Scottish rock band formed in Glasgow in 1994. Their musical style varies considerably but displays influences from Krautrock, folk (especially latterly), and experimental noise.

== History ==
They were formed in 1994 by David Keenan on leaving 18 Wheeler. The original line-up included drummer Neil Grant as well as Sushil K Dade (ex-Soup Dragons, BMX Bandits, later of Future Pilot A.K.A.) on bass and John Hogarty (ex-BMX Bandits, later of National Park) on guitar. Grant was replaced on drums by Brendan O'Hare (ex-Teenage Fanclub) in time for the recording of their first single "Maps and Starcharts". By the time this single was released Dade and Hogarty had been replaced by Gavin Laird and Rachel Devine. This line-up recorded two albums, In The Space of a Few Minutes and Voices From The New Music, adding Richard Youngs to the line-up for the latter. They split up in 1997, following the departures of both O'Hare and Laird, who formed Macrocosmica.

They reformed minus O'Hare in 1999. A third album was recorded, mixed by Christoph Heemann and Andrew Chalk, but was never released. The band's contemporary status was described at one point as being on "long term sabbatical" by Devine, Laird and Prior, who have formed The Porch Song Anthology in the meantime. Keenan plays with Taurpis Tula and Tight Meat Duo, curates the Subcurrent music festival and runs Volcanic Tongue, a shop, label and distributor specialising in outsider music.

== Members ==
First line-up

- David Keenan (vocals, guitar)
- Neil Grant (drums)
- Sushil K. Dade (bass)
- John Hogarty (guitar)

Second line-up

- David Keenan (vocals, guitar)
- Rachel Devine (vocals, guitar, violin)
- Gavin Laird (bass, vocals)
- James SK Wān (vocals, brass)
- Brendan O’Hare (drums, guitar, vocals)
- Richard Youngs - (vocals, keyboards, violin, guitar—2nd album only)

Reformation line-up

- David Keenan (vocals, guitar)
- Rachel Devine (vocals, guitar)
- Gavin Laird (guitar, vocals)
- Kenneth Broom - (drums, saxophone)
- Raymond Prior (bass, vocals)

== Discography ==
=== Singles ===
- "Maps and Starcharts" (1994) Fire Records
- Not Even Starcrossed EP (1995) Fire
- "Her Name" (1995) Fire
- Mors Factum Musica EP (1996) Instant Mayhem
- "Does Your Heart Have Wings?" (1996) Fire
- "Brewery of Eggshells" (1996) Fire
- "Voices From the New Music" (1997) Fire (withdrawn)
- "Farewell Farewell" (1999) Geographic
- Hares on the Mountain EP (2002) Static Caravan-Obelisk

=== Albums ===
- In the Space of a Few Minutes (1995) Fire
- Voices From the New Music (1996) Fire
