= Glasgow Monday =

Live album by Jandek

Live album by Jandek
- Released: July 2006
- Recorded: May 23, 2005
- Length: 84:56
- Label: Corwood Industries
- Producer: Jandek

Jandek chronology
| What Else Does the Time Mean? (2006) | Glasgow Monday (2006) | Austin Sunday (2006) |

Professional ratings
Review scores
| Source | Rating |
|---|---|
| AllMusic | 3.5/5 stars |

Glasgow Monday is the 47th release, third live album, and second-ever double album release, from avant-folk/blues singer/songwriter Jandek. It is his fifth release of the year (counting the DVD version of Glasgow Sunday) and features "The Corwood Representative" on piano and vocals, along with the same rhythm section he performed with at the shows documented on Glasgow Sunday and Newcastle Sunday, bassist Richard Youngs (playing upright bass) and drummer/percussionist Alex Neilson who accents the music with chimes and echoing percussion.

It was recorded live at the Center for Contemporary Arts in Glasgow, Scotland on May 23, 2005, and features a prelude and nine parts to a single song, "The Cell".

== Track listing ==
=== "The Cell" ===
==== Disc one ====
| No. | Title | Length |
|---|---|---|
| 1. | "Prelude" | 5:12 |
| 2. | "Part One" | 10:26 |
| 3. | "Part Two" | 8:25 |
| 4. | "Part Three" | 11:04 |
| 5. | "Part Four" | 9:15 |
| Total length: | | 44:25 |

==== Disc two ====
| No. | Title | Length |
|---|---|---|
| 1. | "Part Five" | 7:40 |
| 2. | "Part Six" | 6:21 |
| 3. | "Part Seven" | 7:51 |
| 4. | "Part Eight" | 6:29 |
| 5. | "Part Nine" | 12:10 |
| Total length: | | 40:31 |
