= A Band =

British musical collective

The A Band
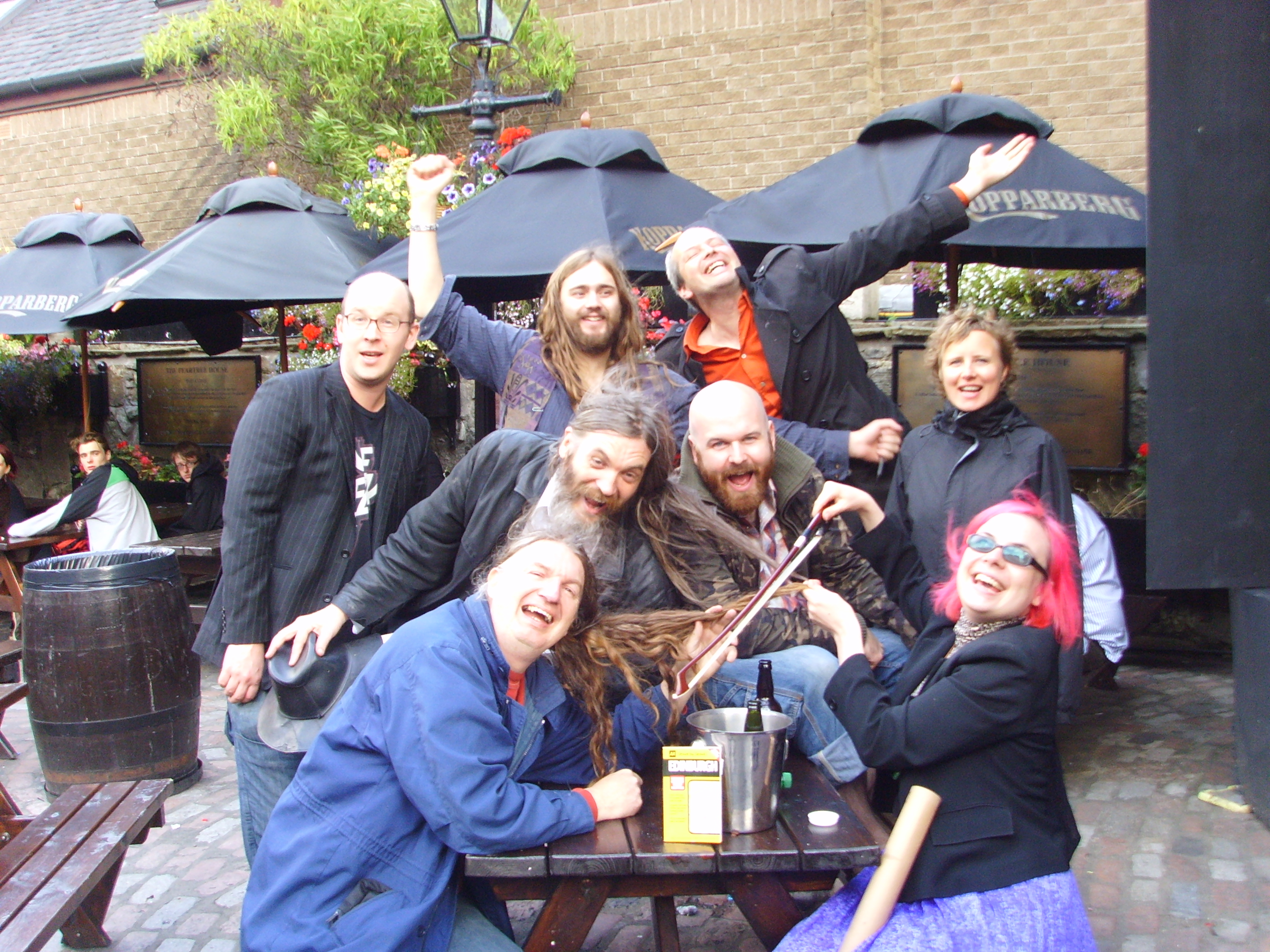
- The A Band at the Edinburgh Fringe Festival, 2009. Back row: Pete Herring, Karl Waugh, Stewart Greenwood. Middle:Stewart Keith, Seth Cooke, Gardyloo SPeW. Front: Andrew Fletcher, Greta Pistaceci.

Background information
- Origin: Nottingham, England
- Genres: Free improvisation
- Years active: 1990–1999; 2007–present
- Members: Stream Angel; Stuart Arnot; Stanley Bad; Martin Bizarro; Andie Brown; Seth Cooke; Gaving Christy; Andrea Fletcher; Andrew Fletcher; Megan Fletcher-Cutts; Pete Herring; Stewart Keith; Simon Morris; Simon Murphy; Richard Thomas; Chloe Wallace; Karl Waugh; Gardyloo SPeW; Calum F Kerr; Jonas Golland; Dolly Dollycore; Emu Extraordinare; Tim Drage "Bonkers" Kev Nickells; Max Leonard Hitchings; David Shewry; Andrew Locke; Marc Vaulbert de Chantilly; Carlos Ferrao; Lara Pearl; Lydia Morgan; Dan Spicer (in denial); Dunrobin Dobbin; Matthew Lee Knowles; Zali Krishna; Megan Alodon; Phillip Raymond Goodman; Tim Flitcroft; Charlie Wheatley; James Wise; Tina Hibbins; Lisa McKendric; James shearman
- Past members: Andy Anderson; John Aziz; Tim Barker; Neil Campbell; Michael Canning; Gavin Christy; Sophie Cooper; Jean-Emmanuel Dubois; Vince Earimal; Sticky Foster; Ginge Attridge; Stewart Greenwood; Dave Higginson; John Hedley; Mick Horton; Billy MacLennan Irvine; Joincey; Julie Kjær; David Large; Dr Neil Lent (a.k.a. Lenty); Niggle; Verity Spott; Rafe Ozimek; Neal Pates; Greta Pistaceci; Jim Plaistow; Barry Rothery; Sarah Attridge; Matt Scott; Isabel Scum-Plotter; Geoffrey Sick; Phil Todd; Richard Thomas; Dave Walters; Simon Wickham-Smith; Michael Gillham; Mike Vest; Murray Ward; Andrew Williams; Richard Youngs

The A Band are a British musical collective formed in Nottingham in the late 1980s. In 2005, The Wire compared the band's importance to that of AMM and SME, and noted their lack of musical training.

The line-up of the group has never been fixed. New members are always invited to join the band.

== History ==
Some of the early A Band members had previously recorded material in the 1980s as Well Crucial, a group scattered across the UK and, in some cases, collaborating by post. A core of members was based in Kettering, Northamptonshire around Neil Campbell, Stewart Keith and Stream Angel, with other contributions by Richard Youngs. However, by 1990 these members had moved to Nottingham and the focus shifted there, with Well Crucial effectively ceasing to be.

The A Band itself was founded at the behest of saxophonist Vince Earimal, who required a backing band, and the unit quickly became an ever-changing, freeform improvisation unit, able to play without Earimal, who, despite eventually never performing with the band, is credited with their formation. Youngs joined upon moving to Nottingham and he recalled in The Wire that Jim Plaistow and Campbell were the only constantly present members. They could number up to 18 on any given occasion. The original collective came to a halt around 1994.

The group never performed under the name A Band or any obvious permutation thereof (they are occasionally listed as The A-Band). Instead, the group used a different name for each performance, all of which began with the letter "a". These included Anusol, Arachnid, Arse-over-tit, Awkward, Anaglypta, Artex, AC/DC, Ack Ack, Anglegrinder and Advent, the latter in commemoration of the then-recently released Richard Youngs LP - in fact, it was at this show that Youngs' spoken word record 171 Used Train Tickets (released 2003) was recorded. However, the releases were almost always credited to "A Band" and these included several cassette releases, an LP on Siltbreeze and a 7" single. Some archive recordings later saw daylight; a CD of recordings from 1991 was issued in 1997 and live activity, also from 1991, was given a vinyl release in 2003, the material being edited by Youngs with artwork from Campbell and Plaistow. Much of the interest in the band that followed the initial releases came more from the United States than Great Britain, but this was insufficient to keep the band going, and the various members pursued music in smaller groups, or solo.

=== Reformation ===
In April 2007 the A Band remorphed, and performed at the 4th Festival Of Improvised Music at the Pyramid in Warrington, which took place on 16 June. Billed as "Afterclap", the line up included Stewart Keith, Neil Campbell, Dr Lent, Dave Higginson (of "Who is Dave Higginson?" fame), Stocky Fister, Gardyloo SPeW, Jon Lander, Andrea Fletcher, Megan Fletcher-Cutts, Stanley Bad, Pascal Nichols and Joincey.

The next performance, as "American Evil" (an anagram of "Vince Earimal"), was on 19 August in Shoreditch, London. On this occasion Stewart Keith and Gardyloo SPeW were joined by new A Banders John Aziz, Martin Bizarro, Zoe Darling, Philip Julian, Simon Murphy, Phil Todd (of Ashtray Navigations) and Karl Waugh.

Since this they have performed over 150 times across the UK, and recruited more than 80 new members, including Richard Forrester, Richard Spencer, Richard Attridge, and two Richard Thomases.

In April 2011, Gardyloo SPeW convened an A Band performance for the first time in Sydney, Australia. The lineup consisted of Gardyloo SPeW on sax, vocals and theremin with a cast of local musicians from the city's experimental hub The Bird's Robe Collective.

A film documenting the genesis and growth of the A Band was filmed by Tim Barker in 2006, but has yet to be edited. A second film documenting the band's current activities is being planned.

== Discography ==
This listing may be incomplete - there are probably other releases extant.

- Anusol - cassette (self-released, a compilation of the earliest live recordings, given away at the Anusol performance, limited to 10 copies, 1990).
- Untitled - 7" single (Any Old Records, recorded and released 1991)
- Anusol - cassette (Chocolate Monk recorded 1990, released 1992 - this is a recording of the performance listed above rather than a reissue of the previous tape)
- Zene/Salivating Regina 7" (Baby Huey BABY-007, US, 1992)
- Artex / A Lot - LP (Siltbreeze SB018 LP, US, 1993, rec. 1990 and 1991)
- April Twelfth Nineteen-NinetyTwo cassette of studio recordings (self-released, recorded on the titular date)
- Alarms - C46 cassette (self-released, 1993)
- Live @ 7th Annual Neil Young Convention - cassette (Union Pole, c.1996, recorded July 1994)
- A Band - CD (self-released, issued by Plaistow and Campbell, recorded 1991, released 1997)
- Live In Greece 1992 - cassette (Kyp Highbury Records, recorded 1992, released 1999)
- A Band - LP (Qbico 12, LP, Italy, 2003, rec. 1991)
- TV Set From Winter - CDR (Qbico, recorded 1991, issued 2003, only available with the first 26 copies of the above LP on the same label)
- Afterclap - DVD (Any Old Records 2008)
- Avacado - CDR (Partially Sane Records 2009 - limited edition of 50)
- An Ole Crab/ Andrew Lloyd Webber - Double CD (Live from 1993 - Apollolaan Records 2009)
- Autograph - CDR (Partially Sane Records 2009 - limited edition of 50)
- Amphibian - CDR (Bug Incision (Canada) 2010, studio sessions from 2009, edition of 119 - www.bugincision.com)
- Abstruse - 3" (Sonic Oyster Records (Scotland) 2011 from a 2010 live recording)
- 20 Greatest Hits Volume One - The 90s - double CD (Must Die records 2012)
- Away In A Manger - CDR (Any Old Records 2013, Christmas album limited to 50 copies)
- Aurora (A Very A Band Xmas 2015 Triple Album) - digital release (Bandcamp, recorded at New River Studio on 8 October 2015, featuring Phillip Raymond Goodman, Stewart Keith, Tiger Gnome, Stanley Bad, Zoe Plumb, Steve PAsTA, Lara Pearl, Tim Drage, and Zali phoning in his appearance; resulted in well over four hours of recording, released 23 December 2015).
- Adlawng Natawhan (Merry Keithmas) - digital release (Bandcamp, composed of the non-Christmas tracks from the 'Aurora (A Very A Band Xmas 2015 Triple Album)' session, released 8 October 2016).

Compilations, etc.:

- Vince Taylor Is Dead - on compilation CD Church Of The Subgenius (recorded 1991, released 1992)
- Martian Love Call - on compilation CD The Arbitrary Nature Of Meaning, credit reads Simon Wickham-Smith & A Band (Isomorphic, 1994)
- aaaaaaaaaaaaaaaaaaaaaaaaaaaaaaa... (exclusive Wire unraveling tape edit) - on compilation CD Tapper 23 (The Wire 2010, limited edition of 20,000 copies)
- TV Sets From Winter - on compilation CD (Must Die Records 2012)

DVD sets:

- Archive - 6 disc set compiled by Klair Films & documenting 17 live sets and 2 studio sessions from 1991 to 2010 (Any Old Records 2010)
- A Bit Partial - 2 DVDs, 2 CDRs, and 2 cassettes documenting 13 live sets and 2 studio sessions from 2010 to 2014 (Any Old Records 2014)
