= Khartoum (disambiguation) =

Khartoum is the capital city of Sudan.

Khartoum may also refer to:

- Khartoum State, Sudan
- Khartoum North (al-Khartūm Bahrī), a city close to, but distinct from, Khartoum in central Sudan
- The Siege of Khartoum, a battle between Egyptian and Sudanese forces in 1885
- Khartum, a ghost town along Highway 41 in Greater Madawaska, Ontario, Canada
- Khartoum Resolution of September 1, 1967, formed the basis of Arab policy toward Israel and in which the Arab states declared: "No peace with Israel, no recognition of Israel, no negotiations with Israel"
- Khartoum League, a historical football championship in Sudan
- Khartoum gerbil Dipodillus stigmonyx, a gerbil found mainly in Sudan

== Arts and entertainment ==
- Khartoum (album) and Khartoum Variations, albums by Texan musician Jandek
- A Disney's Aladdin character
- Name of the champion racehorse owned by Jack Woltz in The Godfather
- Khartoum (1966 film), a British epic war film
- Khartoum (2025 film), a documentary film
