= What Else Does the Time Mean? =

What Else Does The Time Mean?

Studio album by Jandek
- Released: April 2006
- Recorded: 2006
- Length: 60:14
- Label: Corwood Industries
- Producer: Corwood Industries

Jandek chronology
Newcastle Sunday (2006)	What Else Does The Time Mean? (2006)	Glasgow Monday (2006)

Professional ratings
Review scores
Source	Rating
AllMusic	3/5 stars
PopMatters	6/10 stars

What Else Does The Time Mean? is the 46th album from avant- folk/blues singer-songwriter Jandek. It was released by Corwood Industries (#0784). It is his third release in 2006, following January's' Khartoum Variations and February's live double-album Newcastle Sunday.

== Track listing ==
No.	Title	Length
1.	"My Own Way"	16:34
2.	"Walk Over"	5:00
3.	"Japanese Cup"	7:24
4.	"Walls Down"	5:27
5.	"The Place"	6:36
6.	"I've Been a Body"	7:16
7.	"I'm Sorry No"	8:01
8.	"If I Waited Twenty Hours"	3:56
Total length:		60:14
