= The One Ensemble of Daniel Padden =

The One Ensemble is a British musical group, based in Glasgow. The project was initially conceived by Volcano The Bear member Daniel Padden as a vehicle for his solo work, and their first three albums were released under the name The One Ensemble Of Daniel Padden. Two studio albums in this mould were released, an eponymous debut on the Catsup Plate label in 2003 and The Owl Of Fives on Textile Records in 2004. Although mostly recorded by Padden on his own, these albums featured contributions from other musicians including Jeremy Barnes, Alex Neilson and David Keenan.

After this, the project expanded to a quintet featuring Aby Vulliamy, Peter Nicholson, Chris Hladowski and Alex Neilson. This line-up was documented on the Live at VPRO Radio album released by Brainwashed Recordings in 2004. In 2005, Neilson left, and the group's name was changed to "The One Ensemble" with Padden now releasing his solo work under his given name. Their fourth album Wayward The Fourth has been released by the label, Secret Eye in January 2007.

In 2009, The One Ensemble composed and released music alongside Sarah Kenchington for Matt Hulse's feature film.

The current quartet is Shane Connolly (drums and percussion) [Tattie Toes], Peter Nicholson (cello, voice), Daniel Padden (guitar, piano, voice etc.) [Volcano The Bear] and Aby Vulliamy (viola, accordion, voice) [Nalle].
