= Volcano the Bear =

English musical act

- Origin: Leicester, England
- Genres: Experimental/improvised
- Years active: 1996–present
- Labels: Volucan, Pickled Egg Records, Misra, Beta-lactam Ring Records, United Dairies, Rune Grammofon
- Website: brainwashed.com/vtb/

Volcano the Bear are an improvisational/experimental English band formed in Leicester in 1995. The group's members are Aaron Moore (drums, trumpet, vocals), Nick Mott (saxophone, guitar, vocals), Clarence Manuelo (tapes, electronics) and Daniel Padden (keyboards, guitar, clarinet, vocals). Although the principal roles of each member are as listed, the group use a large array of additional sound-making objects to create their music.

== Early work ==
Their early work was characterised by theatrical live performances and unconventional recording methods; for example The One Burned Ma, their second full-length album, contains no tracks on which all four members appear. Having self-released a handful of cassettes and CD-Rs, several as every short-run limited editions with hand-drawn inserts, they came to the attention of Steven Stapleton of Nurse With Wound, who revived his United Dairies imprint to release The Inhazer Decline, their first full-length album. However, a proposed collaboration with Nurse With Wound was not completed. They continued to release regular live CDRs on their own Volucan imprint, and later albums such as Five Hundred Boy Piano and much of The Idea of Wood were performed live in the studio.

== Hiatus ==
A hiatus in group activity occurred in the early part of the 2000s with Mott and Moore reviving their pre-Volcano the Bear unit Songs of Norway. Manuelo created an album and EP as Earthtrumpet. Padden founded The One Ensemble of Daniel Padden initially as a solo project, later expanded to a quartet, with Chris Hladowski and Aby Vulliamy (both of Nalle), and Peter Nicholson. This unit has subsequently issued its releases as "The One Ensemble", with Padden releasing an album in 2006 of his solo material under his own name. Padden has also played with the Glasgow Improvisers Orchestra.

Moore played drums on the 1999 L.P. Free Surf Music #1 by Alan Jenkins and The Thurston Lava Tube, drummed for The Nightingales for a while, and in 2005 formed the duo Dragon or Emperor with occasional VtB collaborator Stewart Brackley. He also released a solo album The Accidental on which Alex Neilson and Andrew Liles appear. He is currently a member of the Brooklyn band Freetime.

== Reunification ==
In early 2006 the band reconvened to release a double album Classic Erasmus Fusion to excellent reviews, and later that year released a live recording of their first performance as a full band in four years entitled Egg and Two Books.

The band released their first album for five years, Golden Rhythm / Ink Music, in April 2012.

== Musical style ==
The band's music has been described as "avant-garde drone rock", "avant rock", and on the album 500 Boy Piano British folk influences were noted. Their 2012 album Golden Rhythm / Ink Music was described as pushing "well beyond the boundaries of rock music, incorporating elements of Middle Eastern music, American freak folk, jazz, and Dadaist literary absurdity". They have been compared with The Residents, Nurse With Wound, and Faust among others.

== Discography ==
Year	Title	Format	Label/Cat. No.	Notes
Volcano The Bear
1996	Vol One	Cassette	Volucan 001	Limited edition of 25.
1996	Vol Tu	Cassette	Volucan 002	Limited edition of 50.
1996	Vol III (iii)	Cassette	Volucan 003	Limited edition of 20.
1998	Volfur	CD-R/CD	Volucan 004, later Beta-lactam Ring mt053.1	Limited edition of '50 – 60'. Recorded live 6 February 1998.
1998	Volve	CD-R/CD	Volucan 005, later Beta-Lactam Ring mt053.2	Signed limited edition of 50. Recorded live 22 March 1998.
1998	The Inhazer Decline	CD-R	Volucan 006	Limited edition of 6.
1998	Volseptor	CD-R/CD	Volucan 007, later Beta-Lactam Ring mt053.3	
1999	Volwheat	CD-R	Volucan 008	Recorded live 8 March 1999 at the Y Theatre in Leicester.
1999	Yak Folk's Y'are	LP	Pickled Egg 7	
2000	The Inhazer Decline	CD	United Dairies UD055	Fewer tracks than 1998 version.
2000	The One Burned Ma	CD	Misra MSR006	
2001	Five Hundred Boy Piano	CD	United Dairies UD50	
2002	Guess The Birds	10" EP	Beta-Lactam Ring mt028	
2002	Volnono	CD-R/CD	Volucan 009, later Beta-Lactam Ring mt0 53.4	Some tracks previously featured on Volwheat.
2002	Xvol	CD-R/CD	Volucan 010, later Beta-Lactam Ring mt053.5	Live in East Hampton, Massachusetts.
2002	The Mountains Among Us	LP/CD-R	Beta-Lactam Ring mt045/Volucan 011	
2002	Voleven	CD-R	Volucan 011	Only available with the Volucan edition of "The Mountains Among Us", features material by VTB and various other projects.
2003	The Idea of Wood	CD/LP	Textile Records TCD3/TLP3	
2004	All The Paint I Can Breathe	10"EP	Beta-Lactam Ring mt059	Material from the first three Cassettes. Some with additional 7".
2004	Voldozer	CD-R	Volucan 012	Recorded live in Glasgow, Paris and Nijmegen
2004	"Shake Your Crow Remix" / "Tunnels And Wheels"	7"	Gold Soundz GS#13	Limited edition of 310.
2005	Catonapotato	CD	Broken Face/Digitalis Industries DIGI14	Recorded live in Leicester, Sheffield, Paris and Norrköping. Only Mott & Moore appear.
2006	Classic Eramus Fusion	2xLP/2xCD	Beta-Lactam Ring mt092a/b	Some 2xLP sets come with an extra 7", and a special edition comes with a bonus LP and the 7".
2006	Volfurten	LP	Volucan 014	Limited edition of 300 with hand-painted covers.
2006	"Massive Furniture Invasion"	8"	alt.vinyl	Limited edition of 150.
2006	"Birth of Streissand"	7"	NO-FI NEU001	Limited edition of 150.
2006	Egg And Two Books	CD	Vivo 2006026CD	Recorded live at the Phoenix Theatre, Leicester.
2007	Amidst the Noise and Twigs	CD	Beta-Lactam Ring mt204a	
2007	Volquince	CD-R	Volucan 015	
2007	11 Years of Yes	CD-R Business Card	Twisted Knister Flupp 025	One track, limited edition of 40 copies in cigarette packet.
2009	The Shy Volcanic Society at the Bear And Bird Parade	CD	Beta-Lactam Ring mt222	Split release with La Societe Des Timides A La Parades Des Oiseaux.
2009	That People Don't Know They Are Monsters / Bow Heavier My Lord	7"	Quasi Pop QPOP REC 02	
2010	Volrudolf / Grande Pfungst	LP / CDR	Volfurten 01	Limited edition of 105 copies with hand-painted covers.
2010	Volsechzehn	CDR	Volucan 016	Recorded live in Berlin, 2009 . Only Moore and Padden appear.
2010	Planetary Bethlehem	LP	Beta-Lactam Ring mt205	Limited to 330 copies. 30 in hand-painted covers.
2011	Hotbites Live at the Nightlight	LP	Blastocoel Sound 002	Limited to 100 copies. Live in Chapel Hill, NC, 2006.
2012	Golden Rhythm / Ink Music	LP/CD	Rune Grammofon	
Other Projects
The One Ensemble of Daniel Padden (Solo and group works by Daniel Padden.)
2002	The One Ensemble of Daniel Padden	CD	Catsup Plate CPR714	
2003	The Owl of Fives	LP/CD	Textile TLP4/TCD4	
2005	Live at VPRO Radio	CD-R	Brainwashed Handmade Series HAND002	
2006	The Isaac Storm	LP	Ultra Eczema UE37	As "Daniel Padden". Limited edition of 400.
2007	Wayward The Fourth	CD	Secret Eye No. 32	As "The One Ensemble".
Songs of Norway (Improvised music by Aaron Moore and Nick Mott.)
2003	Despite The Cloak	LP/CD	Beta-Lactam Ring mt058	Some LPs with additional 7".
2004	The Great Work	3" CD	Olwyn Plant SB007	
Earth Trumpet (Solo work by Clarence Manuelo.)
2000	Earth Trumpet	CD	Cenotaph Audio CT004	
2001	Roman	2xCD-R	Beta-Lactam Ring mt053.6	One audio disc, one with QuickTime movie.
Guignol (Aaron Moore, Jeremy Barnes and Clarence Manuelo.)
2003	Angela, David and the Great Neopolitan Road Issue	CD	Cenotaph Audio CT009	
El Monte Aranos (Nick Mott and Aranos.)
2003	Allied Cooking But Not As You Know It!	CD	Pieros 003CD	
Aaron Moore (Solo project.)
2005	The Accidental	CD	Elsie & Jack No. 017	Some with additional DVD by Francesco Paladino with extra track.
Dragon or Emperor (Aaron Moore and Stewart Brackley.)
2007	Dragon or Emperor	LP/CD	Pickled Egg 64CD	

=== Compilation appearances ===
- Lactamase Bonus Compilation
