= Secret Life of Machines (album) =

Studio album by Doldrums
- Released: October 31, 1995
- Recorded: 1994 – 1995
- Genres: Post-rock, space rock
- Length: 52:01
- Label: VHF

Doldrums chronology
Secret Life of Machines (1995)	Acupuncture (1997)

Professional ratings
Review scores
Source	Rating
Allmusic	4.5/5 stars

Secret Life of Machines is the debut studio album by the rock band Doldrums, released on October 31, 1995 by VHF Records.

== Track listing ==
All music is composed by Doldrums.

No.	Title	Length
1.	"Weird Orbits"	9:55
2.	"Colossal Scissors"	15:35
3.	"Prog Epilogue"	6:04
4.	"Knife, Spoon, Zug"	4:47
5.	"HTMLosers"	15:40

== Personnel ==
Adapted from Secret Life of Machines liner notes.

Doldrums

- Justin Chearno – guitar, recording
- Bill Kellum – bass guitar, recording
- Matt Kellum – drums, recording

Additional musicians

- Andrew Giles – guitar (5)

Production and additional personnel

- Vicki Ellison – photography

== Release history ==
Region	Date	Label	Format	Catalog
United States	1995	VHF	CD, LP	VHF#21
