= Freedom From =

American record label

- Founded: 1996
- Founder: Matthew St-Germaine
- Genre: Noise
- Country of origin: U.S.
- Location: Minneapolis, Minnesota

Freedom From is a record label based in Minneapolis, Minnesota, which primarily focuses on the international noise underground genre. The label was founded in 1996 with its first official release by a San Francisco three-piece named Job. Up until early 1998, the labels focus was singularly cassettes, with the most well-known being the infamous Thurston Moore/Beck/Tom Surgal cassette.

During the course of its primary existence, FF often released either the first or first widely available release by many bands, including Jason Lescalleet, Hair Police, Sightings, No Doctors, Milovan Srdenovic, Violent Ramp, Reynols and many more. Freedom From was also one of the first entities to book and promote shows nationally for experimental/weird bands from 2001 to 2004, including the first major tours for bands like Wolf Eyes, Sightings, No Doctors, Hair Police, Mammal, Nautical Almanac and more. Freedom From also helped bring to prominence the last years of the infamous Church venue in Minneapolis, bringing bands like Animal Collective, Coachwhips, Wolf Eyes, Numbers, 25 Suaves, Glass Candy, Chromatics and many more for their first ever shows in the Twin Cities area.

Finally, Freedom From is also known for the De Stijl/Freedom From and End Times Festivals, bringing in artists like Tony Conrad, The Boredoms, XBXRX, NNCK, Gang Gang Dance, Zip Code Rapists, Borbetomags, Smegma, Burning Star Core, Devendra Banhart, Arthur Doyle and many more.

Since 2006, the label has released very few releases, and has booked even fewer shows. However, 2012 has seen a significant increase in FF activities, and a bevy of new releases and shows are due for release in October, 2012. The label is maintained to this day by founder and CEO Matthew St-Germaine.

== Artists ==
- Jackie O Motherfucker
- Zip Code Rapists
- Cock ESP
- Reynols
- Birchville Cat Motel
- No Doctors
- Sightings
- Hair Police
- Ashtray Navigations
- Vibracathedral Orchestra
- Lasse Marhaug
- Kevin Drumm
- Violent Ramp
- Pimmon
- Mason Jones
- Noxagt
- Hiatus
- Bad Sector
- Prick Decay
- Alan Licht
- Thurston Moore
- Beck
- Tom Surgal
- Greg Kelley
- Crank Sturgeon
- Neil Campbell
- Witcyst
- Smell & Quim
- Harry Pussy
- Evil Moisture
- La Gloria
- Brutum Fulmen

== See also ==
- List of record labels
