= Feng shui (disambiguation) =

Feng shui is the ancient Chinese practice of placement and arrangement of space to achieve harmony with the environment.

Feng shui may also refer to:

- Feng Shui (role-playing game), an action movie role-playing game
- Feng Shui (2004 film), a Filipino supernatural horror film
  - Feng Shui 2, a 2014 Filipino film and the sequel of the 2004 film
- Feng Shui (2012 film), a Chinese film
- Fengshui (2018 film), a South Korean period film
- "Feng Shui", a song on the Gnarls Barkley album St. Elsewhere
- "Boogie Woogie Feng Shui", episode 21 of Cowboy Bebop (anime)
- Heap feng shui, a technique for manipulating a computer's storage heap
- Feng Shui (album), a 2000 album by Doldrums
