= Hair Police =

American rock band

- Origin: Lexington, Kentucky, U.S.
- Genres: Industrial, noise, experimental
- Years active: 2001–present
- Labels: Troubleman Unlimited; Hanson Records; Gods of Tundra; Freedom From
- Members: Robert Beatty; Trevor Tremaine; Mike Connelly
- Past members: Ross Compton; Matt Minter
- Website: http://www.gnarlytimes.com

Hair Police is an American rock band based out of Lexington, Kentucky, that formed in 2001. They have released records through labels such as Troubleman Unlimited, Hanson Records, Gods of Tundra, Freedom From, and Hospital Productions. They have also released a split record on Load Records with Viki. Members of Hair Police have also played with other groups such as Wolf Eyes, Eyes and Arms of Smoke, Burning Star Core, Three Legged Race, Von Hemmling, Ulysses, Warmer Milks, and ATTEMPT.

== History ==
Hair Police formed in January 2001 in Lexington, Kentucky. The original line up was Robert Beatty, Ross Compton, Mike Connelly, Matt Minter, and Trevor Tremaine. The band released the History of Ghost Dad cassette to coincide with its first live show on April 13, 2001. Compton stopped playing with the band in the summer of 2001. Minter left the band in October 2002. Connelly moved to Michigan at the end of 2003 and joined Wolf Eyes in the spring of 2005.

The band has toured extensively in the U.S. with Wolf Eyes, Prurient, Kites, Graveyards, Heathen Shame, No Doctors, Nautical Almanac, Sightings, Mammal, Neon Hunk, and most notably with Sonic Youth in August 2004.

== Discography ==
=== 2001 ===
- History of Ghost Dad CS/CDR (#1 New Gods of Tundra GOT004)

=== 2002 ===
- V/A Know Your Own Vol. 1 CDR (Lexington Action Arts Collective)
- V/A Fog People Vol. 1 CS (Animal Disguise ADR014)
- Blow Out Your Blood CD (Freedom From FF0172)

=== 2003 ===
- Mortuary Servants 7" (Gods of Tundra GOT040/ Freedom From FF0204)
- Movies- Live '01-'02 CS (Animal Disguise ADR033)
- S/T CS (Hospital Productions HOS-85)
- Live at the Empty Bottle July 4, 2002 VHS (Dronedsico fig. 50/ Gods of Tundra GOT046/ Freedom From FF0220)
- V/A Closet Full of Clothes LP (White Denim No. 4)
- Hair Police/Viki split CD (Load Records LOAD047)
- Hair Police/Viki split LP (Scratch and Sniff Entertainment SNSE030)
- Hair Police/Cadaver in Drag split CS (Husk Records HUSK No. 10)
- Probe Cutting CS (Gods of Tundra GOT052)

=== 2004 ===
- Rattlers Echo 3" CDR (Chondritic Sound CH-44)
- Obedience Cuts LP (Gods of Tundra GOT055)
- Obedience Cuts CD (Freedom From FF0250)
- Gnarly Times lathe 6" (Gutter Lathe Society GLS-06)
- V/A Secrets and Sounds CD (Animal Disguise ADR025)
- Your Skull in the Gutter CS (Gods of Tundra GOT060)
- Hair Police/Crystal Fantasy 10" (LDR/HPR)
- Dune Sores CS (Rampart RAM005)
- Leech Pit CS (Gods of Tundra GOT064)
- V/A Airwaves for Your Hairwaves: Live from WNUR (WNUR, Northwestern University)

=== 2005 ===
- Hair Police/Dead Machines split LP (Gods of Tundra/American Tapes)
- Drawn Dead CD (Hanson HN124)
- Hair Police CD (Hospital Productions HOS-85a)
- 030505 CS (Mountaain DOOR002)
- Dead Machines/Hair Police- Illegal the Raw CS (Fag Tapes FT019)
- Constantly Terrified CD/LP (Troubleman Unlimited TMU148)
- Live!!! split w/ Wolf Eyes CS (Purple Stuff)

=== 2006 ===
- Prescribed Burning CDR (Gods of Tundra)
- V/A Sonic Protest 2006 (Sonic Protest)
- untitled CS/CDR (Gods of Tundra)
- Live in Lexington CDR (American Tapes)
- Drawn Dead LP (Weird Forest)
- Prescribed Burning LP (Hospital Productions)
- Strict 7" (Troubleman Unlimited)
- Hair Police/Pengo LP (Gods of Tundra)

=== 2007 ===
- Blind Kingdom LP (Ultra Eczema)
- Fear of Sleep CS (Hospital Productions)
- The Empty Quarter CD (Harbinger Sound)

=== 2008 ===
- Certainty of Swarms CD/LP (No Fun Productions)

=== 2013 ===
- "Mercurial Rights" LP (Type Recordings)
