= National park (disambiguation) =

A national park is a reserve of land.

National park or national parks may also refer to:

== Places ==
=== Parks and protected areas ===
- List of national parks
- National Park Service, manages all U.S. national parks

=== Municipalities ===
- National Park, New Jersey, a borough in Gloucester County, New Jersey
- National Park, New Zealand, a small town on the North Island Central Plateau in New Zealand, also known as National Park Village
- National Park, Tasmania, a locality

== Arts, entertainment, and media ==
=== Bands ===
- National Park (band), a music group from Glasgow, Scotland
- The National Parks (band), American band

=== Films ===
- The National Parks: America's Best Idea (2009), a documentary by filmmaker Ken Burns

== Other uses ==
- Nationals Park, the Washington Nationals' baseball field

== See also ==
- Boundary Field, Washington, D.C. (alternative name for National Park, also known as American League Park II)
- Griffith Stadium, Washington, D.C. (former sports stadium built on the site of National Park)
