= Doldrums (band) =

American post-rock band

- Origin: Fairfax, Virginia, United States
- Genres: Post-rock, space rock
- Years active: 1994–2000
- Labels: Kranky, VHF
- Past members: Justin Chearno; Bill Kellum; Matt Kellum

Doldrums was an American post-rock band formed in Fairfax, Virginia, United States, in 1994. The group consisted of guitarist Justin Chearno, bassist Bill Kellum, and drummer Matt Kellum. Most of the band's music was improvised, with little or no overdubs. Bill Kellum cited psychedelic music and krautrock as influences. The band never toured and has not released an album since 2000's Feng Shui.

== Discography ==
- Secret Life of Machines (1995, VHF)
- Acupuncture (1997, Kranky)
- Feng Shui (1998, VHF)
- Desk Trickery (1999, Kranky)
