= Wingtip Sloat =

American rock trio

- Origin: Virginia
- Genres: Indie rock Experimental rock Lo-fi; Post-hardcore
- Years active: 1990 – 1998; 2013 – present
- Labels: Sweet Portable Junket; VHF
- Members: Patrick Foster; Andy Dubuc; David Bishop
- Past members: Brad Maylor

Wingtip Sloat (often nicknamed to just Sloat) is an indie rock trio formed in the Washington, D.C., suburb Falls Church, Virginia. Active throughout the 1990s, the group comprised Patrick Foster on guitar and vocals, Andy Dubuc on bass, and David Bishop on drums. Throughout their initial decade of activity, the group remained committedly DIY, recording and publishing their music themselves while holding down full-time jobs, earning Wingtip Sloat repute as "hardest working band in America."

== History ==
Starting in 1985 guitarists Patrick Foster and Brad Maylor, along with bass player Andy Duboc, were part of the collegiate indie rock band Empty Box in Charlottesville, Virginia. Before Empty Box disbanded in 1989, David Bishop had joined on drums and the four musicians went on to reconstruct the group in 1990 under the name Wingtip Sloat. By 1991 Maylor had left the band, and Sloat continued on as a trio, practicing in the basement of Duboc's parents' house and recording sessions on 4-track tape. They released several rough recordings on cassette, and then some more refined material on 7-inch vinyl via their own label, Sweet Portable Junket, derived from their similarly named fanzine, Sweet Portable You. The group went to great lengths to print and collate their records in uniquely handmade wrappers, rounding out a staunch do-it-yourself aesthetic for the band. The group's early sound was reminiscent of other DC-area post-hardcore artists affiliated with Dischord Records, but Wingtip's Sloat's lo-fi sound and penchant for New Zealand pop set them apart.

Wingtip Sloat's heavy airplay on college radio and occasional tours along the East Coast, sometimes as openers for acts like Pavement, Thinking Fellers Union Local 282 and Sebadoh, created a buzz in the American indie rock scene. They were also a favorite of British DJ John Peel who played them a lot on BBC Radio and raved about the group to Rolling Stone magazine. The group contributed tracks to several compilations, released split records with like-minded bands, and were known for covering songs by seminal, contemporary, and often obscure indie artists who'd influenced their sound: Swell Maps, Tall Dwarfs, The Clean, Sun City Girls, Happy Go Licky, World of Pooh, Galaxie 500, Minutemen, and others.

Much of Sloat's material was released by Rake bassist Bill Kellum's DC-area label VHF Records, including two LPs of more polished-sounding material: 1995's Chewyfoot and 1998's If Only for the Hatchery. Though the band's progress was sometimes slowed by the members' work in their various fields of printing, contracting, and accounting, they continued to practice several times a week. Following prominent concerts in the late 1990s with Sonic Youth, Spoon, and Mike Watt, Wingtip Sloat's members shifted their priorities to family life, and the group disappeared from the public eye.

Wingtip Sloat's early vinyl releases and many compilation tracks resurfaced on the CD collection, Add This to the Rhetoric, in 2007. Meanwhile the band continued to write and record material, even after Bishop's relocation to Louisville, Kentucky in 2004. Recordings from 2015–2016 would surface as the albums Purge and Swell and Lost Decade in 2018. Released as a combined LP-and-CD release, as well as via the online indie music streaming service Bandcamp, these first new Wingtip Sloat tracks to appear in 20 years contained rehearsal tapes, bits of poetry, instrumental breaks, and original songs alongside cover versions of compositions by Belle & Sebastian, Bob Dylan, Brian Eno, and Wire.

== Discography ==
=== Albums ===
- Chewyfoot LP/CD (VHF Records'Tupelo Recording Company, 1995)
- If Only For The Hatchery LP/CD (VHF Records, 1998)
- Purge and Swell LP (VHF Records, 2018)
- Lost Decade CD (VHF Records, 2018)

=== Extended plays ===
- "M31" 7-inch EP (Sweet Portable Junket, 1991)
- Half Past I've Got 2×7″ EP (VHF Records/Sweet Portable Junket, 1992)
- "Return Of The Night Of The Ardent Straggler" 7-inch EP (VHF Records, 1994)

=== Split records ===
- "Read About Seymour"/"Vertical Slum" split single with Rake covering Swell Maps (VHF Records, 1995)
- Split EP with Mote (Toothpick Records, 1996)
- Split EP with Trans Am (Tuba Frenzy, 1996)

=== Cassettes ===
- As Though I was Waiting for That (Sweet Portable Junket, 1990)
- User-Friendly Bowl Wrapper (Sweet Portable Junket, 1991)
- Santa On The Crappa (Sweet Portable Junket, 1995)

=== Compilations ===
- Add This To Rhetoric CD comprising tracks from singles, EPs, cassettes, and compilations (Revolver Records, 2007)
- Purge and Swell/Lost Decade digital download (VHF Records, 2018)
