= Alex Neilson =

British musician (born 1982)

Alex Neilson (born 22 September 1982) is an English drummer, percussionist and singer who is based in Glasgow but grew up in Leeds. He is a founding member and main songwriter of folk-rock group Trembling Bells (2008-2018). He is also known for his continuing collaborations with Alasdair Roberts, Will Oldham and Richard Youngs, and for his work with elusive American singer/songwriter Jandek.

== Career ==
Over the years Neilson has performed alongside a large number of bands and artists including Lucky Luke, The One Ensemble of Daniel Padden, Ashtray Navigations, Alastair Galbraith, Isobel Campbell, Ben Reynolds, Matt Valentine, Tanakh, Josephine Foster, Six Organs of Admittance and Taurpis Tula, as well as Directing Hand and Scatter, both of which he founded. Collaborating with other musicians, he has accompanied on tour several folk artists who have enjoyed a late rediscovery of their work, amongst them Scott Fagan, Nick Garrie, Mike Heron and Shirley Collins. He also drummed on Collins's 2016 comeback album, Lodestar.

In early 2007, Neilson left his position at Glasgow-based record shop and distribution company Volcanic Tongue and joined Will Oldham for tour dates, having first played with him on a Scottish tour in April 2006. Neilson subsequently spending much of the year touring with Ben Reynolds (as Motor Ghost), with David Keenan (as Tight Meat) and with a fresh incarnation of Directing Hand consisting of himself and vocalist/harpist Lavinia Blackwall. In 2008, he toured with Baby Dee - he is heard on Dee's Safe Inside The Day record - and Current 93, having already appeared on a handful of Current 93 releases. A new Oldham live album featuring Neilson was also released.

Neilson spent much of late 2008 and early 2009 concentrating on his band Trembling Bells. The band consisted of Neilson on drums and vocals, Lavinia Blackwall on lead vocals and guitar, Mike Hastings on guitar and Simon Shaw on bass. Their debut LP Carbeth was released on Honest Jon Records to widespread critical acclaim in the spring of 2009. Neilson also spent considerable time on tour with Ben Chasny and his Six Organs of Admittance live ensemble. Trembling Bells continued to tour and release records until their split in late 2018. Their final release, for the 2019 Record Store Day, is a split 10" with Neilson's solo project Alex Rex.

Neilson regularly drummed for American avant-garde musician Jandek. Four of these live performances have been released by Corwood Industries as Glasgow Sunday, Newcastle Sunday, Glasgow Monday and Glasgow Friday on both CD and DVD. He continues to drum for Will Oldham (Bonnie "Prince" Billy), and has recorded and performed extensively with Scottish folk musician Alasdair Roberts on multiple tours and records.

In early 2013, Neilson joined forces with artist Lucy Stein and artist/writer/musician Sybren Renema in Death Shanties, a saxophone-drum duo with live visuals. Their mini-tour and self-released CD-R were generally well received.

Neilson currently releases solo work under the name Alex Rex. His debut album, Vermillion, came out in April 2017 on Tin Angel Records.

The second Alex Rex album Otterburn was released in March 2019. It heavily dealt with the sudden death of Alex's younger brother Alastair around the time of the release of Vermillion. The album cover features a childhood photo of Alastair, Alex and their older brother Oliver. Two singles preceded the album, "Master" and "Latest Regret". Alex Rex's third solo album, Andromeda, was released just a short time afterwards, in 2020, with Paradise following in 2021 on London-based Neolithic Recordings.

In 2022 Alex Rex released Mouthful of Earth, a collection of his poetry and music, on Neolithic Recordings.

== Select discography ==
Solo (Alex Rex)

- Vermillion, CD/LP (Tin Angel Records, 2017)
- Otterburn, LP (Tin Angel Records, 2019)
- Andromeda, CD/LP (Tin Angel Records, 2020)
- Paradise, CD/LP (Neolithic Recordings, 2021)
- Mouthful of Earth, LP (Neolithic Recordings, 2022)

Trembling Bells

- Carbeth, CD (Honest Jon's Records, 2009)
- Abandoned Love, CD (Honest Jon's Records, 2010)
- The Constant Pageant, CD/LP (Honest Jon's Records, 2011)
- The Marble Downs with Bonnie Prince Billy, CD/LP (Honest Jon's Records, 2012)
- The Sovereign Self, CD/LP (Tin Angel Records, 2015)
- Wide Majestic Aire, CD/LP EP (Tin Angel Records, 2016)
- Dungeness, CD/LP (Tin Angel Records, 2018)
- I am the King with Alex Rex, 10" LP (Tin Angel Records, Record Store Day 2019)

Ashtray Navigations

- The Love That Whirrs, CD (Last Visible Dog, 2005)
- To Get Beyond Nihilism By Revaluing Combat, CD-R (Hypnagogia, 2005)

Current 93

- Birth Canal Blues Live, CD (Coptic Cat, 2008)
- Aleph at Hallucinatory Mountain, CD/LP (Coptic Cat, 2009)
- Monohallucinatory Mountain, CD/LP (Coptic Cat, 2009)
- Aleph on Docetic Mountain, CD (Coptic Cat, 2009)
- Baalstorm, Sing Omega, CD/LP (Coptic Cat, 2010)

Death Shanties

- Crabs, LP (Bomb Shop, 2014)
- Psychic Rome, LP (Goldenlab, 2015)

Directing Hand

- Bells for Augustin Lesage, CD/LP (Secret Eye Records, 2005)
- Love Will Waste My Body, CD-R (Memoirs of an Aesthete, 2005)
- An Old Soul At The Helm, CD-R (Chocolate Monk, 2005)
- What Put the Blood, LP (Dancing Wayang, 2008)
- Songs from the Red House, LP (Singing Knives Records, 2008)

Jandek

- Glasgow Sunday, CD/DVD (Corwood Industries, 2005)
- Newcastle Sunday, CD/DVD (Corwood Industries, 2006)
- Glasgow Monday, CD/DVD (Corwood Industries, 2006)
- Glasgow Friday, CD/DVD (Corwood Industries, 2008)
- Where Do You Go From Here, CD (Corwood Industries, 2011)

Tight Meat Duo/Trio

- Vanishing Fist, CD (Bo'Weavil, 2007)
- Tight Meat Duo, 8" (Altvinyl, 2007)
- Ganges Letdown, CD-R (No label, 2007)

Richard Youngs & Alex Neilson

- Ourselves, CD (VHF Records, 2004)
- Beating Stars, LP (HP Cycle Records, 2005)
- Partick Rain Dance, CD (VHF Records, 2005)
- Road Is Open Life, CD (Celebrate Psi Phenomenon, 2006)
- Electric Lotus, CD/LP (VHF Records, 2007)
