= Vibracathedral Orchestra =

- Also known as: VCO
- Origin: Leeds, West Yorkshire, England, United Kingdom
- Genres: Drone; free folk; experimental
- Years active: 1998–present
- Labels: VHF, Giardia, Eclipse, U-Sound, Qbico, Textile, Freedom From
- Members: Adam Davenport; Michael Flower; Julian Bradley; Bridget Hayden; Neil Campbell

Vibracathedral Orchestra is an England-based drone ensemble that has been active since 1998.

== Biography ==
The group were formed in Leeds in 1998 when Mick Flower, Neil Campbell and Julian Bradley, who had released a number of homemade cassettes together, joined with Bridget Hayden and Adam Davenport.

Most of the group's earliest recordings, most made by recording live to 2-track, were self-released though many underground labels, including VHF Records, Giardia, Eclipse, U-Sound, Qbico, Textile and Freedom From, have also put out a number of Vibracathedral records. They have twice been featured in session on Resonance FM, given an hour-long slot each time.

Although very much a fixed unit, the line-up has been occasionally augmented by the likes of Matthew Bower, John Godbert, Richard Youngs, John Clyde Evans (latterly known as Tirath Singh Nirmala), and Tom Greenwood (of Jackie-O Motherfucker). Julian Bradley left the group in 2004 with both Neil Campbell and Bridget Hayden following him in 2006. A new album, Wisdom Thunderbolt, featuring Chris Corsano and Matthew Bower as guests, was released on VHF in 2007. The group performed at the Colour Out of Space festival in Brighton in August 2008 with a line-up of Flower, Davenport and Bradley.

According to John F Szwed's biography of Sun Ra, Space is the Place, the original Vibra-Cathedral Orchestra was a 1930s jazz band from Ra's home town of Birmingham, Alabama, which was previously called the Sax-O-Society Orchestra.

== Discography ==
- Mothing CD-R (1998), self-released
- Copse CD-R (1998), self-released
- Falling Free You and Me/Filling Sacks with Coloured Scraps 10-inch (1999), self-released
- The Vibracathedral String Quartet CD-R (1999), self-released
- Music for Red Breath CD-R (2000), self-released
- Vibracathedral String Band / Vibracathedral Drum Troupe 7-inch (2000), Freedom From
- Lino Hi CD (2000), Giardia
- Hollin CD-R (2000), self-released
- Versatile Arab Chord Chart CD (2001), VHF
- Long Live the Weeds CD-R (2001), self-released
- Their Spines Crumble for a Hug cassette (2001), self-released
- My Gate's Open, Tremble by My Side (2001), Roaratorio
- Hot Booty CD-R (2001), VHF
- Live in Newcastle and Leeds 1999 cassette (2001), Matching Head Tapes
- The One You Call the Ghost Train 7-inch (2001), Tonschact
- Dabbling with Gravity and Who You Are (2002), VHF
- Wearing Clothes of Ash / Baptism Bar Blues split with Jackie-O Motherfucker (2002), Textile
- split with Low (2002), Misplaced Music
- MMICD CD-R (2003), self-released
- Girls with Rocks in Their Hands 7-inch (2003), Great Pop Supplement
- Rain Gutter Teasing Rusty Cat Sneezing split 7-inch with Phonophani (2003), Safe as Milk
- Hex Hostess CD-R (2003), self-released
- Wings over America split with Sunroof! (2003), VHF
- The Queen of Guess (2003), VHF
- U-Sound volume 13: Live in Manchester/Leeds CD-R (2003), U-Sound
- Ragged and Right CD-R (2003), self-released
- Royal Park / Brudenell 7-inch (2003), Gold Soundz
- untitled double LP (2004), self-released
- Live on WFMU (2004), Eclipse
- Pontiac Lady triple CD-R (2004), VHF
- Resonance Session CDR (self-released 2005)
- Qbico U-Night 2LP, 2 sides by VCO (Qbico 2005)
- Øyenstikker utbrudd CD-R (2005) self-released
- Live at Audioscope '04 split 10-inch with The Telescopes (2005), Fourier Transform
- Smash! Smash! Smash! CD-R (2005), self-released
- Tuning to the Rooster CD (2005), Important
- Saved by the Bird CD-R (2005), self-released
- VCO @ ATP 2004 CD-R (2006), Spirit of Orr
- The Sun Balance / The Open Knot (2007), Qbico
- Wisdom Thunderbolt (2007), VHF
- Get it? / Baptised By Intuition, split 7-inch with Infinite Light (2009), Krayon Recordings
- The Momentary Aviary LP (2009), Manhand
- Joka Baya LP (2010), VHF
- The Secret Base LP (2010), VHF
- Smoke Song LP (2010), VHF
- untitled split CD-R w. Death Shanties (2015), self-released
