= National Park (band) =

Scottish band

- Origin: Glasgow, Scotland
- Years active: 1997–present
- Labels: Yield, Greatest Hiss, Earworm, Geographic
- Members: John Hogarty; Simon Shaw; Jennifer Hamilton; Finlay Macdonald
- Past members: Eilidh Rogers; Michael McGaughrin; Gerard Love; Jode Henderson; Scott Walker
- Website: www.nationalparksite.com

National Park is a Scottish band formed in 1997 in Glasgow. The band's music has been described as having some similarities to Velvet Underground, Galaxie 500, and Yo La Tengo "without sounding like anything else.""

== History ==
The band was formed by former Telstar Ponies member John Hogarty and Scott Walker. In August 1997, the band played their first gig. Simon Shaw and Michael McGaughrin of the band V-Twin joined Hogarty and Walker, and played the bass and drums, respectively.

National Park's first single, "Great Western", was a 10" released on Earworm records; a ten-minute-long improvisation. It was recorded on a tape deck at an early rehearsal session. Despite the length of the track it was playlisted on Xfm London. Hogarty was also part of the Phantom Engineer project with David Keenan and Bill Wells. Collaborations with Future Pilot A.K.A. then followed on two tracks. The band also played live with many of their favourite bands, including Belle and Sebastian at the Shepherd's Bush Empire.

Scott Walker left the band in late 1998, and was replaced briefly by Alasdair Roberts (of Appendix Out) and later by Gerard Love of Teenage Fanclub. Walker did briefly return to play one of the guitars on the You Don't Need Darkness to Do What You Think is Right compilation version of "No More Rides", which was released by Geographic Music, a subsidiary of Domino Recording Company during 2001-2002. Through the 2000s, the band continued as a trio with Hogarty and Shaw being the constants.

In 2003, the band released a lathe-cut 7" single, "Background Frequencies", on an Australian label. In 2005 National Park released "The Only Stars" in Japan, which featured contributions by Bill Wells (piano), Sarah Martin (flute) and Mick Cooke (horn) of Belle and Sebastian. The song was released in the UK on 7” in 2006, backed by “La Solara”.

After more than a decade, the band returned to playing live in 2024 supporting Gerard Love, ex-Teenage Fanclub, on a couple of dates.

In 2025, the band lineup settled with Hogarty and Shaw being joined by Finlay Macdonald (guitar) and Jennifer Hamilton (drums and backing vocals). They released the Solo Demos EP in 2025 on Greatest Hiss.

In 2026, they finally released their first album, 'outside', made up of home recordings from 1997-2026.

== Discography ==
=== Singles ===
- "Great Western" (1998) 10" on Earworm
- "Norman Dolph's Money" (1999) 7" collaboration with Future Pilot AKA on Earworm
- "Secret Songs" (2003) 7" on Background Frequencies
- "The Only Stars" (2006) 7" on Yield

=== EPs ===
- "Solo Demos" (2025) on Greatest Hiss

=== Compilation appearances ===
- "Sterling", on Future Pilot A.K.A. vs. A Galaxy of Sound (2000)
- "No More Rides" on You Don't Need Darkness to Do What You Think Is Right (2002) Geographic
- "The Only Stars", on Crunk Into Up Vol. 3 (2005)
- ”Norman Dolph’s Money”, on Insane Energy Drop, mix CD included with The Pastels album, “Slow Summits” (2012) Domino Recording Co
