= Skullflower =

British noise rock band

- Origin: London, England
- Genres: Noise rock; experimental; free improvisation; drone
- Years active: 1987–present
- Labels: Broken Flag; Shock; hEADdirt; RRRecords; Noiseville; VHF Records; Sympathy for the Record Industry; Freek Records; tUMULT; Crucial Blast; Heavy Blossom; Turgid Animal; Utech; Not Not Fun, Matching Head; Second Layer; Posh Isolation; Neurot; Cold Spring; Stiff Opposition; WKN Records; Nashazphone
- Members: Matthew Bower
- Past members: Stuart Dennison; Stefan Jaworzyn; Gary Mundy; Alex Binnie; Stephen Thrower; Anthony DiFranco

Skullflower is a British noise rock band, formed in 1987 in London, England. Led by guitarist Matthew Bower, the band attained a cult following using a sound based on "sludgy, Black Sabbath-style riffs overlaid with feedback, fuzzed-out guitar noise, and throttling rhythms, all played at a high volume." Always an improvisational outfit, the band's music grew increasingly free-form over the course of their career, moving further away from the rock music form.

The band's lineup has been fluid; the early core members were Bower, drummer and vocalist Stuart Dennison and bassist and guitarist Stefan Jaworzyn. Other contributors included guitarist Gary Mundy of Ramleh, bassist Alex Binnie, bassist and drummer Stephen Thrower of Coil, and auxiliary bassist, guitarist, and drummer Anthony DiFranco.

== Legacy ==
In an interview with The Guardian in 2016, the band was cited as being an influence to American avant-garde metal band Neurosis.

== Selected discography ==
=== Studio albums ===
- Form Destroyer (Broken Flag, 1989)
- Xaman (Shock, 1990)
- IIIrd Gatekeeper (hEADdIRt, 1992)
