= Richard Youngs =

English musician

- Born: 29 May 1966 (age 59); Cambridge
- Origin: Cambridge, England
- Genres: Experimental, folktronica, progressive rock
- Occupation: Musician
- Instruments: Vocals, guitar, various
- Years active: 1979–present
- Labels: Jabberwok, No Fans, Jagjaguwar, VHF, Table of the Elements

Richard Youngs (born 29 May 1966) is an English musician based in Glasgow since the early 1990s. His catalogue of solo and collaborative work formally begins with Advent, first issued in 1990. He plays many instruments, most commonly choosing the guitar, but he has been known to use other instruments including the shakuhachi, accordion, theremin, dulcimer, a home-made synthesizer (common on early recordings) and even a motorway bridge. He also released an album which was entirely a cappella.

For many years, live performances were very occasional and almost always in Glasgow; he has stated publicly that he finds live performance "incredibly nerve-racking: stomach cramps, tension headaches...". However, in recent years, he has performed more regularly (including a tour of New Zealand in 2010 and a UK tour in support of Damon and Naomi in 2011) and many of his recent shows have been predominantly vocal - he told The Wire (issue 284) "I went to a laptop concert and decided I was going to sing".

== Style ==
"Oh My Stars"
"Oh My Stars" from Richard Youngs' 2003 album Airs of the Ear

His music has been noted for its diversity, with Dusted saying that he had been "defying strict genre classifications since the early nineties, swapping labels, styles, partners, motifs, and recording techniques as the desire has struck him". He has been recording for most of his life, telling Foxy Digitalis that "I've made music as long as I can remember - ever since I was a child - and recorded the stuff as long as I've had the technology - I began with a cheap cassette player. So, it's strange to think what it'd be like not to make or record music. It seems unnatural!". When reviewing his 1996 CD Festival, Melody Maker described him as "grand-meister of contemporary British improv, spiritual son of Eddie Prevost and Maddy Prior; gentle manipulator of English hymn-notics and religious incantations; protege, challenger and radicaliser of folk, blues, rock, minimalism and improvisation; translator for the sea and the rain and the sky; ambassador to war and peace, to love and anguish".

It could be suggested his musical styles range from folk to progressive rock to improvisation to electronics. Early works were characterized by a somewhat minimalist lo-fi production quality, with Youngs working mostly on a reel-to-reel 4-track machine or recording directly to minidisc. However, he has been using professional standard computer-based recording systems for over a decade.

== Collaborations ==
A keen collaborator, he has released albums with Matthew Bower, Brian Lavelle, Neil Campbell, Stephen Todd, Makoto Kawabata, Alex Neilson, Andrew Paine (under their given names and under the group names Ilk and Urban Parable), Telstar Ponies, and his longest standing partner, Simon Wickham-Smith. He has performed live with Heather Leigh Murray, Vibracathedral Orchestra and also with Matthew Bower's groups Sunroof! and Skullflower. He was also a member of the collective A Band.

=== Jandek ===
Youngs has also gained attention from his live performances for the notoriously reclusive American avant-folk/blues singer-songwriter Jandek. Youngs can be heard on the Glasgow Sunday, Newcastle Sunday and Glasgow Monday albums, which were recorded at Jandek's first 3 (known) live performances. He also appears on Glasgow Friday and Camber Sands Sunday. There was one further show at which Youngs appeared but drummer Alex Neilson (who completed the line-up on all these shows) has advised the Brainwashed website that this performance - at Mono in Glasgow on 18 May 2006 (the day after the performance released as "Bristol Wednesday") - did not record successfully. For some time, this left no further available live performances with Youngs as a participant available for release. However, the trio reunited in Manchester, UK on 21 April 2012 and again in Glasgow on 6 April 2013.

A Jandek studio album was released on Corwood Industries in 2011 titled Where Do You Go From Here. As with all Jandek releases, no performer credits are listed. However, some listeners have claimed that the album was recorded by the trio of Smith, Youngs and Neilson, with Youngs' voice being identified on some tracks.

== Labels ==
He has recorded for over a dozen independent record labels, with VHF releasing much of his collaborative work and Jagjaguwar issuing many of his solo albums, their first being a reissue of Sapphie. Other labels have included Dekorder, Fourth Dimension, Freek, Fusetron, Majora, Table of the Elements, Volcanic Tongue and his own labels, beginning with Jabberwok in the 1980s, and then the self-deprecatingly named No Fans Records. In December 2015 the Revived Glass label, Glass Redux, released a new Youngs album Inside the Future on CD & Download.

=== No Fans Records ===
Richard founded No Fans Records 1990 and he releases only his own solo and collaborative work through the imprint with some items released in very small numbers. A number of No Fans releases have been reissued in larger editions by other labels.

NFR discography

- NFR01 - Advent LP - (300 copies pressed, 1990)
- NFR03 - New Angloid Sound LP (co-release with Forced Exposure, 300 copies pressed, 1993)
- NFC02 - Tape Hiss cassette (by Tape Hiss, a trio of Youngs, Neil Campbell and Stewart Walden) (1994)
- NFR04 - Zenith CD (with Ilk, 500 copies pressed, 1998)
- NFR05 - Nova Scotia Breakout CDR (very limited, as few as 5 copies exist, 2005)
- NFR06 - Summer Wanderer CDR (1st edition limited to around 10-20 copies, all given away by Richard - 2005, 2nd edition in alternate packaging available commercially, quantity unknown - 2006)
- NFR07 - Garden of Stones CDR (limited to around 35 copies, sold at concerts in Portugal, 2005)
- NFR08 - The Wood Is Barren, My Mountain Is Lonely CDR (with Andrew Paine, limited to 10 copies, 2005)
- NFR09 - Multi-Tracked Shakuhachi CDR (initially limited to around 30 copies but later repressed with an amended back cover, 2006)
- NFR10 - No Home Like Place CDR (distributor Volcanic Tongue stated that there were just 18 copies, 2006) nb - released after NFR11
- NFR11 - (untitled) CDR (no formal title, edition unknown, 2006)
- NFR12 - 20th Century Jams CDR (disc states "recorded during the 1980s and 1990s in Glasgow, Harpenden and St. Albans", edition unknown, 2007)
- NFR13 - 21st Century Jams CDR (companion volume to the above with material from 2000, 2001 and 2007, c. 60 copies, 2007)
- NFR14 - Somerled CDR (recorded April–May 2007, all copies come with a "No Fans" sew-on patch, edition unknown, 2007)
- NFR15 - Three Handed Star CDR (limited to 50 copies, only available through Volcanic Tongue, 2008. Was listed as "Three Headed Star". No information on packaging; titles encoded on disc using CD Text)
- NFR16 - Nerston Surface/First Voice To Earth CDR (limited to 50 copies in hand-painted sleeves, only available through Volcanic Tongue, no information on packaging, 2008)
- NFR17 - Live in Salford CDR (limited to 50 copies, only available through Volcanic Tongue, 2008)
- NFR18 - Stormcrash LP (all copies come in a "No Fans" tote bag, 2012)
- NFR19 - Library Assistants cassette (by Library Assistants - a collaboration between Richard and Liam Stefani, limited to 50 copies, 2012)

== Recent work ==
In recent years, Youngs has performed live more often, including shows in the UK, Canada and Italy. He toured New Zealand in late 2010 and the US in 2013. His release schedule is as prolific as ever, releasing 5 new albums in 2013. He now records for Ba Da Bing Records, his first album for the label being Summer Through My Mind, and Glass Records Redux in the UK, the first Glass release being Inside the Future in December 2015.

== Discography ==
=== Early recordings ===
Youngs's 1980s recordings were mostly as Omming For Woks - principally Youngs and Andrew Trussler with Barry Lamb joining them for the Show Me A Sane Man EP. Several privately issued cassettes on their own Jabberwok label exist, including Living in Harmony (1984) and Shouting The Silent Slogan (1986) and a clutch of compilation appearances including Sympathy on "Time And Time Again" with Assorted Artists (Fragment 1985) and Marjorie Daw on Sensationnel N°5 - All with voices (Illusion Productions 1987).

Jabberwok issued several cassette compilations which featured OFW material including Fugitive Pieces (1984), The Great Difficult Music Swindle (1985), and Cars and T-Shirts (1985). There was also a 1985 collaboration - Rock and Roll Should Have Stopped With Bill Haley - with The Strolling Ones.

Two further cassettes came to light through being offered on eBay. Both are primarily solo Youngs and appear under the artist name The Creation Room - Dark Shadow Breath b/w Roog Confetti and Apricot Tree & Will To Tedium b/w 19 Used Postage Stamps (the latter being explicitly referred to by Youngs in The Wire, issue 259 and reissued on the limited edition 20th Century Jams CDR in 2007). The former features a number of collaborators, including Trussler. A further Creation Room cassette Music that Undid Him in a Japanese Minute (1985) has been listed on Discogs; again, this is primarily solo Youngs with a contribution from Simon Batley on two tracks. Other recordings issued under this name include the cassette Music From the Creation Room (1984) and a compilation song entitled "Sometimes For Him".

=== Solo recordings ===
- Advent - LP (No Fans, 1990), CD (Table of the Elements 1997), CD reissue (Jagjaguwar 2004), LP reissue (Jagjaguwar 2006)
- Mundanity - cassette - one side only, other side by Neil Campbell (Cakehole 1993)
- New Angloid Sound - LP (Forced Exposure/No Fans, 1993)
- Motorway - cassette (Chocolate Monk 1995 - some copies run out during the final track)
- Festival - CD (Table of the Elements 1996)
- Sapphie - CD (Oblique 1998) CD reissue (Jagjaguwar 2000), LP (Jagjaguwar 2006)
- House Music - CD (Meme 1998)
- Making Paper - CD (Jagjaguwar 2001)
- May - CD (Jagjaguwar 2002)
- Airs of the Ear CD (Jagjaguwar 2003)
- 171 Used Train Tickets - one sided 10-inch; a spoken word piece from 1990 (Fusetron 2004)
- River Through Howling Sky - CD (Jagjaguwar 2004)
- The Naïve Shaman - LP/CD (Jagjaguwar 2005)
- Nova Scotia Breakout CDR (No Fans 2005)
- Summer Wanderer - CDR (private edition - No Fans 2005), CDR reissue (No Fans 2006), LP (Gipsy Sphinx 2007)
- Garden of Stones- CDR (No Fans 2005, reissued as a download by The Wire to coincide with their cover story on Youngs later the same year)
- Multi-Tracked Shakuhachi - CDR (No Fans 2006)
- (Untitled) - CDR (No Fans 2006)
- No Home Like Place - CDR (No Fans 2006)
- 20th Century Jams - CDR (No Fans 2007)
- 21st Century Jams - CDR (No Fans 2007)
- Somerled - CDR (No Fans 2007)
- Autumn Response - LP/CD (Jagjaguwar 2007)
- Three Handed Star - CDR (No Fans 2008)
- Nerston Surface/First Voice To Earth - CDR (No Fans 2008)
- Live in Salford - CDR (No Fans 2008)
- High Sun Energy/States of Time - 7-inch, limited to 300 (Dull Knife 2009)
- Sleep Deprivation Single - lathe cut 7-inch in deluxe packaging, limited to 100 (Five Minute Association 2009)
- Beyond the Valley of Ultrahits - CDR (2 editions, each of 100 numbered copies - Sonic Oyster Records 2009), LP (Jagjaguwar 2010)
- Like A Neuron - LP (Dekorder 2009)
- Under Stellar Stream - LP (Jagjaguwar 2009)
- Fen Flowers - 7-inch - split with Valet, part of the 4 single "Tsuki No Seika" series (Root Strata 2010)
- Inceptor - LP (300 copies, "art edition" of 10 with additional packaging and handwritten message from Richard - Volcanic Tongue 2010)
- Atlas of Hearts - LP (Apollolaan 2011)
- Be Brave, This World - 10-inch (Split with Annelies Monseré - Three:four Records 2011)
- I Dream of Mezzanine/Cloudplanes - LP (The Spring Press 2011)
- Amplifying Host - LP (Jagjaguwar 2011)
- Long White Cloud - LP (Grapefruit 2011)
- Amaranthine - LP (MIE Music, 2012)
- Core to the Brave - LP (Root Strata, 2012)
- Rurtain - LP (Alter, 2012 - original material by Youngs on Side 1, remixes by others on Side 2)
- Chasing the Apocalypse/Quiet the Loud World- lathe cut 7-inch, limited to 40. (MIE Music, 2013)
- Barbed Wire Explosion in the Kingdom of Atlantis - LP (Sonic Oyster Vinyl, 2013)
- Summer Through My Mind - LP/CD (Ba Da Bing!, 2013)
- No Retreat in Comfort CD (Ba Da Bing!, 2013 - sold on his 2013 US Tour)
- Calmont Breakdown CD (Fourth Dimension Records, 2013)
- Regions of the Old School 2LP (MIE Music, 2013)
- South Voyager LP (Atonal Industries, 2013)
- S/T - 10-inch (The Spring Press 2014)
- Red Alphabet in the Snow - LP (Preserved Sound, October 2014)
- Unicorns Everywhere - LP (Sonic Oyster, 2015)
- Inside the Future - CD/DL (Glass Redux, December 2015)

=== With Simon Wickham-Smith ===
- Lake - credited to R!!!S!!! - 2-LP set (No Fans, 1990), CD (VHF, 2000)
- Ceaucescu LP (Forced Exposure 1992)
- Asthma And Diabetes LP (Majora 1994)
- Kretinmuzak CD (Slask 1994)
- Worried About Heaven 7-inch (Fourth Dimension 1994)
- 444D 10-inch (Fourth Dimension 1995)
- Enedkeg LP (Majora 1996)
- Knish LP (Ignivomous 1996)
- Veil (For Greg) CD (Insignificant 1997), CD reissue (Jagjaguwar 2008)
- Red And Blue Bear CD (VHF 1997 - credited to R!!!S!!! on CD spine)
- Pulse of the Rooster CD (VHF 1998)
- The Enigma of Rotons - lathe cut 7-inch, only 50 copies exist (Hell's Half Halo 1998)
- Metallic Sonatas - CD (VHF 1999)
- LAmmERGEIER CD (VHF 2001)
- 5 Years CD (VHF 2006)
- 20 Years 1 LP & 3-CD set (VHF 2010 - contained an LP reworking their first ever recording and 3 previously unreleased albums - see below)
- The Random Sailor (NFR 2016)
- Parrots (NFR 2016)
- Caro-Kann (NFR 2016)

=== With Andrew Paine ===
- Zenith - as Ilk CD (No Fans 1998)
- Canticle - as Ilk - CD (VHF 2005)
- Mauve Dawn LP (Fusetron 2005)
- The Wood Is Barren, My Mountain Is Lonely CDR (No Fans 2005)
- Collodion Positives : Volume 1 CDR (Sonic Oyster Records 2006)
- Santos CDR (Sonic Oyster Records 2006)
- 1958 CDR (Sonic Oyster Records 2006)
- Forest of Swords CDR (Sonic Oyster Records 2006)
- The Memory Plain CDR (Sonic Oyster Records 2006)
- Roman Concrete - Volume 1 CDR (Sonic Oyster Records 2007)
- Rock Traveller CDR (Sonic Oyster Records 2007)
- Collodion Positives : Volume 2 CDR (Sonic Oyster Records 2007)
- Collodion Positives : Volume 3 CDR (Sonic Oyster Records 2008)
- The Language of the Court - as Ilk CDR (Sonic Oyster Records 2008)
- Hot Canyon Butter CDR (Sonic Oyster Records 2008)
- Snapshots of Rural England CDR (Sonic Oyster Records 2008)
- English Channel CDR (Sonic Oyster Records 2008)
- Collodion Positives : Volume 4 CDR (Sonic Oyster Records 2008)
- Panegyric Territories : Volume 1 - as Ilk CDR (Sonic Oyster Records 2009)
- The Great Level CDR (Sonic Oyster Records 2009)
- Earth Rod CDR (Sonic Oyster Records 2009)
- Tokyo Garden Suite CDR (Sonic Oyster Records 2009)
- Guide To Music CDR (Sonic Oyster Records 2010)
- The Horizon Project Mini CDR (La Station Radar 2010)
- Robot CDR (Sonic Oyster Records 2010)
- Urban Parable - as Urban Parable CDR (Sonic Oyster Records 2010)
- 4trackcassettemachine cassette (Sonic Oyster Cassettes 2010)
- Rotten Masters 7-inch EP (Sonic Oyster Vinyl 2012)

=== With the A Band ===
- Untitled - 7-inch (Any Old Records 1991)
- Anusol - cassette (1992) and CDR reissue (year unknown) (Chocolate Monk)
- Artex/A Lot - LP, Youngs on Side 2 only (Siltbreeze 1993)
- A Band - CD (private pressing- 1997. Hand-painted sleeves, Youngs part of the 18-piece line-up, recorded in Nottingham in 1991. 547 copies pressed.)
- A Band - LP - some copies featured a bonus CDR entitled TV Set For Winter (note - the discs read "TV Sets From Winter" - the former title is correct), LP contains some material also found on the 1997 CD release. Youngs edited the music together for this edition (Qbico 2002)
- There are several other A Band releases but only those which are confirmed to feature Richard have been included here. A discography for the A Band is included in their article.

=== With Neil Campbell ===
- Tape Hiss - with Tape Hiss - Youngs, Stewart Walden and Neil Campbell - cassette (No Fans 1994)
- How The Garden Is - with Neil Campbell LP (HP Cycle 2001)
- Astral Social Club #10: Live at Subcurrent - with Neil Campbell and Tirath Singh Nirmala as Astral Social Club - CD-R (Astral Social Club 2006). Documents a live Astral Social Club performance at Subcurrent 2006, Glasgow, Scotland, with Youngs guesting on sound effects and electronics.
- Skelp/Ginnel - by Astral Social Club. A 7-inch by Neil Campbell coupled with a CDR of remixes including one by Youngs (Trensmat Records 2008)
- Octuplex - by Astral Social Club - Youngs appears on Track 5 - CD (VHF 2009)

=== With Matthew Bower ===
- Site/Realm - with Matthew Bower LP (VHF/Insample 1995) - has been listed as a split album with a side from each, in fact, all the music is collaborative.
- Adieu, All You Judges - with Skullflower, CD is split with Ramleh (Broken Flag, 1995)
- Sorties - with Skullflower cassette, Youngs appears on some tracks (Broken Flag 1996)
- This is Skullflower - with Skullflower, Youngs plays guitar on The Pirate Ship of Reality Is Moving Out CD (VHF 1996)
- Delicate Autobahn Under Construction - with Sunroof!, Youngs appears on some tracks 2CD (VHF 1997)
- Slipstream - with Sunroof!, Youngs appears on some tracks CDR (Rural Electrification Program 1999)
- Mountain Tasting - with Total, Youngs appears on side one 7-inch (lathe-cut, edition of 50, self-released by Bower, circa 1999)
- Bliss - with Sunroof! - Youngs plays guitar on Distoria CD (VHF 2001)
- Relayer - with Youngsbower CD (VHF 2002)

=== With Brian Lavelle ===
- Radios CD (Freek 1996)
- Radios 2 CD (Freek 1997)
- Radios 3,4,5 3-CD set (Freek 1997)
- Radios 6 CDR (Bake Records 1998)
- Radios 7 CDR (Bake Records 2000)
- Radios 8 CDR (Bake Records 2000)

=== With Alex Neilson ===
- Ourselves CD (VHF 2004)
- Beating Stars LP (HP Cycle 2004)
- Partick Raindance CD (VHF 2005)
- Belsayer Time - with Neilson and Alastair Galbraith - LP, numbered edition of 900 (Time-Lag 2006)
- Road Is Open Life CD (Celebrate Psi Phenomenon 2006)
- Electric Lotus/Lotus Edition - LP & CD set (VHF 2007)

=== With Jandek ===
- Glasgow Sunday - CD and DVD (Corwood Industries 2005)
- Newcastle Sunday - 2CD and DVD (Corwood Industries 2006)
- Glasgow Monday: The Cell - 2CD (2006) and DVD (2007) (Corwood Industries)
- Glasgow Friday - CD (2008) and DVD (2009) (Corwood Industries)
- Camber Sands Sunday - CD (2010) (Corwood Industries)
- Where Do You Go From Here - CD (2011) (Corwood Industries) (uncredited - see above)

=== Other collaborations ===
- St Helena/Juniper - 7-inch single, Juniper with Stephen Todd (Insample 1994)
- Denny/Twechar - with Leather Mole 7-inch (Crank Automotive 1995)
- Georgians - with Stephen Todd CD (VHF 1996)
- Big Band Xerox - with PD cassette (Chocolate Monk, 1996) - a ten-piece live incarnation of Blackburn, West Lothian-based improv/noise group Prick Decay featuring Youngs, Neil Campbell, Dylan Nyoukis, Sticky Foster and Tim Moulder amongst others. Nyoukis is the co-founder of the Chocolate Monk imprint and runs it to this day.
- Brewery of Eggshells - with Telstar Ponies 12-inch single/CD (Fire 1996)
- Voices From The New Music - with Telstar Ponies LP/CD (Fire 1996) - note that Youngs only appears on this Telstar Ponies album and the above tie-in single. He is credited throughout as a member of the band rather than as a guest artist.
- Protection Spells - with Songs: Ohia CD (Secretly Canadian, 2000) - a limited edition album of improvised material recorded in various cities during a European tour in 1999. Youngs is one of the guest musicians.
- eponymous - with Kawabata Makoto (of Acid Mothers Temple) CD (VHF 2001)
- Bluster, Cragg, & Awe - with Tirath Singh Nirmala - Youngs appears on one track - CD (Digitalis 2006)
- Richard Youngs & Tirath Singh Nirmala - with Tirath Singh Nirmala LP (HP Cycle 2007)
- Yellow Gardens/Energy Pond - with Luke Fowler 7-inch (Fourth Dimension Records, 2012)
- Electric Cactus of Mind - with Stephen Todd (NFR 2016)
- All Hands Around the Moment with Raül Refree (Soft Abuse, 2021)

=== Miscellaneous ===
- String Quartets, Loops, Garden Talk - by Neil Campbell - the 6-part track Garden Talk (for found tape and synthesizer) is credited as having been composed by Campbell and "assembled" by Youngs (self-released CDR - material from between 1994 and 1997).
- Psychiatric Underground - by Ceramic Hobs - the track Meeting The Summertime has the credit "score by Richard Youngs" - he provided an 11 note handwritten score for the keyboard part, which spells out "ceramichobs" if you move the musical notation up the alphabet. Neil Campbell is one of 4 people credited as having provided tapes for the same track. (Pumf/Mental Guru CD, c. 1999)
- Richard has also published a recipe book. Cook Vegan (Ashgrove Press) was printed in 1996 and reprinted in 2001, receiving favourable reviews.

=== Unreleased material ===
- A 10-inch record split between Wickham-Smith and Youngs (contributing "Papa Deo Bilong Mipela" and "Wynding Fall of Mind" respectively) was announced but has yet to be released.
- Other items known to exist or to be in limited circulation include Festival of Carols, a cassette of Christmas songs from around 1990/1, given to friends in lieu of Christmas cards (The Wire, issue 236 reports that a total of 11 copies were made). Tracks included readings of "God Rest Ye Merry, Gentlemen", "The Boar's Head Carol" and "Jesus Born Today". Four other tracks from this cassette were remastered and included on the A Glasgow Wassail CDR in 2007, a compilation of Christmas songs curated by Andrew Paine (see Compilations entry).
- In addition, there is a cassette of the music Richard composed for Niall Ashdown's play Hungarian Bird Festival, also featured in a later BBC radio adaption and a shelved Ilk album titled Herald, a track from which, "Carillon", was made available for download via the Sonic Oyster Records Myspace page over Christmas 2008 before appearing on the 2009 compilation The Continuing Saga of the Visiting Kitten. Richard recorded a contribution for a Resonance FM series called No Place Like Home - this formed the basis of the very limited No Home Like Place album issued in 2006. There were 2 radio sessions with Brian Lavelle; one piece from four recorded for radiotuesday has been issued (see below) and a live recording for Radio 3 made at the Purcell Room in London in 1996 remains unreleased. The Mauve Dawn album with Andrew Paine is part of a proposed trilogy but the other 2 albums have yet to appear. The website of US label Siltbreeze sees them claiming to have rejected a Youngs album (catalogued as SB-74 ) but, as no title is listed, it is not known if this was released elsewhere.

=== Compilations, etc ===
- (untitled) - on In God We Trust a/k/a Nickel, a promotional 7-inch single also featuring Jim O'Rourke, Faust, Tony Conrad and Keith Rowe (AMM). 250 copies only (Table of the Elements 1995)
- Oh Father Soil - on Waiting To Be Old CD (Opprobrium 1997)
- Wofer - with Brian Lavelle on e.g. Sometime Instant, a compilation documenting a short lived Glasgow radio station radiotuesday. Lavelle & Youngs recorded 4 tracks for their session of which this is one. The remainder have not been issued. (radiotuesday, 2000)
- 1966 - on I Am A Photographer, a tribute album to the film "Blow Up" (Plain Recordings 2000)
- The Sea Is Madness - on VPRO De Avonden XMAS 2000 CDR (VPRO 2000). A brief version recorded for the "De Avonden" programme.
- Come Hear Us Now - on Festivalsampler 2001, a promotional CD for the 2001 KRAAK festival (not commercially released)
- Worse Than Pug - on Freak On!, also featuring Vibracathedral Orchestra and Sunroof! CDR (VHF 2001)
- Like Tigers Now - on Back into The Shadows CD - free with Comes with a Smile magazine 2002 (Volume 7 of their compilation series)
- The World Is Silence in Your Head - on Song to the Siren DVD by Damon & Naomi on tour with Kurihara. Youngs supported Damon & Naomi at King Tut's Wah Wah Hut in Glasgow and is shown both backstage and performing. This is an alternate, more developed version of the song to that found on Making Paper and is performed on acoustic guitar rather than piano. He does not appear on the CD part of the package (Sub Pop 2002)
- Oceanic Days - on CD given away with issue 13 of Fanzine Overdub 2003
- Time of Tomorrow - on Guitars Undressed CD Marrakech Recordings 2003
- The World Is Silence in Your Head - on the Routine Jazz #2 DJ mix compilation CD by Kei Kobayashi. JVC (Japan) 2003. Same version as appears on Making Paper
- New Morning - on * (There Is No Hidden Meaning) - A Compilation 2CDR Kabuki Kore c. 2004
- Sonar in My Soul - on Mind The Gap Volume 59, given with Gonzo Circus magazine issue dated December 2005/January 2006. Same version as appears on The Naive Shaman
- House of Constant Song - with Alex Neilson - on Not Alone, a 5-CD benefit album on Jnana Records, with all proceeds donated to Médecins Sans Frontierès specifically to target their work on the AIDS epidemic in Africa - 2006
- Soon It Will Be Fire - on Motion, Heat, Noise and Waste, given with Plan B issue 18, February 2007. Same version as appears on Sapphie
- The Welcome Sailor - on Migrating Bird: The Songs of Lal Waterson LP/CD (Honest Jon's 2007).
- Angels From The Realms, The Holly and the Ivy, A Gloucestershire Wassail, There Is A Path and Corner of the Season - on A Glasgow Wassail CDR (Sonic Oyster Records 2007 - Corner of the Season is an original composition written and performed by Youngs and Andrew Paine, all other tracks come from the Festival of Carols tape noted above).
- It's All Waves - with Alex Neilson - on George Ferguson McKeating, a 2-CDR compilation by British journalist and writer Scott McKeating with all proceeds going to the Pancreatic Cancer Research Fund (Bells Hill 2009).
- Boughs (For The Trees) [solo recording] and Carillon [with Andrew Paine as Ilk] - on The Continuing Saga of the Visiting Kitten a CDR compilation with all proceeds going to Cats Protection (Sonic Dust Recordings 2009).
- Broke Up By Night on Heart And Soul a Jagjaguwar compilation CD given away free with Uncut Magazine (issue dated March 2010). Same version as appears on Under Stellar Stream.
- Save The Happy People [solo recording] and Another Great Burst of Popular Enthusiasm [with Andrew Paine] - on SOR 50, the 50th (and, to date, last) CDR on Sonic Oyster Records (Sonic Oyster Records 2011)
