= VHF Records =

American record label

VHF Records is an American record label, known for their extensive work with several major experimental artists. The label is based in the Washington, DC suburb of Fairfax, Va., and it initially focused on indie and experimental bands from that region. The label has since branched out to release innovative and offbeat music from around the world, although Northern Virginia artists are still prominently featured in the catalog. The label was founded by Bill Kellum in 1991, originally to release a single each by his own band, Rake, and that of his friends, Wingtip Sloat. After a handful of releases by both bands, Kellum acquired the US rights to the first releases by UK psychedelic group Flying Saucer Attack including the CD edition of their debut album. Following this, Kellum released an album by Matthew Bower's Skullflower, which in turn led to the release of an LP by Bower and Richard Youngs. Since then, Youngs has released a dozen collaborative albums on the label, including 6 with Simon Wickham-Smith (who has also essayed two solo sets for the imprint), 3 with Alex Neilson, one from his progressive rock unit Ilk (with Andrew Paine) and one with Makoto Kawabata. Kawabata has also released 3 solo albums for the label. Other artists include Vibracathedral Orchestra, Roy Montgomery, Jack Rose, Pelt, and Stephen O'Malley's Æthenor. Matthew Bower released another 2 Skullflower albums on the label, one Total release and several more under his most recent solo alias, Sunroof!.

Their most recent releases have been from former VCO member Neil Campbell's Astral Social Club, VCO themselves, Philadelphia folk unit Fern Knight's 2006 release Music for Witches and Alchemists and their 2008 self-titled release Fern Knight, and a dual LP/CD set from Youngs and Neilson. A long-delayed Wingtip Sloat compilation has also finally been released in recent weeks.

== Current artists ==
- Alexander Turnquist
- Ashtray Navigations
- Astral Social Club
- Black Twig Pickers
- Daniel O'Sullivan
- Doldrums
- Fern Knight
- Flying Saucer Attack
- Jack Rose
- Makoto Kawabata
- Richard Youngs
- Pelt
- Rake
- Roy Montgomery
- Skullflower
- Sunroof!
- Vibracathedral Orchestra
- Wingtip Sloat
