= Feng Shui (album) =

Studio album by Doldrums
- Released: April 27, 1998
- Recorded: 1995 – 1997
- Genre: Post-rock
- Length: 62:04
- Label: VHF

Doldrums chronology
Desk Trickery (1999)	Feng Shui (1998)

Professional ratings
Review scores
Source	Rating
Allmusic	4/5 stars
Pitchfork	(5.3/10)

Feng Shui is the fourth studio album by Doldrums, released on April 27th, 1998, by VHF Records.

== Track listing ==
All music is composed by Doldrums.

No.	Title	Length
1.	"X-Ray Me, Bert"	3:14
2.	"Left in an Airport Gift Shop" (Part 1)	4:33
3.	"Left in an Airport Gift Shop" (Part 2)	5:00
4.	"Left in an Airport Gift Shop" (Part 3)	11:00
5.	"Ascending Copper Mountain" (Part 1)	11:08
6.	"Ascending Copper Mountain" (Part 2)	6:02
7.	"Ascending Copper Mountain" (Part 3)	11:49
8.	"Come Back, Lao Tzu"	9:18

== Personnel ==
Adapted from Feng Shui liner notes.

Doldrums

- Justin Chearno – guitar, engineering
- Bill Kellum – bass guitar, engineering
- Matt Kellum – drums, engineering

== Release history ==
Region	Date	Label	Format	Catalog
United States	2000	VHF	CD	VHF#32
