= Neil Campbell (musician) =

British musician (born 1966)

Neil Campbell (born 19 May 1966) is a British musician, notable for his vast catalogue and his many collaborations. In 2005, The Wire declared that he, Richard Youngs and Matthew Bower had "provided the map co-ordinates for much of what passed for a post-punk UK underground during most of the 80s and 90s". Pitchfork media have referred to him as "one of the most important experimental musicians of the last 20 years".

== Early years ==
Campbell was born in Scotland. He began making music in 1979 using whatever came to hand, having already developed a firm belief in improvisation, and that virtuosity would negatively impact upon the results.

In 1984, he first made contact with Richard Youngs when his Kettering based group ESP Kinetic applied to appear on a cassette compilation on Youngs' Jabberwok label. Although unsuccessful, he persevered for a while with ESP Kinetic and its successor, Redemption Inc, before extending his range outside the rock band format. Initially and typically for the period, much of Campbell's work was released on small tape labels or by Campbell himself and it is nigh-on impossible to document all of his releases.

== From the "A" Band to Vibracathedral Orchestra ==
However, it was as a constant member of Nottingham's A Band that he met several future collaborators and first came to the attention of the international underground with an album "Artex/A Lot" being issued on Siltbreeze in the US. One reason for the A Band's growth in numbers is that, for each of their performances, he refused to appear onstage unless there was a new member. In 2007 Campbell was again involved in the revived A Band's recording and live activities.

As well as this, he often collaborated with UK noise music/art unit Smell and Quim under the alias D. Foist while also recording with Scottish DIY punk-improv duo Prick Decay on several occasions.

Towards the end of the 1990s Campbell hooked up with Julian Bradley to record 5 cassettes and an LP before they asked Michael Flower to join them, adding Bridget Hayden and Adam Davenport to form Vibracathedral Orchestra, who recorded and released prolifically, with many self-released items joining their US CD releases on VHF and Giardia. Campbell still found time to guest with Matthew Bower's groups Total and Sunroof!, work with people like Stewart Walden (especially as SWANC - the name taken from their initials), Rob Hayler, Phil Todd (of Ashtray Navigations), Universal Indians and (perhaps inevitably) Campbell Kneale and to record solo albums such as These Premises Are No Longer Bugged and Sol Power. He also finally made a duo album with Richard Youngs called How The Garden Is. He took to the CD-R medium as enthusiastically as he did the cassette and many limited releases appeared on labels in the UK, U.S., New Zealand and Australia.

== Astral Social Club ==
Campbell left Vibracathedral Orchestra in 2006 and now concentrates on his Astral Social Club project. He has released several CD-Rs, with a "best of" CD compilation culled from the first 7 volumes released on VHF Records last year. He also issued a MP3 disc containing 256 kbit/s files of all the tracks from those 7 albums as well as a vinyl only LP for Qbico entitled Star Guzzlers. He also performs live under this name, securing the services of his friends Richard Youngs and Tirath Singh Nirmala for a performance in Glasgow in April 2006, and those of Arttu Partinen for a performance in Manchester. As of 2015 Neil is working on setting a chapter of James Joyce's Finnegans Wake to music, for the Waywords and Meansigns project.

== Music Mundane ==
In 2007, Campbell launched Music Mundane, a new label, with the first two releases being an expanded CD reissue of his "Sol Power" album and a revised CD-R edition of his friend Stewart Walden's limited edition cassette "Cucumber Sandwich", the first 25 copies of which come with a 3" CD-R containing remixes of the album by Astral Social Club. In 2008, he released an archive CDR of ESP Kinetic material, entitled "Fleck-Nor"

== Discography ==
As stated above, a complete discography would be virtually impossible to compile. This list is an expanded and updated version of a select discography which originally appeared in the Perfect Sound forever interview.

=== Solo work ===
- Mundanity split w/Richard Youngs TC (Cakehole 1993)
- Face of Scurf TC (Union Pole 1994)
- Itinerant String Section CD-R (Freedom From 1996)
- These Premises Are No Longer Bugged LP (Giardia/Fusetron 1997)
- Excerpt from the Never-Ending Bowed Metal Song CD-R (Fencing Flatworm 2000)
- The Hearing Force of the Humanverse CD-R (Fencing Flatworm 2001)
- "Fuzzjam|Dub" MP3 (TechNOH 2002) (later reissued on SOL POWR)
- "Rolling Exploding"/"Sky Full of Love" 7" (limited to 40 copies) (Gold Soundz 2003)
- Boomerang is Love TC/CD-R (no label 2004)
- Lost Predelic Moonshine Music Tape/CD-R (Chocolate Monk 2004)
- "Rabbitfoot Oof" on untitled mini CD-R, two other tracks by Fickle (First Person 2004)
- Rock on Brain cassette (Gods of Tundra 2006)
- SOL POWR LP (Lal Lal Lal 2003), CD (Music Mundane 2007)
- Track on Gooseweek comp 7" (Oska)
- Is Not Here TC (Union Pole)
- split w/Jazz Buffoon TC (Scum)
- "Wheel Ramble/Real Scramble" 10" (no label)
- Casio Rapman and Electric Guitar TC (Matching Head)
- The Singing Pubis TC (no label)
- "Pan Wagon Oasis" on split w/Campbell Kneale 7" (Celebrate Psi Phenomenon)
- String Quartets, Loops, Garden Talk CD-R (no label)
- "Paint Everything White/Blip Pneumonia" 7" (Giardia)
- "Mizzlefield Ploof Kingdom/Muttertown Birdsong Cindy" 7" (no label)
- Executive Silk Lips C30 (Chocolate Monk)
- Recycled Music Cassette (RRRecords)
- "Teasel"/"Thistle" Cassette (limited to 150 copies) (Heavy Tapes)
- The Hearing Force of the Humanverse CD-R (Fencing Flatworm)

=== Astral Social Club ===
- MCR Blast 8" lathe (Alt.vinyl)
- Passing Star / Solar Filament self-released CD-R
- Astral Social Club (VHF 2006)
- Star Guzzlers LP (Qbico 2007)
- Neon Pibroch CD (Important 2007)
- Super Grease LP (Important 2007)
- Model Town in Field of Mud LP (Textile 2008)
- Skelp/Ginnel 7" + CDR (CDR includes remixes by John Clyde Evans, Richard Youngs and Magnetize, Trensmat 2008)
- Monster Mittens 7" (features Karl Bauer of Axolotl - Dirty Knobby 2008)
- Octuplex (VHF #114 Jan 2009)
- Capitols Collapsed Cassette (Neon Blossom Records 2010)
- Generator Breaker LP (Dekorder 2011)
- Magic Smile CD (Wonderyou 2012)
- Electric Yep LP (Trensmat 2013)
- Destiny SNFU Cassette (NNA Tapes 2013)

As stated above, a majority of ASC music has been issued across a series of eponymous CD-Rs, all self-released by Campbell in limited numbers. At time of writing (November 2018), this series is now up to 24 volumes and includes live recordings with Tirath Singh Nirmala (also known as John Clyde Evans), Richard Youngs and Stewart Keith. For the Model Town in Field of Mud LP, ASC was a duo of Campbell and Evans.

=== Vibracathedral Orchestra ===
- See Vibracathedral Orchestra - Campbell features on virtually all of their releases to date (July 2008) and a discography appears on their page.

=== A Band ===
- See A Band - Campbell features on the majority of their releases and a discography appears on their page.

=== ESP Kinetic/Redemption Inc ===
These 1980s bands recorded several tapes but it is doubtful that any will be found without searching eBay. Campbell had a boxed set of ESP Kinetic cassettes placed on the shelves of Kettering Library after asking the library to order it. ESP Kinetic titles include: "Dance As Hallucination", "The Message Is No Message", "Mission", "fleck-NOR" and "Songs for Drowning Men". A CDR entitled "fleck-NOR" was issued by Campbell in 2008. Redemption Inc released a self-titled cassette and one entitled "Further Down The Spiral". There was also a cassette by Meat Your Mother entitled "Meat Dreams" which was also mainly Campbell's work. The track " Store Keep / Reward Report from the Head", which was originally released by ESP Kinetic in 1985 on cassette was featured on Unassimilated Sounds radio in 2015.

=== Smell & Quim ===
A prolific noise unit, Campbell is known to have appeared on the following releases:

- Your Enemy's Balls / What's Your Health Problem CD [Red Stream, US 1994]
- Diameter of Elvis' Colon CD [Pure/RRR, US 1995]
- Seven Inches Inside Vagina 7" (by S&Q and Merzbow) [SHF 1996]
- Piss with Drills of Blood 7" [Self Abuse, US 1996]
- Jim Seed Collector 7" [Praxis Dr. Bearmann, Germany 1996]
- Non-Stop Robotic Fornication 7" [Pinch-a-Loaf, US 1996]
- Non-Stop Robotic Stinky Horse Fisting 7" [Kubitsuri, Japan 1996]
- Quasi-Modo Cacandi S&Q/Expose Your Eyes collaboration cassette [SHF 1996]
- Retract Your Balls it's... cassette [Banned Productions, US 1996]
- Meat / Pregnant Asian Special CD + cassette [Old Europa Cafe, Italy 1997]
- Pushy Gothic Gnome Versus Charity Techno Gnome cassette [Spite, US 2000]
- Titwank cassette [Freedom From, US 2002]
- Oral CD (Part of 3xCD boxset along with "Perverse" by Taint and "The Beautiful" by Con-Dom) [Red Stream, US]
- 69 (S&Q/Mhlest) one-sided split LP [Bandaged Hand, UK]
- The Psychedelic Sounds of Smell & Quim and Tea Culture 7" (S&Q and Tea Culture) (BWCD/SHF)
- Autoficial 7" (V/A - S&Q/Haters/Con-Dom/Chop Shop) [Noisopoly, US]
- Pervertigo Porksword Billyclub (S&Q and K2) 7" [Kinky Musik Institute, Japan]
- Polk Salad Fanny 7" [SHF]
- Cosmic Bondage cassette [SHF]
- Chariot of the Cods cassette [SHF]
- Pro-Celebrity Mutual Masturbation cassette [Kubitsuri, Japan]
- Snizz Guzzlers cassette [SHF]
- Spermathalon cassette [Bandaged Hand, UK]

=== Julian Bradley/Neil Campbell ===
- First TC (no label)
- 2 TC (no label)
- Bradley Campbell Three TC (no label)
- V TC (no label)
- untitled LP (American Tapes)
- "Untitled" on Scenes From Ringing Isle 2CD (Rural Electrification Program/Betley Welcomes Careful Drivers/[K-RAA-K]3/Giardia/Swill Radio/Ecstatic Peace!/Freedom From/Polyamory)
- Scythe Apocalypse CD-R (33 copies made, given away at Colour Out of Space festival, Brighton, 2006) (no label 2006)
- The Lift, Brighton,14 March 1998 (Julian Bradley/Neil Campbell/Sticky Foster) CD-R (The Rhizome Label 1998)

=== Matthew Bower ===
Campbell appears on the following recordings by Total:

- Buffin' the Celestial Muffin CD (Rural Electrification Program 1995)
- Kaspar Hauser CD (Metonymic 1997)
- Merzbow Mixed Total cassette (w/ Merzbow) (Sterilized Decay 1997)
- Eternity's Beautiful Frontispiece CD (VHF 2000)

Campbell appears on the following recordings by Sunroof!:

- Delicate Autobahn Under Construction 2CD (VHF) Slipstream CD-R (Giardia; reissued by Rural Electrification Program)
- Found Star Sound CD (VHF)
- Temple Music Vols. 1&2 2CD-R (Rural Electrification Program) Bliss 2CD (VHF)

=== Richard Youngs ===
- Festival - Neil provides "tapes" on one track (Table of the Elements 1994)
- Motorway - Cassette - Neil plays percussion (a cardboard box) on two tracks (Chocolate Monk 1994)
- Georgians (Richard Youngs & Stephen Todd) (Neil plays on opening track, "Bananas'n'Muffins", on Georgians CD (VHF 1996)
- How the Garden Is (Neil Campbell/Richard Youngs) LP (HP Cycle 2000)

=== Neil Campbell/Stewart Walden ===
- Here Comes Fun CD-R (Slippytown 2002)
- Mouldy Roll TC and 2CD-R (PUMF 1992) (as "SWANC")

=== Prick Decay/Decaer Pinga ===
Decaer Pinga are Prick Decay by another name.

- !!!Cuba.Planet Cuba!!! TC (Union Pole 1995)
- "Vachement Click with Turntable Editions" on Studies For Postal Orgies TC (Chocolate Monk)
- Rate of CHB is in TC (Union Pole) Big Band Xerox TC (Chocolate Monk)
- "He'll Look Like Moses" on Studies For Postal Orgies Vol. 2 CD-R (Chocolate Monk)
- Electronic Honky (Decaer Pinga) TC (Polyamory)
- Strobelights to Boston (Neil Campbell & Decaer Pinga) CD-R (Chocolate Monk 2000)

=== Runzelstirn & Gurgelstøck & Schimpfluch-Gruppe ===
- Shitpflug CD-R (7 copies only) (Ignivomous 1997)
- Psycho-Physical Tests And Trainings With Rudolf Eb.er And R&G/Schimpfluch Personnel CD (Germany) CD credited to Rudolf Eb.er (Neil is credited, but in what capacity is unknown). (Selektion 1997)

=== One-off collaborations ===
Campbell has recorded with several bands and individuals on a one-off basis:

- Basquadeck Shelf (Neil Campbell (and friends) project) cassette, 1985 - released in 2001 by Fencing Flatworm Recordings at part of their Ordinance, Tape Only project (oTo T24)
- Durian Durian (Neil/Richard/Simon/Stewart) LP (Forced Exposure 1992) - not related to the film of the same name.
- Tape Hiss (Tape Hiss (Neil, Richard Youngs and Stewart Walden.)) cassette (No Fans 1994)
- Big band Xerox (PD (Dylan Nyoukis, Neil, Richard Youngs, Sticky Foster, Tim Moulder) Cassette (Chocolate Monk 1996)
- "Nice Duo Stewart" (Campbell* Vs Greenwood*) on lathe cut 7" Mary Dickson Says: Just Fucking Calm Down, Right? (other side by Cunt Eats Cock) (Hell's Half Halo 1996)
- The Cuckoos Sang in Their Appropriated Nests (Dead Man's Gravel) CD-R (Fencing Flatworm 2000)
- "Soun (An Anonymous And Random Compilation/Composition)" a single-sided 7" single consisting of extremely short contributions by a hundred artists including Neil. (Gameboy 2003)
- "Live at RRRecords"/"Long Distance Moan" (Neil Campbell and Sticky Foster) (8" vinyl) (alt.vinyl 2006) (features John Olson of Wolf Eyes as MC on side one).
- Live at Transmission Gallery, Glasgow (Neil Campbell and John Clyde-Evans) (Chocolate Monk 2005)
- Paekong Mae (Paekong Mae) LP (Giardia)
- untitled (Neil Campbell/Spykes) CD-R (American Tapes)
- In Luck (Neil Campbell and Rob Hayler) CD-R (Fencing Flatworm)
- Untitled collaboration with Sean McCann
