= Raining Down Diamonds =

Studio album by Jandek
- Released: 2005
- Recorded: Unknown
- Genre: Outsider music
- Length: 44:12
- Label: Corwood Industries
- Producer: Jandek

Jandek chronology
| Glasgow Sunday (2005) | Raining Down Diamonds (2005) | Khartoum (2005) |

Professional ratings
Review scores
| Source | Rating |
|---|---|
| Allmusic | 3/5 stars |

Raining Down Diamonds is the third of four albums released in 2005 by the musician Jandek. It was released by Corwood Industries (#0780) and is his 42nd overall. He is backed by fretless bass guitar.

== Track listing ==
| No. | Title | Length |
|---|---|---|
| 1. | "What Things Are" | 5:54 |
| 2. | "I Stared" | 4:42 |
| 3. | "It's Forever" | 3:21 |
| 4. | "You Ancient" | 3:58 |
| 5. | "Take My Will" | 8:24 |
| 6. | "New Rendezvous" | 9:37 |
| 7. | "Your Visitor" | 8:16 |
| Total length: | | 44:12 |
