= Desk Trickery =

Studio album by Doldrums
- Released: December 13, 1999
- Recorded: 1997 – 1999 in Texas and Virginia
- Genre: Post-rock
- Length: 46:50
- Label: Kranky

Doldrums chronology
Acupuncture (1997)	Desk Trickery (1999)	Feng Shui (2000)

Professional ratings
Review scores
Source	Rating
AllMusic	4.5/5 stars
NME	6/10
Pitchfork Media	8.7/10

Desk Trickery is a studio album by Doldrums, released in 1999 by Kranky.

== Critical reception ==
The Chicago Tribune wrote that Doldrums "embrace playing for the fun of it, stretching out on extended improvisations that owe as much to the Grateful Dead and Balinese gamelan music as they do to Can and Popul Vuh."

== Track listing ==
All music is composed by Doldrums.

No.	Title	Length
1.	"Office Scene"	0:45
2.	"Sparkling Deadheadz"	5:36
3.	"Fritland"	3:40
4.	"Grill Out Time"	8:04
5.	"Free Festival of the Stonebridge"	13:17
6.	"Who Shot J.R.?"	9:51
7.	"Godspeed You Young Actress"	5:36

== Personnel ==
Adapted from the Desk Trickery liner notes.

Doldrums

- Justin Chearno – guitar
- Bill Kellum – bass guitar
- Matt Kellum – drums

Production and additional personnel

- Sean Halleck – engineering

== Release history ==
Region	Date	Label	Format	Catalog
United States	1999	Kranky	CD	krank 040
