= Future Pilot A.K.A. =

- Born: Sushil K. Dade
- Origin: Glasgow, Scotland
- Genres: Indie
- Label: Creeping Bent

Future Pilot A.K.A. is the pseudonym of Glasgow indie musician Sushil K. Dade. Dade is a former member of the Soup Dragons, BMX Bandits and Telstar Ponies. Future Pilot's music blends classic indie pop with Indian classical, dub and hip hop influences.

== Discography ==
Dade has released four albums under the Future Pilot name on a variety of record labels, including Stephen Pastel's Geographic and most recently, Creeping Bent. The Future Pilot project is particularly noted for its vast range of collaborators and guest contributions from figures as diverse as composer Philip Glass, writer Alasdair Gray, Thurston Moore and Kim Gordon of Sonic Youth, Karine Polwart, Can's Damo Suzuki and members of the Glasgow indie scene, including Stuart Murdoch and Teenage Fanclub.

=== Albums ===
- Vs A Galaxy of Sound (1999) (Sulphur)
- Tiny Waves, Mighty Sea (2001) (Geographic)
- Salute Your Soul (2004) (Geographic)
- Secrets From the Clockhouse (2007) (Creeping Bent)
- Orkestra Digitalis 2019

== Personal life ==
Having previously worked as a driving instructor, Dade is a musician/producer living on the West Coast in Argyll & Bute

== Other projects ==
Between 2006 and 2012 Dade was a member of genre-crossing collective The Burns Unit along with others including Emma Pollock, Chris Difford, King Creosote and Karine Polwart. The supergroup released their debut album in 2009.
