= No Doctors =

American rock band 1998–2008

- Origin: Minnetonka, Minnesota, United States
- Genres: Experimental rock, art rock, avant-garde
- Years active: 1998–2008
- Labels: Freedom From GoJohnnyGo, Cock of the Rock, No Sides, Yik Yak, Not Not Fun

No Doctors was an American rock band based out of California's San Francisco Bay Area. Their music drew from a wide range of styles and traditions, most prominently noise, punk, blues, metal, and jazz. Members included guitarist Elvis S. deMorrow, Chauncey Chaumpers on guitar, Mr. Brians on drums, Mr. Clopez on drums, and CansaFis Foote on saxophone, with vocal duties distributed amongst its members in a socialist-collectivist fashion.

== History ==
Chauncey Chaumpers, CansaFis Foote, and Elvis deMorrow began creating music together in Minnetonka, Minnesota in 1998. A cast of revolving sidemen were to come in and out of the band throughout their early career. Prior to playing as No Doctors, Foote and Chaumpers had created experimental noise recordings for the purpose of psychic investigation, while deMorrow had distributed cassette works under the names of "Peyote Tax Return" and "F*ck Your Yankee Bluejeans," created together with an artist now known solely as "Devilman" (RIP).

Still teenagers, the boys began playing sporadic live shows around Minneapolis-St. Paul, inspired by much of the underground noise scene as documented by local record labels E.F. Tapes, Destijl, Fusetron, and the local fanzine Muckraker.

They were soon approached by CEO Matthew St-Germaine with the idea of assisting with a record label, called Freedom From. Much of their early years as a band were influenced heavily by the diverse and radical roster of artists that was quickly cultivated. The Argentine avant-space trio Reynols was to have an exceptional influence on philosophy when the boys accompanied the band on their first American tour, where they explored Minecxio and the role of the No-Mind.

In 2000, No Doctors moved to Chicago to begin work on their debut album. The band expanded into a consistent sextet, with the additions of Mr Brians on drums, Patrick Fogarty on bass, and W Cłøpŝkí on subtle whispers. Numerous other sidemen appeared as well, including Kevekev. Several distinct copies of the album were initially circulated, as noted by critic Liz Armstrong of the Chicago Reader. The album's integration of Minnesotan völk-noise inflections into rock's idiom curried little favor from elite urban critics, but secured the band's place in the American noise underground.

No Doctors' second record, Hunting Season, was scheduled to be engineered by David N. Feldman, who handled the first album, but Feldman was under contract with R. Kelly and unavailable. Instead the record was recorded at Tarantula Hill in Baltimore with the assistance of Twig Harper and Carly Ptak (Nautical Almanac), and Chiara Giovando (Black Elf Speaks, Black Coitus Family, Harrias, Motörhead). The album was a move away from the dada influences of the first album toward a greater connection with punk rock and heavy metal. Critics repeatedly compared the work to the Velvet Underground, Pussy Galore, and Royal Trux, and Amir Karim Nezar wrote, "No Doctors are the living incarnations of Satan".

ERP Saints followed in 2004 as a tribute to the East Rogers Park neighborhood of Chicago. This session saw the band stripped down to a quartet. Critics such as Larry Dolman and Matt Weir praised the effort for its clarity and noted a definitive shift in aesthetics: a turning to the light.

In late 2004 No Doctors relocated to the Bay Area, where they shared a practice space with friends Deerhoof and Kreamy 'Lectric Santa, frequently played live shows in the Bay area, and embarked on a California-only tour in October–November 2006 entitled "US Out of CA." They also released several tracks through compilations and a seven-inch, T-Bone (Pts 1 & 2), and released their third full-length album, Origin & Tectonics in June 2007. No Doctors officially disbanded during the liquidity crises of late 2008.

== Former members ==
- Patlock Fogarty - bass guitar (S/T, HUNTING SEASON, FFYOU)
- Norway "Skunk" Pedersen - percussion (pre-S/T)
- Baron Bonn von Mudski McMots - drums (pre-Norway "Skunk" Pedersen; post-Spinal Tap)
- MastaMillions - trumpet (S/T)
- Ab'Gayle - bass guitar (S/T)
- Martine Wendle - percussion (pre-ORIGIN AND TECTONICS)
- Kevan Harris - bass guitar (Milwaukee, WI: Dillo Day 2003)
- Eli "Geometry" Jones - bass guitar (2008)

== Discography ==
- 2002 – No Doctors CD/LP Freedom From
- 2003 – Hunting Season CD/LP Go Johnny Go / Cock of the Rock
- 2004 – ERP Saints CD No Sides
- 2004 – FF You Cassette Freedom From
- 2005 – T-Bone Parts 1 & 2 seven-inch Yik Yak
- 2007 – Origin & Tectonics CD/LP (self-released)
- 2008 – bootleg (unknown)
