= Khartoum (album) =

Studio album by Jandek
- Released: October 2005
- Recorded: 2005
- Length: 51:37
- Label: Corwood Industries
- Producer: Jandek

Jandek chronology
Raining Down Diamonds (2005)	Khartoum (2005)	Khartoum Variations (2006)

Professional ratings
Review scores
Source	Rating
Allmusic	2.5/5 stars

Khartoum is the forty-third album by Jandek. The album was released by Corwood Industries in 2005. The album features the Corwood Representative on solo vocals and acoustic guitar.

== Track listing ==
No.	Title	Length
1.	"You Wanted To Leave"	6:36
2.	"Fragmentation"	5:53
3.	"I Shot Myself"	4:44
4.	"New Dimension"	5:16
5.	"Khartoum"	9:43
6.	"In A Chair I Stare"	5:50
7.	"Move From The Mountain"	7:55
8.	"Fork In The Road"	5:40
Total length:		51:37

== See also ==
- Corwood Industries discography
