= Verity Spott =

English poet

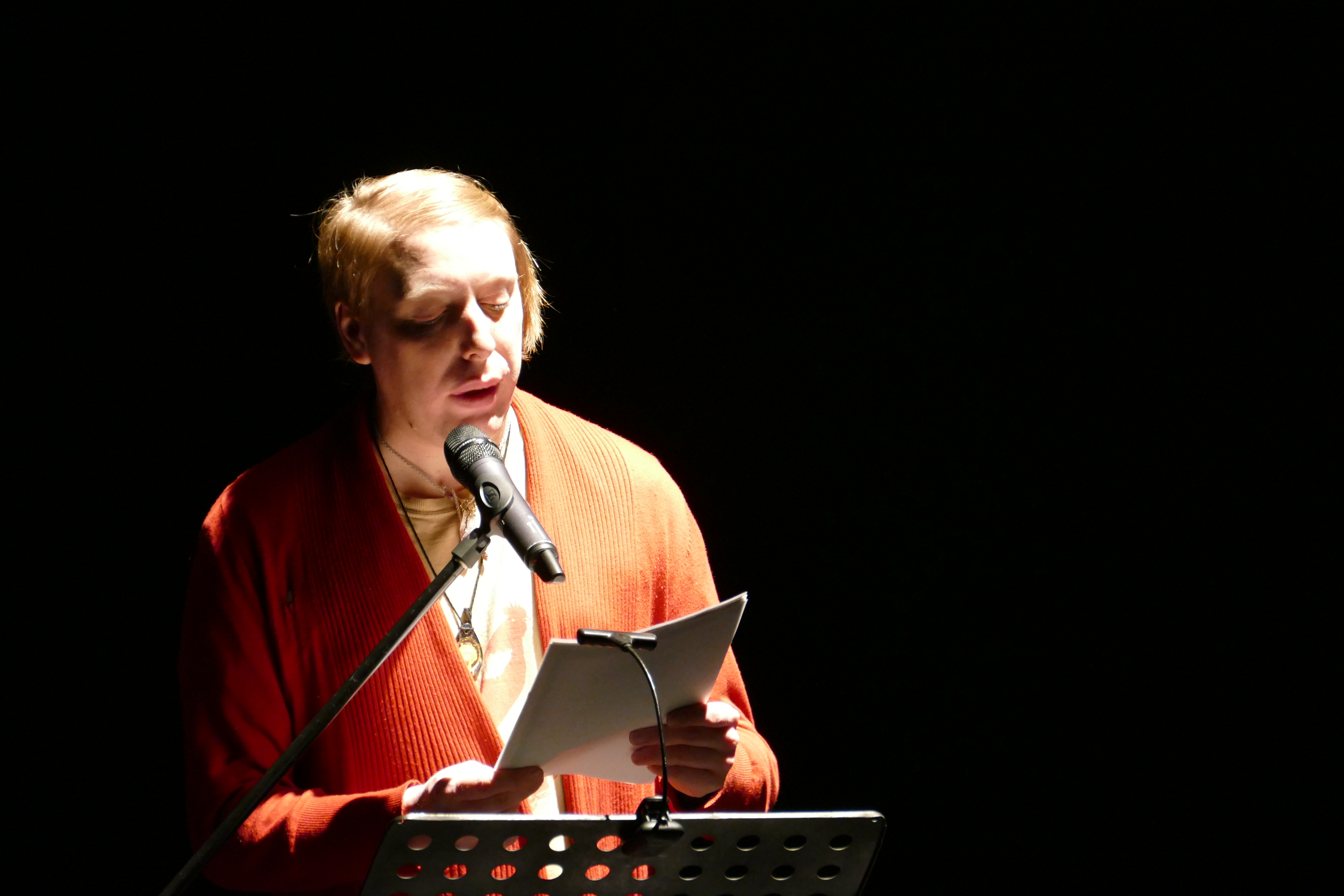
- Verity Spott at the closing event of Fokus Lyrik 2019
- Born: 1987 (age 38–39); Manchester
- Education: University of Sussex
- Occupation: Poet

Verity Spott (born in 1987) is an English neo-modernist poet. Spott was born and raised in Yorkshire, and moved to Brighton in 2006. Since then Spott has been teaching poetry in local institutions, as well as co-running a monthly poetry and musical performance event called "Horseplay".

Spott is an alumnus of the University of Sussex.

== Reception ==
Spott's work has been described in the New York Times as, "mesmerizing, oneiric, enchanted, with language that surprises". An analysis of their poetry in the Chicago Review alludes to critical correlations between political situations and escapism, calling in to question the "very binaries of political engagement and escapist withdrawal, the idea that hope is the foundation for action...and the relationship between imagined actions and real ones." Spott's work has been discussed in the Cordite Poetry Review, and critiqued in the book, Wound Building: Dispatches from the Latest Disasters in UK Poetry, among other publications. One of Spott's poems, "from Coronelles – Set 2", is included in 100 Queer Poems, which The Guardian described as 2022's "most notable anthology".

== Selected works ==
- Three Poems. (Broadside) London: Sender Broken, 2013.
- Effort to No. Brighton: Iodine, 2013.
- (with Jonny Liron) Dear Nothing and No One in It. Brighton: Iodine, 2013.
- Gideon. London: Barque Press, 2014.
- (with Megan Alan) Three Poems, Edinburgh Sad Press, 2014.
- Balconette. Guildford: Veer Books, 2014. ISBN 978-1-907088-73-5
- 9 11 16. Brighton: Iodine, 2016.
- Trans* Manifestos, 2016.
- We Will Bury You. Guildford: Veer Books, 2017. ISBN 978-1-911567-00-4
- Click Away Close Door Say. Contraband Books, 2017. ISBN 978-1-910319-06-2
- Kate's Dream Diamond Anti Fatigue Matting Surface. Crater, 2017.
- (with Timothy Thornton) Poems. Face Press, 2017.
- The Mutiny Aboard the RV Felicity. Tipped Press, 2018.
- Prayers, Manifestos, Bravery. London: Pilot Press, 2018.
- Caterpillars. TL:DR Press, 2019.
- Poems of Sappho. Face Press, 2019.
- Prayers, Manifestos, Bravery. London: Pilot Press, (second edition), 2020.
- Hopelessness. London: The 87 Press, 2020. ISBN 978-1-9164774-9-0
- Coronelles Set 1. London: Veer Books, 2020.
- 70 Sonnets. Brighton: Hove Space Program, 2021.
- Désolation (French translation of Hopelessness). Lyon, Même pas l'hiver, 2022.
- Woodvale (written collaboratively by "The Beam-Eye Babies"). Brighton, The Minutes Press, 2022.
- Songs of the Morning. London: Slub Press, 2023.
- The North Road Songbook. London: Pilot Press, 2024.
- Went to Get the Sink Unblocker. Philadelphia: Eternal Sections, 2025.
- What If You Were The One Being Used As Equipment. Brighton, Ice Gresp Press, 2025.
- Postcards from Berlin. Brighton: Nothing Much Press, 2026.
- Postcards from Crete. Brighton: Nothing Much Press, 2026.
- Good Morning. London: Pilot Press, 2026.
