= Newcastle Sunday =

Live album by Jandek
- Released: February 2006
- Recorded: 22 May 2005
- Length: 84:33
- Label: Corwood Industries
- Producer: Jandek

Jandek chronology
Khartoum Variations (2006)	Newcastle Sunday (2006)	What Else Does The Time Mean? (2006)

Professional ratings
Review scores
Source	Rating
Allmusic	link

Newcastle Sunday is the 45th release by avant- folk/blues singer-songwriter Jandek, released by Corwood Industries. It is a recording of his second ever live performance, recorded at The Sage Gateshead, England.

Like 2005's Glasgow Sunday, Newcastle Sunday features the Corwood Representative on vocals and guitar along with bassist Richard Youngs and drummer Alex Neilson, although neither sideman is credited on the album's cover. It is also notable for being Corwood Industries' first-ever double-CD release.

== Track listing ==
=== Disc one ===
No.	Title	Length
1.	"Depression"	8:11
2.	"Other End of Town"	5:26
3.	"Every Morning"	6:59
4.	"All of a Sudden"	6:57
5.	"Locked Up"	4:33
6.	"Put It Up"	6:08
7.	"Mangled and Dead"	6:11
Total length:		44:25

=== Disc two ===
No.	Title	Length
1.	"Some Other Name"	6:20
2.	"Telephone Blues"	7:08
3.	"Cottage in the Rain"	6:35
4.	"Sheba Doesn't Have"	8:48
5.	"Shadow of the Clouds"	11:17
Total length:		40:08

== See also ==
- Corwood Industries discography
