= Khartoum Variations =

Studio album by Jandek
- Released: January 2006
- Recorded: 2005
- Length: 49:17
- Label: Corwood Industries
- Producer: Jandek

Jandek chronology
Khartoum (2005)	Khartoum Variations (2006)	Newcastle Sunday (2006)

Professional ratings
Review scores
Source	Rating
Allmusic	2.5/5 stars

Khartoum Variations is the first of six releases in 2006 by singer-songwriter Jandek. Released by Corwood Industries, it is his 44th album overall. The recordings are alternate versions of seven of the eight songs from his previous album, Khartoum.

== Track listing ==
No.	Title	Length
1.	"You Wanted To Leave"	9:15
2.	"Fragmentation"	6:16
3.	"I Shot Myself"	6:42
4.	"New Dimension"	5:10
5.	"Khartoum"	8:14
6.	"In A Chair I Stare"	5:27
7.	"Move From The Mountain"	8:13
Total length:		49:17

== See also ==
- Corwood Industries discography
