= Matthew Bower =

British musician

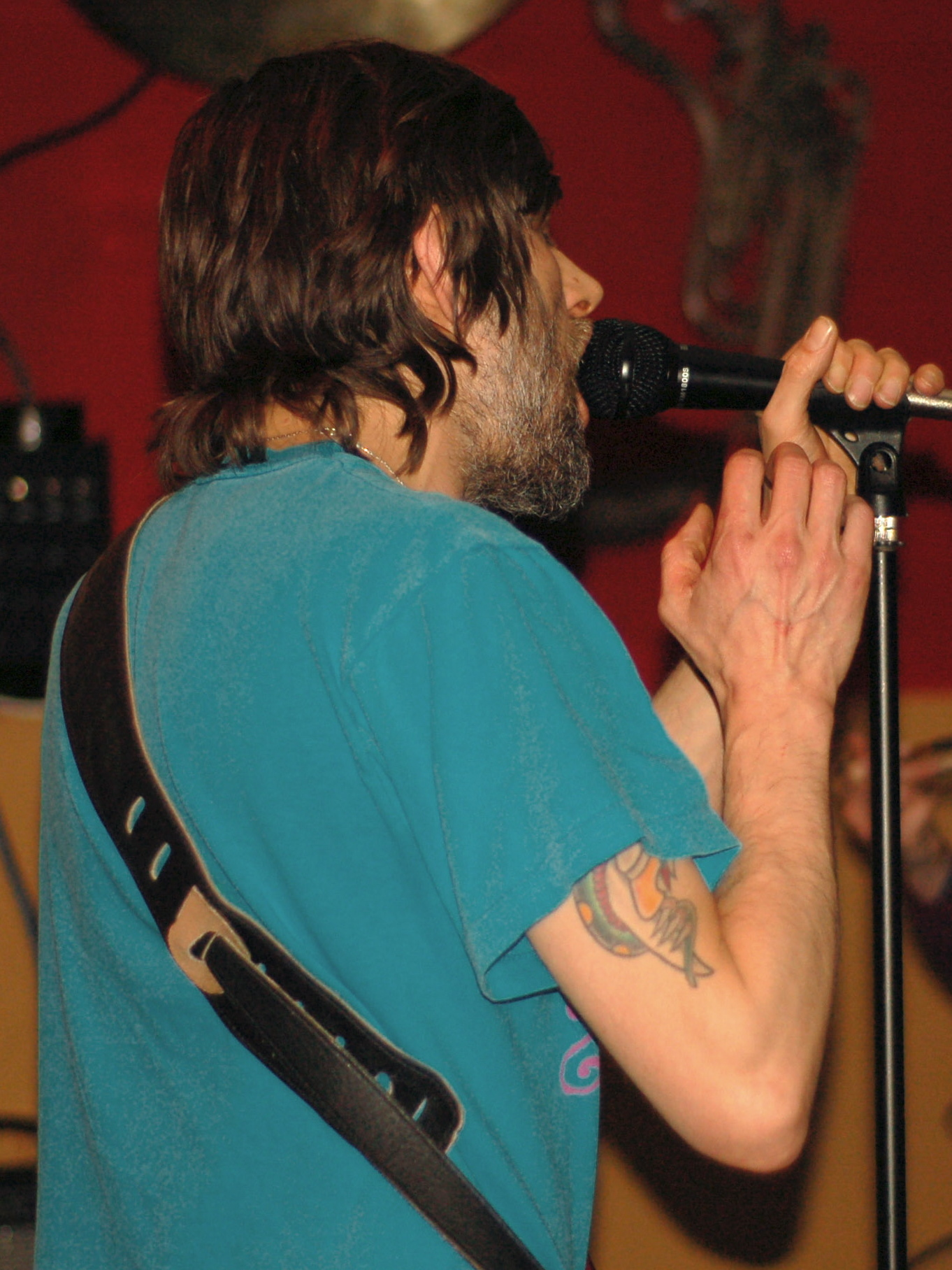
Matthew Bower in concert with Hototogisu

Matthew Bower is a British musician, active since the early 1980s, who has done both collaborative and solo work.

== Skullflower ==
Skullflower was formed when Bower joined up with Stefan Jaworzyn, Gary Mundy and Stuart Dennison in 1987 having previously worked under the name Pure with Alex Binnie and Alex Windsor. Unlike most of their immediate contemporaries in the London-based industrial underground, they used traditional rock instruments such as guitars and drums as well as tapes, synths etc. The line-up could be fluid, with members of contemporaries such as Whitehouse, Coil and Ramleh contributing. The group are often cited as having been a strong influence on Justin Broadrick of Godflesh and, indeed, Broadrick later released two Skullflower albums on his HeadDirt label. Jaworzyn left the band with bassist Anthony DiFranco and guitarist Russell Smith (formerly of Terminal Cheesecake) joining. The unit moved further and further away from any recognisable rock genre with albums such as Obsidian Shaking Codex and Transformer showcasing a free-flowing, rootless brand of drone music, often adding reeds and strings, sometimes played by John Godbert. Skullflower was put on hold around 1997 with Bower pursuing other activities, and triumphantly revived in 2003, with Bower enlisting people like Mark Burns, Neil Campbell, Michael Flower and Colin Potter (of Nurse With Wound) for new material. Although he recorded some of these albums (including Tribulation) alone, many of the group's live commitments were fulfilled by a duo of Bower and Lee Stokoe (who records solo as Culver). A show at the 2008 Colour Out Of Space festival saw Bower and Stokoe being joined by Alex Binnie and Stuart Dennison. At April 2009, the full line-up of Skullflower was Bower, Stokoe, Dennison and Samantha Davies. He and Samantha Davies also record together as Voltigeurs. 2011 saw the release of 'Fucked on a Pile of Corpses' more visceral/Black Metal/and an almost return to the industrial sounds of Total. Fittingly, it was released on long running English Industrial label Cold Spring. At the close of 2011 the full band line up is Bower, Sokoe, Davies and West Yorkshire Patriot, George Proctor (Mutant Ape).

== Total ==
Bower recorded under the name Total, from 1984-7, and then as a solo vehicle from 1991-2000, on labels such as Majora, VHF, American Tapes (run by John Olson of Wolf Eyes), Self Abuse and Freek as well as appearing on Virgin's Isolationism compilation. Initially a more drone/neo classical/industrial counterpart to Skullflower's harsher work, the roles slowly reversed, reaching a peak with the noisy Merzbow Mixed Total cassette being released around the same time as the mostly gentle, fluid "This Is Skullflower" CD. Bower coincidentally stopped using the name, adopting Sunroof! for his solo work, at the same time the US R&B group of the same name appeared; there was no connection between these events.

== Other projects ==
With Skullflower officially resting and Total retired, Bower began a more inclusive project called Sunroof! which, on occasion, could feature Richard Youngs, Neil Campbell, John Godbert, Phil Todd and other friends. More melodic and keyboard based than his previous work, albums were issued on VHF, Giardia and his own Rural Electrification Project label. In addition, he also guested with Vibracathedral Orchestra on a number of occasions and has issued 2 albums with Richard Youngs. Bower’s discography of visceral, free drone-rock is one of the most formidable of its kind and he was considered in 2005 by The Wire to be one of the "map co-ordinates for much of what passed for a post-punk UK underground during most of the 80s and 90s" (issue 259).
