= Ashtray Navigations =

- Origin: Stoke-On-Trent, England
- Genres: Psychedelic, noise, experimental rock, chillwave, avant garde, drone
- Years active: 1991–present
- Label: Memoirs of an Aesthete / Qbico / Absurd / Menlo Park / Last Visible Dog / Freedom From American Tapes / Celebrate Psi Phenomenon / Jewelled Antler Goldsoundz / Betley Welcomes Careful Drivers / Siltbreeze / Deep Water Acres
- Members: Phil Todd; Mel Ó Dubhshláine
- Past members: Ben Reynolds; Alex Neilson; Phil Legard; Big Mike; Chloe Jarvis; Evelyn Kharag
- Website: http://ashtraynavigations.wordpress.com

Ashtray Navigations is an English experimental music group centred upon Phil Todd and active since 1991. Colloquially referred to as "Ash Nav", the group operates out of Todd's home in Stoke-on-Trent, from which he also ran the record labels Betley Welcomes Careful Drivers and, subsequently, Memoirs of an Aesthete. The project has also released music through labels such as Siltbreeze, Jewelled Antler, American Tapes, Fargone Records, Menlo Park, E.F. Tapes and Freedom From.

Whilst the music evades easy categorisation due to variations in sound, approach and personnel, it often incorporates extended droning and lengthy guitar pieces. James Blackshaw described the Ashtray Navigations sound as "sub-aquatic synth bubble, busted-up cassette-tape hiss and distorted electric guitar hover that sounds like a mythical god banished from the realm of light and trying desperately to clamber his/her way out of a dark bottomless void where time itself stands still." The Wire's David Keenan has described Phil Todd/Ashtray Navigations as "a trashcan antidote to LaMonte Young."

Reviewing Todd's 36th album, The Love that Whirrs, critic Larry Dolman wrote "It's a pretty mammoth piece of work – almost 80 minutes of music spread out over six heavy tracks. They tend to start as intense sun-blinding drone-fields, but if you hold on tight for a minute or two and adjust yourself to these new conditions, you'll start to notice a wealth of detail, provided by a real band of ringers. Todd has Alex Neilson (Directing Hand, accompanist with some Jandek live performances) on shimmering, fracturing percussion and Ben Reynolds on raga-style guitar and banjo. (Also, one Melanie Delaney appears on one epic track, playing reeds & tapes.) Trash drone, free skiffle, new electric raga, sun blindness music, call it what you will, this is a powerful statement."

Although Todd still records solo, most recent Ashtray Navigations titles and live shows have been undertaken by a duo of Todd and Melanie Crowley or by a trio of Todd, Crowley and one other, often Phil Legard (Xenis Emputae Travelling Band) although the line-up has also been joined at one time or another by Alex Neilson, Bill Kouligas (Family Battle Snake) and Ruaraidh Sanachan (Nackt Insecten) – the latter two can be heard on "Backstage Education" a limited four-disc document of Ash Nav's 2007 summer tour.

Their discography is extensive, with many limited releases on cassette and CDR formats: albums with a wider distribution include Four Raga Moods (which was followed-up several years later by Four More Raga Moods), The Love that Whirrs, To Your Fucking Feather'd Wings, Dirt Mummies & Bloody Amps, You Cannot Tell Cigars.... and Use Copenhagen 69 Guitars and Park Drive Circular Effects Pedals Exclusively.

== Partial discography ==
- Who's Been Rocking My Dream-Boat? (cassette, 1996)- Less Than Zero
- Four Raga Moods (CD, 1997)- Betley Welcomes Careful Drivers
- Use Copenhagen 69 Guitars and Park Drive Circular Effects Pedals Exclusively (LP, 1997) – Siltbreeze
- End-of-the-Pier Vault (7", 2000) – Tonschact Records
- Plaster Projection Instruction Record (12", 2000) – Menlo Park Recordings
- Last Kiss Amateur Frequencies (7", 2002) – Gameboy Records
- Some Cat Lost in His Own Picture (7", 2004) – Memoirs of an Aesthete
- You Cannot Tell Cigars By the Picture on the Box (CD, 2004) – Celebrate Psi Phenomenon
- Blues Power Cake (CDr, 2005) – Memoirs of an Aesthete
- Deader Neptune Thunder Creating East (CD, 2005) – Memoirs of an Aesthete
- A Monument to the British Rock (CDr, 2006) – Memoirs of an Aesthete
- Strawberries and Ice (3-inch CDr, 2006) Memoirs of an Aesthete
- Dirt Mummies and Bloody Amps (CD, 2006) – Freenoise
- Four More Raga Moods (CD, 2006) – Ikuisuus Records
- Who's Been Rocking My Dream-Boat? (Cdr reissue of 1996 cassette, 2006) – Memoirs of an Aesthete
- Stranded in the Tea/Standing in the Tea -(cassette, 2006) Fargone Records
- Throw Up in the Sky/With Fine Clinking Magnets – (12-inch LP, 2007) Qbico Records
- Caeduceus and Black Sal (CDr, 2007) – Memoirs of an Aesthete
- Running on Autokinetic (CDr, 2007) – Memoirs of an Aesthete
- Those Are Pearls That Were His Eyes (CDr reissue, 2007) – Revival
- Throw Up in the Sky (12", 2007) – Qbico Records
- Greatest Imaginary Band (CDr, 2007) – Self-released
- Snakestrings / Hollywood Taught you How to Kiss (Double CDr, 2008) – Self-released
- The Cream Wheel (CDr, 2008) – Self-released
- Sugar Head Record (CDr, 2009) – Deep Water Acres
