= Glasgow Sunday =

Live album

Live album by Jandek
- Released: April 2005
- Recorded: October 17, 2004
- Length: 61:10
- Label: Corwood Industries
- Producer: Jandek

Jandek chronology
When I Took That Train (2005)	Glasgow Sunday (2005)	Raining Down Diamonds (2005)

Professional ratings
Review scores
Source	Rating
Allmusic	link

Glasgow Sunday is the second of four albums released in 2005 by musician Jandek on Corwood Industries, as (0779). His 41st overall, it was recorded live on October 17, 2004 at The Arches, Glasgow, as part of the Instal festival. This was the first known live appearance of Jandek, who played unannounced with backing from Richard Youngs on bass and Alex Neilson on drums.

A DVD of this performance was released on June 15, 2006. Like the original album (and all of Jandek's previous output), it was released by Corwood Industries and shares the same catalog number as the CD version, albeit with the suffix "DVD" attached (0779-DVD). It is Corwood's first ever home video release.

== Track listing ==
No.	Title	Length
1.	"Not Even Water"	10:24
2.	"Where I Stay"	7:29
3.	"Darkness You Give"	9:37
4.	"Sea Of Red"	7:50
5.	"Real Wild"	6:25
6.	"Don't Want To Be"	5:55
7.	"Blue Blue World"	6:42
8.	"The Other Side"	6:48
Total length:		61:10

== See also ==
- Corwood Industries discography
