= Volcanic Tongue =

Volcanic Tongue was a record shop, distribution company and record label located in Glasgow, Scotland. It specialised in underground music from the United Kingdom, United States, Europe, Australia, New Zealand and Japan. They described their remit as "free folk, psych, Japanese underground, noise, avant-garde, free jazz, blues, experimental, garage punk/DIY, minimal synth, drone, Industrial, sound poetry, prog, american primitive, private press, acid folk, classic 1960s/1970s rock, basement scum & assorted outsider modes". It was founded by David Keenan and Heather Leigh Murray in late 2004. Initially existing as a mail-order list and website, they operated their shop from February 2006 to January 2015.

Interviewed by Stylus in late 2005, Keenan described the rationale behind Volcanic Tongue's foundation as follows:

[T]he UK underground didn’t really have any focus or any point from which you could get underground music, nothing that really pulled all that stuff together. I wanted to combine the music I like from around the world with some of the UK underground stuff ... it felt right that we became a part of that, to help disseminate it.

They were unusual amongst retail and distribution outlets for being dictated by the personal taste of the founders rather than by market forces. Keenan explained that "it’s not just a record shop; we have a really tough filter and will not stock anything that we don’t like ... I don’t want to sell a copy of a record that I don’t want in my collection."

During its lifetime, the label expanded beyond small-run art editions of their own music (Scorces/Taurpis Tula/Heather Leigh Murray) to issue albums by Thurston Moore's Dream/Aktion Unit and Zaimph.
