= David Keenan =

Scottish writer and author

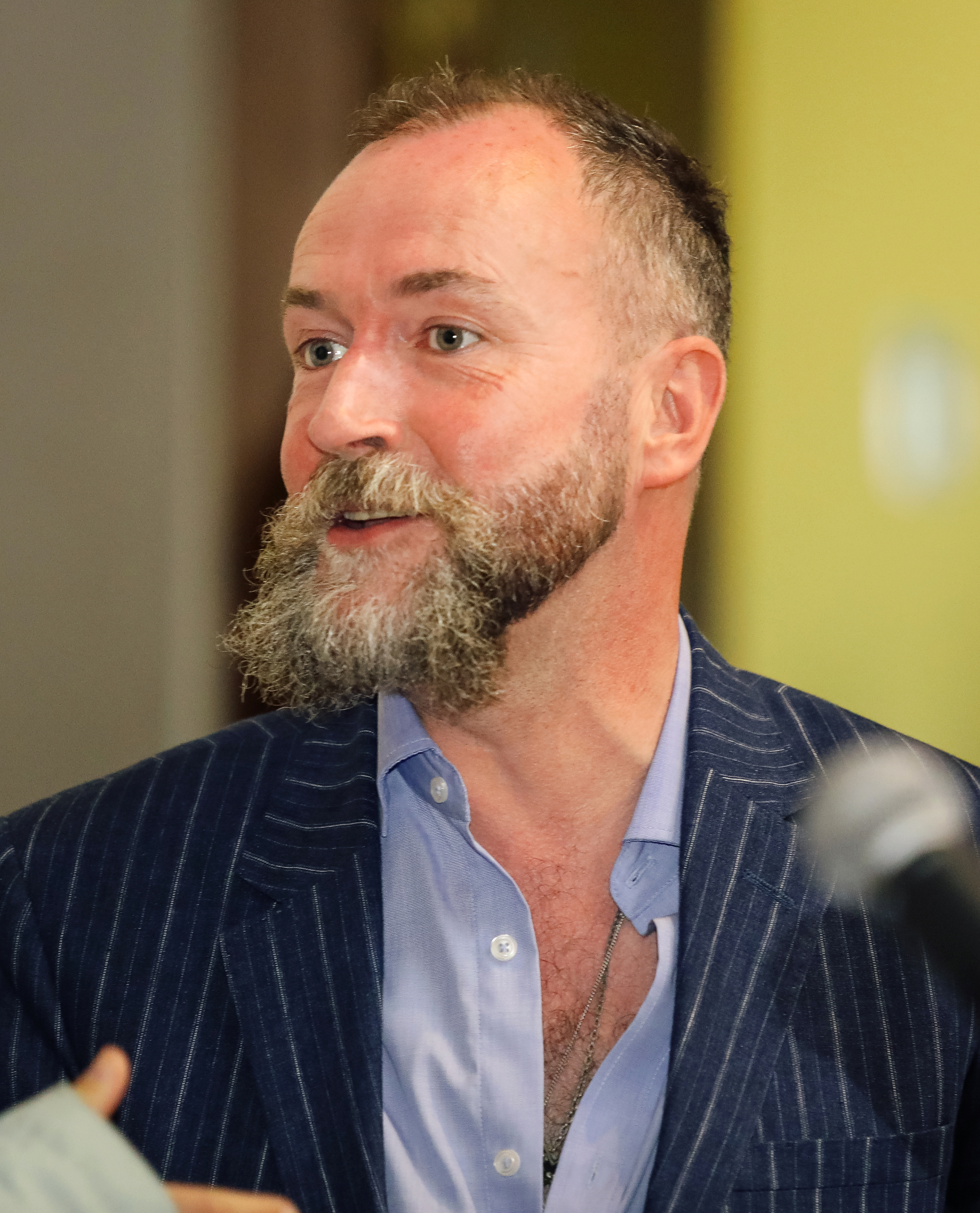
- Keenan in 2019
- Born: 21 April 1971 (age 55); Scotland
- Occupation: author
- Writing career
- Notable works: This Is Memorial Device, For the Good Times, Xstabeth, Monument Maker
- Notable awards: Gordon Burn Prize

David Keenan (born April 1971) is a Scottish writer and author of five novels.

== Career ==
He used to run the Glasgow record shop, distribution company and record label Volcanic Tongue.

=== Journalism ===
His work for The Wire (for whom he wrote from 1996 to 2015) was highly influential, helping to focus the magazine more towards coverage of new experimental rock, noise, folk, industrial and psychedelic music. His most frequently cited article is a cover story that appeared in the August 2003 issue entitled "New Weird America", where Keenan coined the phrase "free folk".

In an August 2009 piece for The Wire, Keenan coined "hypnagogic pop" to describe a group of musicians whose work resembled "pop music refracted through the memory of a memory". His article incited a slew of hate mail that derided hypnagogic pop as the "worst genre created by a journalist". Keenan became disenchanted with the movement once it homogenized with the mainstream.

A 2009 quote of Keenan cited by Karl Shaw, reproduced in his article in Wall Street Journal (Review, 24–25 Sept 2011), on The Beatles: "The Beatles are the absolute curse of modern Indie music...my favorite Beatle is Yoko Ono; without Yoko's influence, I don't think there would be any Beatles music I could listen to."

=== Novels ===
His debut novel, This Is Memorial Device (Faber, 2017), won the Collyer Bristow Award for Debut Fiction and was shortlisted for the 2017 Gordon Burn Prize. His second novel, For the Good Times (Faber, 2019), won the 2019 Gordon Burn Prize. Edna O'Brien described reading his third novel, Xstabeth (White Rabbit, 2020), as "feel[ing] like being cut open to the accompanying sound of ecstatic music". His fourth novel, Monument Maker, was published by White Rabbit in 2021.

He is also the author of England's Hidden Reverse, a biography of Coil, Current 93 and Nurse with Wound.

== Bibliography ==
- England's Hidden Reverse (2003)
- This Is Memorial Device (2017)
- For the Good Times (2019)
- Xstabeth (2020)
- Monument Maker (2021)
- Industry of Magic & Light (2022)
- Volcanic Tongue (2025)
- Boyhood (2026)
