= Dredd Foole =

Vocal improviser and songwriter based in New England

- Born: Dan Ireton; February, 1950; Camden, New Jersey
- Genres: Post-punk, Free-folk, Experimental, New Weird America
- Instruments: Vocals, guitar
- Years active: 1982–1994, 1999–present
- Labels: Religious Records, Homestead Records, PVC Records, Forced Exposure, Ecstatic Peace!, Family Vineyard, Time-Lag, Bo'Weavil, Feeding Tube

Dan Ireton (born February, 1950, in Camden, New Jersey), known professionally as Dredd Foole, is a vocal improviser and songwriter based in New England whose various collaborative backing bands have been known as The Din.

== Mission of Burma Din ==
In February, 1982, on Ireton's 32nd birthday, he entered a studio with Mission of Burma, resulting in Dredd Foole and the Din's debut, the two-song single Songs in Heat. The collaboration would continue in August 1982, with Dredd Foole and the Din's live debut, again featuring Mission of Burma as the backing band. Despite the dissolution of the initial Mission of Burma lineup in March 1983 due to Roger Miller's tinnitus, live performances with Mission of Burma as the Din would continue throughout the remainder of that year, culminating with a January 1984 show without Miller.

== Volcano Suns Din ==
Following the March 1983 dissolution of Mission of Burma, drummer Peter Prescott formed Volcano Suns. When Mission of Burma's involvement as the Din came to an end, the Volcano Suns replaced them, becoming Dredd Foole's backing band in time for June 2, 1984's show opening for Sonic Youth. The collaboration would prove lasting, producing two LPs, 1985's Eat My Dust, Cleanse My Soul on Homestead Records and 1988's Take Off Your Skin on PVC Records, and dozens of local live performances. Kenny Chambers, of Moving Targets, played guitar in the Din from 1983 to 1988, including both the Mission of Burma and the Volcano Suns eras.

Dredd Foole and the Din's live performances and recordings were regularly celebrated effusively in Forced Exposure, and came to be heavily associated with the widely distributed magazine. Reviewing a September 6, 1986 show at T.T. The Bear's, Forced Exposure creator Jimmy Johnson wrote:

"Fact is, with this gig and another the following week at the Rat, Dred [sic] made a firm bid for consideration as the best in-the-flesh band around, period. Forget any qualifiers. That good. ... Fucking immense. Other bands did play, but after this, who could care?"

== In Quest of Tense ==
In 1993, Dredd Foole recorded the solo In Quest of Tense, a home-recorded solo album of improvised psychedelic folk music that was released on Forced Exposure's label in 1994. The CD went largely unreviewed at the time of its release, and Dredd Foole went dormant until the late 90s and would not release another album until 2003. In Quest of Tense was later called "a classic" by Pitchfork, which noted that "most" of the New Weird America scene "were influenced by one particular record": In Quest of Tense. "That album is a mesmerizing collection of exploratory guitar, haunting vocals, and dark reverb, evoking the rituals of Velvet Underground associate Angus MacLise, the psych of early Pink Floyd, and the outsider art of Jandek."

== Brattleboro and Free Folk ==
Following a move to Brattleboro, Vermont, in 2000, Dredd Foole became widely active again and has collaborated and recorded with musicians including Matt Valentine, Chris Corsano, Thurston Moore, Jack Rose, Ben Chasny, Bill Nace, Paul Flaherty, Joshua, and Sunburned Hand of the Man. Many of these musicians lived in Connecticut, Massachusetts, and southern Vermont and would later have their activity dubbed New Weird America in The Wire in a cover article by David Keenan. Dredd Foole performed at the 2003 Brattleboro Free Folk Festival, a summit gathering for most of the musicians involved in the free folk community at the time, "where he was introduced on stage...as a vitally important link between the first wave of experimental folk and its new incarnation." In his article, Keenan wrote:

"Ask any of these musicians where the initial energising spark for the New Weird America came from and they'll point you right back to Dredd Foole's epochal 1994 solo album, In Quest of Tense. Alongside hermetic lone operatives like Jandek, Sun City Girls, and Loren MazzaCane Connors, Dredd Foole's freeform take on folk song loosened shackles across the country."

== Legacy ==
In Seasons They Change: The Story of Acid and Psychedelic Folk, Jeanette Leech wrote, "The ability to evoke a difficult listening experience through quiet, acoustic music was to become a hallmark of free folk. Its modern incarnation began with Dredd Foole."

Reviewing 2007's Daze on the Mounts, Pitchfork referred to Dredd Foole's "legendary status" as "Vermont's free-folk poet laureate."

Music writer Jim DeRogatis, referring Ireton's 1980s activity, has written that Dredd Foole is a "punk legend."

== Musical style ==
Vocals

Tiny Mix Tapes has written that Ireton's "voice – his most potent instrument – scrambles to the tremulous heights Tim Buckley reached in his most freaked albums, mutates into an atavistic proto-punk yowl (think Godz, Fugs, Stooges), and spills drops of Alan Wattsian philosophy (or, if you're less generous, pseudo-philosophy) on the carpet through a lysergic drawl." PopMatters refers to the vocals on Daze on the Mounts as a "strange sludge of voices, all speaking in rock 'n' roll tongues." Dredd Foole's vocals have been called "devolved oral emissions" and "wobbly marble-mouthisms" by Trouser Press and "often dirge-y but cathartic howls of pain and loneliness" by The Noise, with some reviewers drawing qualified comparisons in his approach to outsider musicians Legendary Stardust Cowboy, Wild Man Fisher, and Jandek. Kim Gordon (of Sonic Youth and Body/Head) has written that "Dan Ireton is not afraid to be ugly or beautiful. A voice like no other."

"On First Impression" Approach

Throughout all periods of Ireton's career he has deployed a "one rehearsal, one show" approach, a practice that extends to his backing bands and collaborators. The resultant improvisational style (if not the approach) has been picked up on by the media. The Wire has referred to the 1980s Din material as "free rock," and Ireton's output since the 1990s has been called "free folk."
