= New Weird America =

2000s music scene

- August 2003 issue 234 of British music magazine The Wire
- Other names: Freak folk
- Stylistic origins: Psychedelic folk; freak folk; folk rock; folk
- Cultural origins: 2000s, United States

Other topics
- Anti-folk; neofolk; avant-folk; free folk; indie folk; wyrd folk

New Weird America is a music scene that emerged in the early 2000s. The term was coined by writer David Keenan in the August 2003 issue of British music magazine The Wire as a play on Greil Marcus's phrase "Old Weird America" from his book Invisible Republic which referred to music ranging from Harry Smith's Anthology of American Folk Music to Bob Dylan. The movement is inspired by the folk music of the 1960s and 1970s, while encompassing psychedelic folk genres such as free folk and freak folk.

== Etymology ==
The term was coined by David Keenan in the issue 234 (August 2003) of The Wire, following the Brattleboro Free Folk Festival organized by Matt Valentine and Ron J. Schneiderman. It is a play on Greil Marcus's phrase "Old Weird America" as described in his book Invisible Republic, which deals with the lineage connecting the pre-World War II folk performers on Harry Smith's Anthology of American Folk Music to Bob Dylan and his milieu.

== History ==
=== Free folk ===
The Brattleboro Free Folk Festival was the summit gathering of the free folk scene that was largely centered in Massachusetts, Vermont, and Connecticut. The festival included Dredd Foole, Sunburned Hand of the Man, MV & EE, all members of Charalambides in different configurations, Jack Rose, Chris Corsano, Joshua, and Paul Flaherty — most of whom operated out of the Pioneer Valley area. The scene drew on a wide range of musical influences, which Keenan summed up as "acoustic roots to drone, ritualistic performance, Krautrock, ecstatic jazz, hillbilly mountain music, psychedelia, archival blues and folk sides, Country funk and more." Adding, "ask any of these musicians where the initial energising spark for the New Weird America came from and they'll point you right back to Dredd Foole's epochal 1994 solo album, In Quest of Tense."

In 2008, Pitchfork staffer Amanda Petrusich stated:

Free-folk is also heavily inﬂuenced by British folksingers from the latter half of the twentieth century, mirroring, however inadvertently, the exact origins of all American folk music, which itself was inspired by Celtic, Scottish, and English folk songs in the early 1800s. British bands and artists like Bert Jansch and Pentangle, Comus, Shirley Collins, the Incredible String Band, Donovan, Vashti Bunyan, Fairport Convention, Roy Harper, and loads of others peaked in Britain in the 1960s and '70s

This largely underground scene, which also incorporated musicians from outside the region, including Six Organs of Admittance and Charalambides, was generally referred to as "free folk", as named by Matt Valentine. Wrote Keenan:

Mostly based outside of the major US cities, disparate, culturally disenfranchised cells have begun to telegraph between each other, forming alliances via limited handmade releases and a vast subterranean network of samizdat publications, musician- and fan-run labels and distributors like Apostacy, Child of Microtones, Eclipse, Ecstatic Yod, Fusetron, Qbico, Seres, Siwa, Sound@One, Spirit of Orr, Time-Lag, U-Sound, Vhf and Wholly Other. This particular cottage industry came into existence initially out of necessity, as no one else would touch this music.

=== Freak Folk ===
A higher profile collection of American musicians emerged at roughly the same time as Keenan's article. Almost entirely unconnected from the Free Folk scene and supporting labels, this far more visible and commercially successful wave is commonly referred to as Freak Folk. With influences more primarily centered on psychedelic rock and folk groups of the 1960s and 1970s, including American performers Holy Modal Rounders and English and Scottish groups, such as Pentangle, Incredible String Band, Donovan and Comus, this wave was spearheaded by Devendra Banhart, Joanna Newsom, and Vetiver. Both scenes were widely referred to in the music press as "New Weird America."

== See also ==
- Psychedelic folk
- Anti-folk
