= The Curious City =

Studio album by Modey Lemon
- Released: August 2005
- Recorded: 2005
- Genre: Alternative rock
- Length: 54:20
- Label: Birdman Records, Mute Records

Modey Lemon chronology
Thunder + Lightning (2003)	The Curious City (2005)	Season Of Sweets (2008)

The Curious City is Modey Lemon's third album and was released in August 2005. The cover art was painted by Erick Jackson, former bassist for The Apes.

== Reception ==
AllMusic rated it, highlighted several tracks, writing that the "background of 'Fingers, Drains' warbles in heat and melting instrument noises, and Boyd's vocal on it is downright sultry". They also praised 'Sleep Walkers' as having the "most efficient music Modey Lemon's ever made; it sounds like a lost Golden Earring B-side with its throbbing bass and insistent drum clap".

In his review for Pitchfork, Jason Crock also pointed out several songs deserving of praise. He wrote that 'Bucket of Butterflies' moves from a "sludgy, lumbering opening riff into a lighter, melodic shuffle through strummed sparkling pop into a three-note Disney villain gallop onto a snarling chorus and adroitly back to square one to start again". He said "the ghostly organs" on the track 'In Another Land' "provide some of the album's most psych-rock moments". He also complimented the lyrics on 'In the Cemetery' as being "sung with clarity and restraint".

Canadian music critic Cam Linday wrote in Exclaim!, that the album is a "riff-driven blast of psychedelic freak-outs and power rock that never settles down in its desire to make rock'n'roll dangerous again ... the heaviness of the music relies on building irrepressible grooves to keep it from relaxing into a coma of straight-up rock".

Chris Pacifico wrote in Treble Magazine that the track 'Mr. Mercedes' is "like something from the salad days of Mudhoney" and 'Fingers, Drains' has the "voodoo feel and lyrical deliverance of a Dr. John track". He also referenced 'In the Cemetery' as a "psychedelically-laced tune" and noted that 'Trapped Rabbits' is a "mind-boggling abyss for 18 long minutes". German punk zine Ox-Fanzine said "their approach to the album is very idiosyncratic". They also opined that the track 'Trapped Rabbits' is a "reference to the cover art, which is in turn inspired by [the 1972 novel] Watership Down". They finished by saying the album was "not an overambitious art-rock-like scam, but the work of three people who take their band very seriously".

== Track listing ==
1. "Bucket Of Butterflies" - 3:37
2. "Sleep Walkers" - 3:55
3. "In Another Land" - 5:15
4. "Mr. Mercedes" - 3:15
5. "Fingers, Drains" - 5:17
6. "Red Lights" - 5:22
7. "In The Cemetery" - 4:17
8. "Mountain Mist" - 2:51
9. "Countries" - 4:16
10. "Trapped Rabbits" - 16:19

== Personnel ==
- Paul Quattrone - drums
- Phil Boyd - vocals, guitar and synthesizers
- Jason Kirker - bass guitar and keyboards
