= Elephant Micah and the Palmyra Palm =

Studio album by Elephant Micah
- Released: May 2004
- Genre: Lo-fi/indie
- Label: Time-Lag Records

Elephant Micah chronology
Elephant Micah, Your Dreams Are Feeding Back (2003)	Elephant Micah and the Palmyra Palm (2004)	Elephant Micah and the Loud Guitars (2004)

Elephant Micah and the Palmyra Palm is CD-R released by Elephant Micah. It contains material from the same sessions that would produce Elephant Micah and the Loud Guitars and Elephant Micah and the Agrarian Malaise. Released on Time-Lag Records in May, 2004.

Professional ratings
Review scores
Source	Rating
Allmusic	3.5/5 stars
Foxy Digitalis	7/10 stars

== Track listing ==
1. "The Paranoia"
2. "Daniel's Song"
3. "The Greatest Claim"
4. "Girls Are Homely"
5. "A Stylish Way"
6. "Technology"
7. "It's Music"
8. "The Poison"
9. "Fifteen or Five"
10. "Mercy On Us"
11. "(The Night I Dropped) My Plastic Amplifier"
12. "Be My Bright Light"
