= Howlin Rain =

American rock band

- Origin: Oakland, California, United States
- Genres: Psychedelic, Blues-rock
- Years active: 2004–present
- Labels: Birdman Records, American Recordings, Easy Sound Records, Three Lobed Records
- Members: Ethan Miller; Jeff McElroy; Dan Cervantes; Brian "Nucci" Cantrell
- Past members: (see below)
- Website: www.howlinrain.com

Howlin Rain is an American rock band based in Oakland, California, formed in 2004 by guitarist/singer Ethan Miller. Their most recent album The Dharma Wheel was released in 2021. Their sound has been described as "classically soulful" and "Unapologetically influenced by the strong but easygoing grooves of West Coast 1970s rock".

== History ==
Ethan Miller formed Howlin Rain in 2004 when he was still a member of Comets on Fire, as an outlet for his songwriting interests and the influence of life in the Lost Coast area of Northern California. The first incarnation of the band also included bassist Ian Gradek and drummer John Moloney (who later joined Sunburned Hand of the Man). The final Comets on Fire album was released in 2006, after which Miller dedicated himself to Howlin Rain full-time. The group has since featured a revolving line-up with Miller as the only constant member.

The self-titled album Howlin Rain was released in 2006, establishing a "psychedelic country/garage rock" sound, after which the band toured as the opening act for Queens of the Stone Age. In 2007, the band signed with Rick Rubin to American Recordings. Their second album Magnificent Fiend, featuring an expanded line-up, was released in 2008. This album was noted for featuring jam band elements, and was described as a "combination of psychedelia, blues, funk and classic 1970s arena rock." The EPs Wild Life and The Good Life followed.

Howlin Rain performed at All Tomorrow's Parties in England in 2010. Their third full-length album The Russian Wilds was released in 2012, featuring further experiments in blues rock and 1970s album-oriented rock. This was the band's final album with American Recordings, and Miller reformed the line-up once again. Miller then conceived an interconnected trilogy of albums, and the first installment Mansion Songs was released in 2015.

Miller formed his own label, Silver Current Records, which issued The Alligator Bride in 2018. That album introduced hard rock and R&B elements to the group's sound. The third album in the planned trilogy, The Dharma Wheel, was released in 2021.

On the 13th of November the album named Watermelon (label: Silver Current) was released. This is a covers album and features guest appearances by David Nance Chris Robinson and Ty Segall.

== Members ==
=== Current members ===
- Ethan Miller – vocals, guitar (2004–present)
- Justin Smith – drums (2018–present)
- Jason Soda – guitar (2021–present)
- Kyre Wilcox – bass (2021–present)

=== Past members ===
- Ian Gradek – bass (2004–2009)
- John Moloney – drums (2004–2006)
- Joel Robinow – keyboards, horns, guitar, piano, organ (2007–2012)
- Mike Jackson – rhythm guitar (2008–2009)
- Garett Goddard – drums (2008–2009)
- Cyrus Comiskey – bass (2010–2015)
- Raj Kumar Ojha – drums (2010–2012)
- Isaiah Mitchell – guitar (2010–2012)
- Dan Cervantes – guitar (2014–2021)
- Jeff McElroy – bass, guitar (2014–2021)
- Brian "Nucci" Cantrell – drums (2014–2015)

=== Studio guests ===
- Ben Chasny – guitar (2007)
- Utrillo Kushner – drums (2007)
- Eli Eckert – guitar, bass (2008, 2012)
- John Gnorski – guitar (2015)
- Noel Harmonson – guitar, drums (2015)
- Charlie Saufley – guitar, bass (2015)
- Meg Baird – drums, guitar, backing vocals (2015)
- Richard Danielson – drums (2018)
- Chris Robinson – vocals (2022)

== Discography ==
=== Albums ===
- Howlin Rain (2006)
- Magnificent Fiend (2008)
- Wild Life (EP, 2008)
- The Good Life (EP, 2010)
- The Russian Wilds (2012)
- Live Rain (live, 2014)
- Mansion Songs (2015)
- The Alligator Bride (2018)
- The Dharma Wheel (2021)
- Watermelon (2026)
