= Thunder + Lightning =

Studio album by Modey Lemon
- Released: 2003
- Recorded: 2003
- Genre: Alternative rock
- Length: 34:06
- Label: Birdman Records US Mute Records EU EMI Japan
- Producer: Jason Kirker

Modey Lemon chronology
Modey Lemon (2002)	Thunder + Lightning (2003)	The Curious City (2005)

Thunder + Lightning is American band Modey Lemon's second album. It was the last album to be recorded without Jason Kirker in the band as he was asked to join shortly after he produced this album.

== Track listing ==
1. "Crows" – 2:48
2. "Thunder + Lightning" – 1:46
3. "Enemy" – 3:35
4. "Predator" – 4:18
5. "Electronic Sorcerer" – 1:58
6. "Tongues (Everybody's Got One)" – 3:43
7. "Ants in My Hands" – 3:05
8. "Slow Death" – 3:24
9. "The Other Direction" – 3:19
10. "Gemini Twins" – 4:13
11. "The Guest" – 2:12

== Personnel ==
- Paul Quattrone – Drums
- Phil Boyd – Vocals, guitar and Moog synthesizer
