= Shelter from the Ash =

Studio album by Six Organs of Admittance
- Released: November 20, 2007
- Genre: Experimental rock
- Length: 43:03
- Label: Drag City

Six Organs of Admittance chronology
The Sun Awakens (2006)	Shelter from the Ash (2007)	Luminous Night (2009)

Professional ratings
Review scores
Source	Rating
The Guardian	2/5 stars
NME	6/10 stars
Pitchfork Media	4.9/10
PopMatters	7/10
Uncut	4/5 stars

Shelter from the Ash is the tenth album by experimental indie rock band, Six Organs of Admittance, released on November 20, 2007. It continues the progression begun on School of the Flower, from experimental acoustic pieces, toward more standard rock song structures.

== Track listing ==
1. "Alone with the Alone" – 4:15
2. "Strangled Road" – 5:34
3. "Jade Like Wine" – 4:11
4. "Coming to Get You" – 7:28
5. "Goddess Atonement" – 6:01
6. "Final Wing" – 8:35
7. "Shelter from the Ash" – 3:24
8. "Goodnight" – 3:36
