= Self-made man (disambiguation) =

A self-made man is a poor man who becomes successful through hard work.

Self-Made Man or Self Made Man may also refer to:

- Self-Made Man (book), an autobiographical book by Norah Vincent
- "Self Made Man" (Terminator: The Sarah Connor Chronicles), an episode of the American television series Terminator: The Sarah Connor Chronicles
- A Self-Made Man (film), a 1922 American silent comedy drama film starring William Russell
- Self Made Man (album), an album by Larkin Poe

== Music ==
- Self Made Man (song), a song by Montgomery Gentry, from the 1999 album Tattoos & Scars
- "Self Made Man", a 1970 song by Ersel Hickey
- "Self Made Man", a song by Morcheeba, from the 2010 album Blood Like Lemonade
- "Self Made Man", a song by Howlin Rain, from the 2012 album The Russian Wilds
- "Self Made Man", a song by John Hartford, from 2002 reissue of the album Iron Mountain Depot
