= Elephant Micah, Your Dreams Are Feeding Back =

Studio album by Elephant Micah
- Released: June 2003
- Recorded: Richmond, Indiana
- Genre: Lo-fi/indie
- Label: BlueSanct Records

Elephant Micah chronology
The Untied States of Elephant Micah (2002)	Elephant Micah, Your Dreams Are Feeding Back (2003)	Elephant Micah and the Palmyra Palm (2004)

"Elephant Micah, Your Dreams Are Feeding Back" is an album by Indiana lo-fi/indie Joe O'Connell, better known as Elephant Micah. It was released in June, 2003 on BlueSanct Records.

Professional ratings
Review scores
Source	Rating
Allmusic	3/5 stars
Foxy Digitalis	8/10 stars
Sponic Zine	3.5/5 stars

== Track listing ==
1. "zzzzzzz..."
2. "Turned Up to Stardom"
3. "Rhode Island Reds"
4. " $$$$$..."
5. "Deliver Us From Broken Glass"
6. "TV-Like Slow Motion"
7. "Duet for Mower and Chainsaw"
8. "O Vocabulary"
9. "Immune to Amusement"
10. "Early Instrumental"
11. "Remember The M Year"
12. "Where Do Songs?"
13. "Mt. Neil Young"
14. "Rapid Eyesight"
15. "Flannery's Frizzled Chicken"
16. "O Vocabulary"
17. "Cuba and the Movie Ad"
18. "Late Instrumental"
