= Fire escape (disambiguation) =

A fire escape is a structure to allow emergency exits from buildings. It may also refer to:

- Fire Escape, a 2007 album by Sunburned Hand of the Man
- Fire Escape, a 1987 book from The Railway Series
- "Fire Escape", a 1998 song by Fastball
- "Fire Escape", a 2019 song by Miranda Lambert
- "Fire Escape", a 2022 song by Beach Bunny
