= Avatar (Comets on Fire album) =

Studio album by Comets on Fire
- Released: August 8, 2006
- Recorded: January–April 2006
- Genre: Psychedelic rock, indie rock
- Length: 44:46
- Label: Sub Pop

Comets on Fire chronology
| Blue Cathedral (2004) | Avatar (2006) |

Professional ratings
Aggregate scores
| Source | Rating |
|---|---|
| Metacritic | 81/100 |
Review scores
| Source | Rating |
| AllMusic | 4/5 stars |
| Alternative Press | 5/5 stars |
| Blender | 4/5 stars |
| Drowned in Sound | 9/10 |
| Mojo | 4/5 stars |
| Pitchfork | 7.7/10 |
| Q | 4/5 stars |
| Slant Magazine | 3.5/5 stars |
| Tiny Mix Tapes | 4/5 stars |
| Uncut | 8/10 |

Avatar is a studio album by the indie rock band Comets on Fire. It was released in 2006 on Sub Pop.

== Track listing ==
All music by Comets on Fire; lyrics by Ethan Miller (1, 2, 4, 5) and Utrillo Kushner (3, 7)

1. "Dogwood Rust" – 7:48
2. "Jaybird" – 6:08
3. "Lucifer's Memory" – 7:03
4. "The Swallow's Eye" – 6:53
5. "Holy Teeth" – 2:59
6. "Sour Smoke" – 8:47
7. "Hatched Upon the Age" – 6:08

== Personnel ==
Comets on Fire

- Ethan Miller – vocals (except 6), electric guitar
- Ben Chasny – electric guitar, baritone guitar, acoustic guitar
- Ben Flashman – bass, baritone guitar, Hammond organ
- Noel Von Harmonson – echo electronics, drums (3, 6, 7), Hammond organ
- Utrillo Kushner – drums (1, 2, 4, 5), piano (3, 6, 7)

Additional personnel

- Tim Green – recording engineer
- JJ Goldern – mastering
- Jeff Kleinsmith – album art and layout
