= Howlin Rain (album) =

Studio album by Howlin Rain
- Released: June 26, 2006
- Recorded: 2005
- Genre: Rock
- Length: 49:16
- Label: Birdman

Howlin Rain chronology
| Howlin Rain (2006) | Magnificent Fiend (2008) |

Professional ratings
Review scores
| Source | Rating |
|---|---|
| Allmusic | link |
| Pitchfork Media | 7.1/10 link |

Howlin Rain is the debut album by Howlin Rain. It was released in 2006 on the Birdman Records label.

== Track listing ==
1. "Death Prayer in Heaven's Orchard" – 4:03
2. "Calling Lightning with a Scythe" – 6:15
3. "Roll on the Rusted Days" – 5:51
4. "The Hanging Heart" – 9:11
5. "Show Business" – 3:10
6. "Indians, Whores and Spanish Men of God" – 6:27
7. "In Sand and Dirt" – 5:53
8. "The Firing of the Midnight Rain" – 9:46

== Personnel ==
Howlin Rain

- Ethan Miller – vocals, electric and acoustic guitars, piano, synthesizer
- Ian Gradek – bass, banjo, vocals
- John Moloney – drums, percussion, vocals

Additional personnel

- Tim Green – synthesizer (1), keyboards (4), producer, recording engineer
- Tim Daly – saxophone (2, 3, 5, 6)
- Colin Gradek – backing vocals (3)
- John Golden – mastering
- Arik Roper – jacket artwork
