= Wedlock (album) =

Studio album by Sunburned Hand of the Man
- Released: 2005
- Recorded: 21 June 2003
- Genre: Psychedelic folk
- Label: Eclipse

Professional ratings
Review scores
Source	Rating
Pitchfork Media	7.5/10 link

Wedlock is a double album by Massachusetts band Sunburned Hand of the Man, released on the Eclipse Records label in 2005. The album consists of recordings the band made during their trip from the Brattleboro Free Folk Festival to Alaska and during the wedding of band members Paul LaBrecque and Valerie Webb on 21 June 2003, from which the album derives its title.

== Track listing ==
Side A

1. Procession (feat. The Other Methodist)
2. The Tent City Roller

Side B

1. Wedlock

Side C

1. Sunshine Suit
2. The Agency

Side D

1. Double Invisibility
2. Salmon Sez

== Credits ==
- Dave Bohill - keys, drums, voices, oboe
- Chad Cooper - electronics, oboe, vocals
- Chris Corsano - viola, guitar, voice
- Critter - hand drums, voice
- Phil Franklin - drums, guitar
- Paul LaBrecque - banjo, voice
- Marc Orleans - vocals, dobro, drums
- Rich Pontius - percussion
- Rob Thomas - bass, Q-Tron, vocals
- Ron Schneiderman - viola, guitar, bass
- Christine Steele - drums, voice
- Valerie Webb - vocals, winds
- Agent Z & Agent W - drums
- Lisa from Seattle - piano
- Dave Bird - Telling it like it is
