= Season of Sweets =

Studio album by Modey Lemon
- Released: May 12, 2008
- Recorded: 2008
- Genre: Alternative rock
- Length: 47:20
- Label: Birdman Records

Modey Lemon chronology
The Curious City (2005)	Season of Sweets (2008)

Season Of Sweets is Modey Lemon's fourth album. The band embarked on a tour to promote the album shortly after its release.

== Track listing ==
1. "The Bear Comes Back Down the Mountain" - 5:21
2. "The Peacock's Eye" - 5:29
3. "It Made You Dumb" - 3:49
4. "Sacred Place" - 4:48
5. "Become A Monk" - 4:19
6. "Ice Fields" - 7:10
7. "Milk Moustache" - 3:09
8. "Season Of Sweets" - 2:54
9. "Live Like Kids" - 10:27

== Personnel ==
- Paul Quattrone - Drums
- Phil Boyd - Vocals, guitar and synthesizers
- Jason Kirker - Bass and keyboards
