= Heavy breath =

Heavy breath may refer to:

- Breathing heavily (deep/fast/hard)
- A symptom possibly indicating the presence of a disease or abnormality
- "Heavy Breath", a song from the 2009 indie rock album Curse Your Branches by David Bazan
- Heavy breath play, an erotic fetish

Heavy breathing may refer to:

- Heavy Breathing, a character in the late 1960s/early 1970s British sitcom The Dustbinmen
- Heavy Breathing: Poems, 1967-1980, a book by Philip Whalen
- "Heavy Breathing", a song from the emo pop punk post-hardcore album Resolution by Hidden in Plain View
- "Heavy Breathing", a song from the 1974 pop rock album Mr. Natural by the Bee Gees
- Heavy Breathing, Washington D.C. dance/noise rock band established in 2010

== See also ==
- Heavy (disambiguation)
- Breath (disambiguation)
