= Magnificent Fiend =

Studio album by Howlin Rain
- Released: March 4, 2008
- Recorded: 2007
- Genre: Rock
- Length: 43:25
- Label: Birdman

Howlin Rain chronology
Howlin' Rain (2006)	Magnificent Fiend (2008)	Wild Life (2008)

Professional ratings
Aggregate scores
Source	Rating
Metacritic	75
Review scores
Source	Rating
Allmusic	4/5 stars
Drowned in Sound	(7/10)
Pitchfork	(6.0/10)
PopMatters	(6/10)
Prefix	(7.5/10)
The Guardian	4/5 stars

Magnificent Fiend is the second album by Howlin Rain. It was released in 2008 on the Birdman Records label.

== Track listing ==
1. "Requiem" – 0:54
2. "Dancers at the End of Time" – 5:56
3. "Calling Lightning, Pt.2" – 5:11
4. "Lord Have Mercy" – 6:56
5. "Nomads" – 5:05
6. "El Rey" – 7:08
7. "Goodbye Ruby" – 7:51
8. "Riverboat" – 6:04

== Personnel ==
Howlin Rain

- Ethan Miller – vocals, lead guitar
- Mike Jackson – rhythm guitar
- Joel Robinow – keyboards, horn, harmony vocals
- Ian Gradek – bass
- Garrett Goddard – drums

Additional musicians

- Eli Eckert – guitar, bass
- Scott Knippelmeir – trombone
- Matt Waters – saxophone

Production

- Tim Green – recording engineer
- John Golden – mastering
- Arik Moonhawk Roper – artwork and layout
