= Wedlock (disambiguation) =

Wedlock may refer to:

- Marriage
- Wedlock (film), directed by Lewis Teague
- Wedlock (album), an album by Sunburned Hand of the Man
- Billy Wedlock, English footballer
- Fred Wedlock, English folk singer
- Wedlock, a 2009 historical book written by Wendy Moore
- Wedlock, a web-comic from Scott Kurtz
