= The Gris Gris =

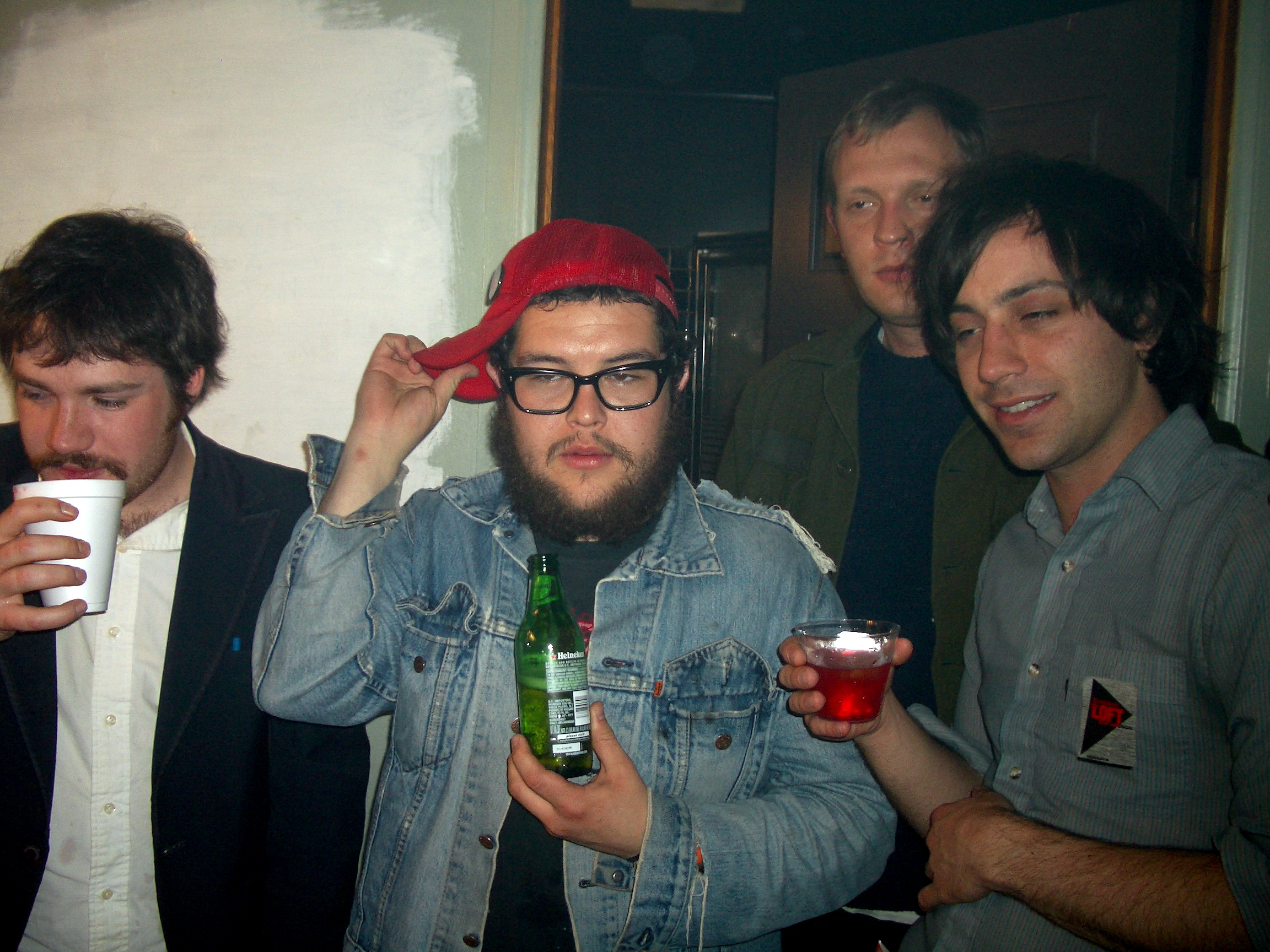

Background information
- Also known as: Gris Gris
- Origin: Houston, Texas
- Genres: Psychedelic rock
- Years active: 2003–2009
- Labels: Birdman
- Members: Greg Ashley; Joe Haener; Oscar Michel; Lars Kullberg

The Gris Gris were an American four-piece psychedelic rock band from Oakland, California via Houston, Texas originally.

== History ==
The Gris Gris first signed with Birdman Records in 2003 after Garret Goddard of the band The Cuts, gave a burned CD of Greg Ashley's first solo record Medicine Fuck Dream to the owner of Birdman Records, David Katznelson. Birdman then published Ashley's solo album, Medicine Fuck Dream, in 2003 and Gris Gris' debut self-titled album the following year.

The band released three albums together to reasonably positive reviews.

Lead-singer Greg Ashley also released eight solo albums, Medicine Fuck Dream, Painted Garden, Requiem Mass and Other Experiments, Another Generation Of Slaves, Greg Ashley & The Western Playboys, Death Of A Ladies' Man, Pictures Of Saint Paul Street and, Fiction Is Non-Fiction.

Ashley also wrote a book entitled Anecdotes.

== Band members ==
- Greg Ashley (formerly of The Mirrors, the Strate Coats, and Sir Lord Von Raven)
- Joe Haener (formerly of Battleship, The Rocknroll Adventure Kids, Blanche Devereaux. Also played in The Dodos' 2008 touring lineup.)
- Oscar Michel (formerly of the Rocknroll Adventure Kids and currently Lil' Queenie)
- Lars Kullberg (formerly of Boot Party)

== Discography ==
=== Albums ===
- The Gris Gris (2004 Birdman Records)
- For the Season (2005 Birdman Records)
- Live at the Creamery (2009 Birdman Records)

=== Singles and EPs ===
- Mary No. 38 single (2004 Birdman Records)
- Pick up your raygun (acoustic) single (2005 Birdman Records).
- 3388 Aufführungen
