= Elephant Micah and the Loud Guitars =

Studio album by Elephant Micah
- Released: September 2004
- Genre: Lo-fi/indie
- Label: Time-Lag Records

Elephant Micah chronology
Elephant Micah and the Palmyra Palm (2004)	Elephant Micah and the Loud Guitars (2004)	Home of Astronauts (2004)

Elephant Micah and the Loud Guitars is a CD-R by Elephant Micah. Released in September 2004, the album is the second in a series of three CD-Rs that he released on Time-Lag Records between May 2004 and January 2005.

Professional ratings
Review scores
Source	Rating
Allmusic	3.5/5 stars
Foxy Digitalis	7/10 stars

== Track listing ==
1. "A Duo Sonic Spiritual"
2. "As The Ghost"
3. "Mt. Dave Golan"
4. "The Environmentalist"
5. "Candy"
6. (Untitled track)
7. "Rose City (Of All Our Dreams)"
8. (Untitled track)
9. "Big Star"
10. "Tempo of Doom"
11. "Nobody Knows, Rosie"
12. "Something Psychedelic"
13. "People Behind You"
14. "When We're Speaking" (w/ hidden track)
