= The Untied States of Elephant Micah =

Studio album by Elephant Micah
- Released: September, 2002, February, 2004 (re-release)
- Recorded: Richmond, Indiana
- Genre: Lo-fi/indie
- Label: BlueSanct Records

Elephant Micah chronology
Low Energy Dance Music (2002)	The Untied States of Elephant Micah (2002)	Elephant Micah, Your Dreams Are Feeding Back (2003)

Professional ratings
Review scores
Source	Rating
Allmusic	link
Foxy Digitalis	8/10 link
Sponic Zine	link

The Untied States of Elephant Micah is the second album by Indiana lo-fi/indie musician Joe O'Connell, a.k.a. Elephant Micah. Originally released on CD-R by Orphanology in September 2002, it was officially released on BlueSanct Records in February, 2004. Only 52 copies of the original CD-R were made, and it included 3 live recordings which are not on the reissue.

== Track listing ==
1. "Vet Sounds"
2. "Grace of St. Christopher"
3. "Rides Away Again"
4. "Ohio Arch"
5. "%%%%%%%%%%%%"
6. "April 32nd"
7. "Unairconditioned Instrumental"
8. "Two TV Sets"
9. "Everything Is Good"
10. "###########"
11. "Ohio Arch Reprise"
12. "Old Song On New Love"
