= The Sun Awakens =

Studio album by Six Organs of Admittance
- Released: June 13, 2006
- Genre: Experimental rock
- Length: 44:38
- Label: Drag City

Six Organs of Admittance chronology
School of the Flower (2005)	The Sun Awakens (2006)	Shelter from the Ash (2007)

Professional ratings
Review scores
Source	Rating
AllMusic	4.5/5 stars
Pitchfork Media	8/10

The Sun Awakens is the ninth album by experimental indie rock band Six Organs of Admittance, released in 2006. Six Organs' frontman, Ben Chasny, composed all of the album's material. The album mixes influences of folk and indie rock. An eastern influence is most prominent on the final track, which includes drones, chants and a ney.

== Track listing ==
1. "Torn by Wolves" – 1:42
2. "Bless Your Blood" – 5:57
3. "Black Wall" – 5:29
4. "The Desert Is a Circle" – 2:57
5. "Attar" – 2:53
6. "Wolves' Pup" – 1:50
7. "River of Transfiguration" – 23:50
