= Embarrassment of Riches (EP) =

EP by Elephant Micah
- Released: September 2006
- Genre: Lo-fi
- Label: LRRC

Elephant Micah chronology
Tropical Depression (2006)	Embarrassment of Riches (2006)	Hindu Windmills (2006)

Embarrassment of Riches is a 6-song "albumette" by Elephant Micah which was released September 29, 2006 on Micah's own LRRC label. The record was unveiled at a record release party at Micah's alma mater, Earlham College. In late October, the album was reviewed by the Denver Post, probably the largest media publication to review an Elephant Micah release to date.

Professional ratings
Review scores
Source	Rating
Denver Post	(favorable)

== Track listing ==
1. "Feedback, So Long"
2. "The Ecstasy (Insomnia, Plus One)"
3. "Events Near Dove Cottage"
4. "What Directions"
5. "Red Roving"
6. "False Aspirants"
