= Dust and Chimes =

Studio album by Six Organs of Admittance
- Released: 2000
- Genre: Experimental rock, psychedelic folk
- Label: Pavilion

Six Organs of Admittance chronology
Nightly Trembling (1999)	Dust and Chimes (2000)	Dark Noontide (2000)

Professional ratings
Review scores
Source	Rating
AllMusic	4/5 stars

Dust and Chimes is an album by experimental indie rock band Six Organs of Admittance. It was initially released in 1999, with a wider release in 2000.

== Critical reception ==
The Quietus wrote that "the noise aspects were shorn away to a sound that was much more beholden to classic acid folk." SF Weekly wrote: "Gorgeously exotic guitar lines, shimmering bells, subtle sound effects, and incantationlike vocals combine to create a work invoking everyone from American folk radicals and British pagan-folksters to early Tyrannosaurus Rex and the Sun City Girls at their quietest."

== Track listing ==
1. "Stone Finders Verse I" – 1:35
2. "Assyria" – 3:02
3. "Hollow Light Severed Sun" – 5:29
4. "Tukulti Will Burn" – 1:13
5. "Blue Sun Chiming" – 2:41
6. "Oak Path" – 3:49
7. "Black Needle Rhymes" – 5:38
8. "Sophia" – 3:47
9. "Journey Through Sankuan Pass" – 10:49
10. "Stone Finders Verse II" – 1:38
11. "Dance Among the Waiting" – 7:18
