= Nightly Trembling =

Studio album by Six Organs of Admittance
- Released: 1999 (2003)
- Genre: Experimental rock, psychedelic folk, drone music
- Label: Time-Lag

Six Organs of Admittance chronology
| Six Organs of Admittance (1998) | Nightly Trembling (1999) | Dust and Chimes (2000) |

Professional ratings
Review scores
| Source | Rating |
|---|---|
| Allmusic | 4/5 stars |

Nightly Trembling is the second album from experimental indie rock band Six Organs of Admittance. It was originally a limited release in 1999 and was re-released in 2003. It was also contained in the box set RTZ

== Track listing ==
1. "Redefinition of Being" – 18:25
2. "Creation Aspect Fire (Reprise)" – 11:59
3. "Creation Aspect Earth" – 5:56
