= Phantom Buffalo =

Phantom Buffalo is an indie-rock band from Portland, Maine. The band was known as The Ponys until 2004, when both Portland's Ponys and Chicago-based band The Ponys were invited to perform at South by Southwest. Being the lower-profile of the two bands, the Portland group decided on a name change shortly thereafter. The current lineup consists of Jonathan Balzano-Brookes (vocals, guitar), Tim Burns (guitar, vocals), Joe Domrad (drums), Jacob Chamberlain (drums), Sean Newton (bass), and Philip Willey (guitar, accordion, keyboards). The band has released music domestically on the Time-Lag Records label and in the UK on Rough Trade Records. The band's jangly, psychedelic pop music has been compared to The Byrds and New Zealand's The Chills, as well as North American indie-pop acts like The Shins and The New Pornographers.

== Discography ==
=== Albums ===
- Shishimumu (Time-Lag 006 CD/2LP, 2002) (as The Ponys) / (Rough Trade (UK) 191 CD, 2005)
- Take to the Trees (Time-Lag, July 2008)
- Cement Postcard With Owl Colours (Microcultures (France) MM2, 2010)
- Tadaloora (Microcultures (France) MM7, 2012)

=== Singles & EPs ===
- A Hilly Town (Time-Lag 005 7" single, 2002) (as The Ponys) / Rough Trade (UK) 187 7" single, 2004)
- Flying Whale Tour EP (Time-Lag CD-R EP, 2004) (as The Ponys)
- Killing's Not Okay (Time-Lag CD-R EP, 2006)

=== Compilations ===
- Greetings From Area Code 207, Vol. 3 (Cornmeal Records CMR2073 CD, 2002) song: "Hey, That's My Only Necktie" (as The Ponys)
- Greetings From Area Code 207, Vol. 4 (Cornmeal Records CMR2074 CD, 2003) song: "Nightmare Leaves" (as The Ponys)
- Greetings From Area Code 207, Vol. 5 (Cornmeal Records CMR2075 CD, 2004) song: "Bathing Suit For A Rich Girl"
- Greetings From Area Code 207, Vol. 6 (Cornmeal Records CMR2076 CD, 2005) song: "Be The Boss"
- Maine Tracks (Cornmeal Records Best of Greetings From Area Code 207 Series) song: "Be The Boss"
