= Modey Lemon (album) =

Studio album by Modey Lemon
- Released: March 5, 2002
- Recorded: 1999–2002
- Genre: Alternative rock
- Length: 46:04
- Label: A-F Records

Modey Lemon chronology
Modey Lemon (2002)	Thunder + Lightning (2003)

Modey Lemon is the eponymous debut album by American rock band Modey Lemon.

== Track listing ==
1. "Big Bang" - 2:59
2. "His Face" - 2:48
3. "Dr. Body Snatcher" - 3:37
4. "Enfant Terrible Pt. 1" - 3:34
5. "It's Hard (The Sequal)" - 0:41
6. "Coffin Talk" - 5:59
7. "Recycler" - 1:42
8. "Bad Neighborhood" - 3:52
9. "Feed the Babies" - 3:24
10. "Grandpa's Bones" - 2:38
11. "Enfant Terrible Pt. 2" - 0:51
12. "Caligula" - 4:53
13. "Jesus Christ (For Dinner)" - 9:06

== Personnel ==
- Phil Boyd - Vocals, guitar and synthesizer
- Paul Quattrone - Drums
