= Compathia =

Studio album by Six Organs of Admittance
- Released: 2003
- Genre: Psychedelic folk
- Label: Holy Mountain

Six Organs of Admittance chronology
Dark Noontide (2003)	Compathia (2003)	For Octavio Paz (2004)

Professional ratings
Review scores
Source	Rating
Pitchfork Media	(7.6/10) link

Compathia is the fifth album release from experimental indie rock band, Six Organs of Admittance, released in 2003.

== Track listing ==
1. "Close to the Sky"
2. "Run!"
3. "Wind in My Palm"
4. "Somewhere Between"
5. "Compathia"
6. "Gone Astray"
7. "Hum a Silent Prayer"
8. "Only the Sun Knows"

Personnel: Ben Chasny - acoustic & electric guitars, vocals, percussion & bells, electronics, tapes Ethan Miller - sitar on "Somewhere Between", electric destruction guitar on "Only the Sun Knows". Ryan Hildebrand - stones, grass & bell on "Gone Astray"
