= Modey Lemon =

American garage rock band

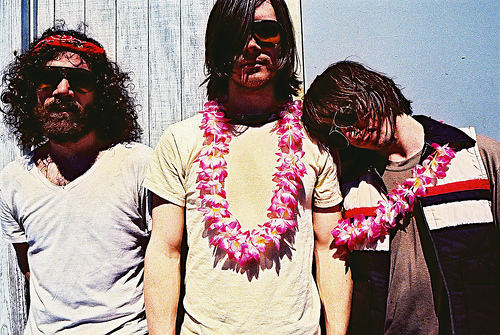
- Modey Lemon at SXSW 2008

Background information
- Origin: Pittsburgh, Pennsylvania, United States
- Genres: Garage rock, punk blues
- Years active: 1999–2010
- Labels: A-F Records, In The Red, Birdman, Mute
- Members: Paul Quattrone; Phil Boyd; Jason Kirker

Modey Lemon is an American garage rock band from Pittsburgh, Pennsylvania. The group formed in Pittsburgh's South Oakland neighborhood in 1999 as an informal side project of Dean Swagger, a rock trio that had spent the previous year mainly performing in basements to college party crowds. The original lineup consisted of guitarist Phil Boyd and drummer Paul Quattrone, then nominally students at the University of Pittsburgh. The group made its first appearances at the Halloween weekend in 1999 and played a live set on WPTS 92.1 FM, the University of Pittsburgh college radio station, segments of which later turned up on the group's demo album, House on the Hill (and, subsequently, its 2002 self-titled release).

By 2000, the duo had gained a reputation around Pittsburgh for its concerts. Modey Lemon, the group's debut album, appeared in early 2002, and the band supported the album with tours of the US and Europe. The group followed their self-titled release with a brief stint on In the Red Records, which released a double 7 inch record, before recommending the band to Birdman Records owner Dave Katznelson, who then signed the band. Prior to the mid-2003 release of second album Thunder + Lightning, Boyd and Quattrone added Jason Kirker on guitar and Moog synthesizer. Following the US release of Thunder + Lighting the band signed with Mute Records, which licensed and released the album in the UK and Europe, and via EMI (Mute's parent label) in Japan. The single releases, "Crows" (2004, #75) and "Sleepwalkers" (2005, #71), each appeared in the UK Singles Chart for one week.

Their third album The Curious City was released in August 2005 on Birdman/Mute.

Modey Lemon has performed with The White Stripes, The Von Bondies (2002 UK tour), Girl Talk, the Blues Explosion, the Yeah Yeah Yeahs, Oneida (2005 Europe tour), The Warlocks (2003 UK Tour), Icarus Line (2004 UK tour), Dinosaur Jr. (2005 tour dates in UK/Europe/US), Arctic Monkeys (2009 US tour), and has played festivals such as Glastonbury (2005), ArthurFest (2005), Meredith Music Festival (2003), and Transmusicales (2004).

In 2006, the band appeared in a 'punk club' scene in the film adaptation of Michael Chabon's novel The Mysteries of Pittsburgh, performing two original songs written for the film as well as two cover songs.

The band released their fourth album Season of Sweets on May 12, 2008. The band also completed a tour of the US in June and July that year and a tour of the UK and mainland Europe in September.

In August 2009 the band supported the Arctic Monkeys in New York City, Boston, and Chicago.

In October 2009, it was announced that their track "Become a Monk" from the band's album Season of Sweets, would be included on the soundtrack of the video game, Tony Hawk: Ride.

In 2010, Modey Lemon recorded and released one single "Wandering Eye b/w Cheetahs for Chariots" on These Are Not Records, and performed once at the University of Pittsburgh's William Pitt Union in spring 2010, before going on indefinite hiatus.

In 2015, Modey Lemon's first two albums House on the Hill and Modey Lemon were reissued on vinyl for the first time on A-F Records, Mind Cure Records, and Omentum Records.

== Discography ==
- House on the Hill (2000)
- Modey Lemon (2002)
- Thunder + Lightning (2003)
- The Curious City (2005)
- Birth of Jazz EP (2008)
- Season of Sweets (2008)

== Other projects and collaborations ==
The members of Modey Lemon remained active musically after their last performance as a group in spring 2010.

Boyd and Quattrone formed Shockwave Riderz in 2012 with singer Sara Mac. Boyd played drums and sang while Quattrone operated an MPC sampler and effects pedals. The band released 3 singles "Riderz USA 2013" (self-released), "Mountaintop Rock" (Volcomm Entertainment), and "Punisher/Dearest" (Velocity of Sound). Shockwave Riderz toured the US with the Jon Spencer Blues Explosion and !!! in 2013 and again with the Jon Spencer Blues Explosion in 2014 before disbanding.

Quattrone was active in numerous bands within Pittsburgh in the 2000s. He also was a member of !!! (Chk Chk Chk) for several years before relocating to Los Angeles where he joined Thee Oh Sees and also formed Warm Drag.

Boyd and Kirker formed the rock quartet Old Head in 2012 with Pittsburgh comic book artist and musician Bill Wehmann and musician Mike Layton. The band released the self-titled album "Old Head" in 2015 on Omentum Records. Layton has recorded several solo albums under the name Expires and currently lives in San Francisco, CA. Kirker currently lives in Pittsburgh, PA.

Boyd has released several solo albums under the name Hidden Twin since 2006. He also performed with the electronic duo TM Eye from 2010 to 2012 with Pittsburgh producer/musician and operator of Machine Age Studios, Preslav Lefterov. TM Eye released one mix tape "Ecolectro Mix" (Deer Skull Records) and two singles "Deepwater Horizon/Sundown" (Cass Records) and "Exposure/Pollution" (Machine Age Records). Boyd was credited with co-authorship and guitar on !!!'s "Bam City" from their 2015 album As If (album) and collaborated with Warm Drag on their 2018 self-titled LP on In The Red Records. He currently lives in Texas.
