= Dark Noontide =

Studio album by Six Organs of Admittance
- Released: 2002
- Genre: Experimental rock
- Label: Holy Mountain

Six Organs of Admittance chronology
Dust and Chimes (2000)	Dark Noontide (2002)	Compathia (2003)

Professional ratings
Review scores
Source	Rating
AllMusic	4.5/5 stars
Pitchfork Media	(8.2/10)

Dark Noontide is the fourth album from experimental indie rock band Six Organs of Admittance, released in 2002.

== Track listing ==
1. "Spirits Abandoned" 6.21
2. "Regeneration" 5.32
3. "On Returning Home" 5.46
4. "Dark Noontide" 6.55
5. "This Hand" 4.45
6. "Awaken" 1.43
7. "Khidr and the Fountain" 7.27
8. "A Thousand Birds" 3.24
