= School of the Flower =

Studio album by Six Organs of Admittance
- Released: January 25, 2005
- Genre: Experimental rock
- Label: Drag City

Six Organs of Admittance chronology
The Manifestation (2004)	School of the Flower (2005)	The Sun Awakens (2006)

Professional ratings
Aggregate scores
Source	Rating
Metacritic	83/100
Review scores
Source	Rating
AllMusic	4/5 stars
Alternative Press	5/5 stars
Cokemachineglow	81%
Drowned in Sound	9/10
Pitchfork	8.3/10
Q	3.5/5 stars
Stylus	B
Tiny Mix Tapes	4/5 stars

School of the Flower is an album by experimental indie rock band Six Organs of Admittance, released in 2005.

== Critical reception ==
Writing retrospectively in 2021, Pitchfork's Brian Howe reflected on the album's initial reception:

There was exactly one moment when it was possible to briefly state the kind of music that Ben Chasny makes. It was in 2005, when his uncharacteristic singer-songwriter album School of the Flower caused his seven-year-old experimental project, Six Organs of Admittance, to be linked with the acoustic psych-pop fad known as New Weird America or, somehow even more embarrassingly, freak-folk. But the former term was a particularly odd fit for him. Like the guitarist Jack Rose, Chasny’s acoustic fingerpicking looked beyond folk idioms and toward influences like the Indian raga, which he fused with drone music. This wasn’t stuff you’d sing around a campfire, and even Chasny’s least hermetic tunes felt distinct from the ersatz standards, sea shanties, and court songs that became associated with freak-folk.

== Track listing ==
1. "Eighth Cognition/All You've Left" – 5:22
2. "Words for Two" – 1:40
3. "Saint Cloud" – 5:36
4. "Procession of Cherry Blossom Spirits" – 3:30
5. "Home" – 3:53
6. "School of the Flower" – 13:31
7. "Thicker Than a Smokey" – 3:12
8. "Lisboa" – 2:58
