= The Manifestation =

Studio album by Six Organs of Admittance
- Released: 2004
- Genre: Psychedelic folk, Drone music
- Label: Ba Da Bing

Six Organs of Admittance chronology
For Octavio Paz (2003)	The Manifestation (2004)	School of the Flower (2005)

Professional ratings
Review scores
Source	Rating
Allmusic	4/5 stars
Pitchfork Media	(7.6/10) link

The Manifestation is the seventh album release from experimental indie rock band, Six Organs of Admittance, released in 2004. It contains the lengthy single release of "The Manifestation" from 2000, and a new six-part suite, The Six Stations, composed by Ben Chasny as he improvised around the noise produced by playing on a turntable the etching of the sun that appears on the back of the original single.

== Track listing ==
1. "The Manifestation"
2. "The Six Stations"
