= For Octavio Paz =

Studio album by Six Organs of Admittance
- Released: 2003
- Genre: Psychedelic folk, Instrumental
- Label: Holy Mountain

Six Organs of Admittance chronology
Compathia (2003)	For Octavio Paz (2003)	The Manifestation (2004)

For Octavio Paz is the sixth album release from Six Organs of Admittance, released in 2003. This album marked a return to the lo-fi, intricate guitar work of Chasney's early work. Only the album's second track, "When you Finally Return" features Chasney's voice.

Professional ratings
Review scores
Source	Rating
Pitchfork Media	8.0

== Track listing ==
1. "Fire on Rain"
2. "When You Finally Return"
3. "Memory, Memory, Memory"
4. "The Night Knows Nothing at All"
5. "Elk River"
6. "They Fixed the Broken Windmill Today"
7. "Rain on Fire"
8. "The Acceptance of Absolute Negation"
