= Boss (album) =

Studio album by Magik Markers
- Released: September 25, 2007
- Genre: Noise rock
- Length: 43:31
- Label: Ecstatic Peace
- Producer: Lee Ranaldo

Magik Markers chronology
The Volodor Dance (2006)	Boss (2007)	Balf Quarry (2009)

Professional ratings
Review scores
Source	Rating
AllMusic	4/5 stars
Drowned in Sound	8/10 stars
Pitchfork Media	(7.5/10)
PrefixMag	7/10 stars
Tiny Mix Tapes	4.5/5 marks

Boss is an album by noise rock band Magik Markers, released on September 25, 2007. It was their second release on the Ecstatic Peace label, the first being I Trust My Guitar, Etc., from 2005. A vinyl version was released via Arbitrary Signs.

== Track listing ==
1. "Axis Mundi" - 6:23
2. "Body Rot" - 2:19
3. "Last of the Lemach Line" - 8:59
4. "Empty Bottles" - 4:32
5. "Taste" - 4:21
6. "Four/The Ballad of Harry Angstrom" - 5:22
7. "Pat Garrett" - 4:08
8. "Bad Dream/Hartford's Beat Suite" - 4:12
9. "Circle" - 3:15
