= Hexadic =

Studio album by Six Organs of Admittance
- Released: February 17, 2015
- Genre: Experimental Rock, drone, noise rock
- Length: 38:08
- Label: Drag City

Six Organs of Admittance chronology
Ascent (2012)	Hexadic (2015)	Hexadic II (2015)

Professional ratings
Aggregate scores
Source	Rating
Metacritic	67/100
Review scores
Source	Rating
AllMusic	4/5 stars
Pitchfork	7.6/10

Hexadic is a studio album by rock band Six Organs of Admittance. It was released in February 2015 under Drag City Records.

== Track list ==
No.	Title	Length
1.	"The Ram"	2:50
2.	"Wax Chance"	5:31
3.	"Maximum Hexadic"	2:21
4.	"Hesitant Grand Light"	3:08
5.	"Hollow River"	3:26
6.	"Sphere Path Code C"	3:41
7.	"Future Verbs"	5:36
8.	"Vestige"	4:44
9.	"Guild"	6:51
