= Elephant Micah =

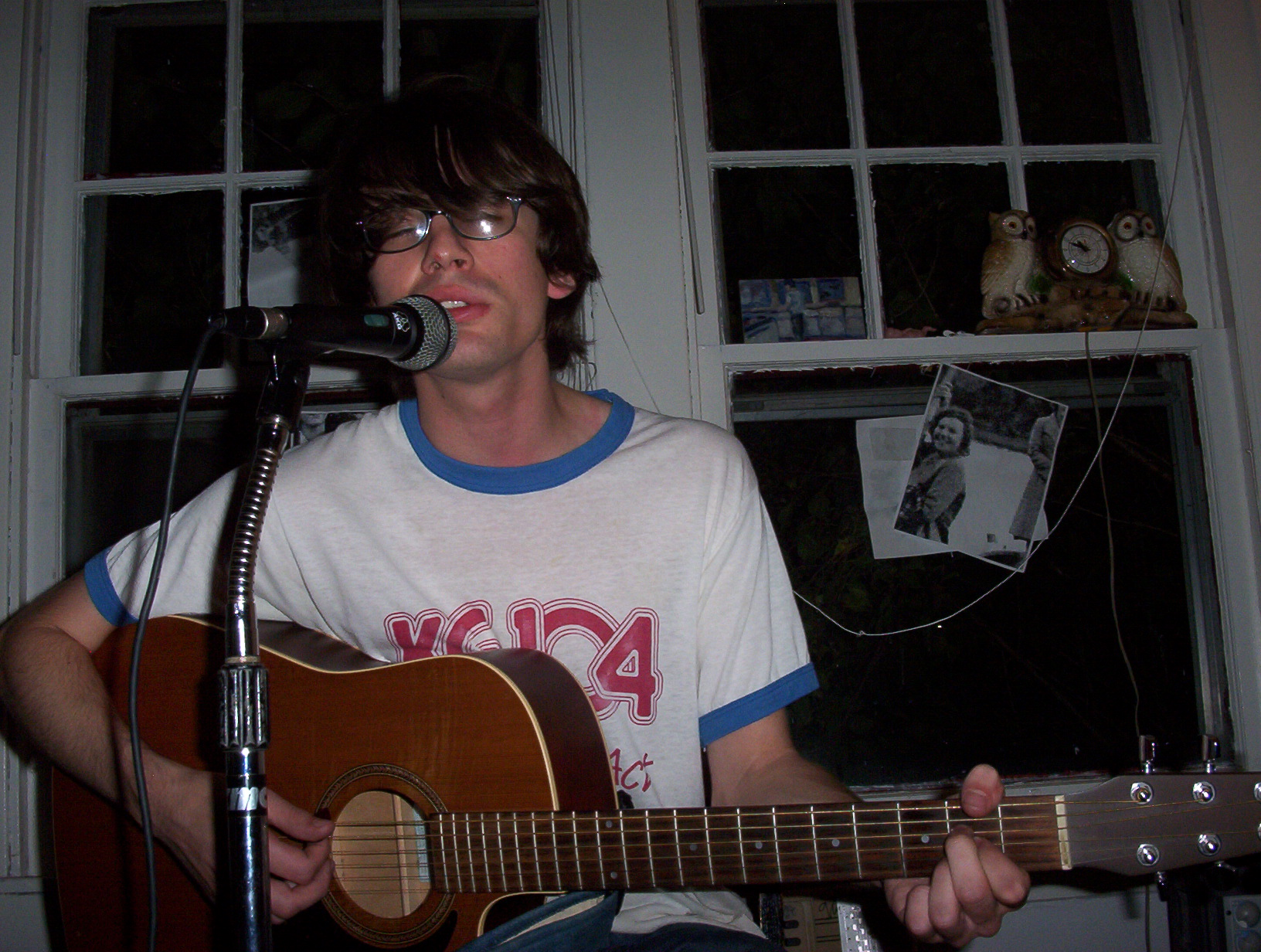
- Elephant Micah performing live.

Background information
- Born: Joseph O'Connell
- Genres: Lo-fi, indie, folk rock
- Occupations: Singer-songwriter, multi-instrumentalist
- Instruments: Guitar, vocals
- Years active: 2000–present
- Labels: Luddite Rural, BlueSanct, Time-Lag
- Website: www.elephantmicah.com

Elephant Micah is a musical band or stage name of southern Indiana songwriter and multi-instrumentalist Joseph O'Connell. Recording mostly at home, O’Connell has produced an eclectic body of work since beginning the project in 2000. Elephant Micah's inconsistently available music has become a cult favorite among some lo-fi/indie and folk rock audiences.

O'Connell has released recordings with BlueSanct Records, the experimental-leaning Time-Lag Records, and a number of other very small labels. In addition, he has issued several short-run CDs on his own LRRC (Luddite Rural Recording Cooperative) imprint, also home to music by collaborator Jason Henn.

In 2005, Elephant Micah shared bills with Jason Molina's Magnolia Electric Company during a string of shows in the United Kingdom.

== Discography ==
=== LPs ===
- Low Energy Dance Music (2002, Landmark Records)
- The Untied States of Elephant Micah (CD-R) (Original release) (2002, Orphanology)
- Elephant Micah, Your Dreams Are Feeding Back (2003, BlueSanct Records)
- The Untied States of Elephant Micah (Reissue) (2004, BlueSanct Records)
- Elephant Micah and the Palmyra Palm (CD-R) (2004, Time-Lag Records)
- Elephant Micah and the Loud Guitars (CD-R) (2004, Time-Lag Records)
- Elephant Micah and the Agrarian Malaise (CD-R) (2005, Time-Lag Records)
- Futile Sessions (CD-R) (2005, LRRC)
- Hindu Windmills (2006 [Vinyl], 2007 [CD], Time-Lag Records)
- Exiled Magicians (2008, Third Uncle Records)
- Elephant Micah Plays the Songs of Bible Birds (2010, Time-Lag Records)
- Echoer's Intent (2010, Time-Lag Records)
- Louder Than Thou (2012, Paradise of Bachelors Records)
- Globe Rush Progressions (2013, Product of Palmyra Records)
- Where in Our Woods (2015, Western Vinyl)
- Genericana (2018, Western Vinyl)
- Vague Tidings (2021, Western Vinyl)

=== EPs ===
- Lost Sense Recollected (Tape) (2001, LRRC)
- Home of Astronauts 7-inch EP (2004, Third Uncle Records)
- Tropical Depression (2006, LRRC)
- Embarrassment of Riches (2006, LRRC)
- Alsatian Sunlight (2007, self-released)
- Equine Emblem 7-inch (2008, The Great Pop Supplement)
- In Midnight / Ocean Floor 7-inch (2008, L'Animaux Tryst)
- The Mayor of Rocky Ripple (2011, Palmyra)
- Mistook the Rainbow/In Whose Shadow (2016, Third Uncle/Magnetic South)

=== Collaborations ===
- Mingus Plays Electric Guitar (7-inch EP w/ Jason Henn) (2003, LRRC)
- Hiss Golden Messenger Plays Elephant Micah Plays Hiss Golden Messenger (7-inch EP w/ Hiss Golden Messenger) (2012, Paradise of Batchelors)
