= Comets on Fire =

American noise rock band

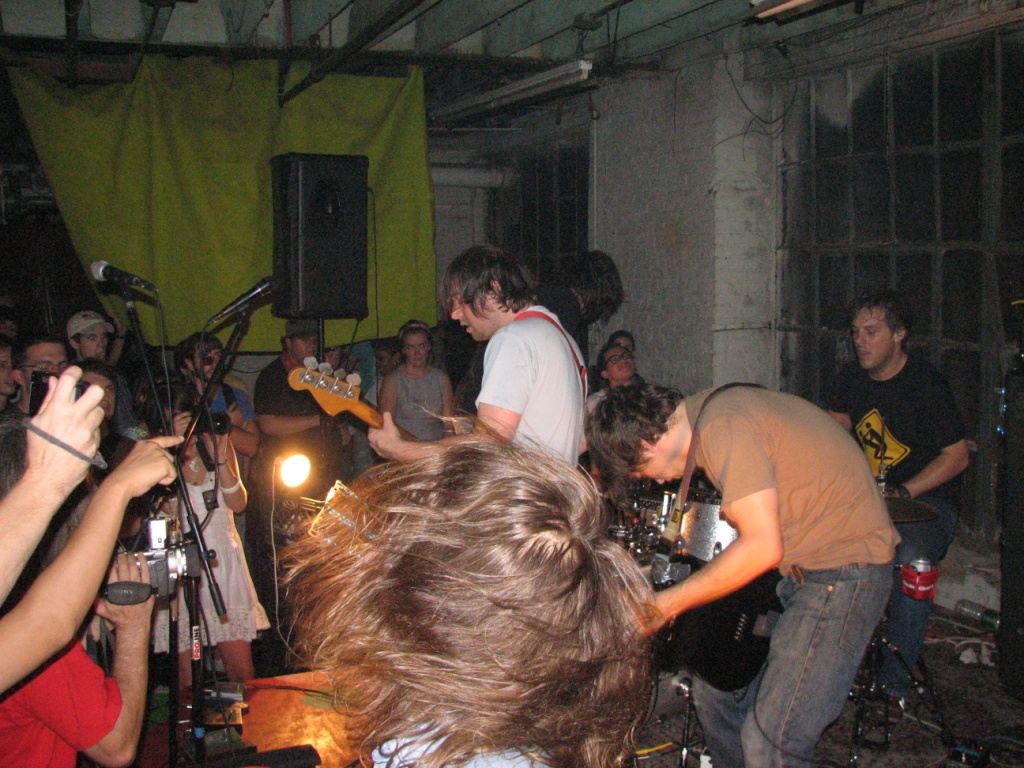
- Comets on Fire in New York in 2006

Background information
- Origin: Santa Cruz, California, U.S.
- Genres: Psychedelic rock, noise rock, garage rock, blues rock, punk blues, New Weird America
- Years active: 1999–2008
- Labels: Alternative Tentacles, Sub Pop
- Members: Ethan Miller; Ben Flashman; Ben Chasny; Utrillo Kushner; Noel von Harmonson

Comets on Fire were an American noise rock band from Santa Cruz in California that released four studio albums between 2001 and 2006. The band was formed in 1999 by guitarist and vocalist Ethan Miller and longtime friend bassist Ben Flashman, who were seeking to create rhythmically and sonically intense music that paid no attention to categorizations.

== History ==
The band started in 1999 and released their debut record on Alternative Tentacles (Jello Biafra's label). This album shows the influence of the Butthole Surfers, Hawkwind and the MC5. The next album Field Recordings from the Sun for Ba Da Bing label showed more growth on the record with new drummer Utrillo Kushner, as well as saxophones being added to their noise rock jams. Before the next record the band officially added Ben Chasny of Six Organs of Admittance to their lineup in 2003. He had previously performed and recorded with them. With this line-up they got a deal on Sub Pop Records and released their critically acclaimed Blue Cathedral. The record exposed them to a whole new fan base and the record found favor with enough people for Comets on Fire to tour as the opening act for Sonic Youth, Dinosaur Jr and Mudhoney. In 2006, they released their fourth album Avatar which showed the band turning away from their psychedelic noise jams for a more subdued sound that ventures close to classic rock at times.

They are notable for their heavy use of the Echoplex, used primarily on vocals but on other instruments as well. This often renders the lyrics unintelligible; Miller claims to not remember the lyrics after putting an album together.

After completing tours for Avatar through 2008, the band went on an extended hiatus. In the intervening period Ethan Miller began focusing attention on his Howlin' Rain project, and Noel von Harmonson joined Sic Alps. In 2012, the band members regrouped to record as Six Organs of Admittance for a new album entitled Ascent. In an interview with Uncut, Chasny emphasized that the group had not broken up, but that future plans were still uncertain. In June 2013, the band announced via their website that they would play the final All Tomorrow's Parties festival, in Camber Sands.

== Band members ==
- Ethan Miller - vocals, guitar
- Noel von Harmonson - echoplex, drums
- Ben Flashman - bass
- Utrillo Kushner - drums, keyboards
- Ben Chasny - guitar

== Discography ==
=== Albums ===
- Comets on Fire (2001)
- Field Recordings from the Sun (2002)
- Blue Cathedral (2004)
- Avatar (2006)

=== Other ===
- Live in Europa (Split LP with Major Stars, Limited 500 copies) (2003)
- Bong Voyage (Limited 800 copies) (2003)
- Cardboard Sub Pop Promo Jams (Limited 1000 copies) (2004)
- Euro Tour 5 CDR Boxset (Self Released, limited 10 copies) (2005)
- Collaboration (Split LP with Burning Star Core, Limited 1000 copies) (2005)

== Related projects ==
- Howlin' Rain
- Six Organs of Admittance
- Colossal Yes - side project of Utrillo Kushner
- Heron Oblivion
