= Elephant Micah and the Agrarian Malaise =

Studio album by Elephant Micah
- Released: January 2005
- Genre: Lo-fi
- Length: 52:08
- Label: Time-Lag Records

Elephant Micah chronology
Home of Astronauts (2004)	Elephant Micah and the Agrarian Malaise (2005)	Futile Sessions (2005)

Elephant Micah and the Agrarian Malaise is a CD-R released by Elephant Micah in January 2005. It is the final in a series of three CD-Rs released on Time-Lag Records. "Shaking Takes Its Toll" had previously been released as "The Ambulance Song" on a Rowntree Records Christmas compilation.

== Track listing ==
1. (Untitled Track)
2. "Naive Attraction"
3. "Malaysia"
4. "Dream Feedback"
5. "Minors' Refrain"
6. "Don't Say No"
7. "Hawaii and the Derby Day"
8. "Distortion That's Golden"
9. "Shaking Takes Its Toll"
10. "Speaker Piles"
11. "They Can Dance"
12. "The Story of My Expatriate Friends"
13. "Blue Ridge"
14. "Light Pollution Blues" (w/ hidden, alternate version of "Distortion That's Golden")
