= Low Energy Dance Music =

Studio album by Elephant Micah
- Released: February 2002
- Recorded: Louisville, Kentucky
- Genre: Lo-fi, indie
- Label: Landmark Records

Elephant Micah chronology
Lost Sense Recollected (2001)	Low Energy Dance Music (2002)	The Untied States of Elephant Micah (2002)

Professional ratings
Review scores
Source	Rating
Sponic Zine	4/5 stars

Low Energy Dance Music is the debut studio album by the indie rock band Elephant Micah. It was released in 2002 on Landmark Records.

== Track listing ==
1. ~ ~ ~ ~ ~ ~ ~ ~
2. "You Take My Sense With Longing"
3. "Loud Guitars"
4. "Breakdance in 3/4"
5. "Late Radio"
6. "Put to Bed"
7. * * * * * * * *
8. "Story of a Hospitalized Heart"
9. "Like This:"
10. "Artificial Lights' Flickering"
11. "Piece for Organ and Baritone"
12. "Halloween Sunday"
13. "Dance Sensation"
14. "Rides Away"
15. "Low Energy Beat"
