= Blue Cathedral =

Studio album by Comets on Fire
- Released: July 27, 2004
- Recorded: 2004
- Genre: Psychedelic rock, space rock
- Length: 44:36
- Label: Sub Pop

Comets on Fire chronology
Field Recordings from the Sun (2002)	Blue Cathedral (2004)	Avatar (2006)

Professional ratings
Aggregate scores
Source	Rating
Metacritic	84/100
Review scores
Source	Rating
AllMusic	4/5 stars
Drowned in Sound	9/10
Mojo	4/5 stars
Now	4/5 stars
Pitchfork	8.5/10
Spin	B+
Stylus	8/10
Tiny Mix Tapes	5/5 stars
Uncut	4/5 stars
Under the Radar	6/10

Blue Cathedral is the third studio album by Comets on Fire. It was released in 2004 on the Sub Pop label.

In an interview, Comets on Fire echoplex and electronics player Noel von Harmonson stated that the album cover art for Blue Cathedral was a photograph of an elephant that suffered from a disease causing a lack of pigment in some areas of its skin. In 2007, the album was performed live in its entirety as part of the All Tomorrow's Parties-curated Don't Look Back series.

== Track listing ==
1. "The Bee and the Cracking Egg" – 7:45
2. "Pussy Foot the Duke" – 5:07
3. "Whiskey River" – 7:54
4. "Organs" – 1:45
5. "The Antlers of the Midnight Sun" – 4:06
6. "Brotherhood of the Harvest" – 4:39
7. "Wild Whiskey" – 3:00
8. "Blue Tomb" – 10:06
