= Magik Markers =

American noise rock band

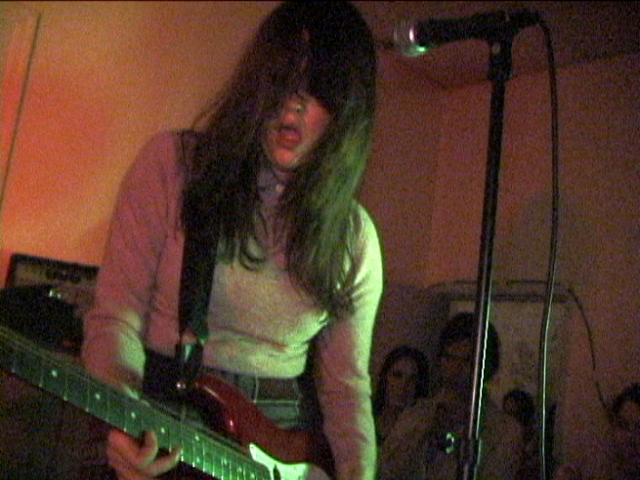
- Elisa Ambrogio of Magik Markers performing live at Death By Audio, Brooklyn

Background information
- Origin: Hartford, Connecticut
- Genres: Noise rock; avant-rock; psychedelic rock; lo-fi
- Years active: 2001–present
- Labels: Arbitrary Signs; Ecstatic Peace!; Drag City

Magik Markers are an American noise rock band from Hartford, Connecticut, United States, formed in 2001. The members, Elisa Ambrogio, Pete Nolan and Leah Quimby started the band in their basement, and gained wider recognition after opening for Sonic Youth on their American tour in 2004.

== Biography ==
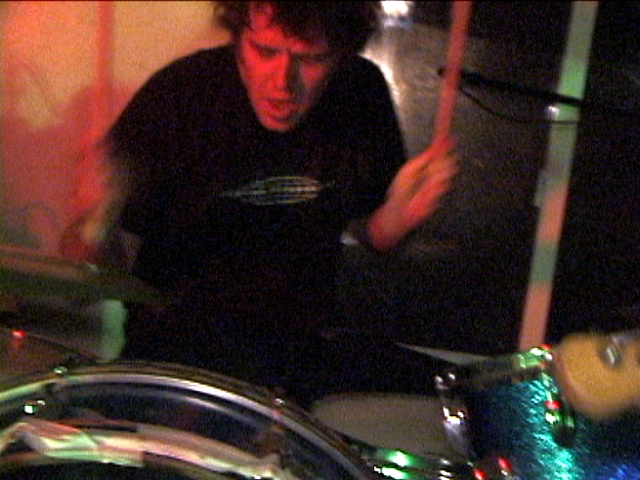
Pete Nolan in 2007

Elisa Ambrogio, Pete Nolan and Leah Quimby formed Magik Markers in their basement in 2001. They gained wider recognition after opening for Sonic Youth on their American tour in 2004. Their debut album, I Trust My Guitar, Etc... (released in vinyl only), was released in 2005 on Thurston Moore's Ecstatic Peace label. In 2006, they released A Panegyric To The Things I Do Not Understand under Gulcher Records, the Markers' first proper CD. Also in 2006, the band recorded a session for Southern records' Latitudes series, which was released as The Voldoror Dance. Leah Quimby left in May 2006 to pursue a career in ventriloquism. Various people filled in before they eventually settled as a duo composed of original members Pete and Elisa. In September 2007, the band released Boss, which was produced by Lee Ranaldo.

Magik Markers have since toured the US and Europe several times. As a part of the Threelobed subscription series they released Gucci Rapidshare Download in 2008. Since their inception, Nolan, through his Arbitrary Signs imprint, has consistently produced limited release releases of the band's recordings and live performances, all with original handmade artwork, intended for a small audience. With the increasing ubiquity of file sharing, the entire catalogue of long out of print cdrs became readily available. Gucci Rapidshare Download was created by downloading Magik Markers cdrs from websites where they had been posted and remixing and recontextualizing the sounds with newly recorded and archival material.

In 2008, Magik Markers played for the first time in Scotland, Austria, Ireland, Latvia and Wales. Jefferson Hack invited Magik Markers to perform live from Studio A at Abbey Road in London, as part of Nick Kent's ShowStudio project. They also traveled to Nitra, Estonia to appear in a film by Veiko Õunpuu. Peter Nolan was honored to again play drums in Jandek's band alongside Matt Heyner in London, and Elisa Ambrogio joined Six Organs of Admittance on a US and two European tours. Peter Nolan's Spectre Folk played their first UK tour, with Julie Tomlinson and John Truscinski, and Rupert Murdock. While not touring Elisa Ambrogio recorded an LP and performed with San Francisco Dirty Stealer (featuring members of Comets on Fire) and contributed short pieces of writing to various projects. In the winter of 2008 Magik Markers recorded a new record titled Balf Quarry with Grammy winning producer and wizard Scott Colburn of Seattle. Balf Quarry was released in May 2009 on Drag City. The band released a studio album in 2020, titled 2020. Pitchfork gave it a rating of 7.3 out of ten.

== Discography ==
2002

- Beep Beep (CD-R, Arbitrary Signs)
- Mystery City (CD-R, Arbitrary Signs)

2003

- Book as Symbol of 8 Precious Things - Hand of the Creator (CD-R, Arbitrary Signs)

2004

- In the East (CD-R, Imvated)
- Blues for Randy Sutherland (CD-R, Arbitrary Signs)
- Live '03 (CD-R, Arbitrary Signs)
- Live in Ashville (CD-R, Slippy Town)
- Live Summer 2004 (CD-R, Arbitrary Signs)

2005

- Tale of the Whale (CD-R)
- I Trust My Guitar, Etc. (LP, Ecstatic Peace)
- Feel the Crayon (CD-R, Apostasy/Arbitrary Signs / LP, Not Not Fun)
- NxCxHxCx Vol. 1 (LP, no label)

2006

- Inverted Belgium (LP, Hospital Productions)
- For Sada Jane (CD, Textile Records)
- Don and Phil (CD-R, Arbitrary Signs)
- If it's Not a Ford it Sux (CD-R, Arbitrary Signs)
- Road Pussy (CD-R, Arbitrary Signs)
- A Panegyric to the Things I Do Not Understand (CD, Gulcher Records)
- Voldoror Dance (CD, Latitudes)
- Black & Blue (CD-R, Arbitrary Signs)

2007

- Last of the Retsin - You Can't Fuck a Clock / Here Lies the Last of the Redstone (CD-R, Arbitrary Signs)
- Castel Franco Veneto Zagreb Super Report (CD-R, Arbitrary Signs)
- Magik Markers (LP, Spring Press)
- M/M/D/C/ (CD-R, Arbitrary Signs)
- Boss (CD, Ecstatic Peace / LP, Arbitrary Signs)
- Redux aka the Real McCoy (CD-R, Arbitrary Signs)

2008

- Bored Fortress, split with Vampire Belt (7", Not Not Fun Records)
- Danau Blues (CD-R, Arbitrary Signs)
- For Mary Meyer, the Blind Bear of the Dustbowl (CD-R, Arbitrary Signs)
- Pwtre Ser (CD-R, Arbitrary Signs)
- Gucci Rapidshare Download Three Lobed Recordings - September 8, 2008

2009

- Baltimore Trust (CD-R, Arbitrary Signs)
- Balf Quarry (LP/CD, Drag City - May 5, 2009)
- Shame Mask (CD-R, Arbitrary Signs)
- Я (CD-R, Arbitrary Signs)
- Tour 12 (vinyl; MP3 Download, Yik Yak - November 30, 2009) with Sic Alps

2010

- Volodor Dance (CD, Phantom Records ) - February 2, 2010

2013

- Surrender to the Fantasy (LP/CD, Drag City - Nov 19, 2013)

2020

- 2020 (LP/CD, Drag City)
