= Sunburned Hand of the Man =

American experimental rock band

- Origin: Boston, Massachusetts, United States
- Genres: Psychedelic rock, experimental rock, free improvisation, noise rock, psychedelic folk, drone, New Weird America
- Years active: 1997–present
- Members: David Bohill; John Moloney; Keith Wood; Marc Orleans; Paul LaBrecque; Phil Franklin; Robert Thomas; Ron Schneiderman; Chad Cooper; David Bohill; Conrad Capistran; Cousin Rich; Critter; Rich Pontius; James Coleman; Valerie Webb; Micheal Josef K Christine Shields; Chris Corsano; Taylor Richardson; Jeremy Pisani; Christine Steele; Keith Wood; Gozzy; Michael Flower; Bridget Hayden; John Godbert; Dredd Foole; Paul Flaherty; Byron Coley; Gary War; Jack Callahan; Orion Russell; Adam Langelotti; Sarah Gibbons; Vanessa Brewster; Greta Svalberg; Jenna Weingarten; Sam Gas Can; Murph; Sarah O' Shea; Tony Goddess; Adam Noedlman; Matt Krefting; Brian Donnelly; Donald Harney; Shannon Ketch

Sunburned Hand of the Man are an experimental rock band from Boston, Massachusetts. They are a loose collective known for their frequent line up changes and large discography released on a variety of labels including Eclipse Records, Thurston Moore's Ecstatic Peace!, Three Lobed Recordings, and their own Manhand label.

== Biography ==
Sunburned Hand of the Man formed in Boston in 1994, growing out of a trio named Shit Spangled Banner with John Moloney and Robert Thomas managing an ever-changing line-up. Their initial influences included Sonic Youth and the Melvins, though as their line-up expanded they began to incorporate elements of folk, drone, free jazz, and funk.

By the early 2000s the band were increasingly associated with the "free folk" movement as described by David Keenan in his article "New Weird America" for The Wire. The following decade saw a consistent stream of limited edition releases and live documents, ranging from improvised noise to more coherently arranged material such as 2007's Four Tet-produced Fire Escape and 2010's A.

Their output slowed during the 2010s and releases became more infrequent, although the band never fully deactivated.

Frequent Sunburned guitarist Marc Orleans died on June 25, 2020, at the age of 52. The following year the band returned with Pick a Day to Die, an album edited together from unreleased material recorded between 2007 and 2017.

== Selected discography ==
- 1994 Shit Spangled Banner (self-released cassette, Ecstatic Yod Ass Run LP)
- 1997 Mind Of A Brother (Manhand 001, CD)
- 1998 Piff's Clicks (Manhand 002, CD)
- 2001 Jaybird (Manhand 003, CD)
- 2001 Wild Animal (Manhand 004, CD)
- 2001 The Healers Barrel (Manhand 005, CD)
- 2002 The Book of Pressure (Manhand 006, CD)
- 2002 The Agoraphobic Christcycle (Manhand 007, CD)
- 2002 Headdress (Records, LP)
- 2002 Jaybird (Qbico, LP)
- 2002 Sopra L'Influsso - video - (Qbico)
- 2003 Shit Spangled Banner-Inflated with Self-Hatred (Manhand 008, CD)
- 2003 Closer to the Bone (Manhand 009/010, CD)
- 2003 Magnetic Drugs (Manhand 011, CD)
- 2003 The Trickle Down Theory of God Knows What (Eclipse, LP, CD)
- 2003 The Sunburned Hand of the Man (LP)
- 2003 Hoof Trip (Riot Season, 7")
- 2004 Soft (Manhand 012)
- 2004 Rare Wood (Spirit of Orr, CD)
- 2004 The Secret in Disguise (Finga 013, CD)
- 2004 No Magic Man (Bastet, CD)
- 2005 Zample (Manhand 014, CD)
- 2005 Anatomy (Manhand 024, CD)
- 2005 Wedlock (Eclipse, double LP)
- 2005 Complexion (Records, LP)
- 2006 The Mylar Tantrum (Three Lobed Recordings, CD)
- 2006 Bone For Sky Baba Ganoush (Chad Cooper CD)
- 2007 Z (Ecstatic Peace, CD)
- 2007 The Blaze Game (Conspiracy Records) - collaboration with Circle as Sunburned Circle
- 2007 Fire Escape (Smalltown Supersound) - produced by Four Tet
- 2007 "Weekend at Burnie's 2" (Lost Treasures of the Underworld, LP)
- 2007 "Locked / Loaded" Cs (Meudiademorte, Cassette]
- 2008 the Spacial Crime symbol (Manhand 082, CD)
- 2009 Loose Bugs (Magnetic Expansion Label, CD)
- 2010 A (Ecstatic Peace!, LP) - produced by Four Tet
- 2019 Headless (Sunburned Records 165, CD)
- 2020 Covered In Mud (Manhand 170, CD)
- 2021 Pick a Day To Die (Three Lobed Recordings)
- 2021 Vulgarisms (Manhand 178, CD)
- 2021 Exile on Broadway (Manhand 172, CD)
- 2021 The Air Itself (Manhand 182, CD)
- 2022 Headdress 20th Anniversary Remaster (Three Lobed Recordings 141, LP)
- 2024 Nimbus (Three Lobed Recordings 150, LP)
