= Field Recordings from the Sun =

Studio album by Comets on Fire
- Released: 2002
- Genre: Psychedelic rock, noise rock, space rock
- Length: 36:44
- Label: Ba Da Bing

Comets on Fire chronology
Comets On Fire (2001)	Field Recordings from the Sun (2002)	Blue Cathedral (2004)

Professional ratings
Review scores
Source	Rating
AllMusic	3/5 stars
Aural Innovations	(favorable)
Pitchfork Media	8.0/10

Field Recordings from the Sun is the second studio album from indie/noise rock group Comets on Fire, released in 2002 on Ba Da Bing Records.

== Track listing ==
1. "Beneath the Ice Age" - 9:20
2. "Return to Heaven" - 6:29
3. "The Unicorn" - 3:51
4. "ESP" - 6:42
5. "The Black Poodle" - 10:22
