= Six Organs of Admittance (album) =

Studio album by Six Organs of Admittance
- Released: 1998
- Genre: Experimental rock, psychedelic folk, drone
- Label: Holy Mountain

Six Organs of Admittance chronology
Six Organs of Admittance (1998)	Nightly Trembling (1999)

Professional ratings
Review scores
Source	Rating
Allmusic	3/5 stars

Six Organs of Admittance is the first album release by experimental indie rock band, Six Organs of Admittance, released in 1998.

== Track listing ==
1. "Maria"
2. "Sum of All Heaven"
3. "Shadow of a Dune"
4. "Harmonice Mundi II"
5. "Race for Vishnu"
6. "Invitation to the SR for Supper"
7. "Don't Be Afraid"
