= Comets on Fire (album) =

Studio album by Comets on Fire
- Released: 2001 (self-release); 2003 (Alternative Tentacles)
- Recorded: 2000–2001
- Genre: Psychedelic rock, noise rock, garage rock
- Length: 60:20
- Label: Alternative Tentacles

Comets on Fire chronology
Comets on Fire (2001)	Field Recordings from the Sun (2002)

Professional ratings
Review scores
Source	Rating
AllMusic	3/5 stars
Pitchfork Media	(8.2/10)

Comets on Fire is the debut album from Santa Cruz psychedelic rock band Comets on Fire. It was released in 2001 by Alternative Tentacles.

== Track listing ==
1. "All I Need" – 2:56
2. "Graverobbers" – 4:40
3. "One Foot" – 5:57
4. "Got a Feelin" – 2:03
5. "Rimbaud Blues" – 0:41
6. "Let's Take It All" – 3:57
7. "The Way Down" – 3:29
8. "Comets on Fire" – 1:57
9. "Ghost of the Cosmos" – 6:06
10. "Days of Vapors" – 28:11

== Personnel ==
Comets on Fire

- Ethan Miller – vocals, electric guitar
- Noel Harmonson – Echoplex
- Ben Flashman – bass guitar
- Chris Gonzales – drums

Production

- Comets on Fire – recording, mixing
- Tim Green – mixing
- Nick Taplin – live recording
- Raeni Bullock – photography
- Brooke Lober – photography
- Graham McGrew – photography
