= Lost Sense Recollected =

Studio album (Tape) by Elephant Micah
- Released: August 2001
- Genre: Lo-fi/indie
- Label: LRRC

Elephant Micah chronology
Lost Sense Recollected (2001)	Low Energy Dance Music (2002)

Lost Sense Recollected is lo-fi artist Elephant Micah's first official release. Released on LRRC, Micah's label, as a cassette-only release in August, 2001. The album is now available on Micah's website for purchase as mp3s.

== Track listing ==
=== Side A ===
1. "Recognize An Impending Danger"
2. "Rides Away (Postscript)"
3. "Like This:"
4. "You Take My Sense With Longing" (demo)

=== Side B ===
1. "Sawed In Two"
2. "Holy Roadway"
3. "Put to Bed" (Live)
