= Fire Escape (album) =

2007 album by Sunburned Hand of the Man

Studio album by Sunburned Hand of the Man
- Released: 2007
- Genre: Experimental / psychedelic
- Label: Smalltown Supersound
- Producer: Kieran Hebden

Professional ratings
Review scores
Source	Rating
Pitchfork Media	(7.3/10) link

Fire Escape is an album by Sunburned Hand of the Man, released in 2007 on Smalltown Supersound Records and featuring production from Kieran Hebden.
