= The Cuts =

- Origin: Oakland, California, USA
- Genres: Rock, punk rock, power pop, glam rock
- Instruments: Vocals, guitar, bass guitar, piano, keyboards, drums, percussion,
- Years active: 1998–2007
- Labels: Lookout Records, Birdman Records
- Members: Carlos Palacios, Andy Jordan, Garret Goddard, Danny James “Aa”berg, Ben Brown
- Past members: Elizabeth Dotzler, Carson Bell, Eric Von Ravenson

The Cuts were a rock band from Oakland, California.

The Cuts were formed by Carlos Palacios, Andy Jordan and Eric Johnson in 1998. Johnson left the band and Palacios, Jordan, Carson Bell, Elizabeth Dotzler and Garrett Goddard solidified this initial lineup. After winning a talent contest in 1999, the Cuts released their Heart Attack 7 on Lookout Records, "Probably the last good record that graced the Lookout label". The group went on tour with The Donnas in 1999 after which Bell left the band. The Cuts then recorded their first self-titled LP for Rock N Roll Blitzkrieg. "Danny James" Aaberg replaced Dotzler on keys in late 2000, joining original members Jordan, Palacios and Godard. In 2001, the Cuts moved to El Paso to live cheaply and work on their writing, resulting in their second LP—2 Over Ten, which began the band's five-year stint with Birdman Records. Ben Brown joined up on lead guitar for the third Cuts album. From Here On Out, released in 2006 with glowing reviews, was not enough to save The Cuts: later the same year, Danny James took his exit, and, after a couple gigs with keyboard wizard Joel Robinow, the Cuts decided to call it quits. In 2012, The Cuts reunited for select dates.

== Discography ==
- Heart Attack 7', Lookout Records, 1999
- The Cuts ST, Birdman Records, 2001
- 2 Over Ten, Birdman Records, 2003
- I'm Not Down 7', Antenna Farm Records, 2005
- From Here on Out, Birdman Records, 2006
