= The Apes =

Rock band from Washington, D.C

- Origin: Washington, D.C., U.S.
- Genres: Garage rock; Noise rock
- Years active: 1999–2010
- Labels: Frenchkiss, Birdman
- Past members: Erick Jackson; Jeff Schmid; Amanda Kleinman; Paul Weil (1999–?); Joe Halladay (?–2006); Breck Brunson (2006–2010)
- Website: www.theapes.com

The Apes (sometimes just Apes) were a noisy, guitarless garage rock foursome from Washington, D.C. The band formed in 1999 with the lineup of singer Paul Weil, keyboard player Amanda Kleinman (an Arts College advisor by day), bassist Erick Jackson, and drummer Jeff Schmid. They released their first EP themselves, two albums on the New York label Frenchkiss, and an EP on Planaria Records before moving to San Francisco's Birdman Records which released an EP and the band's third full-length album.

The band has seen its three instrumentalists remain a constant while three different men have filled the shoes of lead singer. Paul Weil left the band and was replaced by Joe Halladay, and in 2006 Halladay left the band and was replaced by the visual artist Breck Brunson, whose first recorded tracks appeared on a CD-R the band sold during its 2006 U.S. tour in support of Liars. The band's fourth full-length album, titled Ghost Games, was released in early 2008 on Gypsy Eyes Records. In 2010, three of the band members moved to Heavy Breathing.

The band members are sometimes known by the pseudonyms Lucius Twilight (Brunson), Jackie Magik (Jackson), Majestic Ape (Kleinman), Count 101 (Weil), and Ronald Wolf (Schmid).

== Discography ==
Year	Title	Format	Label
2000	Luv is Real	12" EP	Glove Music
2001	The Fugue in the Fog	CD/LP	Frenchkiss
2002	Street Warz	CD/10" vinyl EP	Planaria
2003	OddEyeSee	CD	Frenchkiss
2004	Tapestry Mastery	CD/10" vinyl EP	Birdman
2005	Baba's Mountain	CD	Birdman
2006	2006 Tour	CD-R	self-released
2008	Ghost Games	CD/LP	Gypsy Eyes
