= MV & EE =

American musical group

- Origin: MV & EE Medicine Show; The Bummer Road
- Years active: 2000–present
- Label: Ecstatic Peace!
- Members: Matt Valentine; Erika Elder
- Past members: Willie Lane; J. Mascis; Ron Schneiderman; Samara Lubelski; John Moloney; Doc Dunn; Tim Barnes; Mick Flower; Mike Smith; The Doozer; Nemo; Sparrow Wildchild; Chris Davis; Chris Corsano; Afonso Simoes; James Anderson; Mo' Jiggs; Chris Livingood; Janane Tripp; Andre Vida; Luisa Reichenheim
- Website: http://www.mvandee.blogspot.com

MV & EE is a Vermont-based group of musicians focused around partners Matt "MV" Valentine and Erika "EE" Elder. Matt Valentine was in the neo-psychedelic group The Tower Recordings and has also released music under his own name and the pseudonym, Matthew Dell. While the duo recorded under many different names, including MV & EE Medicine Show and The Bummer Road, most of the records center on both artists and feature a rotating cast of additional musicians. Their style is self-described as "lunar ragas", with many of the lyrics dealing with celestial imagery. They combine Indian raga style composition with Appalachian folk and post-psychedelic electrical experimentalism. They use Western and Eastern acoustic instruments amplified and augmented with effects such as reverb, delay, and flange. Their compositions occasionally feature vocal work from both Elder and Valentine, the latter of which is reminiscent of Neil Young's vocal style. The group have released many records, on various small labels, on their own Child of Microtones imprint (and its subsidiary Heroine Celestial Agriculture), and on Ecstatic Peace!.

Elder also plays with Valentine's newer band Wet Tuna. Valentine has released solo albums featuring Elder, such as 2011's What I Became.

== Discography ==
=== Albums ===
- Tonight! One Night Only! MV & EE In Heaven 2001 (Child of Microtones)
- Ragantula 2002 (Child of Microtones)
- Daybreak Of Cocola & The Plumage Overtones Of Black Patti 2003 (Child of Microtones)
- Fantastic String Music 2003 (Child of Microtones)
- Moon Jook 2004 (Child of Microtones)
- Cosmic Dust & The Electrobeam Hermit Thrush 2004 (Child of Microtones)
- Lunar Blues 2004 (Child of Microtones)
- The Uranian Ray 2004 (Child of Microtones/Spirit Of Orr)
- Ragas & Blues 2004 (IDEA)
- Livestock Moon Forms: Rural Ragas Volume One 2005 (Child of Microtones)
- The Light Of Cocola Octo Escapes The Golden Dawn Of Blues: Rural Ragas Volume Two 2005 (Child of Microtones)
- The Suncatcher Blossoms A Nova And Is So Grateful It Is No Longer Willing To Dark The Sun: Rural Ragas Volume Three 2005 (Child of Microtones)
- Zone of Domes 2005 (Child of Microtones)
- We Offer You Guru 2005 (Child of Microtones)
- Suncatcher Mountain 2006 (Child of Microtones)
- Mother of Thousands 2006 (Time-Lag Records)
- The Cowboy's Road 2006 (Child of Microtones)
- Play Ellas McDaniel's "Who Do You Love" 2006 (Three Lobed Recordings)
- Rural Dimensions 2006 (Child of Microtones)
- Green Blues 2007 (Ecstatic Peace)
- Goodbye Moonface 2007 (Wabana Records)
- Mars Delta 2007 (Child of Microtones)
- Eye in the Pines 2007 (Child of Microtones)
- Ragas of the Culvert: The Ground Ain't Dirty 2007 (Child of Microtones)
- Gettin' Gone 2007 (Ecstatic Peace!)
- Foxgod in Flight 2008 (Child Of Microtones)
- Pray For Less w/ Willie Lane 2008 (Blackest Rainbow)
- Total Loss Songs 2008 (Three Lobed Recordings)
- MV & EE Meet Snake's Pass & Other Human Conditions 2008 (Singing Knives)
- Drone Trailer 2009 (Dicristina Stair)
- Barn Nova 2009 (Ecstatic Peace!)
- Country Stash 2011 (Three Lobed Recordings)
- Space Homestead 2012 (Woodsist)
- Shade Grown 2013 (Blackest Rainbow)
- Alpha Lyrae 2014 (self-released)
- Root/Void 2016

=== Singles ===
- Moment Spacing / Bong Judge 2008 (Golden Lab Records)
- Old Black Joe / Huna Cosm 2008 (The Great Pop Supplement)
