= Heavy Breathing =

American rock band

- Origin: Washington, D.C., U.S.
- Genres: Dance rock; Noise rock
- Years active: 2010–present
- Labels: Dischord, Electric Cowbell Records
- Members: Erick Jackson; Jeff Schmid; Amanda Kleinman
- Website: www.heavybreathing.net

Heavy Breathing is an American rock band from Washington D.C. formed in 2010 by guitarist Erick Jackson, drummer Jeff Schmid, and keyboardist Amanda Kleinman, who were formerly in the band The Apes. They have released three albums, "Body Problems" in 2012, "Airtight" in 2015, and "C.P.R." in 2019.

The New York Times reported that Amanda Kleinman deleted her Twitter account after receiving abusive comments from those who believed in the Pizzagate conspiracy theory. In an interview with the magazine, Kleinman said "We are at a dangerous place in American culture where a good percentage of people aren’t distinguishing what is a real news source based on real reporting and fact-checking and only reinforcing pre-existing ideas they have". After receiving death threats, Kleinman took screenshots of them to report to the police.

== Discography ==
- Body Problems (2012)
- Airtight (2015)
- C.P.R. (2019)
