= The Russian Wilds =

Studio album by Howlin Rain
- Released: February 14, 2012
- Genres: Psychedelic, blues rock
- Length: 61:08
- Label: American Recordings

Howlin Rain chronology
The Good Life (2010)	The Russian Wilds (2012)	Mansion Songs (2015)

The Russian Wilds is the third full-length studio album from the blues rock band Howlin Rain, released on February 14, 2012 by American Recordings.

== Background and recording ==
The Russian Wilds took four years to make. At the request of Rick Rubin, the band wrote 150 songs. Recording took place with producer Tim Green.

== Reception ==
Professional ratings
Aggregate scores
Source	Rating
Metacritic	73/100
Review scores
Source	Rating
AllMusic	4/5 stars
Beats per Minute	76%
Consequence of Sound	C+
The Guardian	(mixed)
musicOMH	4/5 stars
NME	(4/10)
Pitchfork	(6.4/10)
The Quietus	favorable
Rolling Stone	4/5 stars
Spin	(3/10)

The Russian Wilds was met with some critical acclaim. At Metacritic, which assigns a weighted average score out of 100 to reviews and ratings from mainstream critics, the album received a metascore of 73, based on 16 reviews, indicating "generally favorable reviews". AllMusic reviewer Thom Jurek said that the album was "Howlin' Rain's most accessible recording," but noted that the "enormous ambition and musical mastery of rock & roll's mighty past make it an essential one, too." Writing for Beats per Minute, critic Johan Alm described The Russian Wilds as "one particularly fine rock record," but stated that while the record "is hardly going to shock you to the core...it's a more than able record by one of the most consistently strong groups in its genre." Consequence of Sound's Frank Mojica described The Russian Wilds as "a crash course in 70's [sic] album-oriented rock," adding that it "captures the magic of on-stage jamming, such as the psychedelic guitar solos on opener 'Self Made Man'." Critic Tom Hughes of The Guardian was not quite so impressed, stating that the band "ape the cons as well as the pros of 70s rock: longer-than-necessary songs, a weakness for cliche and, inevitably, unabashed retroism", opining that the album sounded "a bit weighed-down". In his review for musicOMH, Paul Bonadio offered the opinion that The Russian Wilds was "a complete contrast to the iTunes and MP3 market of today. As such, those looking for an eerily familiar – and often brilliant – throwback to the sounds of 1972, please enquire within" while also noting that "those seeking a band whose aim is to progress a new musical sound should tender their thoughts elsewhere."

In an unfavorable review for the NME, Ailbhe Malone described the album as "a curious hybrid", finding that it contained "proper classic rock moments, but elsewhere sounding a bit elevator music" and observing that "though Ethan Miller's vocals are impeccable, they get lost in strange metaphors and an excess of ideas." Despite saying that "at just over an hour, The Russian Wilds is too long", The Quietus's Barnaby Smith found that the album was "a marked step forward in Miller's songwriting" and found it to be "overall, a cascading and rewarding listen." Reviewer Aaron Leitko of Pitchfork Media noted that while The Russian Wilds "has all the tropes of a record-as-game-changer-- it's moody and duende-soaked, meticulously crafted, and sprawling in its ambition", the album "strives for timelessness, but sounds temporally adrift", adding that "The Russian Wilds' main failing, though, is that, in comparison to the band's concerts, it feels flat." Rolling Stone's David Fricke was more complementary, finding that the album's classic rock influences "are propelled with bracing studio clarity and hot-live gig immediacy" and saying that "the inspirations and pot-dream idealism may be retro; the zeal and momentum are not." In a review for Spin magazine, Grayson Currin described The Russian Wilds as "a terrible album, another unfortunate instance in which the world's major-label machine has failed to understand the essence of a band they've inked", observing that it "attempts to be something more than just a rock 'n' roll record. Instead...we get big-budget bloat, lifeless lines, and none of the warmth or reality that would cause any label to take interest in the first place."

== Track listing ==
All lyrics are written by Ethan Miller, except "Collage"; all music is composed by Miller, Cyrus Comisky, Raj Ojha, Joel Robinow, except where noted.

No.	Title	Writer(s)	Length
1.	"Self Made Man"	Miller, Comisky, Ojha, Robinow, Eli Eckert	8:00
2.	"Phantom in the Valley"		7:16
3.	"cannot Satisfy Me Now"		6:19
4.	"Cherokee Werewolf"		5:26
5.	"Strange Thunder"	Miller, Comisky, Ojha, Robinow, Eckert	8:53
6.	"Plex Reception" (instrumental)		0:37
7.	"Dark Side"	Miller	5:18
8.	"Beneath Wild Wings"		4:16
9.	"Collage"	Joe Walsh, Patrick Cullie	5:01
10.	"Walking Through Stone"		6:53
11.	"...Still Walking, Still Stone"		3:09

== Band members ==
- Ethan Miller – Vocals, guitar
- Raj Ojha – Drums, percussion
- Cyrus Comiskey – Bass
- Joel Robinow – Keyboard, guitar, horns, vocals
- Isaiah Mitchell – Guitar, vocals

== Credits ==
- Tim Green – producer
- Arik Roper – artwork
