= BlueSanct Records =

American record label

- Founded: 1996
- Founder: Michael Anderson
- Distributor: The Business
- Genre: Experimental, indie rock
- Country of origin: United States
- Location: Bloomington, Indiana
- Official website: www.bluesanct.com

Bluesanct Records is an independent record label located in Bloomington, Indiana, and run by Michael (Mkl) Anderson, who records experimental music for the label under the Drekka moniker. Other artists include Elephant Micah, Vollmar, and Caethua. Alumni include Low, Rivulets, Static Films, and The Iditarod.

== See also ==
- List of record labels
