= Brattleboro Free Folk Festival =

Music festival

Coordinates: 42.8526°N 72.5582°W

The Brattleboro Free Folk Festival is an American annual music festival which takes place in Brattleboro, Vermont. The festival began in 2003 and is considered part of the New Weird America music movement.
