= Six Organs of Admittance =

Solo music project by Ben Chasny

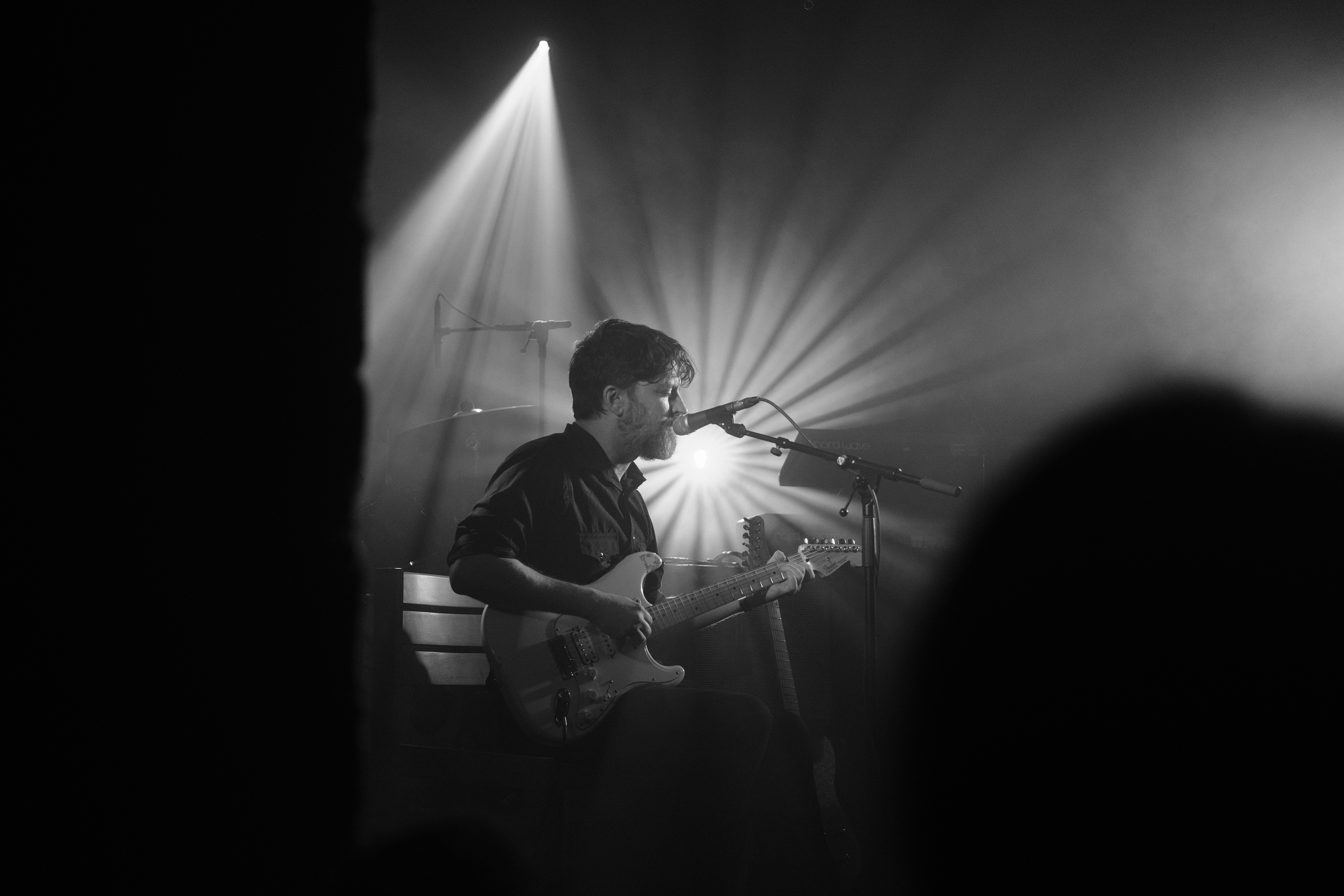
Six Organs of Admittance at Point Éphémère in Paris, 2016

Six Organs of Admittance is the primary musical project of American guitarist Ben Chasny. Chasny's music is largely guitar-based and is often considered new folk; however, it includes obvious influences, marked by the use of drones, chimes, and eclectic percussive elements. He records albums for Drag City and Holy Mountain, among other labels.

Chasny is also a member of the psychedelic band Comets on Fire, and has working relationships with Badgerlore, Current 93, and Magik Markers. His newest project is Rangda with Richard Bishop of Sun City Girls and Six Organs contributor Chris Corsano. Six Organs of Admittance has also released a song exclusively on the 2004 new folk compilation record The Golden Apples of the Sun. The album's compiler Devendra Banhart has stated this song comes from a fully produced but unreleased Chasny album he refers to as the "solo record," a bootleg of which circulates the internet.

== Discography ==
=== Studio albums ===
Year	Title
1998	Six Organs of Admittance
1999	Nightly Trembling
2000	Dust and Chimes
2002	Dark Noontide
2003	Compathia
2003	For Octavio Paz
2004	The Manifestation
2005	School of the Flower
2006	The Sun Awakens
2007	Shelter from the Ash
2009	Luminous Night
2011	Asleep on the Floodplain
2011	Maria Kapel
2012	Ascent
2015	Hexadic
2015	Hexadic II
2017	Burning the Threshold
2020	Companion Rises
2021	The Veiled Sea
2024	Time Is Glass
2024	Jinxed by Being (with Shackleton)

=== Singles & EPs ===
Year	Title
2000	Invitation to the SR for Supper 8"
2000	Somewhere Between Her shoulder and God 7"
2000	The Manifestation 12"
2002	You Can Always See the Sun EP
2005	The Honeycreeper Smiles 7"
2012	Parsons' Blues 7"

=== Splits ===
Year	Title
2003	Trighplane Terraforms No.1 Split
2004	Stephanie Volkmar/Six Organs of Admittance Split
2006	7" split w / Om

=== Compilations ===
Year	Title
2009	RTZ

=== Live ===
Year	Title
2006	Days of Blood

=== Other ===
Year	Title
2007	Proem to Empty the Sun
2008	Goatflower
2009	Empty the Sun
2018	Hexadic III
