= Chris Corsano =

American drummer

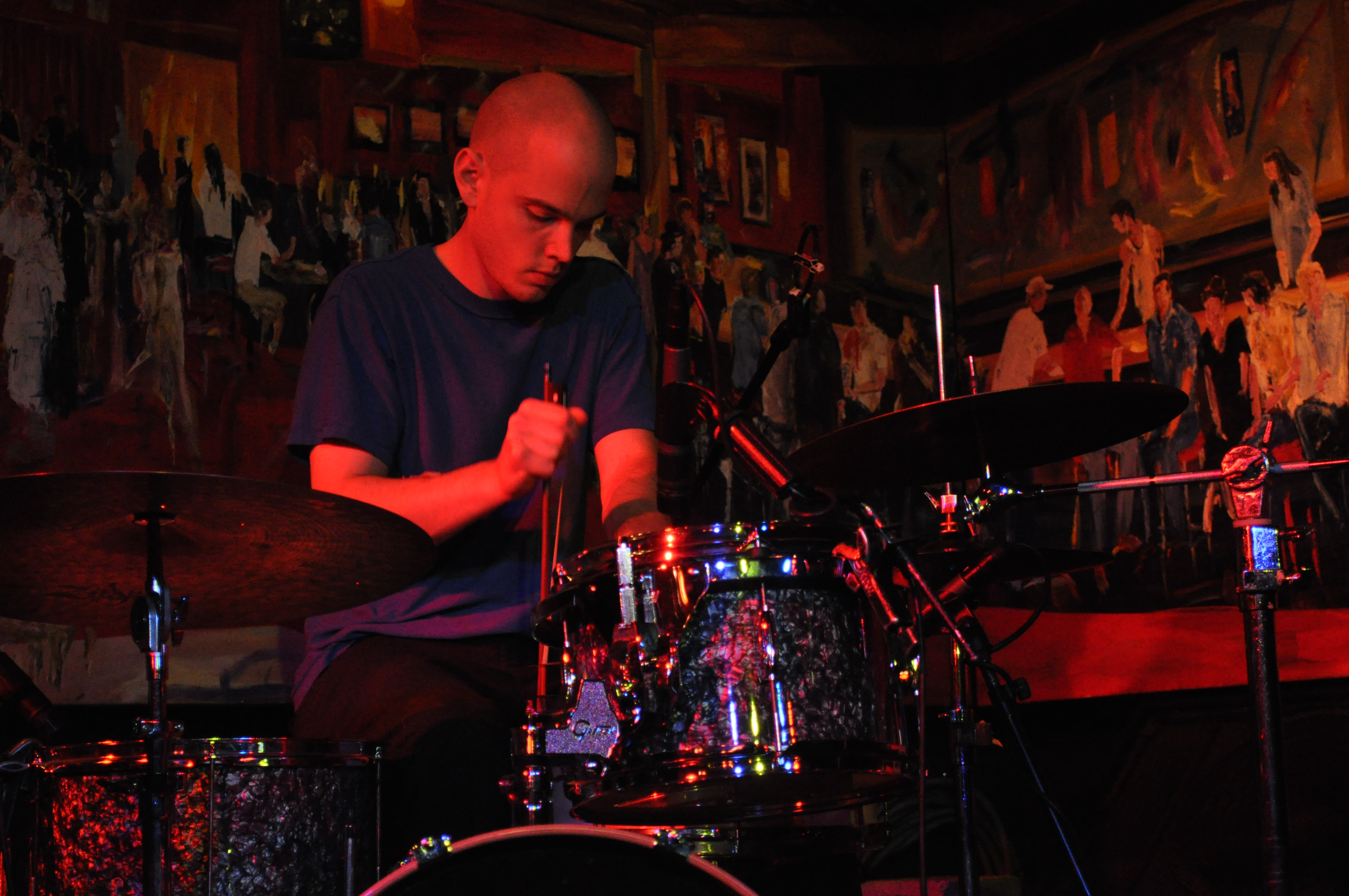

Background information
- Born: 1975 (age 50–51); Englewood, New Jersey, United States
- Instrument: Drums

Chris Corsano is an American improviser based in Chicago, Illinois.

== Early life ==
Corsano picked up the drums after seeing his half-brother Tony playing. Corsano's first drum set had Animal from the Muppets on the bass, and he largely is self-taught, tapping along to a boom box. Capt. Beefheart, the Minutemen, and Mitch Mitchell served as early influences, depriving Corsano of a desire for pristine technique.

"As long as there are basements in Northern New Jersey, there will be cheap, used and fucked-up drum sets available to young upstarts who don't know any better, from men with thin mustaches and cut off jeans," Corsano says about his childhood.

== Career ==
Corsano has performed with artists including Björk (on the studio recording and world tour for Volta), Evan Parker, Sunburned Hand of the Man, Six Organs of Admittance, Dredd Foole, Bill Orcutt, Kim Gordon, Thurston Moore, Jim O'Rourke, Jandek, Matt Valentine, Nels Cline, Vibracathedral Orchestra, Cold Bleak Heat, Michael Flower, C. Spencer Yeh, Mette Rasmussen, John Edwards, Sylvie Courvoisier, Okkyung Lee, and Nate Wooley.

Corsano has performed with saxophonist Paul Flaherty for more than twenty years and on more than twenty records in a style they call "The Hated Music." He has also recorded several albums each with Rangda (trio with Sir Richard Bishop and Ben Chasny), Chikamorachi (duo with Darin Gray), and Vampire Belt (duo with Bill Nace).

Corsano received a Foundation for Contemporary Arts Grants to Artists award in 2017.

== Discography ==
=== Solo ===
Year	Artist	Album	Label
2006	Chris Corsano	The Young Cricketer	Hot Cars Warp
2006	Chris Corsano	Blood Pressure	Hot Cars Warp
2009	Chris Corsano	Another Dull Dawn	Ultra Eczema
2010	Chris Corsano Band	High and Dry	Hot Cars Warp
2012	Chris Corsano	Cut	Hot Cars Warp
2018	Levin/Haker Flaten/Corsano	Spinning Jenny	Trost
2018	Corsano/Nace/Baczkowski	Mystic Beings	Open Mouth
2018	Rasmussen/Corsano	A View Of The Moon (From The Sun)	Clean Feed
2018	Corsano/Orcutt	Brace Up!	
2018	Amado/McPhee/Kessler/ Corsano	A History of Nothing	Trost
2018	Masmussen/Flaherty/ Corsano	Star-Spangled Voltage	Hot Cars Warp
2019	Alcorn/Corsano/Nace	Live At Rotunda	Open Mouth
2019	Coxhill/McPhee/Corsano/ Parker	Tree Dancing	Otoroku
2019	Amado/Corsano	No Place to Fall	Monofonous / Astral
2019	Corsano/Orcutt	The Dwarfs of East Agouza	Electric Smog
2019	Baczkowski/Lopez/Corsano	Old Smoke	Relative Pitch
2019	Adbelnour/Corsano	Quand Fond La Neige, Ou Va Le Blanc?	Relative Pitch
2020	Chris Corsano	QuaranTunes Series no. 003	Feeding Tube
2020	Chris Corsano	Mezzaluna	Catalytic
2020	Genta/Corsano	The Live In Lisbon	8mm
2021	Amado/McPhee/ Kessler/Corsano	Let The Free Be Men	Trost Records
2021	Corsano/Maranha/Youngs	Corsano/Maranha/Youngs	Improved Sequence
2022	Corsano/Walker/Young	Belladonna Garnish	Husky Pants
2023	Stoffner/Butcher/Corsano	Braids	ezz-thetics
2023	Nalbandian/Corsano	A Spontaneous Breaking of Symmetry I	self-released
2023	Amba/Corsano/Orcutt	The Flower School	Palilalia
2023	Corsano/Orcutt	Play At Duke	Palilalia
2023	Swell/McPhee/Corsano	Sometimes The Air Is	Mahakala
2023	Rasmussen/Flaherty/ Rowden/Corsano	Crying in Space	Relative Pitch
2024	Butcher/Stoffner/Corsano	The Glass Changes Shape	Relative Pitch
2024	Nabandian/Corsano	A Spontaneous Breaking of Symmetry III	self-released
2024	Corsano/Corsano	The Key (Became The Important Thing [& Then Just Faded Away])	Drag City
2024	Corsano/Orcutt	Live at Big Ears	Palilalia Records
2024	Nalbandian/Corsano	A Spontaneous Breaking of Symmetry II	self-released
2024	Williams/Gray/Corsano	Elastic	Corbett v. Dempsey
2024	Sakata/O'Rourke/ Rasmussen/Corsano	Live at Superdeluxe Vol. 1	Trost Records
2024	Corsano/Orcutt	Made Out of Sound	Palilalia Records
