= Paul Flaherty (musician) =

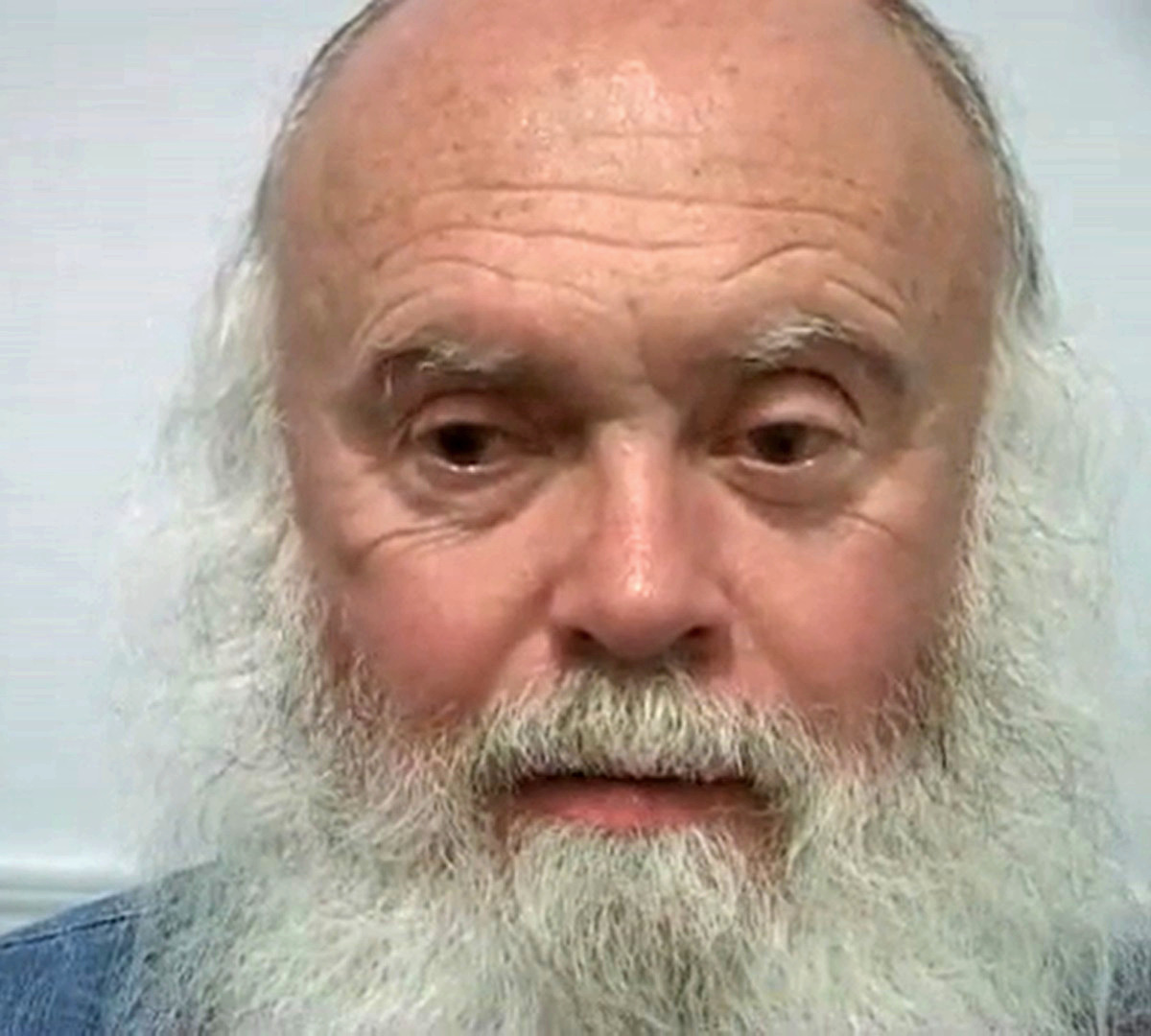
- Flaherty in music is (Speaking Portraits) (Vol. I)

Background information
- Origin: Hartford, Connecticut
- Genres: free improvisation, free jazz, avant-garde
- Instrument: saxophone
- Labels: Ecstatic Peace!, Cadence, Econore, Important, Feeding Tube, Relative Pitch, Family Vineyard, Wet Paint
- Website: https://paulflahertyhatedmusic.bandcamp.com/

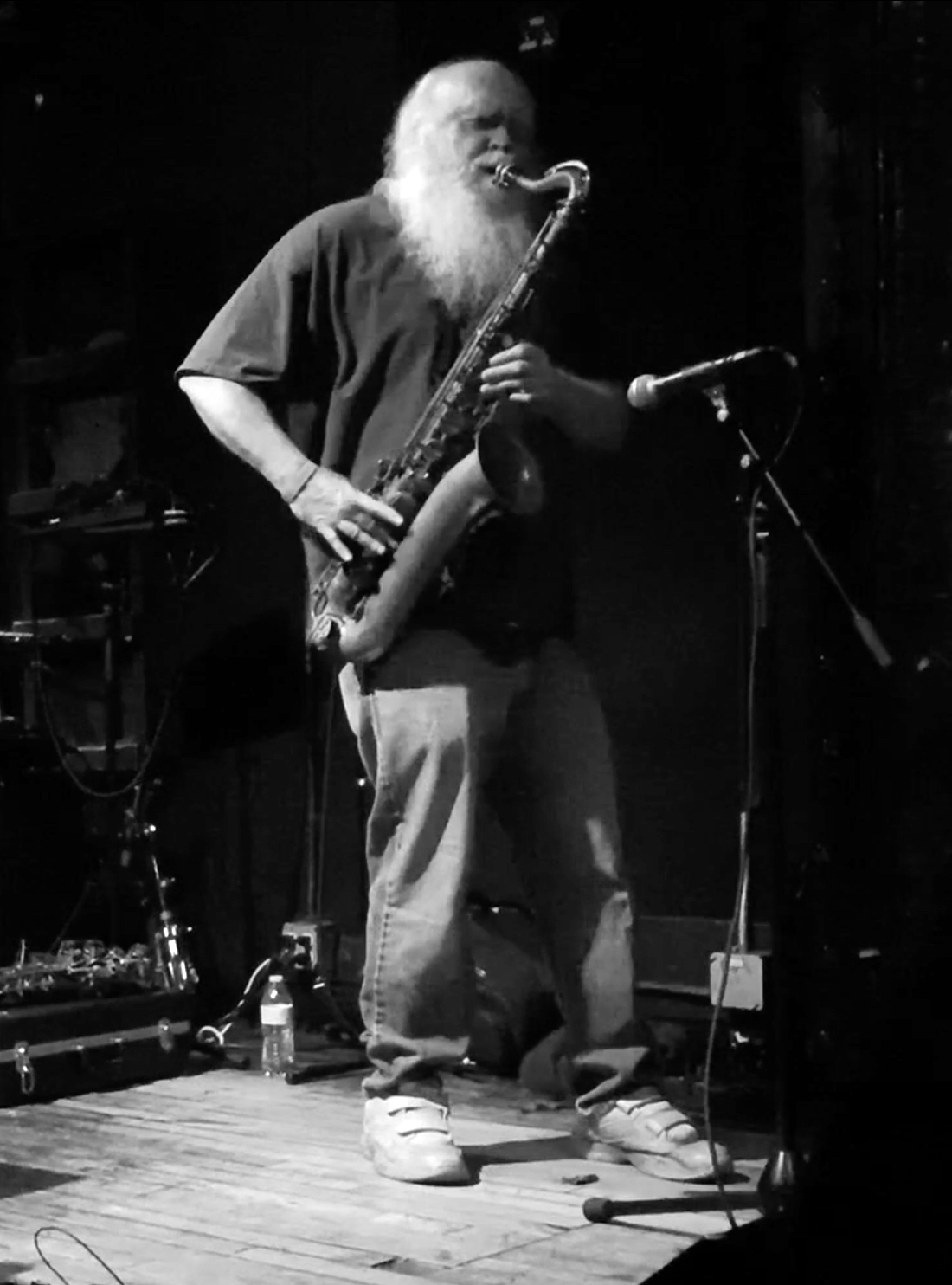
Paul Flaherty at Union Pool in Brooklyn in 2020

Paul Flaherty (born November 6, 1948, Hartford, Connecticut) is an American jazz saxophonist who plays primarily in free improvisational idioms.

Flaherty began playing saxophone at age 10, focusing initially on alto sax, though he would later perform on tenor and soprano saxophone as well. He worked in the bands of John Ciffirelli and Gordon Cohen in the early 1970s, but received negative responses to his style, and instead began self-releasing albums. His first album as a leader was issued in 1978, and in the 1980s he played jazz part-time, working as a house painter. He began what grew into a long-term musical partnership with Randall Colbourne in 1988, releasing a series of albums together that included guest musicians such as Chris Corsano, Richard Downs, Marc Edwards, Jim Hunt, Greg Kelley, Mike Murray, and Steve Scholz.

== Discography ==
=== As leader or co-leader ===
- Impact with Randall Colbourne, Stephen Scholz (Cadence, 1990)
- Primal Burn with Randall Colbourne, Richard Downs (Tulpa, 1991)
- The Fourth Way with Randall Colbourne, Stephen Scholz, Richard Downs (Tulpa, 1992)
- Cydonia with Randall Colbourne, Stephen Scholz, Mike Murray (Tulpa, 1993)
- Fat Onions with Randall Colbourne (Cadence, 1994)
- Visitants with Randall Colbourne (Zaabway, 1995)
- Third Rail with Randall Colbourne, Richard Downs (Zaabway Music, 1996)
- Resonance with Randall Colbourne, Daniel Carter, Raphe Malik, Sabir Mateen (Zaabway, 1997)
- Anahad with Randall Colbourne (Cadence, 1999)
- The Hated Music with Chris Corsano (Ecstatic Yod, 2000
- Prana with Randall Colbourne, Richard Downs (Zaabway, 2001)
- The Ilya Tree with Greg Kelley, John Voigt, Laurence Cook (Boxholder, 2001)
- Sannyasi with Greg Kelley, Chris Corsano (Wet Paint, 2002)
- Voices (Wet Paint, 2003)
- Cold Bleak Heat, It's Magnificent, but It Isn't War with Chris Corsano, Greg Kelley, Matt Heyner (Family Vineyard, 2005)
- Steel Sleet (Tyyfus, 2005)
- Kaivalya Vol. 1 with Marc Edwards (Cadence, 2005)
- The Dim Bulb with Steve Baczkowski, Chris Corsano (Wet Paint, 2005)
- Snow Blind Avalanche with Chris Corsano, C. Spencer Yeh (Important, 2006)
- A Rock in the Snow with Chris Corsano, C. Spencer Yeh (Important, 2006)
- Whirl of Nothingness (Family Vineyard, 2006)
- The Beloved Music with Chris Corsano (Family Vineyard, 2006)
- Cold Bleak Heat, Simitu with Chris Corsano, Greg Kelley, Matt Heyner (Family Vineyard, 2007)
- Unmuzzled Ox (Manhand, 2007)
- Aria Nativa (Family Vineyard, 2008)
- Bridge Out! with Randall Colbourne (Family Vineyard, 2008)
- New York Nuts and Boston Baked Beans with Greg Kelley, C. Spencer Yeh (Important, 2009)
- An Airless Field with Bill Nace (Ecstatic Peace!, 2010)
- Broken Staircase with Bill Nace (Wet Paint, 2011)
- No, the Sun Open Mouth with Bill Nace (Open Mouth, 2011)
- Low Cost Space Flights with Chris Corsano (Feeding Tube, 2014)
- Ironic Havoc with Randall Colbourne (Relative Pitch, 2014)
- Dragonfly Breath III: Live at the Stone with Steve Swell, Weasel Walter, C. Spencer Yeh (Not Two, 2016)
- The Dull Blade with Steve Baczkowski, Chris Corsano (Feeding Tube, 2017)
- Dead Centipedes with Randall Colbourne, James Chumley Hunt (Econore, 2020)
