= Ben Chasny =

American guitarist

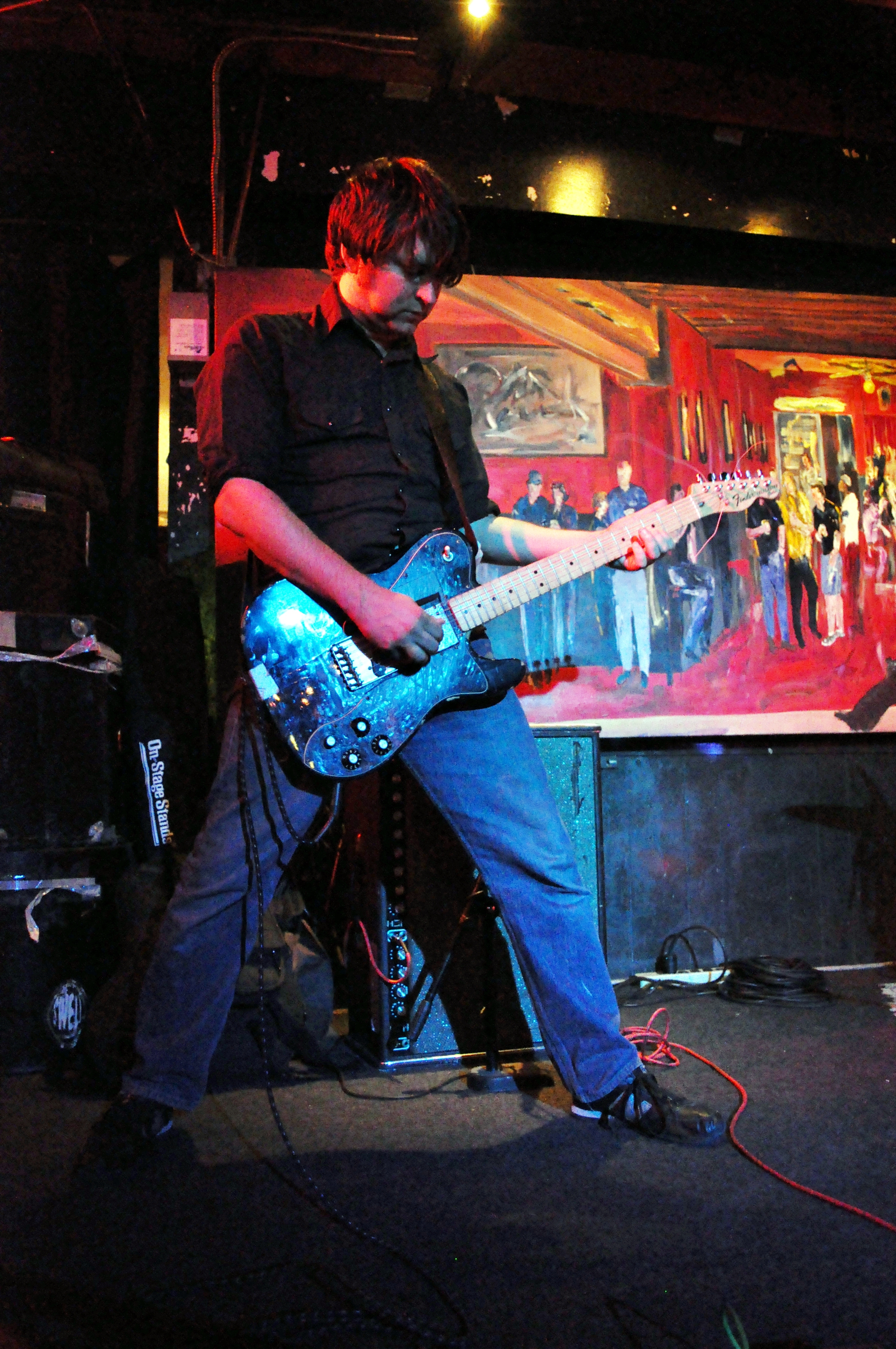

Background information
- Genres: Indie rock, psychedelic folk, psychedelic rock
- Instrument: Guitar
- Years active: 1996–present
- Labels: Holy Mountain, Drag City

Ben Chasny is an American indie rock and psychedelic folk guitarist. His primary projects are Six Organs of Admittance (his solo psych folk project) and Comets on Fire (a psychedelic rock band).

== Biography ==
Chasny made his recording debut in 1996 with his heavy, free rock project Plague Lounge on The Wicker Image, an LP released conjointly between the New World of Sound and Holy Mountain labels. Holy Mountain went on to become the "home" of many of his releases under the Six Organs of Admittance moniker. He has also released an album with Hiroyuki Usui under the name August Born.

Chasny has lent his talents to other projects such as Badgerlore, Double Leopards, Current 93, Magik Markers, and a duo with Dredd Foole, both in live performance and studio albums. More recent musical projects of his include the avant-folk trio Rangda (along with guitarist Richard Bishop and drummer Chris Corsano) and the more melodic and conventional 200 Years with Magik Markers' Elisa Ambrogio.

== Discography ==
- The Wicker Image (1996, New World of Sound/ Holy Mountain)
