= Time-Lag Records =

Record label

- Country of origin: United States
- Location: Portland, Maine

Time-Lag Records is an independent record label based in Portland, Maine.

It has released albums by artists such as Phantom Buffalo, Elephant Micah, Fursaxa, MV+EE and the Bummer Road, Death Chants, Six Organs of Admittance, Wooden Wand, Charalambides, Espers, The Tower Recordings, Drona Parva, GHQ, Big Blood and others.

Time-Lag's releases tend to be in the acid folk, psychedelic folk, and New Weird America genres. Most albums are released in limited editions of 1000 or less, usually pressed on vinyl. Time-Lag has also released a number of limited-run CD-Rs.

Time-Lag Records also acts as a distributor for other independent labels who release music in a similar genre, including Chocolate Monk, Digitalis, and Eclipse Records.

== See also ==
- List of record labels
