= Birdman Records =

Independent music label

- Founded: 2000
- Founder: David Katznelson
- Country of origin: United States
- Location: South San Francisco, California
- Official website: www.birdmanrecords.com

Birdman Records is an independent record label based in South San Francisco, California, that was founded in 2000 by David Katznelson, former A&R vice president of Warner Bros. Records.

== History ==
Birdman Records is the flagship label of the Birdman Recording Group, which includes Sepia Tone Records, Tornado Records, and Tariff Records. The label was founded in 2000 after the departure of David Katznelson from Warner Bros. Records.

In addition to its focus on particular artists, the label produced More Oar: A Tribute to the Skip Spence Album, a 1999 tribute album to the late Skip Spence, featuring contributions from Robert Plant, Beck and Tom Waits, among others, with the objective at the time of funding Spence's medical care. Spence died shortly before the release of the record, but is reported to have heard some or all of it prior to his death. Katznelson was the executive producer of the album.

== Roster ==
- A.D A.K.A Club V.I.P
- Apache
- The Apes
- Boredoms
- Brother JT
- Ralph Carney
- The Cuts
- Charlie Dee
- The Electric Prunes
- Foetus
- Paula Frazer
- John Frusciante
- Brian Glaze
- The Gris Gris
- Branman Howe
- Howlin Rain
- Jacuzzi Woodside
- Modey Lemon
- The Nice Boys
- PFFR
- The Spider Bags
- The Time Flys
- Othar Turner
- Young Jazz Giants

== See also ==
- List of record labels
