= Acid Mothers Temple discography =

Discography of Japanese rock band

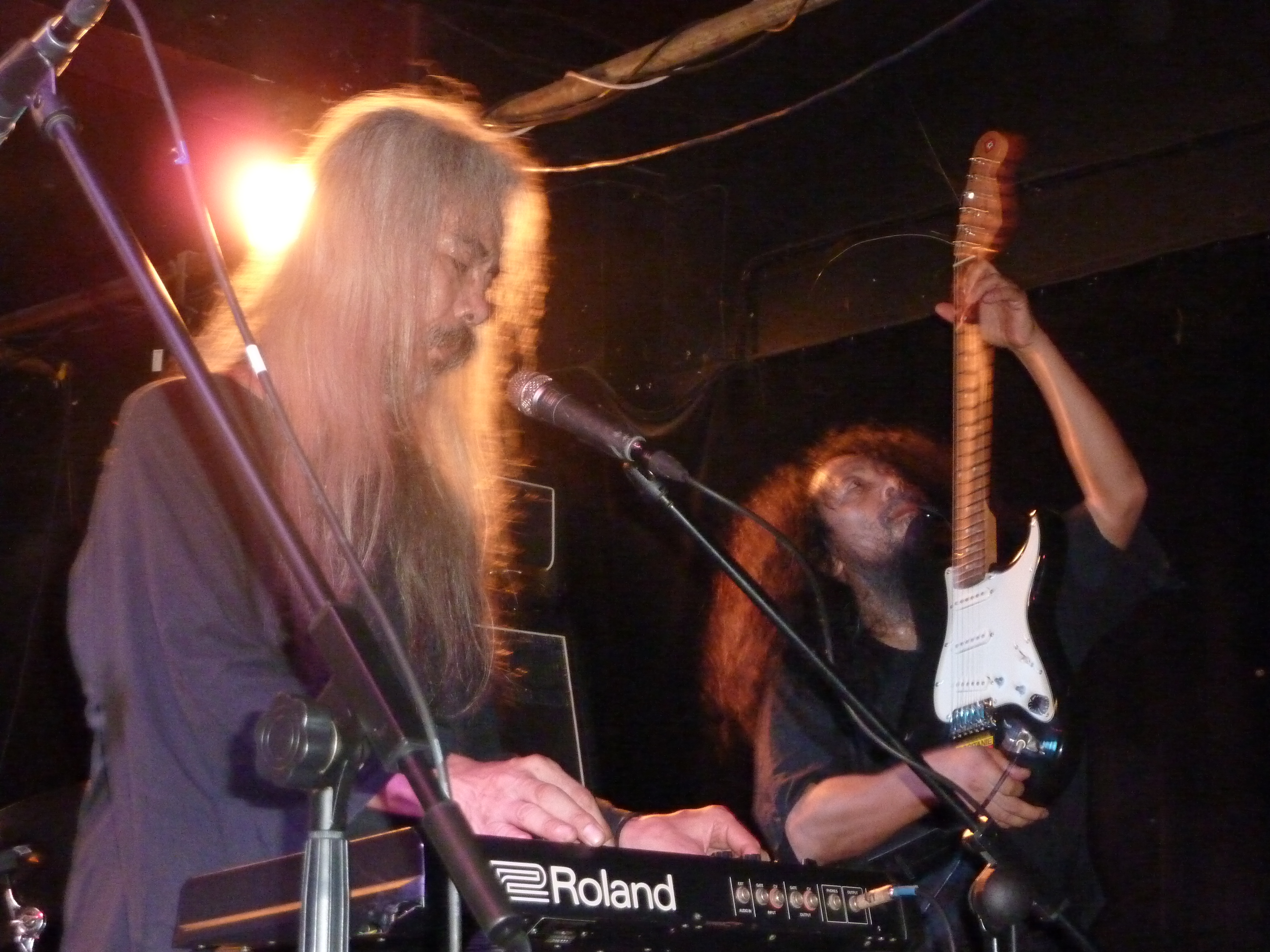
- Studio albums: 102
- EPs: 9
- Live albums: 57
- Compilation albums: 6
- Singles: 9
- Video albums: 8

This is a discography of Japanese rock band Acid Mothers Temple & the Melting Paraiso U.F.O. and related projects.

Acid Mothers Temple have in their two-decade existence recorded far more head-melting music than any sane person would know what to do with.

— David Bennun

== Acid Mothers Temple & the Melting Paraiso U.F.O. ==
=== Studio albums ===
Year	Date	Title	Label	Notes
1996	April	Acid Mother's Temple & The Melting Paraiso U.F.O.	Acid Mothers Temple	Cassette release only
1996		Freak Out	La Musica Records	Cassette release only
1997	February	Acid Mothers Temple & The Melting Paraiso U.F.O. 1	Acid Mothers Temple	Cassette release only
1997	February	Acid Mothers Temple & The Melting Paraiso U.F.O. 2	Acid Mothers Temple	Cassette release only
1997	November 25	Acid Mothers Temple & the Melting Paraiso U.F.O.	P.S.F. Records	
1999	March 25	Pataphysical Freak Out MU!!	P.S.F. Records	
1999	May	Live + Studio	Acid Mothers Temple	
1999	November	Wild Gals A Go-Go	Acid Mothers Temple	
2000	September 25	Troubadours from Another Heavenly World	P.S.F.	
2000	October	La Nòvia	Eclipse	Remastered reissue with additional version recorded live in NYC 5 April 2016 - Bam Balam Records, November 2016
2001	February	Absolutely Freak Out (Zap Your Mind!!)	Static Caravan-Resonant	
2001	June 13	New Geocentric World of Acid Mothers Temple	Squealer	Remastered cassette reissue Eye Vybe Records, May 13, 2020
2001	October	In C	Eclipse	
2002		41st Century Splendid Man	tUMULt	
2002	October 6	Electric Heavyland	Alien8	
2002		Univers Zen ou de zéro à zéro	Fractal	
2002		St. Captain Freak Out & the Magic Bamboo Request	Ektro	
2003		A Thousand Shades of Grey	FünfUndVierzig	with Escapade
2003	October 7	Kinski / Acid Mothers Temple	Sub Pop	with Kinski
2004	April	Hypnotic Liquid Machine from the Golden Utopia	Acid Mothers Temple	
2004	April 26	Mantra of Love	Alien8	
2004	September 20	The Penultimate Galactic Bordello Also the World You Made	Dirter	
2004	October 5	Does the Cosmic Shepherd Dream of Electric Tapirs?	Space Age	
2004	November 8	Minstrel in the Galaxy	Riot Season	
2004	November 20	Close Encounters of the Mutants	Multikulti	
2006	June 13	Have You Seen the Other Side of the Sky?	Ace Fu	
2006	November 27	Myth of the Love Electrique	Riot Season	
2007	February 28	Japan Tour 2007	Acid Mothers Temple	with Träd, Gräs & Stenar
2007	May 29	Crystal Rainbow Pyramid Under the Stars	Important	
2007	June 19	Nam Myo Ho Ren Ge Kyo	Ace Fu	
2007	November 19	Acid Motherly Love	Riot Season	
2007	December	41st Century Splendid Man Returns	Essence	
2008	May 13	Recurring Dream and Apocalypse of Darkness	Important	
2008	November 11	Glorify Astrological Martyrdom	Important	
2008	December 9	Cometary Orbital Drive	Bam Balam	
2009	April 28	Interstellar Guru and Zero	Homeopathic	
2009	May 5	Lord of the Underground: Vishnu and the Magic Elixir	Alien8	
2009	June 2	Are We Experimental?	Prophase	
2009	June 23	Dark Side of the Black Moon: What Planet Are We On?	Important	
2010	April 27	In 0 to ∞	Important	
2010	December 6	Stearica Invade Acid Mothers Temple and the Melting Paraiso U.F.O.	Homeopathic	with Stearica
2011	April 5	Pink Lady Lemonade ~ You're From Inner Space	Alien8	Cassette reissue with bonus track, Eye Vybe Records, September 21, 2020
2011	October 31	The Ripper at the Heaven's Gates of Dark	Riot Season	
2012	June 28	Son of a Bitches Brew	Important	
2012	November 12	IAO Chant from the Melting Paraiso Underground Freak Out	Riot Season	
2013	March 15	Cometary Orbital Drive to 2199	Nod and Smile	
2013	May 28	In Search of the Lost Divine Arc	Important	
2014	May	Astrorgasm from the Inner Space	Important	
2015	May 26	Benzaiten	Important	
2016	April 8	Wake to a New Dawn of Another Astro Era	Important	
2016	August 20	Pink Lady Lemonade (You're So Sweet)	Kamikaze Tapes	Limited edition of 65 cassettes. This is the version that appears on the 2002 compilation Do Whatever You Want, Don't Do Whatever You Don't Want!!
2017	November 3	Those Who Came Never Before	Nod and Smile Records	
2017	November 17	Wandering the Outer Space	Buh Records	
2018	January 17	Either The Fragmented Body Or The Reconstituted Soul	Necio	
2018	April 13	Electric Dream Ecstasy	Essence	
2018	June 29	Hallelujah Mystic Garden Part 1	Important	
2018	October	Paralyzed Brain	Offset	
2018	October	Sacred and Inviolable Phase Shift	Bam Balam	
2018	October 31	Psychedelic Battles - Volume Five	Vincebus Eruptum	Split with Lee Van Cleef (Psychedelic rock group from Naples, Italy). Limited edition 300 copies on yellow vinyl. AMT's contribution "Flying Teapot" also appears on the CD and download but not vinyl version of Reverse of Rebirth in Universe
2018	November 22	Trails to the Cosmic Vibrations	Ujikaji Records	with The Observatory
2018	November 30	Reverse of Rebirth in Universe	Riot Season	
2019	February	Kinski ∞ Acid Mothers Temple & The Melting Paraiso U.F.O.	Acid Mothers Temple	with Kinski
2019	April	How Was The Decisive Moment Recorded?	Max Hazard Records	Original release as two-track vinyl album with monochrome artwork. CD released July 2019 with additional tracks and coloured artwork
2019	April 13	Invisible Eyes And Phantom Cathedral	Bam Balam	Record Store Day 2019 vinyl release. Contains only the title track in two parts, previously included in the CD but not the vinyl release of Sacred and Inviolable Phase Shift. Limited edition of 500 black, 200 clear
2019	April 26	Hallelujah Mystic Garden Part Two	Important	
2020	March	Pink Lady Lemonade (Double Sweet Sucker Punch)	Acid Mothers Temple	Also vinyl release on Max Hazard Records
2020	April 10	Reverse Of Rebirth Reprise	Nod and Smile	Featuring Geoff Leigh
2020	May 15	Chosen Star Child's Confession	Riot Season	Featuring Geoff Leigh. Originally scheduled for April 24 release, postponed owing to covid-19 pandemic
2020	October 31	Voices from Ghostwood	UFO Real	Limited edition 111 copies CDr and 36 copies microcassette
2022	January 3	Demi-Demonaic Daemoog	AKTI Records	Limited edition 200 copies
2024	May 9	Holy Black Mountain Side	Rolling Heads	

=== EPs ===
Year	Date	Title	Label	Notes
2001	May	Monster of the Universe	Static Caravan-Resonant	
2001	September	Grateful Head / Whopping Wild Freaks	Wabana	
2001	October	'We Are Here' UK Tour October 2001	Caravan-Resonant	split with Nishinihon
2002		Electric Love Machine	Fractal	
2002	November	The Tombstone Phantom Drifter	Verdura	split with Circle
2004		Hello Good Child	Ochre	

=== Singles ===
Year	Date	Title	Label	Notes
2003	January 7	Ziggy Sitar Dust Raga	Important	
2003	February 4	Diamond Doggy Peggy	Important	
2003	March 4	Cosmic Funky Dolly	Important	
2015	January 8	Sign of Benzaiten / Apophenia	God Unknown	split with Anthroprophh
2017	May 12	Sycamore Trees / Just You	Self Sabotage	split with ST 37
2019	May 10	From Planet Orb With Love Part 1 / Hey Bud, How's Your Blood?	Whiteworm	split with Orphan Goggles

=== Live albums ===
Year	Date	Title	Label	Notes
2000	July	Live in Occident	Detector	
2000	November	In WFMU 2000	Acid Mothers Temple	
2002		Born to Be Wild in the USA 2000	Wabana	
2002	October	Live in Japan	Acid Mothers Temple	
2002	December	USA	Acid Mothers Temple	
2002	December	UK No. 1	Acid Mothers Temple	
2002	December	UK No. 2	Acid Mothers Temple	
2003	November	Last Concert in Tokyo	Acid Mothers Temple	
2003		The Day Before the Sky Fell in America Sept 10, 2001	Galactic Zoo Disc	Vinyl LP. Remastered and reissued on CD in 2006 as The Day Before The Sky Fell In with different artwork, updated credits and alternative song titles
2004	April	In G	Time-Lag	with Ultrasound. 'Invisible' 10" clear vinyl, no labels, dry letterpressed transparent film covers, limited to 600 copies.
2004		The Night Before the Sky Fell in America Sept 10, 2001	Mandarinas	
2005	October 21	Goodbye John Peel: Live in London 2004	Dirter	
2006	April	Power House of Holy	Acid Mothers Temple	
2007	November	Acid Mothership Live	Acid Mothers Temple	
2010	January 16	Acid Mothers Temple Festival Vol. 7	Acid Mothers Temple	with Ichiraku Yoshimitsu
2011	June	Live as a Troubadour	Important	
2012	March 14	2010: A Space Ritual	Acid Mothers Temple	with Kido Natsuki
2013	13 October	Birmingham Flapper & Firkin, May 29th 2001	Jesus Juice	Limited edition of 50 CDr handed out free at Birmingham Flapper gig 13 October 2013
2014	April 23	The Unlimited Dream Cloister	FM3	
2014	August 25	Live in Tolosa	Bam Balam	with Rosina de Pèira
2015	March 10	High on New Heaven, Live in New Haven	Safety Meeting	
2015		Live in North Carolina 2015	none	CDr sold on UK & Europe Tour October–November 2015
2015	November 8	Live in Castellón	Discos Mascarpone	Limited edition of 40 cassettes
2015	December	You Can't Do That on the Radio Anymore	Chaotic Noise	
2015	December	Hare & Hounds, Birmingham, UK, 2011.11.05	Grumpy's Third Eye Lives	
2016	March	Last Concert of the First Chapter	Acid Mother Temple	
2016	September	Live at Cabaret Victoria 2016	none	Limited edition CDr only for European tour 2016
2017	April 1	On the Night of Destruction	Eyevybe	cassette, recorded 20 December 2016
2017	April	Astro Infinity Discothèque	Acid Mothers Temple	with Pika
2018	Mar	The Man Who Fell To Us Live In Nagoya 2017	Acid Mothers Temple	
2018	April 1	The Night He Fell To Us	Eyevybe	cassette in limited edition of 100 for 2018 North American Tour March 31-May 9, 2018, recorded 9 December 2017
2019	April 1	Who Does The Space Troubadour Sing For?	Eyevybe	cassette first edition of 100, recorded 19 February 2019
2020	April 1	Diend Of Fiend or Unstoppable Moonsault	Eyevybe	cassette, recorded 17 December 2019
2021	August 6	Love The Bomb From Uranus	Acid Mothers Temple	
2022		Live Rebootleg in Pangea	Acid Mothers Temple	Recorded 14th Aug. 2022
2024	April 20	A Dream Of Strange Desires Wrapped Inside A Noise	Bam Balam	recorded live 25th October 2019 and overdubbed September 2023
2024	May 3	Shall We Return To Outer Space?	Acid Mothers Temple	recorded 9th December 2023. Not currently listed on any Acid Mothers Temple website. Release date inferred from Facebook post by Kawabata Makoto on April 16, 2024 stating "Acid Mothers Temple's new live album "Shall We Return To Outer Space?" available on next Bandcamp Friday or our shows of European Tour from 8th May!". The next Bandcamp Friday was May 3rd
2026	May 1	The Whistle of The Galaxy Can Be Heard	Max Hazard Records	Feat. Tomo

=== Compilation albums ===
Year	Date	Title	Label	Notes
2002		Do Whatever You Want, Don't Do Whatever You Don't Want!!	Earworm	also includes various related projects
2003		Magical Power from Mars	Important	
2007	November 26	The Early Acid Mothers Temple Recordings 1995–1997	Synesthetic	
2009	December	Zenkyokushuu (全曲集)	Yokotin Label	
2013	November 20	A Young Person's Guide to Acid Mother's Temple	Donburi Disk	
2014	September	The Psychedelic Fiction Sauce Book	White Wabbit	

=== Video albums ===
Year	Date	Title	Label	Notes
2007		Dokonan: Acid Mothers Temple on Tour in US	Acid Mothers Temple	
2007	December	Acid Mothers Temple Festival Vol. 5: Live at Tokuzo Nagoya Dec. 2006	Acid Mothers Temple	with Mani Neumeier and Kuriyama Jun
2008		Never Ending Space Ritual: History of Acid Mothers Temple & the Melting Pariaso UFO	Swordfish	

== Acid Maso Temple ==
=== Studio albums ===
Year	Date	Title	Label	Note
2011		The Electric Kool-aide Results	White Noise	split with Kill Kill Kill

== Acid Mothers Afrirampo ==
=== Studio albums ===
Year	Date	Title	Label
2005	December	We Are Acid Mothers Afrirampo!	Acid Mothers Temple

== Acid Mothers Gong ==
=== Studio albums ===
Year	Date	Title	Label	Note
2004		Acid Motherhood	Voiceprint	released as Gong

=== Live albums ===
Year	Date	Title	Label
2006		Live in Nagoya	Vivo
2006		Acid Mothers Gong Live Tokyo	Voiceprint

=== Video albums ===
Year	Date	Title	Label
2008		Acid Mothers Gong Live @ Uncon 06	Voiceprint

== Acid Mothers Guru Guru ==
=== Studio albums ===
Year	Date	Title	Label
2007	September 18	Psychedelic Navigator	Important
2021	June 12	Tokugoya	Bam Balam

=== Live albums ===
Year	Date	Title	Label
2009		Underdogg Express	Fünfundvierzig

== Acid Mothers Guru Guru Gong ==
=== Singles ===
Year	Date	Title	Label
2013	December	Pink Lady Lemonade (Sticky Tongue Dada Licks) Part 1 & 2	Bam Balam

== Acid Mothers Kaidan ==
=== Video albums ===
Year	Date	Title	Label
2008	October 31	Kill the King of Noise	Alchemy Music Store

== Acid Mothers Temple & Space Paranoid ==
=== Studio albums ===
Year	Date	Title	Label
2013	November 12	Black Magic Satori	Safety Meeting

=== Live albums ===
Year	Date	Title	Label
2014	March 15	My Name Is Lucifer – Live in Kochi 2013	Acid Mothers Temple

== Acid Mothers Temple & The Cosmic Inferno ==
=== Studio albums ===
Year	Date	Title	Label
2005	May	Another Band from the Cosmic Inferno European Tour 2005 – Cosmic Funeral Route 666	Acid Mothers Temple
2005	June	Anthems of the Space	Ektro
2005	July 18	Demons from Nipples	Vivo
2005	July 19	Just Another Band from the Cosmic Inferno	Important
2005	September 20	IAO Chant from the Cosmic Inferno	Ace Fu
2006	February 21	Starless and Bible Black Sabbath	Alien8
2007	December	Ominous from the Cosmic Inferno	Essence
2008	September 8	Journey into the Cosmic Inferno	Very Friendly
2008	September 15	Pink Lady Lemonade ~ You're From Outer Space	Riot Season
2011	July 17	For How Much Longer Do We Tolerate Goofy Funk	Chaotic Noise
2012	June 15	Chaos Unforgiven Kisses or Grateful Dead Kennedys	Chaotic Noise
2013	September 2	Doobie Wonderland	Parallax Sounds

=== Live albums ===
Year	Date	Title	Label
2008	August 12	Hotter Than Inferno ~ Live in Sapporo 2008	Vivo
2011	November	Shakespeare from the Cosmic Inferno 2008	Blackest Bootlegs

=== Video albums ===
Year	Date	Title	Label
2007	January 15	2006 Summer Live!!	Enban
2007	July	Hardcore Uncle Meat: Live in Croatia 2005	Acid Mothers Temple
2008	September	Hotter Than Inferno – Live in Osaka 2007	Acid Mothers Temple

=== EPs ===
Year	Date	Title	Label	Note
2005	May	Melting Paraiso U.F.O. vs Cosmic Inferno	Acid Mothers Temple	split with AMT & The Melting Paraiso U.F.O. Limited edition CDr five copies
2007		The Load Is a Virgin Killer / Hot Doggin' on a Flip Flop	Nokahoma	split with Je Suis France

=== Singles ===
Year	Date	Title	Label	Note
2005		Trigger In Trigger Out – 2005 US Tour Single	Nokahoma	
2008	November	Sonic Attack (Psychedelic Warlords)	Trensmat	split with White Hills

== Acid Mothers Temple & The Pink Ladies Blues ==
=== Studio albums ===
Year	Date	Title	Label
2006	February	Featuring the Sun Love and the Heavy Metal Thunder	Fractal

=== EPs ===
Year	Date	Title	Label
2007		The Soul of a Mountain Wolf	Fractal

== Acid Mothers Temple SWR ==
=== Studio albums ===
Year	Date	Title	Label
2005	April 11	SWR	Very Friendly
2007	May 25	Stones, Women, & Records	Magaibutsu
2014	October 8	Yes, No & Perhaps	Magaibutsu

=== Live albums ===
Year	Date	Title	Label	Note
2011	January 12	Sax & the City	Magaibutsu	with Umezu Kazutoki
2011	January 14	Stones, Women and Records at Taku Taku 2009	Acid Mothers Temple	with Umezu Kazutoki and Seiichi Yamamoto

== Tsurubami ==
=== Studio albums ===
Year	Date	Title	Label
1995		Tsurubami (つるばみ)	Tenkyo no To (天侠の徒)
1998	May	Tenkyo no To (天侠の徒)	Acid Mothers Temple
2000		Kaina	Last Visible Dog
2003		Tsukuyomi Ni (月夜見に)	Riot Season
2003	September 2	Gekkyukekkaichi (月球結界地)	Strange Attractors Audio House
2005	March 5	Shohjohkisshohtan (清浄吉祥譚)	Clu Clux Clam
2007	December 5	Tenrin (天臨)	Vivo

=== Live albums ===
Year	Date	Title	Label	Note
2001	April	Hanshoh no Omoi (反照の想ひ)	Acid Mothers Temple	
2003		Acid Mothers Temple Soul Collective Tour 2003	Acid Mothers Temple	Live track by Tsurubami. Studio tracks by Pardons, Kawabata Makoto

== Yamamoto Seiichi & Acid Mothers Temple ==
=== Live albums ===
Year	Date	Title	Label
2008	December	Giant Psychedelia	Acid Mothers Temple
2011	January	Mega Psychedelia	Acid Mothers Temple
2012	December	Giga Psychedelia	Acid Mothers Temple

== Acid Mothers Reynols ==
=== Studio albums ===
Year	Date	Title	Label
2008	February 28	Vol.1	Vert Pituite La belle
2022	January 27	Vol.2	Hive Mind Records

== Acid Moon Temple ==
Acid Mothers Temple (Tsuyama Atsushi, Shimura Koji, Kawabata Makoto, Higashi Hiroshi) plus Honeymoons (Tenko, Atsuko Kamura)

=== Studio albums ===
Year	Date	Title	Label
2022	August 8	Gassha	Acid Mothers Temple

== Festivals & Tours ==
Albums associated with a particular festival, tour etc. featuring multiple combinations of a group of performers. Two or more tracks per album credited to different artists, but including at least one Acid Mothers Temple credit. Treated as live albums here, although some include studio recordings.

=== Live albums ===
Year	Date	Title	Label	Notes
2005		Japanese New Music Festival Ver.4 November 2005 ( 日本の新音楽)	Magaibutsu	Acid Mothers Temple SWR and others. Enhanced CD with video content
2008	April	Japanese New Music Festival 2008	Acid Mothers Temple	Acid Mothers Temple SWR and others. Enhanced CD with video content
2010	October	Guru Guru Fest 2010	Chaotic Noise	Acid Mothers Temple SWR, Acid Mothers Guru Guru, Manitatsu
2013		Guru Guru Fest 2012	Magaibutsu	Acid Mothers Temple SWR, Acid Mothers Guru Guru and others
2017		Japanese New Music Festival 2017	Magaibutsu	Acid Mothers Temple SWR and others
