= IAO Chant from the Cosmic Inferno =

IAO Chant From The Cosmic Inferno

Studio album by Acid Mothers Temple and The Cosmic Inferno
- Released: September 20, 2005
- Recorded: March–May 2005
- Genre: Experimental rock, psychedelic rock
- Length: 51:25
- Label: Ace Fu Records
- Producer: Kawabata Makoto

Acid Mothers Temple and The Cosmic Inferno chronology
Demons From Nipples (2005)	IAO Chant From The Cosmic Inferno (2005)	Starless and Bible Black Sabbath (2006)

Professional ratings
Review scores
Source	Rating
AllMusic	4/5 stars
Pitchfork	(7.9/10)

IAO Chant From The Cosmic Inferno is an album by the Japanese group The Acid Mothers Temple and the Cosmic Inferno released in 2005 by Ace Fu Records. The album contains one piece, nearly an hour long, based on the Gong song Master Builder. Acid Mothers Temple covered Master Builder again in 2012 on IAO Chant From The Melting Paraiso Underground Freak Out.

== Track listing ==
1. "OM Riff" – 51:25

== Personnel ==
- Tabata Mitsuru - bass, vocal, maratab
- Higashi Hiroshi - electronics
- Shimura Koji - drums
- Okano Futoshi - drums
- Kawabata Makoto - guitar, chant, hurdygurdy

=== Technical personnel ===
- Kawabata Makoto - production, engineering
- Yoshida Tatsuya - digital mastering
