= +1 Music =

- Company type: Entertainment
- Genre: Independent, alternative
- Founded: 2004
- Headquarters: New York, NY; San Francisco, CA
- Divisions: +1 Records
- Website: www.plusonemusic.net

+1 Music was founded in 2004 as a management and public relations company. The company now offers direct-to-fan online and social network marketing.

In 2008 the company launched +1 Records.

== Members ==
Ambulance LTD, Atlas Genius, Basement Jaxx, The Boy Least Likely To, The BPA, Caveman, The Cribs, Editors, Frankie & The Heartstrings, The Heavy, Illinois, Jamie T, Kate Nash, The Kooks, Lissie, the morning benders, The Postelles, stellastarr*, TV On The Radio, Two Gallants, White Lies

Diesel-U-Music, JELLY, Lebowski Fest, Playboy Rock the Rabbit, Future Sounds, The US Air Guitar Championships
