= SWR =

SWR may refer to:

== Radio and television ==
- Standing wave ratio, in radio-engineering a measure of impedance matching of loads

=== Broadcasters ===
- Scandinavian Weekend Radio, Virrat, Finland
- South West Radio, former broadcaster, England
- Südwestrundfunk, German radio and television broadcaster
  - SWR Symphonieorchester, a radio orchestra affiliated with Südwestrundfunk
  - SWR Vokalensemble, the vocal ensemble of Südwestrundfunk
  - SWR Fernsehen, a German regional television channel
- SWR FM, former name of the SWR 99.9 FM radio broadcaster, Sydney, Australia

== People ==
- Simeon Woods Richardson, American baseball player

== Transportation ==
=== Railway ===
- South Wales Railway, UK
- South Western Railway, a UK train operating company
- South Western Railway zone, India

=== Airlines ===
- Swiss International Air Lines (ICAO code), national airline of Switzerland
- Swissair (ICAO code), former national airline of Switzerland

== Other uses ==
- SWR, an album by Acid Mothers Temple
- SWR Sound Corporation, guitar amplifier manufacturer
- Saweru language (ISO 639:swr), closely related to Yawa of central Yapen Island, Indonesia
- Scarlet Weather Rhapsody, 2008 video game of the Touhou Project series
- Scotch Whisky Regulations 2009, a UK law
- She Wants Revenge, American rock band
- Shoreham-Wading River High School, an American high school on Long Island, New York
- Sublime with Rome

== See also ==
- Glasgow and South Western Railway (G&SWR), a former railway company in Scotland
