= Nam Myo Ho Ren Ge Kyo =

Studio album by Acid Mothers Temple & The Melting Paraiso U.F.O.
- Released: June 19, 2007
- Recorded: December 2006 – January 2007
- Genre: Psychedelic rock, acid rock
- Length: 1:05:15
- Label: Ace Fu
- Producer: Kawabata Makoto

Acid Mothers Temple & The Melting Paraiso U.F.O. chronology
Crystal Rainbow Pyramid Under the Stars (2007)	Nam Myo Ho Ren Ge Kyo (2007)	Acid Motherly Love (2007)

Professional ratings
Review scores
Source	Rating
Allmusic	4/5 stars

Nam Myo Ho Ren Ge Kyo is an album by Acid Mothers Temple & The Melting Paraiso U.F.O., released in 2007 by Ace Fu Records.

== Track listing ==
No.	Title	Writer(s)	Length
1.	"Nam Myo Ho Ren Ge Kyo"	Traditional	1:05:15

== Personnel ==
- Kitagawa Hao - voice, hot spice & alcohol
- Tsuyama Atsushi - monster bass, voice, acoustic guitar, one-legged flute, alto recorder, cosmic joker
- Higashi Hiroshi - synthesizer, voice, dancin' king
- Shimura Koji - drums, Latino cool
- Ono Ryoko - alto sax, flute, aesthetic perverted karman
- Kawabata Makoto - electric guitar, voice, hurdy-gurdy, acoustic guitar, glockenspiel, tambura, sarangi, speed guru

=== Technical personnel ===
- Kawabata Makoto - Production and Engineering
- Yoshida Tatsuya - Digital Mastering
- Kawabata Sachiko - Art Work
