= Electric Heavyland =

Studio album by Acid Mothers Temple & The Melting Paraiso U.F.O.
- Released: October 06, 2002
- Genre: Psychedelic rock, acid rock
- Label: Alien8 Recordings
- Producer: Kawabata Makoto

Acid Mothers Temple & The Melting Paraiso U.F.O. chronology
Univers Zen ou de zéro à zéro (2002)	Electric Heavyland (2002)	St. Captain Freak Out & the Magic Bamboo Request (2002)

Professional ratings
Review scores
Source	Rating
AllMusic	3.5/5 stars
Pitchfork Media	(8.3/10)

Electric Heavyland is an album by Acid Mothers Temple & The Melting Paraiso U.F.O., released in 2002 by Alien8 Recordings.

== Track listing ==
No.	Title	Lyrics	Music	Length
1.	"Atomic Rotary Grinding God" "Quicksilver Machine Head"	Cotton; Cotton	Kawabata, Tsuyama, Koizumi; Kawabata	15:43
2.	"Loved And Confused"	Cotton	Kawabata	17:02
3.	"Phantom Of Galactic Magnum"	Cotton	Kawabata, Tsuyama, Koizumi	18:57

== Credits ==
Credits, as stated on the Acid Mothers website:

1. Cotton Casino - vocals, synthesizer, beer & cigarette
2. Tsuyama Atsushi - monster bass, cosmic joker
3. Higashi Hiroshi - synthesizers, dancin' king
4. Koizumi Hajime - drums, sleeping monk
5. Kawabata Makoto - guitars, speed guru
