= Have You Seen the Other Side of the Sky? =

Studio album by Acid Mothers Temple & The Melting Paraiso U.F.O.
- Released: June 13, 2006
- Recorded: May 2005 – Feb 2006
- Genre: Psychedelic rock, acid rock
- Length: 62:43
- Label: Ace Fu
- Producer: Kawabata Makoto

Acid Mothers Temple & The Melting Paraiso U.F.O. chronology
Close Encounters of the Mutants (2004)	Have You Seen the Other Side of the Sky? (2006)	Myth of the Love Electrique (2006)

Professional ratings
Review scores
Source	Rating
AllMusic	4/5 stars
Pitchfork	(7/10)

Have You Seen the Other Side of the Sky? is an album by Acid Mothers Temple & The Melting Paraiso U.F.O., released in 2006 by Ace Fu.

== Track listing ==
No.	Title	Writer(s)	Length
1.	"Attack from Planet Hattifatteners"	Kawabata, Tsuyama, Uki	6:14
2.	"Buy the Moon of Jupiter"	Tsuyama	3:27
3.	"Asimo's Naked Breakfast : Rice and Shrine"	Tsuyama	15:01
4.	"I Wanna Be Your Bicycle Saddle"	Kawabata, Tsuyama, Uki	1:37
5.	"Interplanetary Love"	Tsuyama	5:54
6.	"The Tale of the Solar Sail-Dark Stars in the Dazzling Sky"	Kawabata, Tsuyama	30:30

== Personnel ==
Credits, as stated on the Acid Mothers website:

- Tsuyama Atsushi - monster bass, voice, acoustic guitar, one-legged flute, sopranino recorder, organ-guitar, cosmic joker
- Higashi Hiroshi - synthesizer, dancin' king
- Uki Eiji - drums, wrecker & convoy
- Ono Ryoko - alto sax, flute, aesthetic perverted karman
- Nao - erotic voice, astral easy virtue
- Kawabata Makoto - electric guitar, sarangi, electric sitar, hurdygurdy, tambura, glockenspiel, electronics, short wave, percussion, voice, speed guru

=== Technical personnel ===
- Kawabata Makoto - production and engineering, photography
- Yoshida Tatsuya - digital mastering
- Kawabata Sachiko - Art work
- Tsuyama Akiko - photography
- Takayama Manabu - live photography
- Grga Mirjanic - live photography
