= 41st Century Splendid Man =

Studio album by Acid Mothers Temple & The Melting Paraiso U.F.O.
- Released: 2002, 2007
- Recorded: 1997–1998
- Genre: Psychedelic rock, acid rock
- Label: tUMULt, Essence
- Producer: Kawabata Makoto

Acid Mothers Temple & The Melting Paraiso U.F.O. chronology
In C (2001)	41st Century Splendid Man (2002)	Univers Zen ou de zéro à zéro (2002)

Acid Mothers Temple & The Melting Paraiso U.F.O. chronology
Acid Motherly Love (2007)	41st Century Splendid Man Returns (2007)	Recurring Dream and Apocalypse of Darkness (2008)

41st Century Splendid Man is an album by Acid Mothers Temple & The Melting Paraiso U.F.O., released in 2002 by tUMULt Records and a limited edition picture disc. The album's name is a play on King Crimson's song "21st Century Schizoid Man." The album was re-released on CD in 2007 by Essence Music with new artwork and extra tracks. The re-release is titled 41st Century Splendid Man Returns.

== Track listing ==
=== 41st Century Splendid Man ===
Side A
No.	Title	Writer(s)	Length
1.	"41st Century Splendid Man"	Kawabata	14:13

Side B
No.	Title	Writer(s)	Length
1.	"The Creation of The Human Race"	Yoshida, Tsuyama. Kawabata	8:57
2.	"Dalai Gama"	Yoshida, Tsuyama. Kawabata	4:26

=== 41st Century Splendid Man Returns ===
No.	Title	Writer(s)	Length
1.	"Ruck Zuck"	Schneider, Heuter	7:08
2.	"41st Century Splendid Man"	Kawabata	14:49
3.	"Genesis of Humanity" (Amoebae – Volcanoes – Dinosaurs – Humanity – Civilization – War – Extinction – Robots)	Tsuyama, Kawabata, Yoshida	9:15
4.	"Dalai Gama"	Tsuyama, Kawabata, Yoshida	4:40
5.	"Hello Eskimo or Polyhedral Mu"	Tsuyama, Koizumi, Kawabata	14:21
Total length:			50:11

== Personnel ==
- Cotton Casino – vocal
- Tsuyama Atsushi – Tibetan trumpet, bass, synthesizer, bass harmonica
- Higashi Hiroshi – synthesizer
- Koizumi Hajime – percussion
- Kawabata Makoto – guitar, synthesizer, violin, sarangi, electric sitar, bowed sitar, zurna, RDS900

Additional personnel

- Yoko – space phone girl
- Ayano – cosmic companion
- Yoshida Tatsuya – drums

=== Technical personnel ===
Artwork – Jason Killinger, Kawabata Sachiko, Uirajara Resende Producer, Engineer – Kawabata Makoto
