= Wet Zoo =

Studio album by Annuals
- Released: April 1, 2008
- Genre: Indie pop
- Length: 17:39
- Label: Canvasback
- Producer: Adam Baker

Annuals chronology
Be He Me (2006)	Wet Zoo (2008)	Such Fun (2008)

Professional ratings
Review scores
Source	Rating
Blog Critics	(Favorable)
QRO Magazine	(8.0/10)
PopMatters	(6/10)
IndyWeek	(Mixed)

Wet Zoo is an EP released by Annuals. Released on April 1, 2008 under Sony imprint label Canvasback Music. The EP was split with Annuals sister band, Sunfold. It served as a stop-gap between Be He Me and Such Fun

== Track listing ==
No.	Title	Length
1.	"Sore"	4:12
2.	"Around Your Neck"	2:48
3.	"Just Stay In"	3:01
4.	"Between The Worlds"	2:43
5.	"Watering Pail"	4:58
