= Pink Lady Lemonade ~ You're from Inner Space =

Studio album by Acid Mothers Temple & the Melting Paraiso U.F.O.
- Released: April 5, 2011
- Genre: Psychedelic rock, acid rock
- Length: 66:11
- Label: Alien8 Recordings

Acid Mothers Temple & the Melting Paraiso U.F.O. chronology
In 0 to ∞ (2009)	Pink Lady Lemonade ~ You're from Inner Space (2011)	The Ripper At The Heaven's Gates Of Dark (2011)

Pink Lady Lemonade ~ You're from Inner Space is an album by Acid Mothers Temple & the Melting Paraiso U.F.O. released by Alien8 Recordings on April 5, 2011. The album is available on CD or as a limited edition double-LP on color vinyl (either yellow or pink/black, 500 copies per color), with artwork by Felix Morel.

== Track listing ==
No.	Title	Length
1.	"Part 1"	31:59
2.	"Part 2"	5:00
3.	"Part 3"	10:33
4.	"Part 4"	18:39
