= In 0 to ∞ =

Studio album by Acid Mothers Temple & The Melting Paraiso U.F.O.
- Released: April 27, 2010
- Genre: Psychedelic rock, acid rock
- Length: 73:44
- Label: Important Records
- Producer: Kawabata Makoto

Acid Mothers Temple & The Melting Paraiso U.F.O. chronology
Dark Side of the Black Moon: What Planet Are We On? (2009)	In 0 to ∞ (2010)	Pink Lady Lemonade ~ You're From Inner Space (2010)

In 0 to ∞
- Vinyl edition cover

In 0 to ∞ is an album by Acid Mothers Temple & The Melting Paraiso U.F.O., released in 2010 by Important Records. The album is a follow-up to their 2001 cover of Terry Riley's In C.

== Release ==
The album was released on CD and LP. The LP release was limited to 100 copies on yellow vinyl and 100 copies on clear vinyl. The remaining 800 copies will be on standard vinyl.

== Track listing ==
No.	Title	Writer(s)	Length
1.	"In 0"	Kawabata	18:15
2.	"In A"	Kawabata, Tsuyama, Cotton	18:21
3.	"In Z"	Kawabata	18:39
4.	"In ∞"	Kawabata	18:29
Total length:			73:44

== Personnel ==
- Tsuyama Atsushi - monster bass, voice, soprano sax, recorder, chimpo pipe, temple block, cosmic joker
- Higashi Hiroshi - synthesizer, dancin'king
- Shimura Koji - drums, Latino cool
- Ichiraku Yoshimitsu - drums, doravideo
- Kawabata Makoto - guitar, organ, synthesizer, analog guitar synthesizer, gong, glockenspiel, tape-loop, voice, speed guru

=== Guests ===
- Cotton Casino - voice

=== Technical personnel ===
- produced & engineered by Kawabata Makoto
