= In Search of the Lost Divine Arc =

Studio album by Acid Mothers Temple & the Melting Paraiso U.F.O.
- Released: 2013
- Recorded: June–December 2012
- Genre: Psychedelic rock, acid rock
- Length: 56:40
- Label: Important Records
- Producer: Kawabata Makoto

Acid Mothers Temple & the Melting Paraiso U.F.O. chronology
Cometary Orbital Drive to 2199 (2013)	In Search of the Lost Divine Arc (2013)

In Search of the Lost Divine Arc is an album by Acid Mothers Temple & the Melting Paraiso U.F.O. released by Important Records in 2013. The album is available on CD and as a deluxe blue vinyl double-LP, limited to 200 copies.

== Track listing ==
No.	Title	Writer(s)	Length
1.	"Space Speed Suicide"	Kawabata	5:01
2.	"Born Free Stone Free"	Tsuyama, Kawabata	16:49
3.	"Skilfiul Grinning Skull"	Tsuyama, Kawabata	4:57
4.	"Escape Horoscopes"	Kawabata	2:57
5.	"Babe, I’m Gonna Reave You"	Tsuyama, Kawabata	7:24
6.	"In Search of Lost Divine Ark"	Tsuyama, Kawabata	19:32
Total length:			56:40

== Personnel ==
- Tsuyama Atsushi: bass, voice, flute, pipe
- Higashi Hiroshi: synthesizer
- Shimura Koji: drums
- Tabata Mitsuru: guitar, guitar-synthesizer, maratab
- Kawabata Makoto: guitar, bouzouki, electric sitar, hurdy-gurdy

=== Technical personnel ===
- Kawabata Makoto: production, engineering and mixing
- Yoshida Tatsuya: digital mastering
