= The Ripper at the Heaven's Gates of Dark =

Studio album by Acid Mothers Temple & the Melting Paraiso U.F.O.
- Released: October 31, 2011
- Genre: Psychedelic rock, acid rock
- Label: Riot Season

Acid Mothers Temple & the Melting Paraiso U.F.O. chronology
Pink Lady Lemonade ~ You're From Inner Space (2011)	The Ripper at the Heaven's Gates of Dark (2011)	Son of a Bitches Brew (2012)

Professional ratings
Review scores
Source	Rating
Beard Rock	3/5 stars

The Ripper at the Heaven's Gates of Dark is an album by Acid Mothers Temple & the Melting Paraiso U.F.O. released by Riot Season in October 2011. The album is available on CD or as a limited edition double-LP (500 copies), with artwork by Shigeno Sachiko.

== Track listing ==
No.	Title	Length
1.	"Chinese Flying Saucer"	12:03
2.	"Chakra 24"	4:07
3.	"Back Door Man Of Ghost Rails Inn"	15:17
4.	"Shine on You Crazy Dynamite"	21:57
5.	"Electric Death Mantra"	19:22

== Personnel ==
- Tsuyama Atsushi – monster bass, voice, soprano sax, campo flute, soprano recorder, acoustic guitar, cosmic joker
- Higashi Hiroshi – synthesizer, dancin'king
- Shimura Koji – drums, Latino cool
- Kawabata Makoto – electric guitar, electric bouzouki, sitar, organ, percussion, electronics, speed guru

=== Technical personnel ===
- Kawabata Makoto – Production and engineering, photography
- Yoshida Tatsuya – Digital mastering
- Justin "God" Waters – Members photo
- Shigeno Sachiko – Art work
