= Lord of the Underground: Vishnu and the Magic Elixir =

Studio album by Acid Mothers Temple & The Melting Paraiso U.F.O.
- Released: May 5, 2009
- Recorded: August – October 2008
- Genre: Psychedelic rock, acid rock
- Label: Alien8 Recordings
- Producer: Kawabata Makoto

Acid Mothers Temple & The Melting Paraiso U.F.O. chronology
Interstellar Guru and Zero (2009)	Lord of the Underground: Vishnu and the Magic Elixir (2009)	Are We Experimental? (2009)

Professional ratings
Review scores
Source	Rating
AllMusic	3.5/5 stars
Brainwashed	(?)
Hour	4/5 stars

Lord of the Underground: Vishnu and the Magic Elixir is an album by Acid Mothers Temple & The Melting Paraiso U.F.O., released in 2009 by Alien8 Recordings.

== Track listing ==
No.	Title	Writer(s)	Length
1.	"Elking the Clay"	Kawabata, Tsuyama	13:59
2.	"Sorcerer's Stone of the Magi"	Tsuyama	3:51
3.	"Vishnu and the Magic Elixir"	Kawabata, Shimura, Tsuyama	25:33

== Personnel ==
Credits, as stated on the liner notes:

- Tsuyama Atsushi - monster bass, voice, acoustic guitar, alto recorder, flute, toy trumpet, kazoo, cosmic joker
- Higashi Hiroshi - synthesizer, dancin'king
- Shimura Koji - drums, Latino cool
- Kawabata Makoto - electric guitar, Electric Guitar, Bouzouki, Saz, Sitar, Organ, Percussion, Speed Guru

=== Technical personnel ===
- Production - Kawabata Makoto
- Mastering - Yoshida Tatsuya
- Guylaine Bédard - Cover Design
- Dale Tomlinson - Photography
