= Does the Cosmic Shepherd Dream of Electric Tapirs? =

Studio album by Acid Mothers Temple & The Melting Paraiso U.F.O.
- Released: October 5, 2004
- Recorded: May 2002 – Jan 2003
- Genres: Psychedelic rock, acid rock

Acid Mothers Temple & The Melting Paraiso U.F.O. chronology
The Penultimate Galactic Bordello Also the World You Made (2004)	Does the Cosmic Shepherd Dream of Electric Tapirs? (2004)	Minstrel in the Galaxy (2004)

Professional ratings
Review scores
Source	Rating
Allmusic	4.5/5 stars

Does the Cosmic Shepherd Dream of Electric Tapirs? is an album by the Acid Mothers Temple & The Melting Paraiso U.F.O., released in 2004. The title is a reference to the Philip K. Dick novel, Do Androids Dream of Electric Sheep?.

The album was recorded at Acid Mothers Temple from May 2002 up to January 2003.

== Track listing ==
1. "Daddy's Bare Meat" - 8:20
2. "Suzie Sixteen" - 4:36
3. "Hello Good Child" - 8:01
4. "The Assassin's Beautiful Daughter" - 9:02
5. "Dark Star Blues" - 25:13
6. "The Transmigration of Hop Heads" - 18:25
