= Cometary Orbital Drive to 2199 =

Studio album by Acid Mothers Temple & the Melting Paraiso U.F.O.
- Released: LP: March 15, 2013; CD: April 9, 2013
- Genre: Psychedelic rock, acid rock
- Label: Nod and Smile
- Producer: Kawabata Makoto

Acid Mothers Temple & the Melting Paraiso U.F.O. chronology
IAO Chant From The Melting Paraiso Underground Freak Out (2012)	Cometary Orbital Drive to 2199 (2013)	In Search of Lost Divine Ark (2013)

Cometary Orbital Drive to 2199 is an album by Acid Mothers Temple & the Melting Paraiso U.F.O. released by Nod and Smile in 2013 which includes three new versions of "Cometary Orbital Drive," a song they often perform live.

The album was released on CD and vinyl double LP, with both formats limited to 500 copies each.

== Track listing ==
No.	Title	Length
1.	"Cometary Orbital Drive To 2199" (Split into 2 parts on LP release)	39:51
2.	"Cometary Orbital Drive To 2200"	14:28
3.	"Cometary Orbital Drive To 2201"	17:09

== Personnel ==
- Tsuyama Atsushi – bass
- Shimura Koji – drums
- Higashi Hiroshi – synthesizer
- Tabata Mitsuru – guitar, guitar synthesizer
- Kawabata Makoto – guitar, makototronics

=== Additional Personnel ===
- Yamamoto Seiichi – guitar on Cometary Orbital Drive To 2200

=== Technical personnel ===
- Kawabata Makoto – production, engineering and mixing
- Yoshida Tatsuya – engineering on Cometary Orbital Drive To 2200
- Yoshida Tatsuya – digital mastering
- Niko Potočnjak – artwork
