= Mantra of Love =

Studio album by Acid Mothers Temple & The Melting Paraiso U.F.O.
- Released: April 26, 2004
- Genre: Psychedelic rock, acid rock
- Length: 45:02
- Label: Alien8 Recordings
- Producer: Kawabata Makoto

Acid Mothers Temple & The Melting Paraiso U.F.O. chronology
Hypnotic Liquid Machine from the Golden Utopia (2004)	Mantra of Love (2004)	The Penultimate Galactic Bordello Also the World You Made (2004)

Professional ratings
Review scores
Source	Rating
AllMusic	4.5/5 stars
Pitchfork Media	(6.8/10)

Mantra of Love is an album by Acid Mothers Temple & The Melting Paraiso U.F.O., released in 2004 by Alien8 Recordings.

== Track listing ==
No.	Title	Lyrics	Music	Length
1.	"La Le Lo"		Occitan traditional	30:00
2.	"L' Ambition dans le Miroir"	Cotton, Tsuyama	Kawabata	15:02

== Credits ==
Credits, as stated on the Acid Mothers website:

1. Cotton Casino – vocal, beer cigarettes
2. Tsuyama Atsushi – monstar bass, vocal, cosmic joker
3. Higashi Hiroshi – synthesizer, dancin'king
4. Koizumi Hajime – drums, percussion, sleeping monk
5. Kawabata Makoto – guitar, bouzouki, electric sitar, violin, hammond organ, speed guru
