= Son of a Bitches Brew =

Studio album by Acid Mothers Temple & the Melting Paraiso U.F.O.
- Released: 2012
- Recorded: December 2011 – February 2012
- Genre: Psychedelic rock, acid rock, Jazz
- Label: Important Records

Acid Mothers Temple & the Melting Paraiso U.F.O. chronology
The Ripper at the Heaven's Gates of Dark (2011)	Son of a Bitches Brew (2012)	IAO Chant From The Melting Paraiso Underground Freak Out (2012)

Son of a Bitches Brew is an album by Acid Mothers Temple & the Melting Paraiso U.F.O., released in 2012. The album is available on CD or as a limited edition double-LP (500 copies) on blue and salmon vinyl. This album also marks the return of former vocalist, Cotton Casino.

== Recording ==
Son of a Bitches Brew was recorded and mixed without the use of computers or hard drive based recorders.

The title, music, and artwork are an adaption of the 1970 Miles Davis electric period album Bitches Brew.

== Track listing ==
No.	Title	Length
1.	"Son Of A Bitches Brew"	17:16
2.	"Helen Buddha; Miss Condom X"	7:01
3.	"Fellatioh's Dance also Bitch's Blow"	12:21
4.	"Water Babies Kill Kill Kill"	19:10
5.	"Theme From Violence Jack Johnson"	5:31
6.	"Tabata Mitsuru"	3:31
7.	"Sweet Peanut Vs Macedonian Beauty"	8:38

== Personnel ==
- Tsuyama Atsushi - Bass, Soprano saxophone, nei, pungi, alto recorder, voice
- Shimura Koki - drums
- Kawabata Makoto - guitar, electric piano, electronics, fuzz-otamatone, tape machine, yanquin, tanbura
- Higashi Hiroshi - synthesizer
- Tabata Mitsuro - guitar, guitar synthesizer on Tabata Mitsuru
- Cotton Casino - space whisper

=== Additional musicians ===
- Tabla Man - tabla on Tabata Mitsuru
- Stoo Odom - voice on Son Of A Bitches Brew
