= New Geocentric World of Acid Mothers Temple =

Studio album by Acid Mothers Temple & The Melting Paraiso U.F.O.
- Released: June 13, 2001
- Genres: Psychedelic rock, acid rock
- Label: Squealer
- Producer: Kawabata Makoto

Acid Mothers Temple & The Melting Paraiso U.F.O. chronology
Absolutely Freak Out (Zap Your Mind!!) (2001)	New Geocentric World of Acid Mothers Temple (2001)	In C (2001)

Professional ratings
Review scores
Source	Rating
AllMusic	3.5/5 stars
Pitchfork Media	(8.9/10)

New Geocentric World of Acid Mothers Temple is an album by Acid Mothers Temple & The Melting Paraiso U.F.O., released in 2001 by Squealer Music.

== Track listing ==
No.	Title	Writer(s)	Length
1.	"Psycho Buddha"	Atsushi, Ichiraku	21:19
2.	"Space Age Ballad"	Acid Mothers Temple	3:54
3.	"You're Still Now Near Me Everytime"	Haco, Kawabata	10:40
4.	"Universe of Romance"	Atsushi, Kawabata	5:21
5.	"Occie Lady"	Atsushi, Audrey, Kawabata, Yoshimitsu	8:28
6.	"Mellow Hollow Love"	Atsushi, Hiroshi	4:34
7.	"What Do I Want to Know (Like Heavenly Kisses), Pt. 2"	Audrey, Kawabata	14:58

== Personnel ==
Personnel as listed on Acid Mothers website.

- Cotton Casino - vocal, synthesizer, beer & cigarettes
- Tsuyama Atsushi - monster bass, acoustic guitar, vocal, cosmic joker
- Koizumi Hajime - drums, percussion, soprano saxophone, sleeping monk
- Higashi Hiroshi - synthesizer, acoustic guitar, soprano recorder, chorus, dancin' king
- Ichiraku Yoshimitsu - drums, kendo
- Audrey Ginestet - bass, piano, voice, cosmos
- Kawabata Makoto - electric guitars, violin, bowed peacock harp, organ, bouzouki, zurna, alto saxophone, cornemuse, synthesizer, vocal, speed guru

Additional personnel

- Mano Kazuhiko - tenor saxophone
- Ishida Yoko - peacock harp, chorus, cheese cake
- Haco - vocals
- Father Moo - guru and zero
- Magic Aum Gigi - Jew's harp, erotic underground

=== Technical personnel ===
- Kawabata Makoto - engineering and production
- Ishida Yoko - photography
