= Illinois (band) =

American indie rock band

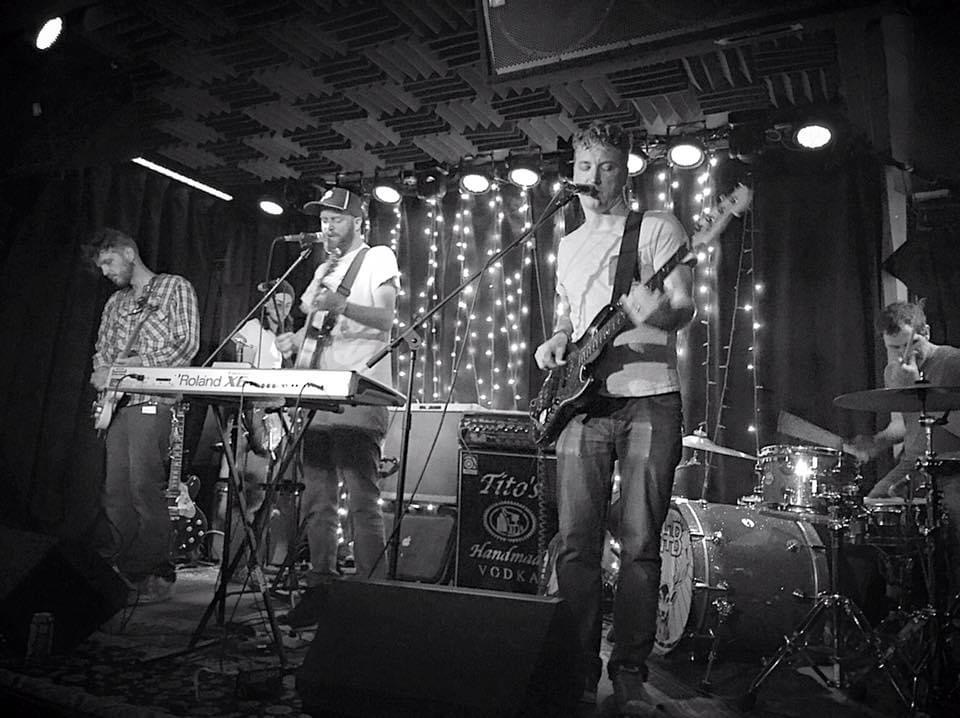
- Illinois live at Bourbon & Branch (June 2016)

Background information
- Origin: Bucks County, Pennsylvania, United States
- Genres: indie rock, indie folk, suburban soul, alternative rock, folk rock, adult alt.
- Years active: 2006–present
- Labels: Rockhampton Records, +1 Records, Ace Fu Records
- Members: Chris Archibald; Martin Hoeger; John-Paul Kuyper; Jason Buzolits; Andrew Lee
- Past members: Daniel Pawlovich; Matt Thieroff
- Website: www.illinoistheband.com

Illinois is an American indie rock band from Bucks County, Pennsylvania, fronted by Chris Archibald (vocals, guitar, banjo, keyboard). The other members of the band are Martin Hoeger (bass guitar, vocals), John Paul Kuyper (drums), Jason Buzolits (keyboard, synthesizer, guitar), and Andrew Lee (guitar). The band is occasionally accompanied on stage by Dee Jay Skipmode (turntables). The band has released four albums and two EPs.

== History ==
Illinois self-released their first EP, Revenge of Some Kid in 2006. and, in early 2007, Ace Fu Records signed the group after hearing it. Illinois released What the Hell Do I Know? on Ace Fu later that year, attracting comparisons with The White Stripes, The Arcade Fire, Coconut Records, The Morning Benders and Wilco. The group toured and played at SXSW following the release of the EP. Following this, the group toured with The Kooks. After signing with +1 Records in 2009, Illinois released The Adventures of Kid Catastrophe and subsequently embarked on nationwide tours with Menomena and The Builders and the Butchers.

In July 2011, a new album titled Lemonade Stand was released and was made available to stream on SoundCloud and the band's official website. Some time in 2011, the band left +1 Records and created Rockhampton Records with the band Eastern Conference Champions.

Illinois released their third album, Shine, in February 2015. This was followed by the release of their fourth album, Shady Lane, in September 2021.

The group's song "Nosebleed" was used in the season three episode of Weeds, called, "The Brick Dance." "Hang On" was used on the soundtrack for the video game, NBA 2K10. "Mama-a-Mine" was used in the closing credits for the Comedy Central web series, Delco Proper, which began in July 2015. "Mama-a-Mine" was also featured in the season two episode of Kingdom (American TV series), titled "Living Down."

== Members ==
Current

- Chris Archibald - vocals, guitar, keyboards, banjo
- Martin Hoeger - bass guitar, vocals
- John-Paul Kuyper - drums
- Jason Buzolits - guitar, keyboards, vocals
- Andrew Lee - guitar, keyboards, vocals, dancing, magic

Previous

- Daniel Pawlovich - guitar, keyboards, vocals
- Matt Thieroff - guitar, percussion

== Discography ==
- Revenge of Some Kid EP (2006)
- What the Hell Do I Know? EP (Ace Fu Records, 2007)
- We Were Wrong Single (Ace Fu Records, 2008)
- The Adventures of Kid Catastrophe deluxe edition LP (+1 Records, May 5, 2009)
- Lemonade Stand LP (self-released, July 21, 2011)
- Shine LP (self-released, February 24, 2015)
- Shady Lane LP (self-released, September 10, 2021)
