= Suishou no Fune =

Japanese rock band

- Origin: Japan
- Genres: psychedelic rock; space rock; progressive rock; shoegaze; noise rock
- Years active: 1999–present
- Labels: P.S.F.; Holy Mountain; Essence; Important; Sloow; Japanoise; The Lotus Sound; Blossoming Noise; there
- Members: Pirako Kurenai; Kageo; Hideo Matsueda; Jun Harada
- Past members: Shizuo Uchida; Tail; Yokai Takahashi; Toshihiko Isogai; Naoki Ushifusa; Mew; Kiyasu; Doronco Gumo; Takara Matsue
- Website: Official website

Suishou no Fune, roughly translated as "The Ship of Crystal" (水晶の舟, Suishō no fune), is a Japanese rock band formed in Tokyo by guitarists Pirako Kurenai and Kageo in July 1999. In 2002, Toshihiko Isogai joined on drums and the band added Doronco on bass a few months later. Also joined was Tail. Since then membership has revolved.

The band's music is characterized by free improvisation through twin-guitar explorations with vocals. They have done many live shows with Keiji Haino, having been the first one a 3 hour session jam in 2004. The group have toured the US and Europe many times and released various CDs, some on the Holy Mountain label. Their new CD is being produced by Michael Gibbons of Bardo Pond.

September 25, 2011 "You Tears" was released by "P.S.F RECORDS".

== Discography ==
- Live (ライブ) (Self-Released, 2003)
- Suishou no Fune (水晶の舟) (Japanoise, 2005)
- Where the Spirits Are (神がいる処) (Holy Mountain, 2006)
- Akatsuki: The Sky Grayed and the Dawn Came Behind the Fog (Self-Released, 2006)
- I Throw a Stone Into the Endless Depths (Sloow, 2007)
- The Light of Dark Night (aRCHIVE, 2007)
- Writhing Underground Flowers (The Lotus Sound, 2007)
- The Shining Star (Important, 2007)
- Prayer for Chibi (Holy Mountain, 2008)
- Mystic Atmosphere (Cut Hands, 2008)
- The Gold Labyrinth (黄金の迷宮) (Blossoming Noise, 2008)
- Phantom of the Eternal Night (常夜の幻) (There, 2009)
- Secret Entrance (Scumbag Relations, 2010)
- Your Tears (P.S.F., 2011)
- Bonsai no Ie (8mm, 2011)
- Black Flowers of the Forest in the Cosmos (Essence, 2013) (with Numinous Eye)
- Wishing on a Star (星に願いを) (P.S.F., 2015)
- Moonlight (Sour, 2018)
- The Lost Trees of Paradise (Important, 2019)
- The Wind is Spring - There is a Rainbow in the Sky - Love is Hiding in the Waves (An'archives, 2023)
