= The Penultimate Galactic Bordello Also the World You Made =

Studio album by Acid Mothers Temple & The Melting Paraiso U.F.O.
- Released: Sep 20, 2004
- Recorded: 2003–2004
- Genre: Psychedelic rock, acid rock
- Length: 4:08:34
- Label: Dirtier Promotions
- Producer: Kawabata Makoto

Acid Mothers Temple & The Melting Paraiso U.F.O. chronology
Mantra of Love (2004)	The Penultimate Galactic Bordello Also the World You Made (2004)	Does the Cosmic Shepherd Dream of Electric Tapirs? (2004)

The Penultimate Galactic Bordello Also the World You Made is an album by Acid Mothers Temple & The Melting Paraiso U.F.O., released in 2004 by Dirtier Promotions. The album spans four CDs in individual sleeves, all contained in one CD Box. Each disc contains only one song, with each song lasting approximately one hour.

== Track listing ==
Disc 1
No.	Title	Lyrics	Music	Length
1.	"The Beautiful Blue Ecstasy (Have You Seen the Blue Sky?)"	Kawabata	Kawabata	60:08

Disc 2
No.	Title	Music	Length
1.	"The Seven Stigmata from Pussycat Nebula"	Kawabata, Tsuyama, Koizumi	56:04

Disc 3
No.	Title	Lyrics	Music	Length
1.	"What's Your Name?"	Kawabata	Kawabata, Tsuyama	70:46

Disc 4
No.	Title	Music	Length
1.	"The Holly Mountain in the Counter-Clock World"	Kawabata	61:36

== Personnel ==
=== Disc 1 ===
- Cotton Casino - space voice, beer & cigarette
- Tsuyama Atsushi - monster bass, cosmic joker
- Higashi Hiroshi - synthesizer, dancin'king
- Koizumi Hajime - drums, sleeping monk
- Kawabata Makoto - guitar, guitar-synthesizer, hammond organ, voice, RDS-900, speed guru

=== Disc 2 ===
- Cotton Casino - voice, beer & cigarette
- Tsuyama Atsushi - monster bass, cosmic joker
- Higashi Hiroshi - synthesizer, dancin'king
- Koizumi Hajime - drums, sleeping monk
- Kawabata Makoto - guitar, ney, speed guru

=== Disc 3 ===
- Cotton Casino - voice, beer & cigarette
- Tsuyama Atsushi - voice, monster bass, piano, drums, toy gameran, cosmic joker
- Higashi Hiroshi - synthesizer, dancin'king
- Koizumi Hajime - drums, sleeping monk
- Kawabata Makoto - guitar, piano, synthesizer, alien voice, speed guru

=== Disc 4 ===
- Tsuyama Atsushi - super voice, cosmic joker
- Higashi Hiroshi - synthesizer, dancin'king
- Koizumi Hajime - percussion, sleeping monk
- Kawabata Makoto - sarangi, guitar, piano, speed guru
