= Psychedelic Navigator =

Studio album by Acid Mothers Guru Guru
- Released: Sep 18, 2007
- Recorded: 2007
- Genre: Psychedelic rock, acid rock
- Label: Important Records

Psychedelic Navigator is an album by Acid Mothers Guru Guru, released in 2007 by Important Records. The band consists of members of the Japanese psychedelic band Acid Mothers Temple, Kawabata Makoto and Atsushi Tsuyama and German Krautrock drummer Mani Neumeier of Guru Guru.

== Track listing ==
No.	Title	Writer(s)	Length
1.	"Stonerrock Socks"	Neumeier	10:49
2.	"Bayangobi"	Neumeier	20:24
3.	"For Bunka-San"	Neumeier	2:18
4.	"Psychedelic Navigator"	Neumeier	19:49
5.	"Bo Diddley"	Genrich, Neumeier, Trepte	8:40
Total length:			62:00

== Personnel ==
- Makoto Kawabata - Guitar, Vocals
- Mani Neumeier - Drums, Vocals, Editing
- Atsushi Tsuyama - Bass, Flute, Bass Guitar, Vocals
