= Myth of the Love Electrique =

Studio album by Acid Mothers Temple & The Melting Paraiso U.F.O.
- Released: November 27, 2006
- Recorded: July 10 – August 13, 2006
- Genre: Psychedelic rock, acid rock
- Label: Riot Season
- Producer: Kawabata Makoto

Acid Mothers Temple & The Melting Paraiso U.F.O. chronology
Have You Seen the Other Side of the Sky? (2006)	Myth of the Love Electrique (2006)	Crystal Rainbow Pyramid Under the Stars (2007)

Myth of the Love Electrique is an album by the Acid Mothers Temple & The Melting Paraiso U.F.O., released in 2006 by Riot Season. This is the first album to feature Kitagawa Hao on vocals.

== Track listing ==
No.	Title	Lyrics	Music	Length
1.	"The Man From Giacobinid Meteor Comet: a) Giacobinid Meteor Shower Attack; b) Viva Astro Django; c) Sailing On Giacobini's Orbital"		Kawabata, Tsuyama; Tsuyama; Kawabata	21:25
2.	"Five Dimensional Nightmare: a) The Golden Apple And 400 Wives; b) Magic Fingers Of The Undesired Fiend; c) Or A Spell For Sargasso Of Space"	Kitagawa; Tsuyama; Tsuyama	Kawabata; Kawabata, Tsuyama; Tsuyama	13:41
3.	"Love Electrique"	Kitagawa	Kawabata, Tsuyama, Shimura	19:38
4.	"Pink Lady Lemonade (May I Drink You Once Again?)"	Kitagawa	Kawabata	20:39

== Personnel ==
- Kitagawa Hao - voice
- Tsuyama Atsushi - monster bass, acoustic guitar, voice, one-legged flute, soprano recorder
- Higashi Hiroshi - synthesizer
- Shimura Koji - drums
- Kawabata Makoto - electric guitar, bouzouki, electric bouzouki, hurdy-gurdy, organ, synthesizer, electronics, tambura, sitar, percussion

=== Technical personnel ===
- Kawabata Makoto - Production and Engineering
- Yoshida Tatsuya - Digital Mastering
- Kawabata Sachiko - Artwork
