= St. Captain Freak Out & the Magic Bamboo Request =

St. Captain Freak Out and the Magic Bamboo Request

Studio album by Acid Mothers Temple & The Melting Paraiso U.F.O.
- Released: 2002
- Recorded: Acid Mothers Temple, Mar–Aug 2002
- Genre: Psychedelic rock, acid rock
- Length: 70:55
- Label: Ektro Records
- Producer: Kawabata Makoto

Acid Mothers Temple & The Melting Paraiso U.F.O. chronology
Univers Zen ou de zéro à zéro (2002)	St. Captain Freak Out and the Magic Bamboo Request (2002)	Magical Power from Mars (2003)

St. Captain Freak Out And The Magic Bamboo Request is an album by Acid Mothers Temple, released in 2002 by Ektro Records.

== Concept album ==
It's the story of a sad character called St. Captain Freak Out, who dies of a drug overdose but gets led on by the Cosmic Star Child and goes in search of a drug called Magic Bamboo that is treasured even in the afterworld. On his search for clues to the whereabouts of this drug, he goes and visits Twiggy Cheesecake, but Cosmic Star Child puts a spell on him and a demon called Hallelujah Hallucinogenic Hellfire turns him into a slave to rock 'n' roll.

— Guitarist Kawabata Makoto, Acid Mothers Temple

== Reception ==
James Mason from AllMusic rated it, writing that "the band is in full flight, with full-on performances from Koizumi Hajime on drums and third-eye guitarist Kawabata Makoto on all types of stringed instruments". Mason criticized the band's approach to the album, stating it is "hindered by a substandard and somewhat muddy mix". He goes on to opine that it is a "shame that a band this extraordinary sounds so under-produced and unfocused on this album", but also notes that fans of the band "know just what to expect here, but for others, there are easier roads inside".

Jeff Economy wrote in his review for the Chicago Tribune that "their sound is a dense, cacophonous freak-out of hyperactive psychedelic guitar and intensely furious percussive rhythms, cut through with wailing, disembodied vocals and ethereal electronic drones". He also points out that but for all the "pseudo-mystical trappings, their music has a no-nonsense physicality informed by the industrial muscle of bands like MC5.

== Track listing ==
No.	Title	Writer(s)	Length
1.	"I Am St. Captain Freak Out"	Kawabata Makoto	1:18
2.	"Planet Pussy Virgo / The Tombstone Phantom Driver / Welcome to the New Life in the Raw"	Cotton Casino / Cotton, Kawabata, Tsuyama Atsushi, Okano Futoshi / Kawabata	6:47
3.	"Cosmic Magic of Love Part 1"	Tsuyama	1:45
4.	"Dead Man is Smoking"	Cotton, Kawabata, Tsuyama, Okano	8:46
5.	"Porks' Bomb in Aztec Part 0"	Kawabata	3:06
6.	"Hi Twiggy Cheesecake"	Kawabata	0:27
7.	"A Bamboo Is as Close as Miss Trout to Marshmallows (Grok Version / Schlock Version)"	Tsuyama, Kawabata / Cotton, Kawabata	7:38
8.	"Sir Satanic Magic Bamboo Jerks Off / Angelic Bamboo Bambino Forever"	Kawabata / Cotton	10:34
9.	"Maggot Head Cheese"	Cotton, Kawabata, Tsuyama, Okano	13:34
10.	"Man on the Holy Mountain"	Tsuyama	3:55
11.	"Sweet Lucille or Lick My Milk Off, Baby"	Tsuyama, Kawabata, Koizumi	11:03
12.	"Cosmic Magic of Love Part 2"	Tsuyama	2:02

== Credits ==
The credits are stated as such:

- Kawabata Makoto - Electric guitars, synthesizer, percussion, speed guru
- Cotton Super Casino - Synthesizer, sitar, beer & cigarettes
- Tsuyama Atsushi - Monster bass, acoustic guitar, spaghetti western guitar, cosmic joker
- Higashi Hiroshi - Synthesizer, dancin' king
- Okano - Drums, god speed
- Koizumi Hajime - Drums, sleeping monk
- Uki Eiji - Drums

== See also ==
- Concept album
- List of concept albums
- Visual album
