= Absolutely Freak Out (Zap Your Mind!!) =

2001 rock studio album

Studio album by Acid Mothers Temple & The Melting Paraiso U.F.O.
- Released: February 2001
- Recorded: May – July 2000
- Studio: Acid Mothers Temple, JPN and FTF Studio, Frankfurt, DEU
- Genre: Psychedelic rock, acid rock
- Length: 123:43
- Producer: Kawabata Makoto

Acid Mothers Temple & The Melting Paraiso U.F.O. chronology
La Nòvia (2000)	Absolutely Freak Out (Zap Your Mind!!) (2001)	New Geocentric World of Acid Mothers Temple (2001)

Professional ratings
Review scores
Source	Rating
Allmusic	4.5/5 stars

Absolutely Freak Out (Zap Your Mind!!) is an album by the Acid Mothers Temple & The Melting Paraiso U.F.O., released in 2001. It is a double album, featuring four tracks on each disc.

The album was recorded at Acid Mothers Temple from May to July, 2000.

== Track listing ==
Disc one
No.	Title	Writer(s)	Length
1.	"Star Child vs Third Bad Stone"	Cotton Casino, Kawabata Makoto	3:49
2.	"Supernatural Infinite Space" / "Waikiki Easy Meat"	Kawabata / Mano	19:09
3.	"Grapefruit March" / "Virgin U.F.O." / "Let's Have a Ball" / "Pagan Nova"	Tsuyama Atsushi, Kawabata, Ichiraku Yoshimitsu / Suzuki Chisen / Kawabata, Tsuyama, Ichiraku / Kawabata, Tsuyama, Koizumi Hajime	20:19
4.	"Stone Stoner"	Cotton, Kawabata	16:32
Total length:			59:49

Disc two
No.	Title	Writer(s)	Length
1.	"The Incipient Light of the Echoes"	Audrey Ginestet, Kawabata	12:15
2.	"Magic Aum Rock" / "Mercurical Megatronic Meninx"	Jérôme Genin / Johan Wellens, Kawabata, Tsuyama, Ichiraku	7:39
3.	"Children of the Drab" / "Surfin' Paris-Texas" / "Virgin U.F.O. Feed Back"	Cotton, Kawabata, Tsuyama, Ichiraku / Kawabata, Tsuyama, Ichiraku / Suzuki	24:35
4.	"The Kiss That Took a Trip" / "Magic Aum Rock Again" / "Love Is Overborne" / "Fly High"	Cotton, Genin, Stuyama / Genin / Kawabata, Genin / Cotton	19:25
Total length:			63:54

== Personnel ==
- Kawabata Makoto – electric guitars, violin, tambura, cosmic ringmodulator, synthsizer, organ, electric harpsichord, RDS900, vocal, speed guru
- Cotton Casino – vocals, synthesizers, acoustic guitar, beer & cigarettes
- Higashi Hiroshi – electric guitar, synthesizer, bass, vocal, dancin’ king
- Tsuyama Atsushi – monster bass, acoustic guitar, vocal, cosmic joke
- Koizumi Hajime – drums, percussion, sleeping monk
- Ichiraku Yoshimitsu – drums, kendo-stick

Additional personnel

- Emi Nobuko – whisper drums
- Mano Kazuhiko – saxophone
- Suzuki Chisen – vocals
- Magic Aum Gigi (Jérôme Genin) – Jew’s harp, electric guitar, vocal, erotic underground
- Wellens Johan – cosmic narration, freak power
- Ginestet Audrey – voice, cosmos
