= Recurring Dream and Apocalypse of Darkness =

Studio album by Acid Mothers Temple & The Melting Paraiso U.F.O.
- Released: May 13, 2008
- Recorded: December 2007 – January 2008
- Genre: Psychedelic rock, acid rock
- Length: 72:59
- Label: Important Records
- Producer: Kawabata Makoto

Acid Mothers Temple & The Melting Paraiso U.F.O. chronology
41st Century Splendid Man Returns (2007)	Recurring Dream and Apocalypse of Darkness (2008)	Glorify Astrological Martyrdom (2008)

Professional ratings
Review scores
Source	Rating
Lost at Sea	(8/10)
Musique Machine	3/5 stars

Recurring Dream and Apocalypse of Darkness is an album by Acid Mothers Temple & The Melting Paraiso U.F.O., released in 2008 by Important Records.

== Release ==
The album was released on CD and 1000 copy limited edition LP. The LP was available in two colors (orange and white) limited to 200 copies each or on standard black vinyl, limited to 800 copies. The LP version also contained extra two bonus tracks.

== Track listing ==
=== CD ===
All tracks are written by Atsushi and Kawabata.

No.	Title	Writer(s)	Length
1.	"Eternal Incantation or Perpetual Nightmare"	Atsushi, Kawabata	36:29
2.	"Recurring Dream & Apocalypse of Darkness"	Atsushi, Kawabata	36:30
Total length:			72:59

=== LP ===
Side A
No.	Title	Writer(s)	Length
1.	"Eternal Incantation or Perpetual Nightmare Pt. 1"	Atsushi, Kawabata

Side B
No.	Title	Writer(s)	Length
1.	"Eternal Incantation or Perpetual Nightmare Pt. 2"	Atsushi, Kawabata

Side C
No.	Title	Writer(s)	Length
1.	"Recurring Dream & Apocalypse of Darkness Pt 1"	Atsushi, Kawabata

Side D
No.	Title	Writer(s)	Length
1.	"Recurring Dream & Apocalypse of Darkness Pt 2"	Atsushi, Kawabata

== Personnel ==
- Tsuyama Atsushi - Bass, Guitar, Recorder, Vocals, Alto Recorder, Bamboo Flute
- Higashi Hiroshi - Synthesizer
- Makoto Kawabata - Electric Guitar, Tamboura, Producer, Engineer, Tanpura, Audio Production, Audio Engineer
- Shimura Koji - Drums

=== Technical Personnel ===
- Seldon Hunt - Artwork
