= Annuals (band) =

American indie rock band

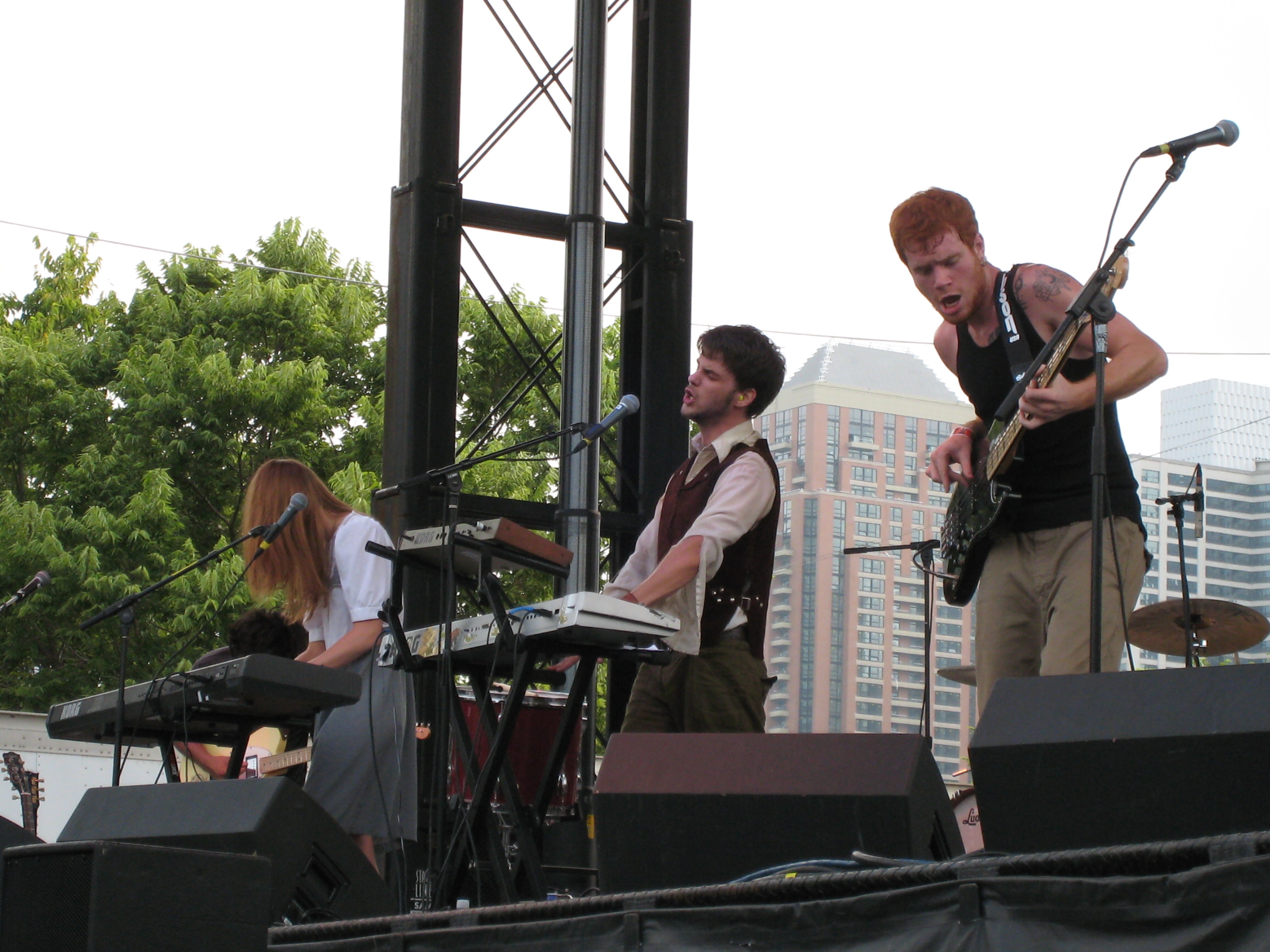
- Annuals at Lollapalooza, 2007

Background information
- Origin: Raleigh, North Carolina, US
- Genres: Indie rock Alternative rock Indie pop Experimental rock
- Years active: 2003–present
- Labels: Canvasback, Ace Fu, Terpsikhore
- Members: Adam Baker; Eric Notarnicola; Jordan Robins; Tim Casey; Britt Rand; Cole Robert Carson
- Past members: Mike Robinson; Kenny Florence; Zack Oden; Nick Radford; Anna Spence; Devin Downey; Josh Pope; George Goodwin
- Website: www.annualsmusic.com

Annuals is the musical project of the American singer, songwriter, producer, and multi-instrumentalist, Adam Baker. Founded in Raleigh, North Carolina, United States in 2003, Annuals first found success following its critically acclaimed 2006 release, Be He Me. As of September 2013, Annuals is based out of Los Angeles.

== History ==
=== Early history ===
Born and raised in Apex, North Carolina, Adam Baker began playing drums at 10 years old. In 2000, Baker formed Timothy's Weekend, a pop-punk band, with future Annuals members, Kenny Florence (lead vocals, guitar) and Mike Robinson (bass). As the band evolved musically, members were added, and Sedona was formed. Sedona (later, Sunfold) featured much of the same lineup as the original Annuals lineup. As in Timothy's Weekend, Florence took the role of lead singer, songwriter and guitarist, with Robinson on bass, Baker on drums, and Zack Oden joining on guitar.

Over the next couple of years, as Baker learned to play other instruments and took up an interest in audio production, he began to write, record and distribute his own songs. These became the first recorded Annuals tracks.

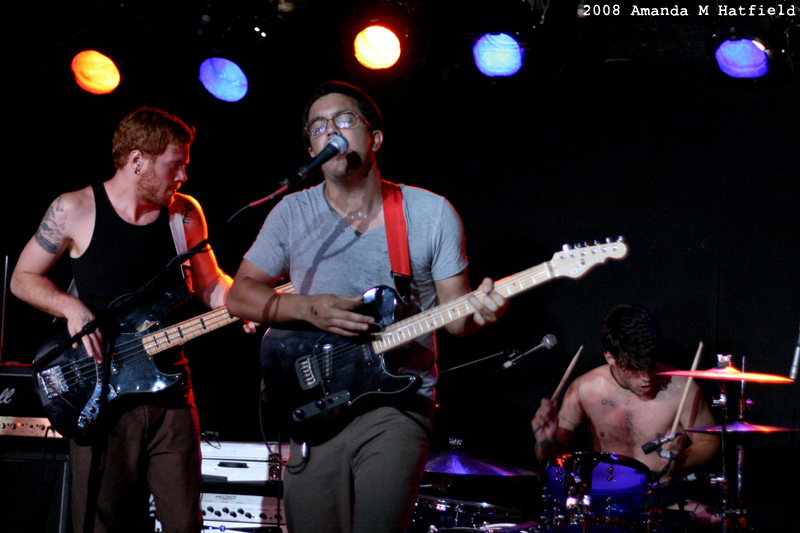
Mike Robinson (bass), Kenny Florence (guitar), and Adam Baker (drums) playing as Sunfold at Mercury Lounge on July 26, 2008

Early demos and releases from both Annuals and Sunfold were initially put out by their own label, Terpsikhore, which was founded by JK Horne and bassist Mike Robinson.

=== Be He Me (2006–2008) ===
In the fall of 2005, Annuals signed with Ace Fu Records, and on October 17, 2006, they released their debut LP, Be He Me. The album exploded on the indie music scene and, thanks in large part to overwhelming coverage in the blogosphere, the band found itself mentioned on just about every "Next Big Thing" and "Bands To Watch" list across the internet in 2006 and 2007, earning them a reputation as a "blog band."

Sample from Be He Me
"Brother" by Annuals

Annuals appeared as the No. 25 entry in Pitchfork’s "Infinite Mixtape" series with their song "Brother" and received extensive coverage in such publications as Rolling Stone, Spin, Paste, Stereogum, Filter, NME, BrooklynVegan and AbsolutePunk, and others.

Be He Me would go on to sell over 5,000 copies by years' end and, as of September 2013, has sold over 19,000 total copies.

On June 17, 2007, Annuals released Frelen Mas, an eight-song collection of B-sides from Be He Me.

On the heels of the startling success of Be He Me, Annuals signed with Sony imprint, Canvasback Music, and on April 1, 2008, released Wet Zoo, a 5-song split-EP with sister band, Sunfold. The five-song album featured three tracks by Annuals and two contributions from Sunfold.

=== Such Fun & Sweet Sister (2008–2011) ===
Annuals' second full-length album, Such Fun, was released on October 7, 2008, via Canvasback/Terpsikhore and was met with mostly positive reviews. A far more polished product than its predecessor, the album was co-produced by Grammy award-winning producer Jacquire King (Tom Waits, Modest Mouse, Dawes) and features an original Bob Ross painting as the cover art.

On May 4, 2010, on the heels of their departure from Canvasback, Annuals released Sweet Sister on Banter Media. Written, recorded and produced entirely by Baker, the 5-song EP featured four original songs and one cover (Johnny Cash's "Flesh and Blood”), and showcased yet another evolution in the band's sound. Softer, more polished vocals and intricate, electronic Latin rhythms pushed the Annuals sound in yet another new direction.

Sample from Sweet Sister
“Loxtep” by Annuals

=== Time Stamp (2012–present) ===
In January 2012, it was announced on the band's Facebook page that a forthcoming studio album, Born Raised, was nearing completion and would be released later that year. The album would be delayed, however, and by the time of its release, the title would be changed, due in part to the similarly titled album Born and Raised by John Mayer.

On April 23, 2013, after sitting in "near completed form for almost 18 months," Annuals self-released their long-awaited follow up to Such Fun, Time Stamp. A digital-only release, the album was initially released via Bandcamp and is now available for purchase on iTunes, Amazon, and various other music downloading sites.

Accompanying the release was the following note from the band:

This is Time Stamp. Whether it's a swan song, a comeback, or something else... Even we aren't sure. This is the first Annuals full length in nearly five years with just five songs in between, and even those songs from Sweet Sister (which were supposed to be a quick "hold-you-over") have gathered some dust. There have been good, bad, hard, and harder times since our departure from Canvasback and Columbia records in 2010. It seems we've all individually landed on our feet but for better or worse in different, separate places. The majority of Time Stamp has sat in a near-completed form for almost 18 months, the final stretch towards completion would cost the band essentially all of the money it had left to its name. It's here now, with some measured degree of hope, that people will care enough to see that this might be a last ditch effort. We know we have friends and fans across the USA and beyond, we've met you and we've shared many joyful evenings together over the years. We skipped the crowd funding and went straight to getting out a final product. We hope you care about the project, can put something back into it, and to share it with your friends and loved ones. Thank you for all of the love and support you've afforded us all these years. This is for y'all.

=== Move to Los Angeles and new album ===
In September 2013, following what the band announced was their "last show for the foreseeable future", Adam Baker relocated to Los Angeles, where he began work on the band's fourth full-length release.

New band members Tim Casey (drums), Britt Rand (keys), Jordan Robins (guitar), Eric Notarnicola (bass) came on board to form the new lineup.

== Music style and influences ==
Since their incarnation, Annuals have drawn comparisons to countless artists and combinations of genres from just about any publication that has attempted to categorize their sound. Rolling Stone once described Annuals as “the Tar Heel State’s version of the Arcade Fire”, and Pitchfork deemed them a “fantasy hybrid of Animal Collective, Arcade Fire and Broken Social Scene". While NME has suggested that the band's members may have been “cloned in a Petri-dish from the LSD-twisted DNA of Wayne Coyne”, Soundcheck magazine posited the term “neo-baroque pop” as a general description for the band's aesthetic.

In a 2009 interview with LAist, Baker cited Mike Patton (Faith No More, Mr. Bungle), Brian Wilson and the Beach Boys, Hank Williams Sr., Johnny Cash, Radiohead, Bjork, and Secret Chiefs 3 among his major influences. He credits his mother for his “beach” music influences and his father for his Motown and country influences.

== Television and licensing ==
Annuals made their national television debut on Late Night with Conan O'Brien performing the song "Carry Around", and came back in October 2008 for a second show, playing "Confessor", the opening track from their album, Such Fun.

Their song "Fair" appeared on the January 24, 2007 episode of Veronica Mars ("Show Me the Monkey").

== Band members ==
Current

- Adam Baker - Producer/Vocals/Guitar/Percussion (2003–Present)
- Tim Casey - Drums/Guitar (2014–Present)
- Jordan Robins - Guitar/Vocals (2014–Present)
- Eric Notarnicola - Bass/Vocals (2014–Present)
- Britt Rand - Keyboard/Vocals (2015–Present)
- Cole Robert Carson - Drums (2015–Present)

Past

- Kenny Florence - Lead Guitar/Vocals/Percussion (2003-2011)
- Mike Robinson - Bass (2003-2013)
- Zack Oden - Guitar/Drums (2003-2013)
- Nick Radford - Drums (2003-2012)
- Anna Spence - Keyboard/Vocals (2003-2010)
- Devin Downey - Keys/Percussion/Vocals (2010-2013)
- Matt Ramey - Guitar/Vocals (2012-2013)
- Josh Pope - Bass (2003)
- George Goodwin - Drums (2003)

== Discography ==
=== Studio albums ===
- Be He Me (Ace Fu, 2006)
- Such Fun (Canvasback, 2008)
- Count the Rings (Souterrain Transmissions, 2010)
- Time Stamp (self-released, digital-only, 2013)

=== Extended plays ===
- Git' Got (Terpsikhore, 2006)
- Big Zeus (Ace Fu, UK-only, 2007)
- Frelen Mas (Ace Fu, digital-only, 2007)
- Wet Zoo (Canvasback/Terpsikhore, 2008)
- Sweet Sister (Banter, 2010)

=== Singles ===
- "Brother" (Virgin Records Ltd., 2007)
- "Fair" (Ace Fu, 2007)
- "Confessor" (Canvasback, 2008)

=== Miscellaneous ===
- Lay Down Dry (Terpsikhore, 2005)
