= Be He Me =

Studio album by Annuals
- Released: October 17, 2006
- Genre: Indie pop
- Length: 49:38
- Label: Ace Fu

Annuals chronology
Git Got (2006)	Be He Me (2006)	Big Zeus (2006)

Be He Me is the debut album by Annuals, released on October 17, 2006 under Ace Fu Records. It was recorded at the Magic Shop Recording Studios in SoHo, New York City.

Professional ratings
Review scores
Source	Rating
AbsolutePunk.net	(86%) link
AllMusic	link
NME	(8/10) link
Pitchfork	(7.8/10) link
Spin	link
Stylus Magazine	B+ link
This Is Fake DIY	link

== Track listing ==
All tracks are written by Adam Baker.

No.	Title	Length
1.	"Brother"	3:43
2.	"Dry Clothes"	3:46
3.	"Complete, or Completing"	5:46
4.	"Carry Around"	3:18
5.	"Chase You Off"	3:54
6.	"Bleary-Eyed"	3:04
7.	"Fair"	4:35
8.	"The Bull, and the Goat"	4:05
9.	"Mama"	2:36
10.	"Ida, My"	2:31
11.	"Father"	5:15
12.	"Sway"	7:05
