= Dark Side of the Black Moon: What Planet Are We On? =

Studio album by Acid Mothers Temple & The Melting Paraiso U.F.O.
- Released: June 23, 2009
- Recorded: February 2009
- Genres: Psychedelic rock, acid rock
- Label: Important Records
- Producer: Kawabata Makoto

Acid Mothers Temple & The Melting Paraiso U.F.O. chronology
Are We Experimental? (2009)	Dark Side of the Black Moon: What Planet Are We On? (2009)	In 0 to ∞ (2010)

Professional ratings
Review scores
Source	Rating
KEXP-FM	(favorable)

Dark Side of the Black Moon: What Planet Are We On? is an album by Acid Mothers Temple & The Melting Paraiso U.F.O., released in 2009 by Important Records. The album was released on CD and LP. The LP release was limited to 100 copies on blue vinyl and 100 copies on clear vinyl.

== Track listing ==
No.	Title	Lyrics	Music	Length
1.	"Space Labyrinth or Eclipse on Friday"	Tsuyama	Kawabata, Tsuyama, Shimura	13:41
2.	"Astro Kama Sutra: Take Me to the Outer Limits"	Tsuyama	Kawabata, Tsuyama, Shimura	6:53
3.	"Blessing of the Load Galaxy"	Tsuyama	Tsuyama	3:59
4.	"Space a Go Go"		Kawabata, Tsuyama, Shimura	8:05
5.	"Dark Side of the Black Moon"	Tsuyama	Kawabata, Tsuyama, Shimura	17:05

=== Vinyl Edition ===
The tracks Universe In Witch's Blue and Intergalactic Space Trackin' are exclusive to the vinyl edition.

Side A1
No.	Title	Length
1.	"Space Labyrinth or Eclipse on Friday"	13:41
2.	"Astro Kama Sutra: Take Me to the Outer Limits"	6:53

Side B1
No.	Title	Lyrics	Music	Length
1.	"Universe In Witch's Blue"	Tsuyama	Kawabata, Tsuyama, Shimura
2.	"Space a Go Go"			8:05

Side A2
No.	Title	Music	Length
1.	"Blessing of the Load Galaxy"		3:59
2.	"Intergalactic Space Trackin'"	Kawabata

Side B2
No.	Title	Length
1.	"Dark Side of the Black Moon"	17:05

== Personnel ==
- Kawabata Makoto - Electric Guitar, Bouzouki, Sitar], Violin, Speed Guru
- Tsuyama Atsushi - Monster Bass, Voice, Acoustic Guitar, Cosmic Joker
- Shimura Koji - Drums, Latino Cool
- Higashi Hiroshi - Synthesizer, Dancin' King

=== Technical personnel ===
- produced & engineered by Kawabata Makoto
- digital mastered by Yoshida Tatsuya
- packaging designed by Seldon Hunt
