= Cometary Orbital Drive =

Studio album by Acid Mothers Temple & The Melting Paraiso U.F.O.
- Released: December 9, 2008
- Recorded: August – September 2008
- Genres: Psychedelic rock, acid rock
- Label: Bam Balam.Records
- Producer: Kawabata Makoto

Acid Mothers Temple & The Melting Paraiso U.F.O. chronology
| Glorify Astrological Martyrdom (2008) | Cometary Orbital Drive (2008) | Interstellar Guru and Zero (2009) |

Cometary Orbital Drive is an album by Acid Mothers Temple & The Melting Paraiso U.F.O., released in 2008 by Bam Balam Records. The Vinyl LP version is titled Episodes of Cometary Orbital Drive and contains a different mix, but does not contain the entire album. It was released by Bam Balam Records, a French label from Bordeaux.

== Track listing ==
=== CD ===
Cometary Orbital Drive Suite
| No. | Title | Writer(s) | Length |
|---|---|---|---|
| 1. | "Light My Fire Ball" | Tsuyama, Kawabata, Shimura | 12:51 |
| 2. | "Planet Billions Of Light-Years Away" | Kawabata | 26:44 |
| 3. | "Circular System 7777777" | Kawabata | 17:50 |
| 4. | "Milky Way Star" | Kawabata | 13:32 |

=== Episodes Of Cometary Orbital Drive LP ===
Side A
| No. | Title | Writer(s) | Length |
|---|---|---|---|
| 1. | "Milky Way Star From Planet Billions Of Light-Years Away" | Kawabata |

Side B
| No. | Title | Writer(s) | Length |
|---|---|---|---|
| 1. | "Circular System 7777777" | Kawabata |

== Personnel ==
Credits, as stated on the liner notes:

- Tsuyama Atsushi - bass, voice, cosmic joker
- Higashi Hiroshi - synth, guitar, voice, dancin' king
- Shimura Koji - drums, Latino cool
- Kawabata Makoto - guitar, voice, speed guru.

=== Technical personnel ===
- Kawabata Makoto - production & engineering
- Yoshida Tatsuya - digital mastering
- Niko Potocnjak - art work
