= Interstellar Guru and Zero =

Studio album by Acid Mothers Temple & The Melting Paraiso U.F.O.
- Released: April 28, 2009
- Genre: Psychedelic rock, acid rock
- Label: Homeopathic Records
- Producer: Kawabata Makoto

Acid Mothers Temple & The Melting Paraiso U.F.O. chronology
Cometary Orbital Drive (2008)	Interstellar Guru and Zero (2009)	Lord of the Underground: Vishnu and the Magic Elixir (2009)

Professional ratings
Review scores
Source	Rating
AllMusic	3.5/5 stars
Drowned in Sound	5/10 stars

Interstellar Guru and Zero is an album by Acid Mothers Temple & The Melting Paraiso U.F.O., released in 2009 by Homeopathic Records.

== Track listing ==
All lyrics are written by Tsuyama Atsushi; all music is composed by Kawabata Makoto

No.	Title	Writer(s)	Length
1.	"Astral Projection From Holy Shangrila"	Atsushi, Kawabata	18:27
2.	"Interstellar Guru and Zero"	Atsushi, Kawabata	39:02

== Personnel ==
Credits, as stated on the liner notes:

- Tsuyama Atsushi - monster bass, tortoiseshell guitar, voice, cosmic joker
- Higashi Hiroshi - synthesizer, dancin'king
- Shimura Koji - drums, Latino cool
- Kawabata Makoto - electric guitar, acoustic guitar, sitar, voice, RDS900, synthesizer, organ, tape-loop, speed guru

=== Technical personnel ===
- Kawabata Makoto - Production and Engineering
- Niko Potočnjak - Artwork
