= Crystal Rainbow Pyramid Under the Stars =

Studio album by Acid Mothers Temple & The Melting Paraiso U.F.O.
- Released: May 29, 2007
- Recorded: January – October 2006
- Genres: Psychedelic rock, acid rock
- Length: 69:58
- Label: Important Records
- Producer: Kawabata Makoto

Acid Mothers Temple & The Melting Paraiso U.F.O. chronology
Myth of the Love Electrique (2006)	Crystal Rainbow Pyramid Under the Stars (2007)	Nam Myo Ho Ren Ge Kyo (2007)

Professional ratings
Review scores
Source	Rating
AllMusic	4.5/5 stars
Tiny Mix Tapes	2.5/5 stars

Crystal Rainbow Pyramid Under the Stars is an album by Acid Mothers Temple & The Melting Paraiso U.F.O., released in 2007 by Important Records. A vinyl tour LP also released by Important Records in 2007 under the shortened name Crystal Rainbow Pyramid containing the title track and a bonus track. The tour LP was limited to 1000 copies on splatter color vinyl.

Crystal Rainbow Pyramid Under the Stars is also the first album with Kitagawa Hao on vocals.

== Track listing ==
=== CD Version ===
No.	Title	Lyrics	Music	Length
1.	"Pussy Head Man from Outer Space"	Kitagawa	Kawabata, Tsuyama, Shimura	7:42
2.	"Crystal Rainbow Pyramid"	Tsuyama, Kitagawa	Kawabata	21:56
3.	"Electric Psilocybin Flashback"	Kitagawa	Kawabata	40:20
Total length:				69:58

=== Vinyl Version ===
Side 1
No.	Title	Lyrics	Music	Length
1.	"Crystal Rainbow Pyramid"	Tsuyama, Kitagawa	Kawabata	21:56

Side 2
No.	Title	Lyrics	Music	Length
1.	"Blues For The Narcotic Kangaroo"	Kitagawa	Kawabata, Tsuyama, Shimura

== Credits ==
Credits, as stated on the Acid Mothers website:

- Kitagawa Hao - voice, hot spice & alcohol
- Tsuyama Atsushi - monster bass, voice, cosmic joker
- Higashi Hiroshi - synthesizer, dancin' king
- Shimura Koji - drums, Latino cool
- Ono Ryoko - alto sax, aesthetic perverted karman
- Kawabata Makoto - electric guitar, electronics, speed guru
