= IAO Chant from the Melting Paraiso Underground Freak Out =

Rock Album by Acid Mothers Temple

IAO Chant From The Melting Paraiso Underground Freak Out

Studio album by Acid Mothers Temple & the Melting Paraiso U.F.O.
- Released: November 12, 2012
- Recorded: 2012
- Genre: Psychedelic rock, acid rock
- Length: 39:04
- Label: Riot Season
- Producer: Kawabata Makoto

Acid Mothers Temple & the Melting Paraiso U.F.O. chronology
Son of a Bitches Brew (2012)	IAO Chant From The Melting Paraiso Underground Freak Out (2012)	Cometary Orbital Drive to 2199 (2013)

IAO Chant From The Melting Paraiso Underground Freak Out is an album by Acid Mothers Temple & the Melting Paraiso U.F.O. released by Riot Season in 2012. The album contains one piece, divided into two approximately 20-minute-long parts, based on the Gong song Master Builder. This marks the second time Acid Mothers Temple have covered Master Builder, again retitled as OM Riff, having previously covered it on IAO Chant From The Cosmic Inferno.

The album was released on both CD and a red-splattered vinyl LP, which was limited to 500 copies. A black vinyl LP repressing on 300 copies was released in 2013.

== Track listing ==
No.	Title	Length
1.	"OM Riff From The Melting Paraiso U.F.O. Part 1"	19:38
2.	"OM Riff From The Melting Paraiso U.F.O. Part 2"	19:26

== Personnel ==
- Tsuyama Atsushi - bass, cosmic joker
- Tabata Mitsuru - guitar, guitar synthesizer, maratab
- Higashi Hiroshi - synthesizer, dancin'king
- Shimura Koji - drums, latino cool
- Kawabata Makoto - guitar, yangqin, tambour, voice, tape, speed guru
- Cotton Casino - space whisper, beer & cigarette

=== Technical personnel ===
- Kawabata Makoto - production, engineering and mixing
- Yoshida Tatsuya - digital mastering
- Andrew Smith - Artwork
- Miyawaki Shintaro - Band photography
