= Essence Music =

- Founded: 2003
- Founder: Uirajara Resende; Iremir Oscar
- Distributor(s): Darla (US); Cargo (UK); Clear Spot (Europe)
- Genre: Dark ambient; drone; drone metal; noise; psychedelic rock
- Country of origin: Brazil
- Location: Juiz de Fora
- Official website: essence-music.com

Essence Music is an independent record label based in Juiz de Fora, Brazil. All the albums are released in a standard edition and a special edition, which is a hand-made box including the standard edition of the album, various inserts, and usually a bonus disc.

== Artists ==
- Acid Mothers Temple & The Cosmic Inferno
- Acid Mothers Temple & The Melting Paraiso U.F.O.
- Atomine Elektrine
- Aidan Baker
- Boris
- Circle
- Drakh
- Expo '70
- Merzbow
- Muslimgauze
- Nadja
- Nordvargr
- Numinous Eye
- Rapoon
- Suishou no Fune
- Troum
- Raison d'être
- Up-Tight
- Wolfskin
