= List of Acid Mothers Temple band members =

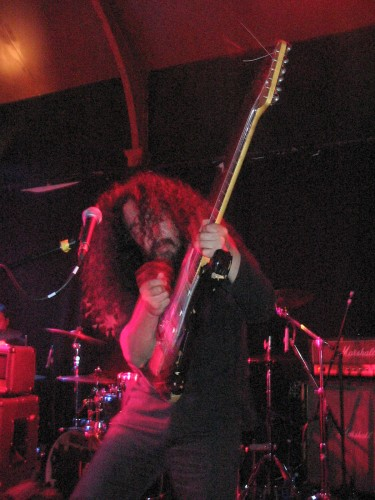
Kawabata Makoto on stage with Acid Mothers Temple in London in 2005

This is a list of band members from Japanese rock music ensemble Acid Mothers Temple and related musical groups.

== Acid Mothers Temple and the Melting Paraiso U.F.O. ==
The most prolific and widely known of the various Acid Mothers Temple collectives, Acid Mothers Temple & the Melting Paraiso U.F.O. is a 5-piece that plays mostly psychedelic, space-rock type music. Their pieces are often improvised, free-form or experimental, while incorporating elements of American psych rock, drone and world music.

Current touring members (2023) of Acid Mothers Temple & the Melting Paraiso U.F.O.

- Kawabata Makoto – guitars, vocals, "speed guru" (1995–present)
- Higashi Hiroshi – synthesizer, keyboards, guitars, vocals, "noodle god" (1998–present)
- Jyonson Tsu – vocal, guitar, bouzouki, electronics, "midnight whistler" (2017, 2018–present)
- Satoshima Nani – drums, "another dimension" (2014–present)
- Taigen Kawabe (Sawano Shozo) – bass, vocals (2020–present)
- Ron Anderson – bass (2023 North American Tour)

Previous members

- Cotton Casino – synthesizer, vocals (1995–2004, 2013)
- Koizumi Hajime – drums (1995–2001, 2002, 2003–2005)
- Suhara Keizo – bass guitar (1995–1998)
- Yasuda Hisashi – bass guitar (1998)
- Ichiraku Yoshimitsu – drums (2001–2002, 2009)
- Audrey Gineset – vocals, bass guitar, piano (2001)
- Magic Aum Gigi – harp (2002)
- Uki Eiji – drums (2002, 2005–2006)
- Okano Futoshi – drums (2002–2003)
- Ono Ryoko – saxophone, flute (2005–2006, 2007)
- Nao – vocals (2005–2006)
- Kitagawa Hao – theremin, vocals (2006–2007)
- Shimura Koji – drums (2006–2014)
- Tsuyama Atsushi – bass guitar, vocals (1998–2015)
- Tabata Mitsuru – guitars, vocals, "hugs & kisses" (2012–2017)
- Wolf (a.k.a. S/T), – bass guitar, "space & time" (2016–2020)

== Kawabata Makoto and the Mothers of Invasion ==
sometimes playing under the name "What?"
Current members

- Kawabata Makoto – guitar (2001–present)
- Tabata Mitsuru – bass guitar (2002–present)
- Mori Kimiho – drums (2002–present)
- Higashi Hiroshi – synthesisers (2002–present)

Former members

- Tsuyama Atsushi – bass guitar (2001–2002)
- Ichiraku Yoshimitsu – drums (2001–2002)

== Acid Mothers Temple SWR ==
(previously known as Acid Mothers Temple mode HHH and Seikazoku)

SWR is an experimental, free-jazz trio composed of Tsuyama, Kawabata, and Japanese experimental rock guru Yoshida Tatsuya of Ruins.

Current members

- Kawabata Makoto – guitar, bouzouki, electronics (2003–present)
- Tsuyama Atsushi – bass guitar, vocals (2003–present)
- Yoshida Tatsuya – drums, percussion, vocals (2003–present)

== Acid Mothers Gong ==
Former members

- Kawabata Makoto – guitar (2003–2006)
- Daevid Allen – vocals, guitar (2003–2006)
- Josh Pollock – guitar, megaphone (2003–2006)
- Cotton Casino – synth, voices (2003–2006)
- Gilli Smyth – vocals (2003–2006)
- Higashi Hiroshi – synthesizer (2003–2006)
- Yoshida Tatsuya – drums, vocals (2003–2006)
- Tsuyami Atsushi – bass guitar, vocals (2003–2006)

== Acid Mothers Afrirampo ==
Acid Mothers Afrirampo is essentially the core three members of Acid Mothers Temple plus the two members of Afrirampo. Acid Mothers Afrirampo's music is closer to free jazz with experimental elements. There is also a strong focus on the drums.

Current members

- Kawabata Makoto – electric guitar, violin, hurdygurdy, glockenspiel, percussion, electronics, vocals (2004–present)
- Tsuyama Atsushi – vocals, bass guitar, drums, digital guitar, acoustic guitar, soprano recorder, kantele (2004–present)
- Higashi Hiroshi – electronics (2004–present)
- Oni – vocals, electric guitar, digital guitar, soprano recorder, drums (2004–present)
- Pika – vocals, drums, percussion, noise (2004–present)

== Acid Mothers Temple and the Cosmic Inferno ==
Acid Mothers Temple & the Cosmic Inferno differs from the Melting Paraiso U.F.O. not only in line-up but also in style of music. The Cosmic Inferno generally plays much heavier, hard-rock inspired psychedelia, and experiments more with effects pedals.

Current members

- Kawabata Makoto – guitar, bouzouki, electronics (2005–present)
- Higashi Hiroshi – synthesizer, guitar (2005–present)
- Tabata Mitsuru – bass guitar, vocals (2005–present)
- Shimura Koji – drums, percussion (2005–present)

Former members

- Okano Futoshi – drums (2005–2008)
- Pikachu – drums, vocals (2008)
- Audrey Ginestet – vocals (2008)

== Acid Mothers Temple and the Pink Ladies Blues ==
The Pink Ladies Blues is another Acid Mothers Temple side-project, notable largely because it does not include Kawabata Makoto. In fact, that trio is led by Magic Aum Gigi, who was a member of Acid Mothers Temple in 2002. Their music is traditional blues and psychedelic.

Current members

- Magic Aum Gigi – electric guitar (2005–present)
- Tsuchy – electric guitar (2005–present)
- Mai Mai – drums (2005–present)

== Acid Mothers Temple and the Incredible Strange Band ==
Current members

- Kawabata Makoto – electric sitar, violin, hurdy-gurdy (2006–present)
- Tsuyama Atsushi – guitar, vocals (2006–present)
- Tsuyama Akiko – vocals (2006–present)
- Suhara Keizo – bass guitar (2006–present)
- Aiko – drums (2006–present)

== Acid Mothers Guru Guru ==
(previously known as Acid Gurus Temple)

Acid Mothers Guru Guru was founded on a concept similar to SWR, but instead features the drumming of Krautrock drummer Mani Neumeier of Guru Guru.

Current members

- Kawabata Makoto – guitar, bouzouki, electronics (2006–present)
- Tsuyama Atsushi – bass guitar, vocals (2006–present)
- Mani Neumeier – drums, vocals (2006–present)

== MMMH! ==
- Kawabata Makoto – guitar (2009–present)
- Julien Barbagallo – drums, vocals (2009–present)
- Julien Gasc – guitars, keyboards, vocals (2009–present)
- Benjamin Glibert – guitars, vocals (2009–present)
- Audrey Ginestet – bass, vocals (2009–present)
- Manon Glibert – clarinet (2009–present)
- Latifa Forestier – trumpet, theremin, backing vocals (2009–present)
- Francois Gout – organ, backing vocals (2009–present)
- Fanny Harney – drums (2009–present)
- Alexandre Piques – drums (2009–present)
- Olve Strelow – drums (2009–present)

to release debut LP/CD on Manimal Vinyl in October 2009

== Acid Mothers Temple and Space Paranoid ==
Acid Mothers Temple & Space Paranoid is the more hard rock leaning, heavily Black Sabbath influenced iteration of Acid Mothers Temple.

Current members

- Tabata Mitsuru – bass, voice, maratab (2013–present)
- Higashi Hiroshi – synthesizer (2013–present)
- Okano Futoshi – drums (2013–present)
- Kawabata Makoto – guitars (2013–present)
