= Starless and Bible Black Sabbath =

Studio album by Acid Mothers Temple and The Cosmic Inferno
- Released: February 21, 2006
- Recorded: May 2005
- Genres: Experimental rock Psychedelic rock
- Length: 40:43
- Label: Alien8
- Producer: Kawabata Makoto

Acid Mothers Temple and The Cosmic Inferno chronology
IAO Chant From The Cosmic Inferno (2005)	Starless and Bible Black Sabbath (2006)	Ominous From The Cosmic Inferno (2007)

Professional ratings
Review scores
Source	Rating
Allmusic	4/5 stars
Pitchfork	(6/10)
PopMatters	7/10 stars

Starless and Bible Black Sabbath is an album and song by the Japanese group The Acid Mothers Temple and the Cosmic Inferno. The album's title refers to the album Starless and Bible Black by King Crimson and the band Black Sabbath, and, more specifically, their self-titled debut album. The album cover also is very similar to the self-titled Black Sabbath album, except featuring group member Kawabata Makoto instead of a woman on the album cover.

== Overview ==
The song "Starless and Bible Black Sabbath" begins in a similar fashion to Black Sabbath’s eponymous opening track on their debut album, but less dramatic. The song grows slowly until a third of the way through the track vocals appear. The vocals have a large echo effect and there are two drummers playing virtually the same drum beat during a lot of the track, but with slightly different timing.

The second song, "Woman from a Hell" is a much faster and shorter track. As the song closes there is a Godzilla roar.

== Track listing ==
1. "Starless and Bible Black Sabbath" (Kawabata/Tabata) – 34:29
2. "Woman from a Hell" (Kawabata/Tabata) – 6:14

== Personnel ==
- Kawabata Makoto - Guitar, Producer, Engineer, Sound technician
- Tabata Mitsuru - Bass, vocals
- Higashi Hiroshi - Synthesizer
- Okano Futoshi - drums, consultant
- Shimura Koji - Drums
