= Escapade (band) =

Escapade is a NYC space rock/post-rock band formed in 1996 by ex-Drunken Boat drummer Hadley Kahn. Their music is similar in spirit to Krautrock, while variously taking in influences of psychedelia, avant garde, minimalism, ambient and even jazz.

They're frequently noted for their strong improvisational abilities. Even the last minute substitution at a live show of a bassist who'd never before played with Escapade is said not to have affected the band's performance.

Early albums have more of a jam based character than later works. But instead of the jam band staple of individual members soloing over musical riffs, Escapade's approach is more akin to the King Crimson or Can style of improvising collectively from the ground up. 1998's Citrus Cloud Cover was the last album to strictly employ this method.

Following this album, the prominence of synths and electronics slowly gave way to a more guitar-oriented sound. Subtle editing and overdubbing also began to be used, though the music was still fundamentally improvised.

In 2003, a CD was released which was split between them and Japanese psych collective Acid Mothers Temple, entitled A Thousand Shades of Grey. Their contribution to the split CD and its 2006 follow-up But Distractions Abound both find Escapade increasingly focusing on hypnotic repetition ala Neu! or Finland's Circle.

The band is seemingly disbanded or on hiatus.

== Band members ==
- Paul Casanova - Guitars, Electronics
- John Ortega - Processed Bass, Synths
- Rob Giffen - Guitars, Effects
- Hadley Kahn - Drums
- Russell Giffen - Bass
- Paul Hilzinger - Synths, Sampler, Processing
- Joey Murphy - Bass, Guitar

== Guests ==
- Jane Scarpantoni - Cello
- Jon DeRosa - Guitar, Tambura
- Robb Ross - Flute

== Discography ==
- 1996 – Searching For The Elusive Rainbow (CD)
- 1997 – Inner Translucence (CD)
- 1997 – Obscured Dialogues (CDR)
- 1998 – Citrus Cloud Cover (2CD)
- 1999 – Due to a Faulty Premonition (CD)
- 2000 – Remembrance of Things Unknown (CD)
- 2002 – Rule No. 3 (CD)
- 2003 – A Thousand Shades of Grey split w/ ACID MOTHERS TEMPLE (CD)
- 2004 – If/Or (live, recorded 1996) (CDR)
- 2006 – Just When, Just How (CDR)
- 2006 – But Distractions Abound (CD)
