= Magical Power from Mars =

Studio album by Acid Mothers Temple & The Melting Paraiso U.F.O.
- Released: 2003
- Recorded: 2002–2003
- Genre: Psychedelic rock, acid rock
- Label: Important Records
- Producer: Kawabata Makoto

Acid Mothers Temple & The Melting Paraiso U.F.O. chronology
St. Captain Freak Out & the Magic Bamboo Request (2002)	Magical Power from Mars (2003)	Hypnotic Liquid Machine from the Golden Utopia (2004)

Magical Power from Mars is an album by Acid Mothers Temple & The Melting Paraiso U.F.O., released in 2003 by Important Records. Three of the tracks, "Ziggy Sitar Dust Raga," "Diamond Doggy Peggy" and "Cosmic Funky Dolly," were originally released by Important Records as separate three-inch CD singles, but were later combined into this album, with the bonus track, "Aladdin Kane."

== Track listing ==
No.	Title	Lyrics	Music	Length
1.	"Ziggy Sitar Dust Raga"	Cotton	Cotton	19:42
2.	"Diamond Doggy Peggy"	Cotton	Kawabata, Tsuyama, Okano	15:05
3.	"Aladdin Kane"	Kawabata	Tsuyama	14:50
4.	"Cosmic Funky Dolly"	Cotton	Kawabata	20:01

== Credits ==
Credits, as stated on the Acid Mothers website:

1. Cotton Casino - vocal, synthesizer, sitar, beer & cigarette
2. Tsuyama Atsushi - monster bass, vocal, bamboo clarinet, turtle guitar, cosmic joke
3. Higashi Hiroshi - synthesizer, dancin'king
4. Okano - drums, god speed
5. Kawabata Makoto - guitar, tambura, direct touching a resister, synthesizer, hammond organ, speed guru
