= Minstrel in the Galaxy =

Studio album by Acid Mothers Temple & The Melting Paraiso U.F.O.
- Released: November 8, 2004
- Recorded: April – July 2004
- Genre: Psychedelic rock, acid rock
- Length: 51:42
- Label: Riot Season
- Producer: Kawabata Makoto

Acid Mothers Temple & The Melting Paraiso U.F.O. chronology
Does the Cosmic Shepherd Dream of Electric Tapirs? (2004)	Minstrel in the Galaxy (2004)	Close Encounters of the Mutants (2004)

Professional ratings
Review scores
Source	Rating
AllMusic	4/5 stars

Minstrel in the Galaxy is an album by Acid Mothers Temple & The Melting Paraiso U.F.O., released in 2004 by Riot Season. This was the first Acid Mothers Temple album not to feature Cotton Casino on vocals, instead featuring Afrirampo members, Oni & Pikacyu. The album title is a play on the name of the Jethro Tull album Minstrel in the Gallery.

== Track listing ==
No.	Title	Lyrics	Music	Length
1.	"Cosmic Introduction"	Tiffany	Tsuyama	3:08
2.	"Minstrel in the Galaxy"	Tsuyama, Oni & Pikacyu	Tsuyama	41:38
3.	"At Bel Canta"	Tsuyama	Tsuyama	6:56
Total length:				51:42

== Personnel ==
- Tsuyama Atsushi - monster bass, vocal, acoustic guitar, cosmic joker
- Higashi Hiroshi - synthesizer, guitar, dancin'king
- Koizumi Hajime - drums, sleeping monk
- Kawabata Makoto - guitar, sarangi, bouzouki, tambura, speed guru

=== Guests ===
- Tiffany - voice on "Cosmic Introduction"
- Oni & Pikacyu (from Afrirampo) - voice on "Minstrel In The Galaxy"

=== Technical personnel ===
- Kawabata Makoto - Production and Engineering, Photography
- Yoshida Tatsuya - Mastering
- Kawabata Sachiko - Artwork
