= In C (album) =

Studio album by Acid Mothers Temple & The Melting Paraiso U.F.O.
- Released: October 2001
- Genre: Psychedelic rock, acid rock
- Label: Eclipse Records, Squealer
- Producer: Kawabata Makoto

Acid Mothers Temple & The Melting Paraiso U.F.O. chronology
New Geocentric World of Acid Mothers Temple (2001)	In C (2001)	41st Century Splendid Man (2002)

Professional ratings
Review scores
Source	Rating
AllMusic	4/5 stars
Pitchfork Media	(8.2/10)

In C is an album by Acid Mothers Temple & The Melting Paraiso U.F.O., released in 2001 by Eclipse Records as a vinyl record and in 2002 by Squealer Music on CD. The Squealer release contains a bonus track. The title track is a performance of the Terry Riley piece of the same name.

A follow-up album, titled In 0 to ∞, was released in 2010.

== Reception ==
In C made Pitchfork Media's "Top 50 Albums of 2002," at #45.

== Track listing ==
No.	Title	Writer(s)	Length
1.	"In C"	Terry Riley	20:31
2.	"In E"	Kawabata, Tsuyama, Ichiraku, Higashi	16:30
3.	"In D" (CD Bonus Track)	Kawabata	19:47

== Personnel ==
Personnel as listed on Acid Mothers website.

- Cotton Casino - voice
- Tsuyama Atsushi - monster bass, voice
- Higashi Hiroshi - electric guitar, synthesizer
- Ichiraku Yoshimitsu - drums
- Kawabata Makoto - electric guitars, violin, zuruna, synthesizer, tambura, sruthi box

Additional personnel

- Terukina Noriko - vibraphone, glockenspiel

=== Technical personnel ===
- Kawabata Makoto - Production and Engineering
- Sachiko@ELF design - Artwork
- Willam Lazorchak - Artwork
- Ishida Yoko - Cover Photo
- Yoshida Tatsuya - Stonehenge Photo
