= Acid Motherly Love =

Studio album by Acid Mothers Temple & The Melting Paraiso U.F.O.
- Released: November 19, 2007
- Recorded: June to August 2007
- Genre: Psychedelic rock, acid rock
- Label: Riot Season
- Producer: Kawabata Makoto

Acid Mothers Temple & The Melting Paraiso U.F.O. chronology
Nam Myo Ho Ren Ge Kyo (2007)	Acid Motherly Love (2007)	41st Century Splendid Man Returns (2007)

Acid Motherly Love is an album by the Acid Mothers Temple & The Melting Paraiso U.F.O., released in 2007 by Riot Season. It is their first as the fixed 4-piece of Tsuyama Atsushi, Higashi Hiroshi, Shimura Koji and Kawabata Makoto.

== Track listing ==
No.	Title	Lyrics	Music	Length
1.	"Che Gia Si Fa"	Tsuyama, Muroni	Kawabata, Tsuyama, Shimura	11:02
2.	"Douchebag: a) Tales of Mystery Zone; b) Sometime in Your Pussy; c) Lament of Alter Egos"	Odom; Odom; Muroni	Tsuyama; Kawabata; Kawabata	21:36
3.	"Traitors With Beautiful Hearts"	Tsuyama	Tsuyama, Kawabata	3:58
4.	"Astro Elvis E.S.P."	Odom	Kawabata	15:07
5.	"Santa Sanrodriguez"	Tsuyama, Nazrin	Kawabata	15:04
6.	"Johnny Johnny Jerusalem"	Tsuyama	Tsuyama	3:31

== Personnel ==
- Tsuyama Atsushi – monster bass, voice, acoustic guitar, piano, bamboo flute, cosmic joker
- Higashi Hiroshi – synthesizer, dancin'king
- Shimura Koji – drums, Latino cool
- Kawabata Makoto – electric guitar, hurdy-gurdy, bouzouki, electric sitar, sarangi, tambura, organ, harmonium, violin, electric tambura, glockenspiel, synthesizer, ring modulator, reyong, RDS900, voice, speed guru

=== Guests ===
- Stoo Odom – voice, king of beer
- Stefania Muroni – voice
- Nazrin – voice
