= Are We Experimental? =

Studio album by Acid Mothers Temple & The Melting Paraiso U.F.O.
- Released: June 2, 2009
- Recorded: February 2009
- Genres: Psychedelic rock, acid rock
- Label: Prophase Music
- Producer: Kawabata Makoto

Acid Mothers Temple & The Melting Paraiso U.F.O. chronology
Lord of the Underground: Vishnu and the Magic Elixir (2009)	Are We Experimental? (2009)	Dark Side of the Black Moon: What Planet Are We On? (2009)

Are We Experimental? is an album by Acid Mothers Temple & The Melting Paraiso U.F.O., released in 2009 by Prophase Music.

== Track listing ==
No.	Title	Writer(s)	Length
1.	"E.S.P. (Experimental Spooky Peace)"	Kawabata	4:25
2.	"4000000000000000 Love Hotel"	Kawabata	6:51
3.	"Daruma Clause In Opposition"	Atsushi, Kawabata	7:56
4.	"Wired Stinky Pussy Luver"	Atsushi, Kawabata	7:15
5.	"Hallelujah Mystic Garden"	Atsushi	1:31
6.	"Iyomange Of The Rising Sun"	Atsushi, Kawabata	5:03
7.	"Close Encounters Of The Electric Spirits"	Atsushi, Kawabata	2:44
8.	"Holy Rock N Roll Bible"	Atsushi, Kawabata	6:43
9.	"Goodbye Big Asshole Emmanuelle"	Kawabata	3:38
10.	"Ultimate Unhip Blues"	Atsushi, Kawabata	8:09
11.	"Are We Experimental?"	Atsushi	3:15

=== Vinyl edition ===
Side A
No.	Title	Writer(s)	Length
1.	"E.S.P. (Experimental Spooky Peace)"	Kawabata	4:25
2.	"4000000000000000 Love Hotel"	Kawabata	6:51
3.	"Daruma Clause In Opposition"	Atsushi, Kawabata	7:56

Side B
No.	Title	Writer(s)	Length
1.	"Wired Stinky Pussy Luver"	Atsushi, Kawabata	7:15
2.	"Goodbye Big Asshole Emmanuelle"	Kawabata	3:38
3.	"Iyomange Of The Rising Sun"	Atsushi, Kawabata	5:03
4.	"Close Encounters Of The Electric Spirits"	Atsushi, Kawabata	2:44

Side C
No.	Title	Writer(s)	Length
1.	"Take Up They Kaleidoscope"	Kawabata	20:09

Side D
No.	Title	Writer(s)	Length
1.	"Holy Rock N Roll Bible"	Atsushi, Kawabata	6:43
2.	"Hallelujah Mystic Garden"	Atsushi	1:31
3.	"Ultimate Unhip Blues"	Atsushi, Kawabata	8:09
4.	"Are We Experimental?"	Atsushi	3:15

== Personnel ==
- Tsuyama Atsushi - monster bass, voice, acoustic guitar, ukulele, flute, soprano recorder, cosmic joker
- Higashi Hiroshi - synthesizer, dancin'king
- Shimura Koji - drums, Latino cool
- Kawabata Makoto - electric guitar, guitar synthesizer, organ, sitar, electronics, tape, speed guru

=== Technical personnel ===
- Production - Kawabata Makoto
- Mastering - Yoshida Tatsuya
- Artwork - Kawabata Makoto
