= Univers Zen ou de zéro à zéro =

Studio album by Acid Mothers Temple & The Melting Paraiso U.F.O.
- Released: 2002
- Genre: Psychedelic rock, acid rock
- Label: Fractal Records
- Producer: Kawabata Makoto

Acid Mothers Temple & The Melting Paraiso U.F.O. chronology
41st Century Splendid Man (2002)	Univers Zen ou de zéro à zéro (2002)	Electric Heavyland (2002)

Professional ratings
Review scores
Source	Rating
AllMusic	4.5/5 stars
Pitchfork Media	(8.4/10)

Univers Zen ou de zéro à zéro is an album by Acid Mothers Temple & The Melting Paraiso U.F.O., released in 2002 by Fractal Records. It was released as both a single CD and as a 4LP set including all the outtakes from the recording session and the bonus album Live in Europe 2002, recorded at Dachstock Reitschule, Berne, Switzerland on November 22, 2002.

== CD Track listing ==
1. "Electric Love Machine" – 10:33
2. "Ange Mécanique de Saturne" ("Mechanical Angel of Saturn") – 10:31
3. "Blues pour Bible Noire" ("Blues for Bible Black") – 21:40
4. "Trinité Orphique" ("Orphic Trinity") – 2:31
5. "Soleil de Cristal et Lune d'Argent" ("Crystal Sun and Silver Moon") – 22:25
6. "God Bless AMT" – 3:42

== 4LP Track listing ==
Side A

1. "Electric Love Machine"
2. "Ange Mécanique de Saturne"

Side B

1. "Blues pour Bible Noire"

Side C

1. "Soleil de Cristal et Lune d'Argent"

Side D

1. "La Femme Qui a Été Vendue par le Monde" ("The Woman Who was Sold by the World")
2. "Trinité Orphique"

Side E

1. "Hell Cats of Outer Space 1"

Side F

1. "Hell Cats of Outer Space 2"
2. "God Bless AMT"

Side G

1. "Soleil de Cristal et Lune d'Argent (Live in Europe 2002)"

Side H

1. "Pink Lady Lemonade "You're So Magical" (Live in Europe 2002)"

== Credits ==
Credits, as stated on the Acid Mothers website:

- Kawabata Makoto - electric guitars, bouzouki, violin, tambura, speed guru
- Cotton Casino - vocals, synthesizer, beer & cigarette
- Tsuyama Atsushi - monster bass, vocals, acoustic guitar, cosmic joker
- Koizumi Hajime - drums, sleeping monk
- Higashi Hiroshi - synthesizer, dancin'king
- Magic Aum Gigi - Jews harp, erotic underground

Additional personnel

- Father Moo - mooooooooooooooooooo
- Hiroshi Nar - guitar solo on "Electric love machine" (left channel)
