= +1 Records =

- Parent company: +1 Music
- Founded: 2008
- Distributor(s): Empire Distribution
- Genre: Independent music, alternative music
- Country of origin: United States
- Location: New York, NY
- Official website: plus1records.com

+1 Records was founded in 2008 as a music management, publicity & marketing company. From 2014, +1 Records was distributed by Lyor Cohen's 300 Entertainment. In 2018, +1 Records partnered with Empire Distribution.

== Notable artists ==
- Anna of the North
- Anna Shoemaker
- BAYLI
- Ethel
- Geordie Kieffer
- Rejjie Snow
- Shelailai
- The Vices
- Tiana Major9
- Wet World
- Fieh
