= Acid Mothers Temple & the Melting Paraiso U.F.O. (album) =

Acid Mothers Temple & the Melting Paraiso U.F.O

Studio album by Acid Mothers Temple & The Melting Paraiso U.F.O.
- Released: 1997
- Recorded: Acid Mothers Temple, 1995–1997
- Genre: Psychedelic rock, acid rock
- Length: 52:59
- Label: P.S.F. Records
- Producer: Ikeezumi Hideo, Kawabata Makoto

Acid Mothers Temple & The Melting Paraiso U.F.O. chronology
Acid Mothers Temple & The Melting Paraiso U.F.O. 2 (1997)	Acid Mothers Temple & the Melting Paraiso U.F.O (1997)	Pataphisical Freak Out MU!! (1999)

Professional ratings
Review scores
Source	Rating
Allmusic	4/5 stars

Acid Mothers Temple & the Melting Paraiso U.F.O is an album by the artists of the same name, released in 1997 by P.S.F. Records.

The album was recorded at Acid Mothers Temple from 1995 to 1997.

== Track listing ==
1. "Acid Mothers Prayer"
2. "Speed Guru"
3. "From The Melting Paraiso U.F.O. I"
4. "The Top Head Pixies"
5. "Zen Feedbacker"
6. "Coloradoughnut"
7. "From The Melting Paraiso U.F.O. II"
8. "Amphetamine A Go Go"
9. "Pink Lady Lemonade"
10. "Satori LSD"
11. "Hawaiian Brownie"
12. "Acid Mothers Temple For All!"

The songs on the CD are not indexed as individual tracks, i.e. they are all parts of one 52:59 long track.

== Personnel ==
- Cotton Casino – voice, sitar, synthesizer
- Suhara Keizo – bass
- Koizumi Hajime – drums, percussion, soprano saxophone, monk
- Kawabata Makoto – guitars, synthesizers, sarangi, alto recorder, oriental clarinet, cosmic ring modulator, speed guru, producer, engineer, artwork

Additional personnel

- Higashi Hiroshi – guitar, synthesizer, effects, fishing rod
- Takahashi Atsuki – drums, penguin
- Suzuki Chisen – voice
- Mano Kazuhiko – tenor saxophone, bass clarinet, percussion
- Sakakibara Daiji – didgeridoo, earth spirit
- Yasuda Hisashi – piano, magic cane
- Johan Wellens – cosmic narration, freak power
- Yoko – violin, cheese cake
- Ichi – dog
- Jijiji – synthesizer
