= Ace Fu Records =

American independent record label

Ace Fu Records is an independent record label founded in 1998 by Eric Speck. It is located in Williamsburg, Brooklyn. The label went on indefinite hiatus in 2007.

== Roster ==
- Acid Mothers Temple
- Annuals
- An Albatross
- Aqui
- The Dears
- Devotchka
- Ex Models
- Illinois
- Kaiser Chiefs
- Man Man
- Michael Leviton
- Oneida
- Officer May
- Parts & Labor
- Pinback
- Priestess
- Runner and the Thermodynamics
- Secret Machines
- Tarot Bolero
- The Sucka MCs
- Ted Leo
- Tunng

== See also ==
- List of record labels
