= Acid Mothers Temple =

Japanese psychedelic rock band

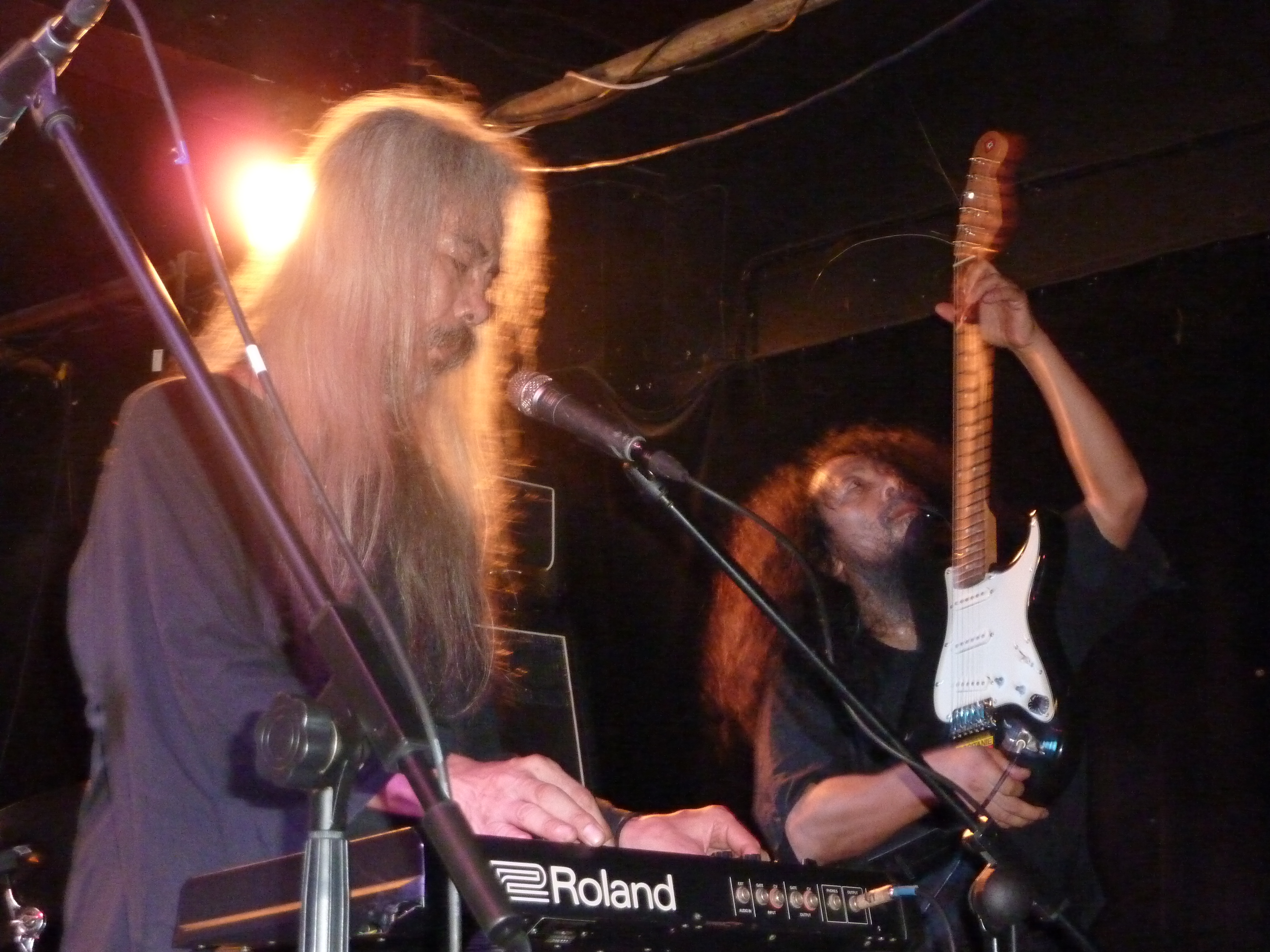
- Higashi Hiroshi and Kawabata Makoto on stage with Acid Mothers Temple at the Night & Day Cafe in Manchester 21 Oct 2012

Background information
- Also known as: (See members section)
- Origin: Japan
- Genres: Psychedelic rock; space rock
- Years active: 1995–present
- Label: Various
- Members: See list of members
- Website: acidmothers.com

Acid Mothers Temple & the Melting Paraiso U.F.O., commonly shortened to Acid Mothers Temple or AMT, is a Japanese rock band, the core of which formed in 1995. The band is led by guitarist Kawabata Makoto and early in their career featured many musicians and offshoot groups and collaborations, but by 2004 the line-up had coalesced with only a few core members and frequent guest vocalists.

The band has released albums frequently on a number of international record labels as well as the Acid Mothers Temple family record label, which was established in 1998 to document the activities of the whole collective.

== History ==
Kawabata initially formed Acid Mothers Temple (originally "Acid Mother's Temple") with the intention of creating "extreme trip music" by editing and dubbing previous recordings, being influenced by progressive rock, Karlheinz Stockhausen, and krautrock. Kawabata, along with Koizumi Hajime, Suhara Keizo, and Cotton Casino formed the original Acid Mother's Temple lineup as a group; however, the first recordings released were Kawabata's own mixes and overdubs. The soul collective released two self-titled tapes on their eponymous label in 1997 before dropping the apostrophe from their name. They soon released their first self-titled album (see Acid Mothers Temple & the Melting Paraiso U.F.O.). The group began to tour overseas in 1998.

The soul collective continued to tour and record, adding to the lineup drummer Ichiraku Yoshimitsu and guitarist Higashi Hiroshi. Several non-Acid Mothers shootoff bands formed, including Floating Flower, Nishinihon, and Tsurbami, while The Melting Paraiso U.F.O. played at sold-out shows and festivals all over North America, Japan, and Europe in the 2000s (decade). In 2002, the soul collective released four albums and two EPs in a three-month span while touring the United States, the United Kingdom, and Ireland, including South by Southwest in Austin, being selected as one of the top three groups performing.

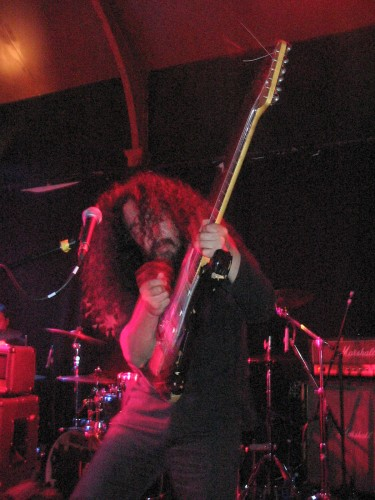
Kawabata Makoto on stage with Acid Mothers Temple in London in 2005

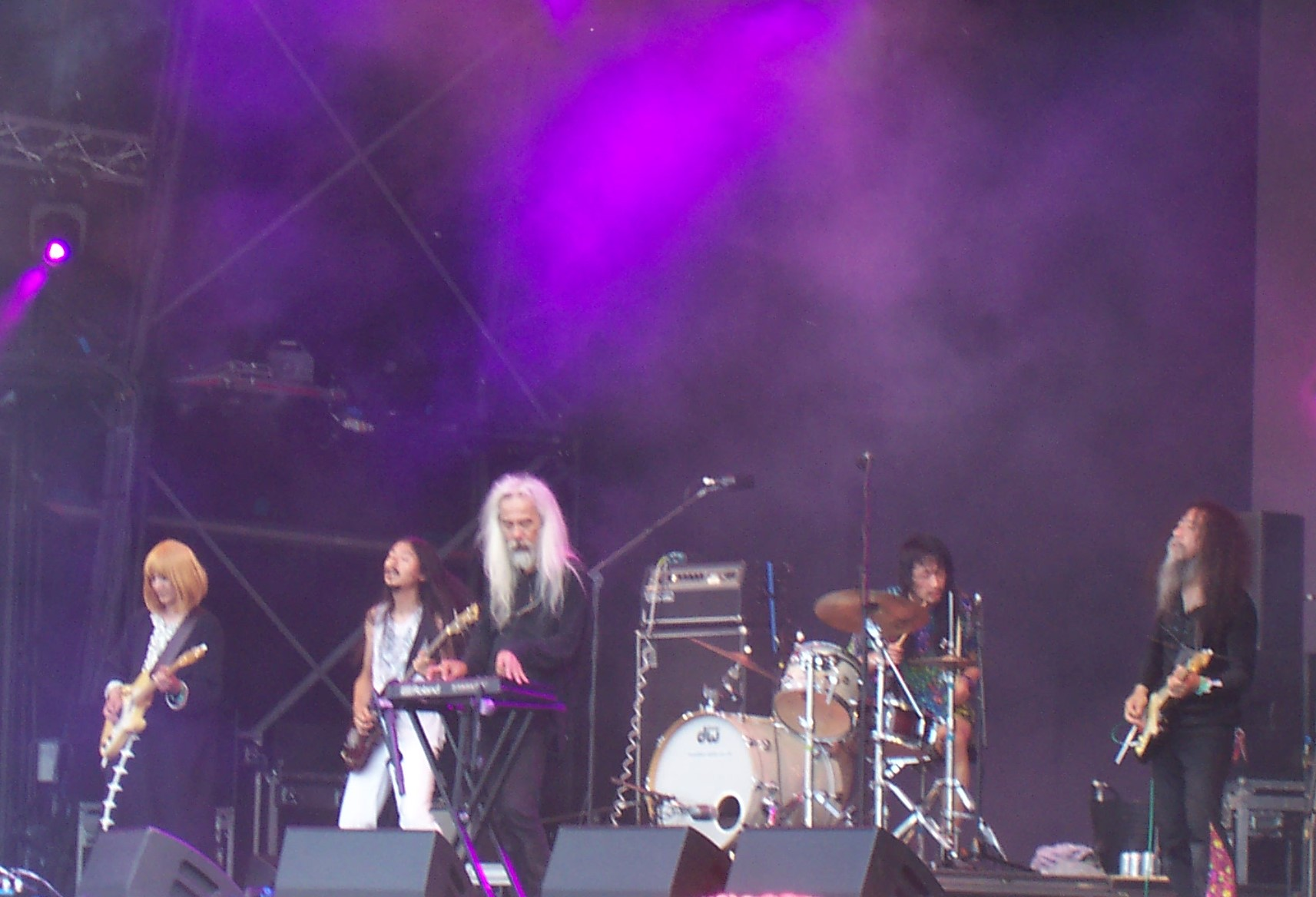
Acid Mothers Temple at Glastonbury Festival, 2019

Kawabata began his own solo offshoot, called Kawabata Makoto & the Mothers of Invasion, in an attempt to create music with a more jazz feel. In 2002, along with Tsuyama Atsushi and Ichiraku Yoshimitsu, the group released their only album under this name.

In 2003, an incarnation of the soul collective called "Acid Mothers Temple mode HHH" was formed to tour Europe, consisting of Kawabata, Tsuyama, and Yoshida, a group who had played together as Seikazoku long before Acid Mothers Temple was formed. The same year, a collaboration of Acid Mothers Temple and Gong called "Acid Mothers Gong" performed at the Royal Festival Hall in London.

Soon after, in 2004, long-time vocalist and synthesizer player Cotton Casino left the group to concentrate on her own group and family while Acid Mothers Gong continued to tour. The group again released four albums in a three-month period, while another collaboration between Acid Mothers Temple and Afrirampo, Acid Mothers Afrirampo, released an album as well. Meanwhile, Acid Mothers Temple mode HHH renamed itself to Acid Mothers Temple SWR and released its own album.

In 2005, to commemorate the tenth anniversary of Acid Mothers Temple, a new group called Acid Mothers Temple & the Cosmic Inferno was formed, starting their first European tour in June, and consisting of Kawabata, Higashi Hiroshi, Tabata Mitsuru, Okano Futoshi, and Shimura Koji and releasing several albums. Acid Mothers Temple SWR continued to tour as well. Acid Mothers Temple & the Incredible Strange Band was formed in 2006 by Tsuyama Akiko, Suhara Keizo, Aiko, Tsuyama Atsushi, and Kawabata Makoto. Kitagawa Hao joined The Cosmic Inferno as vocalist, though she left the soul collective after touring the United States in mid-2007. Tsuyama and Kawabata formed another offshoot in December 2006, Acid Gurus Temple, with Mani Neumeier of Guru Guru, which quickly changed its name to Acid Mothers Guru Guru.

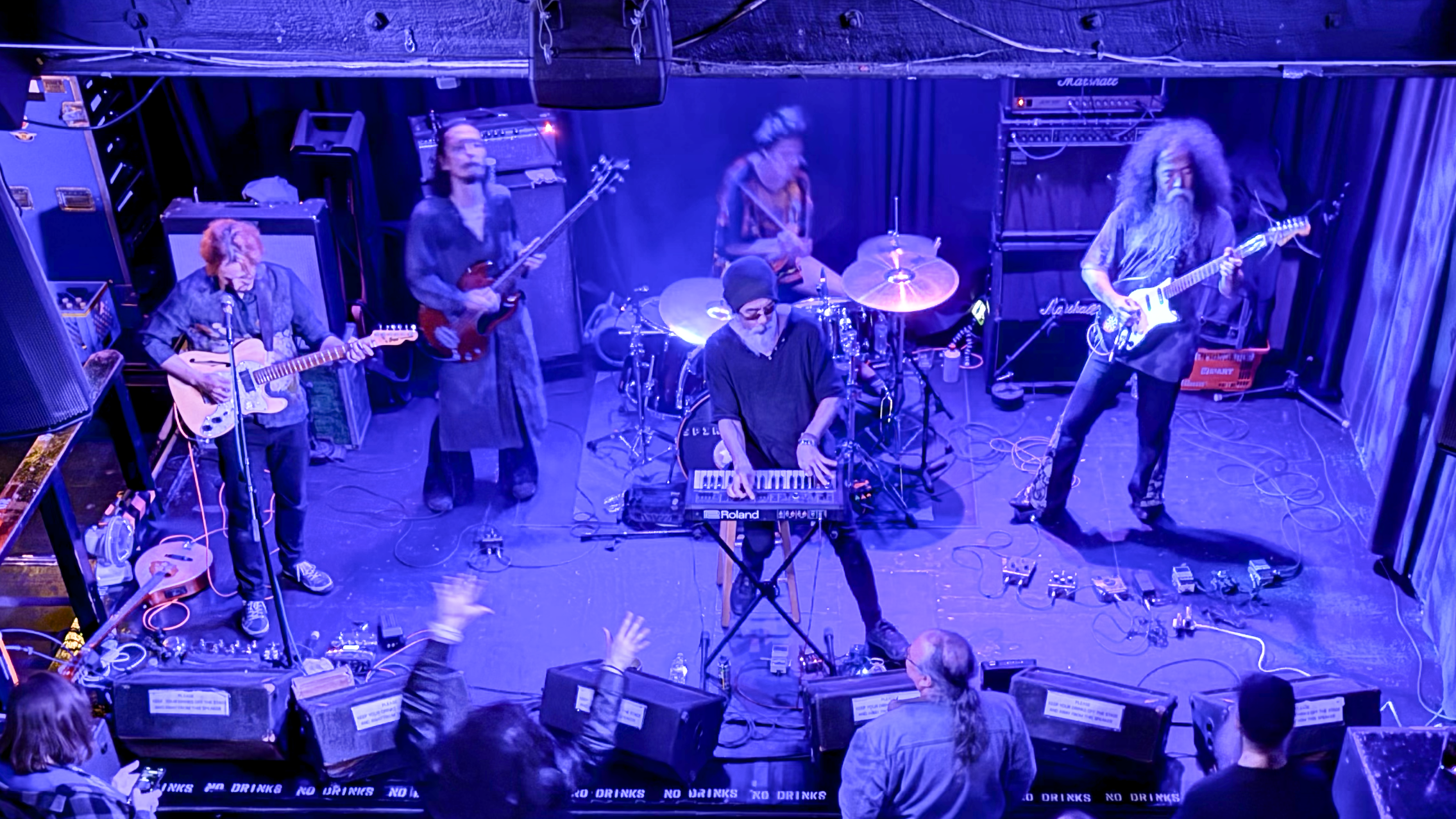
Acid Mothers Temple at the Pour House, Raleigh NC in October 2024

The soul collective has also hosted its own yearly festival in Japan, appropriately titled Acid Mothers Festival, since 2002, which has been attended by Yamazaki Maso of Masonna, Afrirampo, Yoshida Tatsuya, Mani Neumeier, Kuriyama Jun, Ohpia, and Seiichi Yamamoto of Boredoms.

During their first Southamerican Tour in 2017 Acid Mothers Temple & the Melting Paraiso U.F.O. met Argentine cult band Reynols. In Buenos Aires both groups went to a Studio to record together. In 2020 the album ACID MOTHERS REYNOLS "Vol.1" was released as LP by French label La Belle Brute and the same year the film "Acid Mothers Reynols: Live and Beyond" was presented documenting this historic meeting.

Acid Mothers Temple & the Melting Paraiso U.F.O. traditionally tour Canada and the United States in the spring of every year, on a grueling schedule with very few days off, and continued this through 2019. Somewhat less frequently, they tour Europe in the autumn.

With regards to the often-confusing array of names for the different bands, Kawabata has explained:

Though we shall henceforth be Acid Mothers Temple & the Cosmic Inferno, the new group will also be known in short as Acid Mothers Temple and this will no doubt sow confusion in the minds of many. But the true manifestations of Acid Mothers Temple are many—Acid Mothers Temple & the Melting Paraiso U.F.O., Acid Mothers Temple & the Cosmic Inferno, Acid Mothers Temple SWR. The future may see yet other groups bearing similar names. But each and all of them will be true manifestations of Acid Mothers Temple.

— Kawabata Makoto

One reviewer said of Acid Mothers Temple & the Melting Paraiso U.F.O. concerts:

In a non-stop stream of thrilling noise, they segue from supercharged stomp-rock, through doomy choral chanting and frazzled go-go, to a thundering melee of atonal freakouts. Then on to a pulsating, echo-drenched disco-rock groove, which morphs into a motorik rhythm too rapid even for the autobahn, works itself into a squalling frenzy, breaks cover as a kind of galloping, syncopated, Underworld-with-rabies affair, and flows into a long, chiming trance number climaxing in a collective instrumental howl.

— David Bennun
