= Shizuka discography =

- Studio albums: 1
- Live albums: 4
- Video albums: 2
- Compact cassettes: 4
- Compilations (misc. appearances): 6
- Videos (misc. appearances): 3

The discography of Shizuka, a rock band from Tokyo, Japan, consists of one studio album, three live albums, two live video albums, and four compact cassettes. Shizuka's discography also includes appearances in six compilation albums of various artists, and miscellaneous appearances in at least three video footages.

== Albums ==
=== Studio albums ===
Date	Title	Album details	Ref.
1994-09-22	Heavenly Persona (天界のペルソナ, Tenkai no Perusona)	Label: PSF Records; Cat. No: PSFD-52; Formats: CD	

=== Live albums ===
Date	Title	Album details	Ref.
1995	Live Shizuka	Label: Persona Non Grata; Cat. No: PNG-1; Formats: CD	
2000	Tokyo Underground 20, Jul ’95	Label: Last Visible Dog; Cat. No: LVD030; Formats: CD-R	
2008-04-25	Traditional Aesthetics (伝承美学, Denshou Bigaku)	Label: PSF Records; Cat. No: PSFD-178; Formats: CD	
2021-06-28	Paradise of Delusion (妄想の楽園, Mousou no Rakuen)	Label: An'archives; Cat. No: AN18; Formats: Vinyl	

=== Video albums ===
Date	Title	Album details	Ref.
1995	Shizuka (静香)	Label: [no label]; Cat. No: [none]; Formats: VHS	
2009–12	Hikyoku no Seiseki: Live at Manda-La2 1993 & Studio Ams 1994 (秘曲の成績)	Label: Fra, Inc.; Cat. No: FRSD0903; Formats: DVD-Video, Remastered	
2010-04-25	Endless Dream (終わりのない夢, Owari no Nai Yume)	Label: PSF Records; Cat. No: PSFDV-1004; Formats: DVD-Video, NTSC	

== Compact cassettes ==
Date	Title	Details
1992	Shizuka (静香)	Label: [no label] (Shizuka self-release); Cat. No: [none]; Formats: Cassette, C54
—	Shizuka II (静香 II)	Label: [no label] (Shizuka self-release); Cat. No: [none]; Formats: Cassette, C54
1993-04-10	Shizuka III (静香 III)	Label: [no label] (Shizuka self-release); Cat. No: [none]; Formats: Cassette, single sided, C46
—	No. 4	Label: [no label] (Shizuka self-release); Cat. No: [none]; Formats: Cassette, C60

== Miscellaneous appearances ==
=== Compilations ===
Date	Album	Track	Details
1993–09	Tokyo Flashback 3	ほどかれた娥羅子のリボン	Label: PSF Records; Cat. No: PSFD-34; Formats: CD
1995	Tokyo Flashback 4	世に残す歌	Label: PSF Records; Cat. No: PSFD-69; Formats: CD
1996-07-15	Tokyo Invasion! Volume 1: Cosmic Kurushi Monsters	Blood Stained Blossom	Label: Virgin; Cat. No: TOKYO1; Formats: 2×CD
1997-04-22	Land of the Rising Noise: Volume 2	Kimi no Sora	Label: Charnel Music; Cat. No: CHCD-23; Formats: CD
2009	Do the Independence and Bridge Build Burn by Yourself.	きざし	Label: Bridge Build Burn Corporation; Cat. No: GoTo-0000; Formats: DVD-Audio
2017-05-24	Tokyo Flashback: P.S.F. — Psychedelic Speed Freaks	気の真珠	Label: Super Fuji Discs; Cat. No: FJSP271/272; Formats: 2×CD

=== Videos ===
Date	Title	Details
1995–06	Alkaloid Serenade (アルカロイド小夜曲, Arukaroido Shouyakyoku)	Author or copyright owner: [unknown]; Original publication: [unknown]; Immediate source: internet video
2001-06-10	Live at Heaven's Door	Author or copyright owner: "seat"; "ethereal"; Original publication: Rocker magazine (Taiwan); Immediate source: YouTube video
2005-03-17	Live at UFO Club	Author or copyright owner: [unknown]; Original publication: [unknown]; Immediate source: YouTube videos

== See also ==
- Shizuka Miura
