= Live (High Rise album) =

1994 album

Live album by High Rise
- Released: October 25, 1994
- Genre: Noise rock, psychedelic rock
- Length: 47:13
- Label: P.S.F.
- Producer: Asahito Nanjo

High Rise chronology
Dispersion (1992)	Live (1994)	Disallow (1996)

Professional ratings
Review scores
Source	Rating
Allmusic	4/5 stars

Live is a live album by High Rise, released on October 25, 1994 through P.S.F. Records.

== Track listing ==
All lyrics are written by Asahito Nanjo; all music is composed by High Rise

No.	Title	Length
1.	"Sadame"	4:34
2.	"Ikon"	5:01
3.	"Mira"	7:57
4.	"Outside Gentiles"	5:52
5.	"Door"	8:24
6.	"Mainliner"	4:56
7.	"Pop Sicle"	10:29

== Personnel ==
- Asahito Nanjo – vocals, bass guitar, production
- Munehiro Narita – guitar, cover art
- Yuro Ujiie – drums
