= Mainliner Sonic =

Studio album by Mainliner
- Released: May 20, 1997
- Recorded: 1997
- Studio: West Studio (Tokyo, JP)
- Genre: Noise rock, psychedelic rock
- Length: 30:52
- Label: Charnel Music
- Producer: Asahito Nanjo

Mainliner chronology
Mellow Out (1996)	Mainliner Sonic (1997)	Psychedelic Polyhedron (1997)

Professional ratings
Review scores
Source	Rating
Allmusic	4/5 stars

Mainliner Sonic is the third studio album by Mainliner, released on May 20, 1997 by Charnel Music.

== Track listing ==
All lyrics are written by Asahito Nanjo; all music is composed by Kawabata Makoto and Asahito Nanjo

No.	Title	Length
1.	"Mainliner Sonic"	6:54
2.	"Tsukisasaru"	5:40
3.	"Last Day"	5:34
4.	"Blue Pieces"	6:38
5.	"Mainliner Sonic II"	6:06

== Personnel ==
Adapted from the Mainliner Sonic liner notes.

- Kawabata Makoto – electric guitar
- Asahito Nanjo – vocals, bass guitar, production
- Tatsuya Yoshida – drums

== Release history ==
Region	Date	Label	Format	Catalog
United States	1997	Charnel Music	CD	CHCD-25
