= Ishizuka =

Ishizuka (written: 石塚 in Kanji or いしづか in Hiragana, lit. "stone mound") is a Japanese surname. Notable people with the surname include:

- Akari Ishizuka (石塚 朱莉, born 1997), Japanese actress and singer
- Atsuko Ishizuka (いしづか あつこ, born 1981), Japanese anime director
- Ishizuka Eizō (石塚 英蔵, 1866–1942), Japanese politician
- Karen L. Ishizuka, American writer
- Katashi Ishizuka (石塚 堅, born 1970), Japanese voice actor
- Keiji Ishizuka (石塚 啓次, born 1974), Japanese footballer
- Masaya Ishizuka (石塚 将也), Japanese karateka
- Naru Ishizuka, Japanese musician
- Rie Ishizuka (石塚 理恵, born 1964), Japanese voice actress
- Sagen Ishizuka (石塚 左玄, 1850–1909), Japanese physician
- Sayori Ishizuka (石塚 さより, born 1977), Japanese voice actress
- Shinichi Ishizuka (石塚 真一, born 1971), Japanese manga artist
- Tamaki Ishizuka (石塚 瑶季, born 2004), Japanese musician
- Tomoaki Ishizuka (石塚 智昭, born 1965), Japanese musician
- Tomoji Ishizuka (石塚 友次, 1906–1984), Japanese poet and writer
- Toshiaki Ishizuka (石塚 俊明, born 1950), Japanese musician
- Unshō Ishizuka (石塚 運昇, 1951–2018), Japanese voice actor
