= Imaginative Plain =

Studio album by Mainliner
- Released: April 25, 2001
- Recorded: October 2000
- Studio: KS Studio (Bottrop, DE)
- Genre: Noise rock, psychedelic rock
- Length: 46:55
- Label: P.S.F.
- Producer: Asahito Nanjo

Mainliner chronology
| Psychedelic Polyhedron (1997) | Imaginative Plain (2001) | Revelation Space (2013) |

Imaginative Plain is the fourth studio album by Mainliner, released on April 25, 2001 by P.S.F. Records.

== Reception ==
Professional ratings
Review scores
| Source | Rating |
|---|---|
| Tiny Mix Tapes | 4.5/5 stars |

In writing for the Chicago Tribune, Kevin M. Williams noted that the music sounded as if "The Stooges were jamming with the MC5, with a guest appearance from Jimi Hendrix, and they've lost the set list, so they're just rocking out" and that "Kawabata makes a strong case for a slot in the shredder hall of fame, laying down sheets of precise, note-rich frenzy from his severely overdriven guitar." In a retrospective review, Tiny Mix Tapes awarded the album four-and-a-half out of five stars, saying "until experiencing Mainliner's Imaginative Plain, I’d never heard an album compressed within an inch of collapsing into a black hole, so dense that only pure distortion could escape."

== Track listing ==
All tracks are written by Asahito Nanjo

| No. | Title | Length |
|---|---|---|
| 1. | "Imaginative Plain" | 4:23 |
| 2. | "Soft Line" | 7:45 |
| 3. | "Static" | 4:44 |
| 4. | "Ride Blue" | 16:43 |
| 5. | "Attack" | 3:20 |

== Personnel ==
Adapted from the Imaginative Plain liner notes.

Mainliner

- Kawabata Makoto – electric guitar
- Asahito Nanjo – vocals, bass guitar, production
- Koji Shimura – drums

Production and additional personnel

- Bucci & D.I.O – cover art
- Jerome Genin – front cover photo
- Mainliner – arrangements

== Release history ==
| Region | Date | Label | Format | Catalog |
|---|---|---|---|---|
| Japan | 2001 | P.S.F. | CD | PSFD-125 |
