= Psychedelic Polyhedron =

Studio album by Mainliner
- Released: April 1997
- Recorded: December 1996 at Studio K7, Tokyo, Japan
- Genre: Noise rock, psychedelic rock
- Length: 38:30
- Label: Fractal
- Producer: Asahito Nanjo

Mainliner chronology
Mainliner Sonic (1997)	Psychedelic Polyhedron (1997)	Imaginative Plain (2001)

Professional ratings
Review scores
Source	Rating
Allmusic	4/5 stars

Psychedelic Polyhedron is the second album by Mainliner, released in April 1997 by Fractal Records.

== Track listing ==
All lyrics are written by Asahito Nanjo; all music is composed by Mainliner

Side one
No.	Title	Length
1.	"Show the Cloven Hoof"	19:20

Side two
No.	Title	Length
1.	"Cardinal Virtues"	19:10

== Personnel ==
- Jérôme Genin – cover art
- Kawabata Makoto – guitar
- Asahito Nanjo – vocals, bass guitar, production
- Tatsuya Yoshida – drums
