= Psychedelic Speed Freaks =

Live album by High Rise
- Released: 1984
- Genre: Noise rock, psychedelic rock
- Length: 26:01
- Label: P.S.F.

High Rise chronology
Psychedelic Speed Freaks (1984)	II (1986)

Psychedelic Speed Freaks is a live album by High Rise, released in 1984 through P.S.F. Records.

== Track listing ==
All tracks are written by High Rise.

Side one
No.	Title	Length
1.	"Induced Depression"	3:56
2.	"P.S.F."	5:37
3.	"Stone Addict"	4:56

Side two
No.	Title	Length
1.	"Take a Trip"	11:33

== Personnel ==
- Asahito Nanjo – vocals, bass guitar
- Munehiro Narita – guitar
- Shimizu – drums on "Stone Addict"
- Ikuro Takahashi – drums
