= Disallow =

Studio album by High Rise
- Released: May 25, 1996
- Genres: Noise rock, psychedelic rock
- Length: 34:05
- Label: P.S.F.
- Producer: High Rise

High Rise chronology
| Live (1994) | Disallow (1996) | Desperado (1998) |

Professional ratings
Review scores
| Source | Rating |
|---|---|
| Allmusic | 4/5 stars |

Disallow is the third album by High Rise, released on May 25, 1996, through P.S.F. Records.

== Track listing ==
All lyrics are written by Asahito Nanjo; all music is composed by High Rise.

| No. | Title | Length |
|---|---|---|
| 1. | "Allow" | 6:02 |
| 2. | "Whirl" | 6:49 |
| 3. | "Madame" |
| 4. | "Ikon" | 7:04 |
| 5. | "Grab" | 8:44 |

== Personnel ==
High Rise

- Asahito Nanjo – vocals, bass guitar, engineering
- Munehiro Narita – guitar
- Pill – drums

Production and additional personnel

- Space Grotesque – cover art
- High Rise – production
