= II (High Rise album) =

Studio album by High Rise
- Released: 1986
- Genre: Noise rock, psychedelic rock
- Length: 38:52
- Label: P.S.F.

High Rise chronology
Psychedelic Speed Freaks (1984)	II (1986)	Dispersion (1992)

Alternative cover
- 2018 Black Editions re-release

Professional ratings
Review scores
Source	Rating
Allmusic	4/5 stars
Pitchfork	8.4/10

II is the debut album of High Rise, released in 1986 through P.S.F. Records. A remastered version by Asahito Nanjo was released on February 9, 2018 through Black Editions.

== Track listing ==
All tracks are written by High Rise

No.	Title	Length
1.	"Cycle Goddess"	0:54
2.	"Turn You Cry"	3:06
3.	"Cotton Top"	4:19
4.	"Last Rites"	2:49
5.	"Wipe Out"	5:13
6.	"Pop Sicle"	13:10
7.	"Monster a Go Go"	5:23
8.	"Induced Depression"	3:59

== Personnel ==
High Rise

- Asahito Nanjo – vocals, bass guitar
- Munehiro Narita – guitar
- Yuro Ujiie – drums

Production and additional personnel

- Kazu Hama – mixing, recording
- Kenji Nakazawa – recording
