= Dispersion (album) =

Studio album by High Rise
- Released: December 25, 1992
- Genres: Noise rock, psychedelic rock
- Length: 59:17
- Label: P.S.F.
- Producer: High Rise

High Rise chronology
II (1986)	Dispersion (1992)	Live (1994)

Professional ratings
Review scores
Source	Rating
Allmusic	4/5 stars

Dispersion is the second album by High Rise, released on December 25, 1992 through P.S.F. Records.

== Track listing ==
All lyrics are written by Asahito Nanjo; all music is composed by High Rise.

No.	Title	Length
1.	"Outside Gentiles"	5:15
2.	"Nuit"	3:57
3.	"Sadducees Faith"	15:01
4.	"Sanctuary"	4:27
5.	"Eucharist"	7:04
6.	"Mainliner"	10:26
7.	"Deuteronomy"	13:07

== Personnel ==
High Rise

- Asahito Nanjo – vocals, bass guitar
- Munehiro Narita – guitar, cover art
- Yuro Ujiie – drums

Production and additional personnel

- High Rise – production
- Yuichi Jibiki – photography
- Kenji Nakazawa – engineering, mixing
- Takewo Yamamoto – engineering
