= Mellow Out =

Studio album by Mainliner
- Released: 1996
- Recorded: 1995
- Studio: La Musica Studio (Tokyo, JP)
- Genre: Noise rock, psychedelic rock
- Length: 35:45
- Label: Charnel Music
- Producer: Asahito Nanjo

Mainliner chronology
Mellow Out (1996)	Mainliner Sonic (1997)

Professional ratings
Review scores
Source	Rating
Allmusic	4/5 stars
Alternative Press	4/5 stars

Mellow Out is the debut studio album of Mainliner, released in 1996 through Charnel Music.

== Track listing ==
All lyrics are written by Asahito Nanjo; all music is composed by Kawabata Makoto and Asahito Nanjo

No.	Title	Length
1.	"Cockamamie"	1:51
2.	"Black Sky"	15:17
3.	"M."	18:37

== Personnel ==
Adapted from the Mellow Out liner notes.

- Kawabata Makoto – electric guitar
- Hajime Koizumi – drums
- Asahito Nanjo – vocals, bass guitar, production

== Release history ==
Region	Date	Label	Format	Catalog
United States	1996	Charnel Music	CD	CHCD-19
United Kingdom	2003	Riot Season	CD, LP	REPOSE 01
United Kingdom	2013	Riot Season	LP	REPOSE 038
