= Aoi Bungaku =

Anime television series

- Aoi Bungaku Series
- First Blu-ray volume cover, for the No Longer Human story

青い文学シリーズ
- Anime television series
- Directed by: Morio Asaka (#1–4); Tetsurō Araki (#5–6); Shigeyuki Miya (#7–8); Ryosuke Nakamura (#9–10); Atsuko Ishizuka (#11–12)
- Written by: Satoshi Suzuki (#1–4); Ken Iizuka (#5–6); Mika Abe (#7–8); Sumino Kawashima (#9–10); Atsuko Ishizuka (#11); Yūji Kobayashi (#12)
- Music by: Hideki Taniuchi (#1–8, 11–12); Shusei Murai (#9–10)
- Studio: Madhouse
- Original network: Nippon TV
- Original run: October 11, 2009 – December 27, 2009
- Episodes: 12

Aoi Bungaku Series (青い文学シリーズ; "Blue Literature Series") is a twelve episode Japanese anime series featuring adaptations inspired by six short stories from Japanese literature. The six stories are adapted from classic Japanese tales. Happinet, Hakuhodo DY Media Partners, McRAY, MTI, Threelight Holdings, Movic, and Visionare were involved in the production of the series. Character designs were provided by manga artists Takeshi Obata (#1–4, 7–8), Tite Kubo (#5–6, 11, 12) and Takeshi Konomi (#9–10). Sakai Masato serves as narrator as well as a voice actor in the series. The series was released in 2009.

== Stories adapted ==
=== No Longer Human ===
Adaptation of Osamu Dazai's No Longer Human

- Chapter 1: Double Suicide in Kamakura
- Chapter 2: Ghost
- Chapter 3: Society
- Chapter 4: New World

Plot

A high schooler is overwhelmed by a deep sense of alienation, making him fall into years of drug use and self-harm.

Direction and crew

Info

- Kojiro Tsuruoka (Director)
- Morio Asaka (Director, Storyboard)
- Satoshi Suzuki (Writer)
- Takeshi Obata (Animation)
- Takahiko Abiru (Animation)
- Go Gyeong-nam (Animation Director)

Voice Cast

Info

- Aya Hisakawa as Shizuko
- Ai Horanai as Waitress (ep 1), Children (ep 2)
- Atsuko Tanaka as Madam
- Wataru Takagi as Horiki
- Yasushi Miyabayashi as Master
- Mamiko Noto as Yoshiko
- Romi Park as Tsuneko
- Masato Sakai as Ōba Yōzō
- Miho Miyagawa Pharmacy Owner, Housewife 3 (ep 3)

=== In the Forest, Under Cherries in Full Bloom ===
Adaptation of In the Forest, Under Cherries in Full Bloom, by Ango Sakaguchi (episodes 5–6)

- Chapter 1
- Chapter 2

Plot

A forest bandit finds a beautiful maiden in the forest and takes her to be his wife, but she is more than she seems to be.

Direction and crew

Info

- Tetsuro Araki (Director/Animation, Storyboard)
- Miho Hirao (Director)
- Tite Kubo (Animation)
- Kunio Katsuki (Animation Supervision)
- Shinichi Miyamae (Animation Director)
- Ken Iizuka (Writer)

Voice Cast

Info

- Masato Sakai as Shirimaru
- Nana Mizuki as Akiko
- Taeko Kawata as Chiyo
- Ai Horanai as Wife B
- Asami Yaguchi as Wife F
- Kiyoko Nagaki as Wife D
- Kiyoyuki Yanada as Boar
- Yui Kano as Wife A
- Yuki Kaida as Wife E
- Miho Miyagawa as Wife C

=== Kokoro ===
Adaptation of Natsume Sōseki's Kokoro (episodes 7–8)

- Chapter 1
- Chapter 2

Plot

A young man lives in Tokyo as a renter with a widow and her daughter. He invites his childhood friend to come live with him, hoping to help him out of his depression. When his friend falls in love with the widow's daughter, it drives a rift between them. The story is narrated twice from different points of view.

Direction and crew

- Shigeyuki Miya (Director)
- Mika Abe (Writer)
- Takeshi Obata (Animation)

Voice Cast

Info

- Masato Sakai as Sensei
- Rikiya Koyama as K
- Houko Kuwashima as Ojousan
- Showko Tsuda as Widow

=== Run, Melos! ===
Adaptation of Run, Melos!, by Osamu Dazai (episode 9–10)

- Chapter 1
- Chapter 2

Plot

A playwright writes a play based on the story "Run, Melos!", and deals with his own feelings of betrayal towards his childhood friend.

Direction and crew

- Takeshi Konomi (Animation)

Voice Cast

Info

- Hidenobu Kiuchi as Takada
- Masato Sakai as Moerus (Melos)
- Ryusei Nakao as Dionysius
- Tomokazu Seki as Joshima
- Hiroyuki Yoshino as Serinentius
- Mikako Takahashi as Melos' sister

=== The Spider's Thread ===
Adaptation of The Spider's Thread, by Ryūnosuke Akutagawa (episode 11)

Plot

Kandata, a cruel and evil bandit, is executed and lands in hell. The one good thing he had done in his life was to not kill a spider he met in the city. The spider drops him a thread to climb up into heaven. His elation is short-lived, however, as he realizes that others have started climbing the thread behind him.

Direction and crew

Info

- Tite Kubo (Animation)

Voice Cast

Info

- Masato Sakai as Ryoushuu, Sensei
- Daisuke Namikawa as King
- Mamoru Miyano as Kan (Ushiheniken)
- Kenji Nomura as Big Man

=== Hell Screen ===
Adaptation of Hell Screen, by Ryūnosuke Akutagawa (episode 12)

Plot

Yoshihide, the greatest painter in the country, is commissioned to draw his greatest work, an image of the king's country inside his mausoleum. In the despotic king's realm, Yoshihide can see nothing but the suffering of the commoners. He decides to make his last work a tribute to the country as it really is.

Direction and crew

Info

- Tite Kubo (Animation)
- Yoshinori Kanemori (Animation Director)
- Yuji Kobayashi (Writer)
- Atsuko Ishizuka (Writer)

Voice Cast

Info

- Masato Sakai as Ryoushuu, Sensei
- Daisuke Namikawa as King
- Aya Endo as Mitsuki

== Reception ==
Emmanuel Bahu-Leyser from the French Animeland found it exceptional to have such realistic, deep and mature stories adapted into anime. He went further by describing the series as a gold nugget both culturally and technically. On the negative side, he noted that the adaptation quality is uneven between the teams.
