= Endless Dream =

Endless Dream may refer to:

== Albums ==
- Endless Dream, a 1992 album by Vivian Chow
- Endless Dream, a 1988 album by BZN
- Endless Dream, a 2010 album by Shizuka
- Endless Dream, a 2020 album by Peter Bjorn and John

== Songs ==
- "Endless Dream", a song by God Is an Astronaut, from the album A Moment of Stillness
- "Endless Dream", a song by Yes, from the album Talk
