= Toshiaki =

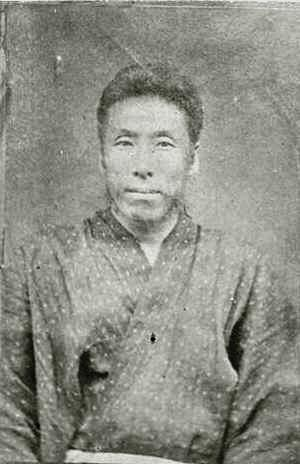
- Toshiaki Kirino (1838–1877), Japanese samurai and general
- Pronunciation: toɕiakʲi (IPA)
- Gender: Male

Origin
- Origin: Japanese
- Meaning: Different meanings depending on the kanji used

Other names
- Alternative spelling: Tosiaki (Kunrei-shiki) Tosiaki (Nihon-shiki) Toshiaki (Hepburn)

Toshiaki is a masculine Japanese given name.

== Written forms ==
Toshiaki can be written using many different combinations of kanji characters. Some examples:

- 敏明, "agile, bright"
- 敏朗, "agile, clear"
- 敏晃, "agile, clear"
- 敏章, "agile, chapter"
- 敏亮, "agile, clear"
- 敏昭, "agile, clear"
- 俊明, "talented, bright"
- 俊朗, "talented, clear"
- 俊晃, "talented, clear"
- 俊章, "talented, chapter"
- 俊亮, "talented, clear"
- 俊昭, "talented, clear"
- 利明, "benefit, bright"
- 利朗, "benefit, clear"
- 利晃, "benefit, clear"
- 利章, "benefit, crystal"
- 年明, "year, bright"
- 年晶, "year, sparkle"
- 寿明, "long life, bright"
- 寿旭, "long life, rising sun"

The name can also be written in hiragana としあき or katakana トシアキ.

== Notable people with the name ==
- Toshiaki Araki (荒木 敏明; born 1942), Japanese fencer
- Toshiaki Endo (遠藤 利明; born 1950), Japanese politician
- Toshiaki Fukuda (福田 敏昭; born 1980), Japanese field hockey player
- Toshiaki Fushimi (伏見 俊昭; born 1976), Japanese cyclist
- Toshiaki Haji (羽地 登志晃; born 1978), Japanese footballer
- Toshiaki Hirose (廣瀬 俊明; born 1981), Japanese rugby union player
- Toshiaki Honda (本多 利明; 1744–1821), Japanese mathematician
- Toshiaki Imae (今江 敏晃; born 1983), Japanese baseball player
- Toshiaki Imai (今井 敏明; born 1954), Japanese footballer and manager
- Toshiaki Inoue (井上 敏明; born 1951), Japanese triple jumper
- Toshiaki Ishizuka (石塚 俊明; born 1950), Japanese musician
- Toshiaki Iwashiro (岩代 俊明; born 1977), Japanese manga artist
- Toshiaki Ishizuka (石塚 俊明; born 1950), Japanese musician
- Toshiaki Kamata (鎌田 俊明; born 1951), Japanese long-distance runner
- Toshiaki Karasawa (唐沢 寿明; born 1963), Japanese actor
- Toshiaki Kasuga (春日 俊彰; born 1979), Japanese comedian
- Toshiaki Kawada (川田 利明; born 1963), Japanese professional wrestler
- Toshiaki Kirino (桐野 利秋; 1838–1877), Japanese samurai and general
- Toshiaki Kosedo (小瀬戸 俊昭; born 1941), Japanese volleyball player
- Toshiaki Kubo (久保 利明; born 1975), Japanese shogi player
- Toshiaki Kurasawa (倉澤 利彰; born 1976), Japanese swimmer
- Toshiaki Maruyama (丸山 寿明; born 1959), Japanese Nordic combined skier
- Toshiaki Mori (森 気楼; born 1962), aka Shinkiro, Japanese illustrator and conceptual artist
- Toshiaki Nishioka (西岡 利晃; born 1976), Japanese boxer
- Toshiaki Odate (小達 敏昭; born 1968), Japanese golfer
- Toshiaki Tanaka (田中 利明; 1935–1998), Japanese table tennis player
- Toshiaki Toyozakura (豊桜 俊昭; born 1974), real name Toshiaki Muko (向 俊昭), Japanese sumo wrestler
- Toshiaki Toyoda (豊田 利晃; born 1969), Japanese film director and screenwriter
