= Desperado (High Rise album) =

Studio album by High Rise
- Released: July 10, 1998
- Recorded: 1998 at West Studio, Tokyo, Japan
- Genres: Noise rock, psychedelic rock
- Length: 34:57
- Label: P.S.F.
- Producer: High Rise

High Rise chronology
Disallow (1996)	Desperado (1998)	Destination (2002)

Professional ratings
Review scores
Source	Rating
Allmusic	3/5 stars

Desperado is the fourth album by High Rise, released on July 10, 1998 through P.S.F. Records.

== Track listing ==
All lyrics are written by Asahito Nanjo; all music is composed by High Rise.

No.	Title	Length
1.	"Git"	0:54
2.	"Desperado"	2:42
3.	"Right On"	12:04
4.	"Flam"	6:15
5.	"Effing"	5:04
6.	"Mind Bending"	0:45
7.	"Skive"	7:11
Total length:		34:57

== Personnel ==
High Rise

- Shoji Hano – drums
- Asahito Nanjo – vocals, bass guitar, recording
- Munehiro Narita – guitar

Production and additional personnel

- High Rise – production
