= Mainliner (band) =

Japanese rock band

- Origin: Tokyo, Japan
- Genres: Noise rock, psychedelic rock
- Years active: 1995–present
- Labels: Charnel Music, Fractal
- Members: Kawabata Makoto; Koji Shimura; Kawabe Taigen
- Past members: Hajime Koizumi; Asahito Nanjo; Tatsuya Yoshida
- Website: facebook.com/mainlinerjapan

Mainliner are a noise rock band from Tokyo, Japan. The band was formed in 1995 by guitarist Kawabata Makoto and bassist Asahito Nanjo with the intention of creating a new form of psychedelic music. They released four studio albums before the members went on hiatus to pursue other musical interests. On December 20, 2011, Kawabata Makoto, Koji Shimura and newcomer Kawabe Taigen began recording material. The music from these sessions was released on May 13, 2013, on the new album Revelation Space. The band intended to take part in a world tour in support of the new album, starting with the UK that September.

== Discography ==
- Mellow Out (1996, Charnel Music)
- Psychedelic Polyhedron (1997, Fractal)
- Mainliner Sonic (1997, Charnel Music)
- Imaginative Plain (2001, P.S.F.)
- Revelation Space (2013, Riot Season)
- Dual Myths (2021, Riot Season)
