= Atsuko Ishizuka =

Japanese animator and storyboard artist

- いしづか あつこ
- Born: September 3, 1981 (age 44); Okazaki, Aichi, Japan
- Occupations: Animator, storyboard artist, director
- Years active: 2004–present

Atsuko Ishizuka (いしづか あつこ, Ishizuka Atsuko; born September 3, 1981) is a Japanese animator, storyboard artist and director. She began her animation career after joining Madhouse in 2004.

== Career ==
Ishizuka's journey to becoming an animator was rather unusual by industry standards in Japan. Unlike many of her contemporaries, she did not grow up watching anime on television, but rather developed an interest in music and graphic arts. Upon graduating high school, she decided to focus on graphic design and entered the Aichi Prefectural University of the Arts. While there, she was prompted to do an arts project and chose to do an animated video because it would allow her to combine her two areas of interest. In this way, she entered the animation world not attempting to secure a career, but to make art for art's sake.

During her education at the art school, Ishizuka made a number of short animated films for her own enjoyment, often set to music. One of these films, Gravitation, which was later featured at the 2005 Tehran International Short Film Festival, caught the attention of both the Japanese broadcasting giant NHK and Madhouse. NHK quickly contacted Atsuko with an offer to have her animate a music video segment for the popular and long running short film program Minna no Uta (Everyone's Songs), which was designed to highlight upcoming independent animators and musicians. However, by this time Ishizuka had already been hired by Madhouse as a production assistant, and feeling that it would not be right to accept freelance work outside of the studio, she turned them down. The Minna no Uta staff was unwilling to give up, and they requested that Madhouse take on the music video project with Ishizuka as director. The studio agreed, and in 2004, Atsuko rose through the ranks for her first professional film, Tsuki no Waltz (The Moon Waltz).

Since then, Ishizuka has continued to work on Madhouse projects as a staff animator (including the television series Monster), and has directed an additional short film for Minna no Uta entitled Sen no Hana Sen no Sora (A Thousand Flowers of a Thousand Skies). After this, she moved up to assistant director on Nana. Her art was featured at the 2007 Tokyo International Anime Fair, and Madhouse started to promote her talents publicly, leading some within the industry to speculate she would become the first female series staff director at the studio. Shortly thereafter, it was announced she would again be filling the role of assistant director of the upcoming anime adaptation of the popular Korean online game MapleStory. Her continued rise in prominence at the studio was further confirmed when she was identified (along with Satoshi Kon) by studio head Masao Maruyama as one of the company's talents. She lists Masayuki Kojima and Morio Asaka as the two people at Madhouse she respects most. Ishizuka was finally chosen to direct a television series (along with four others, including Morio Asaka) with the October 2009 release of Aoi Bungaku Series, an adaptation of six Japanese literary classics. She co-directed Supernatural: The Animation alongside Shigeyuki Miya.

== Filmography ==
=== TV series ===
- Monster (2004–2005) – Design production, storyboard (ep 74)
- Nana series (2006–2007) – Assistant director, storyboard (ep 14, 40), episode director (ep 4, 17, 18, 22, 28, 31, 32, 39, 40, 45), key animation (ep 4, 5, 10)
- MapleStory series (2007–2008) – Assistant director, storyboard & episode director (6, 25), storyboard (ep 16, 21)
- Top Secret ~The Revelation~ (2008) – Storyboard & episode director (ep 16, 25)
- Kurozuka (2008) – ED storyboard & direction
- Mōryō no Hako (2008) – Episode director (ep 13)
- Chi's Sweet Home: New Address (2009) – Storyboard (ep 13–16)
- Aoi Bungaku (The Spider's Thread / Hell Screen) (2009) – Director, screenplay, storyboard
- Chihayafuru (2011–2012) – Storyboard (ep 2, 16), episode director & key animation (ep 20)
- Btooom! (2012) – Storyboard (ED)
- The Pet Girl of Sakurasou (2012–2013) – Director, storyboard & episode director (ep 1, 6, ED2), storyboard (ep 8, 23), episode director (ED1, ep 24)
- No Game No Life (2014) – Director, storyboard & episode director (ep 1), storyboard (ep 12)
- Hanayamata (2014) – Director, OP storyboard & direction, storyboard (ep 8), episode director (ep 1, 12)
- Prince of Stride: Alternative (2016) – Director, storyboard & episode director (OP, ep 1), storyboard (ep 2, 3)
- A Place Further than the Universe (2018) – Director, storyboard & episode director (OP, ep 1, 13), storyboard (ep 2, 3, 12)

=== OVA ===
- Supernatural: The Animation series (2011) – Director (ep 2, 3, 6, 7, 9, 10, 11, 15, 16, 18, 20), storyboard & episode director (ep 20), storyboard (ep 2, 7), episode director (ep 1)

=== Films ===
- Forest of Piano (2007) – Unit director
- No Game, No Life Zero (2017) – Director
- Goodbye, Don Glees! (2022) – Director, screenplay

=== Video games ===
- Persona 4 Golden (2012) – Opening animation director
- Persona 4: The Ultimate in Mayonaka Arena (2012) – Animation movie director

=== Music videos ===
- Tsuki no Waltz (2004) – Director
- Sen no Hana, Sen no Sora (2005) – Director
- LUCY (2007) – Director
