= No Game No Life: Zero =

2017 film directed by Atsuko Ishizuka

- Theatrical release poster for the film
- Kanji: ノーゲーム・ノーライフ ゼロ
- Revised Hepburn: Nōgēmu Nōraifu Zero
- Directed by: Atsuko Ishizuka
- Screenplay by: Jukki Hanada
- Based on: No Game No Life by Yuu Kamiya
- Produced by: Shō Tanaka; Mika Shimizu; Kōhei Takeishi; Mitsuhiro Nanbara; Yūki Yoshida
- Cinematography: Akane Fushihara; Yūki Kawashita
- Edited by: Kashiko Kimura
- Music by: Yoshiaki Fujisawa
- Production company: Madhouse
- Distributed by: Kadokawa Animation
- Release date: July 15, 2017 (Japan)
- Running time: 105 minutes
- Country: Japan
- Language: Japanese
- Box office: ¥700 million

No Game No Life: Zero (Japanese: ノーゲーム・ノーライフ ゼロ, Hepburn: Nōgēmu Nōraifu Zero) is a Japanese animated film based on The Gamer Couple Who Challenged the World!, the sixth volume of the light novel series No Game No Life by Yuu Kamiya. The film was directed by Atsuko Ishizuka at studio Madhouse. It premiered in Japan on July 15, 2017. The film has been licensed by Sentai Filmworks in North America, Madman Entertainment in Australia and New Zealand, and by MVM in the United Kingdom and Ireland.

== Plot ==
In the present, Izuna and Tet play a game of chess on which they have wagered food. As they begin their next game, Tet decides to tell her the story of how the world came to be in its current state.

The tale begins 6,000 years in the past, during the Great War, a worldwide conflict that pitted the sentient races of the world against each other as the Old Deus fought for control of the Suniaster, a conceptual device which would only reveal itself to the strongest being on the planet and make the holder the One True God. To that end, the Old Deus and the other races have effectively destroyed the world, and have driven humankind, the only race unable to use the world's magic, to the brink of extinction. Riku, the leader of humanity's last colony along with his sister Corounne, allows another one of his companions die in a Demonia attack while sourcing for information; the death, along with all the others that have come before, plague him with nightmares and guilt. The colony he leads finds itself on the verge of annihilation, with their leader unstable, their numbers dropping, and the battles that endanger their lives around the area becoming more frequent and drawing ever closer.

Delving into a ruined Elvish hideout the next day to investigate, Riku stumbles upon an Ex-Machina that has been severed from its race's hive-mind for its efforts to understand the human heart, a concept that defies its machine logic and thus could not be calculated by the hive-mind. Initially hesitant to help her, Riku eagerly accepts when she challenges him to a game of chess, despite knowing the frightening processing power the Ex-Machina possess; predictably, he loses, and they agree to cooperate with each other, allowing him to take advantage of her logical prowess and letting her stay with him to learn more about the human heart. Since she has only a long, droning designation code assigned to her, Riku, hearing the word "Schwarzer" (German for "black") in her title, names her Schwi after the color of her hair.

Soon after, Schwi accidentally forces Riku to confront the number of people whose deaths he has caused. While this causes a quarrel between them, it helps her gain a deeper understanding of Riku and helps him face his trauma. Through working together, the two realize that they make an incredible team. They then devise a plan to manipulate the stronger races of the world into fighting and using their strongest weapons against each other; by utilizing the power generated from the spirit circuit of all the races, and using Schwi's machinery to shift its direction. They plan to break into the core of the planet and take the Suniaster for their own.

Riku proposes to Schwi, despite the differences in their races and the latter having previously destroyed the former's last home. When the plan begins to destroy his body, Schwi decides to acquire the Suniaster herself to save his life; in the process, she happens to cross paths with Jibril. A vicious battle ensues and Schwi is mortally damaged, but she completes the last step of the plan by reconnecting with the Ex-Machina hive-mind and employing them to aid Riku. Schwi uses the last of her energy to protect Riku's wedding ring as Jibril destroys the rest of her body.

Devastated by Schwi's death, Riku forces himself to complete the plan. The forces of the other races and the Old Deus assemble and fight one last battle; in the end, after the energy from their weapons pierces the planet's core, the Suniaster appears before Riku, but his arm dissolves as he reaches for it, the device having rejected him. He prays aloud to a God of Games, which he used to play with as a child, to take the Suniaster and end the war in his place. Tet, having manifested from Riku's imagination, grants his wish as he dies and takes the Suniaster; he uses it to become the One True God and remake the world, predicating it on the playing of games rather than the use of violence and war.

Returning to the present, Izuna notices remarkable similarities in the story between Schwi and Riku and Shiro and Sora, implying that the latter two are the reincarnations of the former two; in addition, Stephanie, a direct descendant of Corounne, keeps a necklace which belonged to Corounne and bears the names of Riku and Schwi, which the two scratched into its surface themselves. Together, they look towards the future, ready to begin the game.

== Cast ==
Character	Japanese voice actor	English voice actor
Riku / Sora	Yoshitsugu Matsuoka	Scott Gibbs
Schwi / Shiro	Ai Kayano	Caitlynn French
Corounne Dola / Stephanie Dola	Yōko Hikasa	Sara Ornelas
Jibril	Yukari Tamura	Amelia Fischer
Nonna Zell / Kurami Zell	Yuka Iguchi	Brittney Karbowski
Think Nirvalen	Mamiko Noto	Jessica Boone
Izuna Hatsuse	Miyuki Sawashiro	Kira Vincent-Davis
Tet	Rie Kugimiya	Shannon Emerick

== Production ==
The film was announced during the MF Bunko J Summer School Festival 2016 event on July 17, 2016. The film's title was revealed as No Game No Life: Zero on March 3, 2017. The film was produced primarily by staff returning from the earlier anime television series. It was directed by Atsuko Ishizuka and written by Jukki Hanada, with animation by studio Madhouse. Satoshi Tasaki designed the series' characters. The film's music was composed by Yoshiaki Fujisawa and produced by Kadokawa. Other returning staff includes Eiji Iwase (art director), Tsukasa Ohira (art setting), Harue Ono (color key artist), Kenji Fujita (director of photography), Shuhei Yabuta (3D director), Kashiko Kimura (editor), Jin Aketagawa (sound director), Kazuhiro Hocchi (concept art), and Tsukasa Ohira (background art). Konomi Suzuki, who performed the opening theme for the television anime, also performed the main theme song for the film, "There is a Reason".

== Release ==
The film premiered in Japan on July 15, 2017. It was initially screened in 61 theaters before expanding to 178. It then had a 4DX release in 48 theaters across Japan starting on September 9, 2017. The film was released on home video in Japan on February 23, 2018.

On June 12, 2017, Sentai Filmworks announced that they had licensed the film. Azoland Pictures distributed the film theatrically in the United States, and it premiered with an English dub at the Los Angeles Anime Film Festival on September 15, 2016, and with English subtitles on September 16, 2017. It was then released nationwide on October 5, 2017 (English subbed) and October 8, 2017 (dubbed). Sentai will release the film on home video on August 28, 2018.

Madman Entertainment licensed the film for release in Australia and New Zealand, screened it with English subtitles at the Madman Anime Festival in Melbourne on November 5, 2017.

MVM has licensed the film in the United Kingdom, and released it in 2018.

== Reception ==
The film opened at number 7 in the Japanese box office, before dropping to number 10 on its second weekend. It had grossed ¥500 million as of August 18, 2017, and ¥700 million as of September 30, 2017.

According to the Oricon sales charts, the film's limited edition Blu-ray sold 29,586 copies, while the standard edition Blu-ray sold 6,133 copies and the standard edition DVD sold 4,068 copies.

Kim Morrissy of Anime News Network gave the film a positive review, writing that "as a standalone prequel, I couldn't have asked for anything better." She felt that the film was more trimmed-down and succinct than the television series, allowing it to focus more its message about the potential of humanity without the "intrusive fanservice" of the original. She also praised the film's animation, and felt that it was the best work that Atsuko Ishizuka had produced so far as a director. Cold Cobra of Anime UK News praised it as a "really fun and well written slice of rather odd action," noting that the story is "so good on its own" and serves as a "good blend of drama and action" that benefits from a clear, bright, and smooth "movie budget" animation. While expressing minor disappointment that the production opted for a prequel rather than continuing the original narrative, the critic concludes that it remains a "good stand-alone story that really adds to the original work" and ultimately forgives the framing choice because the new story is "good enough."

Rachel Cheung of the South China Morning Post gave the film 2.5 out of 5 stars, opining that it would satisfy fans of the original material but would leave newcomers confused.
