= High Rise (band) =

Japanese noise rock band

- Origin: Tokyo, Japan
- Genre: Noise rock
- Years active: 1982–2002
- Labels: La Musica, P.S.F.
- Past members: Shoji Hano; Shimura Koji; Asahito Nanjo; Munehiro Narita; Pill; Ikuro Takahashi; Yuro Ujiie; Tatsuya Yoshida

High Rise was a Japanese noise rock band from Tokyo, formed in 1982. The core of the band has consisted of bassist Asahito Nanjo and guitarist Munehiro Narita. The group named themselves after the 1975 novel High Rise by J. G. Ballard. Their music draws from psychedelic music, free jazz and improvisational music.

== History ==
High Rise were originally performing under the name Psychedelic Speed Freaks and contained members Masashi Mitani, Asahito Nanjo, Munehiro Narita, and Ikuro Takahashi. They decided to change their name at the advice of P.S.F. Records, which claimed Psychedelic Speed Freaks sounded "too direct".

Munehiro Narita died on July 3, 2022. His death was not announced until January 2026.

== Discography ==
Studio albums

- II (1986, P.S.F.)
- Dispersion (1992, P.S.F.)
- Disallow (1996, P.S.F.)
- Desperado (1998, P.S.F.)

Live albums

- Psychedelic Speed Freaks (1984, P.S.F.)
- Live (1994, P.S.F.)
- Psychobomb -U.S. Tour 2000- (2000, P.S.F.)

Compilation albums

- Psychedelic Speed Freaks '84-'85 (1997, Time Bomb)
- Destination (2002, P.S.F.)
