= Shizuka Miura =

Ball-jointed doll maker and musician (1962-2010)

- 三浦静香
- Shizuka at Studio AMS (1994)
- Pronunciation: IPA: [ɕizɯᵝka̠ mʲiɯ̟ᵝɾa̠]
- Born: 静香; 7 March 1962; Japan
- Died: 31 January 2010 (aged 47); Japan
- Occupations: Ball-jointed doll maker; singer; songwriter; guitarist
- Years active: ?–2010
- Known for: Shizuka
- Spouse: Maki Miura (?−2010)
- Children: 1
- Musical career
- Origin: Tokyo, Japan
- Genres: Rock; folk; psychedelic
- Instruments: Vocals; guitar; bells
- Years active: 1992–2010
- Labels: PSF; Persona Non Grata; Last Visible Dog; Fra, Inc.

Japanese name
- Kanji: 三浦静香
- Hiragana: みうら しずか
Transcriptions
- Romanization: Miura Shizuka

Shizuka Miura (三浦 静香, Miura Shizuka; IPA: [ɕizɯᵝka̠ mʲiɯ̟ᵝɾa̠]; 7 March 1962 – 31 January 2010) was a Japanese ball-jointed doll maker, singer, songwriter, and guitarist. She became recognized in Japan for her doll work. Worldwide, Shizuka is best known for having been the founder and front woman of the rock band Shizuka.

== Biography ==
Shizuka Miura initiated in the art of dollmaking under the influence and mentorship of master dollmaker Katan Amano. Shizuka became recognized in Japan notably for her gothic ball-jointed dolls.

In circa 1992, Shizuka started her musical career by adapting her poetry into music. Initially, she rented venues and performed by herself. Shizuka soon formed an eponymous band with musicians from the Tokyo psychedelic underground scene. With the group, she worked on the release of a studio album, three live albums, and two video albums. Shizuka also performed in many live shows in Japan, two tours in the United States, and a festival in Scotland.

Shizuka died by suicide on circa 31 January 2010. Mason Jones wrote that "it may have been due to medication", (Note: Extended excerpt: "(...) it was a suicide. Apparently, it may have been due to medication, but at this point we'll simply never know".) but it remains publicly unknown. On 25 April, a DVD-video album was released by PSF Records as a tribute to Shizuka containing one of the last live performances by her group recorded at the ShowBoat live venue in Tokyo on 30 December 2008.

== Artistry ==
=== Dollmaking ===
Shizuka made modern ball-jointed dolls. Her dolls have been described as "haunted, ethereal-looking", "stunning", "sickly-looking", "beautiful and spooky".

=== Musical influences ===
Shizuka was prompted to compose music after seeing Maki Miura adapting a poems of hers to music. When asked about her favorite band, Shizuka mentioned Les Rallizes Dénudés in regards to the Japanese psychedelic scene.

=== Musical styles and voice ===
Shizuka's music, together with her band, spanned psychedelic, folk, noise rock, acid rock, and neo-psychedelia. Musical instruments she played included guitar, and bells.

Shizuka possessed distinctive vocals: chanted, slow, plaintive, and tremulous, often connoting sadness and a "gothic atmosphere". Her vocals were imperfect and sometimes tuneless, but these aspects added an emotional edge as part of the band's style.

=== Songwriting ===
Shizuka's band usual creative process started by listening to Shizuka singing lyrics, jam together, and only then arrange the song. She attributed the slow tempo in most of her music to she writing them at her natural pace, and not to a deliberate endeavor. She also said that she presented her inspiration, which in turn came from her personal experiences, in music. She wrote the song "Planning for Loneliness" (孤獨を圖る, Kodoku o Hakaru) based on her experience of having stomach cancer in the late 1980s while she also had a child who was one and a half years old, and often performed this piece with her band because she considered it important to her.

When inspiration comes, I follow it to find the material for modelling my creative work, which may eventually be presented in the form of music or doll. Both of them are the products of my private universe, they come from the same inspiration, and all inspiration comes from my experience.

— Shizuka telling how she might present her personal experiences in art, Rocker

== Personal life ==
Shizuka was married to Japanese guitarist Maki Miura. She had a child in the late 1980s, and also had stomach cancer around that time.

== Discography ==
Studio albums

- Heavenly Persona (天界のペルソナ, Tenkai no Perusona) (1994)

Live albums

- Live Shizuka (1995)
- Tokyo Underground 20, Jul '95 (2000)
- Traditional Aesthetics (伝承美学, Denshō Bigaku) (2008)
- Paradise of Delusion (妄想の楽園, Mousou no Rakuen) (2021)

Video albums

- Shizuka (静香) (c. 1995)
  - Hikyoku no Seiseki: Live at Manda-La2 1993 & Studio Ams 1994 (秘曲の成績) (2009, reissue)
- Endless Dream (終わりのない夢, Owari no Nai Yume) (2010)
