= No Game No Life =

Japanese light novel series and its adaptations

- Cover of the first light novel featuring Shiro (left) and Sora (bottom right)

ノーゲーム・ノーライフ (Nō Gēmu Nō Raifu)
- Genre: Fantasy; Science fiction; Isekai
- Light novel
- Written by: Yuu Kamiya
- Published by: Media Factory
- English publisher: NA: Yen Press
- Imprint: MF Bunko J
- Original run: April 25, 2012 – present
- Volumes: 13
- Manga
- Written by: Yuu Kamiya
- Illustrated by: Yuu Kamiya; Mashiro Hiiragi
- Published by: Media Factory
- English publisher: NA: Seven Seas Entertainment
- Magazine: Monthly Comic Alive
- Original run: January 27, 2013 – present
- Volumes: 2
- Anime television series
- Directed by: Atsuko Ishizuka
- Produced by: Yōhei Hayashi; Shō Tanaka; Mika Shimizu; Satoshi Fukao; Asako Shimizu
- Written by: Jukki Hanada
- Music by: SuperSweep: Shinji Hosoe; Takahiro Eguchi; Ayako Sasō; Fumihisa Tanaka
- Studio: Madhouse
- Licensed by: AUS: Hanabee; NA: Sentai Filmworks; SEA: Medialink; UK: MVM Films
- Original network: AT-X, Tokyo MX, Sun TV, KBS, TV Aichi, BS11
- English network: NA: Anime Network
- Original run: April 9, 2014 – June 25, 2014
- Episodes: 12
- Manga

No Game No Life, Please!
- Written by: Yuizaki Kazuya
- Published by: Media Factory
- English publisher: NA: Yen Press
- Magazine: Monthly Comic Alive
- Original run: May 27, 2015 – November 27, 2017
- Volumes: 4
- Manga

Eastern Union Arc
- Written by: Yuu Kamiya
- Illustrated by: Ryu Naitou
- Published by: Media Factory
- English publisher: NA: Yen Press
- Magazine: Monthly Comic Alive
- Original run: November 27, 2021 – present
- Volumes: 3
- Anime film
- No Game No Life: Zero (2017)
- icon

No Game No Life (Japanese: ノーゲーム・ノーライフ, Hepburn: Nō Gēmu Nō Raifu) is a Japanese light novel series by Yuu Kamiya. It is published under the MF Bunko J imprint with twelve novels released between April 25, 2012, and February 25, 2023. The author and his wife, Mashiro Hiiragi, adapted the novels into a manga series for Monthly Comic Alive in 2013. Later that year, an anime adaptation of No Game No Life by Madhouse was announced. It premiered on AT-X between April and July 2014, and was simulcast outside Japan by Crunchyroll. An anime film adaptation of the sixth volume, No Game No Life: Zero, premiered on July 15, 2017. A spinoff manga, No Game No Life, Please!, focusing on the character Izuna, ran from May 27, 2015, to November 27, 2017. A second manga adaptation, focusing on volumes two and three of the light novel, ran from November 27, 2021, until January 2025, when it went on an extended hiatus. The No Game No Life franchise was localized in North America by several companies: Seven Seas Entertainment licensed the first manga adaptation, Sentai Filmworks the anime, and Yen Press the light novel series, as well as the second manga adaptation and spin-off manga.

The series follows Sora and his younger stepsister Shiro, two hikikomori who make up the identity of Blank, an undefeated group of gamers. One day, they are challenged by the god of games to chess and are victorious. As a result, the god summons them to Disboard, a world where stealing, war, and killing are forbidden, and all matters are decided through games, including national borders and even people's lives. Intent on maintaining their reputation as the undefeated gamers, Sora and Shiro plan to conquer the sixteen ruling species and to usurp the god of games.

The series began receiving recognition in 2014, when it appeared in Kono Light Novel ga Sugoi! and had its volumes placed as one of the top thirty selling novels in Japan. It was reported in May 2017 that over 3 million printed copies are in circulation. The English localization of the manga and anime were also well received: the manga adaptation appeared on The New York Times Manga Best Sellers; meanwhile, English reviewers were generally turned away by the first episode of the anime, though reviewers who have completed the series generally praised the character dynamics, game strategies, and animation, while disliking the fan service featuring the child character, Shiro.

== Plot ==
Sora and Shiro are two hikikomori stepsiblings who are known in the online gaming world as Blank, an undefeated group of gamers. One day, they are challenged to a game of chess by Tet, a god from another reality. The two are victorious and are offered to live in a world that centers around games. They accept, believing it to be a joke, and are summoned to a reality known as Disboard. (Note: Japanese: 盤上の世界, Hepburn: Disubōdo) There, a spell known as the Ten Covenants prevents the citizens of Disboard from inflicting harm on one another, forcing them to resolve their differences by gambling with games whose rules and rewards are magically enforced. In-game, rule enforcement only occurs when the method of cheating is acknowledged and outed by the opponent, allowing players to cheat through discreet methods. Sora and Shiro traverse to Elkia, (Note: エルキア, Erukia) the nation inhabited by humans, and befriend the duchess Stephanie Dola. Learning about Elkia's decline, the two participate in a tournament to determine the next ruler; after winning the crown, they earn the right to challenge the Disboard's other species as humanity's representative.^{LN 1.4} Their next goal is to conquer all sixteen species in order to challenge Tet to a game; as of the sixth volume, five of the sixteen are under their control.

== Publication and conception ==
No Game No Life is a light novel series written and illustrated by Yuu Kamiya. It is published under the MF Bunko J imprint; the first volume was published by Media Factory on April 25, 2012, and thirteen volumes have been published as of April 24, 2026. In August 2014, Yen Press announced No Game No Life will be one of its titles published under its newly launched imprint, Yen On, in 2015. Non-English localizations include Brazil, Taiwan and Russia. Distribution in China was banned due to the government viewing the series as a threat to communism, while the Australian Classification Board banned the selling or importing of volumes 1, 2, and 9 in Australia for containing content that is "likely to cause offence to a reasonable adult".

No Game No Life was conceived during the serialization of A Dark Rabbit Has Seven Lives.^{LN 1.A} Kamiya's original idea was a fantasy setting with battles; since he disliked drawing battles, he replaced it with games. He had intended to turn the idea into a manga series, but an unspecified illness made him unfit to handle the workload. While hospitalized for treatment, the author imagined how his idea would work as a light novel, and settled for that medium instead.^{LN 1.A} Kamiya began writing the first volume and was advised to break it into three parts due to its length.^{LN 2.A} In the middle of writing the second volume, Kamiya moved to his home country, Brazil, for further treatment for his ailment; in order to meet the volume's deadline, his wife drew some of the illustrations in the novel.^{LN 2.A}

After the third volume, a new editor was assigned to the series.^{LN 3.A} Kamiya noted the third volume contained a lot of plot progression, and was going to balance it out in the fourth volume with more lighthearted and carefree events.^{LN 3.A} Volumes four and five were written as a single volume; since volume four lacked a climactic ending, Kamiya had to restructure the story.^{LN 4.A} This, along with communication problems with his new editor, and other problems in Kamiya's life caused a month delay in volume four's release.^{LN 4.A} After completing volume five, Kamiya was asked to submit volume six's manuscript before 2014 for the anime adaptation, and to complete the volume before the anime's premiere.^{LN 5.A, 6.A}

No.	Title	Original release date	English release date
1	In This Fantasy World, Everything's a Game—and These Gamer Siblings Play to Win! (Note: ゲーマー兄妹がファンタジー世界を征服するそうです, Gēmā Kyōdai ga Fantajī Sekai o Seifuku Suru sō Desu)	April 25, 2012; 978-4-04-066432-3	April 21, 2015; 978-0-316-38311-0
Prologue; Chapter 1: Beginner; Chapter 2: Challenger; Chapter 3: Expert; Chapter 4: Grandmaster; Epilogue
Sora and Shiro are two siblings who are known in online games as Blank, an undefeated group of gamers. In real life, they are ostracized by the world and are hikikomori. One day, they receive a challenge from Tet to a game of chess and are victorious. In response he offers to send them to a world which revolves around games and they accept, believing it to be a joke. They are then summoned to a reality known as Disboard where a spell, called the Ten Covenants, prevents violence and enforces the rules and outcomes of games. They travel to Elkia, the nation of humans, and befriend Stephanie Dola who is the granddaughter of the deceased king. Learning the nation is in steady decline, Sora and Shiro enter the contest to be the next king where they win against Chlammy Zell in a war simulator. After they are inaugurated to the throne, Sora publicly declares his intentions to conquer the other nations and help Elkia flourish. Tet meets and congratulates them, declaring he will be waiting for them to unite the sixteen species.
2	The Gamer Siblings Have Their Eyes on a New Target—the Land of the Animal Girls... (Note: ゲーマー兄妹が獣耳っ子の国に目をつけたようです, Gēmā Kyōdai ga Kemomimikko no Kuni ni Me o Tsuketa yō desu)	September 25, 2012; 978-4-04-066433-0	July 21, 2015; 978-0-316-38517-6
Opening; Chapter 1: Weak Square; Chapter 2: Interesting; Chapter 3: Sacrifice; Chapter 4: Checkmate; Fake End
Sora and Shiro begin researching the Eastern Union, nation of the Werebeasts. They challenge a Flügel named Jibril for information and the two play a game of materialization word chain, where their spoken objects will either materialize or disappear. The game concludes when Sora and Shiro induce a hypernova by nullifying Coulomb's law, making Jibril unable to continue; by the Ten Covenants, Jibril becomes their slave. However, the information from Jibril and her library prove to be useless. Stephanie discloses her grandfather's will to Sora, leading them to discover a hidden library in the castle containing her grandfather's research. Realizing the Eastern Union are using video games, Sora and Shiro formalize their challenge by betting everything humanity owns. As they await the game's date, Sora tells Shiro the missing piece to their victory will soon arrive; the next day, Shiro discovers everyone has forgotten about Sora.
3	One Half of the Gamer Siblings Has Disappeared! (Note: ゲーマー兄妹の片割れが消えたようですが...?, Gēmā Kyōdai no Kataware ga Kieta yō desuga...?)	January 25, 2013; 978-4-04-066434-7	October 27, 2015; 978-0-316-38519-0
Loading; Chapter 1: Sky Walk—Dissociation; Chapter 2: Blue Rose—Orientation; Chapter 3: Killing Giants—Induction; Chapter 4: Rule Number 10—Convergence; True End
Shiro begins to doubt Sora's existence but learns she and her friends have a gap in their memory. Straining herself, Shiro recalls that Sora arranged a game of Othello with Chlammy and her Elf comrade Fiel Nirvalen; the components making up Sora and Chlammy's identity were used as the pieces. Sora's three remaining pieces were Shiro's memories of him, allowing her to resume and win the game. Having seen each other's memories, Sora convinces Chlammy to ally herself with him. The game against the Eastern Union begins and Sora, Shiro, Stephanie, and Jibril enter a virtual shooter against the Werebeast, Izuna Hatsuse, where they are eventually victorious. As a result, Elkia gains a large mass of land and rights to the Werebeasts occupying them. Sora and Shiro use political pressure to force the leader of the Eastern Union, the nameless Shrine Maiden, to challenge them; the game is a coin flip where Sora arranges to have it land on its edge. He convinces the Shrine Maiden to declare they both win and as a result, Elkia can share resources with the Eastern Union while the Werebeasts maintain their self-rule; they name the unionized colony between Elkia and the Eastern Union as the Commonwealth of Elkia.
4	The Gamer Siblings Have Run Away from a Realistic Romance Game (Note: ゲーマー兄妹はリアル恋愛ゲームから逃げ出しました, Gēmā Kyōdai wa Riaru Ren'ai Gēmu Kara Nigedashi Mashita)	June 25, 2013; 978-4-04-066469-9	March 22, 2016; 978-0-316-38521-3
Easy Start; Chapter 1: Encounter; Chapter 2: Strategist; Chapter 3: Charmer; Chapter 4: Wild Card; Interrupt End
A Dhampir named Plum Stoker visits Sora and Shiro, and asks them to save his species. He explains the queen of the Sirens, Laila Lorelei, put herself to sleep using the Ten Covenants centuries ago and as a result, the once mutualistic relationship between Dhampirs and Sirens has caused all but one male Dhampir to die. To awaken the queen, they must enter her dream and win her love. After consulting with the Shrine Maiden, Sora and his companions travel to the Dhampir and Siren country, Oceand, and enter the queen's dream. Using Plum's magic, the queen falls in love with Izuna's grandfather, Ino Hatsuse, but fails to awaken. Having deduced this possibility, Sora uses a loophole in the rules allowing him and his companions to leave mid-game. Sora and Shiro reveal the Sirens do not know the conditions to wake the queen, so they split up to investigate; Sora, Shiro, Jibril, and Plum travel to Avent Heim, home of the Flügel, while Stephanie and Izuna search the previous king's hidden library.
5	These Gamer Siblings are Badasses—and They Hate Selecting a “New Game” (Note: ゲーマー兄妹は強くてニューゲームがお嫌いなようです, Gēmā Kyōdai wa Tsuyoku te Nyū Gēmu ga Okirai na yō Desu)	November 25, 2013; 978-4-04-066080-6	December 20, 2016; 978-0-316-38523-7
Normal Start; Chapter 1: Trial; Chapter 2: Error; Chapter 3: Review; Chapter 4: React; Never-Ending
The prologue covers Chlammy and Fiel's progress in their efforts to overthrow the Elves. Meanwhile, Sora and company are overwhelmed by Avent Heim's library. They decide to challenge all the Flügel to a game to enlist their help; the goal of the game is for Sora and Shiro to avoid capture by using Plum's flight magic and various katakana characters to materialize whatever they desire. Eluding capture, Sora and Shiro use the game to convince the head Flügel, Azril, to have Avent Heim join the Commonwealth of Elkia. After winning, Avent Heim's library proves to be fruitless but Shiro deduces what the queen desires; at the same time, Stephanie and Izuna finds evidence to support her theory. Returning to Laila's dream, Sora's immunity to the queen's seduction fulfills her desire of unrequited love and awakens her; their victory gives them rule over the Sirens and Dhampirs. That night, Plum reveals humanity also acquired the sirens' role as food for the Dhampirs and attempts to feed on Sora and Shiro; however, the two had deduced Plum's intention from the beginning and returned the responsibility back to the Sirens.
6	The Gamer Couple Who Challenged the World! (Note: ゲーマー夫嫁は世界に挑んだそうです, Gēmā Fusai wa Sekai ni Idonda sō Desu)	April 25, 2014; 978-4-04-066382-1	July 25, 2017; 978-0-316-38526-8
Opening Talk; Chapter 1: Hopeless; Chapter 2: Reckless; Chapter 3: Deathless; Chapter 4: Helpless; Chapter 5: Selfless; Ending Talk
Tet explains how the war 6,000 years ago ended to Izuna. Tet's story follows eighteen-year old Riku Dola and his stepsister Korone Dola, leaders of a colony of humans seeking refuge from the war. While on patrol, Riku befriends an Ex-Machina, a sentient battle-capable android, who is searching for the meaning of a heart. At Riku's request, she names herself Schwarzer, which Riku shortens to Schwi. He then takes her back to the colony where they are disguised as lovers. During the year they are together, Riku overcomes his emotional trauma while Schwi becomes more human. Following the destruction of their colony, Riku forms a group to end the war and marries Schwi. The group performs several espionage missions, forcing the warring species into a stalemate. Riku plans to harvest the energy from the battle, following the broken stalemate, in order to materialize and claim an artifact called the Suniaster; whoever possess it will have the powers of god. Schwi is killed by Jibril but is able to convince the Ex-Machina to join Riku's cause. Riku succeeds but is mortally wounded; in his place, Tet claims the Suniaster and brings peace to the world. Returning to the present, Sora and friends have the Shrine Maiden channel an old deus for a game.
7	Looks Like the Gamer Siblings Are Changing Everything! (Note: ゲーマー兄妹たちは定石を覆すそうです, Gēmā Kyōdai-tachi wa Jōseki o Kutsugaesu sō Desu)	July 24, 2015; 978-4-04-067494-0	October 30, 2018; 978-0-316-31643-9
Theoretical Start; Chapter 1: Closed Circle; Chapter 2: Whodunit; Chapter 3: Howdunit; Chapter 4: Whydunit; Practical End
The Old Deus is the Werebeast God; she creates a life sized board game and allows Sora and his friends to participate. With a time limit to reach the goal, the winner will be granted a wish but if no one reaches the end, they will be forced into the god's servitude. In addition, the Werebeast God has planted a traitor within Sora's party. Towards the end, Jibril challenges Sora and Shiro to a game.
8	Looks Like the Gamer Siblings Will Inherit the Legend! (Note: ゲーマーたちは布石を継いでいくそうです, Gēmā-tachi wa Fuseki o Tsuide Iku sō Desu)	December 25, 2015; 978-4-04-067952-5	April 2, 2019; 978-0-316-50266-5
Continue; Chapter 1: Preparation; Chapter 2: Handover; Chapter 3: Disclosure; Chapter 4: Who Are You?; Ideal End
Jibril's challenge is a simulation of the war from volume six, and challenges Sora and Shiro to lead the humans to victory. After completing her challenge, Sora reveals that the Stephanie accompanying them was a fake created by the Old Deus; Stephanie's empathy with the party allows her to betray her creator and leads Sora and Shiro to victory. Since the Old Deuses lack a leader to pledge their servitude, Sora plans to have the Werebeast God take that role.
9	Looks Like the Gamer Siblings Are Skipping a Turn! (Note: ゲーマー兄妹は一ターン休むそうです, Gēmā Kyōdai wa Ichi Tān Yasumu sō Desu)	August 25, 2016; 978-4-04-068457-4	October 29, 2019; 978-0-316-47134-3
Skip Start; Chapter 1: Definite; Chapter 2: Retroduction; Chapter 3: Oracle Maker; Chapter 4: The Game of Life; One-Turn End
The Ex-Machina teleport into Elkia and challenge Sora to a game in order to save their species. Since Sora is compatible with their reproduction program, the Ex-Machina intend on enslaving him in order to repopulate their species. Blank and the Ex-Machina decide to wager Sora's freedom on a game: if Blank wins, the Ex-Machina are freed from their chastity program and are free to reproduce with any being; if they lose, Sora is taken and used for reproduction. The game is a variant of chess played in rhythm to an ongoing concert. Blank wins though the Ex-Machina Ymirein stays behind, intending on becoming Sora's wife.
G1	Practical War Game (Note: プラクティカルウォーゲーム, Purakutikaru Wō Gēmu)	December 23, 2016; 978-4-04-068767-4; 978-4-04-068666-0 (SE)	October 5, 2021; 978-1-9753-1967-0
Abstract War Game; Practical War Game; Threefold Levitation; One Pair or Heart Straight Flush; High Card All Raise (Part 1); High Card All Raise (Part 2)
10	Looks Like the Gamer Siblings Have a Tab to Pay! (Note: ゲーマー兄妹は過去(ツケ)を払わされるようです, Gēmā Kyōdai wa Kako (Tsuke) o Harawasareru Yōdesu)	February 24, 2018; 978-4-04-069336-1	February 18, 2020; 978-1-9753-8678-8
Re:Start; Chapter 1: Another Age; Chapter 2: Silent Line; Chapter 3: Formula Front; Chapter 4: Verdict Day; Chapter 5: For Answer; Crash/END
Blank receives a letter of challenge from the Dwarves in a wager for their chess piece.
11	Looks Like the Gamer Siblings and Friends Can't Leave Unless They Becomes Couples! (Note: ゲーマー兄妹たちはカップルにならなきゃ出られないそうです, Gēmā Kyōdai-tachi wa Kappuru ni Naranakya de Rarenai Sōdesu)	November 25, 2021; 978-4-04-065382-2	May 17, 2022; 978-1-9753-4549-5
Stream Start; Chapter 1: Vertical Thinking—In the Bottom; Chapter 2: Horizontal Thinking—Lateral Approach; Chapter 3: Parallel Thinking—Point at Infinity; Chapter 4: Orientation Shift—Turning World; Temporary End
12	The Gamer Siblings Battle the Devil (Note: ゲーマー兄妹たちは『魔王』に挑むようです, Gēmā Kyōdai-tachi wa "Maō" ni Idomu Yōdesu)	February 25, 2023; 978-4-04-682039-6	November 21, 2023; 978-1-9753-7035-0
Prelude; Chapter 1: Phantasma—The Devil Appears!; Chapter 2: Phantoma—The Hero Flees!; Chapter 3: Meta-Fantasy—The Heroes Attack!; Role-Playing End
13	Looks Like the Gamer Siblings are Trying to Defeat (or Save) the Devil (Note: ゲーマー兄妹たちは『魔王』を討つ（すくう）ようです, Gēmā Kyōdai-tachi wa "Maō" o Utsu（Sukū）Yōdesu)	April 24, 2026; 978-4-04-682865-1	—

== Manga adaptation ==
After reviewing the drawings made by Yuu Kamiya's wife, Mashiro Hiiragi, in the second light novel volume, his editor suggested the two collaborate on a manga adaptation of No Game No Life for Monthly Comic Alive.^{LN 2.A} Due to Kamiya's work on the third light novel volume, the manga serialization was delayed by a volume; the volume it was supposed to premiere in contained an apology page illustrated by Hiiragi.^{LN 3.A} The series premiered in the March 2013 volume of Monthly Comic Alive and since then, is published irregularly in the magazine. Media Factory collected the individual chapters for the tankōbon release. In March 2014, Seven Seas Entertainment announced its licensing of the manga series and released the first tankōbon volume in October 2014; the title is stylized as No Game, No Life. The series has also been localized in Brazil, Taiwan and Russia.

A side series, titled No Game No Life, Please!, (Note: ノーゲーム・ノーライフ・です!, Nō Gēmu Nō Raifu Desu!) by Yuizaki Kazuya, began serialization in the July 2015 issue of Monthly Comic Alive on May 27, 2015. The final chapter was published on November 27, 2017. It focuses on Izuna Hatsuse and her daily life. Yen Press announced their license to the manga on October 28, 2016.

A manga adaptation of volumes two and three of the light novel, titled No Game No Life Chapter 2: Eastern Union Arc (Note: ノーゲーム・ノーライフ 第二章 東部連合編, Nō Gēmu Nō Raifu Dai ni Shō Tōbu Rengō-hen) and illustrated by Ryu Naitou, began serialization on the January 2022 issue of Monthly Comic Alive on November 27, 2021. The serialization has been on an extended hiatus since January 2025. Three tankōbon volumes have been released as of December 2024. Yen Press also licensed this adaptation, with the first English volume releasing on June 4, 2024.

=== No Game, No Life ===
No.	Original release date	Original ISBN	English release date	English ISBN
1	November 23, 2013	978-4-04-066114-8	October 21, 2014	978-1-62692-079-8
2	February 23, 2018	978-4-04-069582-2	January 8, 2019	978-1-64275-037-9

=== No Game No Life, Please! ===
No.	Original release date	Original ISBN	English release date	English ISBN
1	January 23, 2016	978-4-04-067878-8	June 20, 2017	978-0-316-47192-3
2	August 23, 2016	978-4-04-068525-0	September 19, 2017	978-0-316-47237-1
3	April 22, 2017	978-4-04-069165-7	February 6, 2018	978-0-316-51767-6
4	January 23, 2018	978-4-04-069535-8	September 18, 2018	978-1-9753-0178-1

=== Eastern Union Arc ===
No.	Original release date	Original ISBN	English release date	English ISBN
1	June 22, 2022	978-4-04-681079-3	June 4, 2024	978-1-9753-9407-3
2	February 21, 2023	978-4-04-682141-6	October 29, 2024	979-8-8554-0075-5
3	December 23, 2024	978-4-04-682959-7	March 24, 2026	979-8-8554-2687-8

== Anime adaptation ==
On July 27, 2013, Monthly Comic Alive announced the anime adaptation for No Game No Life was green lit. It is directed by Atsuko Ishizuka and animated by Madhouse. The series premiered on April 9, 2014, on AT-X; it was later broadcast on five other broadcast stations and several streaming networks. The final episode premiered on June 25, 2014. Media Factory released the series in six DVD and Blu‑ray volumes between June 25 and November 26, 2014. The opening theme for the series was "This Game" by Konomi Suzuki and the ending theme is "Oracion" by Shiro's voice actress, Ai Kayano.

Crunchyroll simulcast No Game No Life and made it accessible to several regions. In North America, Anime Network broadcast the series on their cable network and made it available on their website, while Sentai Filmworks released the series for home media in July 2015. In the United Kingdom, MVM Entertainment licensed the series for distribution and in Australasia, Hanabee Entertainment licensed the series for its video on demand website. In France, the series was also simulcasted on Anime Digital Network and is broadcast on Viacom International Media Networks' J-one channel. In China, the series is made available on PPTV.

Yoshitsugu Matsuoka and Ai Kayano, the voice actors for Sora and Shiro respectively, hosted an internet radio show on Hibiki Radio called No Radio No Life. It was broadcast weekly between April 8 and July 29, 2014, and switched to a biweekly schedule since then. Twenty-six segments are planned and three CDs were released between July 2014 and February 2015. A special cross over featuring No Radio No Life and the radio series from Bladedance of Elementalers and Lord Marksman and Vanadis was broadcast by Hibiki Radio on January 1, 2015, and released on DVD on May 13.

An anime movie adaptation of the sixth light novel was announced on July 17, 2016, at the MF Bunko J Summer School Festival 2016 event. The film, titled No Game No Life: Zero, premiered on July 15, 2017, with the staff and cast from the anime series returning. Based on the sixth volume of the light novel series, the story is set 6000 years before the events of the series, with most of the original cast portraying ancient characters related to their present counterparts. The theme song is "There is a Reason" by Suzuki. The song was included on the album "No Song No Life" on July 12, 2017. Sentai Filmworks released the film theatrically within the United States from October 5, 2017, and has licensed the film for home video distribution. Madman Entertainment premiered the film in Australia at the Madman Anime Festival in Melbourne on November 5, 2017.

After the acquisition of Crunchyroll by Sony Pictures Television, the parent company of Funimation in 2021, No Game No Life, among several Sentai titles, was dropped from the Crunchyroll streaming service on March 31, 2022.

=== Episode list ===
==== No Game No Life ====
No.	English title Original Japanese title	Directed by	Written by	Original air date	Ref
1	"Beginner" "Biginā" (素人(ビギナー))	Kōji Ōdate	Jukki Hanada	April 9, 2014	
Stepsiblings Sora and Shiro are known as Blank, an undefeated online gaming group. In reality, they are both agoraphobic hikikomori. After five consecutive days, they are challenged to a game of chess by an anonymous player. When Sora and Shiro are victorious, they are offered to be sent to a world run by games. Once they accept, they are suddenly summoned to an alternate world called Disboard by the anonymous player now recognized as the god of play named Tet, who departs after explaining that Disboard is governed by a set of rules called the Ten Covenants. After humiliating three bandits, Sora and Shiro travel to a hotel at Elkia, a nation inhabited by humans, where Stephanie Dola and Chlammy Zell are seen playing a game of poker to determine the next ruler. Sora is challenged to a game of poker against a woman named Lady Attitude for her sack of gold coins. Sora wins with a royal straight flush after Lady plays a full house. Soon after, Sora secretly informs Stephanie that Chlammy is cheating. While planning to stay at the inn for four nights, Sora and Shiro look forward to their new life in Disboard.
2	"Challenger" "Charenjā" (挑戦者(チャレンジャー))	Masaru Koseki	Jukki Hanada	April 16, 2014	
Having lost against Chlammy in their game of poker, Stephanie confronts Sora for not revealing how Chlammy cheated. Sora ropes Stephanie into a game of rock paper scissors. Stephanie begins to overthink when Sora claims that he will only play paper, leading her to play scissors, yet he easily wins by playing rock instead. Sora uses the Ten Covenants in order to make Stephanie fall in love with him, though Shiro makes the situation awkward. Sora and Shiro then move into the kingdom of Elkia with Stephanie, who later explains that Imanity represents the human race within Disboard. Imanity is the sixteenth ranked sentient race of the Exceed because they have no affinity to magic whatsoever. Stephanie desires to prove that her deceased grandfather Makoto Dola, the former king of Elkia, was not a foolish king. Sora uses the Ten Covenants in order to convince Chlammy to wear Stephanie's heirloom dress in preparation for her coronation. Afterwards, Sora and Shiro set off to help Stephanie prove that Makoto was not a foolish king.
3	"Expert" "Ekisupāto" (熟練者(エキスパート))	Masaki Hyuga	Jukki Hanada	April 23, 2014	
As Sora, Shiro and Stephanie crash Chlammy's coronation, they reveal that Chlammy won games by using magic from Fiel Nirvalen, who is one of the Elves, the seventh ranked pointy-eared race living in vast land of Elven Gard. Although Chlammy salvages the situation, she is forced to challenge Sora and Shiro to a game. Chlammy later informs Sora, Shiro and Stephanie that she plans to cut ties with the Elves after she wins the game. As Sora and Shiro refuses to withdraw, Chlammy challenges them to a game of live chess, using animated chess pieces. After Sora deduces that charisma and leadership skills affect the gameplay, Shiro is shown to be incapable of sacrificing her chess pieces, losing her knight in the process. Sora takes over and rallies his remaining chess pieces, which gives him an advantage over Chlammy. However, Chlammy is forced to cheat by corrupting Sora's chess pieces. In retaliation, Sora persuades Chlammy's queen to join his side by declaring her king to be corrupt. As Shiro reassures Sora that everything will be okay, Sora comes up with a plan to turn the tables.
4	"Grandmaster" "Gurandomasutā" (国王(グランドマスター))	Chiaki Abe; Keiko Yamamoto	Jukki Hanada	April 30, 2014	
Chlammy is caught off guard when her chess pieces gradually defect to her former queen, and her king is eventually assassinated due to her tyrannical rule. With Sora and Shiro now victorious, Sora denounces Chlammy for her plan to assimilate Imanity with the Elves, telling her not to underestimate Imanity. Three days later, Sora and Shiro are crowned the representative king and queen of Imanity, and they begin resolving political and economical problems in Elkia. At their coronation, Sora and Shiro give a compelling speech before being bestowed the king race piece of Imanity, a chess piece which represents the nation's rights and freewill. At night, Sora and Shiro learn that the Flügel are the sixth ranked angelic race of the Exceed living on the floating nation of Avant Heim. They are visited by Tet, who explains that whoever gathers all sixteen chess pieces from each species will earn the right to challenge him for his title of god. In response, Sora and Shiro accept his challenge, declaring that they will be the winner.
5	"Weak Square" "Wīku Sukuea" (駒並べ(ウィークスクエア))	Maria Ichino; Takashi Nagayoshi	Takashi Aoshima	May 7, 2014	
As Stephanie is fed up with Sora and Shiro delegating their duties to her, Stephanie challenges Sora to a game with the wager of him being a decent person if she wins. Stephanie challenges Sora to a game of blackjack. Sora wins with card counting even when Stephanie attempted to implement false shuffling. After humiliating three aristocrats, Sora uses his wager to dress up Stephanie in a dog costume. However, Stephanie closely resembles one of the Werebeasts, the fourteenth ranked animal-eared race of the Exceed living in the islands of the Eastern Union, who possess superior senses and physical abilities as well as a sixth sense. Stephanie challenges Sora and Shiro to several prediction games, only for the former to lose her dignity each time. As Sora and Shiro exploit Stephanie for not having knowledge in probability, they tell her that there is not enough information about the Werebeasts. Realizing that Sora and Shiro were not fooling around with their duties, Stephanie redirects them to the main library in Elkia, owned by Jibril, the youngest and strongest Flügel.
6	"Interesting" "Intaresutingu" (一手(インタレスティング))	Kunihiko Hamada	Kento Shimoyama	May 14, 2014	
Challenging Jibril to a game for the ownership over the main library, Sora and Shiro wager their tablet computer which contains thousands of valuable ebooks. After Sora fondles Jibril's sensitive wings, Jibril offers her freedom in exchange. They play a game of materialization word chain, where their spoken words will materialize or disappear from the environment, starting with an atomic bomb. During the game of materialization word chain, Sora tells Jibril that Imanity is not as weak as she thinks. Sora and Shiro cleverly and gradually dismantle the planet by removing its outer core, lithosphere and oxygen gas. This leads them to inducing a hypernova by nullifying Coulomb's law. Jibril loses the game of materialization word chain after realizing that Sora and Shiro orchestrated the gameplay from the very beginning. An impressed Jibril solemnly swears her loyalty to Sora and Shiro, who allow Jibril to stay in the main library.
7	"Sacrifice" "Sakurifaisu" (死に手(サクリファイス))	Rie Harada; Kakuto Gai	Takashi Aoshima	May 21, 2014	
Jibril notes that Stephanie was only ordered to fall in love with Sora, not stay in love with him. Meanwhile, Chlammy and Fiel discuss that the quality of life in Elkia has improved. Jibril tells Sora, Shiro and Stephanie about the history of the Werebeasts, which revealed that the Werebeasts have been undefeated for half a century, always wiping the memories of opponents who lost the games. Discovering that Makoto challenged the Werebeasts eight times and lost a large amount of territory in the last decade, Sora denounces Makoto's motives as a king and brings tears to Stephanie's eyes. Upon further investigation at night, Sora sees Shiro as a genuinely pure human as he strives to believe in Makoto's motives. Previously entrusted by Makoto, Stephanie gives Sora a special key, which unlocks a hidden library within Makoto's royal chambers. Sora, Shiro, Stephanie and Jibril discover that Makoto did not have his memories erased, but instead recorded information about the Werebeasts which would be passed on to the next ruler.
8	"Fake End" "Feiku Endo" (起死回生(フェイクエンド))	Shinichi Suzuki; Keiko Yamamoto	Yū Kamiya	May 28, 2014	
Sora, Shiro, Stephanie and Jibril visit the embassy of the Eastern Union, where they meet Ino Hatsuse, the assistant ambassador of the Werebeasts. Inside the embassy, they meet Izuna Hatsuse, Ino's granddaughter and the ambassador of the Werebeasts. Sora and Shiro challenge Ino and Izuna to a game between the nations of Elkia and the Eastern Union for all of the land on the continent. Based on the four games that the Elves lost against the Werebeasts, it is deduced that the Werebeasts made a video game that would allow them to cheat, meaning that the Werebeasts cannot read minds. Threatening to leak this information to the Elves if their challenge is not accepted, Sora and Shiro wager Imanity's king race piece and Elkia's territory. One week later, Sora leaves to accept a challenge on his own. Two days after that, Shiro realizes that Stephanie has no recollection of Sora.
9	"Sky Walk" "Sukai Wōku" (解離法(スカイ・ウォーク))	Masaki Hyuga	Jukki Hanada	June 4, 2014	
As Stephanie believes that Shiro's memories may have been tampered with, Jibril challenges Shiro to a game of chess in order to remove the supposed false memories of Sora. Deciding to hold onto these memories, Shiro wins the game of chess and claims that Sora is indeed real. Shiro realizes that Stephanie and Jibril cannot recall what happened the day after Sora disappeared. After further investigation, Shiro recalls that Sora challenged Chlammy to a game of Othello, where the disks collectively make up their existence. The wager is to manipulate the memories of their respective partners Shiro and Fiel. After Jibril detects magic in the royal chambers, Stephanie trips on two sets of three disks on the floor. Using Sora's three disks, Shiro places each of them on an invisible uncheckered board, thereby winning the game of Othello and restoring Sora's existence. With this victory, Sora shares his memories with Chlammy in order to form an alliance and gains the right to alter Fiel's memories as he pleases.
10	"Blue Rose" "Burū Rōzu" (指向法(ブルー・ローズ))	Maria Ichino; Takashi Nagayoshi; Yumiko Kinoshita	Kento Shimoyama	June 11, 2014	
Chlammy and Fiel formally introduce themselves to Sora, Shiro, Stephanie and Jibril. However, Jibril and Fiel are at odds due to the fact that the former accidentally slaughtered many Elves in Elven Gard during the Great War six thousand years ago. It is revealed that Chlammy's ancestors were slaves to Fiel's ancestors for generations, though Chlammy and Fiel treat each other as equals. Sora tries to convince Chlammy that public bathing is a great way to bond as allies. In the hidden library at night, Chlammy tells Sora that they cannot rely on chance and must avoid making any missteps. The next day, Sora, Shiro, Stephanie and Jibril visit the embassy once again. Before the game begins in the arena, Ino informs an observant public audience that the wager will be Imanity's king race piece and Elkia's territory versus the Eastern Union's entire land. Chlammy and Fiel monitor any trace of cheating. Sora, Shiro, Stephanie and Jibril, as well as their opponent Izuna, are transported to a virtual reality field that resembles Tokyo. Sora and Shiro enter into a devoid state due to their agoraphobia.
11	"Killing Giant" "Kiringu Jaianto" (誘導法(キリング・ジャイアント))	Masaki Hyuga	Kento Shimoyama	June 18, 2014	
Sora and Shiro snap out of their funk after Ino reminds them that they are in a virtual reality field. Ino explains that the challenge will be a game of cops and robbers, where they use lovey-dovey guns that shoot heart-shaped bullets against non-player characters in the form of animal girls. Stephanie remains clueless about the rules of the game. Sora, Shiro and Jibril battle against Izuna, who manages to evade even the most relentless attacks. When Sora, Shiro and Jibril hide under a corridor, it is shown that Ino secretly relayed their location to Izuna. Sora, Shiro, Stephanie and Jibril then regroup in a park, as Shiro makes proper and private adjustments to the plan of action. Executing the unspoken plan of action, it is later revealed that Izuna was tricked into believing that Shiro switched sides, but Shiro threw her shirt button in the trajectory of the bullet instead. Izuna soon finds herself in a dire situation when she is cornered by Sora and Shiro. This forces Izuna to use an ability called Blood Break, which augments her physical capabilities.
12	"Rule Number 10" "Rūru Nanbā Ten" (収束法(ルール・ナンバー・10))	Kōji Ōdate; Kunihiko Hamada	Jukki Hanada	June 25, 2014	
After easily defeating Sora and Shiro, Izuna lets her guard down and is consequently defeated by Stephanie piggybacking on a non-player character. Sora bound Stephanie to the Ten Covenants in order to hide her intent while Shiro calculated the movements of the non-player character in order to hide Stephanie's location. As Ino announces that Elkia won over the Eastern Union, Izuna laments the fate of the Werebeasts, though Sora and Shiro assure Izuna of their goodwill. Later on, the Shrine Maiden, the nameless representative of the Eastern Union, challenges Sora to a game of heads or tails in her shrine. The Shrine Maiden chooses tails as Sora tosses the coin in the air, though the coin lands on its edge. Sora convinces the Shrine Maiden to declare both of them winners. This would allow Elkia to share resources with the Eastern Union while the Shrine Maiden keeps the ability to self-rule the Werebeasts. Sora and Shiro believe that the Ten Covenants would allow them to unite all sixteen races in order to challenge Tet to a game. In the aftermath, Sora and Shiro request the Shrine Maiden to channel an Old Deus, the first ranked godly race of the Exceed, for the next game.

==== No Game No Life Specials ====
No.	English title Original Japanese title	Included In
1	"Wild Fancy" "Wairudo Fanshī" (妄想(ワイルド・ファンシー))	BD Vol. 1
After walking in on them after a bath, Stephanie Dola has a wild fantasy about Sora and Shiro changing each other's clothes using blindfolds. Sora and Shiro are confused after finding her lost in her fantasy.
2	"Director" "Direkutā" (監督(ディレクタ))	BD Vol. 2
During a love scene between Sora and Stephanie, it is shown that Shiro was the director. They complain about her bossing them around and going on a power trip after becoming a director.
3	"Revenge" "Ribenji" (復讐(リベンジ))	BD Vol. 3
For revenge, Stephanie challenges Sora to a game of materialization word chain created by Jibril, but Shiro declares Sora as the winner after he uses tentacles, clothes-dissolving slime, and gooey stuff. Sora then attempts to materialize a perfect girl based on his favorite anime and video game heroines, but it does not work because creating such a girl is impossible, depressing him. Stephanie then begs to be released from the tentacles.
4	"Dressup Doll" "Doresuappu dōru" (人形(ドレスアップ・ドール))	BD Vol. 4
Chlammy Zell is caught in the rain and removes her clothes to dry them. Fiel Nirvalen dresses up Chlammy in various fetish outfits, but Chlammy does not like any of the options. Fiel then uses magic to dry Chlammy's clothes. Chlammy yells at Fiel for not doing that sooner, but accidentally drops her towel.
5	"Growth" "Gurōsu" (成長(グロース))	BD Vol. 5
As Sora is frustrated by the amount of steam in the girls' bath, Shiro, Stephanie, Jibril, Chlammy and Fiel do a brassiere size comparison, which leads Shiro to claim that breasts will grow by massaging them. Fascinated, Fiel and Jibril grab Chlammy and massage her breasts against her will. Sora nearly goes crazy listening to her moans.
6	"Appetite" "Apetaito" (食欲(アぺタイト))	BD Vol. 6
After Jibril feels abandoned when Sora and Shiro are stroking Izuna Hatsuse, Stephanie distracts Izuna with her appetite for doughnuts, leading Sora and Shiro to feel jealous and get back at Stephanie by challenging her to a game, intending to humiliate her.

== Reception ==
It was reported in May 2017 that over three million copies of the light novel are in circulation. That same year, No Game No Life was in the top ten selling light novel series with several of its books appearing in the top thirty selling volumes list. Starting in its 2014 pool, the yearly magazine Kono Light Novel ga Sugoi!, listed the light novel and the protagonists of No Game No Life beginning in its polls; in addition, the series ranked fourth in Sugoi Japan 2015 polls. Seven Seas Entertainment's localization of the manga was able to reach The New York Times Manga Best Sellers and ICv2's charts. The anime series saw similar success and its home media made appearances on Oricon's weekly selling charts. In April 2014, No Game No Life was one of the top recorded anime series on Sony's Torne; a poll by AT-X ranked the series as one of 2014's top anime series.

Anime News Network had four editors review the first episode of the anime: Carl Kiminger, Rebecca Silverman, Theron Martin, and Hope Chapman. Opinions summarized: Kimlinger enjoyed the premise and the concepts of games as battles; Silverman and Martin disliked the characters; and Chapman expressed absolute disdain, writing "nothing has made me roll my eyes, gag, or feel more irrationally angry this season than this insulting self-insert pandering trash heap". Carl Kimlinger continued the series, and published a positive review for the anime. He wrote that the premise presented many flaws but were balanced out by other aspects: Sora and Shiro's "over-powered hero" archetype is balanced out by their flawed lifestyles, motives, and their "visible delight in crushing their enemies"; Stephanie Dola's mistreatment with gags and Sora and Shiro's growing respect towards her; and the harem aspect with Sora's apathy and interesting female characters. Regardless, Kimlinger praised the plot's "big games", calling them the reason to watch the series and described them as "steeped in trickery and strategy"; he added that despite knowing the protagonists would win, the fun is seeing how they do it. Kimlinger wrote the over-saturation art style will be an acquired taste for most viewers and praised how the animation really shines during the "big games", calling it an impressive display of fluidity and timing.

Kotaku's Richard Eisenbeis was also positive towards the series, praising the protagonists' dynamic, echoed Kimlinger's sentiments about the games, liked the animation, but noted his dislike for fan service featuring Shiro. He also ranked the series as one of the top five anime series of 2014, and recommended it for viewers who like smart characters and gamer humor. IGN praised the character dynamics and questioned the amount of fan service.

In August 2022, it was reported that Saint Petersburg banned No Game No Life in Russia due to child pornography scenes.

== Notes and references ==
=== Explanatory notes ===
- ^LN represents the Light Novel of the series in the format of X.Y, where X represents the volume and Y represents the chapter. Chapter A represents the afterword of the novel; Chapter 0 represents the prologue; and Chapter E represents the epilogue.
