= Shizuka (band) =

Japanese rock band

Shizuka: 静香; 靜香
- Three of Shizuka's former members. From left to right: Maki Miura, Shizuka Miura, Jun Kosugi.

Background information
- Origin: Tokyo, Japan
- Genres: Psychedelic; folk; noise rock; neo-psychedelia
- Years active: 1992–2010
- Labels: PSF; Persona Non Grata; Last Visible Dog; Fra, Inc.; An'archives
- Past members: Shizuka Miura; Maki Miura; Jun Kosugi; Tomoya Hirata; Tetsuya "Seven" Mugishima; (See members section for others)

Shizuka (静香(しずか); /ʃiːzuːkɑː/; Japanese pronunciation: [ɕizɯᵝka̠]) was a Japanese rock band formed in Tokyo in 1992. (Note: Chinese: 靜香：開始創作音樂大約是在一九九二年。; trans. "Shizuka: The beginning of my music creation was in about 1992.") The group made atmospheric, psychedelic-noise music, and was regarded for its distinctive style in the Tokyo psychedelic music scene. The band produced four albums in its eighteen years of existence and constantly performed live shows, (Note: Chinese: 以唱片發行數而言，靜香的創作量稱不上豐富，但從未間斷的現場演出代表他們對自身藝術的堅持，稀少的錄音作品因此顯得彌足珍貴。; trans. "In terms of the number of records released, Shizuka's volume of creation is not rich, but the uninterrupted live performances represent their adherence to their own art, so the rare recording works appear precious.") but they remained little-documented and little-known.

In 1992, Shizuka Miura (vocals and rhythm guitar) began composing music and performing by herself, (Note: Chinese: 真樹：最初的三場演出，包括租場地、演唱、彈奏等等，都是由靜香一人獨自完成的。; trans. "Maki: The first three performances, including renting, singing, playing and so on, were done by Shizuka alone.") (Note: Chinese: 約十年前她在丈夫三浦真樹（一個擁有豐富樂團經歷的老練樂手）的協助下開始創作音樂……; trans. "About a decade ago, with the help of her husband Maki Miura (a seasoned musician with rich orchestra experience), she began to create music [...]") but she soon formed a duo with Maki Miura (lead guitar). (Note: Chinese: 真樹：……第三次我受邀看她的演出，結果非常好……於是靜香與我便以雙人組的型態展開活動。; trans. "Maki: [...] The third time I was invited to see her performance, the result was very good. To my surprise, she had a kind of originality from her own. So Shizuka and I began some activities in the form of a double group.") Early members also included Jun Kosugi (drums) (Note: Chinese: 真樹：……在一開始時，小杉是鼓手……; trans. "Maki: [...] At the beginning, Kosugi was the drummer [...]") and Tomoya Hirata (bass), and later the band was established with Tetsuya "Seven" Mugishima (bass) who replaced the first bassist. (Note: Chinese: 真樹：……然後第一個貝斯手也加入了，不過他跟不上我們的步伐，bass line得由我來寫。這是個大問題，因為我們習慣在錄音室裡現場完成編曲。在第一張錄音室專輯發行後，我們認識了SevenZ，他原本是個吉他手，不過當起貝斯手來也十分稱職，而且能夠寫出很漂亮的bass line，我們便邀請他加入樂團，於是原初的「靜香」團隊在一九九五年正式結成。; trans. "Maki: [...] then the first bass player joined, but he couldn't keep up with us, so the bass line had to be written by myself. This is a big problem, because we are used to do the arrangement in the studio. When the first studio album was released, we met SevenZ. He was a guitarist, but he's also a pretty good bass player and could write beautifully bass line, so we invited him to join the band. So the original Shizuka (band) team was formally formed in 1995.") The group had many lineup changes throughout its history, having been Shizuka and Maki the only permanent members up until Shizuka's death in early 2010.

Shizuka's musical style incorporated elements of psychedelic music, folk music, noise rock, and acid rock, combined atmospheric music with the Japanese neo-psychedelia, and was led by Shizuka's vocals and Maki's guitar. Shizuka's vocals were slow, chanted, haunting, and tremulous—characteristics that connoted sadness and a "gothic atmosphere". Maki's guitar complemented Shizuka's vocals in a gentle plucking of strings, but intermixed a psychedelic-noise guitar playing in contrast to the melodic and serene proceedings.

Of Shizuka's four albums, Heavenly Persona (天界のペルソナ, Tenkai no Perusona) (1994) was the band's debut and only studio album. The other three were live albums: Live Shizuka (1995); Tokyo Underground '95 (2000); and Traditional Aesthetics (伝承美学, Denshō Bigaku) (2008). They also released two video albums: Shizuka (静香) in 1995, and Endless Dream (終わりのない夢, Owari no Nai Yume) in 2010. Posthumous releases include Paradise of Delusion (妄想の楽園, Mousou no Rakuen) (2021).

== History ==
=== 1992–1994: Early years ===
In circa 1992, Shizuka Miura started making music with support from Maki Miura (a veteran musician and former member of Fushitsusha and Les Rallizes Dénudés) (Note: Chinese: ──（對真樹）除了「靜香」以外，你還加入過哪些樂團？真樹：最有名的是Les Rallizes DeNudes和不失者（註四），另外我和Friction（註五）的前吉他手Lapis一起做過音樂，還有很多其它的……比如說DJ Krush，我也和他合作過。; trans. "(to Maki) Besides Shizuka (band), which bands have you joined? Maki: The most famous are Les Rallizes Dénudés and Fushitsusha. I also did music with Lapis, the former guitarist of Friction. There are many other artists... For example, DJ Krush, I worked with him.") who had adapted a poem of hers to music which prompted Shizuka into learning music composition. (Note: Chinese: 真樹：然後有次我為她的一首詩譜曲，她見到我寫歌的過程，似乎從中學會了寫歌的方法，漸漸能夠獨立創作音樂。; trans. "Maki: Then once I wrote music for one of her poems, she saw me writing songs, and seemed to learn how to write songs, and she gradually become able to create music independently.") Shizuka initially wrote three songs (Note: "The Burial of a Shooting Star" (流れ星の埋葬, Nagareboshi no Maisō), "Pandora's Box" (パンドラの匣, Pandora no Hako), and "Fault" (あやまち, Ayamachi). (Note: Chinese: ──最初寫下的三首歌是什麼？靜香：〈流れ星の埋葬〉、〈パンドラの匣〉、和〈あやまち〉。; trans. "What were the three songs that she originally wrote? Shizuka: "The Burial of a Shooting Star" (流れ星の埋葬, Nagareboshi no Maisō), "Pandora's Box" (パンドラの匣, Pandora no Hako), and "Fault" (あやまち, Ayamachi).")) that she used for the first (Note: Chinese: 靜香：那三首歌就是我首次演出的曲目。; trans. "Shizuka: Those three songs are my first performance.") of three concerts she independently organized and performed in. Maki attended the third performance of hers and had positive impressions of it, which led to Shizuka and Maki forming a musical duo.

Fushitsusha drummer Jun Kosugi was an early member of the group. In circa September 1993, they appeared in the Tokyo Flashback 3 with the song "Glass Ribbon Unraveled" (ほどかれた娥羅子のリボン, Hodokareta Gara-shi no Ribon). With this formation and additionally bassist Tomoya Hirata, Shizuka performed at live house Manda-La2 in Tokyo on 8 November 1993. On 12 August 1994, they played at Japan's Studio AMS. Both performances were self-released in circa 1995 with the title Shizuka (静香).

=== 1994: Heavenly Persona ===
On 22 November 1994, Shizuka's debut and only studio album, Heavenly Persona (天界のペルソナ, Tenkai no Perusona), was released in Japan by PSF Records. It was conceptualized by Shizuka Miura and dedicated to Japanese dollmaker Katan Amano. (Note: Chinese: 靜香：……我們的首張專輯《天界のペルソナ》的重要性之一，便在於它是獻給可淡的。; trans. "Shizuka: [...] One of the importance of our first album Heavenly Persona (天界のペルソナ, Tenkai no Perusona) is that it is dedicated to Katan Amano.") (Note: Katan Amano was Shizuka Miura's dollmaking mentor. She died at the age of 37 on 1 November 1990 "due to a motorcycle accident". (Note: Japanese: 今から17年前の1990年の11月1日午前11時10分。不世出のドールアーティスト天野可淡がバイク事故によってこの世を去りました。享年37歳。)) Reception-wise, Mason Jones reviewed Heavenly Persona as a "beautiful CD" and "very fine album", and Steven Lowenthal and Peter Kolovos wrote on NPR that Heavenly Persona "features some of the most straightforward—yet equally magical—music within the PSF catalog".

Musically, Heavenly Persona opens with a harsh-noise psychedelic jam led by Maki Miura's distorted guitar, but soon after the album introduces the band's atmospheric, traditional folk style led by Shizuka's chanted and plaintive vocals, and Maki's delicate string plucking. The album features piano by Ichirou Nagahara and cello by Takeharu Hayakawa that enhance the "simplistic arrangements of guitar and voice". This release also presents Shizuka's characteristic music contrast on the initially serene, melancholic melodies that develop into crescendos led by Maki's psychedelic solos.

=== 1995: Live Shizuka and miscellaneous appearance ===
In 1995, Shizuka's first CD live album, Live Shizuka, was released in the United States by New Yorker record label Persona Non Grata. In this release, the band maintained atmosphere akin to 4AD releases with further yet meticulous use of guitar effects and noise (Note: Chinese: 在九五年的《Live Shizuka》中，吉他噪音的運用得到進一步的開發，整體的迷幻味大增，更展現出其現場表演的實力。; trans. "In "Live Shizuka", released in 1995, the use of guitar noise was further developed, and the overall psychedelic flavor increased greatly, showing the strength of its live performance.") that distinguished the group's musical style from the Japanese neo-psychedelia. Shizuka was responsible for the vocals and guitar, Maki for the lead guitar, Jun for the drums, Tomoya for the bass, and Amano Onkyo Giken for the recording engineering.

Also in 1995, Shizuka appeared in the compilation album of various artists Tokyo Flashback 4, released by PSF Records. It is the album's sixth track, named "A Song for the World Left Behind" (世に残す歌, Yo ni Nokosu Uta). In the music production of this song, the band completed all the arrangement in a single-take, contrasting the group's usual creative process, which was to initially "listen to Shizuka singing the lyrics, jam together", and only then "arrange the song". (Note: Chinese: 真樹：通常我們的創作過程是先聽靜香將詞曲唱過，一起jam看看，再花些時間想想怎麼編曲。不過在做〈世に殘す歌〉時，彷彿每一個音符已事先找到它的位置般，整個編曲在first take中很順利地就完成了。; trans. "Maki: Usually our creative process is to listen to Shizuka sing the lyrics once, jam together, and then spend some time thinking about how to arrange the songs. However, while composing "A Song for the World Left Behind" (世に残す歌, Yo ni Nokosu Uta), it was if each note had found its place in advance, and the whole arrangement was completed smoothly in the first take.") For this piece, Shizuka Miura said she used texts from the Japanese epic poem Hotsuma Tsutae as lyrics to complete the song. (Note: Chinese: 靜香：……後來我讀到《ほつまつたえ（世に殘す歌）》，一本關於日本神祇的文學作品，發現其中有段文字跟主旋律非常契合，便以這段文字當作歌詞完成這首歌。; trans. "Shizuka: [...] Later I read "Hotsuma Tsutae", a literary work about Japanese gods, and found that there is a paragraph of the text that suits the main melody very well, so I finished the song with these words as the lyrics.")

In 17 and 18 June 1995, Shizuka Miura and Maki Miura performed live with Takashi Mizutani at Art Gallery Hasegawa, Tokyo. Shizuka released video recordings of this performance as Alkaloid Serenade (アルカロイド小夜曲, Arukaroido Shōyakyoku).

=== 1995–1997: Lineup changes, and American tour ===
Maki Miura told that Shizuka's first bass player "couldn't keep up with" the band members' pace, having Maki himself to write the songs' bass lines. He also said that situation became a major problem for the band, since its members were "used to completing the arrangement in the [recording] studio". Sometime after the release of Heavenly Persona in 1994, singer Shizuka, Maki, and Jun met Japanese musician Tetsuya Mugishima, also known as "Seven". Even though Seven originally was a guitarist, he was invited to be the bassist on Shizuka for his competency as a bass player and skills in composing bass lines. With Seven's joining, the band was formally established.

In 1995, the band did three live performances with that formation. One was at live venue ShowBoat in Kōenjikita on 20 July 1995. Another was at live venue Namba Bears in City of Osaka on 10 September 1995. Both performances were recorded and later released on the CD format in 2000 and 2008, respectively. The remaining show was at the La Mama venue in Shibuya on 17 September 1995. After those three live shows, Seven, and soon afterwards Jun Kosugi, left the band for "personal reasons". This led to many lineup changes and to a decline in the group's activities. Despite these events, Maki said they had "never disbanded", and were waiting for Seven and Kosugi to rejoin the band since they preferred that formation. (Note: Chinese: 真樹：我們從沒解散過，直到現在始終持續進行著。……於是原初的「靜香」團隊在一九九五年正式結成。但是不久後SevenZ和小杉因為私人理由先後脫退，之後我們又換了幾次成員，但始終覺得原本的成員是最好的，所以一直在等他們回來。; trans. "Maki: We have never dissolved, and we continue to do so. [...] So the original Shizuka (band) team was formally formed in 1995. But soon after SevenZ and then Kosugi left for personal reasons. Then we changed members several times, but always felt that the original members were the best, so we had been waiting for them to come back.")

Sometime between 1995 and 1997, Mason Jones helped organizing a tour in the United States for the band. There were shows in San Francisco and Los Angeles. They went twice to a local radio station, one of which was a live performance. Both Shizuka and Maki told they had positive experiences with the audience in the USA, with Shizuka adding that there were many fans in San Francisco. (Note: Chinese: 靜香：……我們去了洛杉磯和舊金山，舊金山那邊有許多歌迷，觀眾的整體反應也相當好。此外我們還去了當地的廣播電台兩次，其中一次在電台做了現場表演。相較於日本的觀眾，美國的觀眾在反應上比較主動而熱烈。真樹：所有的觀眾都隨著音樂起舞，這讓我很開心（笑）。; trans. "Shizuka: [...] We went to Los Angeles and San Francisco, where there were a lot of fans and the audience responded very well. In addition, we went to the local radio station twice, one of which we made a live performance on the radio station. Compared with the Japanese audience, the American audience is more active and enthusiastic. Maki: All the audience danced to the music, which made me happy (laugh).")

On 15 July 1996, Shizuka had its song "Bloodstained Blossom" (血まみれの華, Chimamire no Hana) from Heavenly Persona released in the United Kingdom in the compilation album Tokyo Invasion! Volume 1: Cosmic Kurushi Monsters by Virgin Records.

On 22 April 1997, Shizuka's song "Kimi no Sora" (君の空) was released in the compilation album Land of the Rising Noise, Vol. 2 in the United States by independent record label Charnel Music, owned by Mason Jones. The cover art of this various artists album features a doll made by Shizuka Miura.

=== 2000–2002: Reunition, Tokyo Underground '95, and Le Weekend festival ===
In 2000, the group reunited with the previously established members: Shizuka, Maki, Jun, and Seven. In that year, they released a live album recorded in 1995 during a 40-minute performance in a Tokyo nightclub, titled Tokyo Underground 20, Jul '95, which was published in the United States by the American label Last Visible Dog. As Shizuka's previous albums, Tokyo Underground '95 (Note: This album was reissued by the same label in circa 2003 as Tokyo Underground '95.) maintains the band's melancholic and contrasting music style, with Shizuka's chanted vocals, and Maki's psychedelic guitar solos. However, this album has different characteristics in relation to other Shizuka releases: it starts with a 1-minute recording of a live PA by a previous artist, and, as described by Eclipse Records, the "disc gives off a slightly different 'in a nightclub' aura to Shizuka's zoned-out balladry".

In circa October or November 2001, The Wire magazine invited the band to play at the Le Weekend festival in Stirling, Scotland. (Note: Chinese: 靜香：今年十月或十一月，我們將應The Wire雜誌之邀到蘇格蘭參加一個他們舉辦的音樂節。; trans. "Shizuka: In October or November this year, we will be invited by The Wire magazine to go to Scotland for a music festival they're holding.") In this way, Shizuka was scheduled to play at 19:30 on 25 April 2002 at the Stirling Tolbooth music venue. There, they faced some problems: Maki had stomach related health issues; and immigration-wise to get into Scotland because Shizuka members' identities were under suspicion. Nevertheless, the band made it to the Tolbooth "with a last-minute appearance", and became the first artist to perform in the 2002 edition of that festival.

=== 2008: Traditional Aesthetics ===
On 25 April 2008, a performance by Shizuka from September 1995 at Namba Bears was released in Japan by PSF Records as a live album, titled Traditional Aesthetics (伝承美学, Denshō Bigaku). As characteristics of Shizuka's musical style, the songs in Traditional Aesthetics are simple. They feature a slow tempo, Shizuka singing elegies in plaintive, chanted, and tuneless vocals, and Maki's psychedelic guitar playing. Members in this recording are Shizuka (vocals and guitar), Maki (lead guitar), Jun (drums), and Seven (bass).

=== 2010: Shizuka Miura's death, and Owari no Nai Yume ===
On circa 31 January 2010, Shizuka Miura died. As a tribute to Shizuka, a concert of the band performing at ShowBoat on 30 December 2008 was released on the DVD-video format by PSF Records on 25 April 2010: Endless Dream (終わりのない夢, Owari no Nai Yume). Members in Owari no Nai Yume are Shizuka (vocals, guitar), Maki (lead guitar), Kazuhide Yamaji (bass), and Katsumi Honjo (drums).

=== 2017–present: Posthumous releases ===
On 24 May 2017, a live recording from March 2009 at Kameido Hardcore of the song "Lunatic Pearl" (気の真珠, Ki no Shinju) was included by Super Fuji Discs on a various artists compilation: Tokyo Flashback: P.S.F. — Psychedelic Speed Freaks. The American label Black Editions later reissued it in 2019.

In February 2018, the Bandcamp Daily published that Black Editions will reissue a remastered version of Heavenly Persona, having been the music producer Kris Lapke "enlisted to remaster" it.

In June 2021, French label An'archives released a new Shizuka live album titled Paradise of Delusion (妄想の楽園, Mousou no Rakuen) that had been announced in 2019. It is a double-sided vinyl with a total of 8 tracks taken from a previously unreleased live recording in 2001.

== Musical style ==
Shizuka's musical style features simple arrangements, going from serene and melancholic traditional folk to the Japanese psychedelic harsh noise—a characteristic contrast present in their recordings which commonly develops into crescendos. It is led primarily by Shizuka's vocals and Maki's guitar: Shizuka's vocals are chanted, slow, monotone, and plaintive—often connoting sadness, while Maki's guitar is characterized both by a simple, delicate string plucking, and by emotive distorted psychedelic-noise solos as influences from Maki's previous works in acts like Fushitsusha and Les Rallizes Dénudés. The band's sound and atmosphere is comparable to releases on 4AD.

Shizuka was described as distinctive by music journalist Alan Cummings and reviewer Andrea Moed, and as unique by reviewer Dean McFarlane, specially to the Japanese neo-psychedelia. This is attributable to the band's meticulous use of guitar effects while also featuring psychedelic-noise in contrast to Shizuka's haunting, madrigal-resembling vocals. Shizuka's vocals were imperfect and tuneless, but these aspects added an emotional edge as part of the band's style.

== Members ==
=== Former members ===
- Shizuka Miura (三浦静香) — vocals, guitar (1992–2010), bells (1994)
- Maki Miura (三浦真樹) — guitar (1992–2010)
- Jun Kosugi (小杉淳) — drums (1992–c. 1997, 2000–c. 2002)
- Tomoya Hirata (平田知也) — bass (1992–1995)
- Tetsuya "Seven" Mugishima (麦島徹也) — bass (1995, 2000–2002)

=== Guest and session musicians ===
- Takeharu Hayakawa (早川岳晴) — bass, cello (1994)
- Ichirou Nagahara (長原一郎) — piano (1994)
- Takashi Mizutani (水谷孝) — guitar (1995)
- Junko Hiroshige (純子) — bass (1997)
- Kazuhide Yamaji (ヤマジカズヒデ) — guitar (2000), bass (2002, 2008–2009)
- Yasushi Nagata (永田也寸志) — guitar (2001)
- Katsumi Honjo (本庄克己) — drums (2008–2009)

== Discography ==
Studio albums

- Heavenly Persona (天界のペルソナ, Tenkai no Perusona) (1994)

Live albums

- Live Shizuka (1995)
- Tokyo Underground 20, Jul '95 (2000)
- Traditional Aesthetics (伝承美学, Denshō Bigaku) (2008)
- Paradise of Delusion (妄想の楽園, Mousou no Rakuen) (2021)

Video albums

- Shizuka (静香) (c. 1995)
  - Hikyoku no Seiseki: Live at Manda-La2 1993 & Studio Ams 1994 (秘曲の成績) (2009, reissue)
- Endless Dream (終わりのない夢, Owari no Nai Yume) (2010)
