= List of No Game No Life characters =

This is a list of characters of the light novel series No Game No Life.

Left to right: Sora, Shiro, Stephanie Dola, Jibril and Chlammy Zell as they appear in the anime

== Main characters ==
Sora (空) and Shiro (白)
Voiced by: Yoshitsugu Matsuoka (Sora), Ai Kayano (Shiro) (Japanese); Scott Gibbs (Sora), Caitlynn French (Shiro) (English)
Sora and Shiro are the main protagonists of the series and are stepsiblings. While Sora is an eighteen-year-old boy who excels at strategies and cold readings, Shiro is an eleven-year-old girl who excels at calculations and logic.^{LN 3.0} The two form the undefeated gaming identity Blank (空白, Kūhaku; stylized as『 』) due to their trademark of using only spaces as their in-game names. After their parents died, the two no longer had emotional ties to society and eventually became agoraphobic hikikomori.^{LN 1.0} When the two are separated from each other, they begin to suffer panic attacks.^{LN 1.1} After Sora and Shiro are summoned to Disboard, they decide to uphold their undefeated reputation as Blank by defeating Tet. A 2014 poll by Charapedia ranked Shiro and Sora as two of the most intelligent anime characters of all time.

== Supporting characters ==
Stephanie Dola (ステファニー・ドーラ, Sutefanī Dōra)
Voiced by: Yoko Hikasa (Japanese); Sara Ornelas (English)
Stephanie is a teenage girl and granddaughter to the previous king of Elkia, the nation inhabited by humans. She has a lot of explicit knowledge. Unlike Sora and Shiro, she lacks the intuition to win games.^{LN 2.1} Her grandfather was infamous for recklessly losing games and giving up almost all of Elkia's land for seemingly nothing in return. Consequently, Stephanie strives to restore the honor of her grandfather and humanity. When Sora and Shiro are crowned king and queen of Elkia, she becomes their assistant and handles Elkia's economics and politics behind the scenes. They later discover that her grandfather kept hidden records on the other species' games. These records become critical to their victories.^{LN 2.3} Eventually, her experience with Sora and Shiro improves her skill to the point that she can win games against almost all normal humans.^{LN 4.1} She has a pivotal role in the game between the Commonwealth of Elkia and Holou, accompanying Sora and Shiro throughout the entire game and risking her life alongside them, even through the minigame with Jibril.^{LN 8.2} However, it is revealed that the Steph accompanying the two of them in that game is actually a clone, created by the Old Deus to be passed off as a "traitor"; the real Steph waited in the Eastern Union through most of that game before delivering Laila to the side-game between Ino Hatsuse, Plum, Chlammy and Fiel.^{LN 8.3} Although she takes pride in the fact that Sora and Shiro only prevented her from playing in the Old Deus game due to her trustworthiness, she still feels jealous that she had to miss out.
Jibril (ジブリール, Jiburīru)
Voiced by: Yukari Tamura (Japanese); Amelia Fischer (English)
Jibril is a Flügel, (Note: 天翼種, Furyūgeru) a powerful angelic race known for their ruthlessness.^{LN 2.1} Jibril is over 6,000 years old and is the youngest and most powerful of her species.^{LN 5.2} Towards the end of the ancient Great War, she encountered and fought an Ex-Machina named Schwi, whose strange actions she was unable to comprehend at that time; due to this, she overexerted herself and thus was not present for the final battle.^{LN 6.4} Since then, unsatisfied with Flügel's stagnation and curious about many things (such as the strange happenings at the end of the War), she fled her homeland;^{LN 5.3} she won Elkia's library from Stephanie's grandfather and uses it to store her books and as a home.^{LN 2.2} After losing to Sora and Shiro in a game of materialization word chain, she becomes their slave, but is treated as an equal.^{LN 2.2} She often provides magic or transportation for the protagonists. Later on, she begins publishing novels based on Sora and Shiro, which makes them famous among the Flügel.^{LN 5.1} Although she continually rebuffs her elder Azril's affection for her and claims she considers her a nuisance, she risks her life to attempt to get Azril to understand the true reason for Flügel's loss in the war, even bluffing for the first time in her life.^{LN 5.2} She enters the game against an Old Deus alongside Sora and Shiro, intending on using the game's unique rules to force her masters into a simulation of the Great War;^{LN 8.1} however, she panics and becomes desperate upon realizing that a quirk in the game's rules is causing her to lose her memory, even forgetting entirely about Sora and Shiro. Distraught and terrified, she forces the two plus Steph into her game with a penalty of death for the loser, intending to discover the secrets behind the end of the War before her death,^{LN 7.E} although she despises herself for doing so. Still, Sora and Shiro outmaneuver her in her game, convincing her that it's okay to be afraid but not acceptable to sacrifice someone, and accomplishing a default - losing the task in the Old Deus game by timing out in Jibril's game, and leaving Jibril vacantly happy yet mostly memoryless for a time.^{LN 8.2} Since her game with them became Blank's first true loss in a game, she has doubled down on her efforts to be useful to them, being remorseful of her actions^{LN 9.3} and insecure about her place at their side,^{LN 9.2} although they do not blame her, only having chagrin at losing.^{LN 8.2}

Chlammy Zell (クラミー・ツェル, Kuramī Tseru) and Fiel Nirvalen (フィール・ニルヴァレン, Fīru Niruvaren)
Voiced by: Yuka Iguchi (Chlammy), Mamiko Noto (Fiel) (Japanese); Kara Greenberg (Chlammy), Christina Stroup (Fiel) (English)
Chlammy is an eighteen-year-old girl and considered the slave of the Elf, Fiel. Chlammy appears cold and cunning, but she is actually a bit of a crybaby. Though Chlammy's family were the Nirvalen family's slaves for generations, her relationship with Fiel is similar to daughter and mother.^{LN 3.2} Meanwhile, Fiel is considered a failure of a magician but is secretly highly skilled.^{LN 5.0} She is willing to betray Elven Gard, (Note: エルヴン・ガルド, Eruvun Garudo) the nation inhabited by Elves, for Chlammy's sake; the two conspire to have Fiel obtain a political position of power in order to abolish slavery.^{LN 3.2} Chlammy attempts to take control of the human nation of Elkia as part of this plan, although despite employing Elven magic to cheat, Sora and Shiro still defeat her to take the throne themselves.^{LN 1.3} Upon hearing that Sora and Shiro plan to bet the human Race Piece (Note: 種のコマ, Shu no Koma) (a chess piece representing all of the rights of a race under the Ten Covenants) in a game, Chlammy challenges Sora to another game with their respective memories on the line; Sora wins, managing to convince Chlammy to be his ally by sharing his memories with her.^{LN 3.1} After striving to undermine a single state of Elven Gard,^{LN 5.0} Chlammy and Fiel blockade the Eastern Union in order to interfere with Elkia's game with Holou.^{LN 7.3} They attempt to use the Shrine Maiden's temporary absence to take control of the Eastern Union, although Plum turns their plan to his own benefit for a time,^{7.4} and ultimately they are forced to enter a game at a disadvantage due to the timely arrival of Laila forcing Plum to cooperate with the Eastern Union.^{8.2} Plum's magic, temporarily uninhibited due to Holou, overpowers Fiel's while Ino defeats Chlammy with his Blood Break in their game.^{8.3} Due to their loss, Chlammy and Fiel's state of Elven Gard comes under control of the Commonwealth of Elkia and Sora reveals that he betrayed their treason to the Elves, causing the two to join Elkia.^{LN 8.E}

== Werebeasts ==
The Werebeasts (Note: 獣人種, Wābīsuto) are an animal-eared race with high physical abilities; their nation is known as the Eastern Union (Note: 東部連合, Tōbu Rengō).

Shrine Maiden (巫女, Miko)
Voiced by: Naomi Shindo (Japanese); Suzelle Palacios (English)
The Shrine Maiden is the nameless representative of the Werebeasts and ruler over the Eastern Union. She is a logical woman who helped the Eastern Union flourish for the past fifty years.^{LN 3.4} She possesses a rare ability called Blood Break, which augments her physical abilities by taxing her body. She allies herself with Sora and Shiro, who promise benefits for humanity and Werebeasts.^{LN 3.4} In her youth, Werebeasts inhabited disparate tribes and fought constantly against each other; her own name was lost forever when her Golden Fox tribe was defeated.^{LN 7.0} Seeking to put an end to the Werebeasts' infighting, she tricked and bound an Old Deus (later her first friend and ally) inside her body, and went on to unite the Werebeast tribes into the Eastern Union;^{LN 8.4} unable to wield the Old Deus's powers directly, she instead channeled them as a power source for the nation's advanced technology.^{LN 7.3} Although she used to dream of creating a world without violence, as she grew up she became disillusioned and gave up on her dream until she meets Sora and Shiro, who she believes could actually finish her dream. Trusting in them, she tricks and defeats the Old Deus again, forcing her into a game with Sora and Shiro,^{LN 8.4} in which the Shrine Maiden is apparently killed; however, the Old Deus keeps her alive throughout by maintaining her soul with magic.^{LN 7.2} Although the Old Deus is defeated, joins the Commonwealth of Elkia, and yet still considers the Shrine Maiden important to her, the Shrine Maiden feels somewhat guilty and unworthy of the god in light of her betrayals.^{LN 8.E}
Izuna Hatsuse (初瀬 いづな, Hatsuse Izuna)
Voiced by: Miyuki Sawashiro (Japanese); Kira Vincent-Davis (English)
Izuna is an eight-year-old child who is the ambassador of the Kingdom of Elkia.^{LN 2.4} She has a childlike demeanor and mistakenly assumes the copula desu (alternatively, the adverb please) itself makes a sentence polite, and says it at the end of every sentence regardless of the sentence's actual politeness. She also possesses high intellect and is capable of using Blood Break.^{LN 3.3} Following the alliance between humans and Werebeasts, she is a constant companion to Sora and Shiro, whom she adores and trusts. She aids Steph in discovering the true rules for Laila's game, using her enhanced senses and her Blood Break to quickly identify books relating to the Siren.^{LN 5.3} While preparing for their next game, Izuna stumbles across Tet - collapsed on the ground in urban Elkia, under the guise of a human - and listens to him as he tells her the story of Riku, Schwi, and the end of the ancient great war.^{LN 6.0} She is then a major player in the game with Holou^{LN 7.1} and is actually the first to advance to the home stretch,^{LN 7.E} although she is unable to answer Holou's question and thus is unable to finish the game.^{LN 8.2}
Ino Hatsuse (初瀬 いの, Hatsuse Ino)
Voiced by: Mugihito (Japanese); John Swasey (English)
Ino is Izuna's grandfather.^{LN 2.4} He is a former politician and has been a key ally to the Shrine Maiden for many years, although he never realized the secret behind her strength until much later.^{LN 7.3} He believes Sora has selfish ulterior motives, disliking and distrusting him; he also tends to be adversarial with beings of other races in general, especially Jibril, with whom the Werebeast race had clashed in the past. After the alliance between humans and Werebeasts, he works alongside Stephanie to formalize the Commonwealth of Elkia, bonding with her over their shared misfortune at the hands of Sora and Shiro.^{LN 4.1} He provides assistance during the game with Laila at Oceand, utilizing his idiosyncratic ways with women to attempt to seduce her; however, he fails, falling under control of the Sirens.^{LN 4.4} After being rescued from Oceand, he participates in the game against Holou, although once he sees that the Shrine Maiden has apparently died at the start of the game, he loses all control, failing to grasp the hidden points in the game's rules and instead going on a single-minded crusade against Sora, who he blames for her "death".^{LN 7.1} He eventually realizes the extent of his failure, after which he intentionally loses in order to aid Sora, Shiro and Steph.^{LN 7.3} However, losing does not kill him like he expected, but causes him to continue existing as a ghost; in this form he is accosted by Fiel and Chlammy, who threaten him into a game, staking a state of Elven Gard for the entire Eastern Union.^{LN 7.3} Plum also intervenes in this game in order to win concessions for Dhampir, but his plan is overturned and he and Ino together achieve victory over Chlammy and Fiel, causing Ino to regard Plum as a proper ally for the first time.^{LN 8.3}

== Dhampirs and Sirens ==
Dhampirs (Note: 吸血種, Danpīru) are a species with similar characteristics to vampires: they drink body fluids from other species for nourishment; excel at transformation, illusion, and dream magic; and are weak to sunlight. Their weakness to sunlight can be spread through bites which deters the other species from sharing blood with them.^{LN 4.0} Meanwhile, Sirens (Note: 海棲種, Sērēn) are an all female species with the body of a mermaid. They require the life of a male from another species in order to reproduce; their magic allows them to seduce anyone of their choosing. Both species live in a nation called Oceand (Note: オーシェンド, Ōshendo). Centuries ago, the Dhampirs and Sirens used the Ten Covenants to create a mutual relationship between the two; the dhampirs were allowed to feed on the sirens and in return, a male Dhampir is to mate with the queen of the Sirens who can reproduce without killing. Eight hundred years prior, the queen went into hibernation and the mating rituals killed all but a single male Dhampir.^{LN 4.1}

Plum Stoker (プラム・ストーカー, Puramu Sutōkā)
Plum is the last living male Dhampir and their leader, and he disguises himself as a female as a result;^{LN 5.4} his magic skills are considered above average within his species.^{LN 5.2} After consuming Sora and Shiro's sweat, he becomes fond of their taste. He makes a deal with the Sirens to lure Sora and Shiro in an attempt to have one of the two races enslave humanity. Sora and Shiro deduce his deception but decide to save both races regardless.^{LN 5.4} Since then, he has sometimes accompanied Sora and Shiro on their adventures. Alongside the two of them, Ino, Izuna, Jibril and Steph, he visits the Eastern Union capital to challenge an Old Deus to a game;^{LN 6.E} although he becomes unable to finish the game due to it requiring extensive travel across open terrain in broad daylight, his soul is maintained by the Old Deus and thus he does not die from losing, instead persisting as a ghost with unlimited access to his magical powers. He uses his magic to intervene in the side-game between Ino and the team of Chlammy and Fiel, forcing both parties into the game despite also upping the ante in an attempt to gain a foothold for the Dhampir race from which they might seek emancipation from the Sirens.^{LN 7.4} However, then Laila arrives at their game, forcing Plum to retract his demands and fight with Ino for the Eastern Union, since he is unable to sacrifice Laila without dooming his own race.^{LN 8.2} Despite his plans being crushed by Sora and Shiro's machinations once again, he fights for the Eastern Union and is victorious, overpowering Fiel in a magic battle.^{LN 8.3}

Laila Lorelei (ライラ・ローレライ, Raira Rōrerai) and Amila (アミラ, Amira)
Laila is the queen of the Sirens who used the Ten Covenants to put herself to sleep without revealing the requirements to wake her up. While Laila sleeps, Amila takes her place in leading the Sirens.^{LN 4.2} Realizing that Laila is a masochist who desires an unrequited love, Sora's immunity to the Sirens' seduction magic allows him to awaken her.^{LN 5.4} Subsequently, Laila used Sora's hair to create a Siren daughter.^{LN 5.5} Laila later lends Sora the Siren Race Piece to bet against Holou in a game, during which Laila herself is smuggled into the Eastern Union and introduced to Ino, Plum, Chlammy and Fiel; her mere presence overturns their planned game, causing Plum's self-serving plan to collapse.^{LN 8.2}

== Other characters ==
Tet (テト, Teto), Riku Dola (リク・ドーラ, Riku Dōra) and Schwi Dola (シュヴィ・ドーラ, Syuvi Dōra)
Voiced by: Rie Kugimiya (Japanese); Shannon Emerick (English)
Tet is an Old Deus, (Note: 神霊種, Ōrudo Deusu) a magical entity born from wishes and prayers. During the era when the sixteen species were at war with each other, a human named Riku Dola and his Ex-Machina (Note: 機凱種, Ekusumakina) wife, Schwi Dola, imagined the existence of a god of games; this resulted in Tet's birth. Due to Riku's efforts, Tet comes into possession of an object known as the Suniaster (Note: 星杯, Sūniasutā; lit. "Star Grail"), allowing him to become the god of Disboard. Using its power, Tet cast the Ten Covenants on the world, ending the war and making the world centered around games.^{LN 6.5}

Azril (アズリール, Azurīru) and Avant Heim (アヴァント・ヘイム, Avanto Heimu)
Voiced by: Yui Horie (Japanese); Juliet Simmons (English)
Azril is the first Flügel and their leader following the death of Artosh, (Note: アルトシュ, Arutoshu) the Old Deus who created them. Since then, Azril has become despondent towards life and tries to give meaning to the Flügel's existence to prevent their suicide, although she continues to adore her youngest surviving sister, Jibril.^{LN 5.2} She is able to converse with the Flügel's homeland, a sentient floating island called Avant Heim which is part of a species called the Phantasma. (Note: 幻想種, Fantazuma)^{LN 5.1} Following her loss against Sora and Shiro, her powers are reduced to the levels of a human which gives her a new perspective on life.^{LN 5.3} She later willingly lends the Flügel Race Piece out for Jibril to bet in the game against Holou.^{LN 8.E}
Holou (帆楼, Horō)
An Old Deus and apparently the God of Doubt, she was the first and oldest conscious being in the world and thus had no name. She was born to question everything but never found any answers, not even after creating a race (the Ex-Machina) to help her quest for knowledge. Eventually she denied everything including herself and gouged herself of her Ether (Note: 神髄, Shinzui) (her quintessence as a god), which came loose. Instead of killing her, this rendered her inert until the modern era, where she was found by a young Shrine Maiden who tricked her and beat her in a game, binding her Ether in the body of the Shrine Maiden. Since then, she has unintentionally become a source of inspiration and support for the Shrine Maiden.^{LN 8.4} She occasionally interacts remotely with Tet, doubtfully questioning his motives and intentions.^{LN 2.0} Sora, Shiro and company utilize the Shrine Maiden's cooperation to unbind the Old Deus and challenge her to a game, wherein she emotionlessly imparts the rules at the start and then vanishes.^{LN 7.0} Holding the soul of the apparently-deceased Shrine Maiden, she reprimands her for apparently having deceived a god, not understanding what the Shrine Maiden sees in Sora and Shiro.^{LN 7.2} During the game she appears before players who reach the game's final task, to show them the futility of the game and to emotionlessly wait for their answer;^{LN 7.E} in doing so, she betrays her doubt in Sora and Shiro and her frustration at their progress.^{LN 8.2} After their victory she reacts with visible emotion for the first time, frustrated and confused, and attempts to hide herself from the world.^{LN 8.3} With her Ether coming loose again, Sora and Shiro watch her past through her ebbing powers; they convince her that she is not actually the god of doubt, proclaiming her instead the God of Wisdom (Note: 誇戯おもいかねの神, Omoikane no Kami), and naming her Holou (from "hollow", a pun on their own names and of Blank).^{LN 8.4} Finally accepting herself and her lack of knowledge, she joins Elkia and makes amends with the Shrine Maiden; she intends to cooperate with Sora and Shiro's plan to make her into both an idol and the self-declared representative of the Old Deus. She then declares her intentions directly to Tet, who thanks her for being born (her being the creator of Schwi's race), but he also makes her properly angry for the first time by defeating her in chess.^{LN 8.E}

== Notes and references ==
- ^LN represents the Light Novel of the series in the format of X.Y, where X represents the volume and Y represents the chapter.

Chapter A represents the afterword of the novel; Chapter 0 represents the prologue; and Chapter E represents the epilogue.

Japanese
