= Goodbye, Don Glees! =

2022 Japanese anime film

- Theatrical release poster
- Kanji: グッバイ、ドン・グリーズ!
- Revised Hepburn: Gubbai, Don Gurīzu!
- Directed by: Atsuko Ishizuka
- Screenplay by: Atsuko Ishizuka
- Starring: Natsuki Hanae; Yuki Kaji; Ayumu Murase; Kana Hanazawa; Rino Sashihara; Atsushi Tamura
- Edited by: Kashiko Kimura
- Music by: Yoshiki Fujisawa
- Production company: Madhouse
- Distributed by: Kadokawa Animation
- Release date: February 18, 2022
- Running time: 98 minutes
- Country: Japan
- Language: Japanese
- Box office: $90,052

Goodbye, Don Glees! (Japanese: グッバイ、ドン・グリーズ!, Hepburn: Gubbai, Don Gurīzu!) is a 2022 Japanese animated adventure film produced by Madhouse and directed by Atsuko Ishizuka. It premiered in Japan on February 18, 2022.

== Plot ==
When they were children, "Toto" Mitarai and Roma Kamogawa formed their own club, the Don Glees. As Toto reaches 15, he moves to Tokyo to attend high school. He returns a year later to find Roma longing for his crush, "Tivoli" Urayasu, who has moved to Ireland. Toto goads Roma to contact Tivoli, even calling Tivoli long distance to get Roma to talk to her.

Toto also discovers that Roma has added a new member to the club, "Drop" Sakuma. Drop talks Roma into spending all his money to buy a drone. They want to use the drone to film a large professional fireworks display, while setting their own fireworks in a secluded field. On the night of the display, they cannot get their fireworks to light and Roma loses the drone. Hours later, a wildfire breaks out in the mountains. The following day, their schoolmates spread rumors that the Don Glees set the fire, based on the police finding their dud fireworks. The three friends locate their drone and decide to retrieve it to clear their names.

The drone lands in an isolated area in the mountains so they decide to hike overnight to reach it. To go, they lie about their plans and dodge police officers and bears. They settle down near a small waterfall as night falls. Drop tells the others how everyone should have a "treasure" they want more than anything else. He talks about his time living in Iceland, where he once found a working telephone booth next to a "golden" waterfall. He also mentions a stay at the hospital and asks the others if they would have any regrets if the world ended tomorrow. Meanwhile, Toto spends all his time panicking about his cram school studies and admonishing his friends' childish behavior. He even brings a textbook to the hike as he has an exam the next day. He eventually admits that he's not sure he wants to become a doctor as his father wishes. He also tells Drop about the origin of the club name. The name comes from "Don't glee" in English, referring to how he and Roma never smiled or played with other children. Toto eventually adds his textbook to their campfire, no longer caring as much. Roma figures out that Tivoli is his "treasure".

The next day, they find the drone and return, only to discover that everyone has forgotten about the fire. Days later, Drop dies. A devastated Roma destroys the Don Glees clubhouse in grief. However, among the wreckage, they find two bottles of Coca-Cola with a map of Iceland drawn on it with an "x" which they think is Drop's telephone booth. They decide to fly to Iceland to find the booth and after several days of hiking, they find Drop's "golden waterfall." Nearby, they find the phone booth with a working phone. Toto sees the number and realizes that he called the number by mistake when he tried to call Tivoli. They deduce that Drop picked up the phone when they called the wrong number which inspired him to seek Toto and Roma out. They also find a note left by Drop describing his treasure as friends who will help him on his last adventure.

== Cast ==
Character	Japanese	English
Rōma Kamogawa	Natsuki Hanae	Adam McArthur
Hokuto "Toto" Mitarai	Yuki Kaji	Nick Wolfhard
Shizuku "Drop" Sakuma	Ayumu Murase	Jonathan Leon
Chibori "Tivoli" Urayasu	Kana Hanazawa	Victoria Grace
Mako Kamogawa	Rino Sashihara	Stephanie Sheh
Tarō Kamogawa	Atsushi Tamura	Alan Lee

== Production ==
In July 2021, it was revealed that the film would be produced by Madhouse, and directed and written by Atsuko Ishizuka, with Takahiro Yoshimatsu designing the characters and Kadokawa distributing the film. Yoshiaki Fujisawa will compose the music. The film's main theme song is "Rock the World" performed by Alexandros. The film was released in Japanese theaters on February 18, 2022. In North America, GKIDS acquired the rights to the film and it was released on September 14, 2022. Muse Communication licensed the film in South and Southeast Asia

== Media ==
=== Manga adaptation ===
A manga adaptation, written and illustrated by Shinki, began serialization in Media Factory's Monthly Comic Gene magazine on October 15, 2021. The adaptation completed its serialization on February 15, 2022.

== Reception ==
On the review aggregator website Rotten Tomatoes, 100% of 19 critics' reviews are positive, with an average rating of 7.5/10.

=== Accolades ===
Award	Date of ceremony	Category	Recipient(s)	Result	Ref.
Annecy International Animation Film Festival	June 18, 2022	Best Animated Film	Goodbye, Don Glees!	Nominated	
15th Asia Pacific Screen Awards	November 11, 2022	Best Animated Feature Film	Goodbye, Don Glees!	Nominated	
77th Mainichi Film Awards	December 21, 2022	Best Animation Film / Ōfuji Noburō Award	Goodbye, Don Glees!	Nominated	
