= Contrast (music) =

Difference between parts or different instrumental sounds

In music and musical form, contrast is the difference between parts or different instrument sounds. The three types of contrast are rhythmic contrast, melodic contrast, and harmonic contrast. Procedures of contrast include stratification, juxtaposition, and interpolation. Procedures of connection include gradation, amalgamation, and dissolution.

Harmonic contrast means to have a change in keys or chords or even cadences.

Contrast is not only a way of adding interest, and difference in a song, but is essential to the aesthetic illusion of dramatic resolution of conflict.

Contrast is a sector that provides a sub-conscious break to absorb the material from the main expository piece.
