= The Spider's Thread =

1918 Japanese short story by Ryūnosuke Akutagawa

- 1987 edition in English
- Author: Ryūnosuke Akutagawa
- Original title: 蜘蛛の糸 (Kumo no Ito)
- Translator: Timothy M. Kelly
- Language: Japanese
- Genre: Short story
- Publisher: Akai Tori
- Publication date: 1918
- Publication place: Japan

The Spider's Thread (蜘蛛の糸, Kumo no Ito) is a 1918 short story by Ryūnosuke Akutagawa, first published in the children's magazine Akai Tori. Its plot is identical to that of "The Spider Web", a chapter in Karma: A Story of Early Buddhism, written in 1894 by Paul Carus.

== Plot summary ==
Shakyamuni is meandering around Paradise one morning, when he stops at a lotus-filled pond. Between the lilies, he can see, through the crystal-clear waters, the depths of Hell. His eyes come to rest on one sinner in particular, by the name of Kandata. Kandata was a cold-hearted criminal, but had one good deed to his name: while walking through the forest one day, he decided not to kill a spider he was about to crush with his foot. Moved by this single act of compassion, the Buddha takes the silvery thread of a spider in Paradise and lowers it down into Hell.

Down in Hell, the myriad sinners are struggling in the Pool of Blood, in total darkness save for the light glinting off the Mountain of Spikes, and in total silence save for the sighs of the damned. Kandata, looking up by chance at the sky above the pool, sees the spider's thread descending towards him and grabs hold with all the might of a seasoned criminal. The climb from Hell to Paradise is not a short one, however, and Kandata quickly tires. Dangling from the middle of the rope, he glances downward, and sees how far he has come. Realizing that he may actually escape from Hell, he is overcome by joy and laughs giddily. His elation is short-lived, however, as he realizes that others have started climbing the thread behind him, stretching down into the murky depths below. Fearing that the thread will break from the weight of the others, he shouts that the spider's thread is his and his alone. It is at this moment that the thread breaks, and he and all the other sinners are cast back down into the Pool of Blood.

Shakyamuni witnesses this, knowing all, but still with a slightly sad air. In the end, Kandata condemned himself by being concerned only with his own salvation and not that of others. But Paradise continues on as it has, and it is nearly noontime there. Thus the Buddha continues his meanderings.

== Sources of inspiration ==
Akutagawa was known for piecing together many different sources for many of his stories, and "The Spider's Thread" is no exception. He read Fyodor Dostoevsky's The Brothers Karamazov in English translation sometime between 1917 and 1918, and the story of "The Spider's Thread" is a retelling of a very short fable from the novel known as the Fable of the Onion, where an evil woman who had done no good at all in her life is sent to hell, but her guardian angel points out to God that she had in fact done one good deed in her life: she once gave an onion to a beggar. So God tells the angel to take that onion and use it to pull her out of hell. The angel very nearly manages to pull her out, but when other sinners begin to hold on to her so they can also be pulled out, she kicks at them, saying that the onion is hers and she is the one getting pulled out, not them. At that moment, the onion breaks and the woman falls back into hell, where she remains. This is the plot of a European folk tale called "Saint Peter's Mother"

Another inspiration for Akutagawa appears to be "The Spider's Web", found in Karma: A Story of Early Buddhism, an anthology of five Buddhist parables published in Tokyo in 1895.

== Inspiration for works ==
The story inspired sasakure.UK to create the song "Spider Thread Monopoly" or "蜘蛛糸モノポリー" in Japanese (which he used Hatsune Miku as the main vocalist) The song's music video contains imagery and themes that reference The Spider's Thread.

== See also ==
- Cultural depictions of spiders
