= Toshiaki Ishizuka =

Japanese drummer (born 1950)

Toshiaki "Toshi" Ishizuka (石塚 俊明, Ishizuka Toshiaki; born February 2, 1950) is a Japanese drummer. He played on Kazuki Tomokawa's albums and is part of the band Vajra (with Kan Mikami and Keiji Haino). His last album, released in 2006 on P.S.F. Records, is entitled Drum Drama.
