= Asahito Nanjo =

Japanese underground musician

- Also known as: Red
- Born: Aichi, Japan
- Genres: psychedelic rock, free improvisation, experimental rock
- Years active: late '70s - present
- Website: homepage2.nifty.com

Asahito Nanjo (南條麻人) is a Japanese underground musician, best known for his psychedelic rock groups High Rise, Mainliner and Musica Transonic, and the ethnic improvisation unit Toho Sara. He has been active on the Tokyo underground scene since the late seventies.

Part of his sonic aesthetic is to record, mix, and master using extreme levels of distortion, dynamic range compression, and clipping making the sound of the instruments unrecognizable. The results can be said to contain elements of noise music.

== Musical activity ==
Below are the main groups with which he has been involved from 1979 to the present:

- Red Alert (psychedelic punk group, 79–81)
- Red (experimental performance, 79–89)
- Conformist (dark psychedelic group, 81–82)
- Deaf and Dumb House (esthetic improvisation unit, 81–82)
- Virus Freak (avant-garde free rock group, 81–82)
- Tako (avant-garde performance group, 81–82)
- I'm useless (strange free rock unit centring on Tamio Shiraishi, 81–82)
- Telepatys going bad of Rotness (psychedelic punk group, 81–82)
- Kousokuya (psychedelic avant-garde group, 82–83)
- Sweet Inspirations (progenitor of Maher Shalal Hash Baz, 83–84)
- Psychedelic Speed Freaks (the ur-High Rise, 83–84)
- High Rise (heavy psychedelic group, 84 - present)
- Shokubaiya (improvised music unit, 88–89)
- Nijiumu (improv unit formed with Keiji Haino, 88–90)
- Ohkami no Jikan (dark psychedelic group, 90 - present)
- Ten no Okami (avant-garde unit, with Keiji Haino, 90–91)
- Johari (ethnic meets experimental, 90–92)
- Toho Sara (avant-garde shamanism, 92- present)
- Group Musica (avant-garde symphonic group, 94 - present)
- Bibliotheca Hermetica (avant-garde, 94 - present)
- Mysterious Adni (avant-garde, 94 - present)
- Ancient Wisdom (avant-garde, 94 - present)
- Splendour Solis (avant-garde, 94 - present)
- Up Tight (free jazz unit, 94 - present)
- Musica Transonic (psychedelic improvised music, 94 - present)
- Mainliner (heavy psychedelic noise rock group, 95 - present)
- Psychedelic Background (trip psychedelic group, 96 - present)
- Minus Three Years Old (new psychedelic blues band, with Keiji Haino, 96 - present)

== Discography ==
Nanjo is credited on over 300 releases.

Selected discography:

=== High Rise ===
see High Rise (band) for full discography
on P.S.F label if not specified

- II (1986)
- Dispersion (1992)
- Disallow (1996)
- Psychedelic Speed Freaks '84-'85 (1997, Time Bomb)
- Desperado (1998)

=== Mainliner ===
see Mainliner (band) for full discography

- Mellow Out (1996)
- Imaginative Plain (2001)
