= Kawabata Makoto =

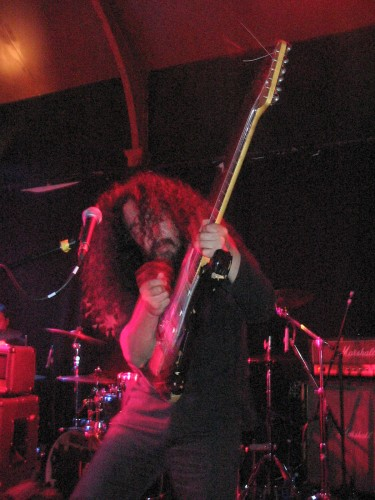
- Kawabata in performance in London in 2005

Background information
- Born: 1965 (age 60–61); Osaka, Japan
- Genres: Psychedelic rock
- Instruments: Guitar, Sitar, Vocals, Violin, Hurdy-Gurdy, Bass Guitar, Bouzouki
- Years active: 1978–present

Kawabata Makoto (河端 一) (born 1965) is a Japanese musician and founding member of the band Acid Mothers Temple. He was part of one line-up of Gong when Acid Mothers Temple and Gong briefly fused into one group.

== Early life ==
He was born in Osaka.

== Band history ==
Kawabata is chiefly famous for his leadership of Acid Mothers Temple and its variants; however, he has also played in many other bands since the start of his career in 1978. Some of these bands are:

- Baroque Bordello
- Toho Sara
- Erochika
- Tsurubami
- Musica Transonic
- Mainliner
- Mothers of Invasion
- Nishinihon
- Floating Flower

== Solo discography ==
In addition to the many records recorded with bands, Kawabata Makoto has an extensive solo discography. Major releases are:

- The 'Private Tapes' series (1999–2004)
- Inui.1 (2000)
- Inui.2 (2000)
- I'm in Your Inner Most (2001)
- Hosanna Mantra (2007)
- Inui.4 (2007)
- We're one-sided lovers each other's (2013- Bam Balam.records)

== Musical philosophy ==
In 2000, Kawabata wrote "Music, for me, is neither something that I create, nor a form of self-expression. All kinds of sounds exist everywhere around us, and my performances solely consist of picking up these sounds, like a radio tuner, and playing them so that people can hear them."

"When I was a kid, I really loved Ritchie Blackmore – not so much the guitar style, just I liked his look, atmosphere, on the stage. Always, he stood on this side [right], also the stratocaster, and black clothes, and very aggressive [playing]. I really loved this image, so I wear just black. Also – easy to co-ordinate!"
