= P.S.F. Records =

P.S.F. Records is a Japanese record label specialising in underground psychedelic and folk music, and free improvisation. The label was established in Tokyo by Hideo Ikeezumi (1949-2017) (生悦住英夫) with the philosophy "I only release to what I like, and I hope that some of these sounds will appeal to the more discerning listener". It is named after its first release, the 1984 High Rise record Psychedelic Speed Freaks. P.S.F. is linked to a Tokyo record store, Modern Music, and a Japanese-language underground music magazine called G-Modern.

P.S.F. have released records by Acid Mothers Temple, High Rise, Mainliner, White Heaven, Ghost, Kousokuya, Masayuki Takayanagi, Kaoru Abe, Keiji Haino, Fushitsusha, Masayoshi Urabe, Kazuki Tomokawa, Toshiaki Ishizuka, Tamio Shiraishi, Aural Fit, a split LP feat. Six Organs of Admittance and many other artists.

Japanese bands and musicians featured on P.S.F. Records have also had music released and reissued by labels such as La Musica, Charnel, Riot Season, Squealer, Fractal, aRCHIVE, Assommer, etc.

== See also ==
- List of record labels
