= Important Records discography =

The following is a discography of the American independent record label Important Records and its sublabel Cassauna.

== Important Records catalog ==
Note: All catalog numbers are prefixed with "imprec".

Cat.	Year	Artist	Title	Format	Note(s)
001	2001	Daniel Johnston	Impossible Love	7"	
002	2002	Merzbow	Amlux	CD	
003	2002	Hyperjinx Tricycle	Greetings from the Hyperjinx Tricycle	7"	
004	2002	Merzbow	Merzbeat	CD	
005	2002	KK Null	Kosmik Engine	CD	co-release with Voidstar Productions
006	2002	Hyperjinx Tricycle	The Songs of Jack Medicine, Daniel Johnston & Ron English	CD	
007	2002	Muslimgauze	Uzbekistani Bizzare and Souk	CD	reissue
008	2002	Genesis P-Orridge	Painful 7 Inches	7"	
009	2003	Acid Mothers Temple & The Melting Paraiso U.F.O.	Ziggy Sitar Dust Raga	Mini CD	Magical Power from Mars volume 1
010	2003	Acid Mothers Temple & The Melting Paraiso U.F.O.	Diamond Doggy Peggy	Mini CD	Magical Power from Mars volume 2
011	2003	Acid Mothers Temple & The Melting Paraiso U.F.O.	Cosmic Funky Dolly	Mini CD	Magical Power from Mars volume 3
012	2003	The Hafler Trio	A Small Child Dreams of Voiding the Plague	Mini CD	
013	2003	Hyperjinx Tricycle	Alien Mind Control	Mini CD	
014	2003	Merzbow	Ikebana: Merzbow's Amlux Rebuilt, Reused and Recycled	CD	promotional sampler
015	2003	The Dresden Dolls	A Is for Accident	CD	
016	2003	Merzbow	Ikebana: Merzbow's Amlux Rebuilt, Reused and Recycled	CD	remix album
017	2003	Acid Mothers Temple & The Melting Paraiso U.F.O.	Magical Power from Mars	CD	compilation
018	2003	Kimya Dawson	Knock Knock Who?	CD	
019	2003	Kimya Dawson	My Cute Fiend Sweet Princess	CD	
020	2003	Jad Fair	untitled	7"	Arts & Crafts Series 1
021	2003	The Dresden Dolls	Good Day / A Night at the Roses	7"	Arts & Crafts Series 2
022–024	2004	Merzbow	Last of Analog Sessions	3×CD	
025	2004	Muslimgauze	Zuriff Moussa	LP	reissue
026	2004	Space Machine	3	CD	reissue
027	2003	The Hafler Trio	Kisses with Both Hands from Gods Little Toy	Mini CD	
028	2013	Éliane Radigue	Adnos I–III	3×CD	reissue
029	2004	Absolut Null Punkt	Live in Japan	CD	
030	2003	John Fahey	Hitomi	2×LP	reissue
031	2004	Kimya Dawson	My Cute Fiend Sweet Princess	LP	reissue
032	2004	Kimya Dawson	Knock Knock Who?	LP	reissue
033	2004	Fe-Mail	Syklubb fra Hælvete	CD	reissue
034	2004	King Missile III	Royal Lunch	CD	
035	2004	Genesis P-Orridge & Astrid Monroe	When I Was Young	CD	
036	2004	Barbez	Barbez	CD	
037	2004	Kawabata Makoto	O Si Amos A Sighire A Essere Duas Umbras?	CD	
038	2004	Jack Dangers	Forbidden Planet Explored	CD	
039	2004	The Hafler Trio	I Never Knew Thats Who You Thought You Were	Mini CD	Arts & Crafts Series 3
040	2004	Merzbow	Merzbird	CD	
041	2004	Noam Chomsky	War Crimes & Imperial Fantasies	CD	
042	2004	Jack Dangers	Loudness Clarifies / Electronic Music from Tapelab	2×CD	
043	2005	Larsen	Plays	CD	
044	2005	Beequeen	The Bodyshop	CD	
045	2005	Piano Magic	Open Cast Heart	CD	
046	2005	Daniel Menche	Sirocco	CD	
047	2005	Mars	The Complete Studio Recordings NYC 1977–1978	LP	reissue
048	2005	Wolf Eyes	Fuck the Old Miami	12"	reissue
049	2005	Diane Cluck	Oh Vanille/Ova Nil	CD	reissue
050	2005	The Hafler Trio	Á Ég Að, Halda Áfram?	Mini CD	
051	2005	The Hafler Trio	Exactly As I Do	2×CD	
052	2005	Merzbow	Merzbuddha	CD	
053	2005	The Birds	Let's Do The Velvets! The VU by The Birds	7"	covers of The Velvet Underground
054	2005	Henry Jacobs	The Wide Weird World of Henry Jacobs / The Fine Art of Goofing Off	CD + DVD	
055	2005	The Hafler Trio	Being a Firefighter Isn't Just About Squirting Water	Mini CD	
056	2005	Angels of Light	New Mother	LP	reissue, co-release with Broken Sparrow
057	2005	(r)	Under the Cables, Into the Wind	CD	
058	2005	Acid Mothers Temple & The Cosmic Inferno	Just Another Band from the Cosmic Inferno	CD	
059	2005	The Birds	Birds Birds Birds in the World	CD	
060	2005	Earth / KK Null	Dexamyl / Andromeda	CD	split release
061	2004	Vibracathedral Orchestra	Tuning to the Rooster	CD	
062	2005	Hototogisu	Ghosts from the Sun	2×CD	reissue
063	2005	Barbez	Insignificance	CD	
064	2005	Carlos Giffoni	Welcome Home	CD	
065	2005	XXL	¡Ciaütistico!	CD	Xiu Xiu and Larsen
066	2005	The Hafler Trio	Exactly As I Am	2×CD	
067	2005	Angels of Light	How I Loved You	2×LP	reissue, co-released with Broken Sparrow
068	2005	Unbunny	Typist	CD	Arts & Crafts Series 4
069	2005	Tom Carter & Robert Horton	Lunar Eclipse	CD	
070	2005	Merzbow	Merzbuta	CD	
071	2006	Citay	Citay	CD	
072	2005	Larsen	HMKE	CD	
073	2005	Ocean	Here Where Nothing Grows	CD	
074	2006	Keiji Haino	Reveal'd to None As Yet – An Expedience to Utterly Vanquish Consciousness While Still Alive	2×CD	co-release with aRCHIVE
075	2006	Boris	Vein	LP	"Hardcore" version
075	2006	Boris	Vein	LP	"Noise" version
076	2006	Anoice	Remmings	CD	
077	2005	My Cat Is an Alien	Cosmic Light of the Third Millennium	CD	
078	2006	Diane Cluck	Macy's Day Bird / Black with Green Leaves	2×CD	compilation
079	2005	Angels of Light	Everything Is Good Here/Please Come Home	2×LP	reissue, co-released with Broken Sparrow
080	2006	Lee Ranaldo / Carlos Giffoni / Thurston Moore / Nels Cline	Four Guitars Live	CD	
081	2006	Daniel Johnston and Jack Medicine	The Electric Ghosts	CD	
082	2006	Mouthus	The Long Salt	CD	
083	2006	Larsen	SeieS	CD	
084	2006	James Blackshaw	O True Believers	CD	
085	2006	Slomo	The Creep	CD	reissue
086	2005	Pestrepeller	Isle of Dark Magick	CD	
087	2006	Lee Ranaldo	Vancouver Ambients 1–4	7"	Arts & Crafts Series 6
088	2006	Lee Ranaldo	Ambient Loop for Vancouver	CD	
089	2006	Major Stars	Syntoptikon	CD	
090	2006	Piano Magic	Incurable	Mini CD	
091	2006	Ocean	Here Where Nothing Grows	2×LP	reissue
092	2006	Maja S. K. Ratkje	Stalker	12"	picture disc
093	2006	My Cat Is an Alien	Introducing the Cosmic Blues	7"	Arts & Crafts Series 5
094	2006	The Hafler Trio / Colin Potter / Andrew Liles	3 Eggs.	CD	
095	2006	Paul Flaherty / Chris Corsano / C. Spencer Yeh	A Rock in the Snow	CD	
096	2006	Paul Flaherty / Chris Corsano / C. Spencer Yeh	Snow Blind Avalanche	LP	
097	2006	Merzbow	Minazo Vol. 1	CD	
098	2006	various artists	Belly of the Whale: Digital Music Made from the Sounds of Marine Animals	CD	
099	2006	Keiji Haino & Sitaar Tah!	Animamima	2×CD	co-release with aRCHIVE
100	2006	various artists	A User's Guide to the First 100 Important Records Releases	CD	
101	2006	Alasehir	Sharing the Sacred	CD	
102	2006	Alumbrados	A Generation of Vipers	CD	
103	2006	Daniel Menche	Jugularis	CD	
104	2006	Mudsuckers	Mudsuckers	CD	
105	2006	Grails	Black Tar Prophecies Vol's 1, 2, & 3	CD	compilation
105	2010	Grails	Black Tar Prophecies Vol's 1, 2, & 3	LP	reissue
106	2006	Hototogisu	Some Blood Will Stick	CD	compilation
107	2006	Merzbow	Minazo Volume Two	LP	
108	2006	Steven R. Smith	The Anchorite	LP	Arts & Crafts Series 7
109	2006	Rivulets	You Are My Home	CD	
110	2006	Absolut Null Punkt	Metacompound	CD	
111	2006	KK Null	Kosmista Noisea	CD	
112	2006	Fe-Mail and Carlos Giffoni	Northern Stains	CD	
113	2006	Conrad Schnitzler	Klavierhelm	CD	
114	2006	Conrad Schnitzler	Trigger Trilogy	3×CD	compilation
115	2007	Roberto Opalio	Chants from Isolated Ghosts	CD	reissue
116	2006	My Cat Is an Alien	Leave Me in the Black No-Thing	CD	
117	2006	Birchville Cat Motel & Yellow Swans	Birchville Cat Motel & Yellow Swans	CD	
118	2007	Death Unit	Infinite Death	CD	
119	2007	Baikal	Baikal	CD	
120	2007	Axolotl	Memory Theatre	CD	compilation
121	2007	Mouthus	Follow This House	CD	
122	2007	The Vanishing Voice	Stone Tablet	CD	
123	2007	Prurient / Mindflayer	By the River / Turbo Boost	7"	split release
124	2007	Major Stars	Portable Freak Factory / Can You See Me?	7"	
125	2006	Eleh	Floating Frequencies/Intuitive Synthesis I	LP	
126	2007	Rameses III	Honey Rose	CD	
127	2007	The Bark Haze	Total Joke Era	CD	
128	2007	The Bark Haze	LP	LP	
129	2007	Larsen and Friends	ABECEDA	CD + DVD	
130	2007	XXL	¿Spicchiology?	CD	first 1000 copies include imprec130b
130b	2007	XXL	¿Spicchiology? Sources – Live Studio Rehearsal Sessions	CD	included with first 1000 copies of imprec130
131	2007	Merzbow and Carlos Giffoni	Synth Destruction	CD	
132	2006	The Vanishing Voice	Nordic Visions	CD	reissue
133	2007	William Hooker with Eyvind Kang & Bill Horist	The Seasons Fire	CD	
134	2007	Jessica Rylan	Interior Designs	CD	
135	2007	Larsen	Musm II	CD	compilation
136	2007	Merzbow	Merzbear	CD	
137	2007	Smegma	33 1/3	CD	
138	2007	Alessandro Stefana	Poste E Telegrafi	CD	
139	2007	Citay	Little Kingdom	LP	
140	2007	Pauline Oliveros	Accordion & Voice	CD	reissue
140	2022	Pauline Oliveros	Accordion & Voice	LP	reissue
141	2007	Pauline Oliveros	The Wanderer	CD	reissue
141	2022	Pauline Oliveros	The Wanderer	LP	reissue
142	2007	The Vanishing Voice	Stone Tablet	LP	includes a bonus track
143	2007	Asa Irons & Swaan Miller	Asa Irons & Swaan Miller	CD	
144	2007	Ocean / Conifer	Durance Vile / Building State Empire	LP	split release
145	2007	Smegma	33 1/3	LP	includes a bonus track
146	2007	Acid Mothers Temple & the Melting Paraiso U.F.O.	Crystal Rainbow Pyramid Under the Stars	CD	
147	2007	Acid Mothers Temple & the Melting Paraiso U.F.O.	Crystal Rainbow Pyramid Tour	LP	
148	2007	Black Magic Disco	Black Magic Disco	CD	
149	2007	Julia Kent	Delay	CD	
150	2007	Kurt Weisman	Spiritual Sci-Fi	CD	
151	2007	Piano Magic	Part Monster	CD	
152	2007	Kawabata Makoto	Hosanna Mantra	CD	
153	2007	Barbez	Mexico City Impressions / Someone Get Rid of the King	7"	Arts & Crafts Series 8
154	2007	Duane Pitre / Pilotram Ensemble	Organized Pitches Occurring in Time	CD	
155	2007	Astral Social Club	Neon Pibroch	CD	
156	2007	Astral Social Club	Super Grease	LP	
157	2007	(r)	In Pink	CD	
158	2007	Eleh	Floating Frequencies/Intuitive Synthesis II	LP	
159	2007	Tom Carter, Robert Horton, Lisa Cameron & Lee Ann Cameron	Sky City	CD	
160	2007	Acid Mothers Guru Guru	Psychedelic Navigator	CD	
161	2007	Mani Neumeier	Sketches	CD	
162	2008	various artists	The Garden of Forking Paths	CD	
163	2007	XBXRX	Sounds	CD	
164	2007	LSD March	Constellation of Tragedy	CD	
165	2007	Suishou no Fune	The Shining Star – Live	CD	
166	2007	XBXRX	Sounds	LP	
167	2007	Christina Kubisch	Five Electrical Walks	CD	
168	2007	Christina Kubisch	Night Flights	CD	reissue
169	2007	Birchville Cat Motel	Seventh Ruined Hex	CD	
170	2007	A Place to Bury Strangers	A Place to Bury Strangers	LP	
171	2007	Sun	I'll Be the Same	LP	
172	2008	Tau Emerald	Travellers Two	CD	
173	2008	Thuja	Thuja...	LP	
174	2008	Coil	The Ape of Naples / The New Backwards	4×LP	reissue with bonus album
174	2016	Coil	The Ape of Naples	CD	reissue
174	2016	Coil	The Ape of Naples	2×LP	reissue
175	2008	Daniel Menche	Body Melt	LP	
176	2008	Daniel Menche	Glass Forest	CD	
177	2008	Beequeen	Sandancing	CD	
178	2008	Rameses III	Basilica	2×CD	
179	2008	Kluster	Admira	CD	reissue
180	2008	Kluster	Vulcano	CD	
181	2008	The Wardrobe	Lucifer Before Sunrise (Inferno mix) / Abattoirs of Love	7"	
182	2008	Eleh / Sun Circle	Fading Spectrum of Darkness / Parhelion	LP	split release
183	2007	John Fahey	The Mill Pond	CD	reissue
184	2008	Anthony Braxton	Quartet (GTM) 2006	4×CD	
185	2008	3 Day Band	3 Day Band	CD	
186	2008	Beequeen	Sandancing Demos	10"	
187	2008	Dan Friel	Ghost Town	CD	
187	2008	Dan Friel	Ghost Town	LP	
188	2008	Acid Mothers Temple & The Melting Paraiso U.F.O.	Recurring Dream and Apocalypse of Darkness	CD	
188	2008	Acid Mothers Temple & The Melting Paraiso U.F.O.	Recurring Dream and Apocalypse of Darkness	2×LP	includes bonus tracks
189	2008	Coil / The New Blockaders / Vortex Campaign	The Melancholy Mad Tenant	LP	partial reissue
190	2008	Grails	Take Refuge in Clean Living	CD	
190	2008	Grails	Take Refuge in Clean Living	LP	
191	2008	Cluster	Berlin 07	CD	
192	2008	Sic Alps	United	7"	cover of Throbbing Gristle, single sided
193	2008	Bass Communion	Molotov and Haze	CD	
194	2008	Bass Communion / Pig	Live in Mexico City	LP	
195	2009	C. Spencer Yeh and Paul Flaherty with Greg Kelly	New York Nuts & Boston Beans	CD	
196	2008	Kawabata Makoto & Michishita Shinsuke	Basement Echo	CD	
197	2008	Astro	The Echo from the Purple Dawn	CD	
198	2008	Astro	Live at Muryoku Muzen Temple	LP	
199	2009	Andrea Parkins	Faulty (Broken Orbit)	CD	
200	2008	various artists	This Tape Is Supposed to Be About Love	CD	
201	2008	Carlos Giffoni	Zamuro	LP	
202	2008	Tom Carter	Shots at Infinity 1	CD	
203	2008	Tom Carter	Shots at Infinity 2	LP	
204	2008	Kawabata Makoto	We Don't Know Where We Came From	LP	reissue
205	2008	Merzbow	Dolphin Sonar	CD	
206	2008	Eleh / Pauline Oliveros	The Beauty of the Steel Skeleton / Drifting Depths	LP	split release
207	2008	Eleh	Floating Frequencies/Intuitive Synthesis III	LP	
208	2008	Larsen	LLL	LP	
209	2008	Conifer	Crown Fire	CD	
209	2008	Conifer	Crown Fire	2×LP	includes a bonus track
210	2008	Hototogisu	Pale Fatal Sister	2×LP	
211	2008	Tecumseh	Avalanche and Inundation	CD	
211	2008	Tecumseh	Avalanche and Inundation	LP	
212	2008	Slomo	The Bog	CD	
213	2008	Zak Riles	Zak Riles	CD	
214	2008	Aidan Baker	I Wish Too, to Be Absorbed	2×CD	compilation
215	2008	Aidan Baker / Leah Buckareff / Nadja	Trinitarian	LP	split release
216	2008	Roberto Opalio / Maurizio Opalio	Roberto Opalio / Maurizio Opalio	LP	split release
217	2008	My Cat Is an Alien / Praxinoscope	For the Tears of Land, Prayers from Outer Space	2×LP	split release
218	2009	Risil	Non Meters, Volume One	CD	
218	2009	Risil	Non Meters, Volume One	2×LP	
220	2008	Ocean	Pantheon of the Lesser	CD	
220	2010	Ocean	Pantheon of the Lesser	2×LP	reissue
221	2008	Larsen	La Fever Lit	CD	
222	2008	Brethren of the Free Spirit	The Wolf Also Shall Dwell with the Lamb	CD	
222	2009	Brethren of the Free Spirit	The Wolf Also Shall Dwell with the Lamb	LP	
223	2008	The Skull Defekts	Waving / Building Temples for New Gods	7"	
224	2009	Zurich	Zurich	LP	
224	2014	Zurich	Zurich	CD	includes bonus tracks
225	2009	Holy Sons	Drifter's Sympathy	CD	
226	2008	Acid Mothers Temple & The Melting Paraiso U.F.O.	Glorify Astrological Martyrdom	LP	
226	2008	Acid Mothers Temple & The Melting Paraiso U.F.O.	Glorify Astrological Martyrdom	CD	
227	2009	Strings of Consciousness & Angel	Strings of Consciousness & Angel	CD	
228	2009	Anahita	Matricaria	CD	
229	2009	LSD March	Under Milk Wood	CD	
230	2009	Merzbow	Suzume	CD	13 Japanese Birds Pt. 1
231	2009	The Thirteenth Assembly	(Un)Sentimental	CD	
232	2009	Jozef van Wissem	It Is All That Is Made	CD	
233	2009	Merzbow	Fukurou	CD	13 Japanese Birds Pt. 2
234	2009	Gareth Davis & Steven R. Smith	Westering	LP	
235	2009	The Skull Defekts	The Temple	CD	
235	2009	The Skull Defekts	The Temple	2×LP	includes bonus tracks
236	2009	Merzbow	Yurikamome	CD	13 Japanese Birds Pt. 3
237	2009	Om	Conference Live	LP	
238	2009	Nate Wooley / Paul Lytton / David Grubbs	Seven Storey Mountain	CD	
239	2009	Tongues of Mount Meru	The Ocean of Milk	LP	
240	2009			T-shirt	Volvo 240 design
241	2009	Merzbow	Karasu	CD	13 Japanese Birds Pt. 4
242	2009	Emily Jane White	Dark Undercoat	CD	reissue
243	2009	Pick-Up	Mouthless	LP	Arts & Crafts Series 9
244	2009	Eleh	Meditations & Improvisations Volume One	LP	mailorder only
245	2009	Eleh	Meditations & Improvisations Volume Two	LP	mailorder only
246	2009	Cave	Made in Malaysia / Boneyard	7"	
247	2009	Cave	Psychic Psummer	CD	
247	2009	Cave	Psychic Psummer	LP	
248	2009	Bardo Pond	Gazing at Shilla	LP	
249	2009	Alasehir	Torment of the Metals	LP	
250	2009	Alumbrados	Monochord	LP	
251	2009	Moon Phantoms	Moon Phantoms	LP	
252	2009	Merzbow	Uzura	CD	13 Japanese Birds Pt. 5
253	2009	Acid Mothers Temple & The Melting Paraiso U.F.O.	Dark Side of the Black Moon: What Planet Are We On?	CD	
253	2009	Acid Mothers Temple & The Melting Paraiso U.F.O.	Dark Side of the Black Moon: What Planet Are We On?	2×LP	includes bonus tracks
254	2009	Anarchist Republic of Bzzz	Anarchist Republic of Bzzz	CD	
255	2009	Mouthus / Bulbs	Where the Bridge Was Found / Emerald Isle	LP	split release
256	2009	Merzbow	Kamo	CD	13 Japanese Birds Pt. 6
257	2009	Merzbow	Kujakubato	CD	13 Japanese Birds Pt. 7
258	2009	Deceh	Deceh	LP	
259	2009	Éliane Radigue	Vice Versa, Etc....	2×CD	reissue
260	2009	Éliane Radigue	Trityph	CD	
261	2009	Merzbow	Kokuchou	CD	13 Japanese Birds Pt. 8
262	2010	various artists	Viva Negativa! A Tribute to The New Blockaders Vol. III: USA	2×CD	tribute to The New Blockaders
263	2010	Pauline Oliveros / Éliane Radigue / Yoshi Wada / Sun Circle	Attention Patterns	2×LP	co-release with Black Pollen Press
264	2009	Holy Sons	Criminal's Return	CD	
265	2009	Merzbow	Hiyodori	CD	13 Japanese Birds Pt. 9
266	2009	Dominique Leone	Abstract Expression	CD	
267	2010	Jozef van Wissem	Ex Patris	CD	
267	2009	Jozef van Wissem	Ex Patris	LP	
268	2009	Neuter River	Neuter River	LP	
269	2012	Mi and L'Au	If Beauty Is A Crime	CD	
270	2009	Merzbow	Niwatori	CD	13 Japanese Birds Pt. 10
271	2010	Guano Padano	Guano Padano	CD	reissue
271	2010	Guano Padano	Guano Padano	LP	reissue
272	2010	various artists	The Harmonic Series: A Compilation of Musical Works in Just Intonation	CD	
273	2010	Nadja	Thaumogenesis	2×LP + CD	reissue, includes a bonus CD imprec288
274	2009	Robin Crutchfield	The Hidden Folk	CD	
275	2009	Merzbow	Shirasagi	CD	13 Japanese Birds Pt. 11
276	2009	The New Monuments	The New Monuments	LP	
277	2009	Eleh	Retreat	LP	mailorder only
278	2009	Eleh	Return	LP	mailorder only
279	2011	Asva	Presences of Absences	CD	
280	2010	Mika Vainio / Kouhei Matsunaga	Mika Vainio / Kouhei Matsunaga	12"	split release
281	2010	Mika Vainio / Kouhei Matsunaga / Sean Booth	3. Telepathics Meh In-Sect Er Connection	CD	
282	2010	Kouhei Matsunaga	Self VA.	CD	
283	2010	NHK	Special	12"	
284	2009	Merzbow	Tsubame	CD	13 Japanese Birds Pt. 12
285	2009	Merzbow	Chabo	CD	13 Japanese Birds Pt. 13
286	2010	Mugstar	...Sun, Broken...	CD	
287	2009	Mountainhood	The River / The Road	7"	Arts & Crafts Series 10
288	2010	Nadja	2009.02.06	CD	included with imprec273
289	2010	Aun	VII	CD	
290	2010	The Skull Defekts	Skulls CM von Hausswolff & The Sons of God Descending the Silver River of the DFX	LP	
291	2010	Kid606	Songs About Fucking Steve Albini	CD	
292	2010	Robedoor	Burners	LP	
294	2010	Merzbow	Ecobag/13 Birds in a Bag +1	13×CD + CDr	13 Japanese Birds box set
295	2010	various artists	We Are All One, in the Sun	CD	tribute to Robbie Basho
296	2010	Master Musicians of Bukkake	The Visible Sign of the Invisible Order	2×LP	reissue
297	2010	Acid Mothers Temple & The Melting Paraiso U.F.O.	In 0 to ∞	CD	
297	2010	Acid Mothers Temple & The Melting Paraiso U.F.O.	In 0 to ∞	2×LP	
298	2012	Nadja	Excision	2×CD	compilation
299	2010	Henry Jacobs	Around the World with Henry Jacobs	2×CD	
300	2011	various artists	IMPREC300	LP	
301	2010	Master Musicians of Bukkake	Totem Two	CD	
301	2010	Master Musicians of Bukkake	Totem Two	LP	
302	2010	Grails	Black Star Prophecies Vol 4	12"	
303	2010	Eleh	Repose	LP	mailorder and MUTEK only
304	2010	Jon Mueller & Z'EV	Hydration	LP	
305	2010	JD Emmanuel	Wizards	LP	reissue
305	2015	JD Emmanuel	Wizards	CD	reissue
306	2010	Bitchin Bajas	Tones / Zones	LP	
307	2010	Hototogisu	Floating Japanese Oof! Gardens of the 21st Century...	2×CD	reissue
308	2010	Cluster & Farnbauer	Live in Vienna 1980	2×CD	reissue
309	2013	Aki Onda	Cassette Memories Volume 3: South of the Border	CD	
310	2010	Larsen & Nurse with Wound	Erroneous, a Selection of Errors	CD	
311	2010	Smegma	Mirage	CD	includes bonus tracks
311	2010	Smegma	Mirage	LP	
312	2010	Lesser / Matmos / Wobbly	Simultaneous Quodlibet	LP	
314	2010	Mugstar	Lime	CD	
315	2010	Lesbian	Stratospheria Cubensis	CD	
316	2010	Chord	Progression	CD	
316	2010	Chord	Progression	LP	
317	2010	Barn Own & The Infinite Strings Ensemble	The Headlands	LP	
318	2010	Eleh / Ellen Fullman	Mind of No Mind / Event Locations	LP	split release
319	2010	Eleh	Radiant Intervals	LP	
320	2011	Vampillia	Alchemic Heart	CD	
321	2011	Merzbow	Jigokuhen	LP	13 Japanese Birds final part
322	2011	Maurizio Bianchi & Francisco López	KRMN	CD	
323	2011	Arnold Dreyblatt	Turntable History	CD	performance version released on SAUNA014
324	2011	Julia Kent	Green and Grey	CD	
325	2011	Larsen	Cool Cruel Mouth	CD	
326	2011	Larsen & Z'EV	In V.Tro	CD	
327	2011	Christina Kubisch	Mono Fluido	CD	
328	2011	Christina Kubisch	Magnetic Flights	CD	
329	2011	Jozef van Wissem	The Joy That Never Ends	CD	includes a bonus track
329	2011	Jozef van Wissem	The Joy That Never Ends	LP	
330	2011	Nate Wooley / Chris Corsano / C. Spencer Yeh	The Seven Storey Mountain	CD	
331	2011	Acid Mothers Temple & The Melting Paraiso U.F.O.	Live as Troubadour	LP	
332	2020	mHz	Function	CD	
333	2011	Master Musicians of Bukkake	Totem Three	CD	
333	2011	Master Musicians of Bukkake	Totem Three	LP	
334	2011	Asmus Tietchens / Kouhei Matsunaga	Asmus Tietchens / Kouhei Matsunaga	LP	split release
335	2011	Barn Own & The Infinite Strings Ensemble	The Headlands	CD	
336	2011	Ellen Fullman	Through Glass Panes	CD	
337	2011	Éliane Radigue	Transamorem–Transmortem	CD	
338	2011	Miminokoto	Hitoyogiri	CD	
339	2011	Beequeen	Port Out Starboard Home	CD	
340	2011	Rivulets	We're Fucked	CD	
341	2011	James Blackshaw	Holly EP	12"	
342	2011	Master Musicians of Bukkake	Twilight of the Kali Yuga Tours	LP	
343	2011	The Thirteenth Assembly	Station Direct	CD	
344	2011	Eleh	Floating Frequencies/Intuitive Synthesis	3×CD	compilation
345	2012	Portraits	Portraits	LP	
346	2012	Ustad Abdul Karim Khan	1934–1935	CD	compilation
347	2013	Overhang Party	Complete Studio Recordings	4×CD	compilation
348	2012	Jozef van Wissem and Jim Jarmusch	Concerning the Entrance into Eternity	CD	
348	2012	Jozef van Wissem and Jim Jarmusch	Concerning the Entrance into Eternity	LP	
349	2012	Duane Pitre	Feel Free	CD	
349	2012	Duane Pitre	Feel Free	LP	
350	2012	Eleh / Duane Pitre	Empty Summer Endless / Feel Free Installation	LP	split release
351	2012	Anoice	The Black Rain	CD	
352	2012	Pauline Oliveros	Reverberations: Tape & Electronic Music 1961–1970	12×CD	compilation
353	2012	Eleh	Radiant Intervals	CD	reissue
354	2013	Catherine Christer Hennix	Chora(s)san Time-Court Mirage: Live at the Grimm Museum Volume One	CD	
355	2012	James Blackshaw	Love Is the Plan, the Plan Is Death	CD	
355	2012	James Blackshaw	Love Is the Plan, the Plan Is Death	LP	
356	2012	Kawabata Makoto & à qui avec Gabriel	Golden Tree	CD	
357	2012	Acid Mothers Temple & The Melting Paraiso U.F.O.	Son of a Bitches Brew	2×LP	
357	2012	Acid Mothers Temple & The Melting Paraiso U.F.O.	Son of a Bitches Brew	CD	
358	2012	Deep Listening Band	Octagonal Polyphony	LP	
359	2012	Deep Listening Band	Great Howl at Town Haul	CD	
360	2012	Land	Night Within	CD	
360	2012	Land	Night Within	LP	
361	2012	Master Musicians of Bukkake	Totem One	LP	reissue
362	2012	Scientist	The Best Dub Album in the World	LP	reissue
363	2012	Scientist	Scientist in the Kingdom of Dub	LP	reissue
364	2014	Gezan	It Was Once Said to Be a Song	CD	reissue
365	2012	Eleh	The Weight of Accumulation	LP	mailorder only
366	2012	Machinefabriek	Secret Photographs	CD	
367	2013	Lawrence English	Lonely Womens Club	LP	
368	2012	Folke Rabe	What??	CD	reissue
369	2012	Eleh	Retreat, Return, Repose	3×CD	compilation
370	2014	Diane Cluck	Boneset	CD	
370	2014	Diane Cluck	Boneset	10"	
371	2012	Major Stars	Decibels of Gratitude	CD	
372	2013	Holy Sons	My Only Warm Coals	CD	reissue
373	2013	Alessandro Cortini	Forse 1	2×LP	reissue
374	2013	Alessandro Cortini	Forse 2	2×LP	
375	2013	James Blackshaw and Lubomyr Melnyk	The Watchers	CD	
375	2013	James Blackshaw and Lubomyr Melnyk	The Watchers	LP	
376	2015	Eleh	Homage	3×CD	compilation
377	2013	Total Life / Deceh	Fader / Thrive Outside Economy	LP	split release
378	2013	Gaspar Claus	Jo Ha Kyū	CD	
378	2013	Gaspar Claus	Jo Ha Kyū	LP	
379	2013	Jozef van Wissem	Nihil Obstat	CD	
379	2013	Jozef van Wissem	Nihil Obstat	LP	
380	2013	Günter Schickert	Samtvogel	CD	reissue
381	2013	Sal Mineo	Sal Mineo	CD	Xiu Xiu and Eugene S. Robinson
382	2013	Jacob Kirkegaard / Else Marie Pade	Svævninger	LP	
382	2014	Jacob Kirkegaard / Else Marie Pade	Svævninger	CD	includes a bonus track
383	2013	Acid Mothers Temple & The Melting Paraiso U.F.O.	In Search of the Lost Divine Arc	CD	
383	2013	Acid Mothers Temple & The Melting Paraiso U.F.O.	In Search of the Lost Divine Arc	2×LP	
384	2013	Pitreleh	Pitreleh	LP	
384	2023	Pitreleh	Pitreleh	cassette	reissue
385	2013	Nadja & Vampillia	The Perfect World	CD	
385	2013	Nadja & Vampillia	The Perfect World	LP	
386	2013	Master Musicians of Bukkake	Far West	CD	
386	2013	Master Musicians of Bukkake	Far West	LP	
387	2013	Born of Six	Svapiti	CD	
388	2013	Total Life	Radiator	LP	
389	2013	Noveller	No Dreams	CD	
390	2013	Duane Pitre	Bridges	CD	
390	2013	Duane Pitre	Bridges	LP	
391	2013	Duane Pitre	Feel Free: Live at Cafe OTO	LP	
392	2013	Steve Gunn and Mike Gangloff	Melodies for a Savage Fix	LP	
392	2014	Steve Gunn and Mike Gangloff	Melodies for a Savage Fix	CD	
393	2015	Damo Suzuki & Mugstar	Start from Zero	LP	
394	2014	Marisa Anderson	The Golden Hour	CD	reissue
395	2014	Marisa Anderson	Mercury	CD	reissue
396	2013	Emily Jane White	Blood Lines	CD	
397	2014	Stefan Wesołowski	Liebestod	CD	
398	2016	Catherine Christer Hennix	Central Palace Music from 100 Model Subjects for Hegikan Roku	CD	
399	2014	Grateful Dead & John Oswald	Grayfolded	3×LP	reissue
400	2013	Eleh	For Moussavi Atrium	CD	
401	2014	Eleh	Circle Three: Full Moon at 35hz	LP	mailorder only
402	2014	Jeff Burch	Jeff Burch	CD	
403	2014	Acid Mothers Temple & The Melting Paraiso U.F.O.	Astrorgasm from the Inner Space	CD	
403	2014	Acid Mothers Temple & The Melting Paraiso U.F.O.	Astrorgasm from the Inner Space	2×LP	
404	2014	Eleh	Polarizer	LP	mailorder only
404	2022	Eleh	Polarizer 1	cassette	reissue
405	2018	Catherine Christer Hennix	Live at Kremms	LP	mailorder only
406	2014	Else Marie Pade	Electronic Works 1958–1995	2×CD	
406	2014	Else Marie Pade	Electronic Works 1958–1995	3×LP	
407	2015	James Blackshaw	Summoning Suns	CD	
407	2015	James Blackshaw	Summoning Suns	LP	
408	2014	Mark Rogers & Mary Byrne	I Line My Days Along Your Weight	CD	
408	2014	Mark Rogers & Mary Byrne	I Line My Days Along Your Weight	LP	
409	2015	Charlemagne Palestine & Grumbling Fur Time Machine Orchestra	ggrrreeebbbaaammmnnnuuuccckkkaaallloooww!!!	LP	
410	2014	Aidan Baker	Triptychs: Variations on a Melody	CD	
411	2015	Master Musicians of Bukkake	Further West Quad Cult LP	LP	
412	2017	The Mask of the Imperial Family	The Mask of the Imperial Family	LP	reissue
413	2014	Ashley Paul	Heat Source	CD	
414	2015	Maurizio Bianchi	Untitled 1980 / Untitled 2013	CD	reissue with bonus album
415	2015	Francisco López	Untitled #274	CD	
416	2015	Pinkcourtesyphone	Sentimental Something	LP	
417	2015	William Basinski & Richard Chartier	Divertissment	LP	
418	2015	Alessandro Cortini	Forse 3	2×LP	
419	2016	Harry Bertoia	Complete Sonambient Collection	11×CD	compilation
421	2015	Duane Pitre	Bayou Electric	CD	
421	2015	Duane Pitre	Bayou Electric	LP	
422	2015	Kit Wilmans Fegradoe	Issa	CD	
423	2015	Bass Communion / Frans de Waard	Bass Communion / Frans de Waard	LP	split release
424	2015	Matthew Watson & Daniel Thomas Freeman	Catch Me Daddy OST	CD	
425	2015	Acid Mothers Temple & The Melting Paraiso U.F.O.	Benzaiten	CD	
425	2015	Acid Mothers Temple & The Melting Paraiso U.F.O.	Benzaiten	2×LP	
426	2015	Maja S.K. Ratkje / Jon Wesseltoft / Camille Norment / Per Gisle Galåen	Celadon	CD	
427	2015	Bill Horist	Mutei – Music for Davida Monk's Dream Pavilion	CD	
428	2015	Eleh	Polarizer 2	LP	mailorder only
428	2022	Eleh	Polarizer 2	cassette	reissue
429	2015	L A N D	Anoxia	CD	
429	2015	L A N D	Anoxia	LP	
430	2015	Eleh / Tara Jane O'Neil	Eleh / Tara Jane O'Neil	LP	split release
431	2017	Alessandro Cortini and Merzbow	Alessandro Cortini and Merzbow	LP	
432	2016	EMG	Tribute to Harry Bertoia 100th Year Anniversary	LP + DVD	
432	2019	Shasta Cults	Configurations	CD	
433	2015	various artists	New Songs of the Humpback Whale	CD	
434	2016	Catherine Christer Hennix	Live at Issue Project Room	CD	
435	2017	Growing	Disorder	LP	
436	2016	Robin Hayward	Stop Time	CD	
437	2016	Mark Lyken	The Terrestrial Sea	CD	
438	2016	Coil	The New Backwards	CD	reissue
438	2016	Coil	The New Backwards	LP	reissue
439	2016	Acid Mothers Temple & The Melting Paraiso U.F.O.	Wake to the New Dawn of Another Astro Era	CD	
439	2016	Acid Mothers Temple & The Melting Paraiso U.F.O.	Wake to the New Dawn of Another Astro Era	2×LP	
440	2016	Larsen	of Grog Vim	CD	
441	2016	Overtone Ensemble	Overtone Ensemble	CD	
442	2016	Sarah Davachi	Vergers	LP	
443	2019	Phill Niblock	Music for Cello	CD	
444	2016	Eleh	Radiant Intervals I	LP	reissue
445	2019	Eleh	Home Age 2	CD	
447	2017	Jacob Kirkegaard & Niels Lyhne Løkkegaard	Descending	LP	
448	2017	Charlemagne Palestine & Grumbling Fur Time Machine Orchestra	Omminggg and Schlomminggg	LP	
449	2017	Caterina Barbieri	Patterns of Consciousness	LP	
450	2017	Pauline Oliveros & Connie Crothers	Live at the Stone	CD	
451	2017	Christina Kubisch / Eleh	Tesla's Dream / Ohmage/Resistor	LP	split release
452	2019	Extended Organ	Vibe	LP	
453	2020	NYZ	Millz Medz	LP	
454	2017	Eleh	Home Age	LP	
455	2017	Barbez	For Those Who Came After: Songs of Resistance from the Spanish Civil War	CD	
455	2017	Barbez	For Those Who Came After: Songs of Resistance from the Spanish Civil War	LP	
456	2018	WEEED	This	LP	
456	2018	WEEED	This	Cassette	
457	2020	Tod Dockstader	Aerial 1	2×LP	reissue
458	2018	Newaxeyes	Black Fax	LP	
459	2023	Pauline Oliveros	The Well & The Gentle	LP	reissue
460	2018	Caterina Barbieri	Born Again in the Voltage	LP	
461	2018	Caterina Barbieri / Eleh	Bestie Infinite / Wear Patterns	LP	split release
462	2019	Jacob Kirkegaard	Phonurgia Metallis	CD	
463	2018	Acid Mothers Temple & The Melting Paraiso U.F.O.	Hallelujah Mystic Garden Part One	LP	
464	2019	Éliane Radigue	Geelriandre / Arthesis	LP	
466	2018	Alessandro Cortini & Lawrence English	Immediate Horizon	LP	
467	2019	Éliane Radigue	Chry-Ptus	LP	reissue
468	2019	Anthony Burr and Charles Curtis	Chamber Music: Alvin Lucier & Morton Feldman	CD	
469	2019	Alvin Lucier	Orpheus Variations	CD	
470	2019	Pauline Oliveros	Reverberations I	LP	partial reissue
471	2019	Pauline Oliveros & Guy Klucevsek	Sounding / Way	LP	reissue
471	2021	Pauline Oliveros & Guy Klucevsek	Sounding / Way	Cassette	reissue
472	2019	Pauline Oliveros	Tara's Room	LP	reissue
472	2021	Pauline Oliveros	Tara's Room	Cassette	reissue
473	2020	Pauline Oliveros, Stuart Dempster and Panaiotis	Deep Listening	LP	reissue
473	2021	Pauline Oliveros, Stuart Dempster and Panaiotis	Deep Listening	CD	reissue
473	2021	Pauline Oliveros, Stuart Dempster and Panaiotis	Deep Listening	Cassette	reissue
474	2019	Acid Mothers Temple & The Melting Paraiso U.F.O.	Hallelujah Mystic Garden Part Two	LP	
475	2019	Jacob Kirkegaard	Black Metal Square	LP	
476	2019	Jessica Ekomane	Multivocal	LP	
477	2020	Eleh / NYZ	Eleh / NYZ	LP	split release
479	2020	Ned Lagin	Seastones Set 4 and Set 5	LP	
480	2019	Shasta Cults	Shasta Cults	LP	
482	2019	Suishou no Fune	The Lost Trees of Paradise	LP	
483	2020	Maja S. K. Ratkje	Mara	LP	picture disc
484	2020	Eleh	Harmonic Twins	LP	
485	2023	Stuart Dempster	Underground Overlays From the Cistern Chapel	2×LP	reissue
486	2021	Eleh	Snoweight	CD	
486	2021	Eleh	Snoweight	LP	
486	2021	Eleh	Snoweight	Cassette	
487	2021	Niels Lyhne Løkkegaard	Saturations	LP	
488	2021	Alessandro Cortini	Forse	4×CD	
489	2021	Overtone Ensemble	2	CD	
490	2020	David First & The Western Enisphere	The Consummation of Right and Wrong	3×CD	
491	2020	Alina Kalancea	Impedance	CD	
491	2020	Alina Kalancea	Impedance	LP	
492	2022	Alvin Lucier & Jordan Dykstra	Out of Our Hands	LP	
493	2023	Gregory Kramer	Veils of Transformation 1972–1980	cassette	
493	2023	Gregory Kramer	Veils of Transformation 1972–1980	CD	
494	2022	Tod Dockstader	Aerial II	2×LP	reissue
497	2021	Éliane Radigue	Opus 17	2×CD	reissue
498	2023	Éliane Radigue	11 Dec 1980	2×CD	
499	2021	Saint Abdullah	To Live A La West Pt. 1	CD	
500	2021	various artists	The Harmonic Series Volume 2	3×LP	
501	2021	Duane Pitre	Omniscient Voices	LP	
502	2022	Tony Rolando	Breakin' Is a Memory	LP	
503	2023	Wanderwelle	All Hands Bury the Cliffs at Sea	LP	
504	2023	Alina Kalancea	Alchemy	cassette	
506	2023	Razen	Postcards From Hereafter	CD	
507	2022	Wanderwelle	Black Clouds Above the Bows	CD	
508	2023	Parish	Cascades of Refinement	CD	
508	2023	Parish	Cascades of Refinement	cassette	
509	2023	Alina Kalancea	Letters Never Sent	CD	
510	2022	Merzbow	Material Action 2 N-A-M	CD	reissue
511	2022	Merzbow + Arcane Device	Merzbow + Arcane Device	CD	
512	2023	Silver Apples & Makoto Kawabata	Mirage	LP	
513	2021	Lambda Sond	Waglands 1921	cassette	
514	2023	Alvin Lucier	One Arm Bandits	CD	reissue
516	2022	JD Emmanuel	Rain Forest Music	cassette	reissue
517	2022	JD Emmanuel	Trance Formations 1: Ancient Minimal Meditations	cassette	reissue
521	2023	Duane Pitre	Varolii Patterns	cassette	
522	2023	Quintron / NYZ	Weather Music	cassette	split release
523	2022	Larsen / Alessandro Sciaraffa	Golden Leaf	CD	
524	2024	Christina Kubisch & Trondheim Voices	Stromsänger 2022: For Six Voices and Electromagnetic Waves	LP	
525	2024	Stephen Ruppenthal & Gary R. Weisberg	Strange Times	CD	
526	2023	Alexandre Bazin	Therapy	cassette	
527	2023	Zak Riles	Earthwave	cassette	
531	2024	Niels Lyhne Løkkegaard & Quatuor Bozzini	Colliding Bubbles	CD	
533	2024	Acid Mothers Temple & The Melting Paraiso U.F.O.	Trust Masked Replicants	LP	
535	2024	Michael Ranta	Transits Volume 1	CD	
538	2024	Meredith Young-Sowers	Agartha: Personal Meditation Music	7×CD	reissue

== Cassauna catalog ==
All releases are cassettes printed in first editions of 50, with subsequent editions of 25 printed to fill reserved orders.

Note: All catalog numbers are prefixed with "SAUNA".

Cat.	Date	Artist	Title
001	2011	Deceh	4
002	2011	Pauline Oliveros & Michael T. Bullock	Accordion to Bass
003	2011	Deceh	3
004	2011	Ryan Gregory Tallman	Haunted Tapes
005	2011	Maurizio Bianchi	Organemia
006	2011	Ellen Fullman & Friends	Secret Spirit House
007	2011	Lambda Sond	Chronological Compression
008	2011	Greg Davis	States 1
009	2011	Hakobune	Words Left Behind on Ashes
010	2011	Aki Onda	First Thought Best Thought
011	2011	Conrad Schnitzler	00-767
012	2011	Richard Lainhart	Lux
013	2012	John Bischoff	Field Transfer
014	2012	Arnold Dreyblatt	Turntable History: Spin Ensemble
015	2014	Randy Gibson	The First Pillar Appearing in Supernova
016	2014	Zachary James Watkins	Moveable
017	2014	Sarah Davachi	August Harp
018	2014	Claudio Rocchetti & Pietro Riparbelli	Three Quarter Tone Piano Pieces
019	2014	Lambda Sond	Chronological Compression II
020	2014	Juan Carlos Vasquez	Collages
021	2014	Ashley Paul	White Night
022	2014	Caterina Barbieri	Vertical
023	2014	Thomas Barriere	Primaire
024	2014	Alberto Boccardi	Fingers
025	2015	Céleste Boursier-Mougenot	From Here to Ear
026	2015	David Burraston	T.H. Cycle
027	2016	Adam Basanta	A Room Listening to Itself
028	2016	Steven R. Smith, Dirk Serries	Hymnal
029	2016	Emiliano Romanelli	Tabulatura (Volume 1)
030	2016	Theresa Wong and Søren Kjærgaard	Layered Events
031	2016	Robin Hayward	Rubble Master
032	2017	Roberto Carlos Lange	Cutups
036	2016	Overtone Ensemble	Longitudes
038	2017	Matthias Urban	Dialoge____Gideon's Disease
040	2016	Koen Holtkamp	Gong Solo
041	2018	Tom Eaton	SPICA/ACIPS
042	2018	David Burraston	Wagga Ham Shack
043	2018	QST	2023
044	2018	Perhaps	V & 4
045	2018	Florian T M Zeisig	You Look So Serious
046	2019	Rosalind Hall	Drift
047	2019	Eleh	Floating Frequencies/Intuitive Synthesis I
048	2019	Eleh	Floating Frequencies/Intuitive Synthesis II
049	2019	Eleh	Floating Frequencies/Intuitive Synthesis III
050	2019	Eleh	Floating Frequencies/Intuitive Synthesis IV
052	2020	NYZ	MILLZ EXPZ
053	2020	Aki Onda	Rupture
054	2020	Jana Irmert	Flood
055	2020	Alexandre Bazin	Oceans / Dream-Land
057	2020	Eleh	Home Age
058	2020	Akhira Sano	Penetrating, for Filtration
059	2021	Rose Bolton	The Lost Clock
060	2021	Sahba Sizdahkhani	Ganj
061	2021	Jeff Burch	Samūm Suite
062	2021	Rama Parwata	Tekanan
063	2022	Atsuko Hatano	Cells #2
064	2021	Atsuko Hatano	Cells #5
065	2022	Alexandre Bazin	Percussion-Resonance
066	2021	Tony Rolando	Old Cool Echoes
067	2021	Saint Abdullah	To Live a la West II
068	2022	Machinefabriek	Texturalis
069	2021	Brian Thummler	Ghost Birds
070	2023	mHz	Proof of Identity
072	2023	Emiliano Romanelli	Tabulatura (Volume 2)
072	2023	Francesco Gennari	Frammenti
073	2022	Tony Rolando	Shared System
074	2023	José Orozco Mora	Sucesiones
075	2023	Atsuko Hatano	Insulated Paradise
