= Hala Strana =

21st C. recording project for traditional Eastern European music

- Origin: Los Angeles, California
- Genres: Experimental rock; psychedelic folk; psychedelic rock; folk music
- Years active: 2002–2007
- Labels: Jewelled Antler, Emperor Jones, Soft Abuse, Music Fellowship, Worstward Recordings

Hala Strana (translated from the Old Bulgarian which mean "salted shore") is the name of a recording project of American musician Steven R. Smith. Smith began recording under the name in 2002 as an outlet which allowed him to explore the traditional music of Eastern Europe more fully than possible with his solo work. Although numerous musicians have contributed to the project, including Glenn Donaldson, Loren Chasse, and Darren Ankenman, most Hala Strana recordings are solo productions. His recordings have included such diverse instruments as hurdy-gurdy, bouzouki, harmonium, spike fiddles, bulbul tarang, the optigan keyboard, xaphoon, and field recordings. Hala Strana's releases have featured arrangements of traditional music from Hungary, Romania, Croatia, Albania, Ukraine and Bulgaria as well as original music influenced by the music of these areas. Hala Strana has recorded for a number of independent labels such as Soft Abuse, Last Visible Dog, Jewelled Antler, and Emperor Jones.

== Discography ==
- Karst E.P. – 3”CDr (Jewelled Antler, 2003)
- Hala Strana – CD (Emperor Jones, 2003), LP (Desastre, 2017)
- Fielding – 2xCDr (Jewelled Antler, 2003), 2xCD (Last Visible Dog, 2004), 2xLP (Worstward/Desastre 2020)
- These Villages – CD (Soft Abuse, 2004)
- White Sleep - 7" lathe cut (Soft Abuse, 2006)
- Heave the Gambrel Roof - LP/CD (Music Fellowship, 2007)
- Compendium - DL (Worstward Recordings, 2011)
- Hala Strana Boxset - 5xCS box set (Cabin Floor Esoterica, 2014)
