= Just Another Band from the Cosmic Inferno =

Studio album by Acid Mothers Temple & The Cosmic Inferno
- Released: July 19, 2005
- Recorded: January 2005
- Genre: Psychedelic rock, space rock, experimental
- Label: Important Records

Acid Mothers Temple & The Cosmic Inferno chronology
Just Another Band from the Cosmic Inferno (2005)	Anthem of the Space (2005)

Just Another Band from the Cosmic Inferno is an album by the band Acid Mothers Temple & The Cosmic Inferno.

== Track listing ==
No.	Title	Length
1.	"Trigger In Trigger Out"	20:17
2.	"They're Coming From The Cosmic Inferno"	43:55

== Personnel ==
- Tabata Mitsuru : bass, vocals, maratab
- Higashi Hiroshi : electronics, dancin' king
- Shimura Koji : drums, Latino cool
- Okano Futoshi : drums, god speed
- Kawabata Makoto : guitars, speed guru

produced & engineered by Kawabata Makoto

=== Guests ===
- Tiffany : erotic whisper
