= Valerio Cosi =

- Born: Valerio Cosi; February 7, 1985 (age 41)
- Origin: Taranto, Italy
- Genres: Electronic; Psychedelia; free jazz; Krautrock; Industrial music
- Occupations: Musician, composer
- Labels: Porter Records; Dreamsheep; Digitalis; Preservation; A Silent Place; Last Visible Dog; Black Horizons
- Website: Facebook

Valerio Cosi (February 7, 1985 in Taranto) is an Italian saxophonist/multi-instrumentalist. His works have roots in the electronic music genre and contain several elements of free-jazz, krautrock, industrial music, psychedelia and folk music.

== Biography ==
In 2006, Cosi's first record called "Immortal Attitudes" appeared on Digitalis Industries's sub-label Foxglove. Between the years 2006-2009 he had many of his solo and collaborative works released on CD-R, CD and LP: "Pulga Loves You" on Fire Museum Records (a collaboration with Vanessa Rossetto, called Pulga), "The Three Faces Of Moongod" (Ruralfaune), "Conference Of The Aquarians" (recorded with Enzo Franchini) on Last Visible Dog, two albums with the Italian electronic musician Fabio Orsi ("We Could For Hours" and "Thoughts Melt In The Air") on A Silent Place and Preservation, a split 7-inch with Italian experimental duo My Cat Is An Alien, the trilogy of "Freedom Meditation Music" on Ruby Red Editora/Oneiros/Students Of Decay and the acclaimed work "Heavy Electronic Pacific Rock" on Digitalis Industries. He also toured Europe playing with several artists, including the Portuguese band Os Loosers, and opened shows for Caribou (musician). Cosi's musical work also gained attention from the international music press like The Wire and Pitchfork. In 2009, Cosi signed a 5-years contract with Porter Records (USA), which released his first compilation of solo material called "Collected Works".

In 2013 La Repubblica included his figure in an article about "the 10 Italian underground musicians you absolutely have to know". In 2014 he has published an LP called "Plays Popol Vuh" on Dreamsheep.
