= Mountainhood =

American singer-songwriter

Michael Curtis Hilde, also known as Mountainhood (born October 18, 1981 in Northern California), is an American singer, songwriter, visual artist, and novelist.

== Biography ==
Prior to performing and recording as Mountainhood, Hilde was at various times known as Almaden, Almaden Wood, and the Transplendence XIV – taking the name from the mercury mining town where Hilde grew up, a place where Hells Angels and farmers lived. Though style and genre shift from album to album, it has been written that "This is introverted music played as the blues should be."

While operating in San Francisco, Hilde curated and performed at a monthly gathering called "The Story". With posters painted by Hilde and visual artist Arik Roper, The Story outlined a new school made up of folk singers and drone groups where "each performer adds a bit to a running narrative during their set." The Story is still going on in New York. Another one happened in 2009. Yet another chapter occurred in Portland, 2010.

The California series took place at the Stork Club in Oakland, and followed in the footsteps of Hilde's San Siern Holyoake & Wood Festival at the Hotel Utah in San Francisco, May 2007, touted as "A Holy Sunday Gathering of the Brightest in New Folk Music from the Length of California".

For Chapter XIII of The Story, Hilde organized the Arthurdesh festival to benefit the counterculture journal Arthur magazine at Market Hotel. A week later, he organized the first See-In.

Michael Curtis Hilde first began writing and recording while living in the Big Sur redwoods.

His first official release (as Almaden) appeared in Finland on the forest-folk imprint 267 Lattajjaa, bearing an album title of over fifty words ending in "Blessedhood".

Mountainhood signed to Time Lag Records in 2008.

== Discography ==
- Mountainhood – Letters from the Forest of Nisene Marks – October 2014 (Gnome Life)
- Mountainhood – Spagyric – October 2013 (Gnome Life)
- Mountainhood – America 2 or Nahuel Huapa: A Saga The Intense Vibes of the Rainbow A Tale of Transformation of my Brother – October 2011 (Dead Pilot UK)
- Mountainhood – Owlland: The VHS Album – January 2011 (Important Records)
- Mountainhood – The Boat-Maker's Daughter – November 2010 (Blackburn Recordings)
- Mountainhood – Fox Wedding Morning – August 2010 (Perhaps Transparent Records)
- Mountainhood – Shine Shine – May 2010 (The Spooky Town)
- Mountainhood – Variable Titles / Live at Deerborn House – February 2010 (Reverb Worship)
- Mountainhood – The Road: Part 2 in the Multivisorial Dreamsaga called: The Light – October 2009 (Important Records)
- Mountainhood – Deathpod – October 2009 (Blackest Rainbow Records)
- Mountainhood – Thunderpaint the Stone Horse Electric – April 16, 2009 (Time Lag)
- Mountainhood – Wings from a Storm – April 16, 2009 (Time Lag)
- Mountainhood – Art Editions – 2LP ??? 2009 (Time Lag)
- Mountainhood – White Banquet: Live at the Story Chapter I – February 16, 2009 (Reverb Worship)
- Mountainhood – Goldeness (being part 1 in the multivisorial dream saga called "The Light") – December 21, 2008 (Ecstatic Yod Collective)
- Mountainhood - Brother the Cloud – February 1, 2008 (Reverb Worship)
- Mountainhood – Year of the Mountain – January 1, 2008 (Reverb Worship)
- Almaden – Come On, Do the Monster Mash – September 1, 2007 (Deep White Sound)
- Almaden – The Dream Continues in 1,000,000 Roads as the Journeyman Slumbers to be Awoken by the Berries of Air and Forest, a Dawn Pre-Imagined and so Owned in Footstep and Deed as Our Lovely Sojourner of Unabysmal Light Sojourns 4th into Willowy and Totally Purple Dawning, Day is Upon r Hero and the Golden Rd. of Infinitudinous Blessedhood – August 1, 2007 (267 Lattajjaa)
- Almaden - s/t – October 1, 2006 (Private Press)

== The Story ==
- Chapter XIV: Priya Zara's Sweet Revenge upon the Population of Ravana-Than-Gur (An Angel's Silence in 6 Acts) – Mountainhood, Bird By Snow, Ilyas Ahmed, I believe in Sunshine, Pioneer, Plankton Wat. July 6, 2010. The Woods, Portland, Oregon
- Chapter XIII: Arthurdesh – MV + EE, Peter Stampfel (Holy Modal Rounders) and the Ether Frolic Mob, Jack Rose, Jana Hunter & TJO, quad (Helen Rush, PG Six, Samara Lubelski, Bob Bannister), Sharon van etten, Mountainhood, Headdress, White Hills. Readings by Byron Coley, Louise Landis Levi, Angela Jaeger, Gary Panter, Wesley Eisold & Max Morton, Robbie Snyderman. Visuals by Flying Andes. Production by Todd P. February 28, 2009. Market Hotel, Bushwick, Brooklyn, New York
- Chapter XII: Blisses – Marissa Nadler, mv & ee, Mountainhood. Presented by Todd P. February 27, 209. Lutheran Church of the Messiah, Greenpoint, Brooklyn, New York
- Chapter XI: Auroras (Sister Show) – Rio En Medio, Avocet, The Lickets. DJ Black Lodge, Visuals by Jon Porras. January 3, 2009. Hemlock Tavern, San Francisco, Calif.
- Chapter XI: Auroras (Brother Show) – Mountainhood, Noa Babayof, Mestre. Reading by Robert Snyderman, DJ Lightning Softpaw, Live Aurora Borealis visuals by Lux December 9, 2008. Zebulon, Williamsburg, Brooklyn, New York
- Chapter X: Adam – Sean Smith, Mountainhood, Ms. Chameleon, Elm. DJ Feather. July 29, 2008. The Stork Club, Oakland, Calif.
- Chapter IX: Infinyte Splendour of the Immaculate Starblest Mynd – Avocet, Wymond and His Spirit Children, Mountainhood, Oaxacan. DJ Black Lodge. June 10, 2008. The Stork Club, Oakland, Calif.
- Chapter VIII: The Light – Mountainhood, Whysp, Aaron Ross, Elms. DJ Black Lodge. May 13, 2008. The Stork Club, Oakland, Calif.
- Chapter VII: Grow Your Hair – Bird By Snow, Mountainhood, Birds Fled from Me, Mountain Animal Hospital. DJ Black Lodge. April 8, 2008. The Stork Club, Oakland, Calif.
- Chapter VI: White Witch – Sean Smith, Mountainhood, Wymond and His Spirit Children, The Sarees, USAforLSD. DJs Sorcery Bird and Black Lodge. March 11, 2008. The Stork Club, Oakland, Calif.
- Chapter V: Love Wins - Colossal Yes, Benjamin Oak Goodman, Alina Hardin, Almaden, Misty Mountain (solo acoustic, N. Emmert of Mammatus), Joseph Childress, Telepathik Friend. DJs Sorcery Bird and Black Lodge. February 12, 2008. The Stork Club, Oakland, Calif.
- Chapter IV: Gathering of the Tribes – Mariee Sioux, Emily Jane White, Almaden, Thunderstones II. DJs Sorcery Bird and Black Lodge. January 8, 2008. The Stork Club, Oakland, Calif.
- Chapter III: Journey to the Mountain – Aaron Ross, Mass at Dawn, Almaden, Cody Coyote, Gregg Kowalsky, Bird By Snow. Lecturer: Erik Davis. DJ sets by Sorcery Bird and Friends. December 11, 2007. The Stork Club, Oakland, Calif.
- Chapter II: Emanations (A Night of Dark Twang and Astral Sojourney) – Lazarus, Almaden, Cabinet of Natural Curiosities, David Enos, Thunderstones II. DJ sets by Sorcery Bird and Friends. November 27, 2007. The Stork Club, Oakland, Calif.
- Chapter I: White Banquet – Mountain Bride, Almaden, Frank Lyon. DJ sets by Angela and Willis. The Stork Club, Oakland, Calif.
