= Optigan =

Electronic keyboard instrument

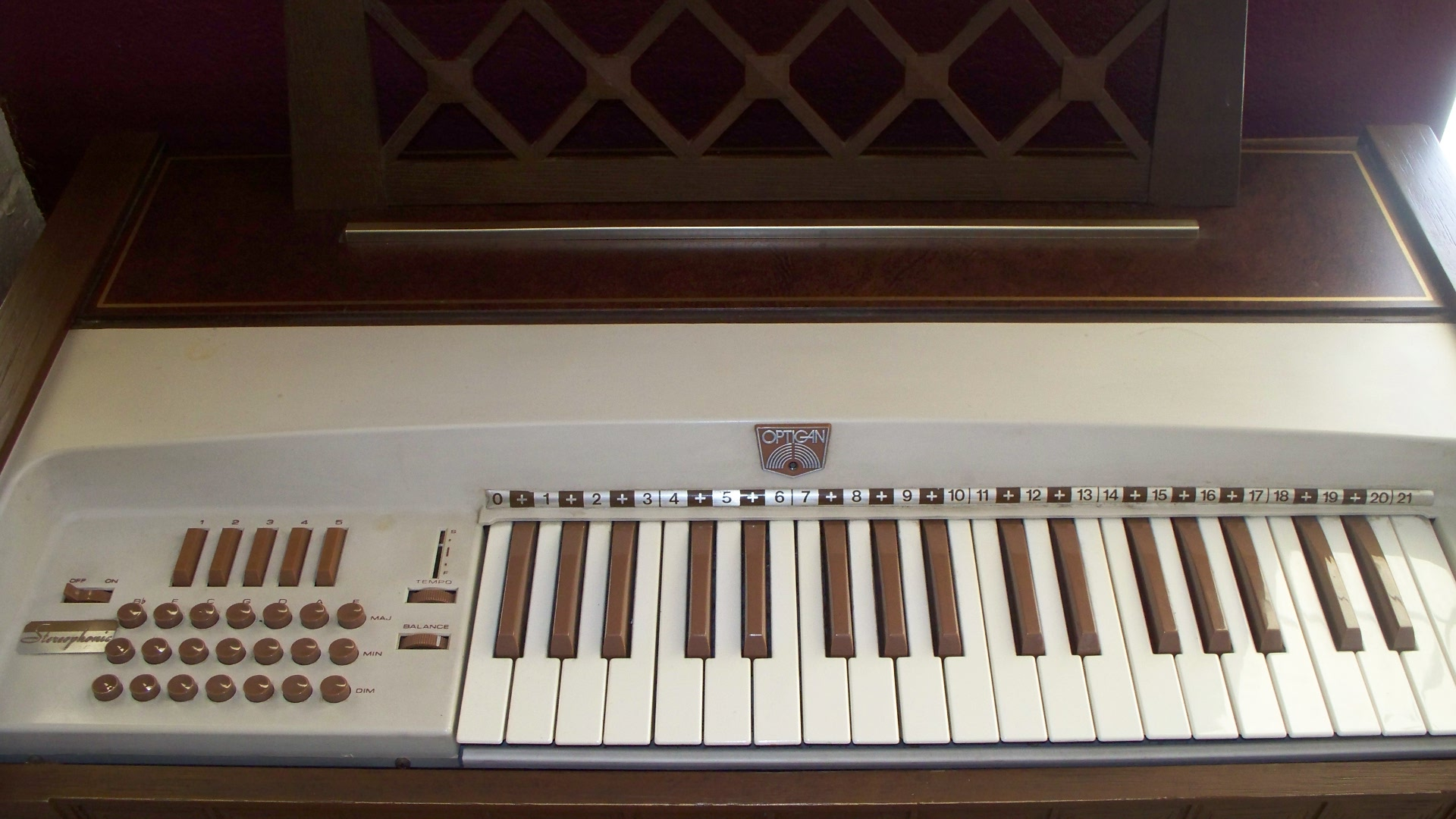
Keyboard overview of a model 35002 Optigan. The coded strip above the main keyboard corresponded to numbers in the music books for those unable to read music.

The Optigan (a portmanteau of optical organ) is an electronic keyboard instrument designed for the consumer market. The name stems from the instrument's reliance on pre-recorded optical soundtracks to reproduce sound. Later versions (built under license and aimed at the professional market) were sold under the name Orchestron.

== Production history ==
Engineering work on the project began in 1968 and the first patents issued in 1970. The Optigan was released in 1971 by Optigan Corporation, a subsidiary of toy manufacturer Mattel, Incorporated of El Segundo, California with the manufacturing plant located nearby in Compton, California. At least one TV commercial from the era featured the Optigan demonstrated by actor Carl Betz (best known for his role as the father on The Donna Reed Show). The Optigan was promoted in at least one Sears-Roebuck catalog. All rights to the Optigan, the disc format, and all previous discs were sold in 1973 to Miner Industries of New York City, an organ manufacturer who formed a subsidiary, Opsonar, to produce it. Miner had record sales for a time, in part due to Opsonar. However, sales declined shortly thereafter and production of the Optigan and its discs ceased in 1976.

== Appearance and construction ==
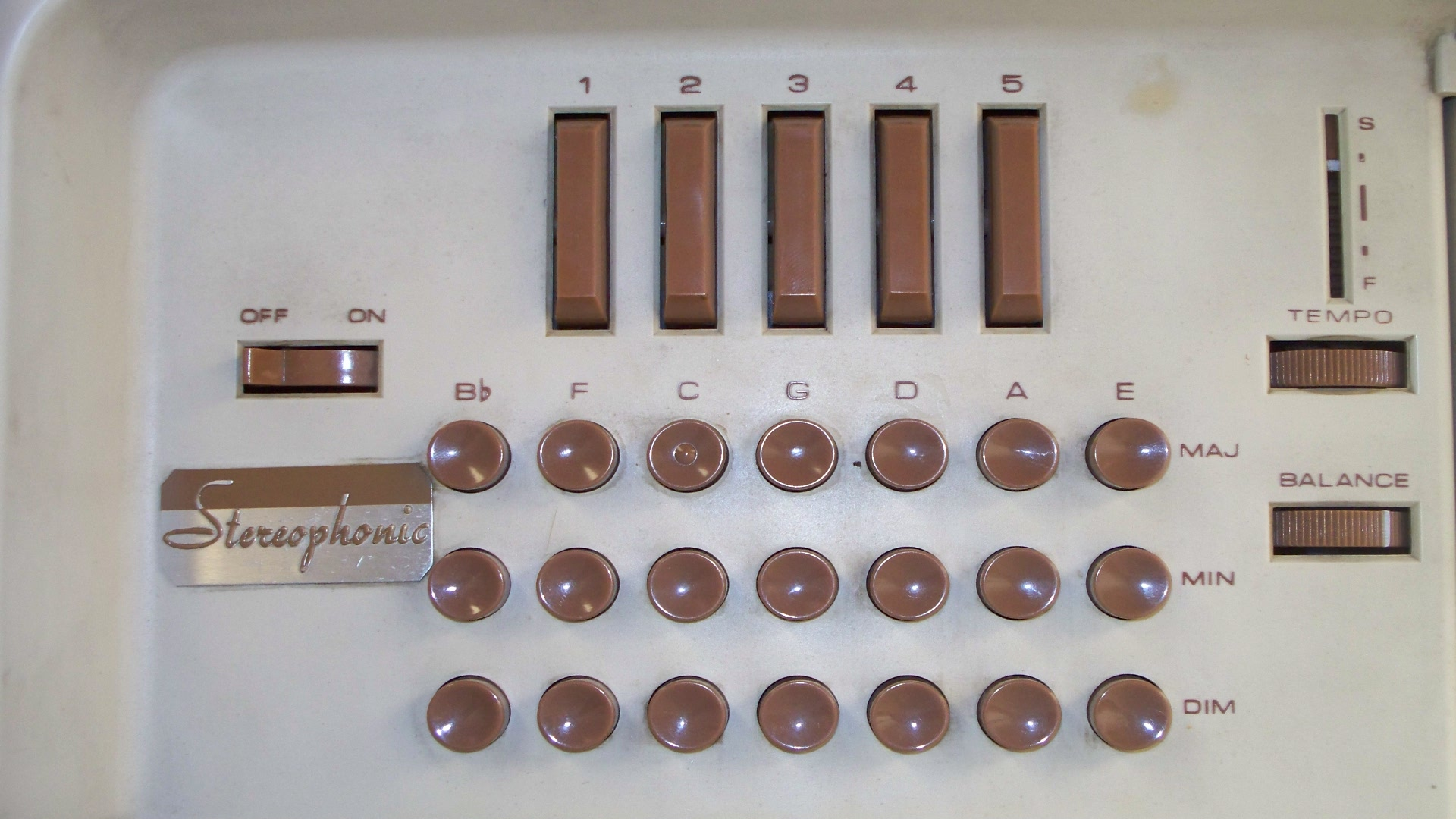
Detail of the Optigan's chord buttons, special effect rocker switches, power switch, tempo adjustment wheel and stereo balance wheel. The adhesive-backed metal "Stereophonic" trim plate covers the unused reverb control opening on this example

The Optigan looked like a scaled-down version of the electronic organs of the day. The various cabinet designs and their matching benches were simulated wood made out of a molded plastic the manufacturer dubbed "Temperite" and finished with matching speaker grille cloth and occasionally reverb units inside the unit. A mechanical reverb unit and cabinetry with genuine wood veneer were available as extra-cost options; the control for the reverb on units so equipped is located below the power switch. Non-reverb-equipped Optigans feature a metal plate which reads "Stereophonic" in relief to hide the unused opening. Reverb-equipped units had a slightly different plate which read "REVERB Stereophonic" affixed immediately to the left of the rocker switches and above the power switch. According to optigan.com, two piano bar prototypes were produced. The Optigan played in stereo through two solid-state amplifiers with the right-hand keyboard assigned to the instrument's right channel and the chords and effects assigned to the left.

== The optical disc format ==
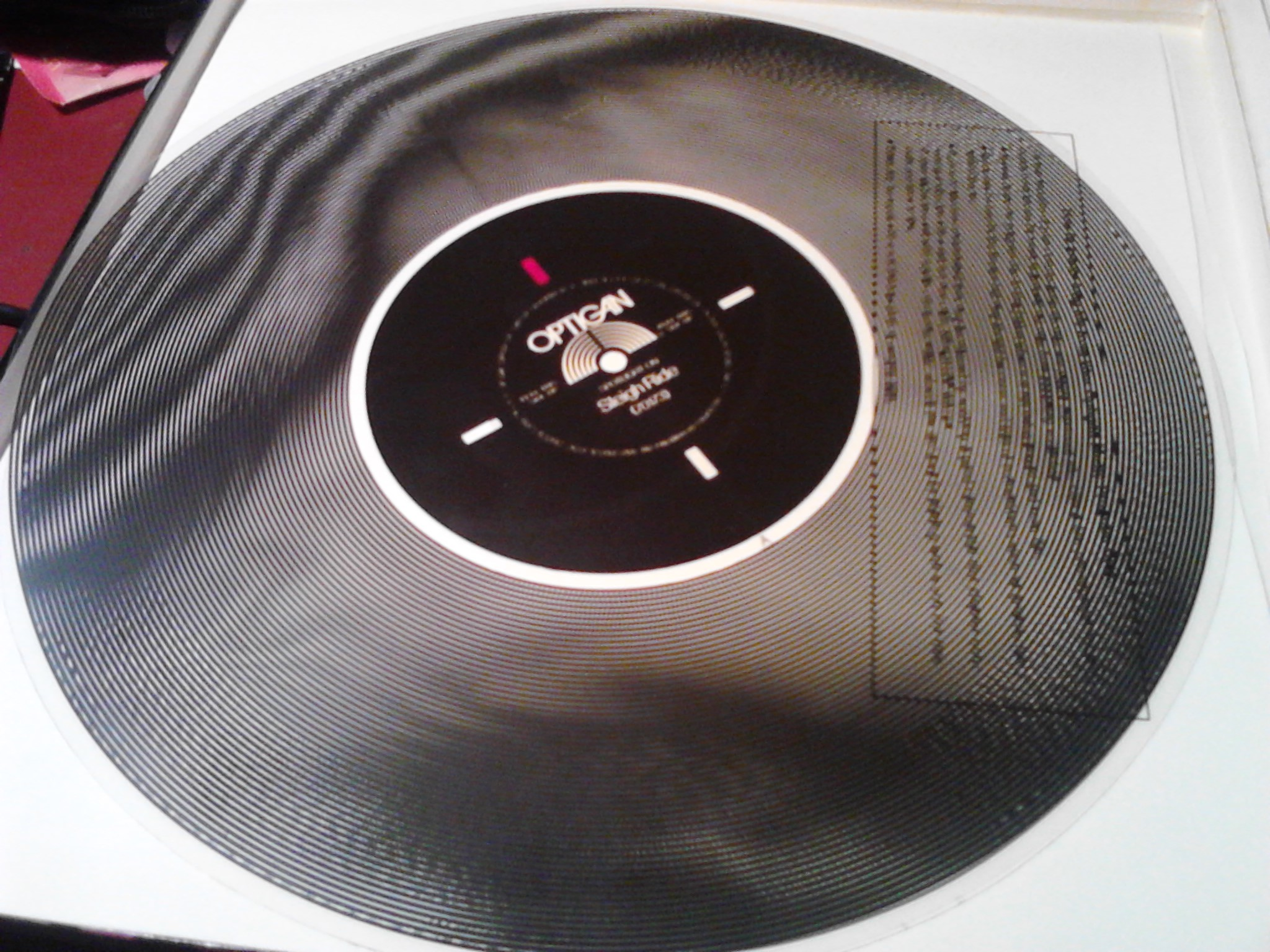
An Optigan Program Disc

Cover art of box containing Program Discs

The Optigan's playback system functioned much like the storage and reading of an optical soundtrack as was used in motion pictures, using a light bulb to energize a row of photodiodes on the opposite side of spinning, 12"-diameter clear plastic film discs (officially referred to as "Program Discs") were encoded with fifty-seven concentric optical tracks. The system translated the analog waveforms on the disc to an audio signal. A flip-down door beneath the keyboard allowed access to the disc's loading area to the left of the unit and a disc storage area to the right. Program discs were loaded by simply sliding them onto the felt-covered platform; a V-shaped notch on the front of the panel aided in alignment. When power was applied and the front cover closed, a spindle engaged the center hole of the disc and a motor-driven idler wheel spun the disc on the spindle. The power switch itself was mechanically linked to the disc's drive system; lowering the front panel dropped the spindle and disconnected power to the instrument, allowing the program discs to be changed without the need to fully power down. A broad, flat, white plastic cleaning tool with a purple, simulated velvet cleaning surface was supplied with each Optigan to allow periodic cleaning of the photoelectric cell, located near the rear of the instrument.

Thirty-seven tracks were sustained or repeatedly percussive notes in the timbre of a particular instrument and were played through a standard three-octave piano-style keyboard with the right hand; twenty-one were of a live band or soloist playing chords in different keys arranged per the circle of fifths, specifically B♭, F, C, G, D, A and E major, minor, and diminished and were played with the left hand in much the style of a chord organ or accordion. The remaining five were assigned to rocker switches above the chord buttons and featured (depending on the disc in question) percussion, sound effects, introductions, vamps, and endings synchronized with the chord buttons. Pushing upward on the rocker switches locked them in place for use with percussion; pushing downward allowed momentary use for vamps, introductions and endings.

Cover of the beginner's music book shipped with each new Optigan. Despite the mention on the cover, no disc with the sound of a sitar was ever offered

Not all of the chord buttons had their own track assignments, the result being only fifty-seven sounds on sixty-three buttons, keys and switches. There was also an optical metronome incorporated into the discs which showed as a red flashing light for the downbeat and white for the upbeats inside the Optigan badge above the keyboard. The advantages of this unique optical playback system were that the Optigan's range of timbres was infinitely expandable and that there was no limit on the duration of a note as there was on the Optigan's professional-grade counterpart, the magnetic tape-based Chamberlin or its successor the Mellotron. The disadvantage was that notes could have neither attack nor decay, as the tracks had no specific beginning or end.

The "Starter Set" sold with the Optigan contained discs with fairly self-explanatory titles: "Big Organ & Drums", "Pop Piano Plus Guitar", "Latin Fever", and "Guitar in 3/4 Time". More modern styles were represented by titles such as "Movin'!", which was a rhythm and blues disc and "Hear and Now", with a sound clearly based on the hit single "Sweet Seasons" by Carole King (and cover art evocative of that of her Tapestry (1971) album). Other discs were marketed individually and packaged much like long-playing phonograph records. These individual titles were also bundled in much the same way as the "Starter Set" and sold as six-disc "Entertainment Folios". Some discs were available only as part of a two-disc "Style Pak" with titles such as "The Joyous Sounds of Christmas", "Country Style Pak", "Polka" and "Songs of Praise", these last two being produced towards the end of production and in very low quantities. Music books of various styles and even arrangements intended for individual disks were also available and sometimes packaged with the different bundles.

The initial run of musical tracks were recorded by Southern California studio musicians in Hollywood and Torrance. However, a musicians' union strike meant that some of the later discs were recorded in Germany. The instrumental tracks for one disc, "Bluegrass Banjo", were recorded by members of the Nitty Gritty Dirt Band. The Vox Humana disc keyboard sound was used for the "Vocal Choir" Orchestron disc.

For the benefit of those unable to read music, the notes in the books were numbered in correspondence to a numbered and color-coded foil strip above the keyboard. The Optigan's songbooks were written and arranged by Optigan Corporation's music director, Johnny Largo. Largo, an accordionist and session musician, was a contemporary of Johnny Marks, a composer best known for his popular mid-20th century Christmas melodies. As such, many of the songs in the Christmas books were Marks compositions.

== Problems ==
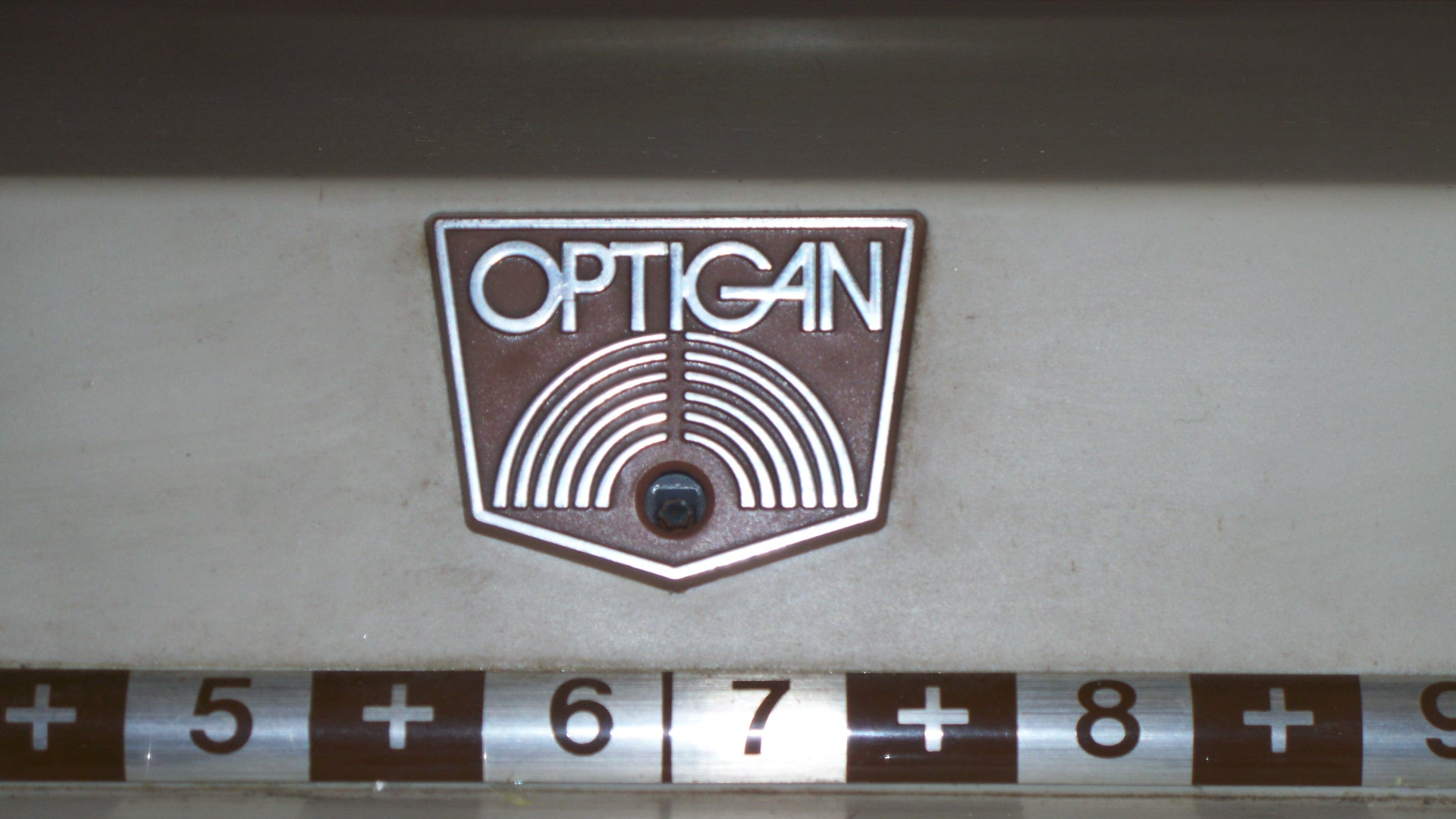
Optigan badge with its optical metronome seen as the circular object beneath the arches of the trademark

Despite its use of recordings of actual musical instruments instead of internally generated sounds, the Optigan suffered from poor tonal quality due not only to the bandwidth limitations of its optical system, but its mechanical system as well. The Optigan concept was similar to that of the Mellotron (early sampling technology), but while the Mellotron used magnetic tape, the Optigan borrowed its technology from motion-picture optical soundtrack technology and its amplitude-modulated format.

The disc could be sped up or slowed down using a thumbwheel next to the chord buttons to cause a corresponding change in tempo and pitch; however, higher speeds tended to roll off the lower frequencies, lower speeds rolled off the highs, and moderate to slow tempo lent a slightly muddy quality overall. Natural imperfections on the acetate discs, as well as dust and dirt, came through as scratches, clicks and pops, much like a worn phonograph record. Furthermore, the pitch change brought on by the tempo adjustment made session work with live musicians a difficult proposition, especially since the pitch varied greatly from disc to disc.

Even though the technology of the day was more than sophisticated enough to avoid them, there were numerous mechanical problems with the disc's motor drive due to its having been engineered to be as affordable as possible. Changes in environment, which had a physical effect on the photocells, frequently led to crosstalk between tracks. One common example involves the F at the upper end of the keyboard: press this key, step on the volume control pedal, and the C-diminished/A-diminished chord can often be heard in the background.

These same diminished chords intentionally found their way onto the row of major chords. As pointed out earlier in this article, not all of the chord buttons had their own track assignments. In a very unusual move, A-major utilizes the same soundtrack as B♭-diminished, G-diminished, and E-diminished, while E-major shares space with F-diminished and D-diminished, thereby making it impossible to play in the keys of A or E, at least with left-hand accompaniment. Apparently, this was done to save space on the disc, further explaining the lack of dominant seventh chords or any chords in the keys of E♭, A♭, D♭, B and F♯.

Cover of the 1972 Everything Is Beautiful songbook. As the name suggests, it was filled with arrangements of the soft popular music of the day.

Since the instrument was aimed at amateur players, the majority of the songs in the Optigan's music books are written in the much simpler keys of F, C and G.

== Vako Orchestron ==
Vako Synthesizers Incorporated was founded by electronic instrument pioneer David Van Koevering, who built licensed versions of the Optigan under the name Orchestron in the mid-1970s. Intended for professional use as an alternative to the Mellotron, the Orchestron featured improved recorded sounds over the Optigan. Some models included sequencers and synthesizers. While the same fidelity limitations of the Optigan applied to the Orchestron, these instruments were built to be more reliable and were used successfully in commercial recordings.

== Use in the music industry ==
Regardless of its limitations and its problems with pitch, many notable musicians have used the Optigan or, more likely, samples of the instrument if the recordings are made after the year 2000. These musicians include Trace, I Dont Know How but They Found Me, Steve Hackett, Third Eye Blind, The Clash, Elvis Costello, Jon Brion, Blur, Marco Benevento, Fiona Apple, Crash Test Dummies, Kraftwerk (Orchestron), Coil, Money Mark, Ani DiFranco, Michael Penn, Steve Fisk, Tom Waits, Marilyn Manson, Nan Vernon, Hala Strana, TISM, Thinking Fellers Union Local 282, The Real Tuesday Weld, King Princess, Them Crooked Vultures, C418, Unwound, Sparklehorse and Mark Mothersbaugh of Devo—who mixed in parts of the "Banjo Sing-Along" disc on a later remix of Devo's 1981 single, "Beautiful World".

The earliest recording that used an Optigan was an album by electronic music pioneer Bruce Haack. On his 1973 release Captain Entropy, Haack extensively used the Optigan, utilizing several Optigan disks such as "Nashville Country" for the track "Army Ants" and "Singing Rhythm" for the track "Walking Eagle". The album was recorded in his bedroom studio and released on his own Dimension 5 Records, a label releasing children's records from 1962 through 1977.

Another early recording that used the Optigan was an album by European dance music pioneer Alan Steward. On his 1976 live album Just Listen, Alan made extensive use of the Optigan. Six of the nine tracks on the album, including the title track, feature the Optigan. Alan also extensively used the "breakbeats" and the samples of the Hammond B3 organ that were part of the backing tracks found on many of the soul- and R&B-oriented Optigan discs. The European distributor of the Optigan used Alan Steward's album for promotion and in-store demos.

Steve Hackett has also frequently used the Optigan. Hackett's 1980 album, Defector, features an unusual number called "Sentimental Institution", recorded with a solo Optigan spinning the "Big Band Beat" disc behind singer Peter Hicks' vocals. Hackett made use of all five of that disc's vamps and its ending; that particular disc featured no percussion tracks. On his Live Archive: 70s (2001), featuring a performance from 1979, he plays a surrealistically silly interlude on the instrument (introducing it as "the most tasteless thing I could possibly do"). His 2003 release, To Watch the Storms, features sonically expanded samples of the Opsonar "Champagne Music" disc on the track "Circus of Becoming".

Film director and sound designer David Lynch sampled "Big Band Beat" as part of his soundscape The Air is On Fire, produced as ambience for a 2007 art exhibition. He reused the song, redubbed "Slow 30s Room", in the eighth episode of television series Twin Peaks' third season, broadcast in June 2017.
