= Jewelled Antler =

American musical collective

Jewelled Antler is an American musical collective created in 1999 by Loren Chasse and Glenn Donaldson as an extension of their work in the organic drone folk-noise group Thuja. The idea was to release handmade CD-R's of various solo and collaborative projects and one-off bands, encompassing drones, songs, electroacoustic sound manipulation, and field recordings. Jewelled Antler is perhaps best known for its "Nature Psych" or "Outdoor Folk", in which whole albums are recorded "in the field" and/or incorporate field recordings and the sounds of nature. Indeed, besides a wide range of traditional and exotic stringed things and low-tech electronic equipment, some of the "instruments" on their albums include pine cones, creeks, branches and crude harps built from fallen trees.

The Jewelled Antler Collective is a term that has been applied to a larger group of musicians working with Chasse and Donaldson or on their own in similar areas: Steven R. Smith, Rob Reger, Donovan Quinn, Christine Boepple, Greg Bianchini, Keith Evans, Eleanor Harwood and Kerry McLaughlin.

Projects such as the Blithe Sons, OF, the Ivytree, The Franciscan Hobbies, Floating Birthday Children, The Buried Civilizations, Tomes, the Famous Boating Party, Hala Strana, The Skygreen Leopards, Glassine, Child Readers, Dead Raven Choir and more have released albums under the Jewelled Antler banner. Many of these groups have moved on to slightly more high-profile releases on labels such as Catsup Plate, Strange Attractors Audio House, FAT CAT, Jagjaguwar, Soft Abuse, Family Vineyard and Music Fellowship.
