= Jackie-O Motherfucker =

American experimental rock group

- Origin: Portland, Oregon, U.S.
- Genres: Experimental rock; post-rock; improvisational; psychedelic folk; drone; space rock; free folk
- Years active: 1994–present
- Labels: Imp; U-Sound Archive; ATP Recordings; Very Friendly; Fire; Ecstatic Peace!
- Members: Tom Greenwood; Honey Owens; Nick Bindeman; Brooke Crouser; Danny Sasaki
- Past members: Jef Brown; John Flaming; Nester Bucket; Jessie Carrot; Josh Stevenson; Theo Angell; Barry Hampton; Adam Forkner; Natalie Mering; Josh Diamond; Samara Lubelski

Jackie-O Motherfucker is an American experimental music group that formed in Portland, Oregon in 1994.

== Biography ==
Jackie-O Motherfucker began as a duo consisting of multi-instrumentalist Tom Greenwood and saxophonist Nester Bucket. The group is a collective with a shifting membership that has included more than forty members drawn from the U.S. experimental scene. As of 2008, the core of the group is focused on founding member Greenwood.

Jackie-O Motherfucker embraces free improvisation, drawing from a variety of subgenres including various folk musics of the world (American folk and blues, Native American song, traditional English folk ballads, etc.), free jazz, field recordings, psychedelia, drone, and noise rock.

The group's first three albums were limited-run vinyl-only releases on now-defunct Portland label Imp Records. Their first widely distributed album, Fig.5, was released in 2000 and was followed by a series of recordings, including the more meandering Liberation and the folk-oriented Flags of the Sacred Harp, which drew from traditional blues and gospel sources.

By this point the group were enjoying a higher profile, including performances at the ATP festival curated by Sonic Youth and Thurston Moore and a cover feature on The Wire.

Since then, the group has had recordings released by a variety of labels before settling down with the London-based label Fire Records from 2008's Blood of Life. The group also operates its own label of CD-R live recordings, the U-Sound Archive, which features live recordings from Jackie-O Motherfucker as well as other like-minded artists such as Double Leopards, Sunroof!, Decaer Pinga, and Vibracathedral Orchestra.

== Members ==
- Tom Greenwood – guitar, turntables, percussion, vocals
- Eva Salens – vocals, keyboards, viola, tapes
- Nick Bindeman – guitar
- Brian Mumford – guitar, electronics
- Jed Bindeman – drums

=== Previous members ===
- Jef Brown – guitar, saxophone
- John Flaming – saxophone
- Nester Bucket – saxophone
- Michael Henrickson – drums
- Jessie Carrot – drums
- Barry Hampton – drums, percussion
- Adam Forkner – guitar
- Natalie Mering – vocals, guitar
- Josh Stevenson – bass, keyboards, guitar
- Theo Angell – vocals, guitars, tapes
- Honey Owens – vocals, guitar, keyboards
- Dana Valatka – drums, electronic percussion, vocals
- Brooke Crouser – guitar
- Samara Lubelski – violin
- Josh Diamond – guitar
- Andy Cvar
- Jack Denning – bass guitar, synthesizers, 808

== Discography ==
- Alchemy... Shit to Gold (1995), Imp Records
- Cross Pollinate (1996), Imp Records
- Flat Fixed (1998), Imp Records
- WOW (1999), Fisheye
- Fig.5 (2000), Road Cone
- The Magick Fire Music (2001), Ecstatic Peace!
- Liberation (2001), Road Cone
- split with Vibracathedral Orchestra (2001), Textile
- Change (2002), Textile
- Europe 2002 live album (2003), Cast Exotic
- From the Earth to the Spheres Vol. 3 with My Cat Is an Alien (2005), Very Friendly
- Flags of the Sacred Harp (2005), ATP Recordings
- The Grave (2006), DotDotDot
- America Mystica (2006), Very Friendly
- Freaker Pipe (2007), U-Sound
- Valley of Fire (2007), Textile Records
- Fig.5 (2007), ATP (reissue of 2000 album)
- The Blood of Life Live Album (2008), Fire Records
- Ballads of the Revolution (2009), Fire Records
- Earth Sound System (2011), Fire Records
- Bloom (2018), Textile Records
- Flags of the Sacred Harp (20th Anniversary Edition) (2025), Fire Records
