= Glenn Donaldson =

American musician

- Born: Glenn David Donaldson; January 28, 1972 (age 54)
- Origin: San Francisco, California, U.S.
- Genres: Indie rock · indie pop · lo-fi · indie folk
- Occupations: Musician; producer; singer; songwriter
- Instruments: Guitar, vocals, keyboards, bass, percussion
- Years active: 1990–present
- Labels: Tough Love, Slumberland
- Website: theredspinksandpurples.bandcamp.com

Glenn David Donaldson (born January 28, 1972) is an American musician most notable for his band The Reds, Pinks and Purples. The band's fourth release, Summer at Land's End, was Bandcamp's album of the day on January 28, 2022.

== Early life ==
Donaldson was raised in Fullerton, California.

== Career ==
Donaldson is also associated with the musical collective Jewelled Antler. He also collaborated with Loren Chasse, Steven R. Smith, and others in such projects as Thuja, The Skygreen Leopards, The Blithe Sons, and Flying Canyon as well as his solo projects. Donaldson is a prolific collage artist and photographer.

== Personal life ==
Donaldson lives in the Richmond District of San Francisco.
