= Fig.5 =

Album by Jackie-O Motherfucker

Studio album by Jackie-O Motherfucker
- Released: 2000
- Genres: Free improvisation, post rock, jazz
- Labels: Road Cone Records (original US release); ATP Recordings (US reissue); Fire Records (UK) (UK release)

Jackie-O Motherfucker chronology
WOW (1999)	Fig.5 (2000)	The Magick Fire Music (2001)

Fig.5 is the fifth studio album by the American experimental rock band Jackie-O Motherfucker. Released originally in the year 2000 on Road Cone, and later reissued by ATP Recordings in 2005. The album is highly improvisational and, features among its track list free-jazz-inspired reworkings of traditional songs such as "Amazing Grace". In addition to the folk sound, the album incorporates elements of drone, post rock and gospel. The album was critically acclaimed, especially on its reissue.

== Background ==
The album is often noted for its interpretation of Americana. "Amazing Grace" is an extremely improvisational take on the Christian hymn of the same name. "Go Down, Old Hannah" is based on a traditional prison work song, also notably covered by blues singer Lead Belly. The songs "Native Einstein" and "Madame Curie" take their names from famous physicists. Founding member of the band Tom Greenwood has mentioned in interviews that the band played together formatively in a rented house on Michigan Ave.

== Reception ==
The album has received high critical acclaim. Upon its initial release, Brent S Sirota of Pitchfork gave the album a 9.2, stating that it "presents a dim and unsettling archaeology of American music" and calling it "the first unapologetically brilliant piece of experimental music I've heard this year." Pitchfork later placed it at number 20 on their "Top 20 albums of 2000 List". Charlie Wilmouth of AllMusic gave the album 4 and a half stars and compared it favourably to the works of Captain Beefheart and The Dirty Three. Upon its reissue Drowned in Sound gave the album a 9 out of 10 with reviewer J.R. Moore calling their version of "Amazing Grace" "the greatest version of that song ever recorded." Mike Pace of Pop Matters offered a much less enthusiastic review, giving the album a 6 out of 10, saying "Fig.5 is pretentious, at times unlistenable, but often strangely intriguing". Tiny Mix Tapes gave the album a 3 out of 5 as the band can "craft instrumental songs that are interesting, but not interesting enough to make an entire album consisting of their weird, sometimes intolerable noodling."

== Track listing ==
No.	Title	Length
1.	"Analogue Skillet"	4:06
2.	"Native Einstein"	6:33
3.	"Your Cells Are In Motion"	9:09
4.	"Go Down, Old Hannah"	6:53
5.	"Amazing Grace"	10:35
6.	"Beautiful September"	10:13
7.	"Chiapas! I Must Go There!"	0:16
8.	"Michigan Avenue Social Club"	24:33
9.	"Madame Curie"	1:29

== Personnel ==
Personnel as listed in the 2005 reissue:

- Tom Greenwood – guitar, harmonica, percussion, alto sax, vocals, banjo
- Jessie Carrot – drums, percussion, bells
- Jef Brown – guitar, oboe, tenor sax, toy piano, clarinet, percussion, upright bass
- John Flemming – alto sax
- Andy Cvar – electronics, lap steel, shells, shaker, organ
- Barry Hampton – upright bass, fender bass, flute, percussion
- Patrick Alveres – percussion, flute
- Nester Bucket – alto sax, tenor sax
- Sha Sha Beautyrest – violin, vocals
- Ryan Noel – tenor sax, lap steel, upright bass, vocals
- Honey Owens – guitar, vocals, snare, percussion
- Brian Foote – electric bass, electronics
- The Amalgamated Everlasting Union Chorus Local #824 – vocals on track 4
