= Christina Kubisch =

German composer (1948 - )

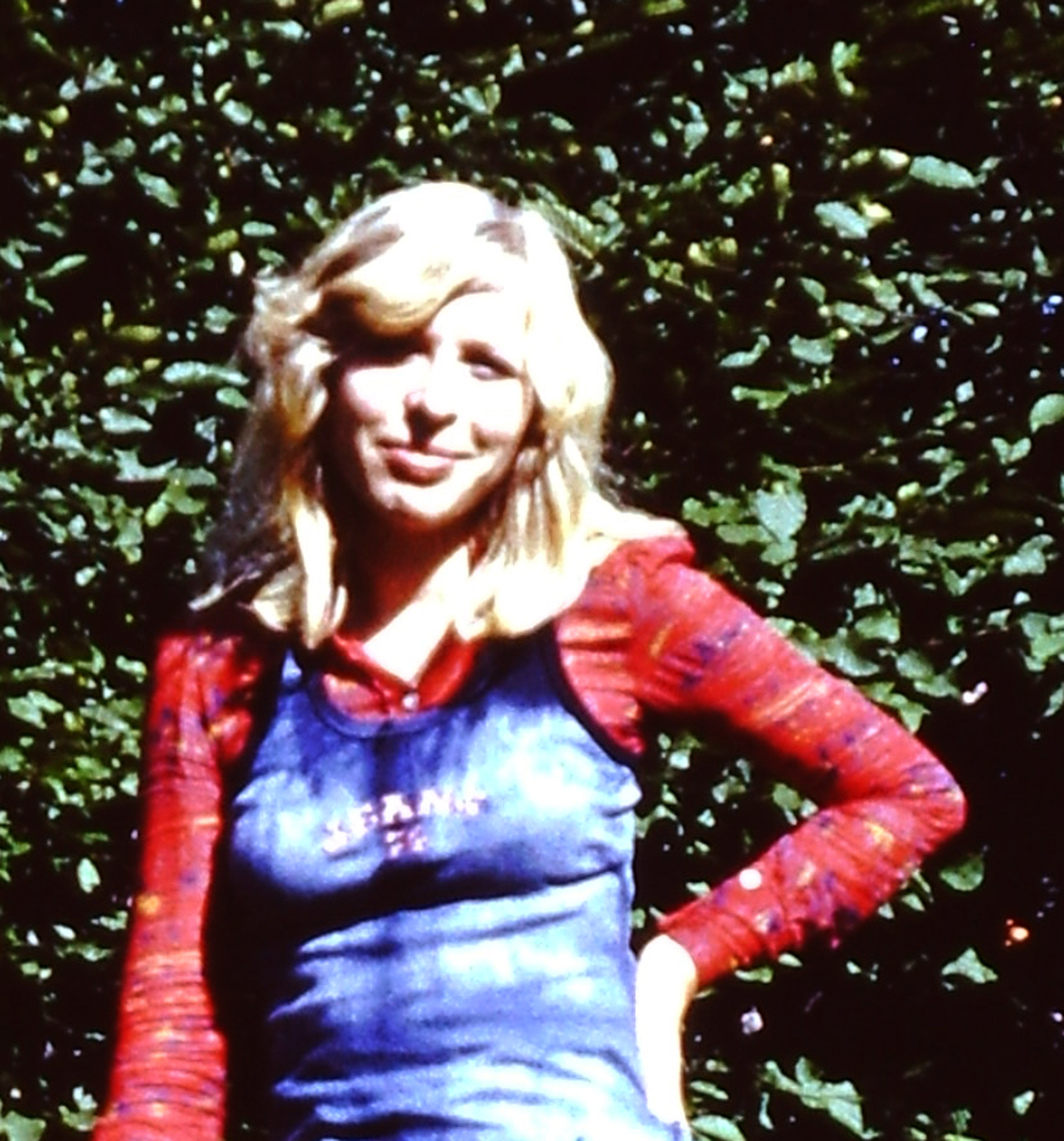
- Christina Kubisch (in Darmstadt, August 1974)
- Born: 31 January 1948 (age 78); Bremen, Germany
- Style: Composer, performance artist, electronic music, tape, professor and flautist
- Website: www.christinakubisch.de electricalwalks.org/about/

Christina Kubisch (born 31 January 1948) is a German composer, sound artist, performance artist, professor and flautist. She composes both electronic and acoustic music for multimedia installations. She gained recognition in the mid-1970s from her early works including concerts, performances and installations. Her work focuses on synthesising audio and visual arts to create multi-sensory experiences for participants. She focuses on finding sounds and music in unusual places that participants would normally not think of as somewhere to experience sound. She is mostly known for her sound installations and "electrical Walks".

== Personal life and education ==
Kubisch was born in Bremen, Germany in 1948. She studied painting at the State Academy of Fine Arts Stuttgart from 1967 to 1968. She studied flute, piano and composition at the Academy of Music in Hamburg, Germany and the Jazz Academy of Graz, Austria from 1969 to 1972. From 1972 to 1974, she continued studying music at the Conservatory of Zurich. In 1974 she moved to Milan, Italy where she began studying composition and electronic music at the Milan Conservatory, graduating with a diploma in 1976.

== Career ==
Kubisch moved to Milan in 1973 and began performing in 1974. She held concerts in Europe and the United States. From 1974 to 1980 she began creating video concerts and installations with Italian artist Fabrizio Plessi. She appeared in the Los Angeles Institute of Contemporary Art (LAICA) show Sound. She created her first sound installations and sound sculptures in 1980 and began working in electroacoustic composition. Her works during this time included Two and Two (1977), a live, multimedia performance and Tempo Liquido (1979), a minimalist piece.

From 1980 to 1981, Kubisch began studying electronics at the Technical Institute of Milan and began working with electromagnetic induction. She began creating sound installations as a way to move out of the concert hall space. Her 1981 work Il Respiro del Mare marked the beginning of her work with electromagnetic induction, in which electronic sounds can be heard with special headphones.

In 1982, Kubisch participated in the Venice Biennale. In 1986 she began working with a new medium, ultraviolet light, including Landscape.

In 1987 she moved to Berlin. During that time, she created the pieces On Air (1984) and Iter Magneticum (1986) and "Night Flight" (1987). In 1989 she became a lecturer at the Jan van Eyck Academy in Maastricht, Germany. From 1990 to 1991, Kubisch began creating her first works with solar energy. She also served as a guest lecturer at the Academy of Fine Arts in Münster and received a working grant from the Senator for Cultural Affairs, Berlin. After 1991 and until 1994 she served as a guest professor at the Academy of Fine Arts in Berlin. In 1992 she was given an international residency project by the Queen Elizabeth II Arts Council of New Zealand. From 1994 to 1995, Kubisch served as a guest professor at the École Nationale Supérieure des Beaux-Arts, Paris.

Kubisch's 1994 installation Sechs Spiegel is one of her better-known pieces, and the sound was recorded and released as a CD. The piece used the architectural proportions of the German building the Ludgwigskirche to determine the rates of repetitions and pauses in vibrating drinking glasses. From 1994 to 2013 Kubisch was professor of sculpture and media art at the Academy of Fine Arts in Saarbrücken.

In 1996, Kubisch created the permanent installation The Clocktower Project at MASS MoCA in North Adams, Massachusetts, a project in which she reactivated a clock tower that had long been out of commission. She created and recorded sounds for the project by ringing, striking, hammering and brushing the bells of the clock with different objects. In 1997, she was made a member of the Academy of Arts, Berlin.

In 2000, Kubisch was the feature of a 20-year retrospective solo exhibition in Russelsheim.

In 2003 she began her Electrical Walks projects, which would become some of her most famous works. The walks are a guided tour through a city, where participants are given special headphones, designed by Kubisch, and directed to parts of the city that have interesting soundscapes. She created personal walks - not open to the public - in Germany, England, France, Ireland, Japan, Latvia, Sweden, Switzerland, Slovakia, Spain, Taiwan, and the United States. She has held public walks in Berlin, Cologne, Karlsruhe, Bremen, Oxford, London and New York. In 2009 and 2010, Kubisch participated in two separate residency programmes, the first in Copenhagen with the DIVA (Danish International Visiting Artists) Exchange Program and the second in Douala, Cameroon at Doual'art.

== Selected exhibitions ==
- 1978: A history of soundcards
- 1995: Prison sentences at Eastern State Penitentiary, Philadelphia
- 1995: Christina Kubisch: Cross Examination (Sound + Light) at Moore College of Art and Design
- 1997 Clocktower Project at Massachusetts Museum of Contemporary Art
- 2000 Sonic Boom: The Art of Sound at Hayward Gallery, London
- 2001 Visual Sound at Mattress Factory, Pittsburgh
- 2005 Her noise at South London Gallery
- 2006 Uncovering Birmingham at Ikon Gallery, Birmingham
- 2006 Invisible Geographies: New Sound Art from Germany at The Kitchen, New York
- 2007 Electrical walks at Huddersfield Festival of Contemporary Music
- 2008 Aleph-Bet sound project at Jewish Museum, San Francisco
- 2019 Voices of memory at Dublin City Public Art Programme
- 2024 Waves, Walks and Wilderness at ZKM Center for Art and Media Karlsruhe

== Selected discography ==
- "Two and Two" LP, with Fabrizio Plessi, Multhipla Records, 1976
- "Tempo Liquido" LP, with Fabrizio Plessi, Cramps Records, 1979
- "Mag Magazin 6" MC, with Fabrizio Plessi, Modern Art Gallery, 1980
- "On Air" MC, Melania Productions, 1984
- "Iter Magneticum" MC, Edition Giannozzo Berlin, 1986
- "Night Flights" LP, ADN, 1987
- "Sechs Spiegel" CD, Edition RZ, 1995
- "Dreaming Of A Major Third (A Composition For The Clocktower Of Mass MoCA)" CD, Edition RZ, 1998
- "Vier Stücke [Four Pieces]" CD, Edition RZ, 2000
- "Le Jardin Magnétique" CD-R, Cité de la Musique, 2001
- "Diapason" CD, Semishigure, 2002
- "Twelve Signals" CD, Semishigure, 2004
- "Armonica" CD, Semishigure, 2005
- "Licht Himmel" CD, Gasometer Oberhausen, 2006
- "E-legend" CD, Ikon Gallery, 2006
- "Five Electrical Walks" CD, Important Records, 2007
- "Minimal Disinformation" Lathe Cut 7", AA Records, 2007
- "La Ville Magnétique / The Magnetic City" CD, Ville De Poitiers, 2008
- "Magnetic Flights" CD, Important Records, 2011
- "Mono Fluido" CD Important Records, 2011
- "Dichte Wolken" CD Edition Museum Ostwall, 2012
- "Mosaïque Mosaic" CD, with Eckehard Güther, Gruenrekorder, 2013
- "Schall und Klang" CD, Fragment Factory, 2019

== Other notable works ==
- Emergency Solos composition for solo flute
- Il Respiro Del Mare, 1981
- Conference of Trees, 1988-1989
- Sechs Spiegel, 1994
- The Clocktower Project
- Dinner Music

== Awards, recognitions and grants ==
Kubisch has received awards and grants, including:

- German Industrial Association award (1988)
- Residency grant, Barkenhoff, Worpswede (1988)
- Kunstfonds e.V., Bonn project grant (1990)
- Studio grant from the Senator (1994)
- Composition grant of the city of Berlin (2000)
- Honorary German Sound Art award (2008)
- Ars Electronica Honorary Mention Digital music (2008)
- Saarländischer Rundfunk Media Art award (2009)
- Beethoven Foundation for Arts and Culture grant (2013)
- Giga-Hertz Award for Electronic Music (2021)

=== Residencies ===
Kubisch has held various residencies, including:

- Banff Centre for the Arts, (Canada)
- Djerassi Resident Artist Program (California, US)
- IASPIS (Stockholm, Sweden)
- DIVA, Danish International Visiting Artists program (Copenhagen)
- Art centre Doual'art (Doualla, Cameroun).

== See also ==
- Pensa, Iolanda (Ed.) 2017. Public Art in Africa. Art et transformations urbaines à Douala /// Art and Urban Transformations in Douala. Genève: Metis Presses. ISBN 978-2-94-0563-16-6
- Noy, Irene (2017). Emergency noises: Sound, art and gender. Bern, Switzerland: Peter Lang. ISBN 9783034319874.
