= The Lickets =

- Origin: Texas
- Genres: Experimental; Folk; Ambient; New Age; Noise; Electronic Music
- Years active: 1999–present
- Label: International Corporation
- Members: Mitch Greer; Rachel Smith

The Lickets are an experimental group described as a "transcendental mini-orchestra" from Texas and currently based in Berkeley. They formed in 1999 as a duo of multi-instrumentalists Mitch Greer and Rachel Smith, and briefly recorded and performed as an electro-acoustic trio in 2009 with double-bassist and vocalist Lena Buell.

They released their first album in 2000 on Sandwich Records and followed that with an album on their own label International Corporation, Fake Universe Man including flutist Jeff Arkenberg, in 2005. In 2006 they released the album Apartment Tree. In 2007 they released the album Journey in Caldecott which also included oboeist Elizabeth Lucas. In 2009 they released two albums: Her Name Came on Arrows and They Turned our Desert into Fire with double-bassist and vocalist Lena Buell and flutist Jeff Arkenberg (Endless Migration). In 2010 they released the albums Song of the Clouds and Eidolons, in 2011 released the album Here (on Earth), and in 2015 released the album Dolls in Color.

== Discography ==
=== Albums ===
- Untitled (2000)
- Fake Universe Man (2005)
- Apartment Tree (2006)
- Journey in Caldecott (2007)
- Her Name Came on Arrows (2009)
- They Turned Our Desert Into Fire (2009)
- Song of the Clouds (2010)
- Eidolons (2010)
- Here (on Earth) (2011)
- Dolls in Color (2015)

== Additional Musicians that Appear on Recordings ==
- G.P. Cole: drums (OED 1 & 2)
- Annika Morgan: synth (OED 1 & 2)
- Julie Carpenter: violin (Five Days Without a Name)
- Scott Marks: trombone (Reconstruction Research, Aquarium), bass (OED 1 & 2)
- Matt Pence: drums (Five Days Without a Name)
- Danielle Stech-Homsy: shruti box (Butterfly Beach)
- Sidera Origer-Steiff: drums (Video)
- Dave Willingham: guitar (OED 1 & 2)
- Hanako Hjersman: violin (Patterned Ground, Birds of Enchantment, Test Particle, St Paul & The Peacocks)
- AnnaMarie Hoos: vocals (Patterned Ground, Birds of Enchantment, Test Particle, St Paul & The Peacocks, Island of Trees and Sorrow)
