= Important Records =

American independent record label

- Founded: 2001
- Founder: John Brien
- Distributors: Forced Exposure, Cargo
- Genre: Contemporary classical, experimental, electronic, rock, folk, jazz
- Country of origin: U.S.
- Location: Groveland, Massachusetts
- Official website: www.importantrecords.com

Important Records is an American independent record label based in Groveland, Massachusetts.

== History ==
John Brien started Important Records in 2001 out of his Newburyport, Massachusetts apartment, initially as an online store. Important's first two releases were Impossible Love by the American songwriter Daniel Johnston and Amlux by the Japanese noise musician Merzbow. In 2003, Important released A Is for Accident, the debut album of The Dresden Dolls.

Important also operates two sublabels: Cassauna, started in 2011, which releases cassettes in letterpress packaging; and Saltern, started in September 2014, curated by Tashi Wada.

== Partial roster of artists ==
- Absolut Null Punkt
- Acid Mothers Temple
- Anoice
- Angels of Light
- Barbez
- Beequeen
- Maurizio Bianchi
- James Blackshaw
- Boris
- Caterina Barbieri
- Tom Carter
- Cave
- Citay
- Diane Cluck
- Cluster
- Coil
- Kimya Dawson
- Deceh
- The Dresden Dolls
- Eleh
- Else Marie Pade
- Carlos Giffoni
- Grails
- Hafler Trio
- Keiji Haino
- Holy Sons
- Hototogisu
- Henry Jacobs
- Jim Jarmusch
- Daniel Johnston
- KK Null
- Kawabata Makoto
- Julia Kent
- King Missile III
- Kluster
- Kenneth James Gibson
- Christina Kubisch
- Larsen
- Francisco López
- LSD March
- Major Stars
- Master Musicians of Bukkake
- Kouhei Matsunaga
- Daniel Menche
- Merzbow
- Mountainhood
- Mouthus
- Mugstar
- My Cat Is an Alien
- Nadja
- Ocean
- Pauline Oliveros
- Piano Magic
- Duane Pitre
- A Place to Bury Strangers
- Éliane Radigue
- Lee Ranaldo
- Rivulets
- Conrad Schnitzler
- The Skull Defekts
- Smegma
- Unbunny
- Vampillia
- The Vanishing Voice
- Jozef van Wissem
- Xiu Xiu
- C. Spencer Yeh

== See also ==
- Important Records discography
