= My Cat Is an Alien =

Italian musical duo

My Cat Is An Alien
- Origin: Turin, Italy
- Genres: experimental, avant garde, audiovisual performance
- Years active: 1997–present
- Labels: Atavistic, Elliptical Noise, Important, Opax Records
- Members: Maurizio Opalio; Roberto Opalio
- Website: mycatisanalien.com

My Cat Is An Alien (MCIAA) is an Italian musical duo consisting of brothers Maurizio and Roberto Opalio, formed in Turin, Italy, in late 1997. The band releases avant garde or experimental music in a form of improvisation that MCIAA themselves call 'instantaneous composition'.

== Career ==
=== Formation and early releases (1997–2006) ===
Before forming MCIAA, Roberto Opalio worked in painting, glass art and photography. The duo's wider artistic practice also encompasses drawing, film, video and installation art. Roberto's paintings, drawings and photographs have been used as cover artwork for MCIAA releases, with the duo also credited for album design and layout.

In their early years, MCIAA recorded at the 'Space Room', a studio in Turin, Italy. They self-released many limited CD-Rs during that period. In April 2002, Thurston Moore's Ecstatic Peace! label reissued the duo's 1999 recording Landscapes Of An Electric City as a three-sided vinyl LP with the EP Hypnotic Spaces. The duo's album Il Segno (2003) also received praise from Tom Roberts of Dusted.

Between 2003 and 2006, MCIAA released three vinyl albums through Eclipse Records: The Rest Is Silence (2003), When The Windmill's Whirl Dies (2004), and Greetings From The Great Void (2006). The duo later referred to these releases as The Great Void Trilogy. In 2005, MCIAA released The Cosmological Eye Trilogy, a three-CD album on Last Visible Dog Records combining previously released recordings with new material. The album received a favorable review from Terrascope in February 2006.

Also in 2005, the Opalio brothers moved their recording studio from Turin to the Western Alps, establishing a new space they called 'Alien Zone', where Roberto began using wordless vocalizations as a musical instrument. That same year, Roberto was also commissioned to design an exclusive T-shirt for The Wire magazine. Following Through the Reflex of the Rain (2005), MCIAA released Cosmic Light Of The Third Millennium and Leave Me In The Black No-Thing through Important Records in 2006.

In 2007, the label issued Roberto Opalio's solo debut album Chants From Isolated Ghosts on CD, following its original limited release through Opax Records.

In 2008, Important Records released a split vinyl LP featuring separate recordings by Maurizio and Roberto Opalio. The label also released For The Tears Of The Land, Prayers From The Outer Space, a split double album featuring MCIAA and their side project Praxinoscope. The Japanese magazine Studio Voice also included MCIAA's album Different Shades of Blue in its retrospective 2008 The Best of Ambient Works 1978–2008, selecting it for the year 2005. The duo was also featured in the 2009 book Ambient Music 1969–2009.

In 2006, My Cat Is An Alien performed at Belgium's K-RAA-K Festival and Canada's Festival International de Musique Actuelle de Victoriaville. They also appeared at ATP Nightmare Before Christmas, curated by Thurston Moore, in England that December, followed by Ferrara Sotto Le Stelle in Italy in July 2007.

=== Later releases and recognition (2008–2011) ===
In 2008, My Cat Is An Alien signed to Atavistic Worldwide.

In 2008, Roberto Opalio and My Cat Is An Alien were invited by Sonic Youth to take part in the Sonic Youth etc.: Sensational Fix exhibition, scheduled in major European museums of contemporary arts between 2008 and 2010. Other than the official exhibition catalog published by Walter Koenig, curator Roland Groenenboom presented a spin-off limited zine at Malmo Konsthall, featuring exclusive artworks by Roberto Opalio and MCIAA, alongside Christian Marclay, Savage Pencil, Barbara Ess and Marco Fusinato.

Roberto Opalio contributed to this exhibition with Alien Guitar Case No. 6, one in his series of installations made of the artist's multimedia artworks and objects incorporated into MCIAA's used guitar cases; and his film entitled Alien Blood (2005–2008), whose soundtrack by MCIAA was sold in a very limited vinyl art edition on Opax Records, and later included in ALIENOLOGY: Selected Works 1998-2008 (2011).

In 2009, Atavistic released Roberto Opalio's 2008 dual film Light_Earth_Blue_Silver on DVD. The soundtrack is by My Cat Is An Alien. The film was presented at Netwerk Center for Contemporary Art in Aalst (Belgium) in March 2009, at Octubre CCC (Centre de Cultura Contemporània) in Valencia (Spain) in April 2009 and at Netmage.10 International Live-Media Festival at Palazzo Re Enzo, Bologna (Italy) in January 2010. Ken Hollings writes about it in his cover article (The Wire, No. 331):

Light_Earth_Blue_Silver communicates this sense of immediacy with great concentration and power. Its sole protagonist is a large wire model of the Alien icon Roberto has been featuring in paintings and drawings over many years. A stick figure with widely extended arms and legs, its head is a single sharply elliptical eye, permanently open and staring out at the universe that surrounds it. In a series of raw ritual gestures, the Alien is dragged and pushed through a rough winter landscape: shown across two screens, the twitching of the wire limbs makes it appear as if the Alien were writhing and crawling over the snow-covered rocks and brown, bare earth. To MCIAA's intense soundtrack, the Alien becomes entangled with branches, twigs and lichen until at the movie's climax, he is seen moving upright against a blue Alpine sky.

In 2009, Elliptical Noise Records began releasing the Opalio brothers' albums. In September 2011, My Cat Is An Alien was the cover feature in The Wire magazine. On September 14, the duo released the compilation box set ALIENOLOGY: Selected Works 1998-2008, a ten-disc retrospective.

== Collaborations ==
My Cat Is An Alien have collaborated with Sonic Youth, Thurston Moore, Lee Ranaldo, Christian Marclay, Keiji Haino, Jim O'Rourke, Loren Mazzacane Connors, Jackie-O Motherfucker, Nels Cline (Wilco), Text of Light, Steve Roden, Christina Carter (Charalambides), Mats Gustafsson, Enore Zaffiri and other artists.

In July 2004 MCIAA started a collaborative project with some of these artists in the form of two series of special split Art-LP releases (later re-issued on CD) entitled From the earth to the Spheres (7 volumes) and Cosmic Debris (5 volumes). Both boxsets came with a 30x30 cm acrylic painting on canvas or wood panels, in the latter series with the addition of installed Polaroid films. Each copy was individually signed and numbered. From the earth to the Spheres series has been awarded 2004's “Avant Rock Top 10" by The Wire, with Edwin Pouncey writing:

Italian DIY space rockers My Cat Is An Alien’s rampant release schedule continues to attract Sun Ra worshippers to their cause. The production takes on the mantle of a release from Saturn. ... The creative concept behind the Opalio brothers' ongoing From the earth to the Spheres series of dual recordings featuring guest artists is somewhat reminiscent of the ESP-Disk mantra.

At the beginning of 2008 My Cat Is An Alien were introduced to Italian pioneer of electronic music Enore Zaffiri. In February, the trio recorded some completely improvised material, with Zaffiri re-working some of his reel-to-reel tapes from the 1960s. In 2009, the sessions were released by Atavistic on the CD/DVD boxset Through The Magnifying Glass Of Tomorrow (2009), also featuring two art films: Trasparenze (by Zaffiri) and Light_Earth_Blue_Silver (by Roberto Opalio, with soundtrack by MCIAA).

In 2008, My Cat Is an Alien were invited by Sonic Youth to take part in the Sonic Youth etc.: Sensational Fix exhibition. At the opening at LiFE museum in St-Nazaire, France, My Cat is an Alien joined Lee Ranaldo (Sonic Youth) for a special live music performance collaboration, along with Michael Morley (Dead C), and Opalio's close collaborator Ramona Ponzini (Painting Petals On Planet Ghost). The performance was later released by Starlight Furniture Co. as Live @ Sensational Fix, 2009. Later that year, another collaborative live event with Lee Ranaldo occurred in Verona, Italy, this time close to the second opening of the same exhibition at Museion in Bolzano. In 2010, Atavistic released the performance on CD as All Is Lost In Translation.

== Musical style and instrumentation ==
As multi-instrumentalists, My Cat Is An Alien primarily play electric and acoustic guitars, various toy instruments (so-called 'space toys'), modified electronics ('alientronics') and a wide set of percussion. Roberto Opalio's use of wordless vocalizations is also present on many tracks.

In this regard, English writer Ken Hollings wrote:

Less a celestially pure tone than a cosmic moan, his brother's [Roberto] vocals find a distant echo in Blind Willie Johnson's Dark Was The Night Cold Was The Ground, recorded on Earth back in 1927 but currently making its way through deep space aboard Voyager as part of its collection of human music.

== Discography ==
Albums

- s/t CD-r (Opax Records, 1998)
- Landscapes Of An Electric City CD-r (Opax Records/ ZZZ Prod., 1999)
- The Alien cd-r Attack Series! Vol. I - Alien Holland Invasion - CD-r (Opax Records, 2000)
- The Alien cd-r Attack Series! Vol. II - Infinite lights above us - CD-r (Opax Records, 2001)
- The Alien cd-r Attack Series! Vol. III - “...Ascends The Sky" - CD-r (Opax Records, 2001)
- Landscapes Of An Electric City/ Hypnotic Spaces 3-sided LP (Ecstatic Peace!, 2002)
- Out Of The Blue___Into The White 3CD-r set (Opax Records, 2003)
- Il Segno LP / CD (Starlight Furniture Co., 2003/ 2007)
- The Rest Is Silence 2LP (Eclipse Records, 2004)
- The First Flame Of Tomorrow CD-r (Opax Records, 2004)
- Floating In The Void CD-r (Opax Records, 2004)
- Through The Reflex Of The Rain CD (Free Porcupine Society, 2005)
- When The Windmill's Whirl Dies LP (Eclipse Records, 2005)
- Different Shades Of Blue CD-r / LP (U-Sound Archive, 2005 / A Silent Place, 2006)
- Black Shadows From Jupiter LP (Opax Records, 2005)
- Alien Minds C60 cassette (Sloow Tapes, 2005)
- Plutonian Flames 2CD-r (Opax Records, 2005)
- The Cosmological Eye Trilogy 3CD (Last Visible Dog, 2005)
- Astral Key CD-r (Esquilo, 2005)
- Folclore Alieno CD-r (Opax Records, 2006)
- There's A Flame___Sometimes LP (Rococo Records, 2006 / Opax Records, 2008)
- Listen Before Black Falls LP (Root Strata, 2006)
- Cosmic Light Of The Third Millennium CD (Important Records, 2006)
- The Secret Of The Dancing Snow CD (Ikuisuus, 2006)
- "...Ascends The Sky" CD (Rebis/Whitened Sepulchre, 2006)
- Greetings From The Great Void 2LP (Eclipse Records, 2006)
- Il Suono Venuto Dallo Spazio CD (Les Disques VICTO, 2006)
- On Air At Sound Projecting CD-r / LP (Opax Records, 2005 / 2006)
- Leave Me In The Black No-Thing CD (Important Records, 2007)
- Into The White Vortex 1-sided ART-LP (Opax Records, 2007)
- "Speak, alien, SPEAK!" 3 C20 cassette set (Opax Records, 2007)
- Sotto Le Stelle etched ART-LP (Lost Treasures of the Underworld, 2008)
- Alien Blood LP (Opax Records, 2008)
- For the tears of the Land_Prayers from the outer space (split with Praxinoscope) 2LP / 2CD (Important Records, 2009 / Elliptical Noise, 2009)
- Through The Magnifying Glass Of Tomorrow (with Enore Zaffiri) CD+DVD (Atavistic, 2009)
- Mort Aux Vaches CD (Staalplaat, Mort Aux Vaches series, 2009)
- Live @ Sensational Fix (with Michael Morley, Ramona Ponzini, Lee Ranaldo) LP (Starlight Furniture Co., 2009)
- Black Shadows from Jupiter, Vol. I & II 2CD (Elliptical Noise, 2010)
- Photoelectric Season 2CD (Elliptical Noise, 2010)
- My Cat Is An Alien & Bjerga/Iversen LP (Ikuisuus / Gold Soundz, 2010)
- Fragments Suspended In Time LP + CD + DVD (Opax Records, 2010)
- All Is Lost In Translation (with Ramona Ponzini, Lee Ranaldo) CD (Atavistic, 2010)
- Gramofonu = voice of the Universe (with BBNU) LP (Opax Records / Love Nest, 2011)
- What Space Is Made For 3CD Box (Elliptical Noise, 2011)
- Alienology: Selected Works 1998-2008 10CD Box (Elliptical Noise, 2011)
- Living On The Invisible Line LP (Divorce, 2011)

Collaborative albums

- Thurston Moore / My Cat Is An Alien - 'From the earth to the Spheres, vol.1' split ART-LP / CD (Opax Records, 2004 / Very Friendly/ CARGO UK, 2004)
- Thuja / My Cat Is An Alien - 'From the earth to the Spheres, vol.2' split ART-LP / CD (Opax Records, 2004 / Very Friendly/ CARGO UK, 2004)
- Jackie-O Motherfucker / My Cat Is An Alien - 'From the earth to the Spheres, vol.3' split ART-LP / CD (Opax Records, 2004 / Very Friendly/ CARGO UK, 2005)
- Jim O'Rourke / My Cat Is An Alien - 'From the earth to the Spheres, vol.4' split ART-LP (Opax Records, 2005)
- Christina Carter & Andrew MacGregor / My Cat Is An Alien - 'From the earth to the Spheres, vol.5' split ART-LP / CD (Opax Records, 2005 / Very Friendly/ CARGO UK, 2005)
- Glands Of External Secretion with Nels Cline / My Cat Is An Alien - 'From the earth to the Spheres, vol.6' split ART-LP / CD (Opax Records, 2005 / Very Friendly/ CARGO UK, 2006)
- Christian Marclay & Okkyung Lee / My Cat Is An Alien - 'From the earth to the Spheres, vol.7' split ART-LP / CD (Opax Records, 2006 / A Silent Place, 2006)
- Tony Herrington / My Cat Is An Alien - 'Joint Multiples 04' Box/CD-R/Painting/Polaroid/Painted Photograph (no label, 2006)
- My Cat Is An Alien / Fabio Orsi - 'For Alan Lomax' split CD (A Silent Place, 2006)
- Text Of Light / My Cat Is An Alien - 'Cosmic Debris, Vol.I' split ART-LP / CD (Opax Records, 2006 / A Silent Place, 2007)
- Steve Roden / My Cat Is An Alien - 'Cosmic Debris, Vol.II' split ART-LP / CD (Opax Records, 2007 / A Silent Place, 2007)
- Keiji Haino / My Cat Is An Alien - 'Cosmic Debris, Vol.III' split ART-LP / CD (Opax Records, 2007 / A Silent Place, 2007)
- Mats Gustafsson / My Cat Is An Alien - 'Cosmic Debris, Vol.IV' split ART-LP / CD (Opax Records, 2008 / A Silent Place, 2009)
- Loren Connors & Haunted House / My Cat Is An Alien - 'Cosmic Debris, Vol.V' split ART-LP (Opax Records, 2008)
- Family Underground / My Cat Is An Alien split LP (Reverse, 2007)
- Praxinoscope / My Cat Is An Alien - 'For the tears of the Land_Prayers from the outer space' split 2LP / 2CD (Important Records, 2009 / Elliptical Noise, 2009)
- Pestrepeller / My Cat Is An Alien split Picture Disc LP (A Silent Place, 2009)
- My Cat Is An Alien & Enore Zaffiri - 'Through The Magnifying Glass Of Tomorrow' CD+DVD (Atavistic, 2009)
- Michael Morley, My Cat Is An Alien, Ramona Ponzini, Lee Ranaldo - 'Live @ Sensational Fix' LP (Starlight Furniture Co., 2009)
- My Cat Is An Alien & Bjerga/Iversen LP (Ikuisuus / Gold Soundz, 2010)
- My Cat Is An Alien, Ramona Ponzini, Lee Ranaldo - 'All Is Lost In Translation' CD (Atavistic, 2010)
- BBNU & MCIAA - 'Gramofonu = voice of the Universe' LP (Opax Records / Love Nest, 2011)

Singles and EPs

- Hypnotic Spaces ep CD-r (Opax Records, 1998)
- Alien Dissolving ep CD-r (Opax Records/ ZZZ Prod., 1999)
- Everything Is Here lathe-cut 7 inch (Gold Soundz, 2005)
- Introducing The Cosmic Blues 7 inch (Important Records, 2006)
- My Cat Is An Alien / Corsican Paintbrush split 10 inch lathe cut (Opax Records/ Foxglove, 2006)
- Different Shades of Tape Box C60 cassette + 7 inch + T-shirt (A Silent Place, 2007)
- My Cat Is An Alien / Valerio Cosi - 'Stories From The Vacuum' split 7 inch (Black Horizon, 2008)
- 8 inch Triangular Lathe Cut Record (Pseudoarcana, 2008)
- My Cat Is An Alien / Moonmilk - 'Paseridae I' split 7 inch (Sound&Fury, 2009)
