= Absolut Null Punkt =

Japanese rock band

Absolut Null Punkt (often abbreviated to ANP) is a Japanese rock band formed by KK Null and Seijiro Murayama in 1984. ANP's music incorporates elements of free jazz, heavy rock, industrial music, and glitch music. Although the group disbanded in 1987, they reformed in 2003 for a series of live performances. Recordings of these performances make up the Live in Japan album, released on the Important Records label. This was followed by Metacompound, the group's first studio recording in 19 years, also released on the Important Records label.

Absolut Null Punkt (Absolutt Nullpunkt) is Norwegian for "Total zero point".
