= Loren Chasse =

- Genres: Psychedelic folk, experimental music
- Occupation(s): Musician, sound artist, educator

Loren Chasse is an American musician, sound artist, field recordist and teacher, most notable for his association with Jewelled Antler and his work with Thuja, The Blithe Sons, The Child Readers, Of and many others. He has been called "one of the most important international artists working in the areas of environment and sound." With Glenn Donaldson, he operates the Jewelled Antler record label, releasing works by themselves and others. In addition to his musical performances, Chasse has also performed at the Auckland International Film Festival, giving a "live cinema" light and sound performance using objects such as motors, clocks, strobe lights, branches, gravel, sand and leaves.

Chasse worked also an educator in the San Francisco public school system, developing curriculum for children intended to enhance their perception of their sound environment. He credits this work with "helping him recognize the importance of listening in the moment." Currently Mr. Chasse works at Duniway Elementary School in Portland Oregon as an upper elementary teacher.
