= ¡Ciaütistico! =

Studio album by XXL
- Released: September 20, 2005
- Recorded: May 2005
- Genre: Post-rock, experimental rock
- Length: 40:29
- Label: Important Records

XXL chronology
¡Ciaütistico! (2005)	¿Spicchiology? (2007)

Professional ratings
Review scores
Source	Rating
Pitchfork Media	(7/10)

¡Ciaütistico! is the debut album from XXL, the collaborative effort of Italian experimental rock band Larsen and American band Xiu Xiu. It was recorded at Larsen's studio in Turin, Italy. Though largely instrumental, the album features vocals from Caralee McElroy on "Paw Paw Paw Paw Paw Paw Paw" and "Minne Mouseistic" and Jamie Stewart on "(Pokey I'm Your) Gnocchi" and "Prince Charming", a cover of the 1981 single by Adam and the Ants.

== Track listing ==
All lyrics are written by Jamie Stewart, except where noted; all music is composed by Xiu Xiu Larsen, except where noted.

No.	Title	Lyrics	Music	Length
1.	"Paw Paw Paw Paw Paw Paw Paw"			4:29
2.	"Minne Mouseistic"	Marco Schiavo		6:39
3.	"Ciao Ciautistico"			1:51
4.	"(Pokey I'm Your) Gnocchi"			5:19
5.	"Distorted Duck"			4:47
6.	"Lipstick Fair"			1:14
7.	"Prince Charming"	Stuart Goddard, Marco Pirroni	Goddard, Pirroni, arr. Xiu Xiu Larsen	4:23
8.	"Birthday Song"			4:40
9.	"Sunday"			7:06
