= Steven R. Smith =

American musician

- Genres: Indie rock, psychedelic rock Experimental music
- Occupations: Musician; composer; producer
- Instruments: Guitar, bass, keyboards, drums
- Years active: 1995–present
- Labels: Soft Abuse, Worstward Recordings
- Website: worstward.com

Steven R. Smith is an American musician, instrument-builder, and printmaker often associated with the Jewelled Antler collective. Born in Fullerton, California and based in San Francisco and, more recently, Los Angeles, he has been musically active since the mid-1990s. His main instrument is guitar, both acoustic and electric, although other instruments, including the hurdy-gurdy, bouzouki, fretted spike fiddles, and assorted ethnic instruments, have been incorporated into his work.

Smith's music has drawn elements from psychedelic rock, traditional folk music, soundtracks, free jazz, and modern composers. Throughout his career Smith has recorded for a number of independent labels such as Important Records, Soft Abuse, Catsup Plate, Root Strata, Immune Recordings, Last Visible Dog, Jewelled Antler, Darla Records, and Emperor Jones.

In addition to his ongoing solo work, Smith has been a member of the instrumental psych-rock group Mirza; the improvisational group Thuja; Hala Strana, a project which focuses on the traditional music of Eastern Europe; and most recently Ulaan Passerine, Ulaan Markhor, and Ulaan Khol.

== Discography ==
Steven R. Smith

- Log the Man Dead – CS (Autopia, 1995)
- Gehenna Belvedere – LP (Autopia, 1996)
- Autumn Is the End – CD (Darla, 1998)
- From Ashes Come – CD (3 Acre Floor, 1999)
- Slate Branches – CD (3 Acre Floor, 2000), LP (Little Brother Records, 2000)
- Death of Last Year's Man e.p. – 7” (autopia, 2000), CDEP (Emperor Jones, 2001)
- Tableland – CD (Emperor Jones, 2001)
- Lineaments – CD (Emperor Jones, 2002)
- Kohl – CDr (Jewelled Antler, 2002), LP (Emperor Jones, 2005)
- Antimony – CDr (Digitalis Industries, 2004)
- Crown of Marches – CD (Catsup Plate, 2005)
- The Anchorite - LP (Important Records, 2006), CD (Root Strata, 2008)
- Owl - CD (Digitalis Industries, 2007)
- Cities - LP (Immune Recordings, 2009)
- Floor of the Sky e.p. - LP (Burnt Toast Vinyl, 2011)
- Old Skete - LP (Worstward Recordings, 2011)
- Ending/Returning - 2xLP (Immune Recordings, 2013)
- A Sketchbook of Endings - LP/CD (Soft Abuse, 2019)
- The Loss of What We Keep e.p. - DL (Worstward Recordings, 2019)
- In the Spires - LP (Cold Moon Records, 2021)
- The Growing Surface e.p. - DL (Worstward Recordings, 2021)
- Spring - LP (Soft Abuse, 2022)
- Arroyo Tree Complex - CS (Worstward Recordings, 2023)
- Olive - LP (Soft Abuse, 2024)
- Triecade - LP (Worstward Recordings, 2025)
- Anacapa - DL (Worstward Recordings, 2025)
- Turning e.p. - DL (Worstward Recordings, 2025)
- Half-Light Unfolding - LP (Eiderdown Records, 2026)

Hala Strana

- Karst e.p. – 3”CDr (Jewelled Antler, 2003)
- Hala Strana – CD (Emperor Jones, 2003), LP (Desastre, 2017)
- Fielding – 2xCDr (Jewelled Antler, 2003), 2xCD (Last Visible dog, 2004), 2xLP (Worstward/Desastre 2020)
- These Villages – CD (Soft Abuse, 2004)
- White Sleep - lathe cut 7" (Soft Abuse, 2006)
- Heave the Gambrel Roof - LP/CD (Music Fellowship, 2007)
- Compendium - DL (Worstward Recordings, 2011)
- Hala Strana boxset - 5xCS box set (Cabin Floor Esoterica, 2014)

Ulaan Janthina

- Ulaan Janthina (part I) - CS (Worstward Recordings, 2020)
- Ulaan Janthina (part II) - CS (Worstward Recordings, 2020)
- The Sea Surrounding - DL (Worstward Recordings, 2024)

Ulaan Passerine

- Ulaan Passerine - 2xCS (Brave Mysteries, 2013); cd (Worstward Recordings, 2014)
- Byzantium Crow - CD (Worstward Recordings, 2014)
- Light in Dust e.p. - 10" (Worstward Recordings, 2015)
- The Great Unwinding - 2xCS (Worstward Recordings, 2016)
- Moss Cathedral - CS (Worstward Recordings, 2016)
- The Landscape of Memory - LP (Worstward Recordings, 2017)
- New Evening - LP (Worstward Recordings, 2019)
- Crow/Olive - 7" (Samaritan Press, 2020)
- Fragments - DL (Worstward Recordings, 2020
- Sun Spar - LP (Worstward Recordings, 2022)
- Dawn - LP (Worstward Recordings, 2023)

Ulaan Markhor

- Ulaan Markhor - CD/LP (Soft Abuse, 2012)
- Spiral Horns, Black Onions, et al. - LP (Soft Abuse, 2014)
- Detritus: 2010-2016 - DL (Worstward Recordings, 2016)
- Helm - CS (Soft Abuse, 2018)

Ulaan Khol

- I – CD (Soft Abuse, 2008)
- II – CD (Soft Abuse, 2008)
- III – CD (Soft Abuse, 2010)
- La Catacomb - CS (Soft Abuse, 2011)
- Los Angeles e.p. - DL (Worstward Recordings, 2012)
- Ending/Returning - 2xLP (Immune Recordings, 2013)
- Salt - CS (Soft Abuse, 2015)
- Collapsing Hymns - CS (Worstward Recordings, 2019)
- Milk Thistle - CS (Desastre, 2023)

Thuja

- The Deer Lay Down Their Bones – CD (Tumult, 2000)
- Ghost Plants – CD (Emperor Jones, 2002)
- Museum #1 – 3”CDr (Jewelled Antler, 2002)
- Museum #2 – 3”CDr (Jewelled Antler, 2002)
- Hills – CDr (Last Visible Dog, 2002), LP (Rose Hobart, 2019)
- Suns – CD (Emperor Jones, 2002)
- All Strange Beasts of the Past – CD (Emperor Jones, 2003)
- Fable – 3”CD (Jewelled Antler, 2003)
- Pine Cone Temples – 2xCD (Strange Attractors, 2005)
- Thuja – LP (Important, 2008)

Mirza

- Mirza – 12”EP (Autopia, 1996)
- Anadromous – CD (Darla, 1997)
- Iron Compass Flux – 2xLP/CD (Darla, 1998)
- Last Clouds – CD (Ba Da Bing!, 2001)

43 Odes

- 43 Odes - CS (Eiderdown Recordings, 2019)
- HWN UN AMN - LP (Eiderdown Recordings, 2023)
