= Eleh =

American electronic/drone musician

Eleh is an American electronic/drone musician who began working in 1999 and whose first release was in 2006. He was reticent about providing any public information on his identity. Eleh has released music on Touch, Important Records and Taiga Records. In April 2020, Important Records owner John Brien acknowledged that Eleh is his project on the Art + Music + Technology podcast.

== Performances ==
In September 2012 he performed at Our Lady of Lebanon Cathedral in Brooklyn Heights, Brooklyn, New York. This show was Eleh's fifth ever and first in the United States. The show was part of the Touch.30 Festival, presented by Issue Project Room. The festival showcased musicians connected with the English multimedia entity Touch, which has been producing recordings, performances, films and publications since the 1980s.
