= Citay =

American band

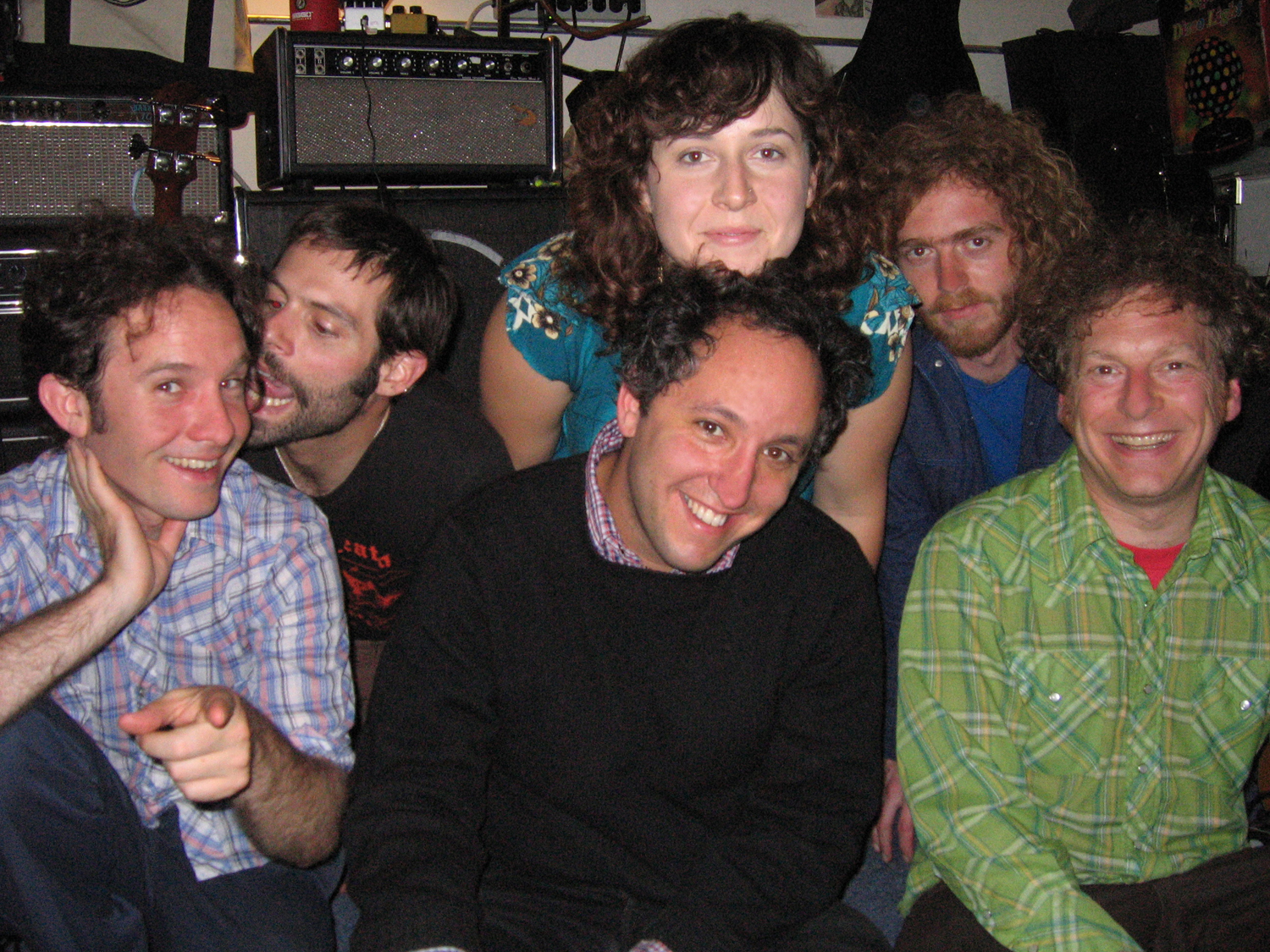
- Some members of the band.

Background information
- Origin: San Francisco, Los Angeles, California
- Genres: psychedelic pop-rock
- Years active: 2004-present
- Labels: Dead Oceans
- Members: Ezra Feinberg, Marc Dantona, Warren Huegel, Josh Pollock, Meryl Press and Sean Smith
- Past members: Adria Otte, Jesse Reiner, Julie Napolin, Diego Gonzalez, Tahlia Harbour, April Hayley, Shayde Sartin, Lorraine Rath, Bert Bergen, and Tim Green

Citay is an American, San Francisco-based band currently released on Dead Oceans. The band was formed in 2004 by Ezra Feinberg as a studio project with Tim Green from The Fucking Champs, and some help from others. There is now a live band including members of Tussle, The Dry Spells, Sean Smith, 3 Leafs, and Daevid Allen's University of Errors. Citay performed at the South by Southwest Music Festival in 2007 and 2008.

== Instrumentation ==
The band uses acoustic and electric guitars, electric bass, keyboards, drums, and other percussions. The band's sound includes guitar harmonies, long instrumental sections, and Beach Boys-like vocals. The sound has been described as psychedelic pop-rock.

== Discography ==
- Citay, 2006, Important Records (CD), Frenetic Records (LP)
- Little Kingdom, 2007, Dead Oceans (CD), Important Records (LP)
- Remixes, 2009, Dead Oceans
- Dream Get Together (2010)
