= A (disambiguation) =

A is the first letter of the Latin and English alphabet.

A may also refer to:

== Science and technology ==
=== Astronomy ===
- A whitish-blue class of stars in the Morgan–Keenan system; see Stellar classification
- Part of the provisional designation of a comet (e.g., C/1760 A1), indicating a January 1 through 15 discovery
- The semi-major axis of an orbit

=== Biology ===
- A, an antigen and a corresponding blood type in the ABO blood group system in primates such as humans
- Vitamin A, also called retinol, an essential human nutrient
- Haplogroup A (mtDNA), a human mitochondrial DNA (mtDNA) haplogroup
- Haplogroup A (Y-DNA), a Y-chromosomal DNA (Y-DNA) haplogroup
- Adenine, a nucleic acid
- Adenosine, a nucleoside
- Alanine, an amino acid
- ATC code A, Alimentary tract and metabolism, a section of the Anatomical Therapeutic Chemical Classification System

=== Chemistry ===
- Chemical element argon (historical symbol "A", currently "Ar")
- A value, a measure of substituent effects on the stereochemistry of cyclohexane
- Activity (chemistry) (a)
- Chemical affinity (A)
- Mass number of a nuclide (A)
- Relative atomic mass (A_{r})

=== Crystallography ===
- The center of a hexagonal face of the Brillouin zone of a hexagonal lattice, in physics
- One of the reciprocal lattice vectors (a*)
- Unit cell length (a)

=== Computing ===
==== Programming languages ====
- A+ (programming language)
- A^{♯}, an object-oriented functional programming language
- A Sharp (.NET) (also written "A#"), a port of Ada to the Microsoft .NET Platform
- BASIC A+

==== Other uses in computing ====
- A* search algorithm, a pathfinding algorithm
- A-0 System, an early computer compiler
- <a></a>, the HTML element for an anchor tag
- a, equivalent (qname) to the RDF Schema Property rdf:type
- A level of web accessibility defined by the Web Content Accessibility Guidelines
- The address record type of DNS, defined in RFC 1035

=== Electricity and magnetism ===
- A battery, a vacuum tube filament type battery
- A battery (size), a standard battery size
- Anode, an electrode
- Absorbance (A)
- Ampere (A), unit of electric current
- Bohr radius (a_{0})
- Gain (electronics) (A)
- Hall coefficient (A_{H})
- Magnetic vector potential (A)
- Hyperfine coupling constant (a or A)

=== Mathematics and logic ===
- A numerical digit meaning ten in hexadecimal and other positional numeral systems with a radix of 11 or greater
- Sometimes in blackboard bold represents the algebraic numbers ($\mathbb{A}$) (U+1D538 in Unicode)
- Universal quantifier in symbolic logic (symbol ∀ or $\forall$, an inverted letter A)
- Universal affirmative, one of the four types of categorical proposition in logic
- Mills' constant is represented by the symbol A
- Glaisher–Kinkelin constant is also often represented by the symbol A

=== Thermodynamics ===
- a, a measure for the attraction between particles in the Van der Waals equation
- Hamaker constant (A)
- Helmholtz free energy (A)
- Pre-exponential factor (A)
- Richardson's constant (A)
- Thermal diffusivity (a)

=== Other uses in science and technology ===
- Acceleration (a)
- Adsorption (a)
- Annum (a), for year
- Are (a), a unit of area (equal to 100 square metres; redirects to hectare)
- Atto- (a-), the SI prefix meaning 10^{−18}
- Ångström (Å) a unit of length (equal to 1×10^{−10} metres)
- Area (A)
- Attenuation coefficient (a)
- Rotational constant (A)
- Specific surface area (a)
- A-frame, a type of structure

== Arts, media, and entertainment ==
=== Books ===
- "A", a poem by twentieth century author Louis Zukofsky
- a, A Novel, by twentieth century artist Andy Warhol
- A, the name of the Fourth Raikage, the leader of Kumogakure in the Naruto manga series
- A (Pretty Little Liars), the main antagonist in the Pretty Little Liars book and TV series
- A (for "adultery"), the titular letter in the novel The Scarlet Letter
- "A" Is for Alibi, the first novel in Sue Grafton's "Alphabet mystery" series, published in 1982

=== Film and TV ===
==== Films ====
- A (1965 film), a short film animated by Jan Lenica
- A (1998 Indian film), directed by Upendra
- A (1998 Japanese film), a documentary about a Buddhist sect called "A"
- A (2002 film), a British documentary
- A (Ad Infinitum), a 2021 Indian film
- Alpha (2026 film), stylized as α, an Indian spy thriller, part of the YRF Spy Universe

==== Film ratings ====
- A, a rating in India's Central Board of Film Certification
- A certificate, used by the Canadian motion picture rating system
- A, a British Board of Film Classification rating used from 1912 to 1982; see History of British film certificates

==== Television channels ====
- CTV 2, a Canadian television system formerly known as A-Channel and A
- "A"-logo for the Spanish network Antena 3
- Canal A, a defunct Colombian television network
- Rete A, a defunct Italian television network
- Cadena A, a Bolivian television network

==== Television ====
- "A" (The Walking Dead), an episode of the television series The Walking Dead
- Ange, the main protagonist of the anime show Princess Principal, code name A
- 1963 Doctor Who serial An Unearthly Child (production code "A")

=== Music ===
==== Musical notation ====
- A, the sixth solfège note; see Letter notation
  - A major, a scale
  - A minor, a scale
  - A major chord; see Chord names and symbols (popular music)
  - A440 (pitch standard)

==== Performers ====
- A (band), a British alternative rock band

==== Albums ====
- A (Agnetha Fältskog album), 2013
- A (Cass McCombs album), 2003
- A (Jimmy Raney album), 1957
- A (Jethro Tull album), 1980
- A (Usher and Zaytoven album), 2018
- A, a Denki Groove album (read as "Ace")
- A (Ayumi Hamasaki EP), 1999
- A (single album), a 2015 single by the Korean band Big Bang
- A! (album), by Alexa Feser, 2019
- A' (album), by Afrirampo, 2004

==== Songs ====
- A or Side A, the top or first side of a gramophone record
- "A" (Rainbow song), 2010
- "A" (Got7 song), 2014
- "A", by A from 'A' vs. Monkey Kong
- "A", by the band Barenaked Ladies from Maybe You Should Drive
- "A", by Cartel from Chroma

=== Gaming ===
- A, a Japanese video game rating in the Computer Entertainment Rating Organization (suitable for all ages)
- Ace, a playing card

=== Other media ===
- /a/, the anime and manga section on 4chan

== Education ==
- A (grade), an academic grade
- Aalto University, public research university in Espoo, Finland

== Linguistics ==
=== Letters ===
- A (or a), the first letter of the Latin alphabet
- A (Indic), the many form of brahmic "a"
- A (Bengali), the romanized name of the Bengali letter অ
- A (cuneiform), the romanized name of a cuneiform sign
- A (Cyrillic) (A or а), the first letter of the Cyrillic alphabet
- A (hangul)
- A (kana) (or a), the romanized name of the Hiragana syllable letter あ and of the Katakana syllable letter ア used in Japanese, which may also be used to represent Asia
- Alpha (Α or α), the first letter of the Greek alphabet
- A (Malayalam), the romanized name of the Malayalam letter അ

=== Other uses in linguistics ===
- A and an, the indefinite article in English
- A, a glossing abbreviation for agent-like argument of canonical transitive verb
- a, the IPA representation of the open front unrounded vowel
- ɑ, the IPA representation of the open back unrounded vowel
- ante (Latin for "before") used in etymologies, abbreviated "a."

== People ==
- A (pharaoh), an Egyptian pharaoh
- A Martinez, an American actor and singer
- Matthew Arnold, who used the pseudonym "A"
- Isaac Asimov, who used the pseudonym "Dr. A"
- Alexander Pope, who used the pseudonym "A"
- Brfxxccxxmnpcccclllmmnprxvclmnckssqlbb11116, a Swedish child born in 1991, alternately called "A"

== Places ==
- "The A", a nickname for the U.S. city of Atlanta, Georgia
- Sentinel Peak (Arizona), more commonly known as "A" Mountain for the human-made rock formation in the shape of the letter
- Austria, on the vehicle registration plates of the European Union
- Banten (vehicle registration prefix A)

== Sports ==
- A formation, an American football offensive formation
- Oakland A's, or the Athletics, a professional baseball team based in Oakland, California, US

== Transportation ==
=== Automobile ===
- Farmall A, a tractor produced by International Harvester from 1939 to 1947
- Ford Model A, a name used by two separate cars produced by the Ford Motor Company:
  - Ford Model A (1903–04)
  - Ford Model A (1927–31)
- Geometry A, an electric mid-size sedan by Geely Auto

=== Rail ===
- A (S-train), a service on the S-train network in Copenhagen
- Line A (Buenos Aires Underground) of the Buenos Aires Subte
- Line A (Prague Metro)
- Mexico City Metro Line A
- NZR A class (disambiguation) two New Zealand steam locomotive classes
- RER A, a line in the RER of Paris
- Lyon Metro Line A
- Toei Asakusa Line, a subway service operated by the Tokyo Metropolitan Bureau of Transportation (Toei), labeled
- The official West Japan Railway Company service symbol for:
  - Akō Line, Biwako Line, Kobe Line, Kyoto Line, Hokuriku Main Line, San'yō Main Line, and JR West Tōkaidō Line
  - San'in Main Line
- US:
  - A (Los Angeles Railway)
  - A (New York City Subway service), also known as the "A Eighth Avenue Express"
  - Alton Railroad (reporting mark)
  - A Line (Los Angeles Metro)
- Britain:
  - LCDR A class, British 0-4-4T steam locomotives introduced in 1875
  - LD&ECR Class A, British 0-6-2T steam locomotives introduced in 1895
  - LNWR Class A, British 0-8-0 steam locomotives introduced in 1893
  - NER Class A, British 2-4-2T steam locomotives introduced in 1886
  - SER A class, British 4-4-0 steam locomotives introduced in 1879
  - Taff Vale Railway A class, British 0-6-2T steam locomotives introduced in 1914

=== Ships ===
- A (motor yacht) (M/Y A), a 119m yacht owned by Andrey Melnichenko
- A (sailing yacht) (S/Y A), a 143m yacht owned by Andrey Melnichenko
- SMS A, a Kaiserliche Marine tanker

== Other uses ==
- A series of paper sizes defined by ISO 216, e.g. A4, A5 sizes
- Alfa, the military time zone code for UTC+01:00
- A, the Dominical letter of a common year starting on Sunday
- Alpha, (sometimes A) in Christian theology, a metaphor for the beginning/creation of time and matter
- The Gregory-Åland siglum for the Codex Alexandrinus
- Scarlet A, symbol for atheism adopted by the Out Campaign, a public awareness initiative proposed by Elizabeth Cornwell and Richard Dawkins
- An anarchist symbol, an A within a circle
- Agilent Technologies, with U.S. ticker symbol A

== See also ==
- Å (disambiguation)
- A' (disambiguation)
- ⓐ and Ⓐ; see Enclosed Alphanumerics
- Class A (disambiguation)
- Model A (disambiguation)
- Circled a (disambiguation)
- Single-A, or Class A, a classification of minor league baseball
- A band (disambiguation)
- A class (disambiguation)
- A type (disambiguation)
- Aleph (disambiguation)
- Alpha (disambiguation)
- A1 (disambiguation)
- AA (disambiguation)
- AAA (disambiguation)
- AAAA (disambiguation)
