= A class =

A class or A-class may refer to:

== Locomotives ==
- CIÉ A class or CIÉ 001 Class, a 1955 class of Co-Co diesel locomotives used by Córas Iompair Éireann (The Irish Transport Company)
- Metropolitan Railway A Class, a class of steam locomotives operated by the Metropolitan Railway
- MGWR Class A, a class of steam locomotives operated by the Midland Great Western Railway
- Milwaukee Road class A, a class of steam locomotives operated by the Milwaukee Road
- MRWA A class, a class of steam locomotives operated by the Midland Railway of Western Australia
- NBR A class, a class of steam locomotives operated by the North British Railway
- Norfolk and Western Class A, a class of steam locomotives operated by the Norfolk and Western Railway
- NZR A class (1873), a class of steam tank locomotives operated by the New Zealand Railways Department
- NZR A class (1906), a class of steam tender locomotives operated by the New Zealand Railways Department
- Silverton Tramway A class, a class of steam locomotives operated by the Silverton Tramway
- South Australian Railways A class, a class of steam locomotives operated by the South Australian Railways
- Tasmanian Government Railways A class, a class of steam locomotives operated by the Tasmanian Government Railways
- V/Line A class, a class of diesel locomotives that operates in Victoria, Australia
- Victorian Railways NA class, a class of narrow-gauge (hence "N") steam tank locomotives
- WAGR A class, 2-6-0 steam locomotives of the Western Australian Government Railways
- WAGR A class (diesel), locomotives of the Western Australian Government Railways

== Trams ==
- A-class Melbourne tram, a single-unit bogie tram that operates in Melbourne, Australia

== Boats ==
- A-class destroyer (1913), heterogeneous group of British torpedo boat destroyers built in the mid-1890s
- A-class destroyer (1929), British destroyers of World War II
- A-class torpedo boat, German torpedo boats of World War I
- A-class submarine (disambiguation), several classes of submarines
- A-class minehunter, ships of the Turkish Navy
- International A-class catamaran, a development class sailing catamaran for singlehanded racing
- International A Class, a class of radio-controlled sailing yacht

== Other uses ==
- A Class (album), studio album by South Korean girl group miss A
- A-segment, a European vehicle size class
- Mercedes-Benz A-Class, a range of subcompact hatchbacks and sedans
- A class (schools), system of categorizing school for sport competitions
- WikiProject#WikiProjects and assessments of article importance and quality, on Wikipedia

== See also ==
- Class A (disambiguation)
- A type (disambiguation)
- A series (disambiguation)
- Class (disambiguation)
