= A series =

A series may refer to:

== Technology ==
- A-series light bulb, the most common type of light bulbs used since the early 20th century
- Canon PowerShot A, camera
- Fujifilm FinePix A series, camera series
- Samsung Galaxy A series, a line of mid-range smartphones
- Tool steel A series, air hardened, a type of tool steel
- Sony Vaio A series, of laptops
- Toshiba Satellite A series, of laptops
- Walkman A Series, by Sony

== Transportation ==
- BMC A-series engine, a small straight-4 automobile engine produced by the Austin Motor Company
- Honda A engine
- International A series, pickup truck
- Transperth A-series train, a type of electric multiple unit used by Transperth Trains in Perth, Western Australia

== Other uses ==
- QI (A series), the first series of the TV quiz show QI
- Series A, venture capital financing round for startups
- Series A banknotes, Irish banknotes
- ISO 216 A series, paper sizes defined by the ISO 216 standard, including A4 paper size
- A series and B series, two philosophical descriptions of the temporal ordering of events

== See also ==
- A class (disambiguation)
