= A type =

A type or type A may refer to:

== Science ==
- A-type asteroid, a type of relatively uncommon inner-belt asteroids
- A type blood, a type in the ABO blood group system
- A-type inclusion, a type of cell inclusion
- A-type potassium channel, a type of voltage-gated potassium channel
- A type proanthocyanidin, a specific type of flavonoids
- A-type star, a class of stars
- Type A climate, a type in the Köppen climate classification
- Type A flu, a type of influenza virus
- Type A evaluation of uncertainty, an uncertainty in measurement that can be inferred, for example, from repeated measurement
- Type A personality, a personality type in the Type A and Type B personality theory
- Hemophilia type A, a type of haemophilia
- A-type granite, a type of granite rock
- Adenosine receptor

== Technology ==
- Type A Dolby Noise Reduction, a type of Dolby noise-reduction system
- Type A videotape, a reel-to-reel helical scan analog recording videotape format
- Type A plug (see also NEMA connector)
- Type A submarine, a class of submarines in the Imperial Japanese Navy which served during the Second World War
- Renault A-Type engine, a straight-4 automobile engine
- Toyota Type A engine
- Vauxhall A-Type, a car manufactured by Vauxhall Motors from 1908 to 1915
- A type Adelaide tram

== Arts and entertainment ==
- Type A (label), a music label that for example produced the 2004 album What Doesn't Kill You... by Candiria
- Type A (artist collective), a pair of New York-based artists named Adam Ames and Andrew Bordwin

== See also ==
- A Types, the third full-length album released by the melodic hardcore band Hopesfall
- A class (disambiguation)
- Class A (disambiguation)
- Model A (disambiguation)
