= We Are Acid Mothers Afrirampo! =

Studio album by Acid Mothers Afrirampo
- Released: December 2005
- Genre: Psychedelic rock, acid rock
- Length: 56:21
- Label: Acid Mothers Temple
- Producer: Kawabata Makoto

Professional ratings
Review scores
Source	Rating
Pitchfork Media	(7.2/10)

We Are Acid Mothers Afrirampo! is an album by members of Afrirampo and Acid Mothers Temple, under the band name Acid Mothers Afrirampo.

== History ==
Plans for an Afrirampo and Acid Mothers Temple collaboration began in the spring of 2004, but instead Oni and Pikachu left Japan to study music in Africa.

== Track list ==
All tracks are written by Acid Mothers Afrirampo

No.	Title	Length
1.	"We're Acid Mothers Afrirampo!"	27:41
2.	"The Exorcist Of Love"	12:00
3.	"The Man From The Magic Mountain"	16:40

== Personnel ==
Acid Mothers Afrirampo consists of Afrirampo members Oni and Pikachu and Acid Mothers Temple leader Kawabata Makoto and members Tsuyama Atsushi and Higashi Hiroshi.

- Oni - voice, electric guitar, degital guitar, soprano recorder, drums
- Pikachu - voice, drums, percussion, toys, balloon
- Tsuyama Atsushi - voice, bass, drums, degital guitar, acoustic guitar, soprano recorder, kantele
- Higashi Hiroshi - electronics
- Kawabata Makoto - electric guitar, violin, hurdygurdy, glockenspiel, percussion, electronics, voice

=== Technical personnel ===
- Kawabata Makoto - production, mixing and engineering
- K. Hara - engineering
- Yoshida Tatsuya - digital mastering
- Kawabata Sachiko - artwork
- Hayasaka Tomohiro - live photography
