= Å (disambiguation) =

Å (historically Aa) is a letter used in several Scandinavian, High German, and Finno-Permic languages.

Å may also refer to:

== Places ==
Å ([oː] or [ɔ]) means stream or river in Scandinavian languages. A number of places have been named Å:

=== Norway ===
- Å, Andøy, a village in Andøy municipality, Nordland county (Vesterålen)
- Å, Ibestad, a village in Ibestad municipality, Troms county
- Å, Lavangen, a village in Lavangen municipality, Troms county
- Å, Moskenes, a village in Moskenes municipality, Nordland county (Lofoten)
- Å, Orkland, a village in Orkland municipality, Trøndelag county
- Å, Senja, a village in Senja municipality, Troms county
- Å, Åfjord, a village in Åfjord municipality, Trøndelag county
- Åfjord Municipality, a municipality in Trøndelag county (named simply "Å Municipality" from 1896 to 1963)

=== Sweden ===
- Å, Östergötland, a village in Norrköping Municipality in Östergötland county
- Å, a village in Örnsköldsvik Municipality in Västernorrland county
- Å, a village in Kramfors Municipality in Västernorrland county
- Å, a village in Söderhamn Municipality in Gävleborg county
- Å, a village in Uddevalla Municipality in Västra Götaland county

=== Denmark ===
- Å, a village in Assens Municipality in Funen County

== Other ==
- Ångström, a unit of length (abbreviation: Å)

== See also ==
- A (disambiguation)
- AA (disambiguation)
- List of short place names
