= A band =

A band may refer to:

- A band (NATO), a range of radio frequencies
- A-band, an absorption band for molecular oxygen
- A Band, a musical improvisation group, originally from Nottingham, England
- A band (anatomy), the anisotropic band in sarcomeres
- A (band), a rock band from Suffolk, England
- A band, a group of musicians

== See also ==
- A (disambiguation)
