= A' =

A' (A + apostrophe) may refer to:

- The compose key sequence for Á (A + acute accent)
- a', one of the determiners in Scottish Gaelic grammar
- A' (album), a 2004 music album

== See also ==
- Aʼ (A + modifier apostrophe)
- A′ (A + prime)
- Aʻ (A + ʻokina)
- Ả (A + hook above)
- Aʾ (A + right half ring)
- Aʿ (A + left half ring)
- À (A + grave accent)
