= Suuto Breakor =

Studio album by Afrirampo
- Released: September 7, 2007
- Genre: Experimental rock, Psychedelic rock
- Length: 41:57
- Label: P-Vine Records

Professional ratings
Review scores
Source	Rating
Pitchfork Media	7.5/10

Suuto Breakor (スートブレイコー) is an album by Osaka-based band Afrirampo, released in 2007. The albums consists of a single 42-minute song, divided into 7 parts on the track listing.

== Track listing ==
1. スートブレイコー 1 (6:38)
2. スートブレイコー 2 (7:17)
3. スートブレイコー 3 (2:13)
4. スートブレイコー 4 (7:48)
5. スートブレイコー 5 (8:11)
6. スートブレイコー 6 (5:48)
7. スートブレイコー 7 (4:01)
