= Kore Ga Mayaku Da =

Studio album by Afrirampo
- Released: June 21, 2005
- Genre: Rock
- Length: 50:00
- Label: Tzadik

Professional ratings
Review scores
Source	Rating
AllMusic	3.5/5 stars
Pitchfork	7.9/10
Tiny Mix Tapes	4.5/5 stars

Kore Ga Mayaku Da is an album by Afrirampo, released on John Zorn's Tzadik label. The title translates to "This is a poison."

== Track listing ==
1. "I Did Are" - 13:37
2. "O" - 2:35
3. "Kairaku Do Re Mi" - 1:22
4. "Want You" - 4:04
5. "I Am Bird" - 1:40
6. "Pekkopa in Brooklyn" - 1:51
7. "Nakimushikemushi Good Bye!" - 7:59
8. "Kui! Kui!" - 1:24
9. "On Ska to Paar Ya" - 5:06
10. "Hadaka" - 9:17
11. "Matane ♂" - 1:13

== Personnel ==
- Oni: Guitar, Voice
- Pikachu: Drums, Voice
