= Circled a =

Circled a, @, Ⓐ, (A), or variations thereof may refer to:

- Circled A (ⓐ,Ⓐ), an "A" inscribed inside a circle; see Enclosed Alphanumerics
- At sign (@), used in email/X/Instagram addresses, macro signifiers, prices
- Circle-A ( or), a symbol of the anarchist movement.
- The trademark on the radiators of Atkinson lorries
- United States Third Army, whose shoulder insignia is an A in a circle.
- Arroba (@), a unit of mass
- @ (album), a 2013 album by John Zorn and Thurston Moore
- @ (band), an American folk pop duo
- a symbol of New Atheism

== See also ==
- A (disambiguation)
