= Model A =

Model A may refer to:

- Ford Model A (1927–31), a model of car built by the Ford Motor Company
- Ford Model A (1903–04), a model of car built by the Ford Motor Company
- One of the letter-series models of Farmall tractors
- John Deere Model A, a model of John Deere tractor build by Deere & Company
- A structural model of personality in Socionics
- A character mode in the video game Mega Man ZX Advent
- Chu Hummingbird Model A, an experimental co-axial helicopter
- Ritz Model A, ultralight aircraft
- Wright Model A, an early aircraft
- Alef Model A, a proposed flying car by Alef Aeronautics

== See also ==
- Class A (disambiguation)
- Type A (disambiguation)
