= A-class submarine =

A-class submarine may refer to one of these classes of submarine:

- A-class submarine, a class of 13 submarines of the Royal Navy that served in World War I
- Havmanden-class submarine, a class of six built for the Royal Danish Navy, 1911–1914
- Norwegian A-class submarine, a class built for the Royal Norwegian Navy in 1913
- American Holland-class submarine, also later known as Soviet A-class submarine, submarines launched in 1916
- Spanish A-class submarine, three Italian F-class submarines built for the Spanish Navy and launched in 1917
- Plunger-class submarine, a class of seven US Navy submarines built before World War I; also known as the "A class"
- Amphion-class submarine (also called the Archeron class), a class of sixteen submarines of the Royal Navy that served in World War II; also known as the "A class"
- The Japanese Type A submarine, three classes submarines:
  - I-9-class submarine (Type A1 submarine)
  - I-12-class submarine (Type A2 submarine)
  - I-13-class submarine (Type AM submarine)
