= NBR A class =

Class of British steam locomotives

NBR A Class LNER Classes N14 & N15
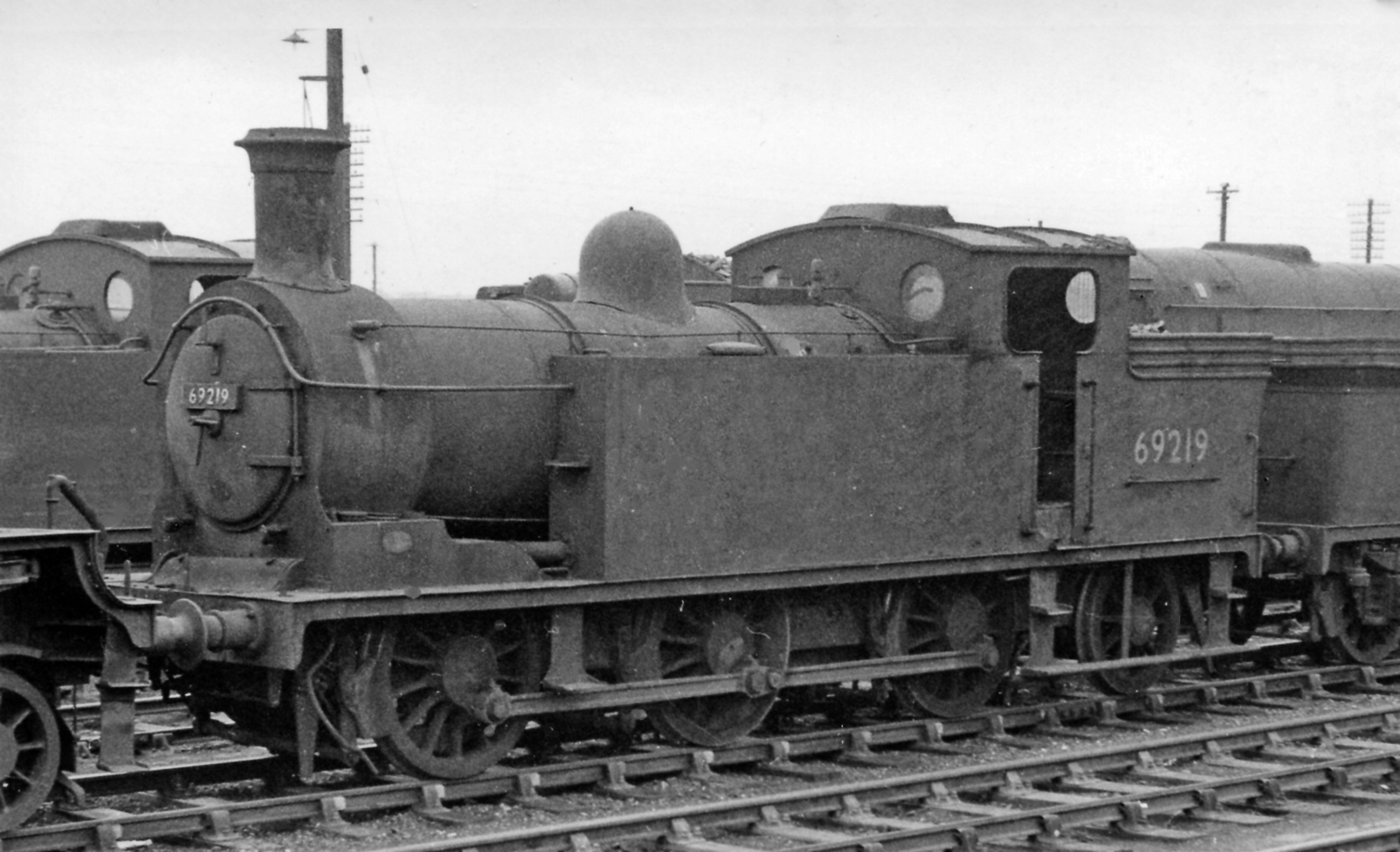
- N15/1 No. 69219 at Bathgate Locomotive Depot 19 September 1962
Type and origin
- Power type: Steam
- Designer: William P. Reid
- Builder: North British Locomotive Company, Robert Stephenson and Company
- Build date: 1909-1923
- Total produced: 105
Specifications
- Configuration
  - Whyte: 0-6-2
  - UIC: C‘1
- Gauge: 4 ft 8 1/2 in (1,435 mm)
- Driver dia.: 4 ft 6 in (1.372 m)
- Trailing dia.: 3 ft 9 in (1.143 m)
- Loco weight: various see below
- Fuel type: Coal
- Boiler pressure: 175 lbf/in^{2} (1.21 MPa)
- Cylinders: Two, inside
- Cylinder size: 18 in × 26 in (457 mm × 660 mm)
- Valve gear: Stephenson
Performance figures
- Tractive effort: 23,205 lbf (103.22 kN)
Career
- Operators: North British Railway; London and North Eastern Railway; British Railways
- Withdrawn: 1947-1962
- Disposition: All scrapped

The NBR A Class/London and North Eastern Railway (LNER) Classes N14 and N15 were the standard 0-6-2 tank locomotives designed by William P. Reid for freight duties on the North British Railway. The LNER regarded the original locomotives as two separate classes (N14 & N15). The final batch of locomotives was on order at the time of the grouping in 1923.

== History ==
=== N14 Class ===
The original six locomotive introduced in 1909 and had inside cylinders and piston valves operated by Stephenson valve gear, and weighed 62 LT 10 cwt (63.5 t). They were built by the North British Locomotive Company and numbered 858-863. They were withdrawn 1947-1954.

=== N15/1 Class ===
53 similar locomotives were built by the North British Locomotive Company between June 1910 March 1917 with longer cabs but shorter bunkers. They were fitted with Steam brakes and used on freight duties. A further batch of ten locomotives was built by North British Locomotive Company in February and March 1920. A third batch of ten was on order from Robert Stephenson and Company when the North British Railway became a constituent of the LNER. They were delivered between January and March 1923. They weighed 60 LT 18 cwt (61.9 t) and were numbered to fill gaps in the sequence between 20 and 926. Two of these locomotives were later fitted with Westinghouse brakes in 1929 and were re-classified N15/2. The remainder were withdrawn between 1957 and 1962.

=== N15/2 Class ===
Six N15/1 locomotives were built by the North British Locomotive Company with Westinghouse brakes in 1910. They were used to bank passenger trains up the 1 in 42 Cowlairs incline leading from Glasgow Queen Street railway station. Prior to 1910 trains had been rope hauled by a stationary engine. A further two N15/1 were converted to N15/2 in 1929. They weighed 62 LT 1 cwt (63.0 t) and were numbered to fill gaps in the sequence between 7 and 282 and were withdrawn between 1957 and 1962.
