= Silverton Tramway A class =

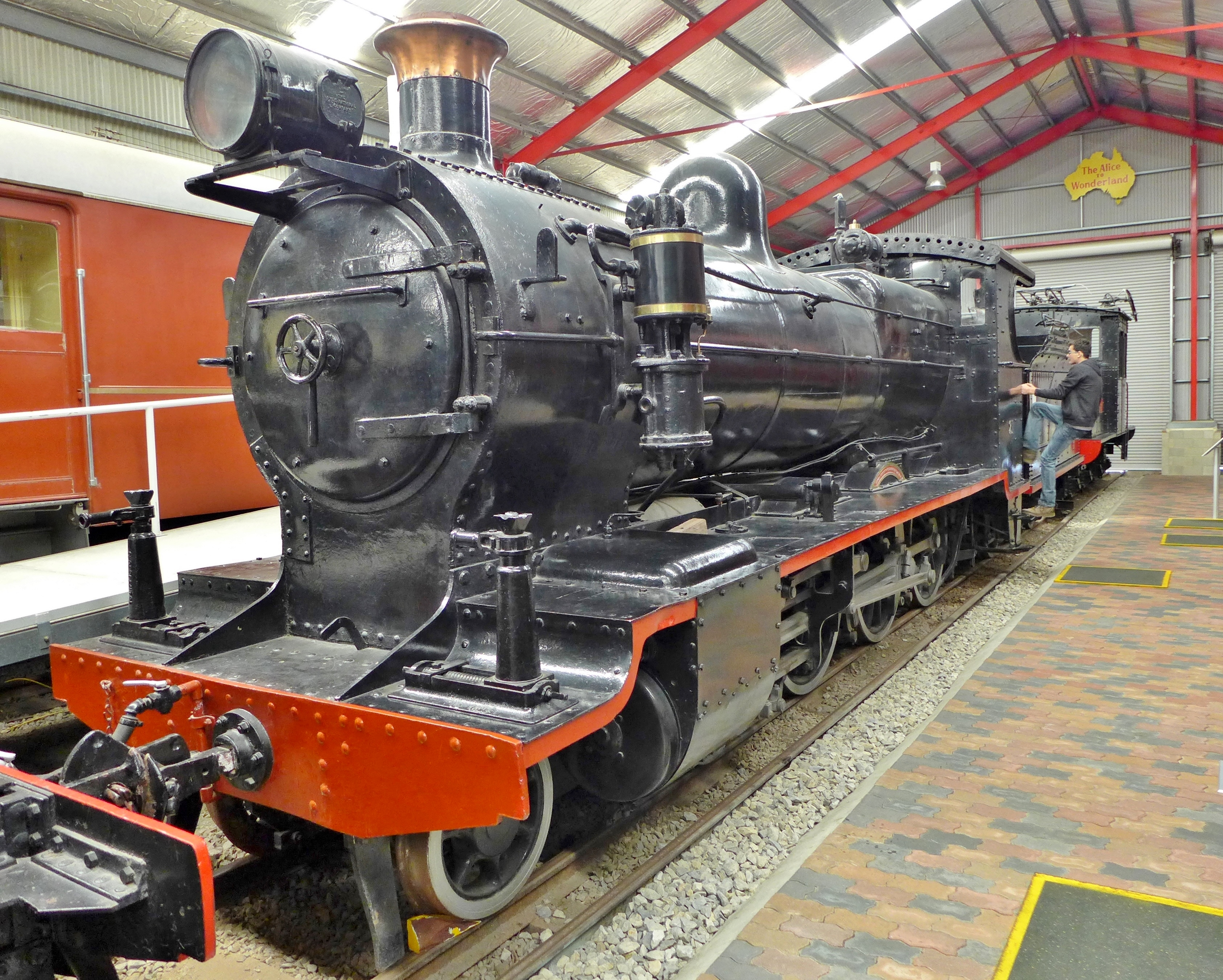
Type and origin
- Power type: Steam
- Builder: Beyer, Peacock & Co
- Build date: 1912, 1915
- Total produced: 4
Specifications
- Configuration
  - Whyte: 4-6-0
- Gauge: 1,067 mm (3 ft 6 in)
- Driver dia.: 4 ft 3 in (1,295 mm)
- Total weight: 59 long tons 2 cwt (132,400 lb or 60 t)
- Fuel type: Coal
- Tender cap.: 3 long tons 0 cwt (6,700 lb or 3 t)
- Boiler pressure: 185 lbf/in^{2} (1.28 MPa)
- Cylinder size: Original: 16.5 in × 20 in (419 mm × 508 mm); Rebuilt: 16.5 in × 22 in (419 mm × 559 mm)
Performance figures
- Tractive effort: Original: 15,801 lbf (70.29 kN); Rebuilt: 17,381 lbf (77.31 kN)
- Factor of adh.: 3.52
Career
- Operators: Silverton Tramway Company
- Numbers: A18-A21
- Preserved: A21
- Disposition: 1 preserved, 3 scrapped

The Silverton Tramway A class was a class of 4-6-0 steam locomotives operated by the Silverton Tramway Company.

== History ==
The Silverton Tramway Company took delivery of two 4-6-0 locomotives in 1912 from Beyer, Peacock & Co, Manchester followed by another two in 1915.

They were built with small tenders so as to keep them within the limits imposed by the fifty foot turntables and operated both passenger and freight services on the Silverton Tramway. Between 1924 and 1926, all were fitted with superheaters.

After the arrival of the W class in 1951, they were relegated to trip working between the various mines in Broken Hill. During World War II and again in the 1950s, they were leased to the South Australian Railways for shunting duties at Peterborough. The last was withdrawn in January 1961.

A21 has been preserved at the National Railway Museum, Port Adelaide.

== Class list ==
Number	Builder's number	Year built	Notes
A18	5528	1912	scrapped July 1963
A19	5590	1912	scrapped 1953
A20	5912	1915	scrapped July 1963
A21	5913	1915	preserved at the Mile End Railway Museum October 1965, now on display at the National Railway Museum, Port Adelaide
