= Toshiba Satellite A series =

Series of laptops by Toshiba

Satellite A series

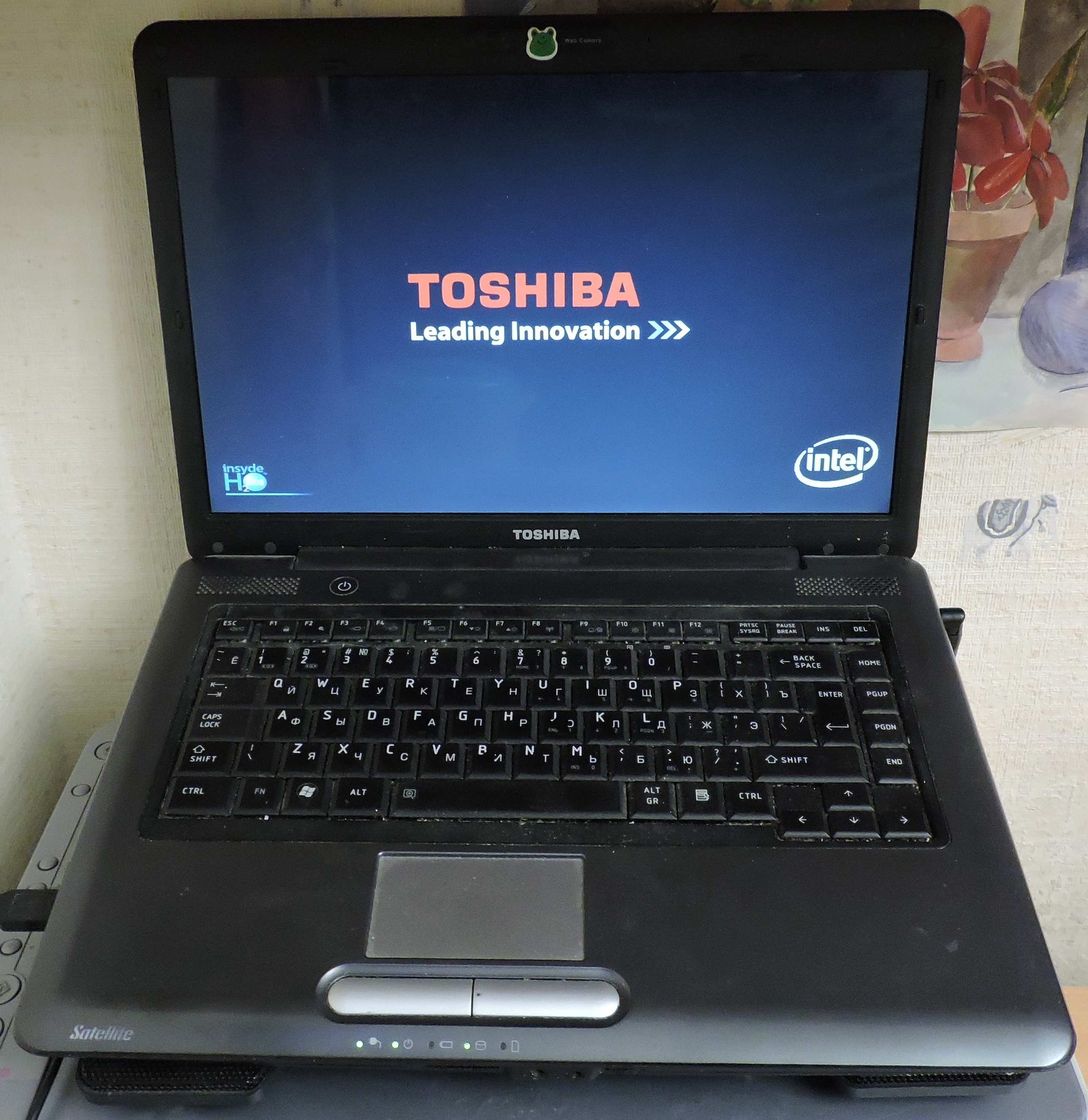
- Satellite A300
- Developer: Toshiba Information Systems Corporation
- Type: Laptop
- Released: 2003
- Lifespan: 2003–2010
- Discontinued: 2010

The Satellite A series was Toshiba Information Systems's premium consumer line of Satellite laptops. Introduced with the A10 and A20 models in 2003, the A series originally targeted high school and college students and workers of small offices and home offices, before becoming a premium line by the late 2000s.

Prices of models in the series in 2003 ranged from roughly US$800 to US$1200; it sold especially well in among the SOHO segment. Some laptops in the series constituted desktop replacements because of their heft: the A45 was lauded by PC Magazine and PC World for its battery life and multimedia capabilities, especially the quality of its speakers, but PC Magazine wrote that its 7.6-lb weight made the laptop good only “for occasional mobile use”. Other models, such as the A105, were fairly light for the time, at 6 lb, though battery life was observed to have suffered as a consequence, according to PC Magazine. The magazine wrote that the A105 and A75 were particularly adept at home video capture and editing, while the A65 was rated particularly poorly.

The last entry in the series, the A665, had submodels capable of stereoscopic graphics rendering with its special LCD that was compatible with the Nvidia 3D Vision active shutter glasses.

The Satellite A series was superseded by the P series in 2011.

== Models ==
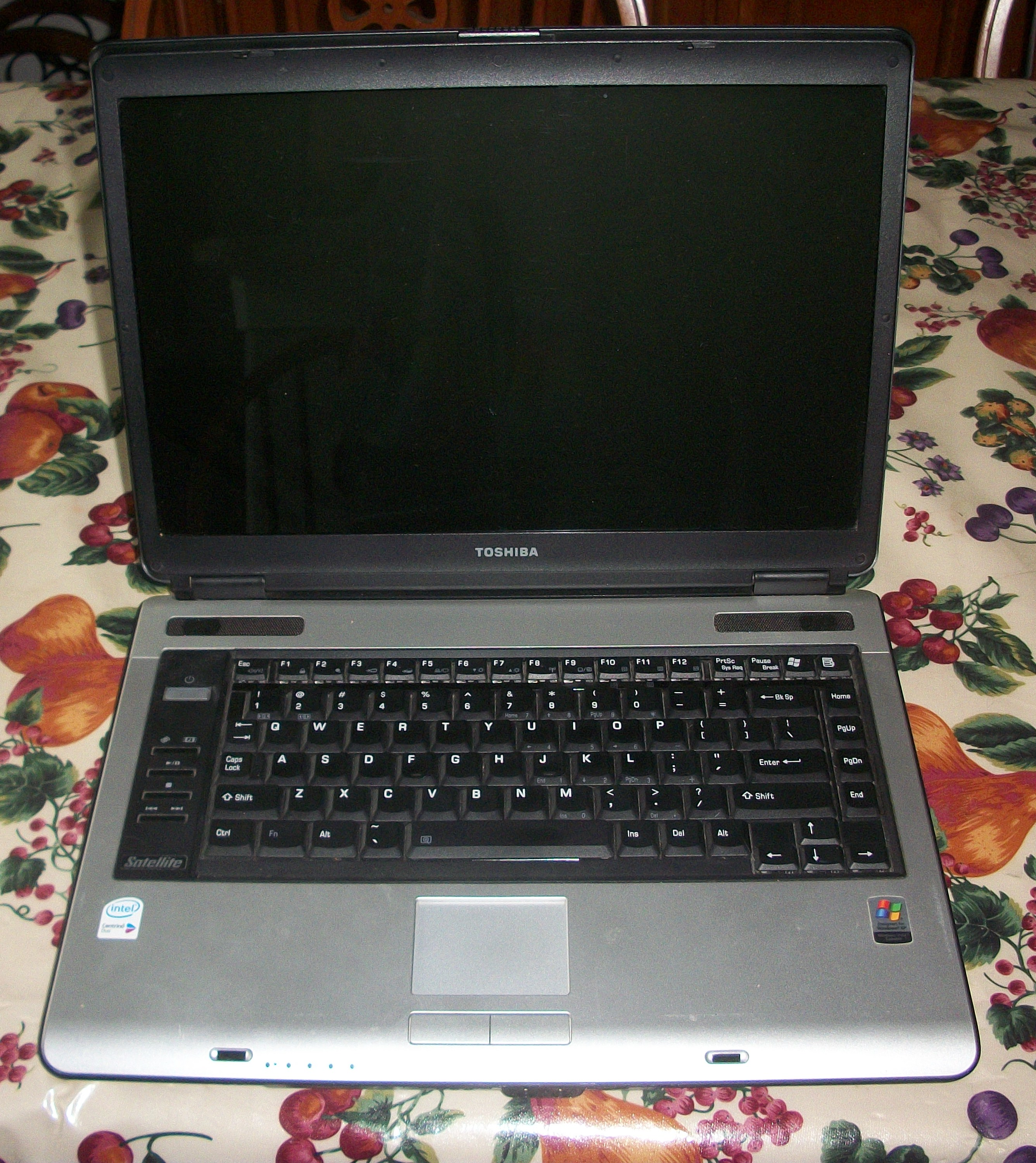
Satellite A105

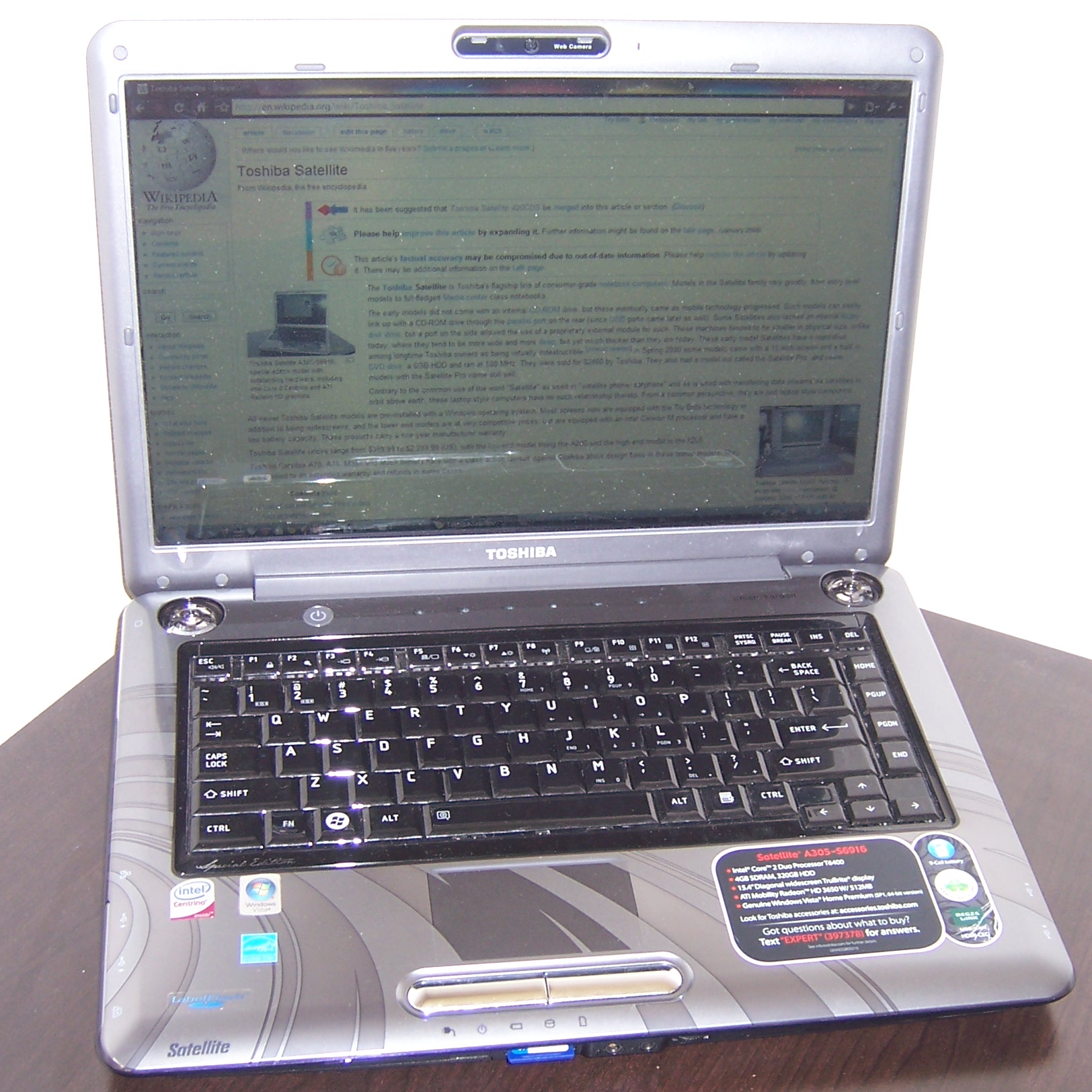
Satellite A305 Special Edition

Toshiba Satellite A series models
Model no.	TFT display diagonal size (in.)	Processor	Chipset	Clock speed (GHz)	Graphics	RAM	Storage	Networking	Audio	Operating system	Toshiba datasheet
A10-S100	15.0	Intel Mobile Celeron	Intel 852GM	2.50	Intel 852GM @ 32 MB	256 MB SODIMM PC2100 DDR (max. 1024 MB)	40 GB (4200 RPM) HDD	V.92/56K modem; 10/100 Ethernet LAN; Wireless LAN	Analog Devices AD1981 with Sound Blaster Pro compatibility and built-in stereo speakers	Windows XP Home (A10-S1001); Windows XP Pro (A10-S100 / A10-S100 SB)	A10-S100
A10-S127	15.0	Intel Mobile Celeron	Intel 852GM	2.00	Intel 852GM @ 32 MB	256 MB SODIMM PC2100 DDR (max. 1024 MB)	30 GB (4200 RPM) HDD	V.92/56K modem; 10/100 Ethernet LAN; Wireless LAN (802.11b)	Analog Devices AD1981 with Sound Blaster Pro compatibility and built-in stereo speakers	Windows XP Pro (A10-S127); Windows XP Home (A10-S128)	A10-S127
A10-S129	15.0	Intel Mobile Celeron	Intel 852GM	2.40	Intel 852GM @ 32 MB	256 MB SODIMM PC2100 DDR (max. 1024 MB)	40 GB (4200 RPM) HDD	V.92/56K modem; 10/100 Ethernet LAN; Wireless LAN	Analog Devices AD1981 with Sound Blaster Pro compatibility and built-in stereo speakers	Windows XP Pro (A10-S129); Windows XP Home (A10-S1291)	A10-S129
A10-S167	15.0	Intel Mobile Pentium 4		2.20	Intel 852GM @ 32 MB	256 MB SODIMM PC2100 DDR (max. 1024 MB)	30 GB (4200 RPM) HDD	V.92/56K modem; 10/100 Ethernet LAN; Wireless LAN (802.11b)	Analog Devices AD1981 with Sound Blaster Pro compatibility and built-in stereo speakers		A10-S167
A10-S169	15.0	Intel Mobile Pentium 4		2.20	Intel 852GM @ 32 MB	256 MB SODIMM PC2100 DDR (max. 1024 MB)	40 GB (4200 RPM) HDD	V.92/56K modem; 10/100 Ethernet LAN; Wireless LAN	Analog Devices AD1981 with Sound Blaster Pro compatibility and built-in stereo speakers		A10-S169
A10-S177	15.0	Intel Mobile Pentium 4		2.20	Intel 852GM @ 32 MB	256 MB SODIMM PC2100 DDR (max. 1024 MB)	40 GB (4200 RPM) HDD	V.92/56K modem; 10/100 Ethernet LAN; Wireless LAN (802.11b)	Analog Devices AD1981 with Sound Blaster Pro compatibility and built-in stereo speakers		A10-S177
A15-S127	15.0	Intel Celeron		2.00	Intel 852GM @ 32 MB	256 MB SODIMM PC2100 DDR (max. 1024 MB)	30 GB (4200 RPM) HDD	V.92/56K modem; 10/100 Ethernet LAN; Wireless LAN (802.11b)	Analog Devices AD1981 with Sound Blaster Pro compatibility and built-in stereo speakers		A15-S127
A15-S129	15.0	Intel Celeron		2.40	Intel 852GM @ 32 MB	256 MB SODIMM PC2100 DDR (max. 1024 MB)	40 GB (4200 RPM) HDD	V.92/56K modem; 10/100 Ethernet LAN; Wireless LAN	Analog Devices AD1981 with Sound Blaster Pro compatibility and built-in stereo speakers		A15-S129
A15-S157	15.0	Intel Celeron		2.20	Intel 852GM @ 32 MB		40 GB (4200 RPM) HDD	V.92/56K modem; 10/100 Ethernet LAN; Wireless LAN (802.11b)	Analog Devices AD1981 with Sound Blaster Pro compatibility and built-in stereo speakers		A15-S157
A15-S1292	15.0	Intel Celeron		2.40	Intel 852GM @ 32 MB		30 GB (4200 RPM) HDD	V.92/56K modem; 10/100 Ethernet LAN	Analog Devices AD1981 with Sound Blaster Pro compatibility and built-in stereo speakers		A15-S1292
A20-S207	15.4 XGA	Intel Pentium 4 2660		2.66	Trident CyberBlade XP2 @ 32 MB		40 GB (4200 RPM) HDD	V.92/56K modem; 10/100 Ethernet LAN; Wireless LAN (802.11b)	Analog Devices AD1981B with built-in stereo speakers		A20-S207
A20-S259	15.0	Intel Pentium 4 2660		2.66	Trident CyberBlade XP2 @ 32 MB		40 GB (4200 RPM) HDD	V.92/56K modem; 10/100 Ethernet LAN; Wireless LAN (802.11g)	Analog Devices AD1981B with built-in stereo speakers		A20-S259
A25-S207	15.0	Intel Pentium 4 2660		2.66	Trident CyberBlade XP2 @ 32 MB		40 GB (4200 RPM) HDD	V.92/56K modem; 10/100 Ethernet LAN; Wireless LAN (802.11b)	Analog Devices AD1981B with built-in stereo speakers		A25-S207
A25-S2792	15.0	Intel Pentium 4 3060		3.06	Trident CyberBlade XP2 @ 32 MB		80 GB (4200 RPM) HDD	V.92/56K modem; 10/100 Ethernet LAN; Wireless LAN (802.11g)	Analog Devices AD1981B with built-in stereo speakers		A25-S2792
A25-S279	15.0	Intel Pentium 4 2800		2.80	Trident CyberBlade XP2 @ 32 MB		60 GB (4200 RPM) HDD	V.92/56K modem; 10/100 Ethernet LAN; Wireless LAN (802.11g)	Analog Devices AD1981B with built-in stereo speakers		A25-S279
A25-S307	15.0	Intel Pentium 4 2800		2.80	Trident CyberBlade XP2 @ 32 MB		60 GB (4200 RPM) HDD	V.92/56K modem; 10/100 Ethernet LAN; Wireless LAN (802.11a/b)	Analog Devices AD1981B with built-in stereo speakers		A25-S307
A35-S159	15.0	Intel Mobile Pentium 4		2.30	Intel 852GM @ 32 MB		60 GB (4200 RPM) HDD	V.92/56K modem; 10/100 Ethernet LAN; Wireless LAN (802.11g) module	Realtek ALC202 with built-in stereo speakers Windows Sound System V2.0 and Sound Blaster Pro compatible		A35-S159
A35-S209	15.0	Intel Pentium 4		2.80	Intel 852GM @ 32 MB		60 GB (4200 RPM) HDD	V.92/56K modem; 10/100 Ethernet LAN; Wireless LAN (802.11g) module	Realtek ALC202 with built-in stereo speakers Windows Sound System V2.0 and Sound Blaster Pro compatible		A35-S209
A35-S1592	15.0	Intel Celeron 2700		2.70	Intel 852GM @ 32 MB		40 GB (4200 RPM) HDD	V.92/56K modem; 10/100 Ethernet LAN; Wireless LAN (802.11g) module	Realtek ALC202 with built-in stereo speakers Windows Sound System V2.0 and Sound Blaster Pro compatible		A35-S1592
A35-S1593	15.0	Intel Celeron 2800		2.80	Intel 852GM @ 32 MB		40 GB (4200 RPM) HDD	V.92/56K modem; 10/100 Ethernet LAN; Wireless LAN (802.11g) module	Realtek ALC202 with built-in stereo speakers Windows Sound System V2.0 and Sound Blaster Pro compatible		A35-S1593
A40-S161	15.0	Intel Mobile Pentium 4		2.66	Intel 852GM @ 32 MB		40 GB (4200 RPM) HDD	V.92/56K modem; 10/100 Ethernet LAN; Wireless LAN (802.11g) module	Analog Devices AD1981B with built-in stereo speakers		A40-S161
A40-S270	15.0	Intel Mobile Pentium 4		2.80	Intel 852GME @ 32 MB		60 GB (4200 RPM) HDD		Analog Devices AD1981B with built-in stereo speakers		A40-S270
A45-S120	15.0	Intel Celeron		2.60	Intel 852GME @ 32 MB		40 GB (4200 RPM) HDD		Analog Devices AD1981B with built-in stereo speakers		A45-S120
A45-S121	15.0	Intel Celeron 2800		2.80	Intel 852GME @ 32 MB		40 GB (4200 RPM) HDD		Analog Devices AD1981B with built-in stereo speakers		A45-S121
A45-S130	15.0	Intel Celeron 2800		2.80	Intel 852GME @ 32 MB		40 GB (4200 RPM) HDD		Analog Devices AD1981B with built-in stereo speakers		A45-S130
A45-S150	15.0	Intel Mobile Pentium 4		2.40	Intel 852GME @ 32 MB		60 GB (4200 RPM) HDD		Analog Devices AD1981B with built-in stereo speakers		A45-S150
A45-S151	15.0	Intel Mobile Pentium 4		2.80	Intel 852GME @ 32 MB		60 GB (4200 RPM) HDD		Analog Devices AD1981B with built-in stereo speakers		A45-S151
A45-S250	15.0	Intel Mobile Pentium 4		2.80	Intel 852GME @ 32 MB		60 GB (4200 RPM) HDD		Analog Devices AD1981B with built-in stereo speakers		A45-S250
A45-S1202	15.0	Intel Celeron		2.80	Intel 852GM @ 32 MB		60 GB (4200 RPM) HDD		Analog Devices AD1981B with built-in stereo speakers		A45-S1202
A45-S2502	15.0	Intel Pentium 4 with HT Technology		2.80	Intel 852GME @ 32 MB		60 GB (4200 RPM) HDD		Analog Devices AD1981B with built-in stereo speakers		A45-S2502
A55-S106	15.0	Intel Celeron M 360		1.40	Intel Extreme Graphics 2 @ 16-64 MB (DVMA)		60 GB (4200 RPM) HDD		Software Sound with built-in stereo speakers and Sound Volume Control Dial		A55-S106
A55-S306	15.0	Intel Pentium M 715 with Centrino Mobile Technology		1.50	Intel 855GM @ 32 MB		40 GB (4200 RPM) HDD		STAC9750TG with built-in stereo speakers		A55-S306
A55-S326	15.0	Intel Pentium M 725 with Centrino Mobile Technology		1.60	Intel 855GM @ 32 MB		60 GB (4200 RPM) HDD		STAC9750TG with built-in stereo speakers		A55-S326
A55-S1063WM	15.0	Intel Celeron M 370		1.50	Intel Extreme Graphics 2 @ 16-64 MB		40 GB (5400 RPM) HDD		Built-in stereo speakers with SRS Labs audio enhancements and Sound Volume Control Dial		A55-S1063WM
A55-S1064	15.0	Intel Celeron M 380		1.60	Intel Graphics Media Accelerator 900 @ 8-128 MB		40 GB (5400 RPM) HDD		Built-in stereo speakers with Sound Volume Control Dial		A55-S1064
A55-S1065	15.0	Intel Celeron M 360		1.40	Intel Extreme Graphics 2 @ 16-64 MB		80 GB (5400 RPM) HDD		Built-in stereo speakers with SRS Labs audio enhancements and Sound Volume Control Dial		A55-S1065
A55-S1066	15.0	Intel Celeron M 370		1.50	Intel Extreme Graphics 2 @ 16-64 MB		40 GB (5400 RPM) HDD		Built-in stereo speakers with SRS Labs audio enhancements and Sound Volume Control Dial		A55-S1066
A55-S3062	15.0	Intel Celeron M 340		1.50	Intel 852GM @ 32 MB		40 GB (4200 RPM) HDD		STAC9750TG with built-in stereo speakers		A55-S3062
A55-S3063	15.0	Intel Pentium M 715 with Centrino Mobile Technology		1.50	Intel 855GM @ 32 MB		80 GB (4200 RPM) HDD		STAC9750TG with built-in stereo speakers		A55-S3063
A60-S156	15.0	Intel Celeron		2.80	ATI Mobility Radeon 7000 IGP @ 64 MB		40 GB (4200 RPM) HDD		Realtek ALC250 with built-in stereo speakers		A60-S156
A60-S159	15.0	Intel Celeron D 335		2.80	ATI Mobility Radeon 7000 IGP @ 64 MB		60 GB (4200 RPM) HDD		Realtek ALC250 with built-in stereo speakers and Sound Volume Control Dial		A60-S159
A60-S166	15.0	Intel Pentium 4 with HT Technology		2.80	ATI Mobility Radeon 7000 IGP @ 64 MB		40 GB (4200 RPM) HDD		Realtek ALC250 with built-in stereo speakers		A60-S166
A60-S1173	15.0	Intel Pentium 4 532 with HT Technology		3.06	ATI Mobility Radeon 7000 IGP @ 64 MB		40 GB (4200 RPM) HDD		Realtek ALC250 with built-in stereo speakers		A60-S1173
A60-S1591ST; A60-S1592ST	15.0	Intel Celeron D 330		2.66	ATI Mobility Radeon 7000 IGP @ 64 MB		30 GB (4200 RPM) HDD		Realtek ALC250 with built-in stereo speakers and Sound Volume Control Dial		A60-S1592ST
A60-S1662	15.0	Intel Celeron D 325		2.53	ATI Mobility Radeon 7000 IGP @ 64 MB		30 GB (4200 RPM) HDD		Realtek ALC250 with built-in stereo speakers		A60-S1662
A65-S126	15.0	Intel Celeron		2.80	ATI Mobility Radeon 7000 IGP @ 64 MB		60 GB (4200 RPM) HDD		Realtek ALC250 with built-in stereo speakers		A65-S126
A65-S1062	15.0	Intel Celeron		2.70	ATI Mobility Radeon 7000 IGP @ 64 MB		40 GB (4200 RPM) HDD		Realtek ALC250 with built-in stereo speakers		A65-S1062
A65-S1063	15.0	Intel Celeron D 325		2.53	ATI Mobility Radeon 7000 IGP @ 64 MB		30 GB (4200 RPM) HDD		Realtek ALC250 with built-in stereo speakers		A65-S1063
A65-S1064	15.0	Intel Mobile Pentium 4 518 with HT Technology		2.80	ATI Mobility Radeon 7000 IGP @ 64 MB		40 GB (4200 RPM) HDD		Realtek ALC250 with built-in stereo speakers		A65-S1064
A65-S1065	15.0	Intel Mobile Pentium 4 518 with HT Technology		2.80	ATI Mobility Radeon 7000 IGP @ 64 MB		60 GB (4200 RPM) HDD		Realtek ALC250 with built-in stereo speakers		A65-S1065
A65-S1066	15.0	Intel Mobile Pentium 4 518 with HT Technology		2.80	ATI Mobility Radeon 7000 IGP @ 64 MB		60 GB (4200 RPM) HDD		Realtek ALC250 with built-in stereo speakers		A65-S1066
A65-S1067	15.0	Intel Mobile Pentium 4 518 with HT Technology		2.80	ATI Mobility Radeon 7000 IGP @ 64 MB		40 GB (4200 RPM) HDD		Realtek ALC250 with built-in stereo speakers		A65-S1067
A65-S1068	15.0	Intel Mobile Pentium 4 518 with HT Technology		2.80	ATI Mobility Radeon 7000 IGP @ 64 MB		60 GB (4200 RPM) HDD		Realtek ALC250 with built-in stereo speakers		A65-S1068
A65-S1069	15.0	Intel Mobile Pentium 4 518 with HT Technology		3.33	ATI Mobility Radeon 7000 IGP @ 64 MB		60 GB (4200 RPM) HDD		Realtek ALC250 with built-in stereo speakers		A65-S1069
A65-S1070	15.0	Intel Mobile Pentium 4 518 with HT Technology		3.06	ATI Mobility Radeon 7000 IGP @ 64 MB		40 GB (4200 RPM) HDD		Realtek ALC250 with built-in stereo speakers		A65-S1070
A65-S1362	15.0	Intel Celeron D 325		2.53	ATI Mobility Radeon 7000 IGP @ 64 MB		30 GB (4200 RPM) HDD		Realtek ALC250 with built-in stereo speakers		A65-S1362
A65-S1762	15.0	Intel Mobile Pentium 4 538 with HT Technology		3.20	ATI Mobility Radeon 7000 IGP @ 64 MB		60 GB (4200 RPM) HDD		Realtek ALC250 with built-in stereo speakers		A65-S1762
A70-S249; A70-S259	15.0	Intel Mobile Pentium 4 532 or 538		3.06–3.20	ATI Mobility Radeon 9000 @ 64 MB		60 GB (4200 RPM) HDD		Realtek ALC259 with Sound Volume Control Dial, built-in stereo speakers and microphone		A70-S249
A70-S256	15.0	Intel Mobile Pentium 4 532 with HT Technology		3.06	ATI Mobility Radeon 9000 @ 64 MB		60 GB (4200 RPM) HDD		Realtek ALC250 with built-in stereo speakers		A70-S256
A75-S125	15.0	Intel Mobile Pentium 4 538 with HT Technology		3.20	ATI Mobility Radeon 9000 @ 64 MB		40 GB (4200 RPM) HDD		Realtek ALC250 with built-in stereo speakers and Sound Volume Control Dial		A75-S125
A75-S206	15.0	Intel Mobile Pentium 4 518 with HT Technology		2.80	ATI Mobility Radeon 9000 @ 64 MB		60 GB (4200 RPM) HDD		Realtek ALC250 with built-in stereo speakers		A75-S206
A75-S211; A75-S231	15.0	Intel Mobile Pentium 4 538 or 548 with HT Technology		3.20–3.33	ATI Mobility Radeon 9000 @ 64 MB		80 GB (4200 RPM) HDD		Realtek ALC250 with built-in stereo speakers and Sound Volume Control Dial		A75-S211
A75-S213	15.0	Intel Mobile Pentium 4 548 with HT Technology		3.33	ATI Mobilty Radeon 9000 IGP @ 128 MB		100 GB (5400 RPM) HDD		Realtek ALC250 with built-in stereo speakers and Sound Volume Control Dial		A75-S213
A75-S226	15.0	Intel Mobile Pentium 4 532 with HT Technology		3.06	ATI Mobility Radeon 9000 @ 64 MB		60 GB (4200 RPM) HDD		Realtek ALC250 with built-in stereo speakers		A75-S226
A75-S276	15.0	Intel Mobile Pentium 4 538 with HT Technology		3.20	ATI Mobility Radeon 9000 @ 64 MB		80 GB (4200 RPM) HDD		Realtek ALC250 with built-in stereo speakers		A75-S276
A75-S2112	15.0	Intel Mobile Pentium 4 532 with HT Technology		3.06	ATI Mobility Radeon 9000 @ 64 MB		60 GB (4200 RPM) HDD		Realtek ALC250 with built-in stereo speakers and Sound Volume Control Dial		A75-S2112
A75-S2762	15.0	Intel Mobile Pentium 4 538 with HT Technology		3.20	ATI Mobility Radeon 9000 @ 64 MB		80 GB (4200 RPM) HDD		Realtek ALC250 with built-in stereo speakers		A75-S2762
A80-S178TD	15.0	Intel Celeron M 370		1.50	ATI Mobility Radeon 9000 @ 64 MB	256 MB @ 333 MHz DDR SDRAM (max. 2048 MB)	40 GB (5400 RPM) HDD		Realtek ALC250 with built-in stereo speakers and Sound Volume Control Dial		A80-S178TD
A85-S107	15.0	Intel Celeron M 360J		1.40	ATI Mobility Radeon 9000 @ 64 MB	256 MB @ 333 MHz DDR SDRAM (max. 1280 MB)	40 GB (5400 RPM) HDD		Realtek ALC250 with built-in stereo speakers and Sound Volume Control Dial		A85-S107
A85-S1072	15.0	Intel Celeron M 360J		1.40	ATI Mobility Radeon 9000 @ 64 MB	256 MB @ 333 MHz DDR SDRAM (max. 1280 MB)	40 GB (5400 RPM) HDD		Realtek ALC250 with built-in stereo speakers and Sound Volume Control Dial		A85-S1072
A100-ST3211	15.4	Intel Pentium M 740		1.73	Intel Graphics Media Accelerator 900 @ 8-128 MB	256 MB @ 333 MHz DDR2 SDRAM (max. 2048 MB)	40 GB (5400 RPM) HDD		Realtek 861 with built-in stereo speakers, SRS Labs Audio Enhancements, Intel HD Audio and Sound Volume Control Dial		A100-ST3211
A105-S2712	15.4	Intel Pentium M 740		1.73	Intel Graphics Media Accelerator 900 @ 8-128 MB		60 GB (5400 RPM) SATA HDD		Realtek 861 with built-in stereo speakers, SRS Labs Audio Enhancements, Intel HD Audio and Sound Volume Control Dial		A105-S2712
A105-S2716	15.4	Intel Pentium M 740		1.73	Intel Graphics Media Accelerator 900 @ 8-128 MB		100 GB (5400 RPM) SATA HDD		Realtek 861 with built-in stereo speakers, SRS Labs Audio Enhancements, Intel HD Audio and Sound Volume Control Dial		A105-S2716
A105-S2719	15.4	Intel Pentium M 750		1.86	Intel Graphics Media Accelerator 900 @ 8-128 MB		100 GB (5400 RPM) SATA HDD		Realtek 861 with built-in stereo speakers, SRS Labs Audio Enhancements, Intel HD Audio and Sound Volume Control Dial		A105-S2719
A105-S271	15.4	Intel Pentium M 750		1.86	Intel Graphics Media Accelerator 900 @ 8-128 MB		100 GB (5400 RPM) SATA HDD		Realtek 861 with built-in stereo speakers, SRS Labs Audio Enhancements, Intel HD Audio and Sound Volume Control Dial		A105-S271
A105-S361	15.4	Intel Pentium M 760		2.00	Intel Graphics Media Accelerator 900 @ 8-128 MB		120 GB (5400 RPM) SATA HDD		Realtek 861 with built-in stereo speakers, SRS Labs Audio Enhancements, Intel HD Audio and Sound Volume Control Dial		A105-S361
A135-SP5820	15.4	Intel Core Duo T2350		1.86	Intel Graphics Media Accelerator 950 @ 8-256 MB	1024 MB PC2-5300 DDR2 SDRAM (max 4096 MB)	120 GB (5400 RPM) SATA HDD		Built-in stereo speakers with Sound Volume Control Dial		A135-SP5820
A205-S5000	15.4	Intel Celeron 540		1.86	Mobile Intel Graphics Media Accelerator X3100 @ 8-256 MB	2048 MB PC5300 DDR2 SDRAM (max 2048 MB)	120 GB (5400 RPM) SATA HDD		Built-in stereo speakers with Sound Volume Control Dial		A205-S5000
A205-S5800	15.4	Intel Celeron 540		1.86	Mobile Intel Graphics Media Accelerator X3100 @ 128-251 MB	1024 MB PC5300 DDR2 SDRAM (max 2048 MB)	120 GB (5400 RPM) SATA HDD		Built-in stereo speakers with Sound Volume Control Dial		A205-S5800
A205-S5801	15.4	Intel Pentium Dual-Core T2330		1.60	Mobile Intel Graphics Media Accelerator X3100 @ 128-251 MB	1024 MB PC5300 DDR2 SDRAM (max 2048 MB)	120 GB (5400 RPM) SATA HDD		Built-in stereo speakers with Sound Volume Control Dial		A205-S5801
A205-S5803	15.4	Intel Pentium Dual-Core T2330		1.60	Mobile Intel Graphics Media Accelerator X3100 @ 128-251 MB	1024 MB PC5300 DDR2 SDRAM (max 2048 MB)	120 GB (5400 RPM) SATA HDD		Built-in stereo speakers with Sound Volume Control Dial		A205-S5803
A205-S5804	15.4	Intel Pentium Dual-Core T2330		1.60	Mobile Intel Graphics Media Accelerator X3100 @ 128-251 MB	1024 MB PC5300 DDR2 SDRAM (max 2048 MB)	120 GB (5400 RPM) SATA HDD		Built-in stereo speakers with Sound Volume Control Dial		A205-S5804
A205-S5805	15.4	Intel Celeron 540		1.86	Mobile Intel Graphics Media Accelerator X3100 @ 128-251 MB	1024 MB PC5300 DDR2 SDRAM (max 2048 MB)	80 GB (5400 RPM) SATA HDD		Built-in stereo speakers with Sound Volume Control Dial		A205-S5805
A205-S5806	15.4	Intel Pentium Dual-Core T2370		1.73	Mobile Intel Graphics Media Accelerator X3100 @ 128-251 MB		120 GB (5400 RPM) SATA HDD		Built-in stereo speakers with Sound Volume Control Dial		A205-S5806
A205-S5809	15.4	Intel Pentium Dual-Core T2330		1.60	Mobile Intel Graphics Media Accelerator X3100 @ 128-251 MB		120 GB (5400 RPM) SATA HDD		Built-in stereo speakers with Sound Volume Control Dial		A205-S5809
A205-S5810	15.4	Intel Pentium Dual-Core T2330		1.60	Mobile Intel Graphics Media Accelerator X3100 @ 128-251 MB		120 GB (5400 RPM) SATA HDD		Built-in stereo speakers with Sound Volume Control Dial		A205-S5810
A205-S5811	15.4	Intel Pentium Dual-Core T2370		1.73	Mobile Intel Graphics Media Accelerator X3100 @ 128-251 MB		160 GB (5400 RPM) SATA HDD		Built-in stereo speakers with Sound Volume Control Dial		A205-S5811
A205-S5812	15.4	Intel Pentium Dual-Core T2330		1.60	Mobile Intel Graphics Media Accelerator X3100 @ 128-358 MB				Built-in stereo speakers with Sound Volume Control Dial		A205-S5812
A205-S5813	15.4	Intel Pentium Dual-Core T2330		1.60	Mobile Intel Graphics Media Accelerator X3100 @ 128-358 MB				Built-in stereo speakers with Sound Volume Control Dial		A205-S5813
A205-S5814	15.4	Intel Pentium Dual-Core T2330		1.60	Mobile Intel Graphics Media Accelerator X3100 @ 128-358 MB				Built-in stereo speakers with Sound Volume Control Dial		A205-S5814
A205-S5816	15.4	Intel Pentium Dual-Core T2330		1.60	Mobile Intel Graphics Media Accelerator X3100 @ 128-251 MB				Built-in stereo speakers with Sound Volume Control Dial		A205-S5816
A205-S5819	15.4	Intel Pentium Dual-Core T2330		1.60	Mobile Intel Graphics Media Accelerator X3100 @ 128-358 MB				Built-in stereo speakers with Sound Volume Control Dial		A205-S5819
A205-S5821	15.4	Intel Pentium Dual-Core T2330		1.60	Mobile Intel Graphics Media Accelerator X3100 @ 128-251 MB				Built-in stereo speakers with Sound Volume Control Dial		A205-S5821
A205-S5823	15.4	Intel Pentium Dual-Core T2330		1.60	Mobile Intel Graphics Media Accelerator X3100 @ 128-358 MB				Built-in stereo speakers with Sound Volume Control Dial		A205-S5823
A205-S5825	15.4	Intel Pentium Dual-Core T2370	Mobile Intel GL960 Express	1.73	Mobile Intel Graphics Media Accelerator X3100 @ 8-256 MB				Built-in stereo speakers with Sound Volume Control Dial		A205-S5825
A205-S5831	15.4	Intel Pentium Dual-Core T2370	Mobile Intel GL960 Express	1.73	Mobile Intel Graphics Media Accelerator X3100 @ 8-256 MB				Built-in stereo speakers with Sound Volume Control Dial		A205-S5831
A205-S5833	15.4	Intel Pentium Dual-Core T2370	Mobile Intel GL960 Express	1.73	Mobile Intel Graphics Media Accelerator X3100 @ 8-256 MB				Built-in stereo speakers with Sound Volume Control Dial		A205-S5833
A205-S5835	15.4	Intel Pentium Dual-Core T2370	Mobile Intel GL960 Express	1.73	Mobile Intel Graphics Media Accelerator X3100 @ 8-256 MB				Built-in stereo speakers with Sound Volume Control Dial		A205-S5835
A205-S5841	15.4	Intel Pentium Dual-Core T2370	Mobile Intel GL960 Express	1.73	Mobile Intel Graphics Media Accelerator X3100 @ 8-256 MB				Built-in stereo speakers with Sound Volume Control Dial		A205-S5841
A205-S5843	15.4	Intel Pentium Dual-Core T2370	Mobile Intel GL960 Express	1.73	Mobile Intel Graphics Media Accelerator X3100 @ 8-256 MB				Built-in stereo speakers with Sound Volume Control Dial		A205-S5843
A205-S5847	15.4	Intel Pentium Dual-Core T2370	Mobile Intel GL960 Express	1.73	Mobile Intel Graphics Media Accelerator X3100 @ 8-256 MB				Built-in stereo speakers with Sound Volume Control Dial		A205-S5847
A205-S5851	15.4	Intel Pentium Dual-Core T2370	Mobile Intel GL960 Express	1.73	Mobile Intel Graphics Media Accelerator X3100 @ 8-256 MB				Built-in stereo speakers and microphone with Sound Volume Control Dial		A205-S5851
A205-S5852	15.4	Intel Pentium Dual-Core T2370	Mobile Intel GL960 Express	1.73	Mobile Intel Graphics Media Accelerator X3100 @ 8-256 MB				Built-in stereo speakers and microphone with Sound Volume Control Dial		A205-S5852
A205-S5853	15.4	Intel Core 2 Duo T5550	Mobile Intel GM965 Express	1.83	Mobile Intel Graphics Media Accelerator X3100 @ 8-256 MB				Built-in stereo speakers and microphone with Sound Volume Control Dial		A205-S5853
A205-S5855	15.4	Intel Core 2 Duo T5550		1.83	Mobile Intel Graphics Media Accelerator X3100 @ 8-256 MB				Built-in stereo speakers and microphone with Sound Volume Control Dial		A205-S5855
A205-S5859	15.4	Intel Core 2 Duo T5550		1.83	Mobile Intel Graphics Media Accelerator X3100 @ 8-256 MB				Built-in stereo speakers and microphone with Sound Volume Control Dial		A205-S5859
A205-S5861	15.4	Intel Core 2 Duo T5550		1.83	Mobile Intel Graphics Media Accelerator X3100 @ 8-256 MB				Built-in stereo speakers and microphone with Sound Volume Control Dial		A205-S5861
A205-S5863	15.4	Intel Core 2 Duo T5550		1.83	Mobile Intel Graphics Media Accelerator X3100 @ 8-256 MB				Built-in stereo speakers and microphone with Sound Volume Control Dial		A205-S5863
A205-S5864	15.4	Intel Core 2 Duo T5550		1.83	Mobile Intel Graphics Media Accelerator X3100 @ 8-256 MB				Built-in stereo speakers and microphone with Sound Volume Control Dial		A205-S5864
A205-S5866	15.4	Intel Pentium Dual-Core T2390		1.86	Mobile Intel Graphics Media Accelerator X3100 @ 8-256 MB				Built-in stereo speakers with Sound Volume Control Dial		A205-S5866
A205-S5867	15.4	Intel Pentium Dual-Core T2390		1.86	Mobile Intel Graphics Media Accelerator X3100 @ 8-256 MB				Built-in stereo speakers with Sound Volume Control Dial		A205-S5867
A205-S5871	15.4	Intel Pentium Dual-Core T2390		1.86	Mobile Intel Graphics Media Accelerator X3100 @ 8-256 MB				Built-in stereo speakers with Sound Volume Control Dial		A205-S5871
A205-S5872	15.4	Intel Pentium Dual-Core T2390		1.86	Mobile Intel Graphics Media Accelerator X3100 @ 8-256 MB				Built-in stereo speakers with Sound Volume Control Dial		A205-S5872
A205-S5878	15.4	Intel Pentium Dual-Core T2390		1.86	Mobile Intel Graphics Media Accelerator X3100 @ 8-256 MB				Built-in stereo speakers with Sound Volume Control Dial		A205-S5878
A205-S5879	15.4	Intel Pentium Dual-Core T2390		1.86	Mobile Intel Graphics Media Accelerator X3100 @ 8-256 MB				Built-in stereo speakers with Sound Volume Control Dial		A205-S5879
A205-S5880	15.4	Intel Pentium Dual-Core T2390		1.86	Mobile Intel Graphics Media Accelerator X3100 @ 8-256 MB				Built-in stereo speakers with Sound Volume Control Dial		A205-S5880
A205-S6808	15.4	Intel Core 2 Duo T5450		1.66	Mobile Intel Graphics Media Accelerator X3100 @ 128-358 MB				Built-in stereo speakers with Sound Volume Control Dial		A205-S6808
A205-S6810	15.4	Intel Core 2 Duo T5450		1.66	Mobile Intel Graphics Media Accelerator X3100 @ 128-358 MB				Built-in stereo speakers with Sound Volume Control Dial		A205-S6810
A205-S6812	15.4	Intel Core 2 Duo T5450		1.66	Mobile Intel Graphics Media Accelerator X3100 @ 128-358 MB				Built-in stereo speakers with Sound Volume Control Dial		A205-S6812
A205-SP5815	15.4	Intel Celeron 540		1.86	Mobile Intel Graphics Media Accelerator X3100 @ 128-251 MB				Built-in stereo speakers with Sound Volume Control Dial		A205-SP5815
A205-SP5817	15.4	Intel Pentium Dual-Core T2370		1.73	Mobile Intel Graphics Media Accelerator X3100 @ 8-256 MB				Built-in stereo speakers with Sound Volume Control Dial		A205-SP5817
A205-SP5820	15.4	Intel Pentium Dual-Core T2390		1.86	Mobile Intel Graphics Media Accelerator X3100 @ 8-256 MB				Built-in stereo speakers with Sound Volume Control Dial		A205-SP5820
A205-SP5821	15.4	Intel Pentium Dual-Core T2410		2.00	Mobile Intel Graphics Media Accelerator X3100 @ 8-256 MB				Built-in stereo speakers with Sound Volume Control Dial		A205-SP5821
A205-SP5822	15.4	Intel Pentium Dual-Core T2390		1.86	Mobile Intel Graphics Media Accelerator X3100 @ 8-256 MB				Built-in stereo speakers with Sound Volume Control Dial		A205-SP5822
A210-ST1616	15.4	AMD Athlon 64 X2 Dual-Core TK-55 with HyperTransport Technology	AMD M690V	1.80	ATI Radeon X1200 @ 128-319 MB		160 GB (5400 RPM) SATA HDD		Built-in stereo speakers with Sound Volume Control Dial		A210-ST1616
A215-S4697	15.4	AMD Turion 64 X2 Dual-Core TL52	AMD M690V		ATI Radeon X1200 @ 128-319 MB	1024 MB DDR2 SDRAM (max 4096 MB)	160 GB (5400 RPM) SATA HDD		Built-in stereo speakers with Sound Volume Control Dial		A215-S4697
A215-S4717	15.4	AMD Turion 64 X2 Dual-Core TL56	AMD M690V		ATI Radeon X1200 @ 128-319 MB	1024 MB DDR2 SDRAM (max 4096 MB)	160 GB (5400 RPM) SATA HDD		Built-in stereo speakers with Sound Volume Control Dial		A215-S4717
A215-S4737	15.4	AMD Turion 64 X2 Dual-Core TL56	AMD M690V		ATI Radeon X1200 @ 128-319 MB	1024 MB DDR2 SDRAM (max 4096 MB)	200 GB SATA HDD				A215-S4737
A215-S4747	15.4	AMD Turion 64 X2 Dual-Core TL56	AMD M690V		ATI Radeon X1200 @ 128-319 MB	1024 MB DDR2 SDRAM (max 4096 MB)	200 GB SATA HDD				A215-S4747
A215-S4757	15.4	AMD Turion 64 X2 Dual-Core TL56	AMD M690V		ATI Radeon X1200 @ 128-319 MB		250 GB (4200 RPM) SATA HDD				A215-S4757
A215-S4767	15.4	AMD Turion 64 X2 Dual Core Mobile Gold Edition TL64	AMD M690V		ATI Radeon X1200 @ 128-319 MB						A215-S4767
A215-S4807	15.4	AMD Turion 64 X2 Dual-Core Mobile TL56	AMD M690V		ATI Radeon X1200 @ 128-319 MB						A215-S4807
A215-S48171	15.4	AMD Turion 64 X2 Dual-Core Mobile TL58	AMD M690V		ATI Radeon X1200 @ 128-319 MB						A215-S48171
A215-S4817	15.4	AMD Turion 64 X2 Dual-Core Mobile TL58	AMD M690V		ATI Radeon X1200 @ 128-319 MB						A215-S4817
A215-S5802	15.4	AMD Athlon 64 X2 Dual-Core TK-57	AMD M690V	1.90	ATI Radeon X1200 @ 128-319 MB						A215-S5802
A215-S5807	15.4	AMD Athlon 64 X2 Dual-Core TK-57	AMD M690V	1.90	ATI Radeon X1200 @ 128-319 MB						A215-S5807
A215-S5808	15.4	AMD Athlon 64 X2 Dual-Core TK-55	AMD M690V	1.80	ATI Radeon X1200 @ 128-319 MB						A215-S5808
A215-S5815	15.4	AMD Turion 64 X2 Dual-Core Mobile TL-60	AMD M690V	2.00	ATI Radeon X1200 @ 128-319 MB						A215-S5815
A215-S5817	15.4	AMD Athlon 64 X2 Dual-Core TK-57	AMD M690V	1.90	ATI Radeon X1200 @ 128-319 MB						A215-S5817
A215-S5818	15.4	AMD Turion 64 X2 Dual-Core Mobile TL-60	AMD M690V	2.00	ATI Radeon X1200 @ 128-319 MB						A215-S5818
A215-S5822	15.4	AMD Turion 64 X2 Dual-Core Mobile TL-60	AMD M690V	2.00	ATI Radeon X1200 @ 128-319 MB						A215-S5822
A215-S5824	15.4	AMD Athlon 64 X2 Dual-Core TK-57	AMD M690V	1.90	ATI Radeon X1200 @ 128-319 MB						A215-S5824
A215-S5825	15.4	AMD Athlon 64 X2 Dual-Core TK-55	AMD M690V	1.80	ATI Radeon X1200 @ 128-319 MB						A215-S5825
A215-S5829	15.4	AMD Athlon 64 X2 Dual-Core TK-57	AMD M690V	1.90	ATI Radeon X1200 @ 128-319 MB						A215-S5829
A215-S5837	15.4	AMD Turion 64		2.00							A215-S5837
A215-S5839	15.4	AMD Athlon 64 X2		1.90							A215-S5839
A215-S5848	15.4	AMD Turion 64		2.00							A215-S5848
A215-S5849	15.4	AMD Turion 64		2.00							A215-S5849
A215-S5850	15.4	AMD Turion 64		2.00							A215-S5850
A215-S5857	15.4	AMD Turion 64		2.10							A215-S5857
A215-S6804	15.4	AMD Turion 64		2.00							A215-S6804
A215-S6814	15.4	AMD Turion 64		2.20							A215-S6814
A215-S6816	15.4	AMD Turion 64		2.20							A215-S6816
A215-S6820	15.4	AMD Turion 64		2.20							A215-S6820
A215-S7407	15.4	AMD Athlon 64 X2		1.80							A215-S7407
A215-S7408	15.4	AMD Athlon 64 X2		1.80							A215-S7408
A215-S7411	15.4	AMD Athlon 64 X2		1.70							A215-S7411
A215-S7413	15.4	AMD Athlon 64 X2		1.70							A215-S7413
A215-S7414	15.4	AMD Athlon 64 X2		1.80							A215-S7414
A215-S7416	15.4	AMD Athlon 64 X2		1.70							A215-S7416
A215-S7417	15.4	AMD Athlon 64 X2		1.80							A215-S7417
A215-S7422	15.4	AMD Turion 64		1.90							A215-S7422
A215-S7425	15.4	AMD Athlon 64 X2		1.70							A215-S7425
A215-S7427	15.4	AMD Athlon 64 X2		1.80							A215-S7427
A215-S7428	15.4	AMD Athlon 64 X2		1.80							A215-S7428
A215-S7433	15.4	AMD Athlon 64 X2		1.80							A215-S7433
A215-S7437	15.4	AMD Turion 64		1.90							A215-S7437
A215-S7444	15.4	AMD Turion 64		1.90							A215-S7444
A215-S7447	15.4	AMD Turion 64		2.00							A215-S7447
A215-S7462	15.4	AMD Turion 64		2.00							A215-S7462
A215-S7472	15.4	AMD Turion 64		2.20							A215-S7472
A215-SP5810	15.4	AMD Athlon 64 X2		1.90							A215-SP5810
A215-SP5811	15.4	AMD Athlon 64 X2		1.90							A215-SP5811
A215-SP5816	15.4	AMD Athlon 64 X2		1.90							A215-SP5816
A300-ST3511	15.4	Intel Pentium T3400	Mobile Intel GL40 Express	2.16	Intel Graphics Media Accelerator 4500M						A300-ST3511
A300-ST3512	15.4	Intel Core 2 Duo P7450	Mobile Intel GM45 Express	2.13	Mobile Intel Graphics Media Accelerator 4500MHD @ 128-1294 MB						A300-ST3512
A300-ST4004	15.4	Intel Pentium Dual-Core T2390	Mobile Intel GM965 Express	1.86–2.50	Intel Graphics Media Accelerator X3100					Windows Vista Home Basic	A300-ST4004
A300-ST4505	15.4	Intel Core 2 Duo T5800	Mobile Intel GM45 Express	2.00	Intel Graphics Media Accelerator 4500MHD						A300-ST4505
A300-ST6511	15.4	Intel Pentium T3400	Mobile Intel GM45 Express	2.16	Intel Graphics Media Accelerator 4500MHD						A300-ST6511
A305D-S6831	15.4	AMD Turion 64 X2 Dual-Core Gold Edition TL-64 with HyperTransport Technology	AMD M690G	2.20	ATI RadeonTM X1250 @ 128-831 MB						A305D-S6831
A305D-S6835	15.4	AMD Turion 64 X2 Dual-Core Gold Edition TL-64 with HyperTransport Technology	AMD M690G	2.20	ATI RadeonTM X1250 @ 128-831 MB						A305D-S6835
A305D-S6848	15.4	AMD Turion 64 X2 Dual-Core TL-60 with HyperTransport Technology	AMD M690G	2.00	ATI RadeonTM X1250 @ 128-831 MB						A305D-S6848
A305D-S68491	15.4	AMD Turion 64 X2 Dual-Core RM-70 with HyperTransport Technology	AMD M780V	2.00	ATI Radeon 3100 @ 256-1406 MB						A305D-S68491
A305D-S6849	15.4	AMD Turion 64 X2 Dual-Core RM-70 with HyperTransport Technology	AMD M780V	2.00	ATI Radeon 3100 @ 256-1406 MB						A305D-S6849
A305D-S6851	15.4	AMD Turion 64 X2 Dual-Core RM-70 with HyperTransport Technology	AMD M780V	2.00	ATI Radeon 3100 @ 256-1406 MB						A305D-S6851
A305D-S6856	15.4	AMD Turion 64 X2 Dual-Core RM-70 with HyperTransport Technology	AMD M780V	2.00	ATI Radeon 3100 @ 256-1406 MB						A305D-S6856
A305D-S6865	15.4	AMD Turion 64 X2 Dual-Core TL-60 with HyperTransport Technology	AMD M690G	2.00	ATI Radeon X1250 @ 128-831 MB						A305D-S6865
A305D-S6886	15.4	AMD Turion 64 X2 Dual-Core RM-72 with HyperTransport 3 Technology	AMD M780V	2.10	ATI Radeon HD 3470 Hybrid X2 with 256 MB DDR						A305D-S6886
A305D-S6914	15.4	AMD Turion X2 Ultra Dual-Core Mobile ZM-82	AMD M780V	2.20	ATI Mobility Radeon HD 3650 with 512 MB DDR						A305D-S6914
A305D-S6991E	15.4	AMD Turion 64 X2 Dual-Core Mobile TL-60	AMD M690G	2.00	ATI Radeon X1250 @ 128-831 MB						A305D-S6991E
A305D-SP6801	15.4	AMD Turion 64 X2 Dual-Core Mobile TL-62	AMD M690G	2.10							A305D-SP6801
A305D-SP6802	15.4	AMD Turion 64 X2	AMD M780V	2.00							A305D-SP6802
A305D-SP6803	15.4	AMD Turion 64 X2	AMD M780V	2.10							A305D-SP6803
A305D-SP6905	15.4	AMD Turion 64 X2	AMD M780V	2.10							A305D-SP6905
A305D-SP6925	15.4	AMD Turion 64 X2 Dual-Core Mobile RM-72	AMD M780V	2.10							A305D-SP6925
A305-S6825	15.4	Intel Core 2 Duo T5550	Mobile Intel GM965 Express	1.83	Mobile Intel Graphics Media Accelerator X3100 with 128-358 MB						A305-S6825
A305-S6829	15.4	Intel Core 2 Duo T5550	Mobile Intel GM965 Express	1.83	Mobile Intel Graphics Media Accelerator X3100 with 128-358 MB						A305-S6829
A305-S6833	15.4	Intel Core 2 Duo T5750	Mobile Intel GM965 Express	2.00	Mobile Intel Graphics Media Accelerator X3100 with 128-358 MB						A305-S6833
A305-S6834	15.4	Intel Core 2 Duo T5550	Mobile Intel GM965 Express	1.83	Mobile Intel Graphics Media Accelerator X3100 with 128-358 MB						A305-S6834
A305-S6837	15.4	Intel Core 2 Duo T5550	Mobile Intel GM965 Express	1.83	Mobile Intel Graphics Media Accelerator X3100 with 128-358 MB						A305-S6837
A305-S6839	15.4	Intel Core 2 Duo T8100	Mobile Intel PM965 Express	2.10							A305-S6839
A305-S6841	15.4	Intel Core 2 Duo T5550	Mobile Intel PM965 Express	1.83							A305-S6841
A305-S6843	15.4	Intel Core 2 Duo T8100	Mobile Intel PM965 Express	2.10							A305-S6843
A305-S6844	15.4	Intel Core 2 Duo T8100	Mobile Intel PM965 Express	2.10							A305-S6844
A305-S6845	15.4	Intel Core 2 Duo T8100	Mobile Intel PM965 Express	2.10							A305-S6845
A305-S6852	15.4	Intel Core 2 Duo T5750	Mobile Intel GM965 Express	2.00							A305-S6852
A305-S68531	15.4	Intel Core 2 Duo T5750	Mobile Intel GM965 Express	2.00							A305-S68531
A305-S6853	15.4	Intel Core 2 Duo T5750	Mobile Intel GM965 Express	2.00							A305-S6853
A305-S6854	15.4	Intel Core 2 Duo T5750	Mobile Intel GM965 Express	2.00							A305-S6854
A305-S6855	15.4	Intel Core 2 Duo T5750	Mobile Intel GM965 Express	2.00							A305-S6855
A305-S6857	15.4	Intel Core 2 Duo T5750	Mobile Intel GM965 Express	2.00							A305-S6857
A305-S6858	15.4	Intel Core 2 Duo T5750	Mobile Intel GM965 Express	2.00							A305-S6858
A305-S6859	15.4	Intel Core 2 Duo T5750	Mobile Intel GM965 Express	2.00							A305-S6859
A305-S6860	15.4	Intel Core 2 Duo T5750		2.00							A305-S6860
A305-S6861	15.4	Intel Core 2 Duo T5750		2.00							A305-S6861
A305-S6862	15.4	Intel Core 2 Duo T5750		2.00							A305-S6862
A305-S6863	15.4	Intel Core 2 Duo P7350		2.00							A305-S6863
A305-S68641	15.4	Intel Core 2 Duo P8400		2.26							A305-S68641
A305-S6864	15.4	Intel Core 2 Duo P8400		2.26							A305-S6864
A305-S6872	15.4	Intel Core 2 Duo T5800		2.00							A305-S6872
A305-S6883	15.4	Intel Core 2 Duo T5800		2.00							A305-S6883
A305-S6894	15.4	Intel Core 2 Duo P7350		2.00							A305-S6894
A305-S6898	15.4	Intel Core 2 Duo T5800		2.00							A305-S6898
A305-S6902	15.4	Intel Pentium T4200		2.00							A305-S6902
A305-S6905	15.4	Intel Core 2 Duo		2.00							A305-S6905
A305-S6908	15.4	Intel Core 2 Duo		2.00							A305-S6908
A305-S6909	15.4	Intel Pentium T4200		2.00							A305-S6909
A305-S6916	15.4	Intel Core 2 Duo		2.00							A305-S6916
A305-S6992E	15.4	Intel Core 2 Duo		2.00							A305-S6992E
A305-S6994E	15.4	Intel Core 2 Duo		2.00							A305-S6994E
A305-S6996E	15.4	Intel Core 2 Duo		2.00							A305-S6996E
A305-S6997E	15.4	Intel Core 2 Duo		2.40							A305-S6997E
A305-SP6803	15.4	Intel Core 2 Duo		2.00							A305-SP6803
A305-SP6804	15.4	Intel Core 2 Duo		2.00							A305-SP6804
A305-SP6906	15.4	Intel Core 2 Duo		2.20							A305-SP6906
A305-SP6923	15.4	Intel Pentium T3400		2.16							A305-SP6923
A305-SP6926	15.4	Intel Core 2 Duo T6400		2.00							A305-SP6926
A305-SP6931	15.4	Intel Core 2 Duo T6400		2.00							A305-SP6931
A305-ST551E	15.4	Intel Core 2 Duo T5900		2.20							A305-ST551E
A350-ST3601	16.0 (1366x768)	Intel Core 2 Duo T6400		2.00							A350-ST3601
A355D-S6885	16.0	AMD Turion 64 X2 Dual-Core RM-72 with HyperTransport 3	AMD M780V	2.10	ATI Radeon 3100 @ 256-1470 MB		500 GB using two 5400 RPM SATA HDD		Built-in harman/kardon stereo speakers with microphone and sound volume control dial		A355D-S6885
A355D-S6887	16.0	AMD Turion X2 Ultra Dual-Core ZM-80 with HyperTransport 3	AMD M770V	2.10	ATI Radeon HD 3470 Hybrid X2				Built-in harman/kardon stereo speakers with microphone and sound volume control dial		A355D-S6887
A355D-S6889	16.0	AMD Turion 64 X2 Dual-Core RM-72 with HyperTransport 3	AMD M780V	2.10	ATI Radeon 3100 @ 256-1919 MB				Built-in harman/kardon stereo speakers with microphone and sound volume control dial		A355D-S6889
A355D-S6921	16.0	AMD Turion 64 X2 Dual-Core RM-70 with HyperTransport 3	AMD M780V	2.00	ATI Radeon 3100 @ 256-1470 MB				Built-in harman/kardon stereo speakers with microphone and sound volume control dial		A355D-S6921
A355D-S69221	16.0	AMD Turion 64 X2 Dual-Core RM-72 with HyperTransport 3	AMD M780V	2.10	ATI Radeon 3100 @ 256-1919 MB				Built-in harman/kardon stereo speakers with microphone and sound volume control dial		A355D-S69221
A355D-S6922	16.0	AMD Turion 64 X2 Dual-Core RM-72 with HyperTransport 3	AMD M780V	2.10	ATI Radeon 3100 @ 256-1919 MB				Built-in harman/kardon stereo speakers with microphone and sound volume control dial		A355D-S6922
A355D-S69301	16.0	AMD Turion X2 Ultra Dual-Core ZM-80	AMD M780V	2.10	ATI Radeon HD 3470 Hybrid X2 with 256 MB DDR				Built-in harman/kardon stereo speakers with microphone and sound volume control dial		A355D-S69301
A355D-S6930	16.0	AMD Turion X2 Ultra Dual-Core ZM-80	AMD M780V	2.10	ATI Radeon HD 3470 Hybrid X2 with 256 MB DDR				Built-in harman/kardon stereo speakers with microphone and sound volume control dial		A355D-S6930
A355-S6879	16.0	Intel Core 2 Duo T5800	Mobile Intel GM45 Express	2.00	Intel Graphics Media Accelerator 4500MHD @ 128-1340 MB				Built-in harman/kardon stereo speakers with microphone and sound volume control dial		A355-S6879
A355-S6924	16.0	Intel Core 2 Duo T6600	Mobile Intel GM45 Express	2.20	Intel Graphics Media Accelerator 4500MHD @ 128-1759 MB				Built-in harman/kardon stereo speakers with microphone and sound volume control dial		A355-S6924
A355-S69251	16.0	Intel Core 2 Duo T6400	Mobile Intel GM45 Express	2.00	Intel Graphics Media Accelerator 4500MHD @ 128-1340 MB				Built-in harman/kardon stereo speakers with microphone and sound volume control dial		A355-S69251
A355-S6925	16.0	Intel Core 2 Duo T6400	Mobile Intel GM45 Express	2.00	Intel Graphics Media Accelerator 4500MHD @ 128-1759 MB				Built-in harman/kardon stereo speakers with microphone and sound volume control dial		A355-S6925
A355-S6926	16.0	Intel Core 2 Duo T6400	Mobile Intel GM45 Express	2.00	Intel Graphics Media Accelerator 4500MHD @ 128-1340 MB				Built-in harman/kardon stereo speakers with microphone and sound volume control dial		A355-S6926
A355-S6931	16.0	Intel Core 2 Duo P7450	Mobile Intel GM45 Express	2.13	Intel Graphics Media Accelerator 4500MHD @ 128-1759 MB				Built-in harman/kardon stereo speakers with microphone and sound volume control dial		A355-S6931
A355-S6935	16.0	Intel Core 2 Duo T6400	Mobile Intel GM45 Express	2.00	ATI Mobility Radeon HD 3650 with 512 MB DDR				Built-in harman/kardon stereo speakers with microphone and sound volume control dial		A355-S6935
A355-S69403	16.0	Intel Core 2 Duo P8600	Mobile Intel GM45 Express	2.40	Intel Graphics Media Accelerator 4500MHD @ 128-1759 MB				Built-in harman/kardon stereo speakers with microphone and sound volume control dial		A355-S69403
A355-S6940	16.0	Intel Core 2 Duo P8600	Mobile Intel GM45 Express	2.40	Intel Graphics Media Accelerator 4500MHD @ 128-1759 MB				Built-in harman/kardon stereo speakers with microphone and sound volume control dial		A355-S6940
A355-S6943	16.0	Intel Core 2 Duo P7450	Mobile Intel GM45 Express	2.13	ATI Mobility Radeon HD 3650 with 512 MB DDR				Built-in harman/kardon stereo speakers with microphone and sound volume control dial		A355-S6943
A355-S6998E	16.0	Intel Core 2 Duo P7350	Mobile Intel GM45 Express	2.00	ATI Mobility Radeon HD 3470 with 256 MB DDR				Built-in harman/kardon stereo speakers with microphone and sound volume control dial		A355-S6998E
A355-SP7927	16.0	Intel Core 2 Duo P7450		2.13	ATI Mobility Radeon HD 3650 with 512 MB DDR				Built-in harman/kardon stereo speakers with microphone and sound volume control dial		A355-SP7927
A355-ST661E	16.0	Intel Core 2 Duo T5900		2.20	Intel Graphics Media Accelerator 4500MHD @ 128-1759 MB				Built-in harman/kardon stereo speakers with microphone and sound volume control dial		A355-ST661E
A500-ST5601	16.0	Intel Core 2 Duo T6500		2.10	Intel Graphics Media Accelerator 4500MHD @ 128-1759 MB				Built-in harman/kardon stereo speakers and microphone		A500-ST5601
A500-ST5602	16.0	Intel Core 2 Duo T6500		2.10	ATI Mobility Radeon HD 4570 with 512 MB DDR3				Built-in harman/kardon stereo speakers and microphone		A500-ST5602
A500-ST5605	16.0	Intel Core 2 Duo T6600		2.20	Intel Graphics Media Accelerator 4500MHD @ 128-1759 MB				Built-in harman/kardon stereo speakers		A500-ST5605
A500-ST5606	16.0	Intel Core 2 Duo P8700		2.53	Intel Graphics Media Accelerator 4500MHD @ 128-1759 MB				Built-in harman/kardon stereo speakers		A500-ST5606
A500-ST5607	16.0	Intel Core i5-430M		2.26	Intel Graphics Media Accelerator HD				Built-in harman/kardon stereo speakers with Dolby Sound Room		A500-ST5607
A500-ST5608	16.0	Intel Core i7-720QM		1.60	NVIDIA GeForce 310M with 512 MB GDDR3				Built-in harman/kardon stereo speakers with Dolby Sound Room		A500-ST5608
A500-ST56EX	16.0	Intel Core 2 Duo P7350		2.00	NVIDIA GeForce 310M with 512 MB GDDR3				Built-in harman/kardon stereo speakers		A500-ST56EX
A500-ST56X3	16.0	Intel Core 2 Duo P7450		2.13	Intel Graphics Media Accelerator 4500MHD				Built-in harman/kardon stereo speakers		A500-ST56X3
A500-ST56X4	16.0	Intel Core 2 Duo P7450		2.13	NVIDIA GeForce GT 230Mwith 1 GB DDR3				Built-in harman/kardon stereo speakers		A500-ST56X4
A500-ST56X6	16.0	Intel Core i7-720QM		1.60	NVIDIA GeForce 310M with 512 MB GDDR3		500 GB (7200 RPM) Serial ATA HDD		Built-in harman/kardon stereo speakers		A500-ST56X6
A500-ST56X7	16.0	Intel Core i5-430M with Turbo Boost Technology		2.26	Mobile Intel Graphics Media Accelerator HD @ 32-1696 MB		500 GB (5400 RPM) Serial ATA HDD		Built-in harman/kardon stereo speakers with Dolby Sound Room		A500-ST56X7
A500-ST6621	16.0	Intel Pentium T4200		2.0–2.80	Mobile Intel Graphics Media Accelerator 4500MHD				Built-in harman/kardon stereo speakers and microphone		A500-ST6621
A500-ST6622	16.0	Intel Pentium T4300		2.1–2.80	Mobile Intel Graphics Media Accelerator 4500MHD				Built-in harman/kardon stereo speakers and microphone		A500-ST6622
A500-ST6644	16.0	Intel Core i3-330M		2.13–2.40	Mobile Intel Graphics Media Accelerator HD @ 32-1243 MB				Built-in harman/kardon stereo speakers with Dolby Sound Room		A500-ST6644
A500-ST6647	16.0	Intel Core i7-720QM		1.60	NVIDIA GeForce 310M with 512 MB GDDR3				Built-in harman/kardon stereo speakers with Dolby Sound Room		A500-ST6647
A505D-S6008	16.0	AMD Turion II Ultra Dual-Core M620	AMD M880G	2.50	ATI Radeon HD 4200 with 256-1918 MB				Built-in harman/kardon stereo speakers with Dolby Sound Room		A505D-S6008
A505D-S6958	16.0	AMD Turion 64 X2 Dual-Core Mobile RM-72	AMD M780V	2.10	ATI Radeon HD 3100 with 256-1918 MB				Built-in harman/kardon stereo speakers		A505D-S6958
A505D-S6968	16.0	AMD Turion X2 Ultra Dual-Core ZM-84	AMD M780G	2.30	ATI Radeon HD 3200 with 256-1918 MB						A505D-S6968
A505D-S6987	16.0	AMD Turion II Ultra Dual-Core M600		2.40	ATI Radeon HD 4200 with 256-1918 MB						A505D-S6987
A505D-SP6989	16.0	AMD Turion 64 X2 Dual-Core RM-74	AMD M780V	2.20	ATI Radeon HD 3100						A505D-SP6989
A505-S6005	16.0	Intel Core i3-330M	Mobile Intel HM55 Express	2.13	Intel Graphics Media Accelerator HD with 32-1696 MB						A505-S6005
A505-S6007	16.0	Intel Core i3-330M	Mobile Intel HM55 Express	2.13	Intel Graphics Media Accelerator HD with 32-1696 MB						A505-S6007
A505-S6009	16.0	Intel Core i3-330M	Mobile Intel HM55 Express	2.13	NVIDIA GeForce 310M with 512 MB GDDR3						A505-S6009
A505-S6030	16.0	Intel Core i7-720QM	Mobile Intel HM55 Express	1.60	NVIDIA GeForce 310M with 512 MB GDDR3						A505-S6030
A505-S6960	16.0	Intel Core 2 Duo T6500	Mobile Intel GM45 Express	2.10	Intel Graphics Media Accelerator 4500MHD						A505-S6960
A505-S6965	16.0	Intel Core 2 Duo P7350	Mobile Intel GM45 Express	2.00	ATI Mobility Radeon HD 4570						A505-S6965
A505-S6966	16.0	Intel Core 2 Duo P7350	Mobile Intel GM45 Express	2.00	Intel Graphics Media Accelerator 4500MHD @ 128-1759 MB						A505-S6966
A505-S6967	16.0	Intel Core 2 Duo T6500	Mobile Intel GM45 Express	2.10	Intel Graphics Media Accelerator 4500MHD @ 128-1759 MB						A505-S6967
A505-S6969	16.0	Intel Core 2 Duo T6500	Mobile Intel GM45 Express	2.10	ATI Mobility Radeon HD 4650 with 1 GB DDR3						A505-S6969
A505-S6970	16.0	Intel Core 2 Duo T6500	Mobile Intel GM45 Express	2.10	ATI Mobility Radeon HD 4570 with 512 MB DDR3						A505-S6970
A505-S6971	16.0	Intel Core 2 Duo T6500	Mobile Intel GM45 Express	2.10	ATI Mobility Radeon HD 4570 with 512 MB DDR3						A505-S6971
A505-S6972	16.0	Intel Core 2 Duo T6500	Mobile Intel GM45 Express	2.10	ATI Mobility Radeon HD 4570 with 512 MB DDR3						A505-S6972
A505-S6973	16.0	Intel Core 2 Duo T6500	Mobile Intel GM45 Express	2.10	ATI Mobility Radeon HD 4650 with 1 GB DDR3						A505-S6973
A505-S6975	16.0	Intel Core 2 Duo T6500	Mobile Intel GM45 Express	2.00	ATI Mobility Radeon HD 4570 with 512 MB DDR3						A505-S6975
A505-S6976	16.0	Intel Core 2 Duo P7350	Mobile Intel GM45 Express	2.00	ATI Mobility Radeon HD 4570 with 512 MB DDR3						A505-S6976
A505-S6979	16.0	Intel Core 2 Duo P8700	Mobile Intel GM45 Express	2.53	ATI Mobility Radeon HD 4650 with 1 GB DDR3						A505-S6979
A505-S6981	16.0	Intel Core 2 Duo T6600	Mobile Intel GM45 Express	2.20	Intel Graphics Media Accelerator 4500MHD						A505-S6981
A505-S6982	16.0	Intel Core 2 Duo T6600	Mobile Intel GM45 Express	2.20	Intel Graphics Media Accelerator 4500MHD						A505-S6982
A505-S6983	16.0	Intel Core 2 Duo P7450	Mobile Intel GM45 Express	2.13	Intel Graphics Media Accelerator 4500MHD with 128-1759 MB						A505-S6983
A505-S6984	16.0	Intel Core 2 Duo T6600	Mobile Intel GM45 Express	2.20	Intel Graphics Media Accelerator 4500MHD						A505-S6984
A505-S6985	16.0	Intel Core 2 Duo T6600	Mobile Intel GM45 Express	2.20	NVIDIA GeForce GT 230M with 1 GB GDDR3						A505-S6985
A505-S6986	16.0	Intel Core 2 Duo T6600	Mobile Intel GM45 Express	2.20	NVIDIA GeForce GT 230M with 1 GB GDDR3						A505-S6986
A505-S6989	16.0	Intel Core 2 Duo P7450	Mobile Intel GM45 Express	2.13	NVIDIA GeForce GT 230M with 1 GB GDDR3						A505-S6989
A505-S6990	16.0	Intel Core 2 Duo T6600	Mobile Intel GM45 Express	2.20	Intel Graphics Media Accelerator 4500MHD with 128-1759 MB						A505-S6990
A505-S6991	16.0	Intel Core 2 Duo T6600	Mobile Intel GM45 Express	2.20	Intel Graphics Media Accelerator 4500MHD						A505-S6991
A505-S6992	16.0	Intel Core 2 Duo P7450	Mobile Intel GM45 Express	2.13	NVIDIA GeForce GT 230M with 1 GB GDDR3						A505-S6992
A505-S6995	16.0	Intel Core 2 Duo P7450	Mobile Intel GM45 Express	2.13	NVIDIA GeForce GT 230M with 1 GB GDDR3						A505-S6995
A505-S6996	16.0	Intel Core 2 Duo P7450	Mobile Intel GM45 Express	2.13	NVIDIA GeForce GT 230M with 1 GB GDDR3						A505-S6996
A505-S6997	16.0	Intel Core 2 Duo P7450	Mobile Intel GM45 Express	2.13	NVIDIA GeForce GT 230M with 1 GB GDDR3						A505-S6997
A505-S6998	16.0	Intel Core 2 Duo T9600	Mobile Intel GM45 Express	2.80	NVIDIA GeForce GT 230M with 1 GB GDDR3						A505-S6998
A505-S6999	16.0	Intel Core 2 Duo P7450	Mobile Intel GM45 Express	2.13	NVIDIA GeForce GT 230M with 1 GB GDDR3						A505-S6999
A505-SP6021	16.0	Intel Core i3-330M	Mobile Intel HM55 Express	2.13	NVIDIA GeForce 310M with 512 MB GDDR3						A505-SP6021
A505-SP6022	16.0	Intel Core i5-430M	Mobile Intel HM55 Express	2.26	Intel Graphics Media Accelerator HD with 32-1696 MB						A505-SP6022
A505-SP6023	16.0	Intel Core i3-330M	Mobile Intel HM55 Express	2.13	Intel Graphics Media Accelerator HD with 32-1696 MB						A505-SP6023
A505-SP6986	16.0	Intel Core 2 Duo T6500	Mobile Intel GM45 Express	2.10	Intel Graphics Media Accelerator 4500MHD with 128-1759 MB						A505-SP6986
A505-SP6988	16.0	Intel Core 2 Duo P7350	Mobile Intel GM45 Express	2.00	ATI Mobility Radeon HD 4570 with 512 MB DDR3						A505-SP6988
A505-SP6996	16.0	Intel Core 2 Duo T6500	Mobile Intel GM45 Express	2.10	Intel Graphics Media Accelerator 4500MHD						A505-SP6996
A660-BT2G22	16.0	Intel Core i7-740QM		1.73 (2.93 with Turbo Boost)	NVIDIA GeForce GT 330M with 1 GB GDDR3						A660-BT2G22
A660-BT2N22	16.0	Intel Core i3-350M		2.26	Mobile Intel HD Graphics with 64-763 MB						A660-BT2N22
A660-BT3G25X	16.0	Intel Core i7-2630QM		2.00 (2.90 with Turbo Boost)	NVIDIA GeForce GT 540M with NVIDIA Optimus Technology featuring 1 GB GDDR3						A660-BT3G25X
A660D-BT2N22	16.0	AMD Phenom II Triple Core Mobile P820	AMD M880G	1.8	ATI Mobility Radeon HD 4250						A660D-BT2N22
A660D-BT2N23	16.0	AMD Phenom II Triple Core Mobile N850	AMD M880G	1.7 or 2.2	ATI Mobility Radeon HD 4250						A660D-BT2N23
A660D-ST2G01	16.0	AMD Phenom II Quad-Core Mobile P920	AMD M880G	1.60	ATI Mobility Radeon HD 5650 with 1 GB DDR3						A660D-ST2G01
A660D-ST2G02	16.0	AMD Phenom II Quad-Core Mobile P940	AMD M880G	1.70	ATI Mobility Radeon HD 5650 with 1 GB DDR3						A660D-ST2G02
A660D-ST2NX2	16.0	AMD Phenom II Triple-Core Mobile P820	AMD M880G	1.80	ATI Mobility Radeon HD 4250						A660D-ST2NX2
A660-ST2N01	16.0	Intel Core i5-450M	Mobile Intel HM55 Express	2.40	Mobile Intel HD Graphics @ 64 – 1696 MB						A660-ST2N01
A660-ST2N02	16.0	Intel Core i5-460M	Mobile Intel HM55 Express	2.53	Mobile Intel HD Graphics @ 64 – 1696 MB						A660-ST2N02
A660-ST3N01X	16.0	Intel Core i5-2410M	Mobile Intel HM65 Express	2.30	Mobile Intel HD Graphics @ 64 – 1696 MB						A660-ST3N01X
A660-ST5N01	16.0	Intel Pentium P6200	Mobile Intel HM55 Express	2.13	Mobile Intel HD Graphics @ 64 – 1696 MB						A660-ST5N01
A665-3DV10X	15.6	Intel Core i5-2410M	Mobile Intel HM65 Express	2.30	NVIDIA GeForce GT 540M with 1 GB GDDR3						A665-3DV10X
A665-3DV12X	15.6	Intel Core i7-2630QM	Mobile Intel HM65 Express	2.00	NVIDIA GeForce GT 540M with 1 GB GDDR3						A665-3DV12X
A665-3DV5	15.6	Intel Core i5-460M with Turbo Boost Technology	Mobile Intel HM55 Express	2.53	NVIDIA GeForce GTS 350M with 1 GB GDDR3						A665-3DV5
A665-3DV6	15.6	Intel Core i5-460M with Turbo Boost Technology	Mobile Intel HM55 Express	2.53	NVIDIA GeForce GTS 350M with 1 GB GDDR3						A665-3DV6
A665-3DV7	15.6	Intel Core i5-460M with Turbo Boost Technology	Mobile Intel HM55 Express	2.53	NVIDIA GeForce GTS 350M with 1 GB GDDR3						A665-3DV7
A665-3DV8	15.6	Intel Core i7-740QM	Mobile Intel HM55 Express	1.73 (2.93 with Turbo Boost)	NVIDIA GeForce GTS 350M with 1 GB GDDR3						A665-3DV8
A665D-S5174	16.0	AMD Phenom II Dual-Core Mobile N660	AMD M880G	3.00	ATI Mobility Radeon HD 5650 with 1 GB DDR3						A665D-S5174
A665D-S5175	16.0	AMD Phenom II Quad-Core Mobile P960	AMD M880G	1.80	ATI Mobility Radeon HD 4250 Graphics with 256-1917 MB						A665D-S5175
A665D-S5178	16.0	AMD Phenom II Quad-Core Mobile P960	AMD M880G	1.80	ATI Mobility Radeon HD 4250 Graphics with 256-1917 MB						A665D-S5178
A665D-S6051	16.0	AMD Phenom II Quad-Core Mobile P920	AMD M880G	1.60	ATI Mobility Radeon HD 4250 Graphics with 256-1917 MB						A665D-S6051
A665D-S6059	16.0	AMD Phenom II Quad-Core Mobile P920	AMD M880G	1.60	ATI Mobility Radeon HD 5650 with 1 GB DDR3						A665D-S6059
A665D-S6075	16.0	AMD Phenom II Triple-Core Mobile N850	AMD M880G	2.20	ATI Mobility Radeon HD 4250 Graphics with 256-1917 MB						A665D-S6075
A665D-S6076	16.0	AMD Phenom II Triple-Core Mobile N850	AMD M880G	2.20	ATI Mobility Radeon HD 4250 Graphics with 256-1917 MB						A665D-S6076
A665D-S6082	16.0	AMD Phenom II Triple-Core Mobile N850	AMD M880G	2.20	ATI Mobility Radeon HD 5650 with 1 GB DDR3						A665D-S6082
A665D-S6083	16.0	AMD Phenom II Triple-Core Mobile N850	AMD M880G	2.20	ATI Mobility Radeon HD 5650 with 1 GB DDR3						A665D-S6083
A665D-S6084	16.0	AMD Phenom II Quad-Core Mobile P940	AMD M880G	1.70	ATI Mobility Radeon HD 4250 Graphics with 256-1917 MB						A665D-S6084
A665D-S6091	16.0	AMD Phenom II Quad-Core Mobile P940	AMD M880G	1.70	ATI Mobility Radeon HD 5650 with 1 GB DDR3						A665D-S6091
A665D-S6096	16.0	AMD Phenom II Quad-Core Mobile P940	AMD M880G	1.70	ATI Mobility Radeon HD 4250 Graphics with 256-1917 MB						A665D-S6096
A665-S5170	15.6	Intel Core i3-380M	Mobile Intel HM55 Express	2.53	Mobile Intel HD Graphics with 64-1696 MB						A665-S5170
A665-S5171	15.6	Intel Core i3-380M	Mobile Intel HM55 Express	2.53	Mobile Intel HD Graphics with 64-1696 MB						A665-S5171
A665-S5173	15.6	Intel Core i5-480M	Mobile Intel HM55 Express	2.66 (2.93 with Turbo Boost)	Mobile Intel HD Graphics with 64-1696 MB						A665-S5173
A665-S5176X	15.6	Intel Core i3-2310M	Mobile Intel HM65 Express	2.10	Mobile Intel HD Graphics with 64-1696 MB						A665-S5176X
A665-S5177X	15.6	Intel Core i5-2410M	Mobile Intel HM65 Express	2.30 (2.90 with Turbo Boost)	Mobile Intel HD Graphics with 64-1696 MB						A665-S5177X
A665-S5179	15.6	Intel Core i5-480M	Mobile Intel HM55 Express	2.66 (2.93 with Turbo Boost)	Mobile Intel HD Graphics with 64-1696 MB						A665-S5179
A665-S5182X	15.6	Intel Core i7-2630QM with Turbo Boost Technology		2.00							A665-S5182X
A665-S5183X	15.6	Intel Core i7-2630QM with Turbo Boost Technology		2.00							A665-S5183X
A665-S5184X	15.6	Intel Core i7-2630QM with Turbo Boost Technology		2.00							A665-S5184X
A665-S5185	15.6	Intel Core i7-2630QM with Turbo Boost Technology		2.00							A665-S5185
A665-S5186	15.6	Intel Core i5-480M		2.66							A665-S5186
A665-S5187X	15.6	Intel Core i7-2630QM with Turbo Boost Technology		2.00							A665-S5187X
A665-S6054	16.0	Intel Core i5-450M		2.40							A665-S6054
A665-S6080	16.0	Intel Core i3-370M		2.40							A665-S6080
A665-S6087	16.0	Intel Core i5-460M		2.53							A665-S6087
A665-S6094	16.0	Intel Core i7-740QM		1.73							A665-S6094
A665-S6100X	16.0	Intel Core i7-2630QM with Turbo Boost Technology		2.00							A665-S6100X
A665-SP5131L	15.6	Intel Core i7-2630QM with Turbo Boost Technology		2.00	NVIDIA GeForce GT 540M with NVIDIA Optimus Technology						A665-SP5131L
A665-SP5161M	15.6	Intel Core i7-2630QM with Turbo Boost Technology		2.00	NVIDIA GeForce GT 540M with NVIDIA Optimus Technology						A665-SP5161M
A665-SP6010	16.0	Intel Core i5-460M with Turbo Boost Technology		2.53	Intel HD Graphics						A665-SP6010
A665-SP6011	16.0	Intel Core i5-460M with Turbo Boost Technology		2.53	NVIDIA GeForce GT 330M with Optimus Technology						A665-SP6011
A665-SP6012	15.6	Intel Core i7-740QM with Turbo Boost Technology		1.73	NVIDIA GeForce GTS 350M						A665-SP6012
A665-SP6013	16.0	Intel Core i7-740QM with Turbo Boost Technology		1.73	NVIDIA GeForce GT 330M @ 1 GB GDDR3						A665-SP6013
