= NZR A class =

NZR A class may refer to:

- NZR A class (1873); 14 tank locomotives
- NZR A class (1906); 57 tender locomotives
