= A' (Afrirampo album) =

Studio album by Afrirampo
- Released: December 2004
- Genres: Experimental rock, psychedelic rock
- Label: Acid Mothers Temple
- Producer: Afrirampo

A' is a Japanese-language pop album by Osaka-based band Afrirampo, released in 2004 of Acid Mothers Temple's label, containing previously self-released tracks and alternate versions of tracks which originally appeared on the bands A release. The tracks were produced by Kawabata Makoto and digitally remastered by Yoshida Tatsuya of Ruins.

The album was released as an Enhanced CD containing a video of live performance clips and a band photo, and was limited to 1000 copies.

== Track listing ==
No.	Title	Length
1.	"Afrirampo" (あふりらんぽのおとをきけ)	0:43
2.	"Dodododo" (ドドドド)	3:28
3.	"Oni Pika Heart" (オニピカハート)	2:11
4.	"I Love You" (愛してる)	8:37
5.	"I Can't Let You Go Home" (あかんここままかえさない)	2:47
6.	"Father Mother" (父母)	1:14
7.	"Afrirampo" (あふりらんぽ)	3:18
8.	"女 (Kunoichi)" (雪景色)	16:14

== Personnel ==
- Oni – vocal, guitar
- Pikacyu – vocal, drums

=== Technical personnel ===
- Produced by Afrirampo
- Executive produced by Kawabata Makoto
