= Class A =

Class A may refer to:

== Communications technology ==
- Class-A amplifier, a category of electronic amplifier
- Class A network, in Internet technology, a type of large network
- Class A television service, a system for regulating low power stations in the United States

== Sports ==
- Class A (baseball), a level of American Minor League Baseball
- Class A (classification), a Paralympic wheelchair fencing classification

== Transportation ==
- Class A airfield, a type of World War II British military installation
- Class A surface, in automotive design
- Class A, a type of commercial driver's license in the United States
- Class A, an ICAO airspace class
- Class A, a type of motorhome

== Other uses ==
- Class A (novel), a 2004 CHERUB novel by Robert Muchamore
- Class A drug, a classification of drugs controlled by the UK Misuse of Drugs Act
- Class A office space, a Building Owners and Managers Association category
- Class A share, a class of stock shares
- Class A, a stellar classification
- Class A, a retired type of United States Army Service Uniform
- Class A foams, a type of foam used in firefighting

== See also ==
- A class (disambiguation)
- Class B (disambiguation)
