= Production (album) =

Studio album by Mirwais Ahmadzaï
- Released: 20 April 2000
- Recorded: 1999–2000
- Studio: Sarm West (London); The Exchange (London); Studio 2+B (Paris); Studio 2 (Courbevoie)
- Genre: Electro; house; electronica
- Length: 43:04
- Label: Naïve; Epic
- Producer: Mirwais Ahmadzaï

Mirwais Ahmadzaï chronology
Mirwais (1990)	Production (2000)	Retrofuture (2021)

Singles from Production
- 1. "Disco Science" Released: 1999; 2. "Naïve Song" Released: 2000; 3. "I Can't Wait" Released: 2001; 4. "Miss You" Released: 2002

Production is the second studio album by French record producer and songwriter Mirwais, released on 20 April 2000 through Naïve in Europe.

== Background ==
Mastering was done at The Exchange, London, by Simon Davey, except "Disco Science", mastered by Nilesh Patel.

== Release and promotion ==
=== Music videos ===
Several music videos were released for Production. "Disco Science" was directed by French artist and photographer Stéphane Sednaoui in 1999 and released the same year.

The second video, for "Naïve Song", was directed by the photographer Jean-Baptiste Mondino during 2000.

Stéphane Sednaoui directed another video for "I Can't Wait", which was released as the third single.

=== Mirwais Remixed ===
In 2008, Naive Records released Mirwais Remixed, a remix album which came included the original album, with all singles remixed by different artists. Remixers include Giorgio Moroder, Joey Negro, Dave Clarke, Shakedown, Thin White Duke, Les Rythmes Digitales and Olav Basoski.

The song "Disco Science" was used during a hare coursing scene in the film Snatch.

== Critical reception ==
According to Metacritic, the album received "generally favorable reviews" with a score of 73/100, based on 11 reviews. NME reviewed the album positively, calling it "the sound of an old punk playing catch-up with dance music." Rob Sheffield, writing for Rolling Stone, concluded "Cerebral, meticulous and frivolous, Production is a disco-science celebration of pop trash that most electronica gurus would be too spiritually elevated to deliver. Mirwais' knack for song puts him in another league altogether." The A.V. Club was not as positive, stating "What could have been a huge breakthrough instead sounds staid, as if he were so used to rocking the house that he didn't want to risk rocking the boat."

== Track listing ==
Credits adapted from the liner notes of Production.

Production — Standard edition
No.	Title	Writer(s)	Length
1.	"Disco Science"	Mirwais Ahmadzaï; Kim Deal	3:34
2.	"Naïve Song"	Ahmadzaï	4:23
3.	"V.I. (The Last Words She Said Before Leaving)"	Ahmadzaï; Serge Gainsbourg	6:51
4.	"I Can't Wait"	Ahmadzaï	3:15
5.	"Junkie's Prayer"	Ahmadzaï	3:50
6.	"Definitive Beat"	Ahmadzaï	3:30
7.	"Paradise (Not for Me)"	Ahmadzaï; Madonna	6:27
8.	"Never Young Again"	Ahmadzaï	5:37
9.	"Involution"	Ahmadzaï	5:37
Total length:			43:04

Production — 2-LP Vinyl
No.	Title	Writer(s)	Length
10.	"Disco Science" (Giorgio Moroder's Blueprint Mix)	Ahmadzaï; Deal	6:57
Total length:			50:01

Production — 2-CD deluxe edition / CD+DVD limited edition / Digital reissue / Deluxe version (digital)
No.	Title	Writer(s)	Length
10.	"Miss You"	Ahmadzaï; Mick Jagger; Keith Richards	3:35
Total length:			46:39

Production — 2-CD deluxe edition (disc 1)
No.	Title	Director(s)	Length
11.	"Disco Science" (music video)	Stéphane Sednaoui	3:33
Total length:			50:12

Production — 2-CD deluxe edition (disc 2: Mirwais Remixed) / Deluxe version (digital)
No.	Title	Writer(s)	Length
1.	"I Can't Wait" (Shakedown Remix)	Ahmadzaï	6:33
2.	"Naïve Song" (Les Rythmes Digitales Remix)	Ahmadzaï	5:49
3.	"Disco Science" (Giorgio Moroder Blue Print Remix)	Ahmadzaï; Deal	6:57
4.	"Miss You" (Thin White Duke Mix)	Ahmadzaï; Jagger; Richards	4:07
5.	"Naïve Song" (Dave Clarke Remix)	Ahmadzaï	5:44
6.	"I Can't Wait" (Mirwais Original Mix)	Ahmadzaï	4:18
7.	"Disco Science" (Joey Negro Club Mix)	Ahmadzaï; Deal	7:13
8.	"Disco Science" (Mirwais Electrobreak Remix)	Ahmadzaï; Deal	8:20
9.	"Naïve Song" (Olav Basoski Remix)	Ahmadzaï	7:04
10.	"Miss You" (Micronauts Remix)	Ahmadzaï; Jagger; Richards	6:34
Total length:			1:02:39

Production — CD+DVD limited edition (bonus DVD)
No.	Title	Director(s)	Length
1.	"Disco Science"	Sednaoui	3:33
2.	"Naïve Song"	Jean-Baptiste Mondino	3:30
3.	"I Can't Wait"	Sednaoui	3:20
4.	"Junkie's Prayer" (explicit images)	Aurore Lagache	3:53
5.	"Miss You"	Christophe Navarre	3:39
Total length:			17:55

Notes

- "Disco Science" contains a sample of "Cannonball" by the Breeders, written by Kim Deal.
- "V.I. (The Last Words She Said Before Leaving)" is an adaptation and a sample of "Cargo Culte", written, composed, and performed by Serge Gainsbourg. Adapted by Mirwais Ahmadzaï.
- "Junkie's Prayer" contains samples from an original soundtrack of the short film Louange (1995) by Jean-Paul Allègre.
- "Miss You" is a cover originally by the Rolling Stones, written by Mick Jagger and Keith Richards. The song also contains a sample of Mirwais' "Disco Science".
- "Paradise (Not for Me)" contains uncredited feature from Madonna. The song later appears on Madonna's eighth studio album Music (2000).
- "Miss You" contains uncredited vocal feature from Craig Wedren.

== Personnel ==
Personnel adapted from the liner notes of Production.

- Mirwais Ahmadzaï – writer, composer, production, programming, mixing, keyboards, guitars, bass, vocals
- Madonna – production, lead vocals (track 7: "Paradise (Not for Me)")
- Craig Wedren – production, lead vocals (track 10: "Miss You")
- Mark "Spike" Stent – vocal recording, mixing (Sarm West Studio, London) (track 7)
- Ian Robertson – recording assistance, mixing assistance (track 7) (Sarm West Studio, London)
- Bruno Mercère – recording strings (track 7) (Sarm West Studio, London)
- Bertrand Joncoux – mixing assistance (tracks 2, 5, 8: "Naïve Song", "Junkie's Prayer", "Never Young Again") (Studio 2, Courbevoie)
- Cyril Morin – strings arrangement, conductor (tracks 7, 8)
- Doubleté – scratches (tracks 6, 8: "Definitive Beat")
- Nilesh Patel – mastering (track 1: "Disco Science")
- Simon Davey – mastering (The Exchange, London)
- Stéphane Sednaoui – photography
- Martin Verdet – artwork
- Philippe Lakits – artwork
