= Music (Madonna album) =

2000 studio album by Madonna

Studio album by Madonna
- Released: September 18, 2000
- Recorded: 1999–2000
- Studios: Sarm West (London); Guerilla Beach (Los Angeles); Hit Factory (New York)
- Genres: Pop; dance-pop; electronica
- Length: 44:40
- Labels: Maverick; Warner Bros.
- Producers: Madonna; Mirwais Ahmadzaï; William Orbit; Guy Sigsworth; Mark "Spike" Stent; Talvin Singh

Madonna chronology
Ray of Light (1998)	Music (2000)	GHV2 (2001)

Singles from Music
- 1. "Music" Released: August 1, 2000; 2. "Don't Tell Me" Released: November 13, 2000; 3. "What It Feels Like for a Girl" Released: April 9, 2001

Music is the eighth studio album by American singer and songwriter Madonna. It was released on September 18, 2000, by Maverick and Warner Bros. Records. Following the success of her previous album Ray of Light (1998), Madonna found herself in a music scene increasingly influenced by a younger generation of singers such as Britney Spears and Christina Aguilera. This led her to seek a distinctive sound that would set her apart in the evolving musical landscape. Her collaborations with Mirwais Ahmadzaï and William Orbit resulted in a more experimental direction for the album. Music incorporates many different genres into its overall dance-pop and electronica vibe, taking influences from funk, house, techno, rock, country, folk and R&B. With the album embracing a western motif, Madonna reimagined her image in the role of a cowgirl.

Music received acclaim from music critics, with many comparing its production to Ray of Light. The album earned a total of five Grammy Award nominations, winning one for Best Recording Package at the 43rd ceremony. The record was a commercial success, selling four million copies in its first ten days of release and topping the album charts in twenty-three countries. In the United States, it topped the Billboard 200 with over 420,000 copies sold first week—her highest to date. It additionally received multi-platinum certifications across the Americas, Europe, and the Asia–Pacific region. As of 2008, Music has sold more than 11 million copies worldwide.

To promote Music, Madonna embarked on a small promotional tour, consisting of televised performances at occasions such as the 2000 MTV Europe Music Awards and the 43rd Grammy Awards, and with two free concerts at Roseland Ballroom and Brixton Academy limited to contest winners. It was also supported by the Drowned World Tour in the following year, her first concert tour after eight years; the tour visited North America and Europe, grossing over US$75 million and making it the highest-grossing tour by a solo act of the year and fourth overall.

Three official singles were released from the album. The title track was the lead single, topping the charts in 25 countries worldwide and becoming Madonna's 12th and, to date, final number-one hit on the US Billboard Hot 100. It was followed by the top-five single "Don't Tell Me" and "What It Feels Like for a Girl", which reached the top 10 in several countries worldwide. "Impressive Instant" was released as a promotional single in the United States, topping the Dance Club Songs chart. "Amazing" was also briefly released as a promotional single in selected countries before being withdrawn shortly afterward. Retrospectively, Music has been recognized by music journalists for anticipating a number of musical trends, such as electro-house, vocal manipulation, lyrical gibberish, chopped-up acoustics, and the adoption of cowboy kitsch.

== Background and development ==
In 1998, Madonna released her seventh studio album Ray of Light to critical and commercial success, winning four Grammy Awards at the 41st edition of the ceremony, including Best Pop Album. Madonna intended to embark on a new concert tour to promote it in 1999, after filming The Next Best Thing; however, the film's production suffered a delay and due to limited time, plans for a tour were eventually canceled. The Next Best Thing was released in March 2000, receiving unfavorable reviews from critics. As part of the film's soundtrack, she recorded a cover version of Don McLean's "American Pie" (1971) at the request of her co-star Rupert Everett, which garnered mixed reactions from critics and the public. However, it became a commercial success worldwide, topping the charts in several countries throughout Europe. The song also became her ninth number-one single in the United Kingdom, extending her record of most chart-topping singles by a female artist in the region. Despite not being released commercially in the United States, it was also a radio success, reaching number 29 on the Billboard Hot 100 chart. The success of "American Pie" increased the public's anticipation for Madonna's next album at the time.

Shortly after releasing "American Pie", Madonna announced she was pregnant with her son Rocco, from her relationship with director Guy Ritchie. Wanting to distract herself from the media frenzy surrounding this news, Madonna concentrated on the development of her eighth studio album, entitled Music. Buoyed by the commercial success of her previous album, she was keen on returning to the studio to record new music. Madonna was well disposed toward producer William Orbit, whom she collaborated with on Ray of Light, but by 2000, his production and sound had become ubiquitous. Moreover, the music industry became increasingly influenced by a new generation of artists such as Britney Spears and Christina Aguilera. At the same time, contemporaries of Madonna's own generation, including Prince, were seeing a decline in their record sales, prompting Madonna to seek a distinctive sound in the music market. She was then introduced to French DJ and producer Mirwais Ahmadzaï. Madonna instantly liked his pitch-shifting, pulverizing rhythms and his use of acid bass in his songs. Ahmadzaï, known for his inclination toward musical innovation, felt inspired to collaborate with Madonna in a way that would achieve her greatest potential.

== Writing and recording ==
Recording sessions for Music began in September 1999 at Sarm West Studios in Notting Hill, London, where she had recently moved, and were almost completed by January 2000. Madonna first began collaborating with Orbit. During his sessions with Madonna, he invited DJ Sasha to work on music for possible inclusion on the album, as they were "looking for a trancey sound". Orbit commented that the material was "a little edgier" and a follow-up "without standing still" to her previous album, and elaborated, "It's almost like we started off with a lot of slow ballad songs and she's started to kind of chuck 'em out in favor of more edgy tracks. The album is getting more kind of fast, very European sounding, very English and French sounding, naturally, 'cause everybody working on it apart from her is English or French. Pretty exciting, actually". After some recording sessions with Orbit, she felt she needed a different sound for her project and scrapped most of the material recorded up to that point. The singer revealed that they had composed nine songs and thought that they were too similar to those of her previous record, prompting her to "throw out everything and start over again." Madonna expressed that she did not want her music to blend in with others, especially since Orbit gained popularity among mainstream artists following their collaboration.

As she sought a new collaborator to start over, Madonna was in search of someone "new and edgy and undiscovered" with a different sound. She was introduced to Ahmadzaï by her manager and partner at Maverick Records, Guy Oseary. He had received a tape with songs from Ahmadzaï's album Production through French photographer Stéphane Sednaoui, and was considering signing him as an artist for the record company. Upon hearing the tape, Madonna believed that his sound was exactly what she was seeking for her next record. Within three weeks, they met at Sarm West to begin work on the album. Madonna had long considered competition between her producers a way to get the best out of them, but Orbit later revealed that he was not at all offended with her change of mind, "as long as she uses good people. And I love what Mirwais has done." Three of his tracks eventually appeared on Music. For his part, Ahmadzaï was relaxed about the offer to work with Madonna, because he knew she was interested in him for his own work, and not for his ability as a performer or for his past work with another artist. The producer felt free to work freely but within her limits, as he thought it was important to respect the artist's work ethic. According to Ahmadzaï, there were no plans at the beginning of the sessions, with Madonna only asking for something more extreme and rough.

During their first days of collaboration, Madonna encountered language barriers with Ahmadzaï due to his limited English proficiency. This frustrated her to the point of wanting to "rip [her] hair out". Consequently, Ahmadzaï's manager stepped in to act as a translator. As time went by, the pair got to know each other better, and the atmosphere in the studio changed into a more relaxed mood. Madonna said she was intent on making their relationship work, because she believed that he was a "genius" and "so incredibly smart and visionary". The first song they worked on was "Impressive Instant", since it was almost complete on the demo that he had sent to Madonna. The singer also wanted to sing "Paradise (Not for Me)", another track present on the demo; however, Ahmadzaï wanted it for his own album, prompting him to make slightly different versions for both records. According to Madonna, the title track was one of the first songs they wrote and produced together and set the tone of the rest of the album. Within the first ten days, they had recorded the backing vocals and acoustic guitars on a Sony 48-track and transferred it to a Logic Audio workstation, using the converters of TC Electronic Finalizer. Feeling that their ideas for the tracks would be difficult to create in Sarm West, Ahmadzaï wanted to return to Paris and work there alone on his own computer. She wanted him to treat her voice differently, and although he did not want any effects on her vocals at first, the producer used the Antares Auto-Tune plug-in set for the pitch correction on some tracks at the singer's request. The audio processor kept the characteristic of Madonna's vocals, and she sang a little out of tune and vibrato. However, other songs such as "I Deserve It" had no effects other than acoustic instrumentation.

Madonna developed an interest in collaborating with Guy Sigsworth as she was drawn by his appreciation for understated technology in music. She reached out to him with the intention of adding an ambient feel to her record. Madonna presented him with the preliminary demo tracks developed for Music, including the songs created with Ahmadzaï. She chose one of two sketches he had sent her, which was almost finished but was still kept unpolished so that Madonna could continue writing on top of it. The backing track contained a sample from the 1993 British film The Cement Garden, with the voice of actress Charlotte Gainsbourg, which later became "What It Feels Like for a Girl". He worked on the track at Sarm West rather than his own studio since he did not want to "fuck up" working with Madonna. The song was finished quickly and within four days they were able to create the final version. From the first day onward, Madonna and Sigsworth chose to retain all the musical noises from the demo; this required the producer to creatively reconfigure her vocals around the segments, utilizing Pro Tools on a SSL 9000 J console. Madonna insisted that Sigsworth give her a rough approximate sound, rather than work on the music for two or three hours. That way, they would know whether it could be kept or rejected and save time on production. During recording, Sigsworth noticed that the verses were out of sync with the music and wanted to add extra bar to help them cohere. However, Madonna dismissed it, and he had to cut up the individual music to put it in his computer to accompany her vocals. Sigsworth thought it made the song sound more "fluid and magical" and commended Madonna for not taking the cop-out solution.

== Composition ==
=== Sound and themes ===
"This record, more than any other records, covers all the areas of my life. I left off partying on Ray of Light. But I'd just had a baby, so my mood was complete, like wonderment of life, and I was incredibly thoughtful and retrospective and intrigued by the mystical aspects of life."

— Madonna discussing the album's themes.

Sonically, Music is predominantly a pop, dance-pop, and electronica album, with influences from a wide array of genres such as funk, house, techno, rock, country, folk, and R&B. It was seen as a continuation of the electronic-oriented work that was present on Ray of Light. Madonna characterized Music as "edgier and a bit funkier" compared to her previous record. She described the composition of Music as "funky, electronic music blended with futuristic folk", complete with "jangly guitars and moody melancholic lines". Shaad D'Souza of Pitchfork viewed the record as "an album designed to unite the disparate tastes of America and Europe, to act as a bridge between teen pop and sophisti-pop, the mainstream and the underground." For Slant Magazine's Sal Cinquemani, Madonna took a "more experimental direction" with the album, whereas David Browne of Entertainment Weekly thought that the folktronica style of Ahmadzaï was the "dominant musical force" on six of the songs.

Thematically, the album can be divided into two categories: partying and love, which Madonna described as the frivolous and non-frivolous sides of her life, respectively. She declared that she usually makes "a record that's one or the other", but felt that she covered both themes at the same time on Music. Madonna wanted the album to embody her desire to dance, contrasting with the introspective tone of Ray of Light. She likened herself to an animal "ready to be sprung from a cage" after leading a quiet and domestic life for years, expressing a longing for performance and being on stage. The singer characterized Music as a record made to bridge the gap between the impersonal experience of living in an era of advanced technology, with the "warmth, compassion, and a sense of humor" of human connection. She perceived the album as a mirror of societal trends, as she felt that society had become "too complacent." For D'Souza, unlike her previous or future records, the album has no concept and relies on spontaneity.

=== Music and lyrics ===
The title track, "Music", is the opening song on the album, and features a disco and funk production. Its production features a dry sound, with heavy usage of equalization, which creates contrast within the vocal track, continuing until the first chorus. The song begins with Madonna's a cappella, slightly lowered and vocodered voice uttering "Hey, Mr. DJ, put a record on; I wanna dance with my baby". The phrase reiterates the uniting power of music. The primary hook, "Music makes the people come together, yeah / Music makes the bourgeoisie and the rebel", was deemed as having political implications, with Madonna apparently renouncing the bourgeoisie. Track two, the "space-age", futuristic-sounding "Impressive Instant", has been described by Billboard's Larry Flick as a "club-savvy stomper" marked by interesting keyboard lines, with Madonna's vocals changing from "distorted, robotic lines" to "playful, childlike chants". Throughout the song, her vocals are often isolated, backed by electronic sounds and an octave bass. A "burbling" synth appears and is followed by a repeated chorus of "I'm in a trance", ending the song with a solo vocal phrase. Lyrically, the track deals with love at first sight; in it, Madonna affirms, "You're the one that I've been waiting for / I don't even know your name". It also references being seduced and losing control of oneself ("And my world is spinning; spinning, baby, out of control") with comparisons to various cosmic and celestial phenomena, in lines such as "Cosmic systems intertwine / Astral bodies drip like wine / All of nature ebbs and flows", but ultimately returns to the subject of dance. "Runaway Lover" features a "hard-stepping techno pulse" while, lyrically, it focuses on Madonna rebuking a man for not being faithful, as exemplified in the chorus, "It doesn't pay to be a runaway lover / It doesn't pay to give away what you lack / You'll never get your money back", or the line "Just like a ship that's lost at sea / You don't care where you drop your anchor / Make sure it doesn't land on me".

The record's fourth track, "I Deserve It", was dedicated to her then-partner and future husband, Guy Ritchie, as shown by the sequence of wordplays with "this guy"; on the track, Madonna states that Ritchie was "made for her", and believes that true love belongs to those who "deserve" it. The song is an acoustic-framed track supported by a folk and hip-hop inflected groove, featuring double-tracked guitar, which Madonna plays herself, and a three-chord sequence, G-C-D (with an F-chord in the chorus). The fifth song, "Amazing", was released as a special single in Mexico only. It opens with a music-box-like combination of keyboards and strings as Madonna tells a tale of love and desire that she cannot get rid of. It transforms into a 1960s-inspired, rock-tinged pop track with a dreamy, soaraway chorus, featuring a rhythm-section 1960s beat topped off with gruff electric guitar arpeggios in stereo. At 2:30, the chorus "It's amazing what a boy can do" is repeated without much instrumentation in the mix before it returns. On the sixth track, "Nobody's Perfect", an apologetic Madonna confesses that maybe she has been unfaithful to someone, but at the same time, she recognizes that "nobody is perfect". She juxtaposes her human emotions with heavily manipulated vocals (using a vocoder) on the song, raising the pitch of her voice slightly and giving an almost robotic quality, with her true voice only being heard saying "Sorry, but," before the chorus begins with "Nobody's perfect". Her normal voice is again heard at the bridge, singing: "Cool, I am, when I am with you / Cool, I'm not, when I am lonely".

"Don't Tell Me"
A 28-sample of "Don't Tell Me", an "electronica meets country rock" song, demonstrating the sound of a CD player "skipping", as well as the lyrics with Madonna urging her lover to stop controlling her actions and feelings.

The seventh track, "Don't Tell Me", was described as an "electronica meets country rock" song. It begins with the sound of an acoustic guitar edited to sound like a CD player "skipping"; every fourth beat is followed by a small silence that eventually builds into the chorus. Lyrically, Madonna urges her lover to stop controlling her actions and feelings, while conjuring up unnatural, Western-inspired imagery through the lyrics, such as "Tell the bed not to lay / Like the open mouth of a grave, yeah / Not to stare up at me / Like a calf down on its knees" and "Take the black off a crow / But don't tell me I have to go". The feminist "What It Feels Like for a Girl" begins with Gainsbourg's monologue from the film The Cement Garden, in which a female voice opines "Girls can wear jeans and cut their hair short, because it's okay to be a boy. But for a boy to look like a girl is degrading, because you think that being a girl is degrading. But secretly, you'd love to know what it's like, wouldn't you? What it feels like for a girl." This is followed by percussion, a rhythm section supported by string pads, and the chord sequence which highlights the melody. The ambient production has a number of sounds floating in and out of the track, long echos and vocals being pulled back. It also features the same sound of a CD player "skipping" heard on the previous song. Lyrically, Madonna condemns male chauvinism by addressing hurtful myths about female inferiority and female role-playing in society, and invites male listeners to imagine themselves as girls.

The following track, "Paradise (Not for Me)", is a ballad which finds the singer "trampled and sad". It begins with the juxtaposition of a marimba and a child-like half-whispered voice, and from time to time Madonna's vocals are joined by an android. She also sings the second verse in French. "Gone", the final track on the American and Canadian versions of the album, continues the depressed mood of the previous tracks, featuring a "schizophrenic future-folk" production, contrasting acoustic guitars with electronic elements. Lyrically, it presents a spiritually disquieted Madonna who proclaims that "selling out is not my thing", addressing how fame has affected her personal life. Some international editions of Music include "American Pie" from The Next Best Thing soundtrack as a bonus track; the production combines futuristic electro-pop elements with rock from the 1970s. Madonna's co-star, actor Rupert Everett also provided backing vocals. Madonna's version cuts most of the lyrical content from the original song. The B-side, "Cyber-Raga" was recorded during the album sessions and is included on the Japanese and Australian release of the album. It is sung in Sanskrit and is an ode of devotion to a higher power and a wish for peace on earth.

== Artwork and release ==
The album artwork for Music was taken from an April 10–13, 2000 photo shoot by French fashion photographer Jean Baptiste Mondino at Smashbox Studios in Los Angeles. Madonna and Mondino had collaborated several times previously and Mondino would also go on to direct the music video for Don't Tell Me. The original concept of a cowboy-inspired aesthetic for the album was suggested by Mondino, who was commissioned to photograph the artwork. Although initially reluctant with the idea, Madonna loved the final result and was inspired to use the style as a basis for the album's design and visuals. Styling for the photo shoot was handled by Arianne Phillips, who had taken inspiration from Rodeo Girl, a photography book by Lisa Eisner and had the idea to style vintage Western clothing and cowboy hats with rhinestone-embellished cowboy shirts, jeans and high heels. The visuals and typographical style paid homage to the iconography of the American West, celebrating Americana culture while simultaneously satirizing it. Santiago Fouz-Hernández, author of Madonna's Drowned Worlds: New Approaches to Her Subcultural Transformations, described the visual as "a complete celebration of camp" and an evocation of Judy Garland. Madonna's cyber-cowgirl image would eventually become one of her most recognized reinventions. The album's packaging and design were created by Kevin Reagan.

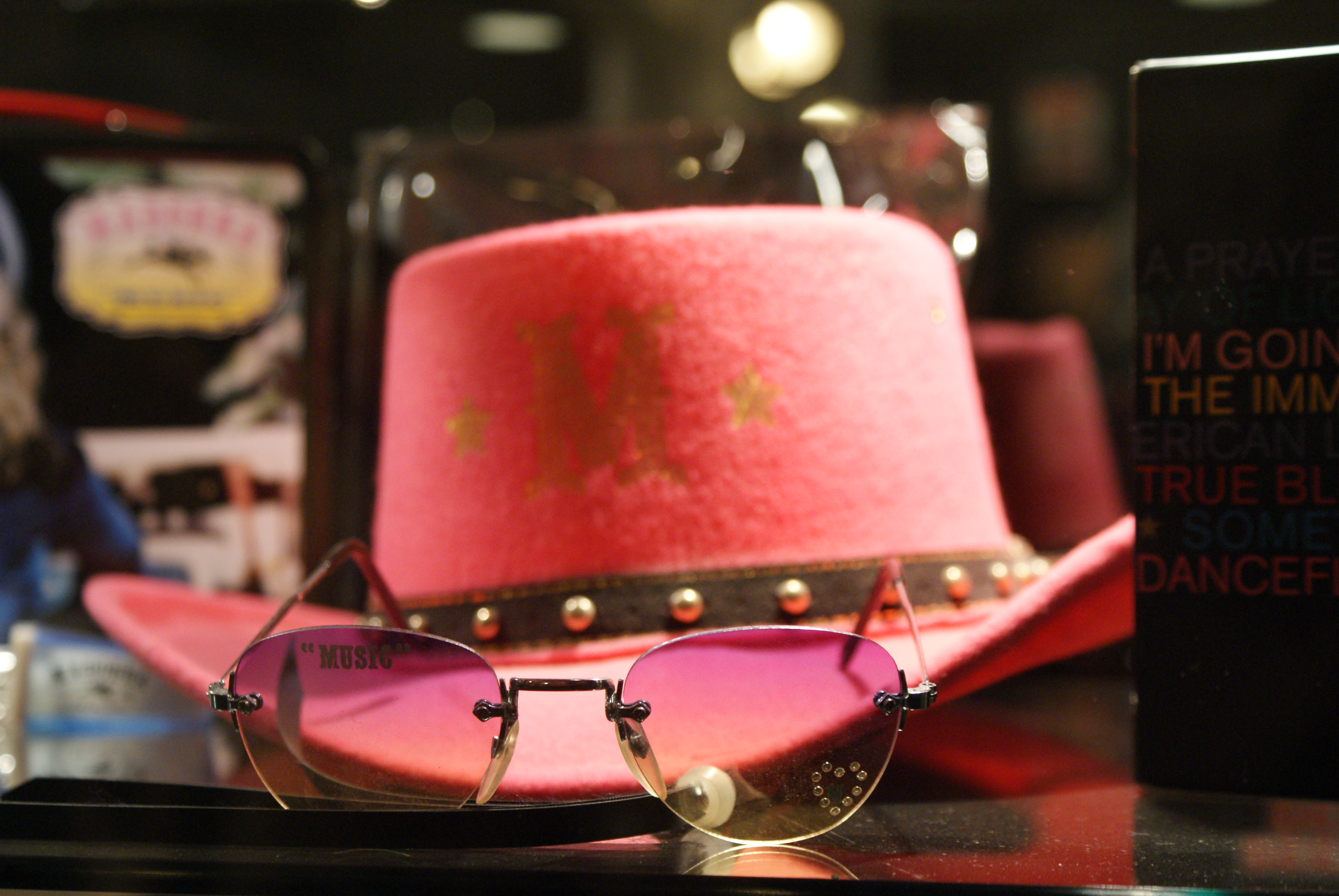
A cowgirl hat and pink shades, two of the various promotional items produced to support the album's release

On August 22, 2000, a month before the album's official release, all tracks from Music were leaked online through Napster. Maverick and Warner Bros. Records first published the album on September 18, 2000, in regions including Australia, Japan, and the United Kingdom, containing two bonus tracks, "American Pie" and "Cyber-raga", in the first two countries. It was released a day later in the United States. A limited edition was also released, which contained a 24-page booklet about the album, a copper brooch with the album's logo and two stickers, wrapped in a linen cloth available in four different colors. Additionally, the international version included "American Pie" as a bonus track, a decision Madonna later regretted, explaining it was "something a certain record company executive twisted my arm into doing". As a result, it was not added as a bonus track in the United States and Canada. The album was also made available on digital download through Madonna's website on Apple's QuickTime format, including exclusive access to two remixes of "Music". The edition released in Mexico contains the bonus tracks the Spanish version of "What It Feels Like for a Girl", titled "Lo Que Siente la Mujer", and a remix of the song by Above & Beyond. A special edition was released to promote the Drowned World Tour with a bonus CD containing remixes and the video of "What It Feels Like for a Girl".

Madonna chatted with fans through her first live chat on AOL on the day of Music's release in the United Kingdom. In order to celebrate the album's release, she held a release party at dance emporium Catch One in Los Angeles, on September 20, 2000. The £1.4 million party was attended by 600 selected guests who received special invitations. The invitations were sent out in white leather boxes, lined with black fur. A gold necklace was inside with letters spelling out the album's title, and only those wearing the necklaces would be allowed into the club. More than a dozen strippers were in attendance as a reference to the music video for "Music". She sported a five-carat diamond ring Ritchie gave her for her birthday, and a black T-shirt that read "Snatch Coming Soon" promoting Ritchie's film, while he promoted Madonna's album wearing a T-shirt with the word Music emblazoned on it. Among those who attended the party were Sheryl Crow, Gwen Stefani, Guy Oseary, and George Clinton, who arrived with Macy Gray in a horse-drawn carriage. Ritchie was initially denied access into the VIP lounge by a security guard who did not know who he was, and reportedly got into a shoving match with him.

== Promotion ==
=== Live performances ===
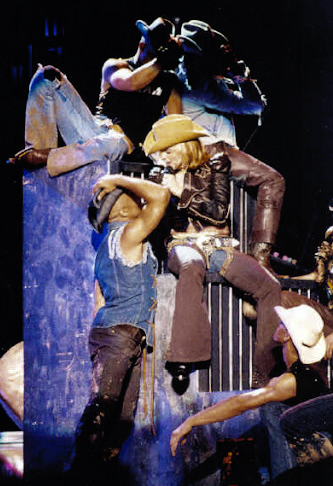
Madonna and her dancers perform second single "Don't Tell Me" dressed as cowboys on one of the concerts of 2001's Drowned World Tour

Following the album's release, Madonna embarked on a promotional tour and appeared on several television shows to publicize the album. She gave an interview and performed "Don't Tell Me" on The Late Show with David Letterman on November 3, 2000, marking her first appearance on the show since her controversial appearance in 1994. She then traveled to Europe to further promote the album. The singer performed "Don't Tell Me" on German game show Wetten, dass..? on November 11, 2000. At the MTV Europe Music Awards 2000, Madonna performed "Music" on November 16, in Stockholm, Sweden. After being introduced by Ali G as "Maradona", she performed the song wearing a T-shirt with the name of Australian singer Kylie Minogue printed on it. She later performed "Don't Tell Me" and "Music" on British television program Top of The Pops, in an appearance aired on November 17. One week later, the singer performed the same songs live on French television program Nulle Part Ailleurs. Madonna additionally performed "Don't Tell Me" on Carràmba! Che fortuna in Italy, on December 2, 2000, hosted by Raffaella Carrà.

On February 21, 2001, she performed "Music" at the 43rd ceremony of the Grammy Awards. During the performance, the stage was equipped with five large video screens that displayed images from various moments from her career. Madonna entered onto the stage in a classic Cadillac driven by rapper Bow Wow. The singer emerged from the back seat of the car in a full-length fur coat and a hat, quickly removing the clothes to reveal a tight leather jacket and jeans. She removed her jacket to reveal a black tank top with the words "Material Girl" printed on it, a reference to her 1984 single.

Madonna also held two small promotional concerts to promote Music. The first was on November 5, 2000, at Roseland Ballroom in New York; it was a free concert for an audience of 3,000 people, exclusively for contest winners and select celebrities. The costumes and set were designed by Dolce & Gabbana and reflected Madonna's cowgirl persona, with the stage decked as a neo-Western wonderland, with bales of hay, yellow-lit horseshoes and silver cacti throughout the lobby and entrance. Songs performed included "Impressive Instant", "Runaway Lover", "Don't Tell Me", "What It Feels Like for a Girl", and "Music". For the performance, she wore a T-shirt with "Britney Spears" written on it. The second concert was held at Brixton Academy in London, on November 29, 2000. It was broadcast via the internet through MSN's website to an estimated record-breaking 9 million viewers across the world. The setlist was the same from the Roseland Ballroom concert, with "Holiday" (1983) being added to the setlist. For the London concert, Madonna's T-shirt displayed the names of her children Rocco on the front, and Lola on the back. Another concert was planned to take place in Paris, but it did not happen.

=== Concert tour ===
To promote Music and Ray of Light, Madonna embarked on the Drowned World Tour, her fifth concert tour. Originally planned to start in 1999, it was pushed back to 2001 and was her first tour since The Girlie Show (1993). When Madonna decided to go on tour, she was met with time constraints and had only three months to prepare the show. Jamie King served as the creative director and the choreographer of the show. The concert was divided into different thematic acts: Rock 'n' Roll Punk Girl, Geisha Girl, Cyber Cowgirl, and Spanish Girl/Ghetto Girl, with each act representing a phase of Madonna's career. The tour received positive reviews and was a commercial success; with a gross of US$75 million, it was the year's highest-grossing tour by a solo artist and fourth overall. Drowned World was nominated for Major Tour of the Year and Most Creative Stage Production at the 2001 Pollstar awards, but lost them to U2. The concert was broadcast live on HBO from The Palace of Auburn Hills in Auburn Hills, Michigan on August 26, 2001. On November 13, it was released on home video under the title Drowned World Tour 2001.

=== Singles ===
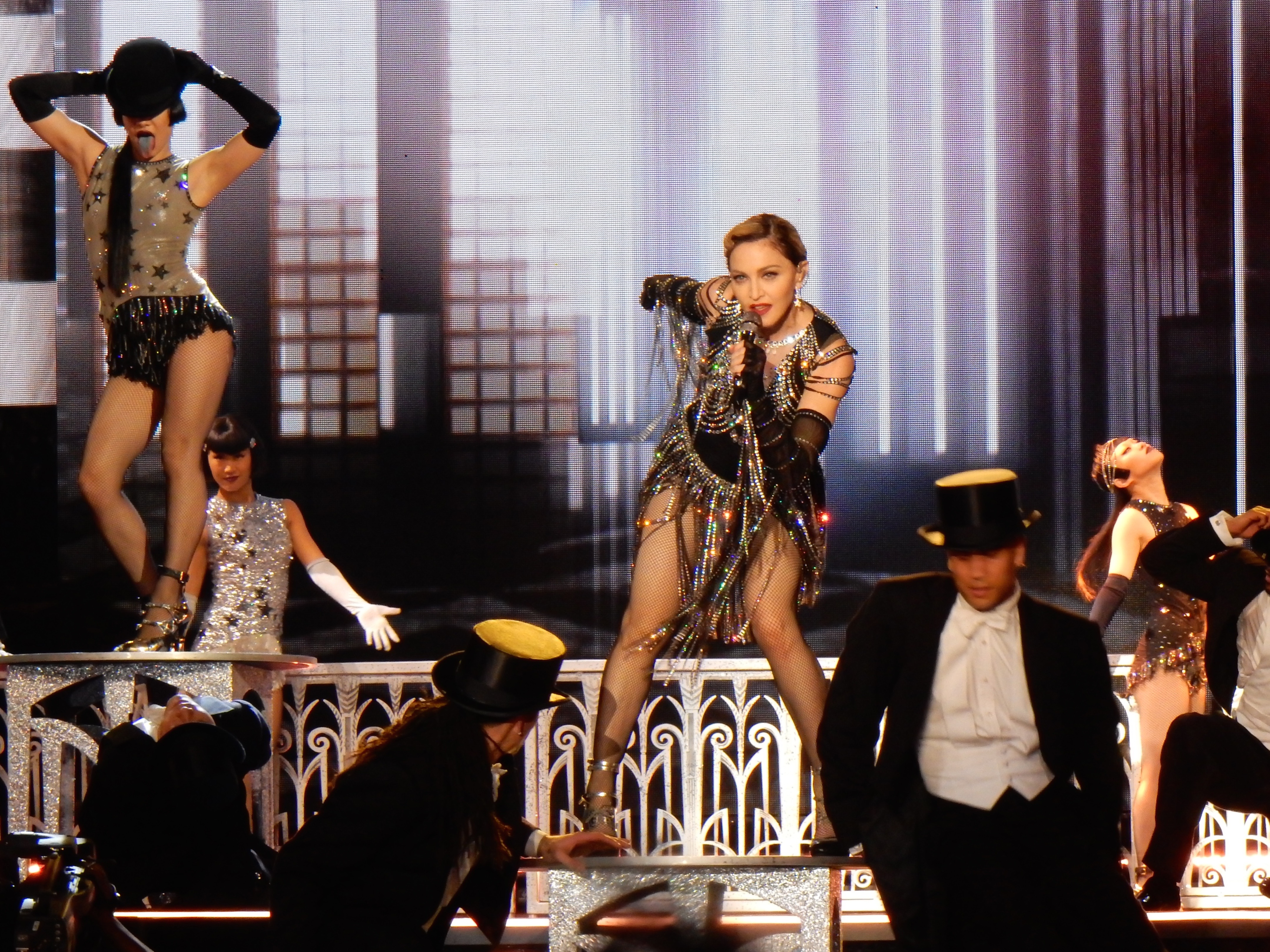
Released as lead single, title track "Music" became Madonna's 12th number one on the US Billboard Hot 100. In the image, the artist sings the track on 2015-2016's Rebel Heart Tour.

"Music" was made available commercially as the lead single from the album on August 21, 2000. It had previously been leaked on internet platforms such as Napster, leading Madonna's team to respond with a statement threatening to take legal measures against them. It has been praised by contemporary critics. The single achieved international success by topping the charts in 25 countries worldwide. It became Madonna's 12th number-one single on the US Billboard Hot 100, making her tie the Supremes as the fifth artist with most Hot 100 number-ones. In the United Kingdom, "Music" also reached at number one on the UK Singles Chart, with the singer becoming the first solo female artist to collect ten number-one singles.

"Don't Tell Me" was released to radios in the United States on November 28, 2000, as the second single from the album, while "Music" was slowly descending on the charts. It reached number four on the Hot 100 chart, tying Madonna with the Beatles as the artist with the second-most top-ten singles in the chart history. In 2015, Billboard ranked "Don't Tell Me" at number 26 on their list of "Madonna's 40 Biggest Hits" on the Hot 100. The song topped the music charts in Canada, Italy, and New Zealand, while attaining top-ten positions on the charts in a number of European nations. In 2005, the song was placed at number 285 on Blender magazine's The 500 Greatest Songs Since You Were Born.

"What It Feels Like for a Girl" was released to North American contemporary hit radios as the third and final single from the album, on April 6, 2001. It received positive commentary from contemporary critics. The song was not able to reach the top 20 on the Hot 100, but topped the US Dance Club Songs chart. However, "What It Feels Like for a Girl" attained the top-ten in several other countries worldwide. The music video, directed by Guy Ritchie, portrays Madonna as an angry woman on a crime spree. Reviewers criticized the video for being overly violent and graphic, and was banned from most North American and European video stations, receiving only early hours play.

"Impressive Instant" was released as a promotional single with remixes commissioned by Peter Rauhofer. It was not released commercially and was not promoted to radio, therefore it did not appear on any sales or airplay charts of Billboard. It went to number one on the Dance Club Songs chart where it stayed for two weeks, becoming Madonna's 27th number-one song on the chart. Madonna had planned for the song to be the fourth official single from Music, but her record label intended to release "Amazing" instead, issuing promos and test pressings for the track. However, due to a lack of consensus, no additional singles were released.

== Critical reception ==
Contemporaneous reviews
Aggregate scores
Source	Rating
Metacritic	80/100
Review scores
Source	Rating
Entertainment Weekly	B
The Guardian	3/5 stars
NME	8/10
Q	4/5 stars
Rolling Stone	4/5 stars
Spin	7/10
The Village Voice	A

Music guides and retrospective reviews
Review scores
Source	Rating
AllMusic	4/5 stars
Blender	4/5 stars
Pitchfork	8.0/10
The Rolling Stone Album Guide	4/5 stars
Tom Hull – on the Web	A−

Music received acclaim from music critics. At Metacritic, which assigns a normalized rating out of 100 to reviews from mainstream publications, the album received an average score of 80, based on 16 reviews, indicating "generally favorable reviews". Stephen Thomas Erlewine of AllMusic praised the album's layered music and described Madonna's collaboration with Ahmadzaï as the reason why the album "comes alive with spark and style". Robert Christgau from The Village Voice said that it has "consistency and flow" because all of its songs are good and lowbrow, and affirmed that "she's got her sass back." Vibe's Dimitri Ehrlich complimented the record's "brilliantly arranged keyboards, futuristic drums, and electronica dressings" and felt it was a "weird and fresh-sounding album". Alex Pappademas from Spin said that the album is "a much-needed breath of fresh VapoRub", and noted that it is "the first Madonna record in years that feels as effortless as the dance-pop of her Ciccone youth". Danny Eccleston, in a review for Q, called it "brave, radical and punchy", as well as "Madonna without a safety net". Billboard's Michael Paoletta noted how "much of the set is vibrant and uplifting in tone" and although the project is "decidedly steeped in youth culture", it "rarely courts the teens that seemingly control the charts".

Gary Crossing of Dotmusic described Music as "generally an upbeat dancey album which finds Madonna still ahead of the game sixteen years into her career". John Hand of the BBC News said that the melancholic tone of Ray of Light had been replaced by "real energy and a renewed sense of fun" on Music, and wrote that "the production may be breathtaking thanks to Orbit and Mirwais but at the centre of it all is Madonna, resolutely doing it her way". Classifying it as Madonna's first "headphones album", Blender's Tony Power also observed that it was "more playful and less pompous than Ray of Light." In the same vein, Greg Kot from Chicago Tribune called Music the "groove-happiest" Madonna had been since The Immaculate Collection (1990), and said it was more dance-friendly in contrast to the "highly introspective" Ray of Light. In a review for Rolling Stone, Barry Walters also compared Music to Ray of Light, stating that the former was a rough and improvised version of the latter, but lauded that Madonna had chosen to make a more "instinctive" record than her previous endeavors. Jason Ferguson of MTV also thought it was more exciting than any mainstream record since Ray of Light, as well as "an incredibly engaging and thoroughly interesting album".

Michael Hubbard of MusicOMH stated that Orbit's work on the album was "rather too similar" to some tracks on Ray of Light, but complimented Madonna for coming back "with something else that proves she's still the best out there". In a review for Slant Magazine, Sal Cinquemani criticized Madonna's collaborations with Orbit, calling them repetitive and uninteresting, despite being catchy; he also felt the record seemed "more like a collection of songs than a cohesive album". David Browne was less enthusiastic in Entertainment Weekly, calling it "her most patchwork record since the Sean Penn years" and "frustratingly inconsistent", which "feels like a collection of sounds – clever, intriguing ones, to be sure – that seek to compensate for ordinary melodies and Madonna's stoic delivery." Victoria Segal from NME said that Music is "deliberately upstaged by beats so showy they belong in a strip joint", which almost managed to make Madonna disappear on the record. Segal also stated that the "bluntly explicit title" was not ironic as the record was "about the music, not Madonna; about the sounds, not the image." Stephen Thompson of The A.V. Club panned it as "a dreadfully dull misstep" with "plenty of studio tricks but virtually no personality". The Guardian's Garry Mulholland dismissed it as "screamingly, amusingly, hypnotically naff [...] the sound of a bunch of middle-aged trend-watchers second-guessing what today's kids go for."

== Commercial performance ==
CNN reported that Music had sold over four million copies worldwide 10 days after its release. The album set a record in Warner Music Group as the biggest album shipment in the company, with three million copies worldwide in its first week of release. It debuted at number one in 23 countries. Overall, the record was the 19th best-selling album of 2001 worldwide, selling 4.1 million copies. As of October 2008, Music has sold more than 11 million units globally.

Music debuted at number one on the US Billboard 200 with over 420,000 copies sold in its first week, becoming the first Madonna album to top the chart in more than a decade since Like a Prayer (1989). The album was certified triple platinum by the Recording Industry Association of America (RIAA) on November 21, 2005. As of August 2016, Music has sold 2,934,000 copies there according to Nielsen SoundScan. It sold additional 97,000 units through the BMG Music Club, whose sales are not counted by the Nielsen SoundScan. In Canada, the album debuted at the top of the Canadian RPM Albums Chart with first-week sales of 50,300 copies and was certified platinum by the Canadian Recording Industry Association (CRIA) for shipments of 300,000 units. The album experienced success in Latin America, topping the charts in Argentina and receiving a two times platinum certification by the Argentine Chamber of Phonograms and Videograms Producers (CAPIF). It was also certified gold in Brazil, Chile, and Mexico.

The album also saw success in Asia-Pacific countries. In Australia, Music debuted at number two on the ARIA Charts on October 1, 2000, failing to reach the top spot due to the success of The Games of the XXVII Olympiad: Official Music from the Opening Ceremony. It spent 41 weeks on the chart and was eventually certified triple platinum by the Australian Recording Industry Association (ARIA). The album was also highlighted by ARIA as one of the biggest releases in their year-end report of 2000. In New Zealand, Music also debuted at number two on October 8, 2000, only behind Robbie Williams' Sing When You're Winning; it charted for 33 weeks and was certified two times platinum by Recorded Music NZ (RMNZ). The album debuted at number seven on the Oricon Albums Chart in Japan. It was later certified platinum by the Recording Industry Association of Japan (RIAJ) for sales of 200,000 copies. In Hong Kong, Music was honored at the 2001 Hong Kong Record Sales Award by the IFPI Hong Kong for becoming one of ten biggest-selling international album of the year.

In Europe, Music topped the European Top 100 Albums chart, selling two million units in its first 10 days, for which she broke records according to Billboard's Paul Sexton. It ended as one of the highest certified albums in Europe by the International Federation of the Phonographic Industry (IFPI), being certified five times platinum. The album debuted at number one on the UK Albums Chart in the United Kingdom with 152,000 copies sold, and was certified five times platinum by the British Phonographic Industry (BPI). As of January 2020, Music has sold 1,640,000 copies in the region. In Denmark, it topped the charts and was fifth best selling album in the country with 66,996 copies sold in 2000. The album was later certified two times platinum by the IFPI Danmark for sales of 100,000 units. After debuting at the top the charts in France, Music stayed for 67 weeks on the chart, before falling out on June 29, 2002. The album was certified two times platinum by the Syndicat National de l'Édition Phonographique (SNEP). The album sold 50,000 units in Poland in its first five days and was later certified with platinum by the Polish Society of the Phonographic Industry (ZPAV) for sales of 100,000 units; it ended as the best-selling foreign album of 2000 in the country.

== Legacy ==
"By the turn of the Millenium, Madonna had completely nailed the art of shape-shifting. Meanwhile, a new young generation of teen stars were breaking through in pop [...] Though Madonna, by this time 42, sometimes paid tribute to this next wave [...] Music's campy cowboy visuals and twisted, unpolished pop felt worlds apart from the rest of the pack. Most importantly, it felt like she was having fun letting loose".

— El Hunt discussing Music on the Evening Standard's ranking of Madonna albums, where it came in at number four.

Tom Breihan from Stereogum wrote that Music anticipated "a lot of things", and while Madonna did not invent any of them, they were "absent from mainstream pop music around the turn of the millennium". In his review, he added examples such as "thudding big-room" electro-house, "aggressive" vocal manipulation, "ecstatic" lyrical meaninglessness, acoustic guitars chopped up and refracted into unrecognizable shapes, joyous hedonism, robot voices, and the embrace of cowboy kitsch. Writing for the Grammy Awards' official website, Zel McCarthy called the album "a reminder of a less complicated time and a blueprint for our future", noting that Madonna could be analog and digital, acoustic or electronic. He particularly praised "Impressive Instant", describing it like "nothing anyone had heard before—20 years later, it still does."

In 2015, Rob Sheffield of Rolling Stone wrote that Music is still Madonna's "hardest-rocking and most seductive album." On the album's 20th anniversary, Joe Lynch of Billboard referred to it as "a key piece of 21st century dancefloor canon". He noted that the album was conceived during a period when American music was divided by musical genres, as well as during a time when the industry was ruled by newer artists who were adopting teen pop and urban-style oriented music. Lynch praised the album's utilization of dance-pop despite its decline in the United States at the dawn of the new millennium, in contrast to teen pop or hip-hop-flavored R&B styles that were more popular at the time. McCarthy commented that Madonna "deftly eschewed the petty cultural battles between genres and generations". The Straits Times also noted the dominance of boybands and teen pop artists, and wrote how Madonna ushered 1980s-electro as "a new retro-fad".

After the release of its title track, Billboard's Silvio Pietroluongo called "a move that could be considered either unusual or genius" about the decision of release various formats, maxi-CD and vinyl one week cassette and CD the next. It was described as a "phenomenal week at retail" and helped push "Music" to the number one at the Billboard Hot 100, giving Madonna her best one-week sales total of the Nielsen SoundScan era for a single at that time with 62,000 units. Pietroluongo remarked that "I'm finding it quite difficult to think of another maxi-CD that has scanned that many units in a week".

=== Accolades and rankings ===
Music earned a total of five Grammy Award nominations. In 2001, it won Best Recording Package, given to art director Kevin Reagan, and was nominated for Best Pop Vocal Album, while the title track was nominated for Record of the Year and Best Female Pop Vocal Performance at the 43rd edition. In 2002, Madonna received one more nomination for "Don't Tell Me" in the category of Best Short Form Music Video. Additionally, the album was recognized as the Best International Album at the Danish Music Awards, the International Pop Album of the Year at the Hungarian Music Awards, and the International Album of the Year at the NRJ Music Awards in 2001.

Music was voted the 16th and 18th best record of 2001 in the Pazz & Jop and Dean's List, both annual polls published by The Village Voice. Spin also named the record the 18th best album of 2000. On NME's list of the 50 best albums of 2000, the album was ranked at number 47. Three editors of Billboard also chose Music in their top five of best-of albums of 2000. It was also featured in a number of the best albums of the decade; Slant Magazine included the album on their list of "The Best Albums of the Aughts" at number 31, while it was included at WFPK's 500 Albums of the 2000s at number 223. In 2003, the album was listed at number 452 on Rolling Stone's The 500 Greatest Albums of All Time. It was Madonna's fourth album on the list, the most among female artists. In 2005, Music was featured in the book 1001 Albums You Must Hear Before You Die.

== Track listing ==
Music track listing
No.	Title	Writer(s)	Producer(s)	Length
1.	"Music"	Madonna; Mirwais Ahmadzaï	Madonna; Ahmadzaï	3:44
2.	"Impressive Instant"	Madonna; Ahmadzaï	Madonna; Ahmadzaï	3:37
3.	"Runaway Lover"	Madonna; William Orbit	Madonna; Orbit	4:46
4.	"I Deserve It"	Madonna; Ahmadzaï	Madonna; Ahmadzaï	4:23
5.	"Amazing"	Madonna; Orbit	Madonna; Orbit	3:43
6.	"Nobody's Perfect"	Madonna; Ahmadzaï	Madonna; Ahmadzaï	4:58
7.	"Don't Tell Me"	Madonna; Ahmadzaï; Joe Henry	Madonna; Ahmadzaï	4:40
8.	"What It Feels Like for a Girl^{[a]}"	Madonna; Guy Sigsworth; David Torn^{[b]}	Madonna; Sigsworth; Mark "Spike" Stent	4:43
9.	"Paradise (Not for Me)"	Madonna; Ahmadzaï	Madonna; Ahmadzaï	6:33
10.	"Gone"	Madonna; Damian LeGassick; Nik Young	Madonna; Orbit; Stent	3:24
Total length:				44:40

International, Japanese, Australian edition and 2016 North American vinyl reissue bonus track
No.	Title	Writer(s)	Producer(s)	Length
11.	"American Pie"	Don McLean	Madonna; Orbit	4:33
Total length:				49:13

Japanese and Australian edition bonus track
No.	Title	Writer(s)	Producer(s)	Length
12.	"Cyber-Raga"	Madonna; Talvin Singh; (adapted from traditional text)	Madonna; Singh	5:33
Total length:				54:46

2001 Special Tour edition bonus disc
No.	Title	Writer(s)	Remixer(s)/Producer(s)	Length
1.	"Music" (Deep Dish Dot Com Remix)	Madonna; Ahmadzaï	Dubfire and Sharam for Deep Dish	11:22
2.	"Music" (HQ2 Club Mix)	Madonna; Ahmadzaï	Hex Hector; Mac Quayle	8:51
3.	"Don't Tell Me" (Timo Maas Mix)	Madonna; Ahmadzaï; Henry	Timo Maas; Martin Buttrich	6:55
4.	"Don't Tell Me" (Tracy Young Club Mix)	Madonna; Ahmadzaï; Henry	Tracy Young; Chris Crane; (co-producer)	11:00
5.	"What It Feels Like for a Girl" (Paul Oakenfold Perfecto Mix)	Madonna; Sigsworth	Paul Oakenfold; Andy Gray	7:20
6.	"Lo Que Siente La Mujer" (What It Feels Like for a Girl)	Madonna; Sigsworth; (Spanish translation: Alberto Ferreras)	Madonna; Sigsworth; Stent	4:44
7.	"What It Feels Like for a Girl" (video)	Madonna; Sigsworth; Torn	Above & Beyond	4:36
Total length:				54:48

Notes

- ^{^a}"What It Feels Like for a Girl" contained a spoken word sample by actress Charlotte Gainsbourg from the 1993 British film The Cement Garden.
- ^{^b}David Torn was not credited on the original liner notes of Music. Madonna added him as a co-writer of "What It Feels Like for a Girl" after she found out Sigsworth had sampled from Torn's 1987 album, Cloud About Mercury, without her knowledge.
- The Mexican edition includes the bonus tracks "Lo Que Siente La Mujer" (What It Feels Like for a Girl), and "What It Feels Like for a Girl" (Above & Beyond Club Radio Edit).

== Personnel ==
Credits adapted from the album's liner notes.

=== Musicians ===
- Madonna – vocals, guitar
- Steve Sidelnyk – drums
- Guy Sigsworth – guitar, keyboard, programming
- William Orbit – keyboard, guitar, programming, backing vocals
- Mirwais Ahmadzaï – guitar, keyboard, programming
- Sean Spuehler – programming
- Michel Colombier – string arrangement

=== Technical ===
- Madonna – production
- William Orbit – production (tracks: 3, 5, 10)
- Guy Sigsworth – production (track 8)
- Mirwais Ahmadzaï – production (tracks: 1, 2, 4, 6, 7, 9)
- Mark "Spike" Stent – production (tracks: 8, 10); mixing
- Jake Davies – engineering
- Mark Endert – engineering
- Geoff Foster – engineering, string engineer
- Sean Spuehler – engineering
- Tim Lambert – engineering assistance
- Chris Ribando – engineering assistance
- Dan Vickers – engineering assistance
- Tim Young – mastering

=== Artwork ===
- Kevin Reagan – art direction, design
- Matthew Lindauer – design
- Jean-Baptiste Mondino – photography

== Charts ==
=== Weekly charts ===
Weekly chart performance for Music
Chart (2000)	Peak position
Argentine Albums (CAPIF)	1
Australian Albums (ARIA)	2
Australian Dance Albums (ARIA)	1
Austrian Albums (Ö3 Austria)	1
Belgian Albums (Ultratop Flanders)	2
Belgian Albums (Ultratop Wallonia)	2
Canadian Albums (Billboard)	1
Canada Top Albums/CDs (RPM)	1
Czech Albums (ČNS IFPI)	1
Danish Albums (Hitlisten)	1
Dutch Albums (Album Top 100)	1
European Albums (Billboard)	1
Finnish Albums (Suomen virallinen lista)	1
French Albums (SNEP)	1
German Albums (Offizielle Top 100)	1
Greek Albums (IFPI)	1
Hungarian Albums (MAHASZ)	1
Irish Albums (IRMA)	1
Italian Albums (FIMI)	1
Japanese Albums (Oricon)	7
New Zealand Albums (RMNZ)	2
Norwegian Albums (VG-lista)	1
Polish Albums (ZPAV)	1
Portuguese Albums (AFP)	3
Scottish Albums (Official Charts)	1
Singaporean Albums (SPVA)	1
Slovak Albums (IFPI)	1
Spanish Albums (PROMUSICAE)	2
Swedish Albums (Sverigetopplistan)	1
Swiss Albums (Schweizer Hitparade)	1
Taiwanese Albums (IFPI)	1
UK Albums (Official Charts)	1
US Billboard 200	1

Chart (2026)	Peak position
Croatian International Albums (HDU)	23

=== Year-end charts ===
2000 year-end chart performance for Music
Chart (2000)	Position
Australian Albums (ARIA)	23
Austrian Albums (Ö3 Austria)	16
Belgian Albums (Ultratop Flanders)	22
Belgian Albums (Ultratop Wallonia)	20
Canadian Albums (Nielsen SoundScan)	28
Danish Albums (Hitlisten)	5
Dutch Albums (Album Top 100)	18
European Top 100 Albums (Music & Media)	12
Finnish Foreign Albums (Suomen virallinen lista)	55
French Albums (SNEP)	13
German Albums (Offizielle Top 100)	13
Italian Albums (FIMI)	12
Norwegian Spring Albums (VG-lista)	8
Norwegian Christmas Albums (VG-lista)	19
Swedish Albums & Compilations (Sverigetopplistan)	12
Swiss Albums (Schweizer Hitparade)	8
UK Albums (OCC)	10
US Billboard 200	64

2001 year-end chart performance for Music
Chart (2001)	Position
Australian Albums (ARIA)	23
Australian Dance (ARIA)	3
Austrian Albums (Ö3 Austria)	32
Belgian Albums (Ultratop Flanders)	36
Belgian Albums (Ultratop Wallonia)	34
Canadian Albums (Nielsen SoundScan)	83
Danish Albums (Hitlisten)	53
Dutch Albums (Album Top 100)	43
European Top 100 Albums (Music & Media)	10
French Albums (SNEP)	37
German Albums (Offizielle Top 100)	20
Hungarian Albums (MAHASZ)	125
Italian Albums (FIMI)	48
Norwegian Winter Albums (VG-lista)	6
Spanish Albums (AFYVE)	32
Swiss Albums (Schweizer Hitparade)	20
UK Albums (OCC)	41
US Billboard 200	49
Worldwide (IFPI)	19

=== Decade-end charts ===
2000s-end chart performance for Music
Chart (2000–2009)	Position
UK Albums (OCC)	54
US Billboard 200	159

=== All-time charts ===
21st century chart performance for Music
Chart (2000–2020)	Position
UK Albums (OCC) Albums by female artists	27

== Certifications and sales ==
Certifications and sales for Music
Region	Certification	Certified units/sales
Argentina (CAPIF)	2× Platinum	120,000^{^}
Australia (ARIA)	3× Platinum	210,000^{^}
Austria (IFPI Austria)	Platinum	50,000^{*}
Belgium (BRMA)	3× Platinum	150,000^{*}
Brazil (Pro-Música Brasil)	Gold	100,000^{*}
Canada (Music Canada)	3× Platinum	300,000^{^}
Chile	Gold	15,000
Croatia (HDU)	Silver	
Czech Republic	Platinum	
Denmark (IFPI Danmark)	2× Platinum	100,000^{^}
Finland (Musiikkituottajat)	Gold	32,515
France (SNEP)	2× Platinum	900,000
Germany (BVMI)	2× Platinum	600,000^{^}
Hungary (MAHASZ)	Gold	
Hong Kong (IFPI Hong Kong)	Platinum	
Ireland (IRMA)	Platinum	15,000^{^}
Israel	—	35,000
Italy (FIMI)	Platinum	250,000
Japan (RIAJ)	Platinum	200,000^{^}
Mexico (AMPROFON)	Gold	75,000^{^}
Netherlands (NVPI)	2× Platinum	160,000^{^}
New Zealand (RMNZ)	2× Platinum	30,000^{^}
Norway	—	100,000
Poland (ZPAV)	Platinum	100,000^{*}
Singapore (RIAS)	Platinum	45,000
South Korea	—	21,528
Spain (Promusicae)	2× Platinum	200,000^{^}
Sweden (GLF)	Platinum	100,000
Switzerland (IFPI Switzerland)	2× Platinum	100,000^{^}
Taiwan (RIT)	Platinum	100,000
Thailand	Platinum	
United Kingdom (BPI)	5× Platinum	1,640,000
United States (RIAA)	3× Platinum	3,031,000
Summaries
Europe (IFPI)	5× Platinum	5,000,000^{*}
Worldwide	—	11,000,000
^{*} Sales figures based on certification alone.^{^} Shipments figures based on certification alone.

== See also ==
- List of best-selling albums by women
- List of best-selling albums in Belgium
- List of best-selling albums in Europe
- List of UK Albums Chart number ones of the 2000s
- List of number-one albums of 2000 (Canada)
- List of number-one hits of 2000 (France)
- List of number-one hits of 2000 (Germany)
- List of number-one hits of 2000 (Italy)
- List of number-one albums of 2000 (Poland)
- List of number-one albums of 2000 (U.S.)

== Book sources ==
- Fouz-Hernández, Santiago; Jarman-Ivens, Freya (2004). Madonna's Drowned Worlds. Ashgate Publishing, Ltd. ISBN 0-7546-3372-1.
- Guilbert, Georges-Claude (2002). Madonna as Postmodern Myth: How One Star's Self-Construction Rewrites Sex, Gender, Hollywood and the American Dream. McFarland. ISBN 0-7864-1408-1.
- Metz, Andrew; Benson, Carol (1999). The Madonna Companion: Two Decades of Commentary. Music Sales Group. ISBN 0-8256-7194-9.
- O'Brien, Lucy (2008). Madonna: Like an Icon. Bantam Press. ISBN 978-0-552-15361-4.
- Rooksby, Rikky (2004). The Complete Guide to the Music of Madonna. Omnibus Press. ISBN 978-0-7119-9883-4.
- Salaverri, Fernando (2005). Sólo éxitos: año a año, 1959–2002. Spain: Fundación Autor-SGAE. ISBN 978-84-8048-639-2.
- Taraborrelli, J. Randy (2001). Madonna: An Intimate Biography. Simon & Schuster. ISBN 978-1-4165-8346-2.
