= Naive Song =

"Naïve Song"

Single by Mirwais Ahmadzaï

from the album Production
- Released: 2001
- Genre: Electro; house; electronic
- Length: 4:20 (album version); 3:43 (radio edit)
- Label: Naïve; Epic
- Composer: Mirwais Ahmadzaï
- Producer: Mirwais Ahmadzaï

Mirwais Ahmadzaï singles chronology
"Disco Science" (1999)	"Naïve Song" (2001)	"I Can't Wait" (2001)

"Naïve Song" is a song by Mirwais, released in 2001 as the second single from his second studio album Production (2000).

== Background, release, and promotion ==
In the two years that Mirwais worked on his second album, "Naïve Song" was one of the last songs he has composed and included on Production. Several remixes were released to promote the song including remixes from Dave Clarke, Les Rhythmes Digitales, and Olav Basoski. The song reached number two on the US Club dance chart on April 14, 2001.

The song was also used as a theme song for Clara Sheller, a French television series that aired from May 18, 2005 to December 3, 2008. The song was used for two seasons.

=== Music video ===
The music video was directed by Jean-Baptiste Mondino. Mondino had previously collaborated with Mirwais through his production with Mirwais's former band Taxi Girl and their music video for "Quelqu'un comme toi". The video premiered in April 2000.

== Charts ==
Chart performance for "Naive Song"
Chart (2000–2001)	Peak position
Belgium (Ultratip Bubbling Under Flanders)	5
Belgium (Ultratip Bubbling Under Wallonia)	3
Netherlands (Single Top 100)	83
UK Singles (OCC)	50
US Hot Dance Music/Club Play (Billboard)	2
