= List of Celine Dion records and achievements =

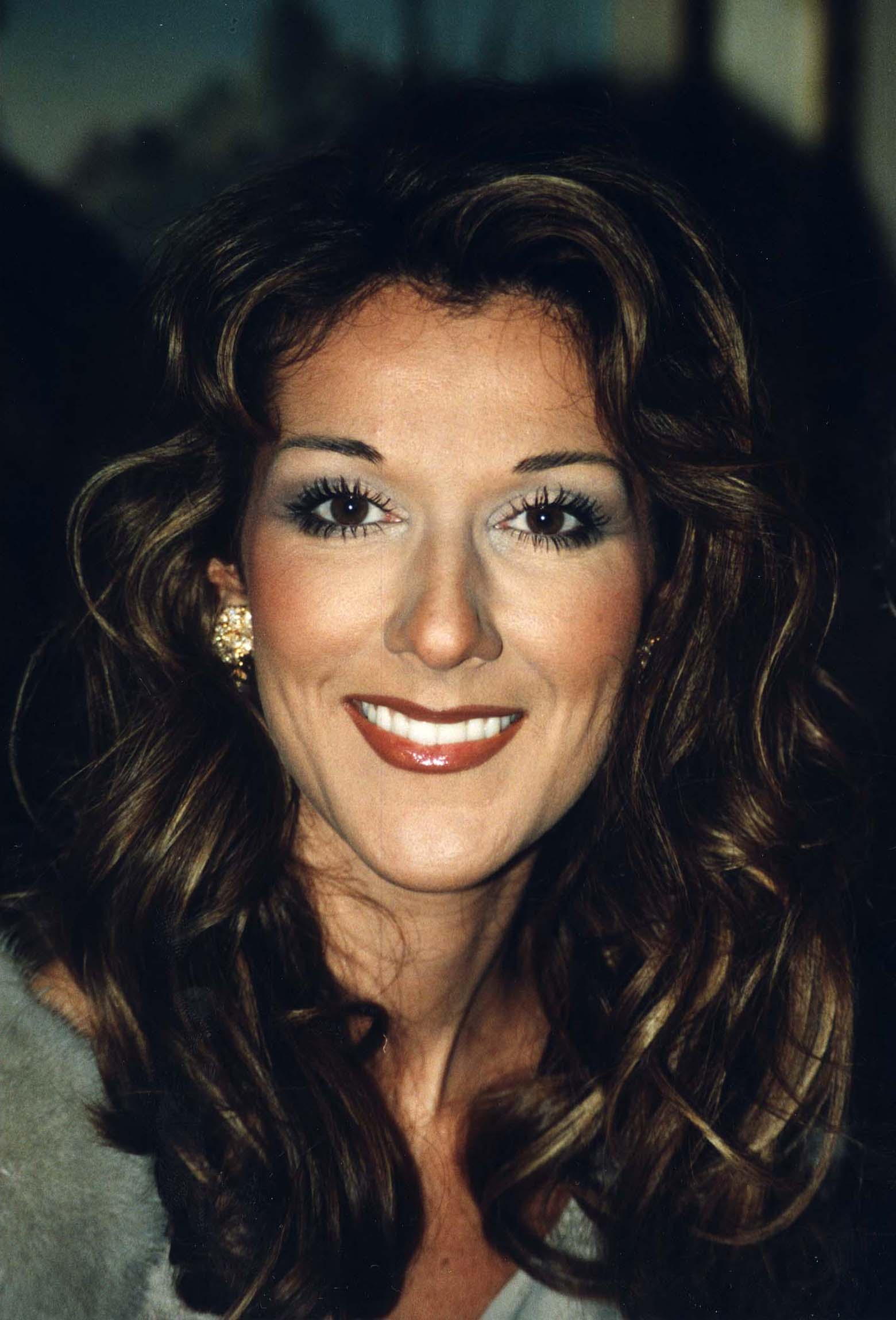
Dion in 1998

Canadian singer Celine Dion, throughout her career spanning four decades, has obtained numerous achievements, setting and breaking world records for her musical work. Her first appearance in the Guinness Book of World Records was in 1998 for being the female artist with the highest annual earnings, a record she held until 2013. She has since earned multiple appearances, including her title as the top selling album act in Europe in 2003 and the most Juno Awards nominations for any artist in 2024 among many others.

Dion has achieved mainstream popularity in the 1990s. Following the success of her album The Colour of My Love (1993), she released the best-selling French album in history, D'eux (1995). Her next two releases, Falling into You (1996) and Let's Talk about Love (1997), were worldwide successes, each selling more than 30 million copies around the world. She continued to gain success with the release of These are Special Times (1998), which is the second best-selling holiday album by a woman and All the Way... A Decade of Song (1999), which is the second best-selling compilation album by a woman ever. With record sales estimated to be around 200 to 250 million worldwide, Dion is one of the best-selling music artists of all time. In 2000, the Canadian Recording Industry Association named Dion the best-selling Canadian recording artist of the century. In 2017, Billboard named her the most successful Canadian artist in the Nielsen Music Canada era.

Since her career's inception in 1981, Dion has received numerous honorary accolades and was named by publications, such as music trade magazines and newspapers for her commercial and cultural significance. In 1999, Dion was inducted into the Canadian Broadcast Hall of Fame. In 2003, Dion was included in VH1's list of the "200 Greatest Pop Culture Icons". In 2008, Dion was conferred with the Legion of Honor, the highest French order of merit, and was elevated to the Companion of the Order of Canada in 2013. The same year, ABC listed Dion among the "30 Greatest Women in Music". In 2023, Rolling Stone named Dion the 10th greatest Canadian artist of all time. Her contributions to music have earned her two honorary doctorate degrees from Université Laval (2008) and Berklee College of Music (2021).

== Definition ==
Key
Indicates that the record is permanent and can never be broken
Indicates that the record is highly prestigious or rarely given

- Weekly or yearly achievements such as those from Billboard Year-End aren't included here, if don't represent an all-time records, by genre or cumulative feats.
- Countries with specific tabs only includes the most relevant music markets where Dion is big at: United States, Japan, UK, Germany, France & Canada.
- Records & achievements for the rest of the countries will be placed in one section (country specific records).
- Regional records and achievements (Europe, Asia, etc.) will also be grouped in one section.

== Selected global and regional records and achievements ==
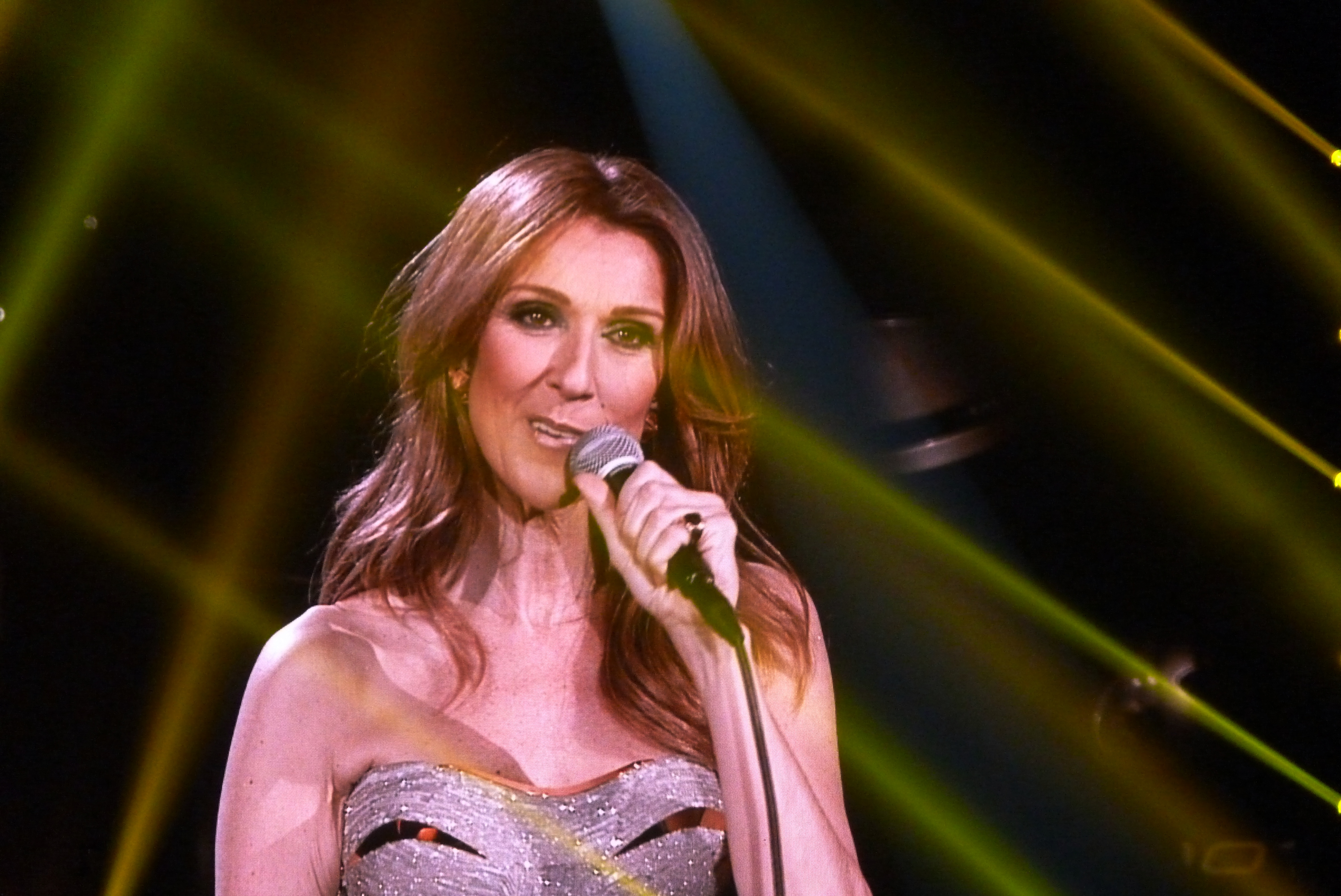
Dion performing in 2013

The following are some of Dion's most remarkable global records.

Records/achievements	Notes
Best-selling French-language albums in history	D'eux and S'il suffisait d'aimer are the top two best-selling French-language album of all time.
Best-selling contemporary female artist.	Celine Dion was placed as such in a Billboard report from 2002, denoting her 130 million records worldwide. However, Madonna is the best selling female artist of all time.
First and only female artist to have two of her albums sell over 30 million copies worldwide.	Dion's best-selling albums includes: Falling into You with 32 million global sales and Let's Talk About Love with 31 million respectively.
Top Selling Album Act in Europe	Dion has been awarded with a record of 33× Platinum certifications from the IFPI Platinum Europe Awards, in their 1996–2009 report.
First recording artist to accumulate five IFPI Platinum Europe Awards	In 1997, Dion received a total of 19 million certified sales award, the most for any artist.
World's best-selling solo artist of the 90s	By the end of the decade, Dion has sold 100 million albums in the last 10 years.
Best-selling French-language studio album of all time.	D'eux has sold 10 million copies worldwide, no other French album has sold more ever since.
Second woman in history to sell 50 million albums in Europe.	In 2003, Dion was honored by International Federation of the Phonographic Industry for selling 50 million albums in Europe.
Best-selling album of 1996 worldwide.	Dion's Falling into You has sold more than any albums released in 1996 globally.
Best-selling artist of 1997 worldwide	In 1997, Dion was honored with three World Music Awards including 'Best-selling Canadian artist' and 'Best-selling Pop artist' overall.
Best-selling studio album of 1998 worldwide.	Lets Talk about Love has sold 27 million copies in 1998 alone, rivaling the Titanic Soundtrack in global sales.
Best-selling physical single by a female artist of all time.	"My Heart Will Go On" has sold 18 million physical copies globally. No other song by a woman (other than Whitney Houston's "I Will Always Love You") has sold more.
Best-selling single of 1998 worldwide	"My Heart Will Go On" has sold 18 million physical copies globally. No other song by a woman (other than Whitney Houston's "I Will Always Love You") has sold more.
IFPI's Best-selling album in Europe ever (certified sales).	Lets Talk About Love is the highest certified album in Europe (IFPI) — 10× Platinum denoting ten million sales in the continent.
Biggest album to debut at number one in 2002.	A New Day Has Come is the biggest album to debut at number one in 2002 (reaching the top spot in 17 countries around the world).

== United States ==
Records/achievements	Notes/ref.
Second best-selling female artist in the Neilsen SoundScan era	Dion has sold 53.2 million albums in the United States, the most by any Non-American female artist.
Most number-one hits on the US Adult Contemporary radio chart	Dion has scored eleven (11) No. 1 hits on the radio chart.
Billboard's Greatest of all time artist	Eighth most successful female artist of all time on Billboard chart history.
First and only female artist to have tallied three 8-million sellers in the US since 1991	Dion's three mega sellers includes: Falling into You, Lets Talk About Love, and All the Way... A Decade of Song.
Billboard's Greatest of all time Billboard 200 (women)	Sixth most successful female artist on Billboard 200 history.
Best-selling greatest hits album by a female artist in the Neilsen SoundScan era	All the Way... A Decade of Song has sold over eight million units in the US.
Fourth female artist to score a number one album on Billboard 200 in each of the last three consecutive decades	Dion joins a small elite of women including Janet Jackson, Britney Spears & Taylor Swift.
First holiday album by a female artist to be certified 5× Platinum by RIAA	These Are Special Times is the first holiday album by a female artist to be certified 5× Platinum in the United States.
Longest gap between chart-toppers on the Billboard 200 among women	In 2019, Dion scored her first No. 1 album in the US since 2002 (17 years gap).
Second best-selling female album artist of the 2000s decade in the United States	Dion has sold 17.3 million albums throughout the decade, only Britney Spears has sold more than her.
Top 50 Adult Contemporary (AC) Artist of all time	In 2011, Dion was ranked 19th among the most successful AC artists ever.
Top Mainstream Top 40 Artist	In the period 1992 to 2012, Dion was placed at No. 28.
Greatest Pop Songs Artist of all time	Billboard ranked Dion at No. 40 among the top artists on Pop Songs Chart.
Most wins and nominations for Favorite Adult Contemporary Artist at American Music Awards	Dion has received the award four times, out of the six times she was nominated.
Greatest Billboard Hot 100 Artist of all time	Dion is ranked at No. 25, among the most successful women on the chart, as of 2017.
Most weeks at No. 1 on Adult Contemporary Chart	Dion has spent the most time atop the chart with 87 weeks.
Most AC entries and most No. 1s among all artists since her arrival	By 2012, Dion has placed 39 titles on the chart. 21 of those have reached the top 10, with 11 soaring to No. 1.
First and only English-language song by a female artist to hit No. 1 on Latin Songs	My Heart Will Go On also reached No. 1 on the Billboard Hot 100, Radio Songs, Hot Singles Sales, Pop Songs, AC and Latin Pop Songs.
Best-selling Canadian artist in the US (album sales)	By 2012, Dion has already sold 51.6 million albums in the country, dating to the advent of SoundScan data in 1991.
Fifth best-selling artist of the last 10 years (1991–2002)	According to SoundScan's 2002 figures, Dion is the fifth best-selling artist of the last 10 years with more than 39.17 million copies sold of all her albums.

== France ==
Records/achievements	Notes/ref.
Best-selling International female artist ever	Dion has sold nearly 16 million certified units in the country according to the Syndicat National de l'Édition Phonographique (SNEP).
International female artist with the most diamond-certified albums	Dion has six diamond albums in France, the most by any female artist other than Mylene Farmer.
Best-selling album in France	D'eux is the all-time best-selling album in France, selling over 4.5 million copies.
Most weeks at No. 1 (albums)	D'eux has spent 44 weeks at No. 1 on SNEP Official Album chart, the most by any artist ever.
Biggest first week sales in 2012	In 2012, Dion scored the biggest first week sales by a solo artist in 2012 with Sans attendre (95,569).
Biggest first-week sales by a woman ever	In 2016, Dion achieved the biggest first week sales by a female artist with Encore Un Soir (218,684 units).

== United Kingdom ==
Records/achievements	Notes	Ref.
• First woman to score two singles surpassing one million sales each	Celine was the first woman in history to score two seven-figure shifters with Think Twice & My Heart Will Go On.	
• Third longest climb at No. 1	After 16 weeks in the Top 100 (including 13 weeks within the Top 40), Think Twice finally hit number-one, stayed there for seven weeks and sold a million copies.	
• Fourth best-selling single by a female artist	My Heart Will Go On has sold 2.1 million units in the UK.	
Fifth female solo artist with the most No. 1 albums	Celine has scored five number-one albums in the UK.	
Fifth longest reigning No. 1 hit by a female artist	Think Twice has spent 7 weeks atop the UK singles chart.	
56th biggest album by a female artist this century	My Love: Essential Collection is one the best-selling greatest hits albums this century.	
First artist to have the No. 1 album & song simultaneously for five consecutive weeks since 1965	For five consecutive weeks, the song and album stood on top of the respective British charts, an achievement not replicated since 1965 and the heyday of The Beatles.	
Fourth best-selling album of 1996	Falling into You has sold 1.47 million copies in the UK in 1996 alone.	
Best-selling albums of the 90s decade	Falling into You (No. 10) and The Colour of My Love (No. 19)	
Best-selling singles of the 90s decade	My Heart Will Go On (No. 11 with 1,312,551 sales) and Think Twice (No. 16 with 1,234,000 sales).	

== Canada ==
Records/achievements	Notes	Ref.
Best-selling artist in the Canadian Neilsen history	Dion has sold 12.5 million certified records in the country and remains undercertified.	
Artist with the most number-one albums	Dion has 16 albums that reached the top spot (15 of which were within the Neilsen SoundScan era).	
Best Selling Canadian Recording Artist of the Century	In 1999, the CRIA Special Awards recognized Dion as the top-selling Canadian artist.	
Second biggest first week sales in Canada by any artist	After holding the record for 18 years, Adele finally broke the record with 25. Let's Talk About Love has sold 230,212 during its debut week.	
Artist with the most diamond albums	With six albums reaching diamond status, the highest amount ever by any artist.	
Biggest Canadian artist of the Nielsen Music Canada era.	In 2017, Dion was hailed as "the biggest Canadian artist" on the Billboard charts since 1996, when Neilsen Music Canada began tracking sales.	
Biggest albums by a Canadian artist (physical + digital sales)	• Lets Talk About Love (No. 2) • All the Way... A Decade of Song (No. 6) • Falling into You (No. 9) • Lets Talk About Love (No. 10)	
Biggest song of the 90s decade by a Canadian artist(digital sales)	"My Heart Will Go On" ranks at No. 3 with the most sales generated from digital music platforms.	
Biggest first week sales for any artist in 5 years	Loved Me Back to Life marked the best one week sales total (106,000 units) for any release in Canada since 2008, when AC/DC's Black Ice sold 119,000 units.	
Two of the highest sales entries in Canada for two different albums in one year (2007)	Taking Chances entered the chart at number one with 80,000 copies sold, surpassing her own record for the biggest debut of 2007 (her French-language album D'elles sold 72,000 units in its first week, marking an unprecedented achievement in Canadian Nielsen SoundScan history.	

== Japan ==
Records/achievements	Notes	Ref.
Best-selling single by an international female artist	"To Love You More" has sold 1.5 million copies in the country.	
Second best-selling western female artist ever (albums)	Dion has sold over seven million certified records in the country (although she remains undercertified).	
Fourth North American artist to reach No. 1 on Oricon Singles Chart.	Dion remains the most recent Western artist to reach the top of the singles chart in Japan.	
First international artist to reach number 1 on the Oricon Singles Chart since 1983	The last artist to reach No. 1 was Irene Cara with the song "Flashdance... What a Feeling."	
Second best-selling single by a western artist ever	"To Love You More" is one of the only three single to sell a million units in the country.	
One of the three western female artist with multiple RIAJ million (Diamond) selling albums	All the Way... A Decade of Song (2× Diamond) and Let's Talk About Love (Diamond).	

== Germany ==
Records/achievements	Notes	Ref.
Third best-selling international female artist in Germany	Dion has sold 8 million certified sales in the country, a figure only surpassed by Madonna and Rihanna.	
Best-selling albums in Germany	• Let's Talk About Love (1.5 million) • Falling into You (1.25 million) • All the Way... A Decade of Song (1.05 million)	
Best-selling solo single by an international female artist	"My Heart Will Go On" has sold 2 million in the country, more than other singles.	

== Other records ==
This section documents Dion's other records from around the world.

Records/achievements	Notes	Ref.
Best-selling female artist in South Africa	As of 2007, Dion has sold 3 million albums in South Africa, the highest figure ever by a solo international artist.	
Top earning artist of the decade (2000–2009)	Dion was recognized by Los Angeles Times as the decade's top-earning artist, with combined album sales and concert revenue from the past decade eclipsing $748 million.	
Best-selling International female artist in Switzerland	Dion has sold 1.7 million certified sales in the country, the most by any other women in music.	
Largest vocabulary for a female recording artist	In 2015, Guinness World Records listed Dion as the tenth artist with the largest vocabulary in music (3,954).	
Forbes' wealthiest self-made women in music	Dion is ranked as the fifth richest female artist in music by Forbes, with an estimated networth of $480 million. Although most sources stated that she's already at $800 million.	
Most expensive disc ever given to an artist	In March 2002, Dion was presented with the most expensive disc ever in recognition of 15 million album and single sales in the UK.	
One of the most expensive music video of all time	The entire production of "It's All Coming Back To Me Now" costs $2.3 million (or nearly $4 million adjusted for 2022 inflation).	

== List of prestigious honors and recognitions ==
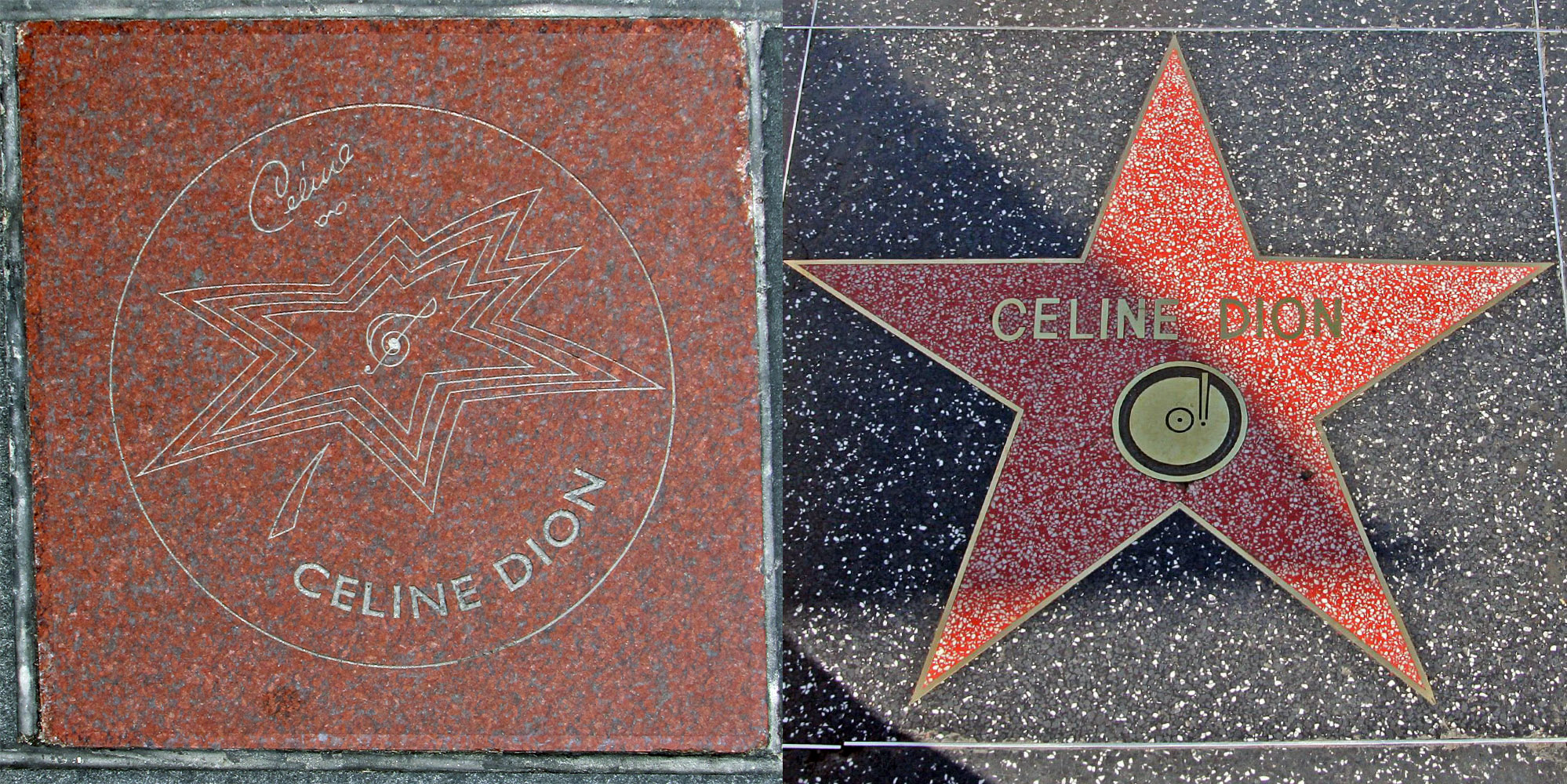
Dion's stars on Canada's Walk of Fame and the Hollywood Walk of Fame

Records/achievements	Notes	Ref.
World Music Award's "Chopard Diamond Award"	In 2004, Dion was the second women to be honored with a diamond award, recognising her status as the "biggest-selling female recording artist of all time" at that time.	
Berklee College of Music's Honorary Doctorate in Music	Doctor in music	
Billboard Music Award	Icon Award	
Canada's Walk of Fame	Inducted into Canada's Walk of Fame	
Canadian Broadcast Hall of Fame	Inducted into Canadian Broadcast Hall of Fame	
Commemorative Medallion of the 400th Anniversary of Quebec City	Commemorative Medallion	
Governor General's Awards	Medal of Recognition for the Contribution to Canadian Culture	
Hollywood Walk of Fame	Inducted with a star on the Hollywood Walk of Fame	
IFPI Special Award	In recognition of the album sales exceeding 50 million in Europe	
Kraków's Walk of Fame	Inducted into Kraków's Walk of Fame in Poland.	
Laval University's Honorary Doctorate in Music	In Recognition of the Personal and Professional Achievements	
Le Journal de Montréal Award	Artist of the Decade	
Legion of Honour	Knight of the Legion of Honour for Merits and Contributions to France.	
Midem Awards	Best-selling artist in Europe	
Order of Canada	Officer of the Order of Canada for Outstanding Contribution to the World of Contemporary Music	
Order of Canada	Companion of the Order of Canada for Worldwide Musical Influence and Commitment to Numerous Humanitarian Causes	
Ordre des Arts et des Lettres	Knight of the Ordre des Arts et des Lettres for Best Selling French-Language Artist in History	
UNESCO Awards	UNESCO Artist for Peace	
World Music Award's Legend Award	Legend Award for Outstanding Contribution to the Music Industry	

== Media responses and reception ==
"Céline Dion is a musician who has a good ear, a refinement, and a degree of perfection that is enviable."

— Maestro Kent Nagano, Orchestre Symphonique de Montreal.

MTV credits Dion for redefining hardwork and hustle, saying she was better than the likes of Whitney Houston, Cher, Tina Turner and basically almost anyone at making the most of pop's capacity to express emotions in dramatic and extravagant ways. Jon O'brien of Grammy Awards called Dion, together with Whitney Houston and Mariah Carey as "The Holy Trinity of Pop Divas", and credited them for leading the rebirth of the golden era for female vocalists.

AEG live executive John Meglin said that Dion is a bigger artist than Michael Jackson (in live entertainment). He believed that she is right up there with the likes of the King Of Pop, possibly a more bankable star. Dion is without a doubt, a big fan of Jackson and said that she has posters of him in her room growing up. Jackson notably came and attended one of Dion's Vegas shows.

Polly Anthony (former president) of Epic Records Group said that Dion is the "epitome of a global artist", further adding that numerous people from all around the world have become devoted lovers of her voice. As of March 2003, Billboard reported that she has already sold 150 million albums worldwide, the most by any female artist at that point.

Eric Boehlert of Rolling Stone discussed Dion's selling power in an article published in 1998, stating that she has sold 22 million albums in just one year time in the United States. Furthermore, this is believed to be the most for any artist ever in history, implicating that it was "unthinkable" before for any solo artist to achieve such feat. In 2023, she was placed at No. 10 on RollingStone's list of the 50 Greatest Canadian Artist of All Time.

Yasmine Shemesh of Elle Canada discussed how Dion's Falling into You changed the landscape of Pop music, implicating that the album has played a vital role in influencing genre trends of the time. Andrew Lloyd Webber praised Dion's version of Its All Coming Back To Me Now, calling it "the record of the millennium."

=== Dion's impact on other artists ===
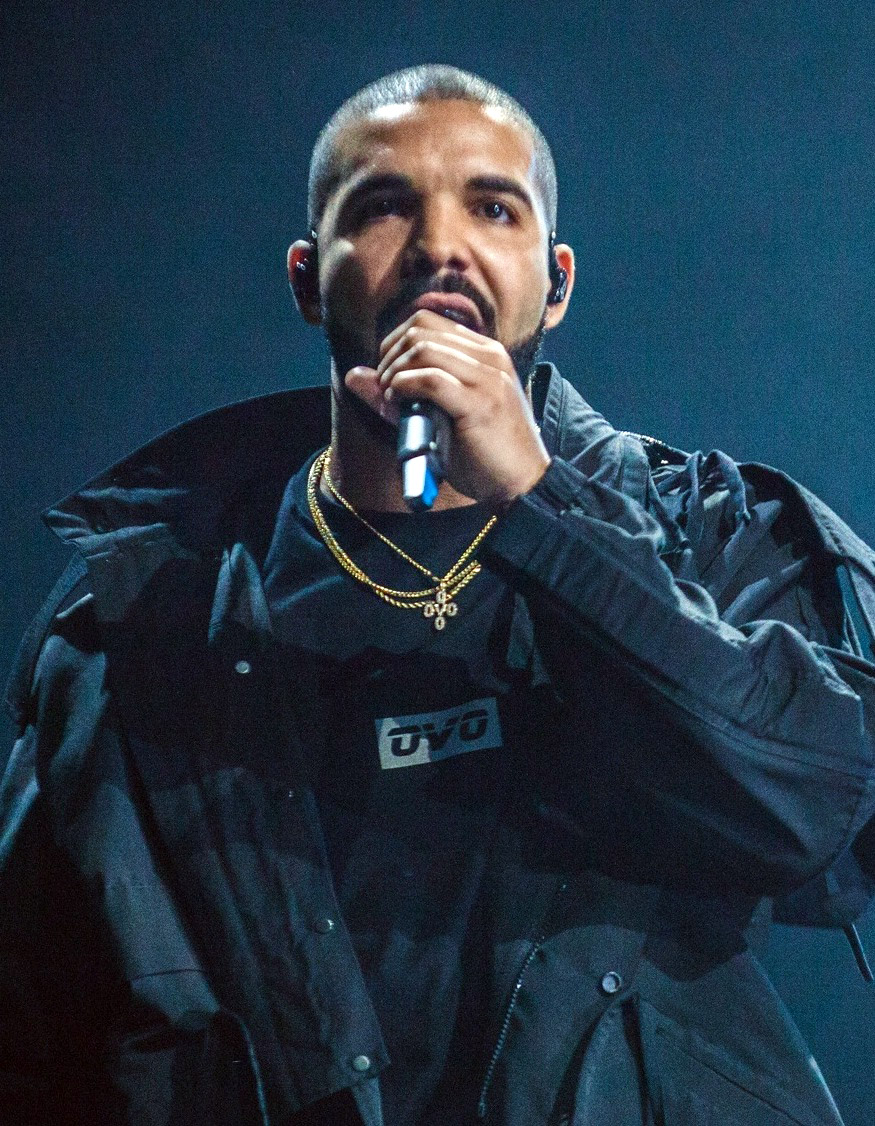
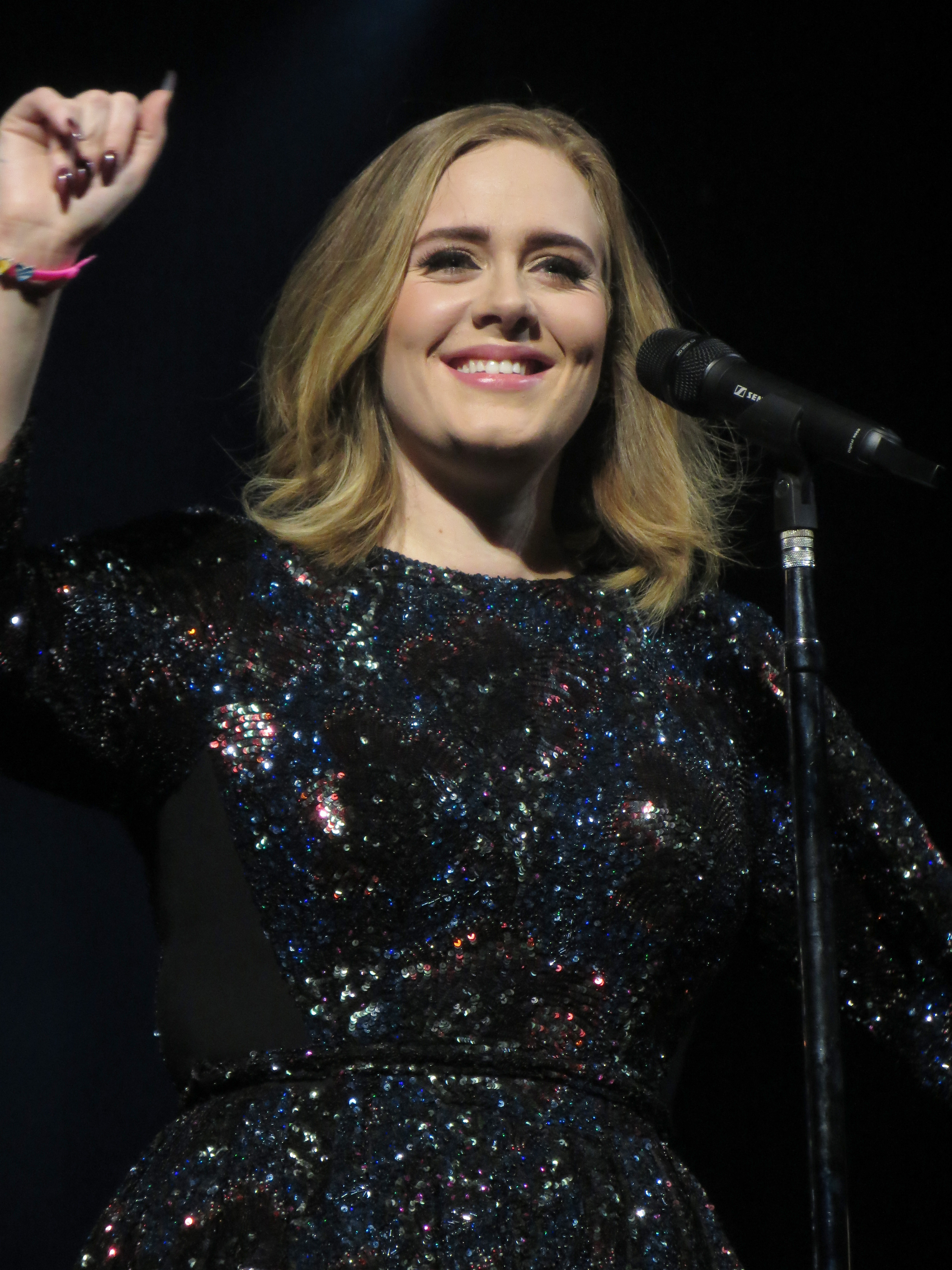
Drake and Adele has expressed admiration for Dion as both an artist and as an icon.

Its no surprise that Dion is a much-beloved superstar and is admired by even the biggest mainstream artists, including considered 'legends' in the music industry. At the 2017 Billboard Music Awards, Drake bowed to Dion upon meeting her and said the following words: "You're very iconic, we love you" and expressed his desire of getting a tattoo of her face. In a special interview with Vogue, Adele revealed that a framed piece of Dion's used chewing gum with a handwritten note is her prized possession. Adele has also attended Dion's residency show in 2018 and her BST Hyde Park Festival gig in 2019.

In an episode of her podcast on Apple Music, Queen of Country-Pop Shania Twain expressed her admiration for Dion as a musical artist, saying that every recording of Dion is a vocal challenge for Twain in any case, eventually calling her one of the greatest vocalists of all time." Sam Smith said in an interview how It's All Coming Back to Me Now helped them get through tough times. Moreover, Smith tweeted about admiring Dion after attending one of her gigs in 2019, tweeting in capslock: "Celine Dion changed my life."

After attending one of her Vegas shows in 2019, Kelly Clarkson tweeted that Dion is "possibly the most gifted vocalist on the planet." In 2021, Clarkson praised her vocal ability, saying that the reason why Dion doesn't get tired because she has two set of lungs when she sing. Selena Gomez is also a big fan of Dion. She attended one of her Vegas shows in 2016 with her friends, wearing a Céline Dion t-shirt and filmed some special moments on her Snapchat. Frank Ocean revealed in an interview that Dion is one of the artists he grew up listening to, citing her as one of his musical influences.

== Concerts gross and attendance records ==
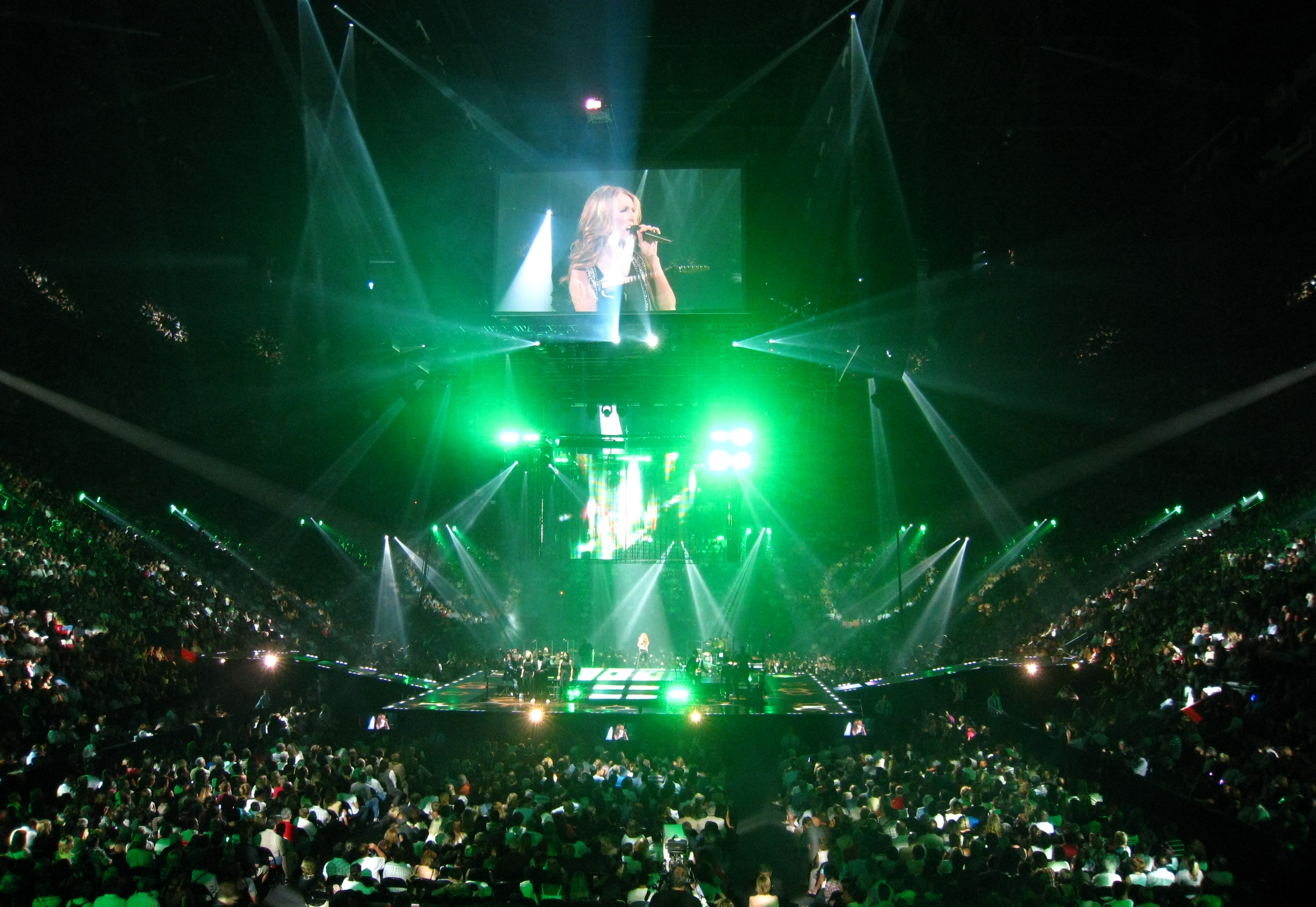
Dion performing to a sold-out show at Bell Centre

As a prominent figure in music, Celine Dion has set and broke multiple records in concepts of gross and attendance around the world. Below are examples:

Records/achievements	Notes	Ref.
Highest-grossing solo live music artist in North America of the 2000s decade.	According to Pollstar, Dion has grossed $522.2 million throughout the decade in North America, more than any other solo artist.	
Second woman to reach 1 billion in tour revenue	As of 2019, Dion has grossed $1.1 billion globally as reported by Billboard Boxscore.	
Second women with the most tickets sold worldwide	As of July 2022, Dion has sold 10.9 million tickets worldwide and is only surpassed by Madonna according to Pollstar.	
Second highest-grossing female artist of all time	Dion has reportedly grossed $1.35 billion throughout her long standing career from concert tours and residencies, slightly behind Madonna.	
Highest-grossing residency act in history	As of 2019, Dion has grossed $681 million from two of her residency shows alone.	
Biggest attendance by a female artist ever in Stade de France	Dion has performed to over 90,000 fans at a single show for a total of over 180,000 in two consecutive nights at Stade de France.	
Biggest attendance by a female artist on the Plains of Abraham	On 22 August 2008, during Quebec City's 400th anniversary celebrations, Dion performed in front of a crowd estimated at 250,000 fans, the biggest attendance in her career.	
Highest-grossing artist ever for each arenas she performed in the UK	According to AEG Presents, Dion is the highest-grossing artist for each one of the following arenas she performed in UK (2017): • SSE Hydro • London's O2 Arena • Leeds First Direct Arena • Birmingham's Barclaycard Arena	
Biggest attendance for a female solo act at Croke Park (Ireland)	Dion has played in front of over 64,000 fans, grossing $8.6 million.	
One of the biggest box office performance Taipei Arena (Taiwan)	China Times reported that there were 300,000 fans that tried to buy up the 20,000 seats available for her two shows, causing the system to lag for 30 minutes.	
Artist with the most shows performed at Belle Centre (Canada)	Dion is reported to have performed 50 shows between 1996 and 2020.	
Highest-grossing female artist at MOA Arena (Philippines)	Dion has performed in front of 16,000+ fans within the two consecutive sold-out shows.	

=== Pollstar year-end list ===
Year	Artist	Rank (Overall)	Rank (Female)	Gross
2020	Céline Dion	2	1	$71.2 million
2019	Céline Dion	33	5	$58.7 million
2018	Céline Dion	25	4	$65.2 million
2017	Céline Dion	11	1	$101.2 million
2016	Céline Dion	10	3	$85.5 million
2015	Céline Dion	77	9	$22.6 million
2014 (mid year)	Céline Dion	28	5	$21.1 million
2013	Céline Dion	23	4	$38.8 million
2012	Céline Dion	29	5	$36.5 million
2011	Céline Dion	10	4	$41.2 million

== Record sales and statistics ==
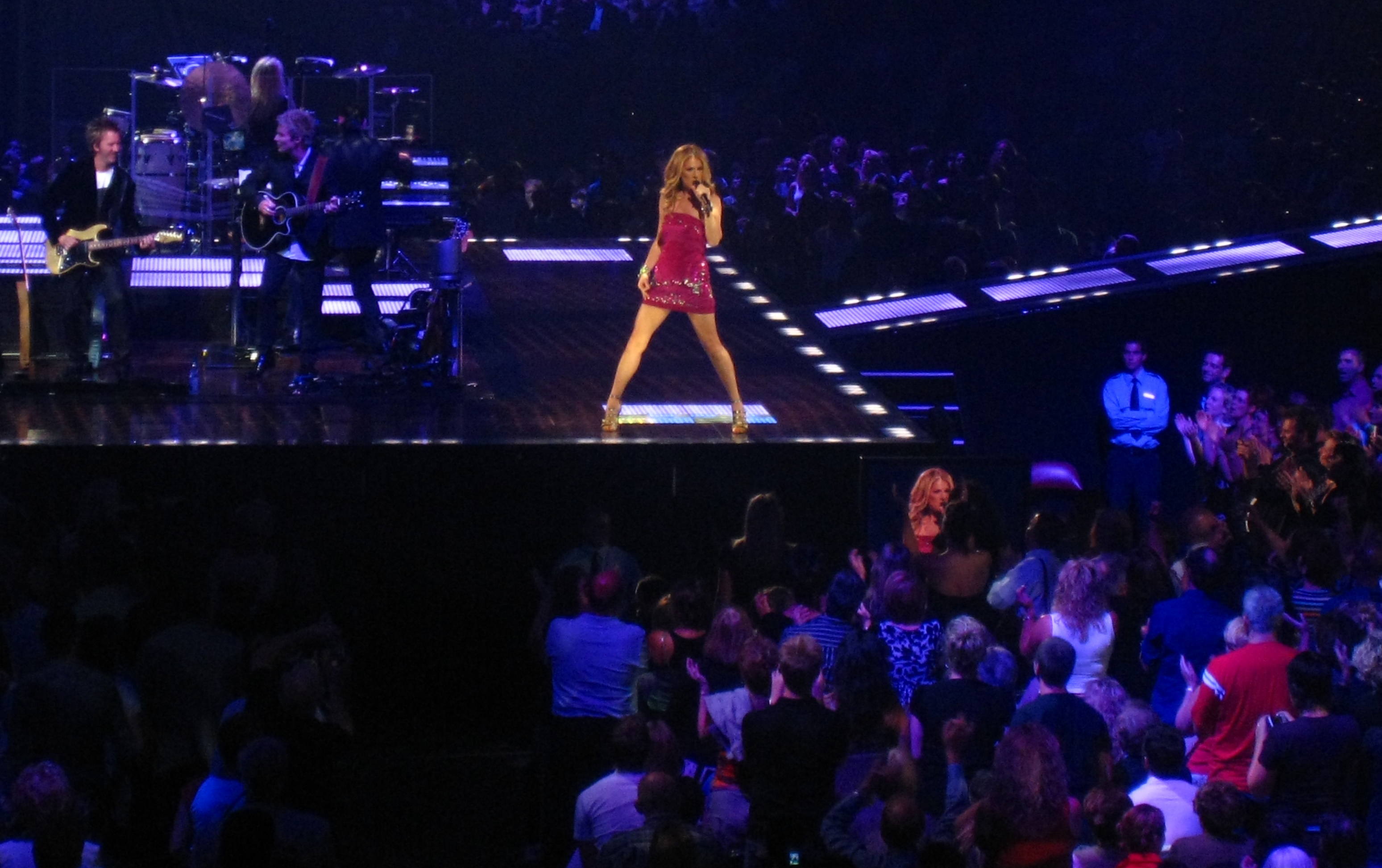
Céline Dion performing at Taking Chances World Tour.

=== Best-selling albums worldwide ===
Released year	Album	Claimed sales	Ref
1996	Falling into You	32 million	
1997	Let's Talk About Love	31 million	
1999	All the Way... A Decade of Song	22 million	
1993	The Colour of My Love	20 million	
1995	D'eux	12 million	
1998	These Are Special Times	12 million	
2002	A New Day Has Come	12 million	

=== Timeline of Dion's total career sales worldwide ===
Year	Claimed sales	Notes	Ref.
1995	40,000,000	Billboard stated that Dion has already sold 40 million records worldwide during the first 5 years since her American debut (1990–1995).	
2000	130,000,000	At this point, "All the Way... A Decade of Song" has already sold 14 million copies worldwide.	
2003	150,000,000	Up until the release of One Heart, Dion has already reached 150 million career sales.	
2004	175,000,000	World Music Awards honored Dion with the Diamond Award, recognizing her status as the biggest-selling female recording artist of all time.	
2007	200,000,000	Sony Music announced that Dion has already surpassed 200 million career sales, the most among women at that point.	
2013	220,000,000	Up until the released of Loved Me Back To Life, Dion has already reach the 220 million mark.	
2019	245,000,000	Up until 2017 and the release of Courage, Dion has already sold nearly 250 million records globally.	
2021-2024	250,000,000		

=== Best-selling albums in the United States ===
No.	Album	Total sales	Additional units from BMG Music Club	Certification	Ref.
1.	Falling into You	10.9 million	987,000 (11.8 million)	12× Platinum	
2.	Let's Talk About Love	9.6 million	1,110,000 (10.7 million)	11× Platinum	
3.	All the Way... A Decade of Song	8.2 million	1,100,000 (9.3 million)	7× Platinum	
4.	These Are Special Times	5.6 million		6× Platinum	
5.	The Colour of My Love	4.6 million		6× Platinum	

== See also ==
- List of awards and nominations received by Celine Dion
- List of highest-grossing live music artists
- Best-selling albums in the United States since Nielsen SoundScan tracking began
- List of best-selling albums by women
- List of best-selling music artists
- List of fastest-selling albums
- List of best-selling albums in Europe
