= Mirwais Ahmadzaï =

French record producer and songwriter (born 1960)

Mirwais
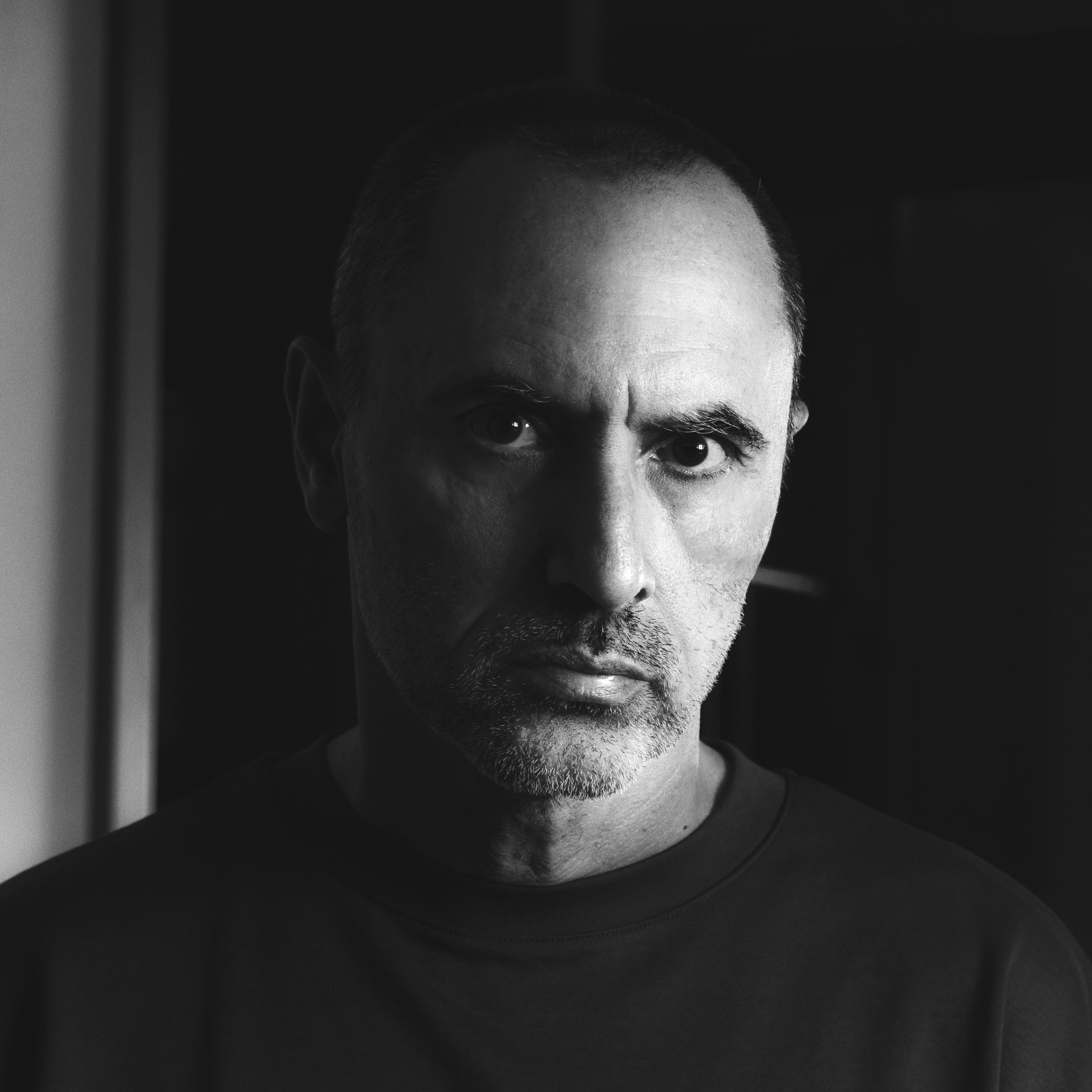
- Mirwais in 2023

Background information
- Also known as: Mirwais; Mirwais Stass
- Born: Mirwais Ahmadzaï; 23 October 1960 (age 65); Lausanne, Switzerland
- Genres: Electronica; french house; new wave; post-punk
- Occupations: Record producer; songwriter
- Years active: 1978–present
- Labels: Virgin; Emi; Naïve; Sony

Mirwais Ahmadzaï (Pashto/ میرویس احمدزی : (born 23 October 1960), known mononymously as Mirwais, is a French electronic dance music record producer and songwriter, born in Lausanne, Switzerland to an Afghan father and an Italian mother. A former member of the now-defunct 1980s group Taxi Girl, he is perhaps best known for his work with American artist Madonna, whom he first met in the late 1990s. After submitting a demo of his work to her label, Maverick Records, Mirwais eventually teamed-up with the singer in 1999 to create Music (2000), a global smash record for Madonna; the album, as well as its title track single, peaked at No. 1 or within the Top 10 on the charts of several countries and territories, including the UK, US, Canada and Australia.

== Life and career ==
=== Early life ===
Mirwais Ahmadzaï was born in Lausanne, Switzerland to an Afghan father and an Italian mother. The family lived in Kabul, Afghanistan for a while before relocating to Paris.

=== Taxi Girl and Juliette et les indépendants ===
Resultantly becoming known in France for this reason for the better part of two decades, Mirwais was a guitarist in the punk group Taxi Girl for eight years, before forming the acoustic outfit "Juliette et les Indépendants" with his then-girlfriend Juliette. Taxi Girl's first EP, "(S.O.S Mannequin)", was released in early 1980 on Pathé Marconi/EMI.

"For a teenager, the late 70s were a strange mixture of disco music and punk, and it was okay to like them all," he says. Taxi Girl captured the punk rock power of The Stooges, the techno futurism of Kraftwerk and the disco euphoria of Giorgio Moroder and molded the diametrically opposed styles into an electrifying new-wave sound that entertained and inspired a generation of listeners bored by the complacency of 80s French pop. Even the current darlings of the French electronic music scene, such as Daft Punk and Air, continue to namecheck Taxi Girl as a major influence on their artistic directions.

=== Solo career ===
In 1990, Mirwais released his eponymous debut solo album Mirwais which contained nine tracks and was performed by Mirwais exclusively in French; he had not yet learned English.

In 1998, he signed to French independent record label Naïve Records and released the single "Disco Science". This single was a success as a club dance hit and appeared in the soundtrack for the Guy Ritchie film, Snatch and the 2006 Luc Besson film Arthur and the Invisibles. In August 2000, he released the album Production, which included the single "Paradise (Not For Me)" made in collaboration with Madonna. It also included two minor chart hits in the UK Singles Chart: "Disco Science" (2000, #68) and "Naive Song" (2000, #50).
Naive Song went to number 2 on the US Dance Club Charts in 2001.

=== Madonna ===
Madonna recruited him for writing and production collaboration on five of her studio albums: Music (2000), American Life (2003), Confessions on a Dance Floor (2005), Madame X (2019), and Confessions II (2026). He also co-wrote a song that would later appear on her greatest hits album Celebration as a previously unreleased track.

Mirwais contributed the following tracks to the Madonna albums:

- Music: "Music", "Impressive Instant", "Nobody's Perfect", "Paradise (Not For Me)", "Don't Tell Me", "I Deserve It".
- American Life: Co-produced the entire record and co-wrote all songs with Madonna, with the exception of "Nothing Fails", "X-Static Process" and "Easy Ride".
- Confessions on a Dance Floor: "Future Lovers", "Let It Will Be", bonus tracks "Fighting Spirit" and "Super Pop", and the deleted tracks "Triggering" and "Keep the Trance".
- Celebration (2009 "greatest hits" compilation): iTunes bonus track "It's So Cool", a previously unreleased track from American Life.
- Madame X: "Medellín", "Dark Ballet", "God Control", "Batuka", "Killers Who Are Partying", "I Don't Search I Find", deluxe edition track "Extreme Occident", and box set-exclusive tracks "Funana" and "Ciao Bella".
- CONFESSIONS II: "Betrayal".

The Music album was nominated for three Grammy Awards including Record of the Year. "Music" won several MTV Europe awards. He was also involved in the writing and production of the title track to the movie Die Another Day, co-written and performed by Madonna. The song was nominated for a Golden Globe for Best Original Song in 2003.

=== Fischerspooner ===
Mirwais also co-produced two tracks "Cloud" and "Never Win" on Fischerspooner's second studio album Odyssey, released in 2005.

=== Y.A.S. ===
He worked on a project called Y.A.S. The official website stated: "YAS is the name of Mirwais' new project with the singer and composer Yasmine Hamdan. The album was released in France on 8 June 2009. All songs are performed by her. It is 'Arabic Avant-Garde Music'".

In an interview on 13 January 2007 published on lecourrier.ch, Mirwais said, "At the moment I work with Yasmine Hamdan (one half of Lebanon electro-duo Soapkills). The idea is that today, in Western culture, we hear about Arabs everyday – in a bad way, because of terrorism, etc – but we lack of cultural representations coming from those countries that could mix with the western culture, whereas this youth is eager to. I don't want to do world music, but a good western production with a real Arab identity."

Y.A.S.' album, Arabology was released in May 2009, with the first single, "Get It Right", following in June.

=== Uffie ===
After remixing "Pop the Glock", Mirwais became one of the producers of Uffie's album Sex Dreams and Denim Jeans, for which he produced four songs "ADD SUV", "Sex Dreams and Denim Jeans", "Illusion of Love" and "Hong Kong Garden", one of which featured Pharrell Williams ("ADD SUV") and one which featured Mattie Safer ("Illusion of Love").

=== The Retrofuture ===
Mirwais announced in early January 2021 via his Instagram page that the release of his third album The Retrofuture would take place in 2021.

The music video of the first single, "2016 – My Generation", premiered on Nowness on 19 April 2021. The music video was directed by Ludovic Houplain/ H5paris, based on an original idea by Ahmadzaï. "2016 – My Generation" was then released through all DSP platforms on 21 April 2021, making it the first single Ahmadzaï released in 20 years. He described it as "the description of a world that is already there, but in an accumulated form".

The Retrofuture is a concept album that focuses on dematerialisation and falsification. Each song is preceded by the name of a year, as in the title of "2016 – My Generation".

== Discography ==
=== Albums ===
==== Taxi Girl ====
- Seppuku (1981, Virgin France)

==== Studio albums ====
- Mirwais (1990, Productions 50 50)
- Production (2000, Naïve Records)

=== Singles ===
List of singles, with selected chart positions
Title	Year	Peak chart positions					Album
Title	Year	FRA	AUS	NLD	UK	US Dance	Album
"Cellophane"	1990	—	—	—	—	—	Mirwais
"Disco Science"	1999	—	—	—	68	—	Production
"Naïve Song"	2000	—	—	83	50	2	Production
"I Can't Wait"	2001	—	—	—	—	—	Production
"Miss You"	2002	85	92	—	—	—	Production
"2016 – My Generation"	2020	—	—	—	—	—	Non-album single

=== Film music ===
Songs that Ahmadzaï composed and wrote that are featured in films:

- Quelque chose d'organique (1996) – directed by Bertrand Bonello
- Snatch (2000) – directed by Guy Ritchie
- Die Another Day (2002) – title track of the 20th James Bond film, performed by Madonna
- Pardonnez-moi (2006) – directed by Maiwenn
- GHB (2014) – directed by Laetitia Masson

=== Remixes ===
Remixes that Ahmadzaï contributed:

- Jean Jacques Smoothie – "Two People" (2001)
- Fischerspooner – "Never Win" (2005)
- Madonna – "Isaac" (2005)
- The Slips – "Superbeat" (2007)
- Shortwave Set – "Til' 69" (2008)
- Sonny J – "Can't Stop Moving" (2008)
- Mika – "We Are Golden" (2009)
- Uffie – "Pop the Glock" (2009)
- Madonna – "It's So Cool" (2009)
- Moebius – "Light My Fire" (2009)
- Richard Ashcroft – "Hold On" (2009)
- Richard Ashcroft – "Out of My Body" (2009)

== Videography ==
- "Disco Science"
- "I Can't Wait"
- "Naïve Song"
- "V.I. (The Last Words She Said Before Leaving)"
- "Miss You"
- 2016 – My Generation
- "Barre" starring Marie-Agnès Gillot and Charlotte Dauphin
