= List of best-selling albums in Europe =

Since 1996, the IFPI have awarded Platinum Europe Awards for albums that have sold at least one million copies in Europe. Only albums released on or after 1 January 1994 are eligible for the award. This is a list of the best-selling albums in Europe, having been certified Platinum five times or more.

== List of best-selling albums in Europe of the IFPI Platinum Europe Awards ==
=== 10× Platinum ===
Year	Artist	Album	Label	Sales	Certification
1997	Celine Dion	Let's Talk About Love	Epic	10,000,000	10× Platinum
2011	Adele	21	Columbia/XL	10,000,000	10× Platinum

=== 9× Platinum ===
Year	Artist	Album	Label	Sales	Certification
1996	Celine Dion	Falling into You	Epic	9,000,000	9× Platinum
2000	The Beatles	1	Capitol	9,000,000	9× Platinum

=== 8× Platinum ===
Year	Artist	Album	Label	Sales	Certification
1994	Bon Jovi	Cross Road	Mercury	8,000,000	8× Platinum
1995	Celine Dion	D'eux	Epic	8,000,000	8× Platinum
1996	Spice Girls	Spice	Virgin	8,000,000	8× Platinum
2006	Amy Winehouse	Back to Black	Island	8,000,000	8× Platinum

=== 7× Platinum ===
Year	Artist	Album	Label	Sales	Certification
1995	Alanis Morissette	Jagged Little Pill	Maverick	7,000,000	7× Platinum
1997	Shania Twain	Come On Over	Mercury Nashville	7,000,000	7× Platinum
1998	Madonna	Ray of Light	Maverick/Warner	7,000,000	7× Platinum
1998	U2	The Best of 1980–1990	Island	7,000,000	7× Platinum
2002	Norah Jones	Come Away with Me	Blue Note	7,000,000	7× Platinum

=== 6× Platinum ===
Year	Artist	Album	Label	Sales	Certification
1997	Andrea Bocelli	Romanza	Island/Universal	6,000,000	6× Platinum
1997	The Corrs	Talk on Corners	Atlantic	6,000,000	6× Platinum
1996	Fugees	The Score	Ruffhouse/Columbia	6,000,000	6× Platinum
2000	Eminem	The Marshall Mathers LP	Aftermath	6,000,000	6× Platinum
1998	George Michael	Ladies & Gentlemen: The Best of George Michael	Sony	6,000,000	6× Platinum
2004	James Blunt	Back to Bedlam	Atlantic	6,000,000	6× Platinum
1995	Michael Jackson	HIStory: Past, Present and Future, Book I	Epic	6,000,000	6× Platinum
1995	Oasis	(What's the Story) Morning Glory?	Creation	6,000,000	6× Platinum
2004	Robbie Williams	Greatest Hits	EMI/Chrysalis	6,000,000	6× Platinum
2001	Robbie Williams	Swing When You're Winning	EMI/Chrysalis	6,000,000	6× Platinum
1999	Santana	Supernatural	Arista	6,000,000	6× Platinum

=== 5× Platinum ===
Year	Artist	Album	Label	Sales	Certification
1997	Spice Girls	Spiceworld	Virgin	5,000,000	5× Platinum
1999	Celine Dion	All the Way... A Decade of Song	Epic	5,000,000	5× Platinum
1997	Backstreet Boys	Backstreet's Back	Jive	5,000,000	5× Platinum
2000	Barry White	The Ultimate Collection	Universal	5,000,000	5× Platinum
1995	Bruce Springsteen	Greatest Hits	Columbia	5,000,000	5× Platinum
2002	Coldplay	A Rush of Blood to the Head	Capitol/Parlophone	5,000,000	5× Platinum
2005	Coldplay	X&Y	Capitol/Parlophone	5,000,000	5× Platinum
2003	Dido	Life for Rent	Arista	5,000,000	5× Platinum
1999	Dido	No Angel	Arista	5,000,000	5× Platinum
1995	Elton John	Love Songs	Rocked	5,000,000	5× Platinum
2002	Eminem	The Eminem Show	Aftermath/Shady	5,000,000	5× Platinum
1997	Eros Ramazzotti	Eros	BMG	5,000,000	5× Platinum
1996	George Michael	Older	Virgin	5,000,000	5× Platinum
2000	Madonna	Music	Maverick/Warner	5,000,000	5× Platinum
1997	James Horner	Titanic: Music from the Motion Picture	Sony	5,000,000	5× Platinum
1995	Queen	Made in Heaven	Parlophone/EMI	5,000,000	5× Platinum
1998	Phil Collins	Hits	Atlantic	5,000,000	5× Platinum
2002	Robbie Williams	Escapology	EMI/Chrysalis	5,000,000	5× Platinum
2005	Robbie Williams	Intensive Care	EMI/Chrysalis	5,000,000	5× Platinum

== By claimed sales ==
Previously, IFPI, Music & Media awarded album sales in the Pan-European sphera like The Bodyguard soundtrack which earned 7× platinum, equivalent to 7 million copies. They also reported sales amount in the case of several album's artists in their regular articles.

*Positions based on claimed sales and release year.

Year	Artist	Album	Sales	Ref.
1982	Michael Jackson	Thriller	18,000,000	
1992	Various artists/Whitney Houston	The Bodyguard	7,000,000	
1987	Michael Jackson	Bad	6,700,000	
1993	Mariah Carey	Music Box	6,000,000	
1992	ABBA	ABBA Gold	5,600,000	
1986	Madonna	True Blue	5,500,000	
1988	Tracy Chapman	Tracy Chapman	5,000,000	
1989	Madonna	Like a Prayer	5,000,000	
1991	Michael Jackson	Dangerous	5,000,000	
1993	Sheryl Crow	Tuesday Night Music Club	5,000,000	
