= Snatch (film) =

2000 film by Guy Ritchie

- Theatrical release poster
- Directed by: Guy Ritchie
- Written by: Guy Ritchie
- Produced by: Matthew Vaughn
- Starring: Benicio del Toro; Dennis Farina; Vinnie Jones; Brad Pitt; Rade Šerbedžija; Jason Statham; Alan Ford
- Cinematography: Tim Maurice-Jones
- Edited by: Jon Harris
- Music by: John Murphy
- Production company: SKA Films
- Distributed by: Columbia TriStar Film Distributors International (worldwide) (Note: Distributed under the Columbia Pictures label); Sony Pictures Releasing (US) (Note: Distributed under the Screen Gems label)
- Release dates: 23 August 2000 (premiere); 1 September 2000 (United Kingdom); 6 December 2000 (United States)
- Running time: 102 minutes
- Country: United Kingdom; United States
- Language: English
- Budget: $10 million
- Box office: $83.6 million

Snatch is a 2000 crime comedy film written and directed by Guy Ritchie, and produced by Matthew Vaughn. It stars an ensemble cast, featuring Jason Statham, Stephen Graham, Dennis Farina, Brad Pitt, Alan Ford, Benicio del Toro, Lennie James, Rade Šerbedžija, Jason Flemyng, and Vinnie Jones.

Set in the London criminal underworld, the film contains two intertwined plots: one following the search for a stolen diamond, and the other focusing on a small-time boxing promoter (Statham) who becomes embroiled with a ruthless gangster (Ford) willing to carry out severe and sadistic acts of violence.

Snatch shares themes and stylistic elements with Ritchie's first feature, Lock, Stock and Two Smoking Barrels, and includes many of the same actors. It is noted for its fast-paced editing, ensemble storytelling, and dark comedic tone.

The film was released in the United Kingdom by Columbia TriStar on 1 September 2000, and was both a critical and commercial success and has also gone on to develop a devoted cult following. A television series spin-off premiered in 2017.

== Plot ==
A gang of robbers, disguised as Orthodox Jews, steal an 84-carat (16.8 g) diamond during a heist in Antwerp. Franky Four-Fingers, the gang's leader, travels to London to see diamond dealer Doug the Head on behalf of Jewish-American organised crime figure Cousin Avi to fence the stolen diamonds. One of the robbers suggests that he visits arms dealer and ex-KGB agent Boris the Blade in London to secure a new firearm; he also separately contacts Boris, his brother, to encourage him to steal the diamond Franky is carrying.

Unlicensed boxing promoter and slot machine shop owner Turkish is forced to enter his boxer Gorgeous George in a match against one of crime boss Brick Top's fighters. When his junior partner Tommy, sent to purchase a caravan from Irish Travellers (Pikeys), is swindled, George is knocked out by bare-knuckle boxing champion Mickey O'Neil. Turkish enlists Mickey to replace George in the fight in exchange for a new caravan for Mickey's mother, while Brick Top demands that Mickey throw the fight. Turkish and Tommy are caught between Mickey's unpredictability and Brick Top's ruthlessness.

Knowing of Franky's gambling addiction, Boris asks him to place a bet for him at a local bookmaker. He then recruits small-time criminals Sol, Vinny, and Tyrone to rob the bookmakers and kidnap Franky. The robbery fails, but Franky is successfully kidnapped before being killed by Boris, who seizes the diamond. Bullet Tooth Tony, a bounty hunter hired by Avi, pursues Boris, leading to a series of car crashes and the death of Avi's bodyguard Rosebud.

To intimidate Mickey into throwing the fight, Brick Top sends men to the Traveller campsite, who burn down Mickey's mother's caravan as she is sleeping inside, killing her. Avi manages to nick the diamond from Boris, but loses the diamond to Sol and Vinny during a shootout. Tony kills Boris and injures Tyrone during the shootout. Vinny hides the diamond down his trousers and claims his dog must have swallowed it. However, Sol and Vinny are forced to give the location of the diamond when the dog is threatened with death. The dog subsequently swallows the diamond for real and runs away out a window, enraging Avi to the point that he accidentally shoots Tony (when trying to shoot the dog); following this, he gives up on the diamond and returns to America.

Mickey participates in the fixed fight, recovers after being knocked down, and knocks out his opponent, having secretly bet on himself. The Travellers ambush and massacre Brick Top and his crew. The next morning, Turkish and Tommy encounter the Travellers’ deserted camp and are briefly confronted by police looking for them. Sol and Vinny are arrested with Franky's body, while Vinny’s dog is found by Turkish and Tommy at the camp site. They take the dog to a vet, who removes the diamond it swallowed. They consult Doug, who informs Avi, prompting him to return to London to purchase the diamond.

== Cast ==
- Jason Statham as Turkish
- Stephen Graham as Tommy
- Dennis Farina as Abraham "Cousin Avi" Denovitz
- Brad Pitt as Mickey O’Neil
- Alan Ford as "Brick Top" Pulford
- Benicio del Toro as Franky "Four-Fingers"
- Robbie Gee as Vinny
- Lennie James as Sol
- Ade as Tyrone
- Rade Šerbedžija as Boris "The Blade" Yurinov
- Vinnie Jones as "Bullet Tooth" Tony
- Adam Fogerty as "Gorgeous" George
- Mike Reid as Doug "The Head"
- Nicola and Teena Collins as Alex and Susi
- Sorcha Cusack as Mrs. O'Neil
- Jason Flemyng as Darren The Pikey
- Goldie as "Bad Boy" Lincoln
- Velibor Topić as The Russian
- Sam Douglas as Rosebud
- Ewen Bremner as Mullet
- Andy Beckwith as Errol
- Dave Legeno as John
- William Beck as Neil

Besides Vinnie Jones and Adam Fogerty, a number of other professional athletes appeared in the film in minor roles, including

- Sol Campbell as Bouncer at boxing match (uncredited)
- Peter Szakacs as "Sausage" Charlie
- Andy Till as John "The Gun", a boxer who shot himself in a flashback
- Scott Welch as Horace "Good Night" Anderson, a boxer who fought Mickey in the final bout

== Production ==
Principal photography for Snatch was filmed between 18 October and 12 December 1999, in London and Buckinghamshire. A half-hour documentary of the production of the film was released featuring much of the cast along with Ritchie. Tom Delmar (Aliens, 102 Dalmatians, Velayudham) was the film's stunts choreographer.

== Release ==
=== Home media ===
The film has been released in multiple incarnations on DVD and other formats.

In July 2001, a two-disc special edition was released, containing both a full-screen and widescreen presentation of the feature. Included was an audio commentary track with director Guy Ritchie and producer Matthew Vaughn. The special features on the second disc included a making-of featurette, deleted scenes, original theatrical trailer and TV spots, text/photo galleries, storyboard comparisons, and filmographies.

In September 2002, Columbia TriStar Home Entertainment released a "deluxe collection" DVD as part of the company's Superbit series. This release contained two discs, one being the special features disc of the original DVD release, and the other a superbit version of the feature. As is the case with superbit presentations, the disc was absent of the additional features included in the original standard DVD, such as the audio commentary. The disc contained subtitles in eight different languages, including a "pikey" track, which only showed subtitles for the character Mickey.

In June 2003, a single disc setup was released, with new cover art, containing the feature disc of the special edition set. This version was simply a repackaging, omitting the second disc.

In July 2021, Sony Pictures released Snatch on the 4k Ultra HD format, which features an HDR transfer of the film along with the special features of the previously released Blu-Ray.

== Reception ==
=== Box office ===
Snatch was largely successful, both in critical response and financial gross, and has gone on to develop a devoted cult following. It opened in the UK on 1 September 2000 in 389 cinemas and grossed £2,637,364 in its opening weekend to become the number one film at the box office. Including preview grosses of £542,638, its opening weekend gross of £3.1 million set the record for an 18-certificate film, beating the record set earlier in the year by American Beauty. From a budget of $10 million, the film grossed £12,137,698 in the United Kingdom, $30.3 million in the United States and Canada, and a total of $83.6 million worldwide.

=== Critical response ===
On review aggregator Rotten Tomatoes, the film has an approval rating of 74% based on 141 reviews, with an average rating of 6.6/10. The site's critical consensus reads, "Though perhaps a case of style over substance, Guy Ritchie's second crime caper is full of snappy dialogue, dark comedy, and interesting characters." On Metacritic, the film has a score 55 out of 100, based on 31 critics, indicating "mixed or average reviews". Audiences polled by CinemaScore gave the film an average grade of "B" on an A+ to F scale.

While the film received mostly positive reviews, several reviewers commented negatively on perceived similarities in plot, character, setting, theme and style between Snatch and Ritchie's previous work, Lock, Stock and Two Smoking Barrels. In his review, Roger Ebert gave the film two out of four stars, writing that while ostensibly rooted in the London underworld, Pitt's Irish Traveller community were the most interesting element of the plot and the film's clearest predecessors were all American: Dick Tracy comics, Damon Runyon stories, and zany Marx Brothers comedies. He raised the question of "What am I to say of Snatch, Ritchie's new film, which follows the 'Lock, Stock' formula so slavishly it could be like a new arrangement of the same song?"

Writing in the New York Times Elvis Mitchell commented that "Mr. Ritchie seems to be stepping backward when he should be moving ahead". Some critics also argued that the film was lacking in depth and substance; many reviewers appeared to agree with Ebert's comment that "the movie is not boring, but it doesn't build and it doesn't arrive anywhere".

The film has gone on to develop a cult movie following, and has ranked in IMDb's top 250 rated films. In July 2025, it was one of the films voted for the "Readers' Choice" edition of The New York Times' list of "The 100 Best Movies of the 21st Century," finishing at number 209.

== Soundtrack ==
Snatch: Stealin' Stones and Breakin' Bones

Soundtrack album by various artists
- Released: 9 January 2001
- Genres: Rock pop Britpop reggae jazz rock
- Labels: Universal International; TVT

Professional ratings
Review scores
Source	Rating
Allmusic	3/5 stars

Two versions of the soundtrack album were released, one on the Universal International label with 23 tracks. However, some other tracks have been used that are not included, such as "Kosha Nostra Theme".

=== Track listing ===
1. "Diamond" – Klint
2. "Vere Iz da Storn?" – Benicio del Toro
3. "Supermoves" – Overseer
4. "Hernando's Hideaway" – The Johnston Brothers
5. "Zee Germans" – Jason Statham
6. "Golden Brown" – The Stranglers
7. "Dreadlock Holiday" – 10cc
8. "Hava Nagila" – John Murphy and Daniel L. Griffiths
9. "Avi Arrives" – Dennis Farina
10. "Cross the Track (We Better Go Back)" – Maceo & the Macks
11. "Disco Science" – Mirwais
12. "Nemesis" – Alan Ford
13. "Hot Pants (I'm Coming, Coming, I'm Coming)" – Bobby Byrd
14. "Lucky Star" – Madonna
15. "Come Again!" – Alan Ford
16. "Ghost Town" – The Specials
17. "Shrinking Balls" – Vinnie Jones
18. "Sensual Woman" – The Herbaliser
19. "Angel" – Massive Attack
20. "RRRR...Rumble" – Charles Cork
21. "Fuckin' in the Bushes" – Oasis
22. "Avi's Declaration" – Dennis Farina
23. "Don't You Just Know It" – Huey "Piano" Smith & the Clowns

== Television series ==
In April 2016, it was announced that a television series based on Snatch was in development, with the associated studios comparing the series to how the Fargo show expanded upon the original film. Created by writer, executive producer, and showrunner Alex De Rakoff, the series is based on a true story heist for gold bullion in London and was originally a Crackle exclusive release. In August 2016, Rupert Grint was named among the cast of the series, while serving as an executive producer. Dougray Scott, Ed Westwick, Luke Pasqualino, Lucien Laviscount, Phoebe Dynevor, and Juliet Aubrey feature in recurring roles.

The series had 20 episodes, running one hour-long each, and was named the most-viewed series for the streamer. The project was announced as a joint-venture production between Sony Pictures Television, Little Island Productions, and Sony Crackle Originals. The series debuted on 16 March 2017 and ran for two seasons.

== See also ==
- Hyperlink cinema – the film style of using multiple inter-connected story lines
- Shelta
- Heist film
