= Olav Basoski =

Dutch DJ/Remixer/House producer/ EDM Trainer

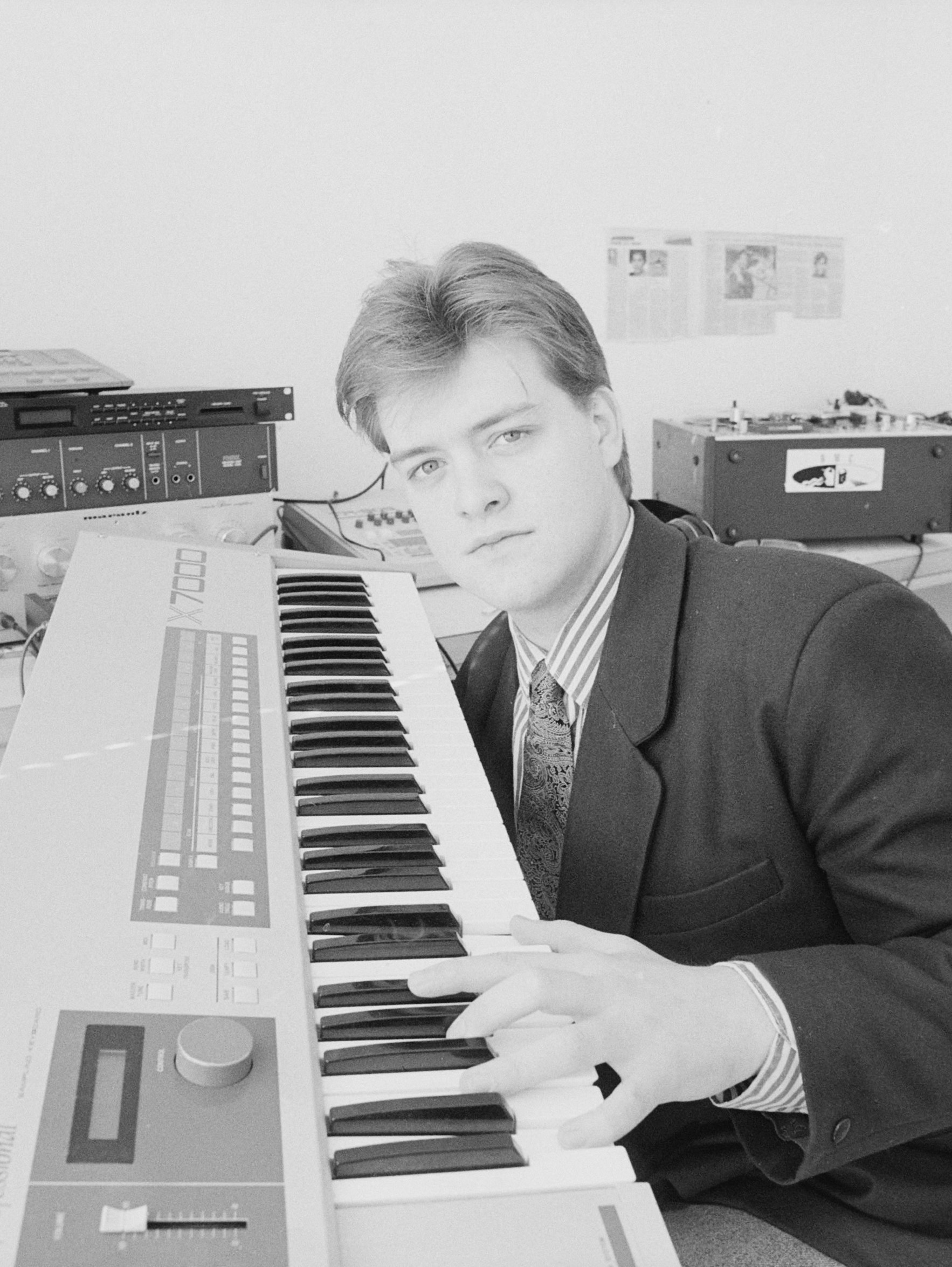

Background information
- Also known as: Sil, Ten, 6 Bells All, Bavo Likasso, World Series Of Life, Bruce Webber, Giath, Lay Rue, Les Indiscretes, Peach, Ten, The Mellow-Dee Project, Dick Wonder, Herbal 6
- Born: 14 October 1968 (age 57); Haarlem, Netherlands
- Origin: Netherlands
- Genres: Dance, House
- Occupations: DJ, Remixer, House Producer, Artist
- Years active: 1987–present
- Website: https://olavbasoski.nl

Olav Basoski (born 1968 in Haarlem, Netherlands) is a Dutch DJ, record producer and remixer. He is best known for records such as "Windows" (1991), "Don't turn your back on me" (1993), "Opium Scumbagz" (2000) and "Waterman" (2005).

== Biography ==
Originated from a musical family, he was pushed to play the violin and the piano. In the mid-80s, he was listening to the radio at night and heard a disco record, when suddenly he realised he was listening to a different record, this was his first experience of mixing records. At the age of 13, a friend of him, showed him what mixing was all about, using two turntables, which was what got him into DJing. With a loan from his parents he bought equipment to start producing. He started making mixes for a number of local Pirate radios. One day he sent in a selfmade mixtape to Ferry Maat's radioshow the Soulshow. Ferry was so enthusiastic about his mix, that from that moment on Ferry Maat started the Bond van Doorstarters (a weekly 15-minute mix item in the Soulshow).

In 1988 he made his first production, together with Sander Hoeke, under the name of Baze & Hucke with "Pitbull Terror". It responded to the current events surrounding attacks by Pit bull terriers. He gained his first success in 1991. Together with René ter Horst (Chocolate Puma) he produced the album "Windows" under the name Sil, which was popular in the clubs. Villa Ducato also proved successful. The owner of his record company also linked him to Erick E (Erick Eerdhuizen), with whom he collaborated under the name Pancake. In 1993 "Don't Turn Your Back On Me" became a popular release of this project.

In 1997 he started the "Samplitude" series. This series of EP's had a large number of releases, especially between 1997 and 2002. In 1998 he collaborated with Armin van Buuren as Wodka Wasters, with "Pass The Bottle". In the summer of 2000 he made his breakthrough in the UK with "Opium Scumbagz". This Latin-oriented record was sung by his girlfriend.

In 2005, Basoski teamed up with the British dancehall artist Michie One to record "Waterman". A remake of "Bam Bam" (originally recorded by Sister Nancy), it became a hit in the United States at both clubs and radio, where it debuted at number 22 on Billboard's Hot Dance Airplay chart in its March 27, 2006 issue. He has been featured on many compilation albums including the UK's Ministry of Sound.

Basoski has had two hits in the UK Singles Chart, "Waterman" (#45, 2005) and "Opium Scumbagz" (#56, 2000).

== Trivia ==
- Olav owes his surname to a Polish ancestor who came to the Netherlands in the time of Napoleon.
