= Che Chen =

American composer and multi-instrumentalist

Che Chen is a New York-based composer and multi-instrumentalist, best known as a central figure in the group 75 Dollar Bill.

Chen has collaborated with several influential avant-garde and improvisational musicians like Jorge Boehringer (Core of the Coalman), Rolyn Hu, Chie Mukai, Tori Kudo, Tetuzi Akiyama and Tony Conrad.

Chen grew up in a family of Taiwanese immigrants in the DC suburbs of Maryland.

In 2008, Chen began improvising regularly with fellow Brooklyn avant-rock improviser Robbie Lee, a collaboration that lasted for several years and first surfaced as the limited-release album Begin and Continue! (2008). Lee and Chen’s album The Spectrum Does (2017) was originally recorded in 2011. The album credits Lee with flute, tarogato, melodica, great bass recorder, electronics, percussion and Chen with violin, harmonium, bass recorder, tape machine, electronics, percussion.

In 2010, Lee and Chen joined Dutch minimalist composer and lutenist Jozef Van Wissem in his project Heresy of the Free Spirit, playing music described by the Chicago Reader as “a sublime mixture of country blues, old-time mountain music, and minimalist drone that features Van Wissem playing his lute with a slide.” The trio recorded an album in 2011, A Prayer for Light.

Chen was a member of the band True Primes before 75 Dollar Bill, initially a duo with drummer Rick Brown, formerly of V-Effect and Curlew. Sasha Frere-Jones described 75 Dollar Bill's music as displaying "a certain kind of formal fullness and technical freedom," which he said has helped introduce jazz to a new generation.

Chen studied Moorish music in Mauretania with Jheich Ould Chighaly in 2013.

75 Dollar Bill's first full-length album, Wooden Bag, was released in 2015 by Other Music Recording Company. Their second album, Wood/Metal/Plastic/Pattern/Rhythm/Rock, was released in 2016 on the Los Angeles-based label Thin Wrist.
