= Reiko Kudo =

Japanese musician

Reiko Kudo (工藤礼子) is a Japanese musician. In the late seventies and early eighties, she fronted the band Noise under her maiden name, Reiko Omura. Noise released one album called Tenno and played in Tokyo underground venues like Minor (alongside groups like Fushitsusha and Kousokuya). Reiko has collaborated with Maher Shalal Hash Baz, and released several solo albums. She is the partner of Tori Kudo, member of the Japanese band Maher Shalal Hash Baz

== History ==
In 1979 she formed a band and during this time, went on to explore various lineups and musical styles before solidifying themselves as a duo. Reiko took on multiple roles within the duo, writing songs, playing guitar and trumpet, and performing vocals. Tori Kudo joined her, contributing with drums and organ accompaniment.

== Discography ==
Noise

- V.A., Heaven Tapes (Heaven, 1979)
- Noise, Tenno (Engel, 1980; reissued on LP, Org, 1997; on CD, Pataphysique 1997; Alchemy, 2005)
- Inryofuen / Gyoshinkyoku + noise live '82.7.11 (Cragale, 1999, cdr)

Solo

- Fire Inside My Hat (Org, 1997)
- 夜の稲 (Yoru no ina)/rice field silently ripening in the night (Majikick/Periodic Document, 2001)
- 人 (Hito)/person (Hyotan, 2006)
- 草 (Kusa)/grass (Hyotan, 2006)
- ちりをなめる (Chiri wo nameru)/licking up dust (Hyotan, 2007)
