= Chie Mukai =

Japanese composer and musician

Chie Mukai (向井 千恵, Mukai Chie, born February 17, 1953) is a female Japanese composer and musician, best known for her underground improv-folk group Ché-SHIZU. She has been involved in improvised performance since 1975, when she participated in the East Bionic Symphonia group, a graduation project for students of Takehisa Kosugi at the Bigakko art school in Tokyo. Her primary instrument is the bowed Chinese er-hu, although she is also a vocalist, and plays piano and percussion. Every year she organizes the Perspective Emotion mixed media arts festival in Tokyo. She has been frequently collaborating with Kenya Kawaguchi, Masayoshi Urabe, Seiichi Yamamoto since 2010.

== Discography ==
=== Solo ===
- Kokyu Improvisation (胡弓インプロヴィゼイション) CD (PSF, 1990) CD
- Three pieces, solo improvisations LP (Siwa, 2000; CD, 2007)
- Crossing CDR (there, 2004)
- V.A., Somethings #1 CD (Last Visible Dog, 2007)

=== Ché-SHIZU ===
- Yakusoku wa dekinai (約束はできない) LP (zero records, 1984; CD reissue on Alchemy Records, 2001)
- V.A., Aura Music LP (zero records, 1984)
- V.A., Welcome to Dreamland LP/CD (celluloid, 1985)
- Nazareth (ナザレ) CD (PSF, 1993)
- A Journey CD (PSF, 1994)
- Live 1996 Suisho CD (PSF, 1997)
- Glimmering Star (瞬きの星) LP (Aleutian Retto, 1999; CD reissue on Alchemy Records, 2001)

=== Collaborations ===
- East Bionic Symphonia, s/t LP/cassette (Kojima, 1976)
- Takashi Kazamaki & Chie Mukai, Kaze o aruku LP (Fukyosha, 1983)
- Marginal Consort, Collective Improvisation CD (PSF, 1998)
- Chie Mukai, Jutok Kaneko, Christophe Charles, Ikuro Takahashi, Yoko Muronoi, The Planet I video/DVD (there, 2000)
- Chie Mukai & Masayoshi Urabe, Dual Anarchism LP/video (Siwa, 2002)
- Chie Mukai & Seiichi Yamamoto & Lamones Young, s/t CD (Last Visible Dog / Hospital Productions, 2003)
- Chie Mukai & Rinji Fukuoka, L'energie d'existence CD (Turtle's Dream, 2003)
- Enkidu, Hasselt CD (Turtle's Dream, 2004)
- Chie Mukai & Gary Smith, Eight+ CD (Paratactile, 2004)

=== Guest appearances ===
- Morio Agata (あがた森魚), Norimono zukan (乗物図鑑) LP (Vanity, 1981; CD reissue, Bridge, 2007)
- Hallelujahs, Niku o kuraite chikai o tateyo (肉を喰らひて誓ひをたてよ) LP (Org Records, 1986; CD reissue, PSF)
- Christoph Gallio, Cars & Variations / High Desert Songs CD (Percaso, 1994)
- Kengo Iuchi (井内賢吾), Inugami to kachiku (犬神と家畜) LP (Kubitsuri, 1995)
- Kengo Iuchi, Hanagurui no yoru cassette (Shikoku Manto, 1995)
- Kengo Iuchi, Kuon no kane no ne cassette (Vanilla, 1995)
- Nagisa ni te, On the love beach LP/CD (Org Records, 1995)
- V.A., Los Angeles Free Music Society 1973-1995：The lowest form of music CD boxset (Cortical Foundation/RRRecords, 1996)
- Kengo Iuchi/MSBR, Icht CD (alien8, 1998)
- Maher Shalal Hash Baz, From a Summer to Another Summer (An Egypt to Another Egypt) CD (Geographic)
