= Robbie Lee (musician) =

American composer and multi-instrumentalist

Robbie Lee is an American, New York-based composer and multi-instrumentalist. He specializes in improvisation, incorporating historical and early music instruments, in the intersection of experimental, classical and jazz music. Lee also releases music under the name Creature Automatic.

== Career ==
In the mid-2000s Lee was a member of Neil Hagerty’s post Royal Trux group The Howling Hex, the Dax Riggs band and Love As Laughter. Since 2008, he has been better known as part of the New York experimental scene as a member of minimalist composer and lutenist Josef van Wissem’s Heresy of the Free Spirit, the Early/Renaissance-music inspired group Seven Teares (where Lee played woodwinds and portative organ), his improvisational duo work with Che Chen, and as a session musician and collaborator. He has also recorded a duo album with avant-garde guitarist Mary Halvorson and is part of the current acoustic project of experimental dance musician Glasser.

Lee is known as an improvising saxophonist, keyboardist, guitarist, and player of several kinds of woodwinds, contemporary and historical. He has worked as a session musician and collaborated with a large number of artists across genres, including Cass McCombs, Baby Dee, Eleanor Friedberger, Cassandra Jenkins, !!!, JFDR, Lights/Cliffie Swan, August Wells, Lia Ices, Brightblack Morning Light, Fraufraulein, Chris Brokaw, Lea Bertucci (for a Pauline Oliveros project), Talibam!, Brian Chase (drummer for Yeah Yeah Yeahs and drone musician) and Citay's Ezra Feinberg.

In 2008, Lee began improvising regularly with fellow Brooklyn avant-rock improviser Che Chen, a collaboration that lasted for several years and first surfaced as the limited-release album Begin and Continue! (2008). Lee and Chen’s album The Spectrum Does (2017) was originally recorded in 2011. The album credits Lee with flute, tarogato, melodica, great bass recorder, electronics, percussion and Chen with violin, harmonium, bass recorder, tape machine, electronics, percussion.

In 2010, Lee and Chen joined Dutch minimalist composer and lutenist Jozef Van Wissem in his project Heresy of the Free Spirit, playing music described by the Chicago Reader as “a sublime mixture of country blues, old-time mountain music, and minimalist drone that features Van Wissem playing his lute with a slide.” The trio recorded an album in 2011, A Prayer for Light. Lee also mixed and mastered van Wissem's collaboration with film director Jim Jarmusch, Concerning the Entrance into Eternity (2012). The Incunabulum Records compilation New Music for Old Instruments, which also includes a Heresy of the Free Spirit track featuring singing by Japanese avant-garde musician Keiji Haino.

Creature Automatic is the name of Lee's song-based project. Creature Automatic released the album Dust Clouds May Exist in 2015. Record Collector described Dust Clouds May Exist as “a collection of rough diamonds that veers wildly from genre to genre.”

The trio album Opalescence, with German flutist Norbert Rodenkirchen (who also plays in early-music group Sequentia) and bassist James Ilgenfritz, released in 2018. Lee plays contrabass recorder, chalumeau, gemshorn, sopranino saxophone, Beaudin and medieval flutes, Kingma-system quarter-tone flute, and Kotato F flute.

His duo work with Mary Halvorson combines her vintage guitar sound with Lee's eight-key Baroque flute. Seed Triangular, Lee's album with Mary Halvorson, was released by New Amsterdam Recordings in 2018. The New York Times described Lee as "a versatile musician with a passion for exhuming old American instruments."

In 2022, Lee released Winds Bells Falls, a collaboration with New York composer and improviser Lea Bertucci. According to a Pitchfork reviewer, the album features Bertucci "record[ing] and contort[ing] Lee’s improvisations on celeste, chimes, baroque flute, and contrabass recorder in real time, while Lee responds to the sound of his own playing swirling and dissolving in front of his ears." Pitchfork described Winds Bells Falls as "often bright and gleaming, like light glinting in a funhouse mirror."

== Discography ==
- Sleep Memory (2006)
- Begin and Continue! (with Che Chen) (2008)
- Dust Clouds May Exist (as Creature Automatic) (2015)
- The Spectrum Does (with Che Chen) (2017)
- Opalescence (with Norbert Rodenkirchen and James Ilgenfritz) (2018)
- Seed Triangular (with Mary Halvorson) (2018)
- Winds Bells Falls (with Lea Bertucci) (2022)

=== As band member ===
- XI, The Howling Hex (2007)
- We Sing Only of Love and Blood, Dax Riggs (2007)
- Holy, Love As Laughter (2008)
- Say Goodnight to the World, Dax Riggs (2010)
- A Prayer for Light, Heresy of the Free Spirit (2011)
- New Music for Old Instruments, v/a (2012)
- Power Ballads, Seven Teares (2013)
