= Masayoshi Urabe =

Japanese musician (born 1965)

Masayoshi Urabe live at the Instal festival, Glasgow, 2004

Masayoshi Urabe (浦邊 雅祥, Urabe Masayoshi, born 1965) is a Japanese musician, best known for his intensely physical style of free improvisation on the alto saxophone and his deployment of long, laden silences. He has sometimes been compared to the late Japanese free jazz altoist Kaoru Abe.
He has played with many underground musicians in Japan, including Chie Mukai (Ché-SHIZU), Kan Mikami (Sanjah), Hiroshi Hasegawa (Astro, C.C.C.C.), Junko (Hijokaidan) and the psychedelic rock group Kousokuya. Recently he formed the group Sanjah, with folk singer Kan Mikami and drummer Toshi Ishizuka. He also performs with the Paris-based dancer Yukiko Nakamura.

== Discography ==
- Solo
  - Solo LP/CD (PSF, 1996)
  - Ju A Brute 2LP (no label, 2000)
  - Rock n Roll Breathing video (There, 2001)
  - Urklang CD (Tiliqua, 2001)
  - Soingyokusaiseyo LP (Elevage de Poussiere, 2002)
  - Ware wa seidai no kyojo zo CD (PSF, 2003)
  - V.A., Amaterasu 2CD (Fractal, 2003)
  - V.A., Undecided CD (PSF, 2004)
  - V.A., Somethings #1 CD (Last Visible Dog, 2007)
  - 真夏の旗 [The Flag of Midsummer] CD (PSF, 2008)
- Collaborations
  - Nazareth CD w/Ché-SHIZU (PSF, 1993)
  - The Dark Spot CD w/Kousokuya (PSF, 1997)
  - Duo 1988 LP w/Hiroshi Hasegawa (Siwa, 1999)
  - Masayoshi Urabe & Gary Smith CD w/Gary Smith (Paratactile, 2001)
  - Dual Anarchism LP w/Chie Mukai (Siwa, 2002)
  - Dual Anarchism video w/Chie Mukai (There, 2002)
  - Chi no kioku video w/Yuji Itsumi (PSF, 2003)
  - V.A., PSF & Alchemy 20th Anniversary Live CD w/Junko (PSF, 2005)
  - Musen/Izu CD w/Sanjah (PSF, 2006)
- Samples
  - Urabe Breathes on Cory Allen's album Gesemi Tropisms (Bremsstrahlung, 2005)
