= The Dead Don't Die (soundtrack) =

The Dead Don't Die (Original Score)

Film score by SQÜRL
- Released: June 14, 2019
- Studio: Boombox Magnetica Studios, Washington; Deep Space Recording, Brooklyn, New York
- Genre: Film score
- Length: 34:43
- Label: Back Lot Music
- Producer: Jim Jarmusch; Jonathan Kreinik

The Dead Don't Die (Original Score) is the film score to the 2019 film The Dead Don't Die directed by Jim Jarmusch, featuring an ensemble cast including Bill Murray, Adam Driver, Chloë Sevigny, Steve Buscemi, Tilda Swinton, Tom Waits, Danny Glover, Caleb Landry Jones, Rosie Perez, Iggy Pop, Carol Kane, RZA, Austin Butler and Selena Gomez. The album featured original score composed by Jarmusch's band SQÜRL and dialogues from the film and released through Back Lot Music on June 14, 2019.

== Development ==
Jarmusch's band SQÜRL which consisted of himself and Carter Logan, composed the original musical score. The band which composed Only Lovers Left Alive (2013) with Jozef van Wissem intended to score the film solely from the inception considering it a "giant asterisk next to that". The theme song for the film performed by Sturgill Simpson was part of the script but rescinded it with their plans to score music had them in their mind even though they did not start working on the music until production wrapped.

According to Logan, he considered it to be a tough film as the production completed in a quick succession and also added more elements such as cast, extras, special effects, make up, stunts and visual effects. However, for the music, they wrote rough sketches and did not lean on temp tracks. The rough demos were produced using guitars and synthesizers. They went ahead with a darker stuff, which Jarmusch recalled Thurston Moore's comment on the band as "molten, meditation-core". Some of their inspirations included references from John Carpenter, Ennio Morricone, Krzysztof Komeda and Bernard Herrmann, along with European influences from Tangerine Dream, which were set as the parameter for composing and through recording, Jarmusch and Logan shared their ideas back-and-forth building them through the production, editing and the final mix.

Unlike scoring it to picture, they composed the pieces based on their musical ideas and then edited it to fit into the picture, with the help of editor Affonso Gonçalves. Throughout the editing process, Jarmusch come every week and have a spotting session to include music in specific sequences.

== Release ==
The score album was released through Back Lot Music on June 14, 2019, in digital platforms and CDs. It was further released in LPs through Sacred Bones Records on October 4, 2019.

== Reception ==
The Film Scorer wrote, "With The Dead Don't Die, Sqürl composed a score that is experimental and incredibly effective at both coexisting with and modifying the film." Ines Lalonde of Mxdwn Music wrote, "This doesn't take away from the score being quite powerful and evocative. There's a lot of undertones that ride on danger, and Sqürl's score proves that they really enjoy experimenting with sound." Todd McCarthy of The Hollywood Reporter wrote, "Typically for Jarmusch, the songs, led by the title tune, and score are outstanding, enlivening nearly every scene." Tim Grierson of Screen International wrote, "With Jarmusch's drone-rock band SQÜRL providing the ambient, mournful score, The Dead Don't Die places the viewer in an environment without hope or escape."

== Track listing ==
No.	Title	Actor(s)	Length
1.	"Dialogue 1"	Adam Driver; Bill Murray; Chloe Sevigny	0:16
2.	"The Dead Just Don't Wanna Die Today"		5:00
3.	"Dialogue 2"	Larry Fessenden	0:31
4.	"Replacement Sky"		2:55
5.	"Dialogue 3"	Sevigny; Driver	0:25
6.	"This Is All Gonna End Badly"		3:54
7.	"Dialogue 4"	Selena Gomez; Rosie Perez; Austin Butler; Luka Sabbat	0:30
8.	"Malignant Wave of Doom"		3:51
9.	"Dialogue 5"	Caleb Landry Jones	0:31
10.	"Toxic Moon"		4:32
11.	"Dialogue 6"	Tilda Swinton; Murray	0:13
12.	"Pulsating Elevator of Light"		6:36
13.	"Dialogue 7"	Sevigny; Murray; Driver	0:27
14.	"The Dead Don't Die"		4:19
15.	"Dialogue 8"	Tom Waits	0:35

== Release history ==
Release history and formats for The Dead Don't Die (Original Score)
Region	Date	Format(s)	Label(s)	Ref.
Various	June 14, 2019	Digital download; streaming	Back Lot Music	
Various	October 4, 2019	LP	Sacred Bones Records	
