= 75 Dollar Bill =

- Origin: New York City
- Years active: 2012–present
- Labels: Other Music, Thin Wrist
- Members: Che Chen; Rick Brown
- Website: 75dollarbill.bandcamp.com

75 Dollar Bill is a musical duo formed in New York City in 2012. Its members are Che Chen (guitar), formerly of True Primes, and Rick Brown (drums), formerly of V-Effect and Curlew. Sasha Frere-Jones described their music as displaying "a certain kind of formal fullness and technical freedom," which he said has helped introduce jazz to a new generation. Other critics have noted that their music shows signs of Mauritanian influences, because Chen studied Moorish music in Mauritania with Jheich Ould Chighaly in 2013. Their first full-length album, Wooden Bag, was released in 2015 by Other Music Recording Company. Their second album, Wood/Metal/Plastic/Pattern/Rhythm/Rock, was released in 2016 on the Los Angeles-based label Thin Wrist.

For their 2019 album, I Was Real, they expanded to a larger ensemble of players, which the Guardian described as "adding yet more depth to their placeless, gripping grooves". The Wire named I Was Real the number one album on their year end list for 2019. Since then they have self-released a series of live recordings through Bandcamp, including Power Failures and the Social Music at Troost series.

== Discography ==
- Wooden Bag (2015, Other Music)
- Wood/Metal/Plastic/Pattern/Rhythm/Rock (2016, Thin Wrist)
- I Was Real (2019, Thin Wrist)
- Live at Tubby's (2020, Grapefruit)
