= Fushitsusha (1991 album) =

Live album by Fushitsusha
- Released: 1991
- Recorded: 1991
- Genre: Psychedelic rock
- Length: 146:56
- Label: P.S.F. Records
- Producer: Hideo Ikeezumi

Fushitsusha chronology
1st (1991)	Fushitsusha (1991)	Allegorical Misunderstanding (1994)

Fushitsusha (also known as 2nd or Live 2) is a live album by the band Fushitsusha. It was released in 1991 by P.S.F. Records.

== Reception ==
Professional ratings
Review scores
Source	Rating
AllMusic	4.5/5 stars

In a review for AllMusic, John Dougan called the album "Perhaps the best recording of Haino with Fushitsusha," and wrote: "This is careening, no-holds-barred improvisatory jazz-rock, part Sonny Sharrock, part heavy metal thunder, part '60s garage-rock rant. Haino's playing is jaw-droppingly great, making this a free music masterpiece."

Jon Dale of Red Bull Music Academy stated that the album "gracefully dismantles rock's archetypes with simple rhythmic conceits, traditional instrumental hierarchies and orderly, predictable rock dynamics," and called Haino's playing "incendiary, splitting off into vectors of no-mind, pre-syntactical gush."

Writing for Burning Ambulance, Phil Freeman described the album as "mind-roasting," and called the band "a power trio that made an unholy loud noise, sometimes blasting away at punk-rock tempos and other times eschewing steady rhythm entirely, creating free spaces into which Haino hurled massive, wall-like power chords and jagged solos that sounded like Neil Young having a fatal aneurysm while onstage with Crazy Horse."

The Chicago Reader's Monica Kendrick noted that the album "comes closest to capturing the range of forms Fushitsusha's assault can take, from sparse and lovely song to crushing metablues to superheavy-metal power jam."

== Track listing ==
Disk 1
No.	Title	Length
1.	"Untitled"	10:28
2.	"Untitled"	14:42
3.	"Untitled"	11:57
4.	"Untitled"	13:46
5.	"Untitled"	12:23
6.	"Untitled"	9:34

Disk 2
No.	Title	Length
1.	"Untitled"	16:37
2.	"Untitled"	9:04
3.	"Untitled"	6:17
4.	"Untitled"	6:49
5.	"Untitled"	9:41
6.	"Untitled"	11:25
7.	"Untitled"	14:13

== Personnel ==
Fushitsusha

- Keiji Haino: guitar, vocals
- Yasushi Ozawa: bass
- Jun Kosugi: drums

Technical personnel

- Hideo Ikeezumi: production
