= East Bionic Symphonia =

Japanese musical group

East Bionic Symphonia were a group of improvisers and artists who studied together under Takehisa Kosugi at the Bigakko artschool in Tokyo in the mid-1970s. As a graduation project they recorded an album of free improvisation that was edited by Kosugi and released on the ALM Records label in 1976. Several of the members went on to have careers in underground music and the visual arts. The remnants of the group reconvened in 1997 under the name Marginal Consort and continue to play annually.
The original members were Kazuo Imai, Kaoru Okabe, Yasushi Ozawa, Tomonao Koshikawa, Hiroshi Shii, Masami Tada, Tatsuo Hattori, Kazuaki Hamada, Masaharu Minegishi, & Chie Mukai.

== Discography ==
East Bionic Symphonia LP/cassette (ALM Records, 1976)
