= Silver Haze =

Silver Haze may refer to:

- Silver Haze (film), a 2023 drama film
- Silver Haze, a strain of cannabis
- Silver Haze, a 1999 album by the Quill
- Silver Haze (Aye Nako album), 2017 album
- Silver Haze (Sqürl album), 2023 album
