= Marginal Consort =

Marginal Consort is a Japanese collective/free improvisation group made of sound and visual artists, who have played one concert annually since 1997. The group originally grew out of the East Bionic Symphonia, who recorded one album in 1976. The members are Kazuo Imai (今井和雄), Yasushi Ozawa (小沢靖) (also a member of Fushitsusha), Tomonao Koshikawa (越川知尚), Kei Shii (椎啓), and Masami Tada (多田正美). Chie Mukai participated in the first two concerts, but no longer plays with the group.

== Discography ==
- East Bionic Symphonia (Kojima, 1976)
- Collective Improvisation (PSF, 1998)
- Marginal Consort 4CD (Improvised Music from Japan, 2007)
- Glasgow 17th Feb 2008 4LP (PAN, 2013)
