= Allegorical Misunderstanding =

Studio album by Fushitsusha
- Released: 1993
- Recorded: 1992
- Length: 47:43
- Label: Avant
- Producer: John Zorn

Fushitsusha chronology
Fushitsusha (1991)	Allegorical Misunderstanding (1993)	Pathétique (1994)

Allegorical Misunderstanding is a 1993 album by the band Fushitsusha. The album was produced by John Zorn and was the first studio album from the band.

== Critical reception ==
Professional ratings
Review scores
Source	Rating
AllMusic	4.5/5 stars

In a review for AllMusic, John Dougan called the album "a reserved outing that blends repetitive chords with an arrhythmic rhythm section," and noted that the musicians often "successfully experiment with subtle repetition in what turn out to be almost mantra-like improvised passages."

John Corbett of the Chicago Reader wrote that "the Fushitsusha of Allegorical Misunderstanding (Avant) is the sparer, less slashing version, in which [guitarist Keiji] Haino sometimes acquires the scattershot phrasing of James 'Blood' Ulmer."

A writer for Arcane Candy stated that, despite "the absence of Haino's massive realms of guitar effects and distortion," the album "still maintains the quintessential air of cyclical intensity of all Fushitsusha efforts."

== Track listing ==
1. "Magic I" - 2:38
2. "Magic II" - 8:39
3. "Magic III" - 1:08
4. "Magic IV" - 3:29
5. "Magic V" - 5:31
6. "Magic VI" - 4:00
7. "Magic VII" - 3:25
8. "Magic VIII" - 2:26
9. "Magic IX" - 13:43
10. "Magic X" - 2:45

== Notes ==
The album was re-released in 1999 under the same label.

== Personnel ==
- Keiji Haino – guitar, vocals
- Yasushi Ozawa – bass
- Jun Kosugi – drums
