= The Mystery of Heaven =

Studio album by Jozef van Wissem & Jim Jarmusch
- Released: November 13, 2012
- Genre: Classical, minimal, drone, experimental folk, post-rock
- Length: 48:01
- Label: Sacred Bones Records

Jozef van Wissem & Jim Jarmusch chronology
Concerning the Entrance into Eternity (2012)	The Mystery of Heaven (2012)

Professional ratings
Review scores
Source	Rating
AllMusic	4/5 stars
Consequence of Sound	3.5/5 stars
Dusted Magazine	favorable
Filter	84%
Pitchfork Media	6.4/10

The Mystery of Heaven is the second collaborative album by Jozef van Wissem & Jim Jarmusch. It was released on Sacred Bones Records in 2012.

The track "The More She Burns the More Beautifully She Glows" features a guest appearance from actress Tilda Swinton.

== Reception ==
Bob Boilen of NPR said: "The album is gritty but not in-your-face; it's pretty, but there's nothing delicate about it. It's a rich, appropriately cinematic sound."

== Track listing ==
No.	Title	Length
1.	"Etimasia"	3:13
2.	"Flowing Light of the Godhead"	11:03
3.	"The Mystery of Heaven (Long Version)"	9:57
4.	"The More She Burns the More Beautiful She Glows" (featuring Tilda Swinton)	10:56
5.	"Etimasia (Reprise)"	1:44
6.	"Flowing Light of the Godhead (Eternal Sun)"	11:08
