= LSD March =

Japanese psychedelic rock band

LSD March is a Japanese psychedelic rock group, hailing from the city of Himeji, led by singer and guitarist Shinsuke Michishita. The group is named after a track by krautrock group Guru Guru. Michishita has also played with Magura Mozart and Doodles.

In 2009, Michishita began the psych-folk group, Kasumi Trio. The other members are Ikuro Takahashi (from Fushitsusha, Nagisa ni te) and Takashi Ueno.

== Selected discography ==
Albums

- 1997-2001 at Mushroom CD (Gyuune Cassette, 2002)
- Totsuzen honno no gotoku (突然炎のごとく) LP, (White Elephant, 2002; CD reissue, Last Visible Dog, 2004)
- Kanashimino bishonen LP (HP Cycle, 2004)
- Shindara jigoku LP (Siwa, 2004)
- LSD March Live CD (Archive, 2006)
- Empty Rubious Red CD (White Elephant; reissue, Archive 2006 CD, Tequila Sunrise 2007 LP)
- Tour CDr (White Elephant 2007)
- Constellation Of Tragedy CD (Important Records, 2007)
- Nikutai No Tubomi 2CD (Beta-lactam Ring Records, 2007)
- Under Milk Wood CD (Important Records, 2009)
- Uretakumo Nakunarutorika (Beta-lactam Ring Records, 2009)
- Untitled Split-LP with Mama Baer (DVR-HGA, 2012)

Compilations

- Mushroom A Go Go CD (Gyuune Cassette, 1998)
- The Night Gallery CD (Alchemy Records, 2003)
- Million Tongues Festival CD (Bastet, 2004)
- Catch 35 CD (Gyuune Cassette, 2004)
