= Concerning the Entrance into Eternity =

Studio album by Jozef van Wissem and Jim Jarmusch
- Released: February 28, 2012
- Genres: Classical, minimal, experimental folk
- Length: 41:09
- Label: Important Records

Jozef van Wissem and Jim Jarmusch chronology
Concerning the Entrance into Eternity (2012)	The Mystery of Heaven (2012)

Professional ratings
Review scores
Source	Rating
Brainwashed	favorable
Dusted Magazine	favorable
Pitchfork Media	7.3/10
Spin	7/10

Concerning the Entrance into Eternity is the first collaborative album by Jozef van Wissem and Jim Jarmusch. It was released on Important Records in 2012.

A music video was created for the track "The Sun of the Natural World Is Pure Fire." It was directed by Diego Barrera.

== Reception ==
Marc Masters of Pitchfork Media gave the album a 7.3 out of 10, describing it as "the first full release Van Wissem has made with an actual punk rocker."

== Track listing ==
No.	Title	Length
1.	"Apokatastasis (Restoration)"	10:00
2.	"Concerning the Entrance into Eternity"	7:14
3.	"Continuation of the Last Judgement"	6:36
4.	"The Sun of the Natural World Is Pure Fire"	9:20
5.	"He Is Hanging by His Shiny Arms, His Heart an Open Wound with Love"	4:04
