= Love as Laughter =

American indie rock band

Love As Laughter
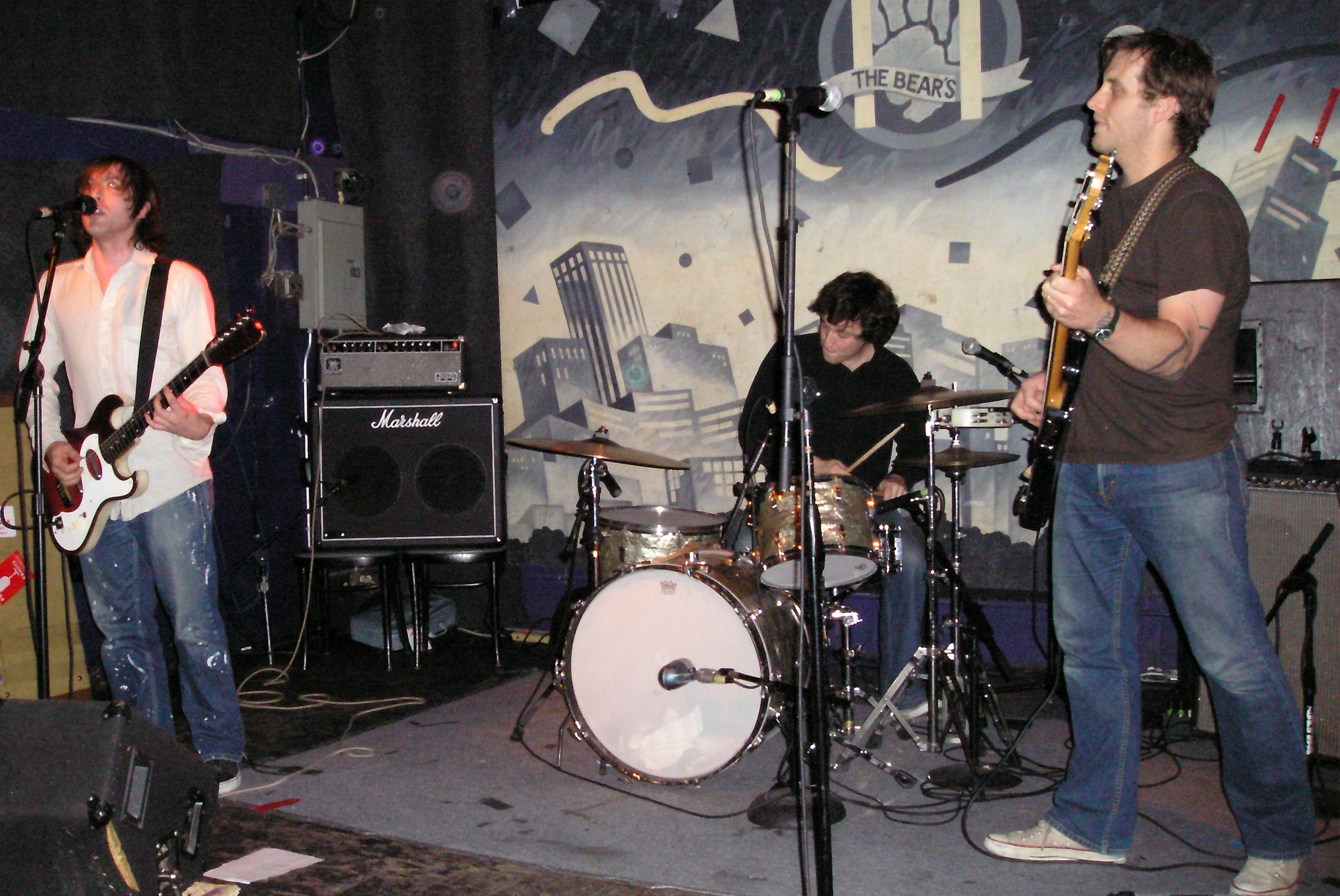

Background information
- Origin: Olympia, Washington, United States
- Genre: Indie rock
- Years active: 1994–2020
- Labels: Sub Pop; K; Glacial Pace
- Past members: Sam Jayne; Brandon Angle; Ivan Berko; Jessica Espeleta; Nic Gonzales; Andy Macleod; Robbie Lee; Dave Schneider; Leslie Hardy
- Website: loveaslaughter.bandcamp.com

Love as Laughter was an American indie rock band from Olympia, Washington. The band was formed in 1994 by vocalist and guitarist Sam Jayne as a solo project following the break-up of his previous band, Lync. In 2008, the band signed with Isaac Brock's label Glacial Pace and released the album Holy. At the time, the band featured Jayne, Ivan Berko on bass, Zeke Howard on drums, Andy Macleod on guitar and Robbie Lee on keyboards. Jayne was found dead on December 15, 2020, at the age of 46.

== Sam Jayne's death ==
Sam Jayne was found unresponsive lying in the back of his car by New York City Police Department about a week after he was reported missing. He was pronounced dead at the scene. Preliminary research from NYPD showed no "signs of criminality." His family confirmed that his cause of death was a result of heart-related, "undiagnosed health conditions," and that he died peacefully while curled up in his car the night before a planned cross-country drive to visit friends around the holidays.

== Discography ==
=== Studio albums ===
- The Greks Bring Gifts (1996)
- #1 USA (1997)
- Destination 2000 (1999)
- Sea to Shining Sea (2001)
- Laughter's Fifth (2005)
- Holy (2008)

=== EPs ===
- Trademark of Quality (2007)
- Holy E.P. (2008)
- Holiday Party Pack (2012)
- Greks II: Slight Return (2013)

=== Singles ===
- Love As Laughter / Ringfinger - Love As Laughter and Ringfinger (1995)
- Do You Experience Alien Boredom? (1995)
- Love As Laughter / The Seductive - Tour Split (1996)
- I'm A Bee (1996)
- Planet Of Children (1996)
- Fever (1996)
- Nude 'Hos (1998)
- My Case (2000)
- Looks Like This City's Broken (2000)
- Temptation Island (2001)
- Timers (2010)
- Lazy Soldier B/W Oasis (2015)
- Monique b/w the One Around for Years (2016)
- Wolves (2016)
- UK Joint (2020)

=== Other releases and appearances ===
- 180° South: Conquerors of the Useless Soundtrack (2010)

=== Sam Jayne solo ===
- The "Natural" Sessions
- The Super Natural Sessions
