= Fushitsusha (1989 album) =

Live album by Fushitsusha
- Released: July 24, 1989
- Recorded: 1989
- Genre: Psychedelic rock
- Length: 97:00
- Label: P.S.F.

Fushitsusha chronology
| Fushitsusha (1989) | Fushitsusha (1991) |

Fushitsusha (also known as Live 1 or 1st) is the debut live album of the Japanese band Fushitsusha, released in 1989 through P.S.F. Records.

== Reception ==
Professional ratings
Review scores
| Source | Rating |
|---|---|
| AllMusic | 4.5/5 stars |

In a review for AllMusic, Phil Freeman called the recording "one of the most important albums in the history of Japanese underground rock, absolutely essential."

Jon Dale of Red Bull Music Academy wrote: "at this point, Fushitsusha are taking on the freedoms implicit in those world-wrecking Dylan & The Hawks shows, dizzyingly flexible in their attack yet always grounded by the ne plus ultra of rock movement." He stated: "this is a great reminder of just how potent a rock performer Haino can be, and how brightly he shines when backed by sympathetic musicians."

Writing for The Quietus, Tristan Bath described the album as "a colossus of a masterpiece," and commented: "The music's some of the most accessible and musically direct Haino ever made, even harbouring some bouncy blues grooves."

== Track listing ==
Side one
| No. | Title | Length |
|---|---|---|
| 1. | "あっち" (Acchi) | 12:32 |
| 2. | "暗号" (Angō) | 10:21 |

Side two
| No. | Title | Length |
|---|---|---|
| 1. | "好きにすればいい" (Suki ni Sureba Ii) | 11:38 |
| 2. | "届かない" (Todokanai) | 10:27 |

Side three
| No. | Title | Length |
|---|---|---|
| 1. | "ふわふわ" (Fuwafuwa) | 8:04 |
| 2. | "なったんじゃない" (Nattanjanai) | 7:46 |
| 3. | "迷子" (Maigo) | 10:03 |

Side four
| No. | Title | Length |
|---|---|---|
| 1. | "ここ" (Koko) | 26:06 |

== Personnel ==
Fushitsusha

- Akui – drums
- Keiji Haino – guitar, vocals
- Maki Miura – guitar
- Seijiro Murayama – drums
- Yasushi Ozawa – bass guitar
