= Yasushi Ozawa =

Japanese musician and sound engineer

Yasushi Ozawa (小沢 靖, Ozawa Yasushi) (1958 – February 2, 2008) was a Japanese musician and sound engineer, best known as the bassist in Keiji Haino's rock group Fushitsusha. He was also a member of the free improvisation group Marginal Consort, and in the past he played with East Bionic Symphonia and Machine-Gun Tango (with Tori Kudo).

== Discography ==
- East Bionic Symphonia (Kojima, 1976)
- V.A., Aiyoku jinmin juji gekijo (Pinakotheca, 1980)
- Collective Improvisation (PSF, 1998)
- Marginal Consort 4CD (Improvised Music from Japan, 2007)
- Early Works of Satoshi Sonoda 1977→1978 / Memories of Yasushi Ozawa (PSF, 2009)

with Fushitsusha

- Untitled (PSF, 1989)
- Untitled (PSF, 1991)
- Allegorical Misunderstanding (Avant, 1993)
- Pathetique [also known as Hisou] (PSF, 1994)
- The Caution Appears (Les Disques de soleil, 1995)
- Purple Trap: The Wound That Was Given Birth To Must Be Bigger Than The Wound That Gave Birth (Blast First, 1996)
- A Death Never To Be Complete (Tokuma, 1997)
- The Time is Nigh (Tokuma, 1997)
- Gold Blood (Charnel, 1998)
- A Little Longer Thus (Tokuma, 1998)
- The Wisdom Prepared (Tokuma, 1998)
- Withdrawe, This Sable Disclosure ere Devot'd (Victo, 1998)
- I Saw It! That Which Before I Could Only Sense (Paratactile, 2000)
- Origin's Hesitation (PSF, 2001)
