= Kazuo Imai =

Japanese musician (born 1955)

Kazuo Imai (今井 和雄, Imai Kazuo; born September 24, 1955) is a Tokyo-based guitarist who plays in a rigorous and original free improvisation idiom. His music joins the rigour and texture of contemporary classical with the passion of free jazz. He has played with many Western and Japanese improvisers, including Lee Konitz, Barre Phillips, Arthur Doyle, Han Bennink, Irene Schweizer, Shuichi Chino, Tetsu Saitoh and Kazue Sawai. In addition to playing solo and in collaborations, Imai is also a member of the important collective improvisation group Marginal Consort. As well as guitar, Imai also plays viola da gamba.

== History ==
Born in Kawasaki in 1955, Imai studied with two of post-war Japan's leading musical iconoclasts, Takehisa Kosugi and Masayuki Takayanagi. Imai studied under Kosugi at the Bigakko art school from 1975, and as a graduation project he participated in the East Bionic Symphonia collective improvisation performance and recording. Kosugi invited Imai to play with his well-known mixed media group Taj Mahal Travellers, which he did from 1975 to 1977. Imai also studied under guitar virtuoso Masayuki Takayanagi, and was the only one of Takayanagi's private students to ever graduate. Imai played for several months with Takayanagi's New Directions group in 1976.

Imai withdrew from live performance completely between 1985 and 1991. When he returned it was primarily as a solo performer, at a still ongoing series of self-promoted concerts entitled "Solo Works". From this time he began releasing solo and duo records, and performing with Western musicians who visited Japan, including Lee Konitz, Barre Phillips and Arthur Doyle.

In 1997, Imai was instrumental in reforming East Bionic Symphonia, under the new name of Marginal Consort. The group continue to play one concert each year.

== Discography ==
Solo

- How Will We Change? Solo Improvised Works (PSF, 1995)
- Far and Wee (PSF, 2004)
- the seasons ill (hitorri, 2017)

Duos, groups

- East Bionic Symphonia (ALM, 1976)
- Marginal Consort: Collective Improvisation (PSF, 1998)
- Play 'em as They Fall, w/ Barre Phillips (Station Kids, 1999)
- Across the Desert, w/ Han Bennink (Improvised Music from Japan, 2003)
- 001111, w/ Shuichi Chino (PSF, 2004)
- Une Chance pour l'Ombre, w/Kazue Sawai, Michel Doneda, Le Quan Ninh, Tetsu Saitoh (Victo, 2004)
- Orbit 1, w/ Tetsu Saitoh & Michel Doneda (Travessia, 2006)
- Marginal Consort, w/ Marginal Consort (Improvised Music From Japan, 2007)

With other artists

- Lee Konitz, Unaccompanied Live in Yokohama (PSF, 1997)
- Otomo Yoshihide, Yoshihide Otomo Plays the Music of Takeo Yamashita (P-Vine, 1999)
- Yuji Itsumi, Chi no kioku video (PSF, 2003)

Compilations

- Deluxe Improvisation Series, Vol. 1: 2000 (ASE, 2001)
- Deluxe Improvisation Series, Vol. 2: 2001 Part 1 (ASE, 2001)
- Improvised Music from Japan Presents Improvised Music from Japan 10 cd set (IMFJ, 2001)
- Deluxe Improvisation Festival 2001: Day Two (ASE, 2002)
- Festival Beyond Innocence: A Brief History in 67 Chapters 4-CD set (FBI, 2003)
- Free Will (PSF, 2003)
- Undecided: JMSA Presents Wave from Free Music (PSF, 2004)
- PSF & Alchemy: 20th Anniversary Live (PSF, 2005)
