= Gary Smith (guitarist) =

British guitarist & composer

Gary Smith is a British avant-garde guitarist, improviser and composer. He is known for developing dense extended techniques on electric guitar. Gary Smith has released close to 20 albums in solo, group and live settings with Shoji Hano, Rhys Chatham, John Stevens, Hugh Hopper, Masayoshi Urabe, Chie Mukai, Aufgehoben, No Process, and Bill Fay.

== Selected discography ==
- Gary Smith: Rhythm Guitar (Impetus) 1991
- Gary Smith: Stereo (Chronoscope) 1996
- Gary Smith & John Stevens: S/T (Ecstatic Peace) 1996
- Gary Smith: Forgotten Room With Chairs (Fmr) 1998
- Mass: Mass (Paratactile) 1998
- Mass: From Zero (Paratactile) 1998
- Powerfield: Electronic/Electric/Electronic (Paratactile) 1999
- Glass Cage: Glass Cage (Paratactile) 2001
- Aufgehoben No Process Vs Gary Smith: Magnetic Mountain (Junior Meat) 2001
- Masayoshi Urabe & Gary Smith: S/T (Paratactile) 2001
- Aufgehoben: Anno Fauve (Riot Season) 2004
- Gary Smith: Future Thought Reveal 2003 (Paratactile) 2003
- Mass: Mixed Media (Paratactile) 2003
- Mukai Chie & Gary Smith: Eight+ (Paratactile) 2005
- Bill Fay Group: Tomorrow Tomorrow and Tomorrow (Durtro) 2005
- Gary Smith: Supertexture (Sijis) 2006
