= Kamisunagawa, Hokkaido =

Kamisunagawa 上砂川町
- Town
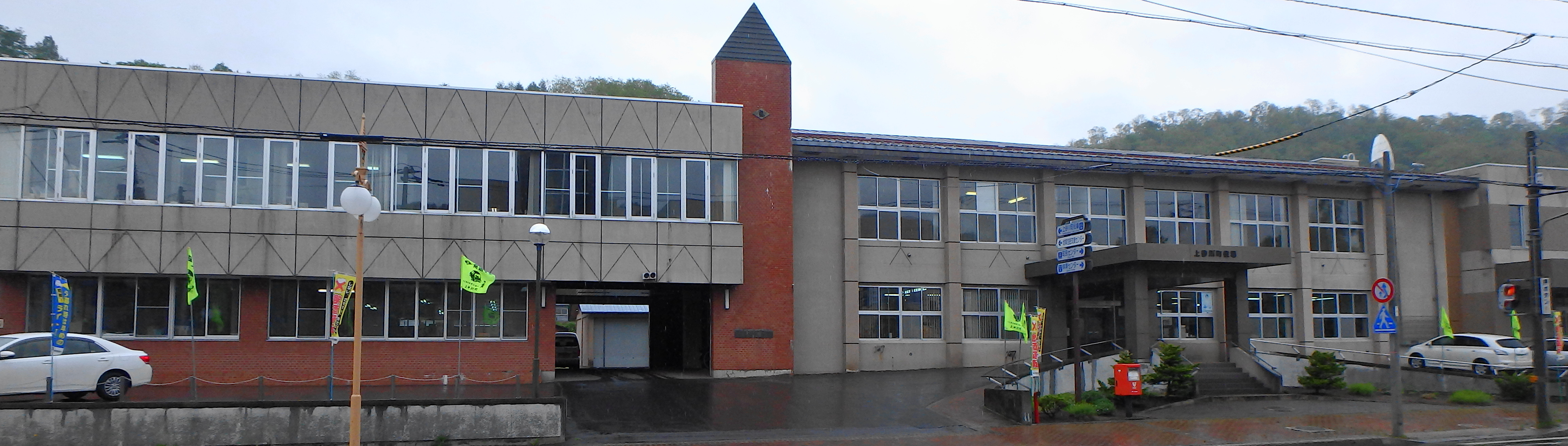
- Kamisunagawa Town Hall

- Flag Emblem

- Location of Kamisunagawa in Hokkaido (Sorachi Subprefecture)

- Location in Japan
- Coordinates: 43°29′N 141°59′E
- Country: Japan
- Region: Hokkaido
- Prefecture: Hokkaido (Sorachi Subprefecture)
- District: Sorachi

Area
  - Total: 39.91 km^{2} (15.41 sq mi)

Population (October 1, 2020)
  - Total: 2,841
  - Density: 71.19/km^{2} (184.4/sq mi)
- Time zone: UTC+09:00 (JST)
- Website: town.kamisunagawa.hokkaido.jp

Kamisunagawa (上砂川町, Kamisunagawa-chō) is a town located in Sorachi Subprefecture, Hokkaido, Japan.

As of 1 October 2020, the town has an estimated population of 3,278. The total area is 39.91 km^{2}. There is a microgravity test facility located in Kamisunagawa used for astronomic purposes.

Since 1980, Kamisunagawa has been the sister city of Sparwood in British Columbia, Canada.

== History ==
- 1949 – Kamisunagawa Town split off from the towns of Sunagawa and Utashinai (partial).
- 2009 – Kamisunagawa Town, more specifically its microgravity test facility, becomes the namesake of a crater on 25143 Itokawa, an asteroid visited by Japanese uncrewed spacecraft Hayabusa.

== Culture ==
=== Mascot ===
Himawari Saki-chan, the town's mascot

Kamisunagawa's mascot is Shi-tan (し～たん). He is a shiitake mushroom. His name is unknown but his name come the either "shiitake town", "see town" or "town of shiitake and coal".

== Notable people from Kamisunagawa ==
- Ikuro Takahashi, drummer
- Junichi Watanabe, writer
- Ryoko Yamagishi, manga artist
