= Jim Jarmusch =

American filmmaker (born 1953)

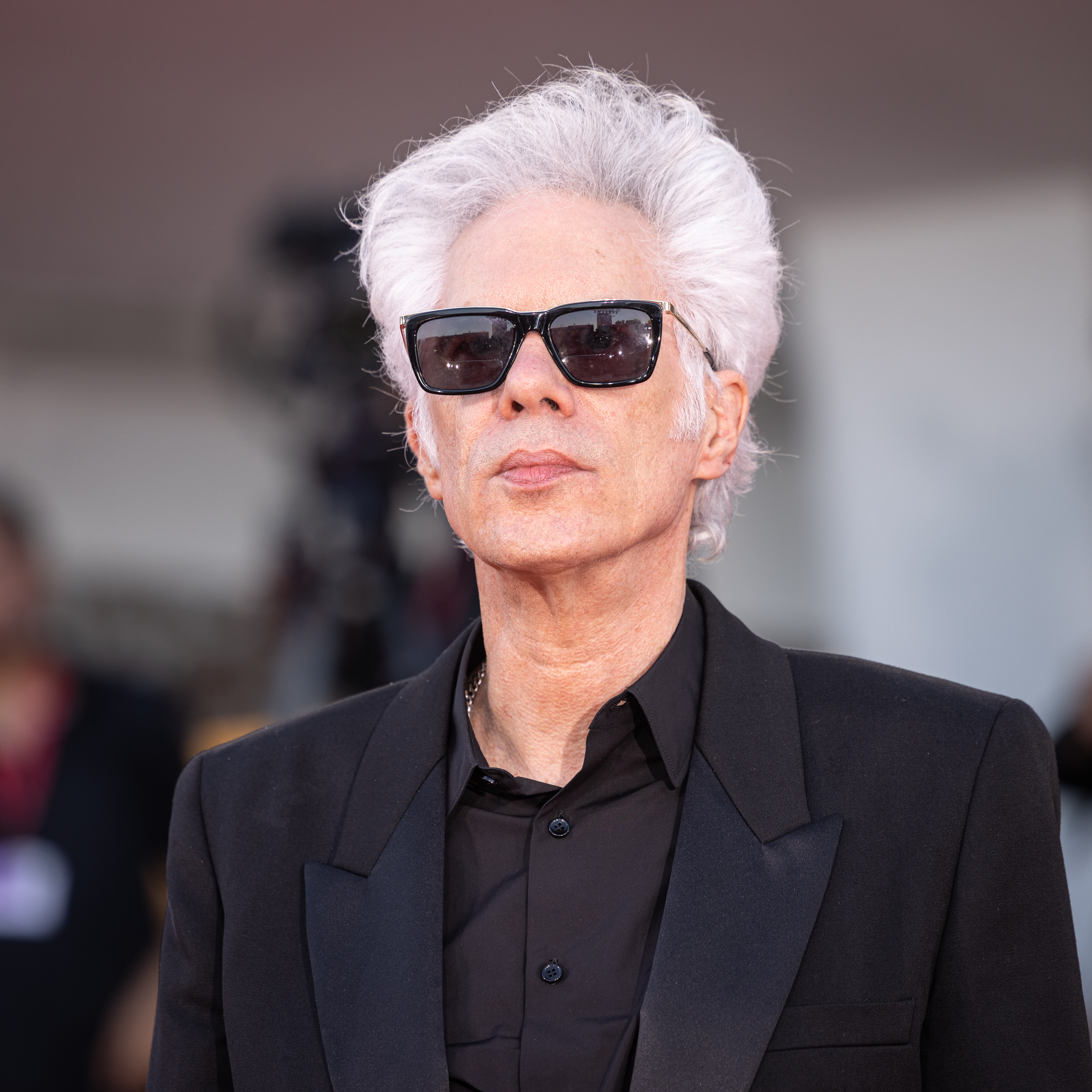
- Jarmusch in 2025
- Born: January 22, 1953 (age 73); Cuyahoga Falls, Ohio, U.S.
- Education: Northwestern University; Columbia University (BA); New York University (MFA)
- Occupations: Filmmaker; actor; composer; writer
- Years active: 1979–present
- Partner: Sara Driver

James Robert Jarmusch (/ˈdʒɑːrməʃ/ JAR-məsh; born January 22, 1953) is an American filmmaker and musician.

He has been a major proponent of independent cinema since the 1980s, directing films such as Permanent Vacation (1980), Stranger Than Paradise (1984), Down by Law (1986), Mystery Train (1989), Night on Earth (1991), Dead Man (1995), Ghost Dog: The Way of the Samurai (1999), Coffee and Cigarettes (2003), Broken Flowers (2005), Only Lovers Left Alive (2013), Paterson (2016) and Father Mother Sister Brother (2025). Stranger Than Paradise was added to the National Film Registry in December 2002. For Father Mother Sister Brother, Jarmusch won the Golden Lion at the 82nd Venice Film Festival.

As a musician, he has been part of the no wave band The Del-Byzanteens and in addition composed music for some of his films. He has released four musical albums with Jozef van Wissem.

== Early life and education ==
James Robert Jarmusch was born on January 22, 1953 in Cuyahoga Falls, Ohio, the second of three children of middle-class suburbanites. His mother, of German and Irish descent, was a reviewer of film and theatre for the Akron Beacon Journal before marrying his father, a businessman of Czech and German descent who worked for the B.F. Goodrich Company. She introduced Jarmusch to cinema by leaving him at a local theater to watch matinee double features such as Attack of the Crab Monsters and Creature from the Black Lagoon while she ran errands. The first adult film he recalls seeing was the 1958 cult classic Thunder Road, the violence and darkness of which left an impression on the seven-year-old Jarmusch. Another B-movie influence from his childhood was Ghoulardi, an eccentric Cleveland television show which featured horror films.

The key, I think, to Jim, is that he went gray when he was 15... As a result, he always felt like an immigrant in the teenage world. He's been an immigrant—a benign, fascinated foreigner—ever since. And all his films are about that.

— Tom Waits, as quoted in The New York Times, 2005.

Jarmusch was an avid reader in his youth and acquired an enthusiasm for film. He had an even greater interest in literature which was encouraged by his grandmother. Though he refused to attend church with his Episcopalian parents (not liking "the idea of sitting in a stuffy room wearing a little tie"), Jarmusch credits literature with shaping his metaphysical beliefs and leading him to reconsider theology in his mid-teens.

From his peers, he developed a taste for counterculture, and he and his friends would steal the records and books of their older siblings—this included works by William Burroughs, Jack Kerouac, and The Mothers of Invention. They made fake identity documents which allowed them to visit bars at the weekend but also the local art house cinema, which typically showed pornographic films but would occasionally feature underground films such as Robert Downey, Sr.'s Putney Swope and Andy Warhol's Chelsea Girls. At one point, he took an apprenticeship with a commercial photographer. He later remarked, "Growing up in Ohio was just planning to get out."

After graduating from high school in 1971, Jarmusch moved to Chicago and enrolled in the Medill School of Journalism at Northwestern University. After being asked to leave because he had neglected to take any journalism courses—Jarmusch favored literature and art history—he transferred to Columbia University the following year, with the intention of becoming a poet. At Columbia he studied English and American literature under professors including New York School avant garde poets Kenneth Koch and David Shapiro. At Columbia, he began to write short "semi-narrative abstract pieces" and edited the undergraduate literary journal The Columbia Review.

During his final year studying at Columbia, Jarmusch moved to Paris for what was initially a summer semester on an exchange program, but turned into 10 months. He worked as a delivery driver for an art gallery and spent most of his time at the Cinémathèque Française.

That's where I saw things I had only read about and heard about—films by many of the good Japanese directors, like Imamura, Ozu, Mizoguchi. Also, films by European directors like Bresson and Dreyer, and even American films, like the retrospective of Samuel Fuller's films, which I only knew from seeing a few of them on television late at night. When I came back from Paris, I was still writing, and my writing was becoming more cinematic in certain ways, more visually descriptive.

— Jarmusch on the Cinémathèque Française, taken from an interview with Lawrence Van Gelder of The New York Times, October 21, 1984.

Jarmusch graduated from Columbia University with a Bachelor of Arts degree in 1975. He was broke and working as a musician in New York City after returning from Paris in 1976. He applied on a whim to the graduate film school of New York University's School of the Arts (then under the direction of Hollywood director László Benedek). Though he lacked experience in filmmaking, his submission of a collection of photographs and an essay about film secured his acceptance into the program. He studied there for four years; he met fellow students and future collaborators Sara Driver, Tom DiCillo, Howard Brookner, and Spike Lee in the process. During the late 1970s in New York City, Jarmusch and his contemporaries were part of a no wave cultural scene centered on the CBGB music club which inspired the formation of his no wave band The Del-Byzanteens.

In his final year at New York University, Jarmusch worked as an assistant to the film noir director Nicholas Ray, who was at that time teaching in the department. In an anecdote, Jarmusch recounted the formative experience of showing his mentor his first script; Ray disapproved of its lack of action, to which Jarmusch responded after meditating on the critique by reworking the script to be even less eventful. On Jarmusch's return with the revised script, Ray reacted favourably to his student's dissent, citing approvingly the young student's obstinate independence. Jarmusch was the only person Ray brought to work—as his personal assistant—on Lightning Over Water, a documentary about his dying years on which he was collaborating with Wim Wenders. Ray died in 1979 after a long fight with cancer. A few days afterwards, having been encouraged by Ray and New York underground filmmaker Amos Poe and using scholarship funds given by the Louis B. Mayer Foundation to pay for his school tuition, Jarmusch started work on a film for his final project. The university was unimpressed with Jarmusch's use of his funding as well as the project itself and refused to award him a degree.

== Career ==
=== 1980s ===
Jarmusch's final year university project was completed in 1980 as Permanent Vacation, his first feature film. It had its premiere at the International Filmfestival Mannheim-Heidelberg (formerly known as Filmweek Mannheim) and won the Josef von Sternberg Award. It was made on a shoestring budget of around $12,000 in misdirected scholarship funds and shot by cinematographer Tom DiCillo on 16 mm film. The quasi-autobiographical feature follows an adolescent drifter (Chris Parker) as he wanders around downtown Manhattan.

The film was not released theatrically and did not attract the sort of adulation from critics that greeted his later work. The Washington Post staff writer Hal Hinson would disparagingly comment in an aside during a review of Jarmusch's Mystery Train (1989) that in the director's debut, "the only talent he demonstrated was for collecting egregiously untalented actors". The bleak and unrefined Permanent Vacation is nevertheless one of the director's most personal films, and established many of the hallmarks he would exhibit in his later work, including derelict urban settings, chance encounters, and a wry sensibility.

Jarmusch's first major film, Stranger Than Paradise, was produced on a budget of approximately $125,000 and released in 1984 to much critical acclaim. A deadpan comedy recounting a strange journey of three disillusioned youths from New York through Cleveland to Florida, the film broke many conventions of traditional Hollywood filmmaking. It was awarded the Camera d'Or at the 1984 Cannes Film Festival as well as the 1985 National Society of Film Critics Award for Best Film, and became a landmark work in modern independent film.

In 1986, Jarmusch wrote and directed Down by Law, starring musicians John Lurie and Tom Waits, and Italian comic actor Roberto Benigni (his introduction to American audiences) as three convicts who escape from a New Orleans jailhouse. Shot like the director's previous efforts in black and white, this constructivist neo-noir was Jarmusch's first collaboration with Dutch cinematographer Robby Müller, who had been known for his work with Wenders.

His next two films each experimented with parallel narratives: Mystery Train (1989) told three successive stories set on the same night in and around a small Memphis hotel, and Night on Earth (1991) involved five cab drivers and their passengers on rides in five different world cities, beginning at sundown in Los Angeles and ending at sunrise in Helsinki. Less bleak and somber than Jarmusch's earlier work, Mystery Train nevertheless retained the director's askance conception of America. He wrote Night on Earth in about a week, out of frustration at the collapse of the production of another film he had written and the desire to visit and collaborate with friends such as Benigni, Gena Rowlands, Winona Ryder, and Isaach de Bankolé.

As a result of his early work, Jarmusch became an influential representative of the trend of the American road movie. Not intended to appeal to mainstream filmgoers, these early Jarmusch films were embraced by art house audiences, gaining a small but dedicated American following and cult status in Europe and Japan. Each of the four films had its premiere at the New York Film Festival, while Mystery Train was in competition at the 1989 Cannes Film Festival. Jarmusch's distinctive aesthetic and auteur status fomented a critical backlash at the close of this early period, however; though reviewers praised the charm and adroitness of Mystery Train and Night On Earth, the director was increasingly charged with repetitiveness and risk-aversion.

A film appearance in 1989 as a used car dealer in the cult comedy Leningrad Cowboys Go America further solidified his interest and participation in the road movie genre. In 1991 Jarmusch appeared as himself in Episode One of John Lurie's cult television series Fishing With John.

=== 1990s ===
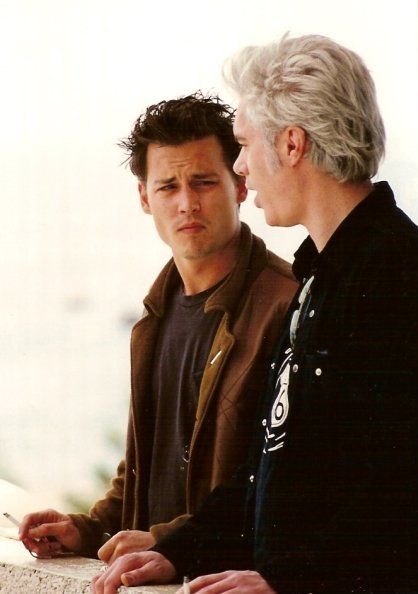
Johnny Depp (left) with Jarmusch at the Cannes Film Festival in 1995

In 1995, Jarmusch released Dead Man, a period film set in the 19th century American West starring Johnny Depp and Gary Farmer. Produced at a cost of almost $9 million with a high-profile cast including John Hurt, Gabriel Byrne and, in his final role, Robert Mitchum, the film marked a significant departure for the director from his previous features. Earnest in tone in comparison to its self-consciously hip and ironic predecessors, Dead Man was thematically expansive and of an often violent and progressively more surreal character. The film was shot in black and white by Robby Müller, and features a score composed and performed by Neil Young, for whom Jarmusch subsequently filmed the tour documentary Year of the Horse, released to tepid reviews in 1997. Though ill-received by mainstream American reviewers, Dead Man found much favor internationally and among critics, many of whom lauded it as a visionary masterpiece. It has been hailed as one of the few films made by a Caucasian that presents an authentic Native American culture and character, and Jarmusch stands by it as such, though it has attracted both praise and castigation for its portrayal of the American West, violence, and especially Native Americans.

Following artistic success and critical acclaim in the American independent film community, he achieved mainstream recognition with his far-East philosophical crime film Ghost Dog: The Way of the Samurai (1999), shot in Jersey City and starring Forest Whitaker as a young inner-city man who has found purpose for his life by unyieldingly conforming it to the Hagakure, an 18th-century philosophy text and training manual for samurai, becoming, as directed, a terrifyingly deadly hit-man for a local mob boss to whom he may owe a debt, and who then betrays him. The soundtrack was supplied by RZA of the Wu-Tang Clan, which blends into the director's "aesthetics of sampling". The film was unique for, among other things, the number of books important to and discussed by its characters, most of them listed bibliographically as part of the end credits. The film is also considered to be a homage to Le Samourai, a 1967 French New Wave film by auteur Jean-Pierre Melville, which starred renowned French actor Alain Delon in a strikingly similar role and narrative.

=== 2000s ===
A five-year gap followed the release of Ghost Dog, which the director has attributed to a creative crisis he experienced in the aftermath of the September 11 attacks in New York City. 2004 saw the eventual release of Coffee and Cigarettes, a collection of eleven short films of characters sitting around drinking coffee and smoking cigarettes that had been filmed by Jarmusch over the course of the previous two decades. The first vignette, "Strange to Meet You", had been shot for and aired on Saturday Night Live in 1986, and paired Roberto Benigni with comedian Steven Wright. This had been followed three years later by "Twins", a segment featuring actors Steve Buscemi and Joie and Cinqué Lee, and then in 1993 with the Short Film Palme d'Or-winning "Somewhere in California", starring musicians Tom Waits and Iggy Pop.

He followed Coffee and Cigarettes in 2005 with Broken Flowers, which starred Bill Murray as an early retiree who goes in search of the mother of his unknown son in attempt to overcome a midlife crisis. Following the release of Broken Flowers, Jarmusch signed a deal with Fortissimo Films, whereby the distributor would fund and have "first-look" rights to the director's future films, and cover some of the overhead costs of his production company, Exoskeleton. The film premiered at the 58th Cannes Film Festival where it competed for the Palme d'Or and received the Grand Prix. Film critic Peter Bradshaw for The Guardian described the film as "Jarmusch's most enjoyable, accessible work for some time, perhaps his most emotionally generous film... a very attractive piece of film-making, bolstered by terrific performances from an all-star cast, spearheaded by endlessly droll, seductively sensitive Bill Murray."

In 2009, Jarmusch released The Limits of Control, a sparse, meditative crime film set in Spain, it starred Isaach de Bankolé as a lone assassin with a secretive mission. A behind-the-scenes documentary, Behind Jim Jarmusch, was filmed over three days on the set of the film in Seville by director Léa Rinaldi. Also in 2009, Jarmusch appeared as himself in an episode of the HBO series Bored to Death, and the following year, Jarmusch helped to curate the All Tomorrow's Parties music festival in Monticello, New York.

=== 2010s ===
In an August 2010 interview, Jarmusch revealed his forthcoming work schedule at that time:

I'm working on a documentary about the Stooges [Iggy Pop-fronted band]. It's going to take a few years. There's no rush on it, but it's something that Iggy asked me to do. I'm co-writing an "opera". It won't be a traditional opera, but it'll be about the inventor Nikola Tesla, with the composer Phil Klein. I have a new film project that's really foremost for me that I hope to shoot early next year with Tilda Swinton and Michael Fassbender and Mia Wasikowska, who was Alice in Wonderland in Tim Burton's film. I don't have that quite financed yet, so I'm working on that. I'm also making music and hoping to maybe score some silent films to put out. Our band will have an EP that we'll give out at ATP. We have enough music for three EPs or an album.

Jarmusch eventually attained funding for the aforementioned film project after a protracted period and, in July 2012, Jarmusch began shooting Only Lovers Left Alive with Tilda Swinton, Tom Hiddleston, Mia Wasikowska, Anton Yelchin, and Hurt, while Jarmusch's musical project Sqürl were the main contributors to the film's soundtrack. The film screened at the 2013 Cannes Film Festival and the 2013 Toronto International Film Festival (TIFF), with Jarmusch explaining the seven-year completion time frame at the former: "The reason it took so long is that no one wanted to give us the money. It took years to put it together. Its (sic) getting more and more difficult for films that are a little unusual, or not predictable, or don't satisfy people's expectations of something." The film's budget was US$7 million and its UK release date was February 21, 2014.

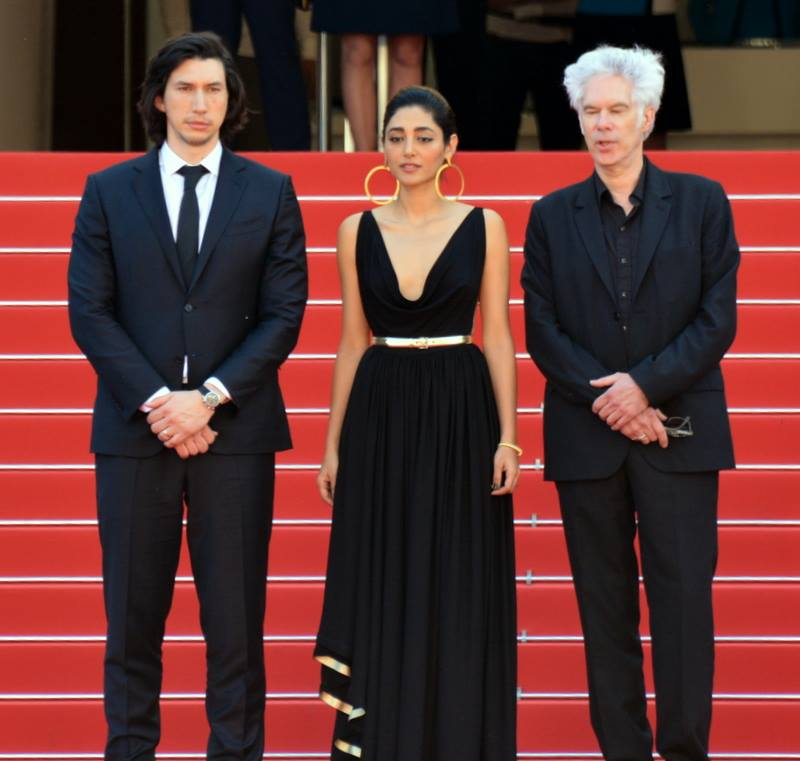
Adam Driver, Golshifteh Farahani, and Jarmusch at the premiere of Paterson (2016) at the Cannes Film Festival

Jarmusch wrote and directed Paterson in 2016. The film follows the daily experiences of an inner-city bus driver and poet (Adam Driver) in Paterson, New Jersey, who shares the same name as the city. Paterson was inspired by objectivist American poet William Carlos Williams and his epic poem "Paterson". The film features the wry, minimalist style found in Jarmusch's other works and earned 22 award nominations for Jarmusch, Driver and Nellie, the dog featured in the film. The story focuses on Paterson's poetry writing efforts, interspersed with his observations and experiences of the residents he encounters on his bus route and in his daily life. Todd McCarthy of The Hollywood Reporter gave the film a positive review, writing: "A mild-mannered, almost startlingly undramatic work that offers discreet pleasures to longtime fans of the New York indie-scene veteran, who can always be counted on to go his own way." Eric Kohn, film critic of IndieWire wrote that the film was "an apt statement from Jarmusch, a filmmaker who continues to surprise and innovate while remaining true to his singular voice, and who here seems to have delivered its purest manifestation."

Jarmusch wrote and directed his first horror film, the zombie comedy The Dead Don't Die featuring an ensemble cast which included performances from Bill Murray, Adam Driver, Chloë Sevigny, Steve Buscemi, Tilda Swinton, Carol Kane, and Selena Gomez. The film premiered at the 72nd Cannes Film Festival and received mixed reviews. It was distributed by Focus Features. Todd McCarthy of The Hollywood Reporter wrote, "At times, the deadpan of Murray and Driver becomes, well, a bit deadening, and true wit is in short supply, even though the film remains amusing most of the way."

=== 2020s ===
Jarmusch directed and wrote a short film titled French Water for the Yves Saint Laurent House of Fashion to celebrate their spring/summer 2021 collection. It starred Charlotte Gainsbourg and Julianne Moore, among others.

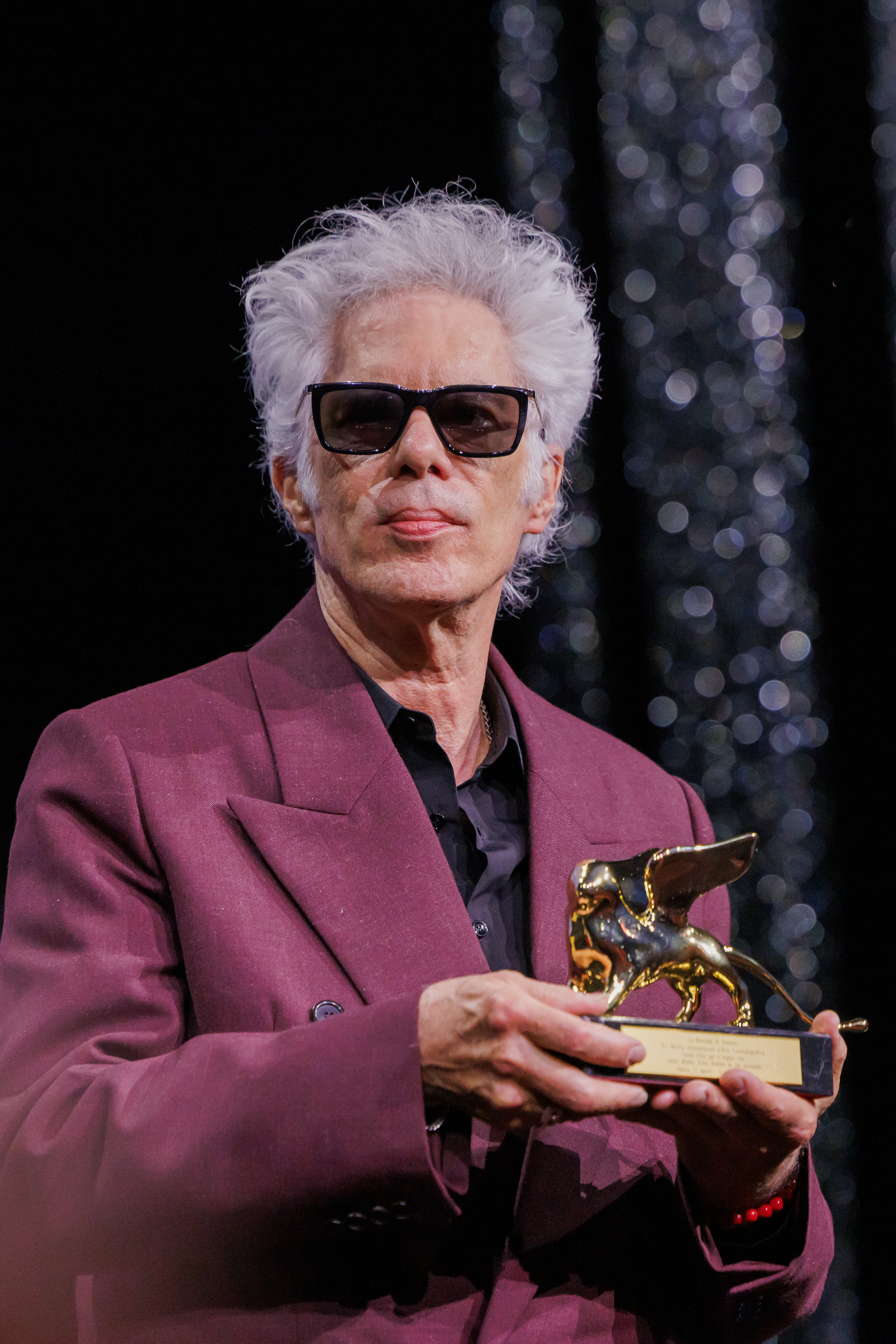
Jim Jarmusch inside the 2025 Venice Film Festival Award Ceremony with his Golden Lion award

In September 2021, Jarmusch published with Anthology Editions a hardcover book of his small-scale collage art called Some Collages with texts by Lucy Sante and Randy Kennedy.

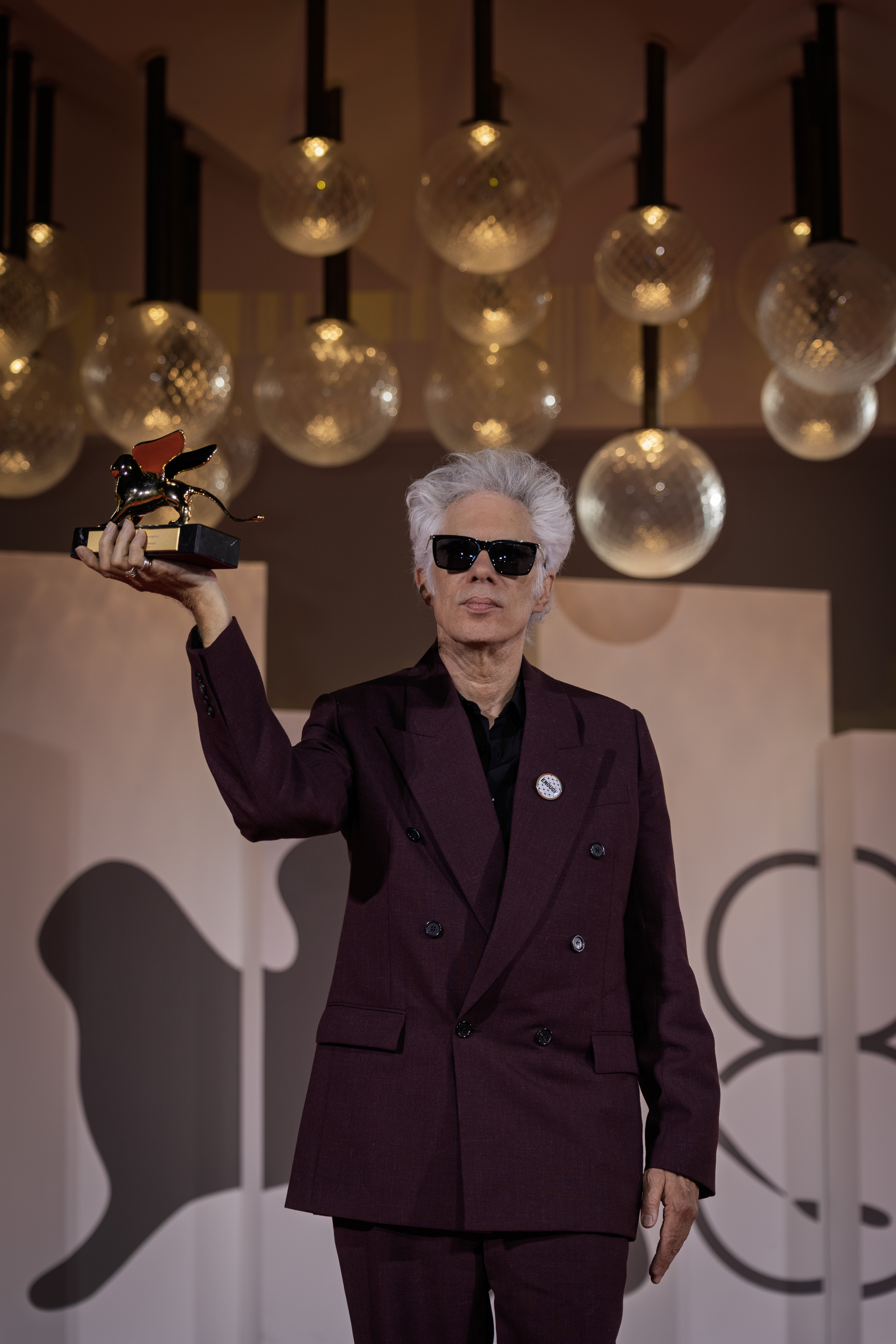
Jarmusch at the 2025 Venice Film Festival

Jarmusch wrote and directed Father Mother Sister Brother. Jarmusch first spoke about the film at the Outlook Festival in April 2023, where he said he was working on a new film that was a "very subtle film; it's very quiet… Funny and sad". He hinted that the film may not have any music. Filming taking place in New Jersey, Dublin, and Paris. It premiered at the 82nd Venice International Film Festival in 2025, winning the Golden Lion.

== Music ==
In the early 1980s, Jarmusch was part of a revolving lineup of musicians in Robin Crutchfield's Dark Day project, and later became the keyboardist and one of two vocalists for The Del-Byzanteens, a No Wave band who released the LP Lies to Live By in 1982.

Jarmusch is also featured on the album Wu-Tang Meets the Indie Culture (2005) in two interludes described by Sean Fennessy in a Pitchfork review of the album as both "bizarrely pretentious" and "reason alone to give it a listen". Jarmusch and Michel Gondry each contributed a remix to a limited edition release of the track "Blue Orchid" by The White Stripes in 2005.

He released four collaborative albums with lutist Jozef van Wissem: Concerning the Entrance into Eternity (Important Records); The Mystery of Heaven (Sacred Bones Records) in 2012, the 2019 release An Attempt to Draw Aside the Veil (Sacred Bones Records) and in 2025 The Day the Angels cried (Incunabulum Records). Jarmusch and van Wissem also collaborated on the soundtrack of Only Lovers Left Alive.

Jarmusch first met van Wissem on a street in New York City's SoHo neighborhood in 2007, at which time the lute player handed the director a CD. Several months later, Jarmusch asked van Wissem to send his catalog of recordings and the two started playing together as part of their developing friendship. Van Wissem explained in early April 2014: "I know the way [Jarmusch] makes his films is kind of like a musician. He has music in his head when he's writing a script so it's more informed by a tonal thing than it is by anything else."

Jarmusch is a member of the avant-garde rock band Sqürl with film associate Carter Logan and sound engineer Shane Stoneback. The band formed to create additional soundtracks for Jarmusch's film The Limits of Control, which they released together with two other songs on an EP called "Film Music from The Limits of Control" under the name Bad Rabbit. Sqürl's version of Wanda Jackson's 1961 song "Funnel of Love", featuring Madeline Follin of Cults on vocals, opens Jarmusch's 2014 film Only Lovers Left Alive. On March 8, 2023, Sqürl announced its debut album Silver Haze and released lead single "Berlin '87". The album was released on May 5 by Sacred Bones Records.

== Legacy as a filmmaker ==
In 2014, Jarmusch shunned the "auteur theory" and likened the filmmaking process to human sexual reproduction:

I put 'A film by' as a protection of my rights, but I don't really believe it. It's important for me to have a final cut, and I do for every film. So I'm in the editing room every day, I'm the navigator of the ship, but I'm not the captain, I can't do it without everyone's equally valuable input. For me it's phases where I'm very solitary, writing, and then I'm preparing, getting the money, and then I'm with the crew and on a ship and it's amazing and exhausting and exhilarating, and then I'm alone with the editor again... I've said it before, it's like seduction, wild sex, and then pregnancy in the editing room. That's how it feels for me.

Jarmusch recorded a Q & A in 2010 for the Criterion Blu-ray release of Mystery Train. He explained at the beginning that he did this, instead of the usual practice of a director's commentary to be played over the film itself, because "I don't like looking at my films again—it's agony to me."

=== Style ===
Nothing is original. Steal from anywhere that resonates with inspiration or fuels your imagination. Devour old films, new films, music, books, paintings, photographs, poems, dreams, random conversations, architecture, bridges, street signs, trees, clouds, bodies of water, light and shadows. Select only things to steal from that speak directly to your soul. If you do this, your work (and theft) will be authentic. Authenticity is invaluable; originality is nonexistent. And don't bother concealing your thievery—celebrate it if you feel like it. In any case, always remember what Jean-Luc Godard said: "It's not where you take things from—it's where you take them to."

— Jim Jarmusch's Golden Rules – #5, 2004,

Jarmusch has been characterized as a minimalist filmmaker whose idiosyncratic films are unhurried. His films often eschew traditional narrative structure, lacking clear plot progression and focus more on mood and character development. In an interview early in his career, he stated that his goal was "to approximate real time for the audience."

His early work is marked by a brooding, contemplative tone, featuring extended silent scenes and prolonged still shots. He has experimented with a vignette format in three films that were either released, or begun around, the early 1990s: Mystery Train, Night on Earth and Coffee and Cigarettes. The Salt Lake Tribune critic Sean P. Means wrote that Jarmusch blends "film styles and genres with sharp wit and dark humor", while his style is also defined by a signature deadpan comedic tone.

The protagonists of Jarmusch's films are usually lone adventurers. The director's male characters have been described by critic Jennie Yabroff as "three time losers, petty thiefs and inept con men, all... eminently likeable, if not down right charming"; while novelist Paul Auster described them as "laconic, withdrawn, sorrowful mumblers".

Jarmusch has revealed that his instinct is a greater influence during the filmmaking process than any cognitive processes. He explained: "I feel like I have to listen to the film and let it tell me what it wants. Sometimes it mumbles and it isn't very clear." Films such as Dead Man and Limits of Control have polarized fans and general viewers alike, as Jarmusch's stylistic instinct is embedded in his strong sense of independence.

=== Themes ===
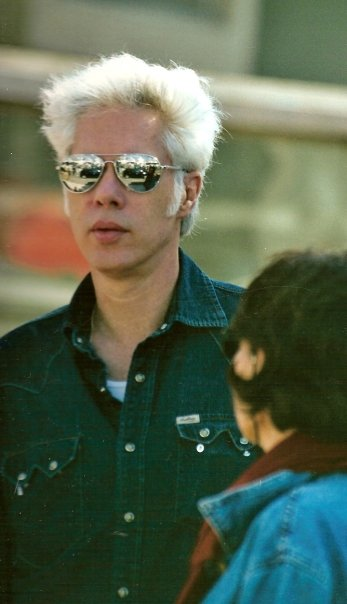
Jarmusch at the 2005 Cannes Film Festival

Though his films are predominantly set in the United States, Jarmusch has advanced the notion that he looks at America "through a foreigner's eyes", with the intention of creating a form of world cinema that synthesizes European and Japanese film with that of Hollywood. His films have often included foreign actors and characters, and (at times substantial) non-English dialogue. In his two later-nineties films, he dwelt on different cultures' experiences of violence, and on textual appropriations between cultures: a wandering Native American's love of William Blake, a black hitman's passionate devotion to the Hagakure. The interaction and syntheses between different cultures, the arbitrariness of national identity, and irreverence towards ethnocentric, patriotic or nationalistic sentiment are recurring themes in Jarmusch's work.

Jarmusch's fascination with music is another characteristic that is readily apparent in his work. Musicians appear frequently in key roles—John Lurie, Tom Waits, Gary Farmer, Youki Kudoh, RZA and Iggy Pop have featured in multiple Jarmusch films, while Joe Strummer and Screamin' Jay Hawkins appear in Mystery Train and GZA, Jack and Meg White feature in Coffee and Cigarettes. Hawkins' song "I Put a Spell on You" was central to the plot of Stranger than Paradise, while Mystery Train is inspired by and named after a song popularized by Elvis Presley, who is also the subject of a vignette in Coffee and Cigarettes. In the words of critic Vincent Canby, "Jarmusch's movies have the tempo and rhythm of blues and jazz, even in their use—or omission—of language. His films work on the senses much the way that some music does, unheard until it's too late to get it out of one's head."

During a 1989 interview Jarmusch commented on his narrative focus, "I'd rather make a movie about a guy walking his dog than about the emperor of China."

== Filmography ==
Year	Title	Distribution
1980	Permanent Vacation	Cinesthesia
1984	Stranger Than Paradise	The Samuel Goldwyn Company
1986	Down by Law	Island Pictures
1989	Mystery Train	Orion Classics
1991	Night on Earth	Fine Line Features
1995	Dead Man	Miramax Films
1999	Ghost Dog: The Way of the Samurai	Artisan Entertainment
2003	Coffee and Cigarettes	Metro-Goldwyn-Mayer
2005	Broken Flowers	Focus Features
2009	The Limits of Control	Focus Features
2013	Only Lovers Left Alive	Sony Pictures Classics
2016	Paterson	Amazon Studios / Bleecker Street
2019	The Dead Don't Die	Focus Features
2025	Father Mother Sister Brother	Mubi
TBA	Sheep & Wolf	

== Awards and legacy ==
In 1980, Jarmusch's film Permanent Vacation won the Josef von Sternberg Award at the International Filmfestival Mannheim-Heidelberg. In 1999, he was laureate of the Douglas Sirk Preis at Filmfest Hamburg, Germany. In 1984, he won the Caméra d'Or at Cannes Film Festival for Stranger Than Paradise. In 2004, Jarmusch was honored with the "Filmmaker on the Edge Award" at the Provincetown International Film Festival. In 2005, he won the Grand Prix of the 2005 Cannes Film Festival for his film Broken Flowers. He won the Golden Lion at the 82nd Venice International Film Festival for Father Mother Sister Brother in 2025.

Jarmusch is credited with having instigated the American independent film movement with Stranger Than Paradise. In her description of the film in a 2005 profile of the director for The New York Times, critic Lynn Hirschberg declared that Stranger Than Paradise "permanently upended the idea of independent film as an intrinsically inaccessible avant-garde form". The success of the film accorded the director a certain iconic status within arthouse cinema, as an idiosyncratic and uncompromising auteur, exuding the aura of urban cool embodied by downtown Manhattan. Such perceptions were reinforced by the release of his subsequent features in the late 1980s, establishing him as one of the generation's most prominent and influential independent filmmakers.

New York critic and festival director Kent Jones undermined the "urban cool" association that Jarmusch has garnered and was quoted in a February 2014 media article, following the release of his eleventh feature film:

There's been an overemphasis on the hipness factor—and a lack of emphasis on his incredible attachment to the idea of celebrating poetry and culture. You can complain about the preciousness of a lot of his movies, [but] they are unapologetically standing up for poetry. [His attitude is] 'if you want to call me an elitist, go ahead, I don't care'.

Jarmusch's staunch independence has been represented by his success in retaining the negatives for all of his films, an achievement that was described by the Guardian's Jonathan Romney as "extremely rare." British producer Jeremy Thomas, who was one of the eventual financiers of Only Lovers Left Alive called Jarmusch "one of the great American independent film-makers" who is "the last of the line." Thomas believes that filmmakers like Jarmusch "are not coming through... any more."

In a 1989 review of his work, Vincent Canby of The New York Times called Jarmusch "the most adventurous and arresting film maker to surface in the American cinema in this decade". He was recognized with the "Filmmaker on the Edge" award at the 2004 Provincetown International Film Festival. A retrospective of the director's films was hosted at the Walker Art Center in Minneapolis, Minnesota, during February 1994, and another, "The Sad and Beautiful World of Jim Jarmusch", by the American Film Institute in August 2005.

While Swinton, who has worked with Jarmusch on numerous occasions, describes him as a "rock star", the director admits that "I don't know where I fit in. I don't feel tied to my time." Dutch lute player Jozef van Wissem, who worked on the score for Only Lovers Left Alive calls Jarmusch a "cultural sponge" who "absorbs everything."

The moving image collection of Jim Jarmusch is held at the Academy Film Archive.

In 2008, Jarmusch received Carrosse d'Or at the 2008 Cannes Film Festival.

== Personal life ==
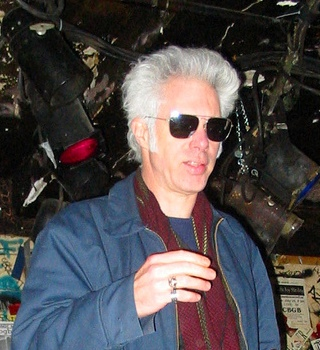
Jarmusch at punk club CBGB in New York City in November 2003

Jarmusch rarely discusses his personal life in public. He divides his time between New York City and the Catskill Mountains. He stopped drinking coffee in 1986, the year of the first installment of Coffee and Cigarettes, although he continues to smoke cigarettes. He has been a vegetarian since 1987.

Jarmusch has been a supporter of Pro-Palestine causes and was one of 55 celebrities to sign the Artists4Ceasefire letter calling for an immediate ceasefire in Gaza.

The author of a series of essays on influential bands, Jarmusch has also had at least two poems published. He is a founding member of The Sons of Lee Marvin, a humorous "semi-secret society" of artists resembling the iconic actor, which issues communiqués and meets on occasion for the ostensible purpose of watching Marvin's films.

In a February 2014 interview, Jarmusch stated that he is not interested in eternal life, as "there's something about the cycle of life that's very important, and to have that removed would be a burden".

== Frequent collaborators ==
In the following table, entries marked with an a indicate collaborators who acted in a film; those marked c composed music for the film.

Work Actor
Work Actor	Permanent Vacation	Stranger Than Paradise	Down by Law	Mystery Train	Night on Earth	Dead Man	Ghost Dog: The Way of the Samurai	Coffee and Cigarettes	Broken Flowers	The Limits of Control	Only Lovers Left Alive	Paterson	The Dead Don't Die	Father Mother Sister Brother
Sara Driver	a	a											a	
John Lurie	a/c	a/c	a/c	c										
Rockets Redglare		a	a	a										
Tom Waits			a	a	c			a					a	a
Roberto Benigni			a		a			a						
Cinqué Lee				a				a						
Steve Buscemi				a				a					a	
Isaach de Bankolé					a		a	a		a				
John Hurt						a				a	a			
Iggy Pop						a		a					a	
RZA							a/c	a					a	
Bill Murray								a	a	a			a	
Tilda Swinton									a	a	a		a	
Adam Driver												a	a	a
Luka Sabbat													a	a
Cate Blanchett								a						a

== Discography ==
Studio albums

- Concerning the Entrance into Eternity (Important Records, 2012) (with Jozef van Wissem)
- The Mystery of Heaven (Sacred Bones Records, 2012) (with Jozef van Wissem)
- An Attempt to Draw Aside the Veil (Sacred Bones Records, 2019) (with Jozef van Wissem)
- Ranaldo Jarmusch Urselli Pandi (Trost, 2019) (with Lee Ranaldo, Marc Urselli, Balazs Pandi)
- Churning of the Ocean (Trost, 2021) (with Lee Ranaldo, Marc Urselli, Balazs Pandi)
- Silver Haze (Sacred Bones, 2023) (as Sqürl)
- The Day the Angels cried (Incunabulum, 2025) (with Jozef van Wissem)

Soundtracks

- Only Lovers Left Alive (ATP Recordings, 2013) (as Sqürl, with Jozef van Wissem)
- Paterson (Third Man Records, 2017) (as Sqürl)
- The Dead Don't Die (Sacred Bones Records, 2019) (as Sqürl)
- Some Music for Robby Müller (Soundtrack Living the Light—documentary) (Sacred Bones Records, 2020) (as Sqürl)
- Music for Man Ray (Score to Man Ray's short films) (Sacred Bones Records, 2024) (as Squrl)
- Father Mother Sister Brother (Sacred Bones Records, 2025), with Anika

EPs

- EP #1 (ATP Recordings, 2013) (as Sqürl)
- EP #2 (ATP Recordings, 2013) (as Sqürl)
- EP #3 (ATP Recordings, 2014) (as Sqürl)
- EP #260 (Sacred Bones Records, 2017) (as Sqürl)

Live albums

- Sqürl Live at Third Man Records (12" vinyl, A Third Man Records, 2016) (as Sqürl)

Guest appearances

- Jozef van Wissem—"Concerning the Beautiful Human Form After Death" from The Joy That Never Ends (2011)
- Fucked Up—"Year of the Tiger" (2012)

Remixes

- The White Stripes—"Blue Orchid" (First Nations Remix) (2005)

== See also ==
- No Wave Cinema
