= Silver Haze (Sqürl album) =

2023 studio album

Studio album by Sqürl
- Released: May 5, 2023
- Genre: Drone rock, stoner rock
- Length: 38:44
- Label: Sacred Bones
- Producer: Randall Dunn, Sqürl

Sqürl chronology
Some Music for Robby Müller (2020)	Silver Haze (2023)	Music for Man Ray (2024)

Singles from Silver Haze
- 1. "Berlin '87" Released: March 8, 2023; 2. "John Ashbery Takes a Walk" Released: April 4, 2023

Silver Haze is the debut studio album by Sqürl, a duo consisting of filmmaker Jim Jarmusch and film producer Carter Logan. The album was released on May 5, 2023, by Sacred Bones Records. It was produced by the duo and Randall Dunn and features collaborations with Charlotte Gainsbourg, Anika, and Marc Ribot. Two singles were released from the album, both with music videos directed by Jem Cohen. It was received positively by critics.

== Background ==
Sqürl, originally known as Bad Rabbit, was formed by Jarmusch, Logan, and sound engineer Shane Stoneback to score the former's 2009 film The Limits of Control. They subsequently released multiple EPs and scores for other Jarmusch films including Only Lovers Left Alive and Paterson. The name "Sqürl" is a reference to the Cate Blanchett segment of Jarmusch's Coffee and Cigarettes.

== Release ==
The lead single, "Berlin '87", was released March 8, 2023, along with a music video directed by Jem Cohen. The video consists of black-and-white shots of Berlin streets, with the track having been inspired by Jarmusch's time living in the city. The second single, "John Ashbery Takes a Walk" featuring Charlotte Gainsbourg, released on April 4 with another video by Cohen. The album was released on May 5.

== Style ==
The album has been called drone rock and stoner rock.

== Reception ==
Silver Haze ratings
Aggregate scores
Source	Rating
Metacritic	81/100
Review scores
Source	Rating
MusicOMH	3.5/5 stars
Pitchfork	6.9/10
Spectrum Culture	75%
Uncut	8/10

According to the review aggregator Metacritic, Silver Haze received "universal acclaim" based on a weighted average score of 81 out of 100 from 4 critic scores. Aquarium Drunkard included the album in their unranked 2023 Year in Review, with a blurb that called it "Sqürl's most expansive outing to date, a long form listen that evokes the patient, meditative drifts of Jarmusch's best films."

== Track listing ==
All tracks are written by Jim Jarmusch and Carter Logan with others noted.

Silver Haze track listing
No.	Title	Writer(s)	Length
1.	"Berlin '87"		4:37
2.	"The End of the World"		5:47
3.	"Garden of Glass Flowers" (featuring Marc Ribot)	Ribot	4:25
4.	"She Don't Wanna Talk About It" (featuring Anika)	Annika Henderson	4:39
5.	"Il Deserto Rosso" (featuring Marc Ribot)	Ribot	6:01
6.	"John Ashbery Takes a Walk" (featuring Charlotte Gainsbourg)	John Ashbery	3:28
7.	"Queen Elizabeth"		3:10
8.	"Silver Haze"		6:37
Total length:			38:44

== Personnel ==
=== Musicians ===
- Jim Jarmusch – guitar (1–4), vocals (2, 4)
- Carter Logan – drums (1, 2, 4), Moog synthesizer (2, 4), percussion (3)
- Arjan Miranda – bass (1–4)
- Brent Arnold – cello (1)
- Marc Ribot – guitar (3, 5)
- Anika – vocals (4)
- Charlotte Gainsbourg – vocals (6)

=== Technical ===
- Jim Jarmusch – producer
- Carter Logan – producer
- Randall Dunn – producer, mixing engineer
- Heba Kadry – mastering engineer
- Garret De Block – recording engineer
- Arjan Miranda – recording engineer
