= Ché-Shizu =

Ché-SHIZU (シェシズ) is an underground Japanese improv/folk group consisting of Chie Mukai (向井千恵) and others. The group's sound is dominated by Mukai's vocals and er-hu playing. The group was formed in 1980. Many notable musicians from the Japanese underground have played in the group at one time or another, including Tori Kudo, Masami Tada, Masami Shinoda, Yuriko Mukojima, and Ikuro Takahashi.

== Discography ==
- Yakusoku wa dekinai (約束はできない) LP (zero records, 1984; CD reissue on Alchemy Records, 2001)
- V.A., Aura Music LP (zero records, 1984)
- V.A., Welcome to Dreamland LP/CD (Celluloid, 1985)
- Live-Shu 1 (1986-1988) cassette (Steeple & Globe, 1990)
- V.A., Mushy cassette (Gekkan Kaeru, 1992)
- Nazareth (ナザレ) CD (PSF, 1993)
- A Journey CD (PSF, 1994)
- Live 1996 Suisho CD (PSF, 1997)
- Glimmering Star (瞬きの星) LP (Aleutian Retto, 1999; CD reissue on Alchemy Records, 2001)
- 火の環 = Hi No Tamaki LP/CD (Jigen Production, 2016)
