= Kousokuya =

Kousokuya (光束夜, Kōsokuya) is a Japanese dark psychedelic rock band. This rock outfit, founded by guitarist Jutok Kaneko in the late 1970s, has released only a handful of recordings internationally, and scant more in their local Tokyo underground scene.

Kaneko died on January 24, 2007.

== Line-up ==
The classic trio line-up that recorded the first album, and reformed in recent years was:

- Jutok Kaneko (guitar, vocals)
- Ikuro Takahashi (ex-High Rise, Fushitsusha) (drums)
- Mick (bass, vocals)

Other members:

- Hiroshi Yokoyama (synth, 1978-1979),
- Toshiko Watanabe (drums, 1979),
- Asahito Nanjo (bass, 1982-1983),
- Munehiro Narita (drums, 1982-1983),
- Atsushi Ishiguro (drums, 1983–84),
- Takahashi Ikurou (drums, 1989–90),
- Hibari Nagao (drums, 1994-1997),
- Emily (bass),
- Sachiko (vocals, synth, bass, 1995-2003),
- Michinobu Matsubashi (drums, 2000-)

== Discography ==
- V.A., Heaven Tapes cassette (Heaven, 1979)
- Kousokuya LP (Ray Night Music, 1991; CD reissue, PSF, 2003)
- V.A., Tokyo Flashback (PSF, 1991)
- V.A., Tokyo Flashback 2 (PSF, 1992)
- Ray Night 1991-1992 Live (Forced Exposure, 1995)
- The Dark Spot w/ Masayoshi Urabe (PSF, 1997)
- Live Gyakuryu Kokuu (PSF, 2004)
- First Live 1979 Kichijoji Minor (PSF, 2006)
- Echoes From Deep Underground (Archive, 2007)
