= Ikuro Takahashi =

- Ikuro Takahashi playing live

Background information
- Birth name: Ikuro Takahashi
- Born: 1957 (age 67–68); Kamisunagawa, Hokkaido, Japan
- Genres: Alternative rock, electronic, noise rock, art rock, funk
- Instrument(s): Drums, percussion

Ikuro Takahashi (高橋幾郎 Takahashi Ikuro in Japanese) (born in 1957, Kamisunagawa, Hokkaido) is a Japanese drummer and percussionist based in Sapporo, also plays electronic and oscillators. He has been a central member of many groups from the Tokyo psychedelic underground from the early eighties. Some of the groups he has played with include Fushitsusha, High Rise, Kousokuya, Maher Shalal Hash Baz, Ché-SHIZU, Nagisa ni te, LSD March, Gu-N, and Akebonoizu, Tetsuya Umeda and Fumio Kosakai of Incapacitants. He has performed under the name Anoyondekigoto since 2000, a unit project with a Butoh dancer Yoko Muronoi (1959- 2017). He runs his own label Galleria Zarigania since 2007.

== Discography ==
=== Fushitsusha ===
- 2012 Mabushii Itazura na Inori (CD, Heartfast)
- 2012 Hikari To Nazukeyou (CD, Heartfast)
- 1998 A little longer thus (CD, Tokuma)
- 1998 The Wisdom Prepared (CD, Tokuma)
- 1998 Withdrawe, this sable disclosure 'ere devot'd (CD, Les Disques Victo)
- 1998 I saw it! that which before I could only sense (2CD Paratactile)

=== LSD March ===
- 2003 Totsuzen honno no gotoku LP (White Elephant)
- 2005 Domori to sanshu CD (Siwa)
- 2005 Kanashimino bishonen LP (HP Cycle)
- 2005 Shindara jigoku LP (Siwa)

=== Kousokuya ===
- 1991 Kousokuya LP (Ray Night Music, 1991; CD reissue, PSF 2003)
- 1995 Ray Night 1991-1992 Live CD (Forced Exposure)
- 2004 Live Gyakuryu Kokuu CD (PSF)

=== Maher Shalal Hash Baz ===
- 1991 Maher Goes to Gothic Country LP (Org)
- 1996 Return Visit to Rock Mass 3LP/3CD (Org)

=== Che-SHIZU ===
- 1997 Live 1996 Suisho CD (PSF)
- 1999 Glimmering Star LP (Aleutian Retto)

=== Aihiyo ===
- 1998 Aihiyo CD (Tokuma)
- 2000 Live CD (PSF)

=== Other ===
- 1975-1977 as Seishokki (LP Siwa 2005)
- 1984 with High Rise (LP, PSF)
- 1993 untitled with Reiko A (Cassette NekoIsis)
- 1995 Gu-N with Gu-N (CD, Pataphysique)
- 1997 Live Performance 1992/1994 with Tamio Shiraishi (CD, Pataphysique)
- 1997 Of Dogstarman with Fumio Kosakai (CD, Pataphysique)
- 2004 Anoyo no dekigoto (LP, Siwa)
- 2008 Moere with Umeda Tetsuya (CD, Majikick Records)
- 2017 with Eddie Marcon, Strobo / Koshin (7inch Single, Pong-Kong Records)
