= Other Music =

Former music store in New York City

Coordinates: 40.728104°N 73.993606°W

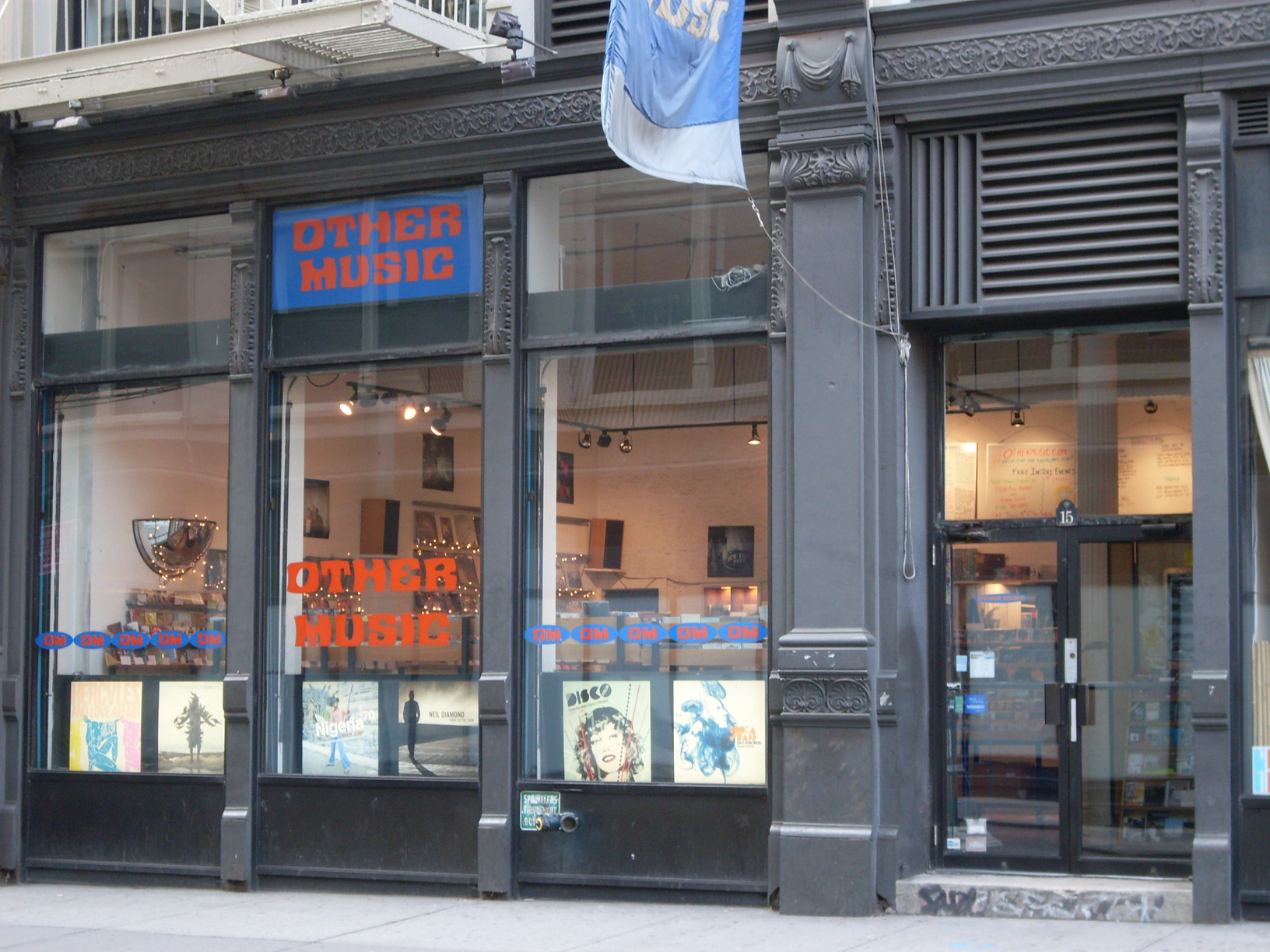
Other Music's former location in NYC

Other Music was a music retail store that sold CDs, records and cassettes online and at their brick-and-mortar location in the Noho neighborhood of Manhattan, New York City. The store specialized in the sale of closely curated underground, rare and experimental music. The physical store was located at 15 E 4th St, New York, NY 10003 from 1995 to June 2016.

In January 2007, Other Music announced that it planned to sell high-quality MP3 files for download without using any type of digital rights management. This announcement follows similar moves made by other small online music retailers, including United Kingdom–based Rough Trade, New York–based Insound and New York–based Anthology Recordings. The announcement also coincided with the closing of Tower Records' Lower Manhattan location. According to Other Music co-owner Josh Madell, this closing signifies the growing hardship of selling music out of a physical store, especially considering his store's location just across the street from Tower.

In August 2012, Other Music launched the record label Other Music Recording Company in a partnership with the Oxford, Mississippi–based record label Fat Possum Records. Among the label's first releases was an album by Japanese musician Shintaro Sakamoto.

In May 2016, Other Music announced its plans to close on June 25. Co-owner Josh Madell cited rising rents and the changing face of the music industry as the reasons for the closure.

== Recognition ==
Writing about Other Music's closure for The New Yorker, Amanda Petrusich said, "In 1999, if you were the type of person who was looking for something a little different (more challenging, more sophisticated, more esoteric) from the schlock being peddled to the herds of dead-eyed automatons browsing the Tower Records up the block, then here was the store for you!"
