= Jozef van Wissem =

Dutch composer and lute player

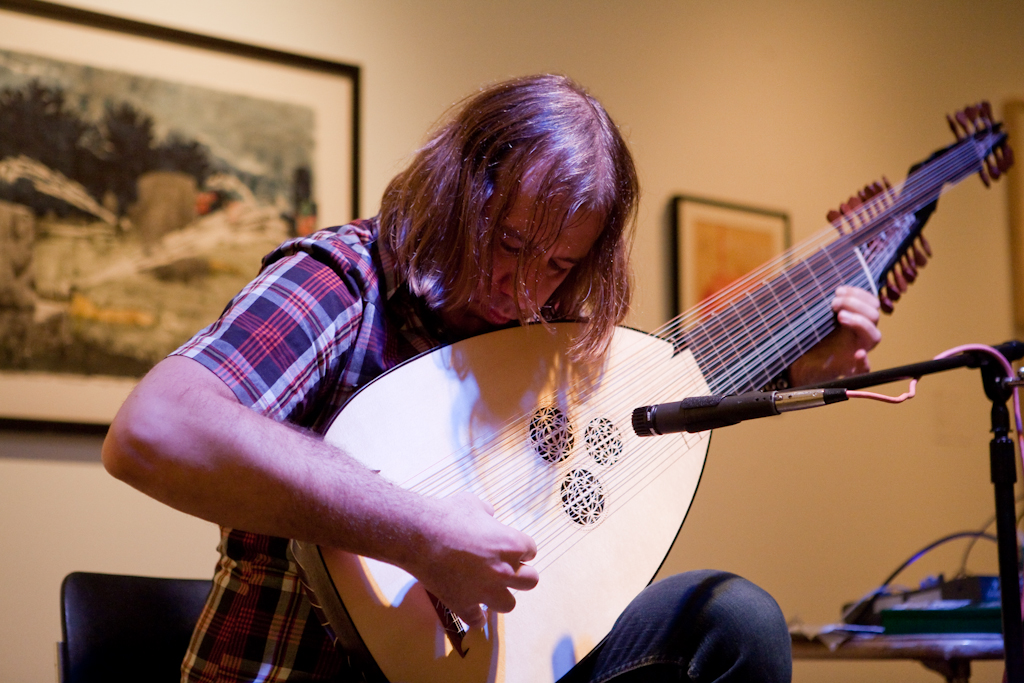
- van Wissem performing at the Mills Gallery in 2009

Background information
- Born: 22 November 1962 (age 63); Maastricht, Netherlands
- Genres: Classical, minimal
- Occupation: Musician
- Instrument: Lute
- Years active: 2000–present
- Labels: The Spring Press; Amish Records; Sacred Bones Records; Important Records; Incunabulum Records; BVHaast Records; Persephone Records
- Website: jozefvanwissem.com

Jozef van Wissem (born 22 November 1962) is a Dutch minimalist composer and lute player In 2013 Van Wissem won the Cannes Soundtrack Award for the score of Only Lovers Left Alive at the Cannes Film Festival.

== Career ==
Jozef van Wissem was born in Maastricht. An incessantly touring musician, Van Wissem studied lute in New York with Patrick O'Brien in the 1990s.

Jozef van Wissem's solo albums, It Is All That Is Made (2009) and Ex Patris (2010), were released on Important Records. He released The Joy That Never Ends, an album with Jim Jarmusch on the label in 2011. He wrote a score for the video game The Sims Medieval.

Van Wissem has earned much critical acclaim for his work, the ‘liberation of the lute’ as he calls it. According to Steve Dollar for the Washington Post,

For him the lute is utterly contemporary. “I want to update it and also make it sexy again. It’s not interesting to a lot of people because it comes with all this baggage, this set of rules that these academics gave the instrument, that keeps it in a museum.” To that end, Van Wissem often performs in rock venues and could easily pass for a Nordic metal overlord, with thigh-high black leather boots and long, dirty-blond hair. Van Wissem can captivate a room on his own, as unafraid of spare beauty as he is of experimental gambits. When he plays the melody’s delicate glimmer freezes the moment, begging the listener to come closer as he steps away from the microphone. Van Wissem holds the instrument in front of his chest as the natural sound resonates inside the lute’s boat-like cavity. He’s not only liberating the lute, as he suggests later, but also asking his audience to liberate themselves from accustomed approaches to music.

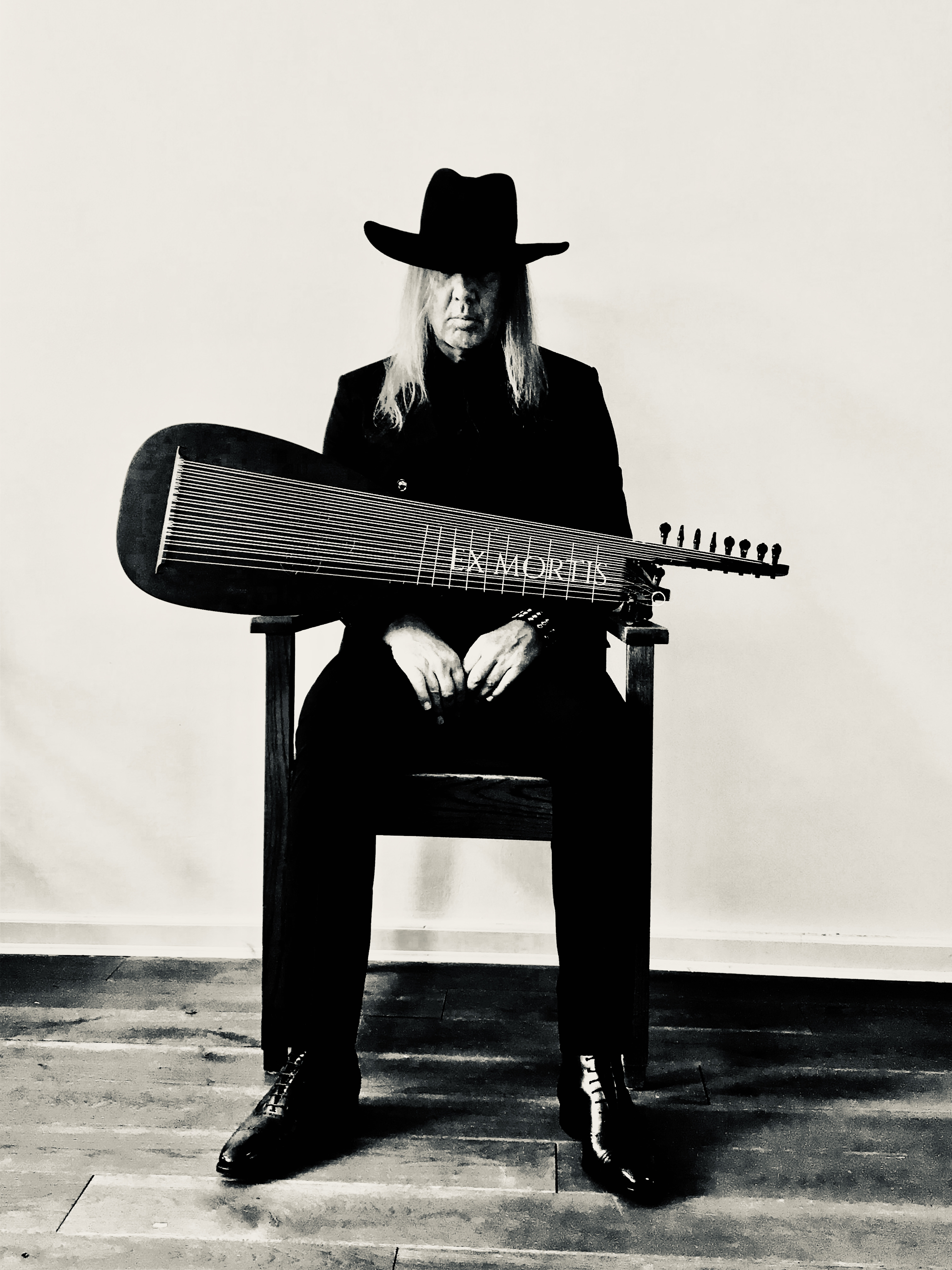
Recent image of the artist

According to The New York Times "Van Wissem is both an avant-garde composer and a baroque lutenist, and thus no stranger to dichotomy". According to Richard Foster in The Quietus, "Van Wissem is possibly the best known lute player in the Western world." In his review of the 2016 album When Shall This Bright Day Begin, Foster said that "To get into Van Wissem’s world is to surrender to the inevitability – and timelessness – of a strange music created at its own pace, in a manner wholly of its creator’s making."

Concerning the Entrance into Eternity, his first collaborative album with Jim Jarmusch, was released on Important Records in early 2012. The Mystery of Heaven, his second collaborative album with Jarmusch, was released on Sacred Bones Records later that year. The More She Burns the More Beautifully She Glows, a track off the album, featured a guest appearance from Tilda Swinton. Van Wissem scored Jarmusch's 2013 film Only Lovers Left Alive . When Shall This Bright Day Begin, featuring guest vocals by Zola Jesus, was released by Consouling Sounds in 2016. The same label released Nobody Living Can Ever Make Me Turn Back in 2017. Van Wissem reactivated Incunabulum for his 2017 release New Lute Music for Film. His third Consouling Sounds release, We Adore You, You Have No Name, followed in 2018. In 2019, Van Wissem and Jarmusch returned to Sacred Bones with the album An Attempt to Draw Aside the Veil. In 2022 his new solo lute and electronics record “ Behold ! I Make All Things New " was announced. Louderthanwar announced his upcoming tour and wrote, Jozef van Wissem is a Dutch lute player who vamps the instrument into the now. His spellbinding atmospheric music has a haunting resonance. "Behold! I Make All Things New “ is all instrumental and consists of sparse works for lute and electronics. There are no vocals this time. It is more a return to the minimal neo-classical style of his early work. It was written and recorded in lockdown in Warsaw and Rotterdam between 2019 and 2021.”. In 2022 four of his compositions were featured in the Irma Vep Series on HBO. His piece " Temple Dance Of The Soul" was featured in the trailer and under the Alica Vikander mirror scene in the series. ” In 2023 Van Wissem scored the Cannes Award winning film Un Prince. He released the soundtrack on his own Incunabulum label in 2024. The New York Times wrote " A subtly medieval score — distinguished by the thrum of a lute and composed by Jozef van Wissem — draws out a surreal dimension. Eventually, the film shifts into explicitly sexual and mythological terrain with a B.D.S.M. edge, and the score keeps pace, taking on a folk metal vibe." According to Chain DLK in 2026: His work for cinema, from "Nosferatu" to "Irma Vep", has consistently demonstrated his ability to treat music as architecture rather than accompaniment, allowing silence, resonance and repetition to shape emotional space with remarkable precision. That cinematic sensibility permeates this latest release, although its landscapes feel intensely inward. Nothing here hurries toward resolution. Time stretches, folds back upon itself and occasionally seems to stop altogether.

== Style and influences ==
According to NPR's All Songs Considered "his compositions are heavy and set in hypnotic darkness". When Van Wissem " started to think about new compositions for lute he made the decision to perform the classical lute repertoire backwards. From this mirror image writing followed the idea to compose in layered palindromes only and repeat them over elongated periods of time. The challenges are the minimalist idea of using only a few chords, one or two tunings, one instrument and then to be interesting within these limits and constraints. And to come up with a simple melody" In December 2017, Van Wissem was commissioned by the Hermitage Museum in St Petersburg to perform the piece "You Know That I Love You' depicted by Caravaggio in his painting The Lute Player (1596) for the event for the final restoration of the painting. Confronted with the sound system, acoustics of the museum, and the number of people in the hall, Van Wissem decided to do a more fluent drone version instead of the classical version" In January 2020 Van Wissem performed in Aalborg, Denmark "in the magnificent baroque interior of the medieval Budolfi church. His pizzicato looks so effortless that the ancient lute with three pegboxes at first seems to be a prop. Occasionally giving a piercing look towards the audience, the musician skillfully steers the course between the past and now. One of the time-travel themes is You Know That I Love You, a 16th-century madrigal by the Renaissance composer Jacques Arcadelt. Three years ago Van Wissem was commissioned to perform this piece at St Petersburg’s Hermitage museum which displays Caravaggio’s The Lute Player which also depicts a young man reading the notes of the same madrigal... The further this lute player travels, the more intense these shamanic charms are. Having performed a few minimalist instrumentals, Van Wissem starts singing. The effect of these enchanting loops is enhanced by the mantra-sounding lines “Do you feel like you want to? Do you ever feel like you want to?”. Later, for the encore, he plays another piece including all-the-more hypnotising lyrics “Love destroys all Evil and frees us” multiplied and intensified.”

In February 2021 Van Wissem premiered a new black Baroque lute on Dutch National TV. The instrument had the Latin words “Ex Mortis” inscribed in the neck. Humo Magazine wrote, “Eight minutes of Jozef van Wissem: the Dutch lute player from New York, who presents his art as a kind of mix between a medieval monk and a Satanist Rasputin. Music that is as cool as it is educative, aired on a Sunday evening at prime time, quite special.“

On March 24, 2022, The New York Times wrote about Van Wissem's score for the Nosferatu horror film. "In May, Jozef van Wissem, a Dutch composer and avant-garde lute player known for his collaborations with the film director Jim Jarmusch, will perform a live score at a “Nosferatu” screening at a large church in Belfast, Northern Ireland. Beginning with a solo played on the lute, his performance will incorporate electric guitar and distorted recordings of extinct birds, graduating from subtlety to gothic horror. “My soundtrack goes from silence to noise over the course of 90 minutes,” he said, culminating in “dense, slow death metal.”. Later that year it was announced the soundtrack entitled " Nosferatu, The Call Of The Deathbird " was to be self- released on Halloween 2022 on Incunabulum Records.” The following year, Van Wissem re-teamed with Jarmusch for American Landscapes. That year he also provided an award-winning original score to Pierre Creton's film A Prince. In January 2024, Van Wissem issued the solo single "With Our Hands Our Hearts to Raise," and followed it with the long-player The Night Dwells in the Day two weeks later.

According to Bill Meyer in The Chicago Reader,

"The Lute is Eternal” proclaims the text that concludes theten-minute video to Jozef van Wissem’s recent single, “The Call of the Deathbird.”, shot in the vast Soviet mausoleum outside Warsaw, but his singing directs the listener back to the intricate, meditative sounds of his main ax. [...] The lute may be eternal, but it’s not the only instrument in van Wissem’s music. On The Night Dwells in the Day, the first of two albums he’s released this year, he bolsters the lute’s delicate progress through the palindromic melodic structures of his compositions using sequenced beats, subliminal electronic drones, and stern intonations.

In 2025 he did a successful world tour in duo with Jim Jarmusch and released their fifth record The Day The Angels Cried on Incunabulum Records. Van Wissem said "We can go from darkly beautiful, even elegant things to some pretty metal sounds, especially at the climax of these recent shows when I trade the amplified lute for a 12-string guitar". In 2025 he premiered his new live score for The Cabinet Of Dr. Caligari (1920). "His soundtrack consists of an ambient background, occasionally interspersed with market sounds and other scenes from the film. The Dutch lutenist performs this seemingly simple material, but each time he adds a new layer and subtly builds repetitive patterns. He holds the audience in a hypnotic grip. The tension regularly mounts, and in a chase scene, for example, the nervousness of the rapid arpeggios drive us to the edge of our seats. Towards the end, Van Wissem trades his jet-black lute for an electric guitar. The volume is cranked up, and with a single chord (and a lot of feedback), the intensity explodes. Yet, his musical approach relies more on a minimalist than an exuberantly expressionistic one. This makes everything a bit more mysterious, which fits perfectly with the occult, hallucinatory imagery of The Cabinet of Dr. Caligari."

In May 2026 he released a new solo album entitled “ This Is My Blood”, a red vinyl edition on Incunabulum Records. The first and last pieces on the album are improvised slide compositions using the bottleneck. In an interview in The Guardian Van Wissem stated “When I do this at a show, the first people who leave are the classical people. They can’t stand it. The experimental music people love it. I think people in academic circles are still hiding the lute, they demean it in a way.” Van Wissem sees his mission as one of making it “a real pop instrument again”, and stating that before its 250-year “disappearance” the lute was “omnipresent”, as likely to be found in brothels and taverns as at court.

== Discography ==
=== Solo albums ===
- Retrograde: A Classical Deconstruction (2000, Persephone)
- Narcissus Drowning (2002, Persephone)
- Simulacrum (2003, BVHaast)
- Objects in Mirror Are Closer Than They Appear (2005, BVHaast)
- A Rose by Any Other Name: Anonymous Lute Solos of the Golden Age (2006, Incunabulum)
- Stations of the Cross (2007, Incunabulum)
- A Priori (2008, Incunabulum)
- It Is All That Is Made (2009, Important Records)
- Ex Patris (2010, Important Records)
- The Joy That Never Ends (2011, Important Records)
- Arcana Coelestia (2012, The Spring Press)
- Nihil Obstat (2013, Important Records)
- It Is Time For You To Return (2014, Crammed Discs)
- Partir to Live (2015, Sacred Bones)
- When Shall This Bright Day Begin (2016, Consouling Sounds)
- New Lute Music For Film (2017, Incunabulum)
- Nobody Living Can Ever Make Me Turn Back (2017, Consouling Sounds)
- We Adore You, You Have No Name (2018, Consouling Sounds)
- Ex Mortis (2020, Consouling Sounds)
- Behold, I Make All Things New (2022, Incunabulum)
- Nosferatu, The Call Of The Deathbird (2022, Incunabulum)
- The Night Dwells in the Day (2024, Incunabulum)
- Un Prince, Original Soundtrack (2024, Incunabulum)
- 'This Is My Blood (2026, Incunabulum)

=== Singles ===
- "The Day Is Coming" (live in Rouen 2015) Phonographic Cylinder (2017), Disordered - private press

=== Collaborative albums ===
- Diplopia (2003, BVHaast) with Gary Lucas
- Proletarian Drift (2004, BVHaast) with Tetuzi Akiyama
- The Universe of Absence (2004, BVHaast) with Gary Lucas
- Das Platinzeitalter (2007, Incunabulum) with Maurizio Bianchi
- Hymn for a Fallen Angel (2007, Incunabulum) with Tetuzi Akiyama
- All Things Are from Him, Through Him and in Him (2008, Audiomer) as Brethren of the Free Spirit
- The Wolf Also Shall Dwell with the Lamb (2008, Important Records) as Brethren of the Free Spirit
- Suite the Hen's Teeth (2010, Incunabulum) with Smegma
- Downland (2010, Incunabulum) with United Bible Studies
- A Prayer for Light (2010, Incunabulum) with Heresy of the Free Spirit
- Concerning the Entrance into Eternity (2012, Important Records) with Jim Jarmusch
- The Mystery of Heaven (2012, Sacred Bones Records) with Jim Jarmusch and Tilda Swinton
- Apokatastasis (2012, Incunabulum) featuring Jim Jarmusch
- Only Lovers Left Alive (2014, Atp Recordings) with Zola Jesus and Sqürl
- An Attempt to Draw Aside the Veil (2019, Sacred Bones Records) with Jim Jarmusch
- American Landscapes (2023, Incunabulum Records) with Jim Jarmusch
- The Day The Angels Cried (2025, Incunabulum Records) with Jim Jarmusch

=== Compilation appearances ===
- "The Mirror of Eternal Light" on The Garden of Forking Paths (2007), Important Records
- "This Is How We Sing" on New Music for Old Instruments (with Jon Mueller and Robbie Lee) (2012), Incunabulum
- "Prayer of Quiet" on New Music for Old Instruments (with Keiji Haino) (2012), Incunabulum
- "The Mystery of Heaven" on Todo Muere Volume 3 (with Jim Jarmusch) (2013), Sacred Bones Records
- "The Call of the First Æthyr" on Black Magic (with Aleister Crowley) (2021), Cleopatra Records
