= Fushitsusha =

Japanese rock band

- Origin: Tokyo, Japan
- Genres: Psychedelic rock Space rock Experimental rock Japanoise
- Years active: 1978–2005, 2012–present
- Labels: PSF; Avant; Tokuma; Purple Trap; Blast First; Table of the Elements
- Members: Keiji Haino (guitar, vocals); Ryosuke Kiyasu (drums); Yasumune Morishige (bass)
- Past members: Chiyo Kamekawa (bass); Tamio Shiraishi (synthesizer); Jun Hamano (bass); Shuhei Takashima (drums); Maki Miura (guitar); Yasushi Ozawa (bass); Jun Kosugi (drums); Ikuro Takahashi (drums); Mitsuru Nasuno (bass)

Fushitsusha (不失者) is a Japanese rock band specialising in experimental and psychedelic rock genres. The band consists of guitarist and singer Keiji Haino, and a shifting cast of complementary musicians. The group released the majority of its material in the 1990s.

== History ==
Haino formed Fushitsusha in 1978, although their first LP was not released until 1989. The band initially consisted of Haino on guitar and vocals, and Tamio Shiraishi on synthesizer. After the departure of Shiraishi, Ayuo joined briefly in 1979 before Fushitsusha became a trio with the addition of Jun Hamano (bass) and Shuhei Takashima (drums). The lineup soon changed, adding Yasushi Ozawa (bass) and Jun Kosugi (drums) throughout the 1990s. Their 1993 album Allegorical Misunderstanding was released on John Zorn's record label, Avant, although most of their albums have come out on independent label PSF and on major label Tokuma.

Fushitsusha recently returned to duo status, with Haino supplementing percussion with tape loops, though the band is believed to have been on hiatus since the early to mid 2000s

In February 2008, longtime bassist Yasushi Ozawa died.

In August 2015, bassist Chiyo Kamekawa was dismissed because he plays in another band MANNERS. Later, Yasumune Morishige joined as a bassist.

In 2018, Mitsuru Nasuno joined as a bassist.

== Music ==
The band's sound is influenced by German krautrock bands of the 1970s and British psychedelic music of the 1960s and 1970s. They are generally considered part of the Japanese psychedelic music scene alongside bands like Ghost and Acid Mothers Temple. Their music occasionally ventures to the more aggressive "Japanoise" end of the sonic spectrum, but usually remains haunting and contemplative.

== Discography ==
=== Studio albums ===
Year	Album name	Album details
1993	Allegorical Misunderstanding	Label: Avant Records; Format: CD
1994	悲愴 (aka Hisou / Pathétique / 4)	Label: P.S.F. Records; Format: CD
1995	The Caution Appears	Label: Les Disques Du Soleil Et De L'Acier; Format: CD
1997	A Death Never to Be Complete	Label: Tokuma Japan Communications; Format: CD
1997	The Time Is Nigh	Label: Tokuma Japan Communications; Format: CD
1998	A Little Longer Thus	Label: Tokuma Japan Communications; Format: CD
1998	The Wisdom Prepared	Label: Tokuma Japan Communications; Format: CD
2000	I Saw It! That Which Before I Could Only Sense...	Label: Paratactile; Format: CD
2001	Origin's Hesitation	Label: P.S.F. Records; Format: CD
2012	Hikari To Nazukeyou	Label: Heartfast; Format: CD
2012	Mabushii Itazura na Inori	Label: Heartfast; Format: CD
2013	名前をつけないでほしい名前をつけてしまうと全てでなくなってしまうから	Label: Heartfast; Format: CD
2013	まだ温かいうちのこの今に全ての謎を注ぎ込んでしまおう	Label: Heartfast; Format: CD

=== Live albums ===
Year	Album name	Album details
1989	Radio Code	Label: No label; Format: Cassette; Live radio recordings in Amsterdam from 1988 to 1989
1989	1st	Label: P.S.F. Records; Format: Vinyl LP, CD (1997 reissue)
1991	Fushitsusha	Label: P.S.F. Records; Format: CD
1996	Purple Trap (The Wound That Was Given Birth to Must Be Bigger Than the Wound That Gave Birth)	Label: Blast First; Format: CD; Recorded live in London
1998	Withdrawe, This Sable Disclosure Ere Devot'd	Label: Victo; Format: CD; Live in Victoriaville, Canada, 16 May 1997
1998	Gold Blood	Label: Charnel Music; Format: CD; Live in San Francisco, U.S.A., 7 November 1996
2003	It Was Eternity That Reached Out First	Label: P.S.F. Records; Format: CD; Live recording from 1978
2013	Live at Freedommune 0 <Zero> a New Zero 2012	Format: Digital file
2014	Nothing Changes. No One Can Change Anything. I Am Ever-Changing. Only You Can Change Yourself .	Label: Utech; Format: CD; Recorded in 1996, featuring Peter Brötzmann

== Filmography ==
- 1991.9.26 – VHS (1992) (Reissued on DVD, 2006)
