= Maher Shalal Hash Baz (band) =

Japanese band

- Origin: Japan
- Genres: Avant-garde; art rock; free improvisation
- Years active: 1984–present
- Members: Tori Kudo; Reiko Kudo; Hiroo Nakazaki rotating ensemble

Maher Shalal Hash Baz is a Japanese music ensemble based in Japan, and the artistic alter ego of Tori Kudo, a Japanese composer and musician.

== Name ==
The name is taken from Maher-shalal-hash-baz in the Book of Isaiah verses 8:1 and 8:3, and translates roughly as "Hurrying to the spoil, he has made haste to the plunder." Maher-Shalal-Hash-Baz is also mentioned in the Book of Mormon in verses 2 Ne 18:1 and 18:3.

Tori Kudo has been evasive about details of his life before Maher Shalal Hash Baz. He was once a member of a political party in Japan, although he has dissociated himself from politics since joining the Jehovah's Witnesses. He also works as a ceramicist.

He claims to have played classical and jazz piano, as well as playing organ in a Protestant church. His other musical influences included T.Rex and saxophonist Steve Lacy. He and his wife Reiko Kudo joined a band called Worst Noise when they moved to Tokyo; other members dropped out, leaving Tori and Reiko as a duo, known simply as Noise. Under this name they released an album called Tenno (English translation - Emperor).

The impetus for Maher Shalal Hash Baz came when Tori met euphonium player Hiroo Nakazaki on a building site, and found that they shared an interest in the music of Mayo Thompson and Syd Barrett. Apart from the core trio (Tori on guitar and vocals, Reiko as vocalist, Hiroo with his euphonium), the lineup has always been fluid. After a couple of self-released cassette albums, the Japanese Org label released Maher Goes To Gothic Country (1991) and the 83-track box set Return Visit to Rock Mass (1996).

The group's profile outside Japan became much higher when Stephen McRobbie of The Pastels signed them to his Geographic label. They have released two albums on Geographic: the compilation From a Summer to Another Summer (An Egypt to Another Egypt) (2000) and the 41-track Blues Du Jour (2003); plus a number of EPs on various labels, including Souvenir De Mauve (Majikick, 1999), Maher On Water (Geographic, 2002), Faux Depart (Yik Yak, 2003) and Live Aoiheya January 2003 (Chapter Music, 2005).

Tori Kudo has resisted defining the sound of his band, although in an interview with Tim Footman in Careless Talk Costs Lives magazine (August 2002) he declared: "I am punk." There are also elements of folk, psychedelia and free jazz; the band's tendency to ask members of the audience to join in adds a sense of "danger" in live performance. Perhaps the best description comes from his own sleeve notes to From a Summer to Another Summer: "Error in performance dominates MSHB cassette which is like our imperfect life."

== Discography ==
=== Maher Shalal Hash Baz ===
- "Maher Goes to Gothic Country" (Org; 1991)
- "Return Visit to Rock Mass" (Org; 1996; 83 Track Box-Set)
- "Souvenir De Mauve" (Majikick; 1999; EP)
- "From a Summer to Another Summer (An Egypt to Another Egypt)" (Geographic; 2000; 2-LP)
- Maher Shalal Hash Baz / The Curtains - "Make Us Two Crayons on the Floor" (Yik Yak; 2000; CD)
- "Maher on Water" (Geographic; 2002; 10-inch / Cd-Single)
- "Blues Du Jour" (Geographic; 2003; CD / LP)
- "Open Field" (Geographic; 2003; CD-Single)
- "Faux Depart" (Yik Yak, 2004)
- "Ethiopia" (life affair trust music, 2004; cdr single)
- "These Songs" (incerta, 2004; cdr)
- "Live Aoiheya January 2003" (Chapter Music; 2005; Mini-CD)
- "Maher Kunitachi Kibun Live 1984-85" (PSF; 2006; CD)
- "L'Autre Cap" (K; 2007; CD / LP)
- "C'est La Dernière Chanson" (K; 2009; 2-CD)
- "Hello New York" (OSR; 2016; LP / CD)
- "Share"

=== Bill Wells & Maher Shalal Hash Baz ===
- "How's Your Bassoon, Turquirs" (Geographic; 2006; 7-inch)
- "Osaka Bridge" (Karaoke Kalk; 2006; CD / LP)
- "Gok" (Geographic; 2009; CD)
