= Only Lovers Left Alive (soundtrack) =

Soundtrack album by SQÜRL and Jozef van Wissem
- Released: 17 February 2014
- Recorded: 2013
- Studio: Treefort Studios, Brooklyn, New York; SMT Studios, New York City
- Genre: Soundtrack
- Length: 48:13
- Label: ATP Recordings

Only Lovers Left Alive is the soundtrack to the 2014 film of the same name directed by Jim Jarmusch and starring Tilda Swinton, Tom Hiddleston, Mia Wasikowska, Anton Yelchin, Jeffrey Wright, Slimane Dazi and John Hurt. The soundtrack featured original music from Jarmusch's band SQÜRL and Jozef van Wissem, and was released through ATP Recordings on 17 February 2014. It won the Cannes Soundtrack Award at the 2013 Cannes Film Festival.

== Background and development ==
The film score was primarily written by Jarmusch's band SQÜRL and Dutch lute player Jozef van Wissem. As Jarmusch had had the idea of a vampire playing lute for five years, he asked van Wissem to play lute for the film. Their discussions about the script and the history of composers were translated into the film and Jarmusch asked Van Wissen to do the soundtrack. Van Wissem noted that Jarmusch makes his films as kind of a musician, where he had the music in his mind while writing the script and the film's tone was set with the musical pieces. Van Wissem also described the film as "a very personal film, maybe even autobiographical" and that "Jim is a cultural sponge, he absorbs everything".

Van Wissem wrote a few pieces during the summer of 2012 without watching the film. Most of the pieces were curated from his ideas that would fit in the film. After giving them to Jarmusch they both went into the studio where they added drums and guitar. Jarmusch's band SQÜRL also worked on the music, providing a balance between the "really stark pieces and then the rock side". Most of the pieces which they included in the film were either in their full form or combined with other instruments. Van Wissem played the electric guitar, 12-string and lute, while Jarmusch controlled the feedback.

The songs they put in stemmed from Jarmusch's decisions. He also added a few pieces of the score, where one of them is for a scene where Christopher Marlowe (John Hurt) plays William Shakespeare and discusses the "sick" passage from Much Ado About Nothing. The piece in the conclusion where the characters drive through Detroit was a classical prelude which Jarmusch played backwards, creating a palindrome. Van Wissem also sang a pseudo-Gregorian chant, which he sent to singer-songwriter Zola Jesus for overdubbing. A piece "Hal" was performed by Lebanese vocalist Yasmine Hamdan.

A concert was held at the Santos Party House venue in New York City in April 2014 to celebrate the film's release. During the Santos event, Jesus performed with van Wissem in both a "pseudo-Gregorian" piece from the film's soundtrack and an unrecorded collaboration. In the United States, the album was released digitally and in limited edition red and white vinyl LPs through Sacred Bones Records in 2021.

== Reception ==
Justin Velucci of Spectrum Culture wrote "Moody and evocative, with influences and histories that seem quite intentionally difficult to pin down – much like the lovelorn characters in Jarmusch's film." Peter Aaron of Chronogram wrote "Bleak, sexy, and haunting as hell, it's an aural opus that you totally need on your shelf as we head into another cabin-bound Hudson Valley winter." Jonathan Romney of The Guardian wrote "Jarmusch's band SQÜRL compose the score, together with experimental lute player Jozef van Wissem, and there's a show-stealing, intensely sexual live number by Lebanese singer Yasmine Hamdan."

His other review for the Screen International, stated "the music is as idiosyncratic as ever with Jarmusch, comprising stately music from avant-lutenist Josef van Wissem, noise-rock from Jarmusch's own band Sqürl, and among other pieces, a great Denise la Salle soul ballad and a show-stopping turn from Lebanese singer Yasmine Hamdan." Grace Gordon of The Oklahoman called it a "soporific soundtrack". Aneet Nijjar of AllMusic wrote "Providing the doom-fuzzy riffs of Adam's band in the movie, Jarmusch crafts his epic score primarily with Dutch composer Jozef van Wissem, who in turn churns out atmospheric stoner riffs, gliding minimal orchestral strokes, and bewitching vocal chants."

Leslie Felperin of Variety wrote "Jarmusch brings the film to a stop too often to show off his taste in slightly recherche music from all over the world, even if the tracks will collectively make for an interesting soundtrack album." Sheri Linden of Los Angeles Times called it a "plangent score". Raffi Asdourian of The Film Stage wrote "the music by Jozef Van Wissem is rapturous, encapsulating an end of the world type vibe."

== Track listing ==
Detroit
No.	Title	Artist(s)	Length
1.	"Streets of Detroit"	SQÜRL	0:35
2.	"Funnel of Love"	SQÜRL	3:40
3.	"Sola Gratia" (Part 1)	Jozef van Wissem; SQÜRL	3:24
4.	"The Taste of Blood"	Jozef van Wissem; SQÜRL	5:49
5.	"Diamond Star"	SQÜRL	1:14
6.	"Please Feel Free to Piss in the Garden"	SQÜRL	4:20
7.	"Spooky Action at a Distance"	SQÜRL	3:34
Total length:			22:36

Tangier
No.	Title	Artist(s)	Length
8.	"Streets of Tangier"	Jozef van Wissem; SQÜRL	1:35
9.	"In Templum Dei"	Jozef van Wissem	2:56
10.	"Sola Gratia" (Part 2)	Jozef van Wissem; SQÜRL	5:09
11.	"Our Hearts Condemn Us"	Jozef van Wissem	4:35
12.	"Hal"	Yasmine Hamdan	4:29
13.	"Only Lovers Left Alive"	Jozef van Wissem; SQÜRL	3:31
14.	"This Is Your Wilderness"	Jozef van Wissem; SQÜRL	3:51
Total length:			25:37

== Additional music ==
List of songs featured in the film:

- "Funnel of Love" – Wanda Jackson
- "Harissa" – Kasbah Rockers
- "Caprice No. 5 in A Minor" – Charles Yang (composed by Niccolò Paganini)
- "Gamil" – Y.A.S.
- "Can't Hardly Stand It" – Charlie Feathers
- "Trapped By a Thing Called Love" – Denise LaSalle
- "Soul Dracula" – Hot Blood
- "Under Skin Or By Name" – White Hills
- "Red Eyes and Tears" – Black Rebel Motorcycle Club
- "Little Village" – Bill Laswell
- "Hal" – Yasmine Hamdan

== Awards ==
Award	Category	Recipients and nominees	Result	Ref(s)
Cannes Film Festival	Soundtrack Award	—N/a	Won	
