= Ya Nass =

Studio album by Yasmine Hamdan
- Released: 2013
- Genres: Electronic, pop
- Length: 45:56
- Label: Kwaidan / Crammed Discs
- Producer: Marc Collin

Yasmine Hamdan chronology
Arabology (2009)	Ya Nass (2013)	Al Jamilat (2017)

Ya Nass is the debut solo album by the Lebanese singer Yasmine Hamdan, previously a member of the band Soap Kills and one half of the duo Y.A.S. The album was originally given a limited release, in France and Lebanon, on the French Kwaidan label in 2012, under the title Yasmine Hamdan. It was released internationally by Crammed Discs in April 2013, under the title Ya Nass, featuring five new songs. It was produced by Marc Collin, best known for his new wave covers project Nouvelle Vague.

== Overview ==
The album's title translates from Arabic as "Hey People". Hamdan has described the album as being influenced by the Arab Spring uprisings of 2010, "Ya Nass is a like an invitation, a call to a single person or a crowd ... It could be an echo of the movements that are taking place in the Arab world." She added, "At first when the revolutions started I felt very stimulated and free, I felt that the youth had at last begun to have a voice. But I also know that these things take time and that the situation in the region is complicated."

The album features a mixture of original compositions and reworkings of older songs from the 1930s and 1940s, including songs by the Egyptian composer Mohammed Abdel Wahab and the singer Leila Mourad. It also includes the song "Hal", which Hamdan performs in the vampire film Only Lovers Left Alive (2013), directed by Jim Jarmusch. Hamdan wrote the song for the film; the lyrics concern a woman who complains about "a vampirising love affair".

== Critical reception ==
Professional ratings
Review scores
Source	Rating
The Guardian	4/5 stars
Les Inrockuptibles	3.5/5 stars
NPR	(favourable)
The Observer	4/5 stars
PopMatters	6/10 stars
Télérama	(favourable)

The album received generally positive reviews. The Guardian wrote, "She has a sultry, seductive voice and gift for melody that is reminiscent of Souad Massi, and her best songs rely on acoustic guitar rather than the swirling synths." NPR's reviewer described Hamdan as "one of the most free-thinking and inventive artists singing in Arabic today," and said of the album that it "is full of ... subtle references to the past, but you don't need to understand them to appreciate the songs."

== Track listing ==
=== Track listing ===
All tracks are written by Yasmine Hamdan and Marc Collin, except where noted.

Yasmine Hamdan - 1st Issue by Kwaidan Records
No.	Title	Writer(s)	Producer(s)	Length
1.	"In Kan Fouadi"	Ahmed Ramy; Zakaria Ahmed	Marc Collin; Hamdan
2.	"Beirut"	Omar el Zenni	Collin
3.	"Samar"		Collin
4.	"Baaden"	Hamdan; Collin; Juna Suleiman	Collin
5.	"Ya Nass"	Hamdan; Collin; Traditional	Collin
6.	"Irss"	Hamdan; Collin; Traditional	Collin
7.	"Nediya"	Hamdan; Collin; Traditional	Collin
8.	"Nag"	Hamdan; Collin; Kevin Seddiki	Collin
9.	"Shouei"	Zeid Hamdan; Collin; Seddiki	Collin
10.	"La Mouch"	Hussein El Sayed; Mohamed Abdel Wahab	Collin
11.	"Bala Tantanat"	Hamdan; Seddiki; El Zenni	Collin
12.	"Zarani" (pre-order only)		Collin
13.	"Khalass" (pre-order only)		Collin

All tracks are written by Yasmine Hamdan and Marc Collin, except where noted.

Ya Nass - 2nd Issue by Crammed Discs
No.	Title	Writer(s)	Producer(s)	Length
1.	"Deny"		Marc Collin
2.	"Shouei"	Zeid Hamdan; Collin; Seddiki	Collin
3.	"Samar"		Collin
4.	"Enta Fen, Again"	Hamdan	Gael Rakotondrabe
5.	"La Mouch"	Hussein El Sayed; Mohamed Abdel Wahab	Collin
6.	"Nediya"	Hamdan; Collin; Traditional	Collin
7.	"Beirut"	Omar el Zenni	Collin
8.	"Aleb"	Hamdan; Collin; Kevin Seddiki	Collin
9.	"Bala Tantanat"	Hamdan; Seddiki; El Zenni	Collin
10.	"In Kan Fouadi"	Ahmed Ramy; Zakaria Ahmed	Collin; Hamdan
11.	"Hal"	Hamdan	Hamdan
12.	"Khayam"		Collin
13.	"Ya Nass"	Hamdan; Collin; Traditional	Collin
14.	"Zarani" (pre-order only)		Collin
15.	"Khalass" (pre-order only)		Collin
