= Introduction to the End of an Argument =

- مقدمة لنهايات جدال (Intifada - Speaking for Oneself... Speaking for Others)
- Directed by: Jayce Salloum; Elia Suleiman
- Release date: 1990
- Running time: 41 mins

Introduction to the End of an Argument / Intifada - Speaking for Oneself... Speaking for Others (Arabic: مقدمة لنهائيات جدال Transliteration: Muqadimmah Li-Nihāyāt Jidāl) is a 1990 experimental documentary directed by Jayce Salloum and Elia Suleiman. It utilises found footage sourced from films, news footage, documentaries and 'live' footage from the West Bank and Gaza to critique the representation of Palestinians, Arabs and the Middle East frequently found in Western media.

== Synopsis ==
Footage from newsreels, feature films and documentaries are woven together, loosely organised by title cards, such as 'INTIFADA', 'SPEAKING FOR ONESELF', and 'ABSENCE'. The film juxtaposes news footage focusing on the Israeli-Palestinian conflict with orientalist and racist portrayals of Arabs in the history of cinema, in order to highlight the argument over narratives that exists within the media when discussing the Middle East and Palestine in particular.

== Films referenced ==
- Harum Scarum (film)
- Exodus (1960 film)
- Lawrence of Arabia (film)
- The Battle of Algiers (film)
- The Sheik (film)

== See also ==
- Mashup (video)
- Scratch video
