= Only Lovers Left Alive =

2013 film by Jim Jarmusch

- Theatrical release poster
- Directed by: Jim Jarmusch
- Written by: Jim Jarmusch
- Produced by: Jeremy Thomas; Reinhard Brundig
- Starring: Tilda Swinton; Tom Hiddleston; Mia Wasikowska; Anton Yelchin; Jeffrey Wright; Slimane Dazi; John Hurt
- Cinematography: Yorick Le Saux
- Edited by: Affonso Gonçalves
- Music by: Jozef van Wissem; Yasmine Hamdan; Sqürl
- Production companies: Recorded Picture Company; Pandora Film
- Distributed by: Soda Pictures (United Kingdom); Pandora Film Verleih (Germany)
- Release dates: 25 May 2013 (Cannes); 25 December 2013 (Germany); 21 February 2014 (United Kingdom)
- Running time: 123 minutes
- Countries: United Kingdom; Germany
- Language: English
- Budget: $7 million
- Box office: $8.2 million

Only Lovers Left Alive is a 2013 Gothic fantasy drama film written and directed by Jim Jarmusch, starring Tilda Swinton, Tom Hiddleston, Mia Wasikowska, Anton Yelchin, Jeffrey Wright, Slimane Dazi and John Hurt. An international co-production between the United Kingdom and Germany, the film focuses on the romance between two vampires and was nominated for the Palme d'Or at the 2013 Cannes Film Festival.

In 2016, the film was ranked among the BBC's 100 Greatest Films of the 21st Century by 177 critics around the world. In late 2019, it was named the fourth greatest film of the 2010s by The Hollywood Reporter's chief film critic Todd McCarthy.

== Plot ==
Married for centuries and now living half a world apart, two vampires wake as the sun goes down. Adam sits holding a lute, in his cluttered Detroit Victorian mansion, as Eve wakes up in her bedroom in Tangier, surrounded by books. Rather than feeding on humans directly, they are dependent on local suppliers of the "good stuff", for fear of blood contaminated by the 21st-century environment. Adam, still a famous musician, also fears exposure, visiting a local blood bank in the dead of night in disguise as "Dr. Faust", bribing "Dr. Watson" for his coveted O negative. Eve relies on their old friend, the author Christopher Marlowe, who faked his death in 1593 and now lives under the protection of a protégé.

Despite having influenced the careers of countless famous musicians and scientists, Adam has become withdrawn and suicidal. His desire to reconnect through his music is at odds with the danger of recognition as well as his contempt for the corrupt and foolish humans he refers to as "zombies". He spends his nights recording his compositions on outdated studio equipment and lamenting the state of the modern world, while collecting vintage instruments.

Adam pays Ian, a naïve young music fan, to procure vintage guitars and other assorted curiosities, including a custom-made wooden bullet with a brass casing he thinks of using to kill himself. Having acquired much scientific knowledge over the years, Adam has built contraptions to power his home using technology originally pioneered by Nikola Tesla. His reclusive nature adds to his mystique as a musician and composer; he is upset when some intrepid fans turn up on his doorstep. Ian promises to discreetly spread rumors about Adam living elsewhere to draw them away.

When Eve phones, she recognizes Adam is despondent and decides to come to Detroit to comfort him. Soon after she arrives, Adam goes out for more blood, and she discovers his revolver hidden under the bed with the wooden bullet. Her vampire senses reveal to her that the bullet is new, and she becomes worried. Eve confronts Adam when he returns, chiding him for wasting the life and opportunities he has to enjoy and appreciate the good things in the world, as well as their relationship. They spend their nights cruising the empty streets of Detroit, listening to music, and playing chess.

The couple's idyll is shattered by the arrival of Eve's younger sister, Ava, who gorges herself on their stash of the "good stuff". Hungry for excitement, Ava persuades them to go out to a local club with Ian, where they hear Adam's music played by the band White Hills. Ava offers Ian a hit off the flask she secretly filled with blood and brought to the club, but Adam snatches it from her with supernatural speed and insists they leave. Before dawn, Ava accidentally kills Ian by drinking too much of his blood, for which Adam throws her out of the house.

Adam and Eve dispose of Ian's corpse in an acid pool in an abandoned factory. Ian's murder and the appearance of another group of Adam's fans at the house compel the couple to hastily return to Tangier with only what they can carry onto the plane. Desperately hungry, they visit Marlowe and learn that their old friend and mentor has been poisoned by accidentally drinking contaminated blood. They reminisce with Marlowe about his long ruse, successfully hiding that he was the true author of most of William Shakespeare's plays, before he dies.

The couple return to the streets with the last flask of the "good stuff." When Eve takes Adam's cash and promises to return with a gift, he is captivated by the music from a nearby club, where Lebanese singer Yasmine Hamdan is finishing a haunting song. Eve reappears with a beautiful oud, and as they sit together contemplating their likely demise, they spot a pair of young lovers kissing. Adam and Eve approach the young couple with their fangs out.

== Cast ==
- Tilda Swinton as Eve
- Tom Hiddleston as Adam
- Mia Wasikowska as Ava
- Anton Yelchin as Ian
- Jeffrey Wright as Dr. Watson
- Slimane Dazi as Bilal
- John Hurt as Christopher Marlowe
- Yasmine Hamdan as Yasmine
- White Hills as themselves

== Production ==
In August 2010, Jarmusch said that Tilda Swinton, Michael Fassbender, Mia Wasikowska, and John Hurt had agreed to join the film, described by Jarmusch in May 2011 as a "crypto-vampire love story," but said that he did not have financing yet. Financing the film was a difficult process for the director and he explained at the world premiere at the Cannes International Film Festival in May 2013 that "it's getting more and more difficult for films that are a little unusual, or not predictable, or don't satisfy people's expectations of something."

Jarmusch revealed in 2014 that, after seven years of frustration, Swinton said "that's good news, it means that now is not the time. It will happen when it needs to happen." Jarmusch eventually received a US$7 million budget from the German NRW Filmstiftung (de). Producer Jeremy Thomas later said that Jarmusch is "one of the great American independent filmmakers – he's the last of the line. People are not coming through like that any more."

In January 2012, Tom Hiddleston replaced Fassbender prior to filming. Shooting began that June in numerous locations, the Brush Park district of Detroit, Michigan, U.S., Tangier, Morocco, Hamburg and Cologne in Germany. Filming lasted seven weeks.

The film is one of several Jarmusch productions, with films such as Night on Earth, in which the action mainly occurs at night. Swinton said after the film's release that "Jim is pretty much nocturnal, so the nightscape is pretty much his palette. There's something about things glowing in the darkness that feels to me really Jim Jarmusch. He's a rock star."

== Soundtrack ==
Jarmusch's band Sqürl, primarily responsible for the film's score, opens the film with a version of Wanda Jackson's 1961 song "Funnel of Love." Other contributors to the soundtrack are Zola Jesus and Lebanese vocalist Yasmine Hamdan, while Dutch lute player Jozef van Wissem's compositions formed the core of the film's aural aesthetic. During the week of the soundtrack album's release, in April 2014, Van Wissem explained:

I know the way [Jarmusch] makes his films is kind of like a musician. He has music in his head when he's writing a script so it's more informed by a tonal thing than it is by anything else ... I feel that I'm sort of political. Jim's film is anti-contemporary-society. And the lute goes against all technology and against all computers and against all the crap you don't need.

Van Wissem also described the film as "a very personal film, maybe even autobiographical" and that "Jim is a cultural sponge, he absorbs everything." A concert was held at the Santos Party House venue in New York City in April 2014 to celebrate the release of Jarmusch's eleventh feature film. During the Santos event, Jesus performed with van Wissem on both a "pseudo-Gregorian" piece from the film's soundtrack and an unrecorded collaboration.

The list of songs:

- "Funnel of Love" – Wanda Jackson
- "Harissa" – Kasbah Rockers
- "Caprice No. 5 in A Minor" – Charles Yang (composed by Niccolò Paganini)
- "Gamil" – Y.A.S.
- "Can't Hardly Stand It" – Charlie Feathers
- "Trapped By a Thing Called Love" – Denise LaSalle
- "Soul Dracula" – Hot Blood
- "Under Skin Or By Name" – White Hills
- "Red Eyes and Tears" – Black Rebel Motorcycle Club
- "Little Village" – Bill Laswell
- "Hal" – Yasmine Hamdan

== Cultural references ==
Jarmusch not only sees himself as a "film nerd," but he has also been called "a cultural sponge" by van Wissem. This film is full of cultural references and therefore it has been praised as "intensely curated" and "an elegiac love song to aesthetic originary creation." Most of the hints are musical and others refer to science, literature or Jarmusch's work. The implicit vampires (Adam, Eve, and Christopher) are sort of "secret agents of artistic and intellectual achievement throughout history," having created art for others like William Shakespeare or Franz Schubert (for whom Adam is said to have written the famous Adagio of the cello string quintet D956, the movement used by Jarmusch in his 2009 film The Limits of Control). Early in the film, Adam asserts that seventeenth century musician William Lawes was known for his funeral music, perhaps confusing him with Henry Purcell. Lawes wrote no funeral music, but Purcell famously did.

=== The title ===
The title pays tribute to the Dave Wallis science fiction novel of the same name from 1964, although the plots have no similarities. A film adaptation was planned in the mid-1960s for director Nicholas Ray (a picture of him can later be seen in the film) starring the Rolling Stones.

=== Names ===
The names "Adam" and "Eve" can easily be inferred to allude to the biblical creation story but Jarmusch revealed he was originally referring to Mark Twain's satirical work The Diaries of Adam and Eve.

For her flight from Tangier to Detroit Eve uses the surname 'Fibonacci,' taken from the Italian mathematician Leonardo Fibonacci. On their flights to Tangier they use the names Stephen Dedalus (from James Joyce's A Portrait of the Artist as a Young Man and Ulysses) and Daisy Buchanan (from F. Scott Fitzgerald's The Great Gatsby). On his two visits to Dr. Watson (Jeffrey Wright) Adam's name tag shows "Dr. Faust" (from the German legend of Faust, from which Marlowe wrote the play The Tragical History of the Life and Death of Doctor Faustus). During his visits, Watson jokingly calls him "Dr. Strangelove" (the eponymous character in Stanley Kubrick's 1964 film Dr. Strangelove) and "Dr. Caligari" (an homage to the German silent film The Cabinet of Dr. Caligari).

=== Music equipment and technology ===
Parallel to Adam's fondness for vintage instruments and audio equipment, Jarmusch originally planned shooting the movie on analog film; budgetary considerations however forced the use of a digital Arri Alexa Plus with Cooke S4 lenses. Only vinyl (mostly singles) are played and analogue recording is used. The film opens with a view of a ten-course renaissance lute (credited as built by Michael Schreiner of Toronto). Adam receives four guitars in the beginning from Ian:

- a white 1959 Supro (then manufactured by Valco), which he names after William Lawes
- a silverblue 1966 Hagström
- an "early sixties" Silvertone in black
- a red Gretsch 6120 "Chet Atkins"; Adam once saw Eddie Cochran play one

Later, a 1905 Gibson L2 is shown while other guitars, violins and cellos can be seen in Adam's studio. Among Adam's recording equipment is a Premier drum set, a Telefunken and Revox tape recorder, a Marshall and Fender amps. Eve and her sister are more adapted to modern technology. To communicate via Skype with her lover, Eve uses her iPhone while Adam sets up a laptop connected to a wood-cabinet tube television. Ava uses YouTube to watch the music video of "Soul Dracula" by the French band Hot Blood.

=== Literature ===
Among the books Eve reads and packs for her trip to Detroit are:

- Los Pequeños Poemas by Ramón de Campoamor y Campoosorio
- Endgame by Samuel Beckett
- Infinite Jest by David Foster Wallace
- Don Quixote by Miguel de Cervantes
- The Temple of the Golden Pavilion by Yukio Mishima
- The Bastard of Istanbul by Elif Şafak
- The Adventures of Captain Hatteras by Jules Verne
- Basquiat edited by Sam Keller and Dieter Buchhart
- Orlando Furioso by Ludovico Ariosto
- Zwischen zwei Revolutionen by Ernst Heilborn
- The Metamorphosis by Franz Kafka
- "Man of Paper", from روايات عبير (Arabic versions of Harlequin novels) by Carole Mortimer
- A volume of the love poetry by the Arab poet Umar ibn Abi Rabi'ah and a picture of Lorenzo Ghiberti's "La Creazione di Adamo e di Eva" from his Porta del Paradiso.

Referring to the story that Christopher Marlowe may have faked his death and then written under the pseudonym of William Shakespeare, Marlowe tells Eve that Adam would have been the perfect inspiration for his Hamlet.

=== Scientists and inventors ===
The mentioned scientists (and one engineer) Adam adores are: Pythagoras, Galileo Galilei, Nicolaus Copernicus, Isaac Newton, Nikola Tesla, Charles Darwin, and Albert Einstein.

Eve flies to Detroit on the fictional airline "Air Lumière"; the name is allusion to Auguste and Louis Lumière.

=== Wall of fame ===
While Adam often mentions that he has no heroes, opposite his bed the wall is covered with pictures of personalities, which include:

- musicians: Henry Purcell, Johann Sebastian Bach, Franz Schubert, Gustav Mahler, Charley Patton, Robert Johnson, Billie Holiday, Hank Williams, Bo Diddley, Thelonious Monk, John Coltrane, Patti Smith, Chrissie Hynde, Frank Zappa and Jimi Hendrix.
  - among them the Jarmusch associates Tom Waits (Down by Law, Night on Earth, Mystery Train, Coffee and Cigarettes, and The Dead Don't Die), Iggy Pop (Dead Man, Coffee and Cigarettes, The Dead Don't Die), Joe Strummer (Mystery Train), RZA (Ghost Dog, Coffee and Cigarettes, and The Dead Don't Die) and Neil Young (Dead Man)
- writers: William Blake (mentioned in Dead Man), Christopher Marlowe, Lord Byron, Percy Bysshe Shelley, Mary Wollstonecraft, John Keats, Jane Austen, Edgar Allan Poe, Arthur Rimbaud, Emily Dickinson, Charles Baudelaire, Oscar Wilde, Franz Kafka, Mark Twain, Samuel Beckett and William S. Burroughs
- others: Isaac Newton, Nikola Tesla (the first which can be seen), Nicholas Ray, Luis Buñuel, Rodney Dangerfield, Buster Keaton, Rumi, Sitting Bull, Geronimo, Harpo Marx, Jean-Michel Basquiat and Marcel Duchamp

=== Places ===
The home of Adam is originally located at 82 Alfred Street, Detroit. When the protagonists are cruising around the neighbourhood, Adam shows Eve the Michigan Theater -- which is now a parking deck -- and the house where Jack White grew up with his family. White previously played a Tesla expert in Coffee and Cigarettes.

== Release ==
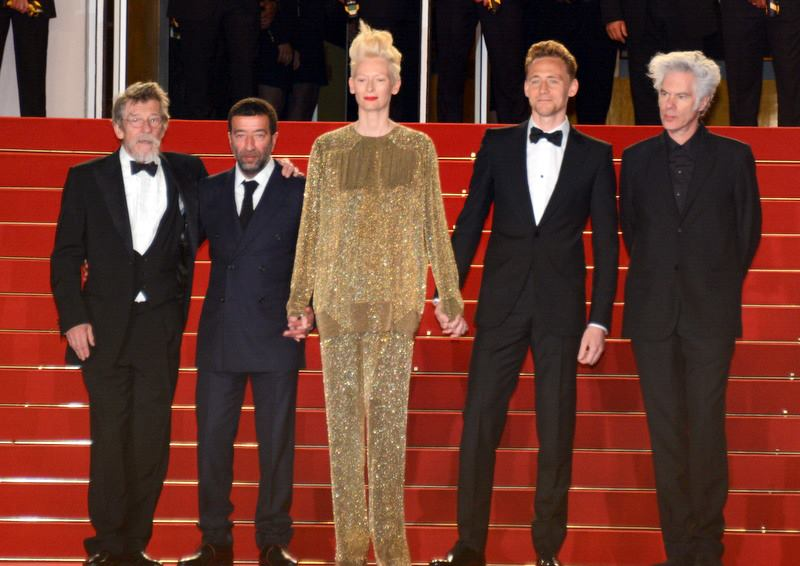
Cast and director at the 2013 Cannes Film Festival.

The film was shown in several film festivals during 2013, such as the Cannes Film Festival in the competition section in May, the September Toronto International Film Festival, four screenings at the September–October Reykjavík International Film Festival, and as an opening film for the 4th American Film Festival held in Wrocław, Poland.

The film was officially released in the United Kingdom on 21 February 2014, and opened in the United States on 11 April the same year.

== Reception ==
=== Critical response ===
On the review aggregator website Rotten Tomatoes, 86% of 210 critics' reviews are positive, with an average rating of 7.6/10. The website's consensus reads: "Worth watching for Tom Hiddleston and Tilda Swinton's performances alone, Only Lovers Left Alive finds writer-director Jim Jarmusch adding a typically offbeat entry to the vampire genre." Metacritic, which uses a weighted average, assigned the film a score of 79 out of 100, based on 41 critics, indicating "generally favorable" reviews.

Scott A. Gray of Exclaim! gave the film 8 out of 10, calling it "a visually poetic love story with a wry, jaded sense of humor about finding reasons to wake up every night." Calum Marsh of Slant Magazine gave it 3 out of 4 stars. Jonathan Romney of Screen International commented that it is Jarmusch's most poetic film since Dead Man.

Todd McCarthy of The Hollywood Reporter described the film as "the perennial downtown filmmaker's best work in many years, probably since 1995's Dead Man, with which it shares a sense of quiet, heady, perilous passage." Jonathan Hatfull of SciFiNow wrote that it is Jarmusch's best film since Ghost Dog.

Robbie Collin from The Daily Telegraph awarded the film 4 out of 5 stars and praised the performances of Swinton and Hiddleston: "In the time-honored Jarmuschian fashion, the few things that happen in Only Lovers Left Alive happen very slowly, but the dialogue is always gloomily amusing, and Swinton and Hiddleston's delivery of the gags is as cold and crisp as footstep in fresh snow." Jessica Kiang of IndieWire gave the film a B+ grade, saying, "The real pleasure of the film is in its languid droll cool and its romantic portrayal of the central couple, who are now our number one role models in the inevitable event of us turning vampiric."

Tim Grierson of Paste noted that "Hiddleston and Swinton play their characters not as blasé hipsters but, rather, deeply reflective, almost regretful old souls who seem to have decided that love is about the only thing you can count on." Peter Bradshaw of The Guardian gave the film 3 out of 5 stars, pointing that Adam and Eve look more like "well-born incestuous siblings" in spite of being lovers, while the Observer's Jonathan Romney concluded that the film is "a droll, classy piece of cinematic dandyism that makes the Twilight cycle redundant in one exquisitely languid stroke."

Kurt Halfyard of Twitch Film commented: "Retro recording equipment hasn't looked this claustrophobically sexy since Berberian Sound Studio." Alfred Joyner of International Business Times felt that "the melancholy that permeates Motown in the film could be seen as Jarmusch's take on the loss of America's greatness in the 21st century."

=== Accolades ===
Award	Category	Recipient(s)	Result	Ref.
Cannes Film Festival	Palme d'Or	Only Lovers Left Alive	Nominated	
Cannes Film Festival	Soundtrack Award	Jozef van Wissem	Won	
Independent Spirit Awards	Best Female Lead	Tilda Swinton	Nominated	
Independent Spirit Awards	Best Screenplay	Jim Jarmusch	Nominated	
Saturn Awards	Best Horror Film	Only Lovers Left Alive	Nominated	
Sitges Film Festival	Special Jury Prize	Only Lovers Left Alive	Won	
Vancouver Film Critics Circle	Best Actress	Tilda Swinton	Won	
