= Stop Mute Defeat =

Studio album by White Hills
- Released: May 19, 2017
- Length: 42:47
- Label: Thrill Jockey

White Hills chronology
Walks For Motorists (2015)	Stop Mute Defeat (2017)

Professional ratings
Aggregate scores
Source	Rating
Metacritic	80/100
Review scores
Source	Rating
AllMusic	3.5/5 stars
Backseat Mafia	8/10
Blurt	3/5 stars
PopMatters	9/10

Stop Mute Defeat is the tenth studio album by American band White Hills. It was released on May 19, 2017 through Thrill Jockey.

== Accolades ==
Publication	Accolade	Rank	Ref.
PopMatters	Top 60 Albums of 2017	60	

== Track listing ==
No.	Title	Length
1.	"Overlord"	7:21
2.	"A Trick of the Mind"	5:47
3.	"Importance 101"	4:26
4.	"Attack Mode"	4:21
5.	"If...1...2"	6:52
6.	"Sugar Hill"	4:49
7.	"Entertainer"	4:43
8.	"Stop Mute Defeat"	4:28
