= Divine Intervention (2002 film) =

2002 film by Elia Suleiman

- Directed by: Elia Suleiman
- Written by: Elia Suleiman
- Produced by: Humbert Balsan; Elia Suleiman
- Starring: Elia Suleiman; Manal Khader
- Distributed by: Avatar Films (USA)
- Release date: May 19, 2002
- Running time: 92 minutes
- Countries: France; Morocco; Germany; Palestine
- Languages: Arabic; Hebrew; English

Divine Intervention (Arabic: يد إلهية, romanized: yad ʾilāhiyya, lit. 'divine hand') is a 2002 surreal black comedy film co-produced, written and directed by Elia Suleiman. The film consists largely of a series of brief interconnected sketches, but for the most part records a day in the life of a Palestinian living in Nazareth, whose girlfriend lives several checkpoints away in the West Bank city of Ramallah.

One lyrical section features a sunglasses-clad Palestinian woman (played by Manal Khader) whose passing by not only distracts all eyes, but whose gaze causes Israeli military checkpoint towers to crumble. The director features prominently as the film's silent, expressionless protagonist in a performance that has been compared to the work of Buster Keaton, Jim Jarmusch and Jacques Tati.

The film is noted for its minimal use of dialogue, its slow pace and repetition in behavior by its characters.

== Plot ==
Divine Intervention while being a series of interconnected sketches, is a glimpse at life of Palestinians living under military occupation going in between the cities of Nazareth and Ramallah. E.S. lives in Nazareth while his father lives in Ramallah. The film begins by focusing on life in Ramallah with the Father for the first part of the film, bouncing between different stories of the neighbors within this area and the conflicts they undergo. Disputes between neighbors, Israeli police coming and going, the seizing of Palestinian owned things and places by the Israeli settlers, Palestinians interacting with/watching one another, etc.

In the second part of the film, E.S.'s Father has fallen ill and is in the hospital, he must now enter Ramallah and visit his father. While going in between Nazareth and Ramallah, E.S. begins meeting with The Woman in their cars at the border checkpoint between the two cities. The couple's clandestine meetings continue to take place throughout the rest of the film. Through them, viewers observe the Israeli military guards at the checkpoint as they interact with the Palestinians who are crossing into Nazareth.

The film is characterized by a lack of dialogue. The characters of the film are only able to observe the happenings of their everyday life without being able to interfere much as they are under military occupation and must adhere to it.

Sketches:

In Nazareth, Santa Claus runs away from children as gifts fall from his basket. He's been stabbed and leans against the ruin of a Franciscan chapel atop Mount Fear.

E.S.'s Father curses familiar faces as he drives through the streets.

Neighbors bicker over small stuff.

A Palestinian couple meets in a car at the border checkpoint between Ramallah and Nazareth.

More bickering neighbors.

A tourist asks an Israeli policeman for directions. Unable to help her himself, the policeman brings out a blindfolded Palestinian prisoner from the back of his van. The Palestinian tells her three different possible routes.

The couple is in the car again. The man (E.S.) blows up a red balloon with the face of Yasser Arafat drawn on it. He releases it near an Israeli checkpoint. An Israeli soldier is about to shoot it down but his comrade stops him. In the confusion, the couple are able to drive through the checkpoint together. The balloon floats across Jerusalem, eventually settling against the Dome of the Rock.

At night, the couple again in a car.

The next morning, five Israeli men practice an elaborate sequence of dance-like moves. Armed with guns, they repeatedly fire at targets painted like a Palestinian woman under the direction of a choreographer-officer. When one of the targets fails to fall to the ground, a real Palestinian woman (dressed like the targets) appears. The officer instructs his men to fire at her. In a supernatural feat, she gathers their bullets in the air around her and rises from the ground. The bullets form a crown of thorns around her head until she lets them fall to the ground. She then uses crescent-adorned stars and rocks to kill all but the officer. A helicopter appears to reinforce the Israelis, which the woman also easily destroys throwing a sheld with the form of Palestine. The dance choreographer watches helplessly and the woman disappears.

The film ends with E.S. and his mother watching their dinner cook in a pressure cooker.

== Cast ==
- Elia Suleiman as E.S.
- Manal Khader as The Woman
- Nayef Fahoum Daher as E.S.'s Father
- Denis Sandler Sapoznikov as Israeli soldier on Palestinian-Israeli border
- Menashe Noy as Soldier at Checkpoint.

== Oscar controversy ==
In December 2002, the Academy of Motion Picture Arts and Sciences denied the film's entry for the Academy Award for Best International Feature Film. Academy executive director Bruce Davis stated that the Academy did not accept the nomination because it did not recognise Palestine as a country. The decision drew condemnation from Palestinian human rights groups, with Permanent Observer Mission of Palestine to the UN Feda Abdelhadi Nasser saying that the Palestinian people "are now being denied the ability to compete in a competition that judges artistic and cultural expression."

The film was considered for an Oscar the following year following a rules change; Academy spokesperson John Pavlik told Variety: "The committee decided to treat Palestine as an exception in the same way we treat Hong Kong as an exception. It's always the goal of the foreign-language film award executive committee to be as inclusive as possible."

== Music ==
Divine intervention

Soundtrack album by Various Artists
- Released: September 30, 2002
- Genre: Soundtrack
- Length: 52:27
- Label: Milan Music

Elia Suleiman has used entirely non-original music of various genres and artists in the film. These include artists such as the Belgian singer Natacha Atlas, Indian composer A.R. Rahman, Lebanese electro-pop band Soapkills and Paris-based record producer Mirwais Ahmadzaï.

Track listing:

1. "I Put a Spell on You" by Natacha Atlas — 3:44
2. "Ana Oual Azab" by Mohammed Abdel Wahab — 9:01
3. "Fingers" by Joi — 6:34
4. "Easy Muffin" by Amon Tobin — 5:03
5. "Wala Ala Baloh" by Amr Diab — 5:08
6. "Les Kid Nappeurs Main Theme" by Marc Collin — 4:13
7. "Tango El Amal" by Nour el Houda — 3:10
8. "Mumbai Theme Tune" by A.R. Rahman — 5:14
9. "Definitive beat" by Mirwais — 3:58
10. "Tango" by Soapkills — 3:19
11. "Dub4me" by Soapkills — 3:03

== Awards ==
The film screened at the 2002 Cannes Film Festival on May 12, was awarded the Jury Prize and the FIPRESCI Prize for "its sensitive, amusing and innovative vision of a complex and topical situation and the tragic consequences that result from it".

Won

- Jury Prize at the Cannes Film Festival
- FIPRESCI Prize (competition) at the Cannes Film Festival
- Special Jury Prize at the Chicago International Film Festival
- Screen International Award at the European Film Awards

Nominated

- Palme d'Or at the Cannes Film Festival
- Best Non-American Film at the Bodil Awards

== See also ==
- List of Palestinian submissions for the Academy Award for Best Foreign Language Film
- List of Palestinian films
