= Elia Suleiman =

Palestinian film director (born 1960)

- إيليا سليمان
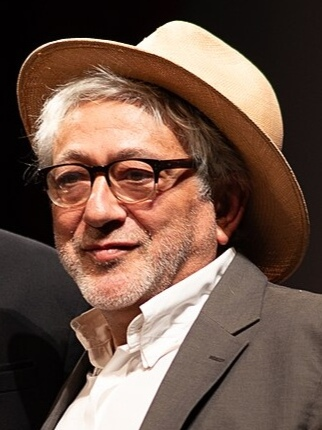
- Suleiman in 2024
- Born: 28 July 1960 (age 66); Nazareth, Israel
- Occupations: Film director, actor
- Years active: 1990–present
- Spouse: Yasmine Hamdan

Elia Suleiman (Arabic: إيليا سليمان, IPA: [ˈʔiːlja sʊleːˈmaːn]; born 28 July 1960) is a Palestinian film director and actor. He is best known for the 2002 film Divine Intervention (Arabic: يد إلهية), a modern tragicomedy on living under occupation in Palestine which won the Jury Prize at the 2002 Cannes Film Festival. Suleiman's cinematic style is often compared to that of Jacques Tati and Buster Keaton, for its poetic interplay between "burlesque and sobriety".

== Life and career ==
=== Early work ===
Between 1982 and 1993, Suleiman lived in New York City, where he co-directed Introduction to the End of an Argument (1990) and directed Homage by Assassination, both winning numerous awards.

An experimental video film, co-directed by Jayce Salloum, Introduction to the End of an Argument critiqued the portrayal of Arabs in Western media and its effect on foreign policy by juxtaposing clips from Hollywood films, television broadcasts and cartoons with live scenes (shot by Salloum) from the West Bank, and the Gaza Strip.

Homage by Assassination is a "diary film" that critiques the 1991 Gulf War via the juxtaposition of multilayered personal anecdotes and identity. The film offers a lucid portrait of what Ella Shohat and Robert Stam have termed "cultural disembodiment," manifested in "multiple failures of communication," that reflect the contradictions of a "diasporic subject."

=== Pedagogical work ===
In 1994, Suleiman moved to Jerusalem and began teaching at Birzeit University in the West Bank. He was entrusted with the task of developing a Film and Media Department at the university with funding support from the European Commission. In 2008 Elia Suleiman became a professor at the European Graduate School in Saas-Fee. He continues to guest lecture in other universities around the world.

=== Feature films ===
In 1996, Suleiman directed Chronicle of a Disappearance, his first feature film. It won the Best First Film Prize at the 1996 Venice Film Festival.

In 2002, Suleiman's second feature film, Divine Intervention, subtitled, A Chronicle of Love and Pain, won the Jury Prize at the 2002 Cannes Film Festival and the International Critics Prize (FIPRESCI), also receiving the Best Foreign Film Prize at the European Awards in Rome.

The third film in his trilogy is called The Time That Remains, which competed in the 2009 Cannes Film Festival. Suleiman won the Black Pearl prize for best Middle Eastern narrative film at the Middle Eastern Film Festival in Abu Dhabi on 17 October 2009. The film won the Critics' Prize from the Argentinean Film Critics Association at Mar del Plata International Film Festival.

His film, It Must Be Heaven, competed in the 2019 Cannes Film Festival and had its North American premiere at the 2019 Toronto International Film Festival.

Suleiman has stated that the October 7th attacks and the resulting war have made it difficult for him to be inspired to consider making another film. In a 2025 interview, he was quoted as saying, "I have been in a status quo myself since October 7th started. I couldn't write a word because I find myself feeling like when you had the Second World War, where you had a 'before' and 'after,' and I cannot grasp the ambience of this 'after,' which is a necessity for me because, most of the time, what happens in my process is I stay alert to sponge the ambience and to see where the world is heading. It's difficult for me now, in the middle of something going on. How do I sit down and write something that's, let's say, induced with poetics or induced with humour? It's very difficult, so I've been on hold, thinking, 'When is this nightmare going to end, so I can start to feel what the world looks like and what it might look like after?'"

=== Other film work ===
In his 1998 film, The Arab Dream ("Al Hilm Al-Arabi") Suleiman autobiographically explores issues of identity, expressing that: "I don't have a homeland to say I live in exile... I live in postmortem... daily life, daily death." Suleiman also produced a short film in 1997, entitled War and Peace in Vesoul.

In 2000, Suleiman released the 15-minute short film "Cyber Palestine" which follows a modern-day Mary and Joseph as they attempt to cross from Gaza into Bethlehem. Suleiman was part of the nine person jury for the 2006 Cannes Film Festival.

== Style ==
Suleiman is often cited for his use of silence in his films, in both their acting and directing. Suleiman criticized many Palestinian actors for too heavily relying on overly theatrical expression, stating, "A lot of the characters are movements within the frame, and I prefer the choreography, I prefer the musicality that comes from their appearances etc." Due to this sentiment, the oeuvre of Suleiman consists of many understated, dialogue-free performances, from both himself and his actors. Some scholars link Suleiman's stylistic silence to an expression of the oppression of Palestinians in occupied territory, with Tom Hill writing "the most subtle explorations of the particular, metonymic predicaments of Palestinian citizens of Israel."

Suleiman's films employ absurd, often dark humor throughout his work. This can be seen through instances such as Santa Claus being stabbed by a gang of children (Divine Intervention) and a salesclerk selling "holy water," which is later revealed to be coming from the tap (Chronicles of a Disappearance). Suleiman admits to using humor as a defense mechanism, stating in an interview that "When you make an audience laugh, you actually open their eyes to the issue on the screen. Laughter is against despair."

Suleiman's acting style is often likened to that of Buster Keaton, due to his expressive eyes and silent performances. However, Suleiman himself denies Keaton being an influence on his body of work, stating (when asked about his influences), "People always refer to Buster Keaton and Jacques Tati but it is not true, as I had made films before I watched them."

== Personal life ==
Suleiman is married to Lebanese singer and actress Yasmine Hamdan.

== Filmography ==
=== Feature films ===
- Chronicle of a Disappearance (1996)
- Divine Intervention (2002)
- The Time That Remains (2009)
- It Must Be Heaven (2019)

=== Short films ===
- "Homage by Assassination" (1993), The Gulf War... What Next?
- "The Arab Dream" (1998)
- "Cyber Palestine" (2000)
- "Awkward" (2007), To Each His Own Cinema
- "Diary of a Beginner" (2012), 7 Days in Havana

=== Documentary films ===
- Introduction to the End of an Argument (1990) (Co-directed by Jayce Salloum)

== Award ==
- 2024: Honorary Heart of Sarajevo Award during the Sarajevo Film Festival.

== See also ==
- Palestinian Christians
- Cinema of Palestine
