= Lynn Adib =

Syrian singer-songwriter, born 1986

Lynn Adib لين أديب
- Born: 1986 (age 39–40); Damascus, Syria
- Genres: Arabic music, electronic popular music, jazz
- Occupations: Singer, songwriter, composer
- Instruments: Vocals, flute, percussion
- Years active: 2018-present
- Member of: Bedouin Burger, Lynn Adib Quartet
- Website: lynnadib.com

Lynn Adib (Arabic: لين أديب, born 1986) is a Syrian musician and songwriter. She is known for her vocal styles and compositions, blending Arabic music, popular electronic music and jazz.

== Life and career ==
Adib began singing at the age of six in the choir of the Syriac Catholic Cathedral of Saint Paul in Damascus. There, she learned to know the tradition of Christian Byzantine music as well as choral practices associated with Muslim musical traditions. Between the ages of ten and twelve, she lived with her parents in Calgary, Canada, before returning to Syria with her mother. She attended a French-language school and later studied at the Higher Institute of Music in Damascus. At home, she was exposed to both Arabic and Western classical music.

In 2009, Adib moved to Paris to study pharmacy. She first attended the American School of Modern Music before studying jazz vocals at the Conservatoire à Rayonnement Régional de Paris. She subsequently married and gave birth to a daughter. Her husband died in 2017, after which she went to live for a period in Lebanon.

Adib released her debut album, Youmma, in 2018. The album is composed of her interpretations of traditional Syrian music, Bulgarian music, and modern jazz. In 2022, she released Nearness, a collaborative album with bassist Marc Buronfosse. On Alexandra Ivanova's 2023 album Beauty In Chaos, Adib was featured on the title song.

On Ma Li Beit, an album produced in collaboration with the Lebanese musician Zeid Hamdan as the duo Bedouin Burger, Adib performs in a variety of vocal styles, ranging from muwashshah to Bedouin ballads and lullabies, and sings in several Arabic dialects, including the Damascene Arabic of her native city. In 2021, they were featured at a Tiny Desk concert. The project's musical style has been described as "electro-tarab", a fusion of the Arabic maqam modes, Middle Eastern rhythms, electronic soundscapes, Arabic poetry, and synthesizer-driven beats.

== Discography ==
- Youmma (Bandcamp 2018, with Fady Farah, Maurizio Congiu, Lukmil Pérez and Feras Sharestan)
- Ya Bou Rdayen – Deezer Home Sessions (Single, Balkoon 2020)
- Lynn Adib & Marc Buronfosse: Nearness (Arts Culture Europe 2022)
- Bedouin Burger (Lynn Adib & Zeid Hamdan): Ma Li Beit (2024)
