= Yasmine Hamdan =

Yasmine Hamdan ياسمين حمدان
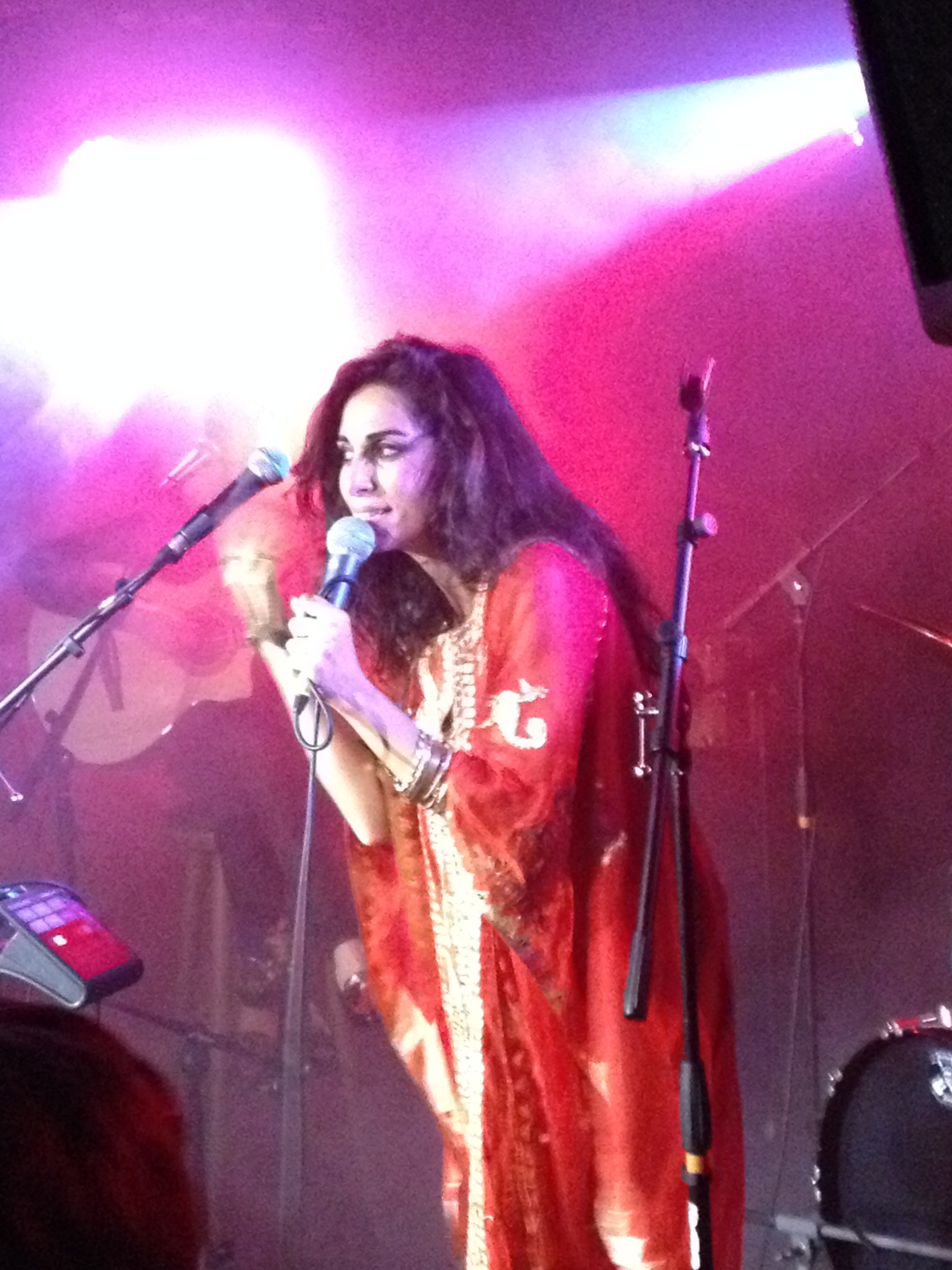
- Hamdan performing in 2013

Background information
- Born: Yasmine Hani Hamdan; 1976 (age 49–50); Beirut, Lebanon
- Genres: Electronica; trip hop
- Occupations: Singer; songwriter
- Years active: 1997–present
- Label: Crammed Discs
- Member of: Soapkills; Y.A.S.
- Spouse: Elia Suleiman

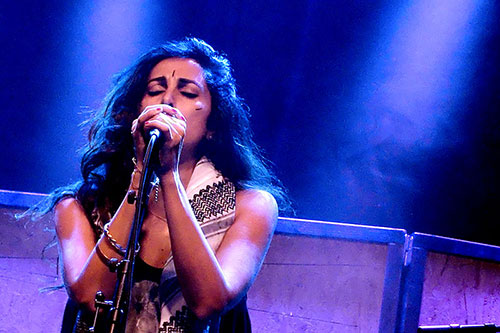
Aarhus Festival, 2015

Yasmine Hani Hamdan (Arabic: ياسمين حمدان; born 1976) is a Lebanese singer and songwriter, now based in Paris.

== Biography ==
Hamdan became known with Soapkills, the duo she founded with Zeid Hamdan (no relation) while she was still living in Beirut, Lebanon. The first album released by Soapkills was Bater (1999). Soapkills was one of the first independent electronic bands in the Middle East, and its innovative approach exerted a lasting influence. To this day, Yasmine Hamdan is considered an icon of underground music across the Arab world.

After moving to Paris, Hamdan collaborated with CocoRosie. She teamed up with Mirwais Ahmadzaï (who was part of French electronic new wave band Taxi Girl in the '80s, and produced/co-wrote some of Madonna's albums), with whom she recorded the 2008 album Arabology under the Y.A.S. moniker.

Hamdan then joined forces with Marc Collin (of Nouvelle Vague) to write and produce her first, self-titled solo album, which came out in France and Lebanon in 2012 on Kwaidan Records), and was released internationally (in a revised version with five new tracks) in 2013 by Crammed Discs under the title Ya Nass. In this album, which blends pop, folk and electronic sounds with melodies and lyrics inspired by various Middle-Eastern traditions, Hamdan "has undertaken the challenge of affirming and rewriting Arabic musical heritage", according to Al Akhbar. Her personal life (she has lived in Lebanon, Kuwait, Abu Dhabi, Greece and France) and her curiosity have enabled Hamdan to playfully use various dialects of Arabic in her lyrics, which alternate between Lebanese, Kuwaiti, Palestinian, Egyptian and Bedouin, as well as some of the code-switching which is so typical of Middle-Eastern humour.

Hamdan had a cameo in Jim Jarmusch's film Only Lovers Left Alive alongside Tilda Swinton and Tom Hiddleston. She has written an original soundtrack for the theatre play Rituel pour une métamorphose by Syrian playwright Saadallah Wannous for a production at Comédie-Française.

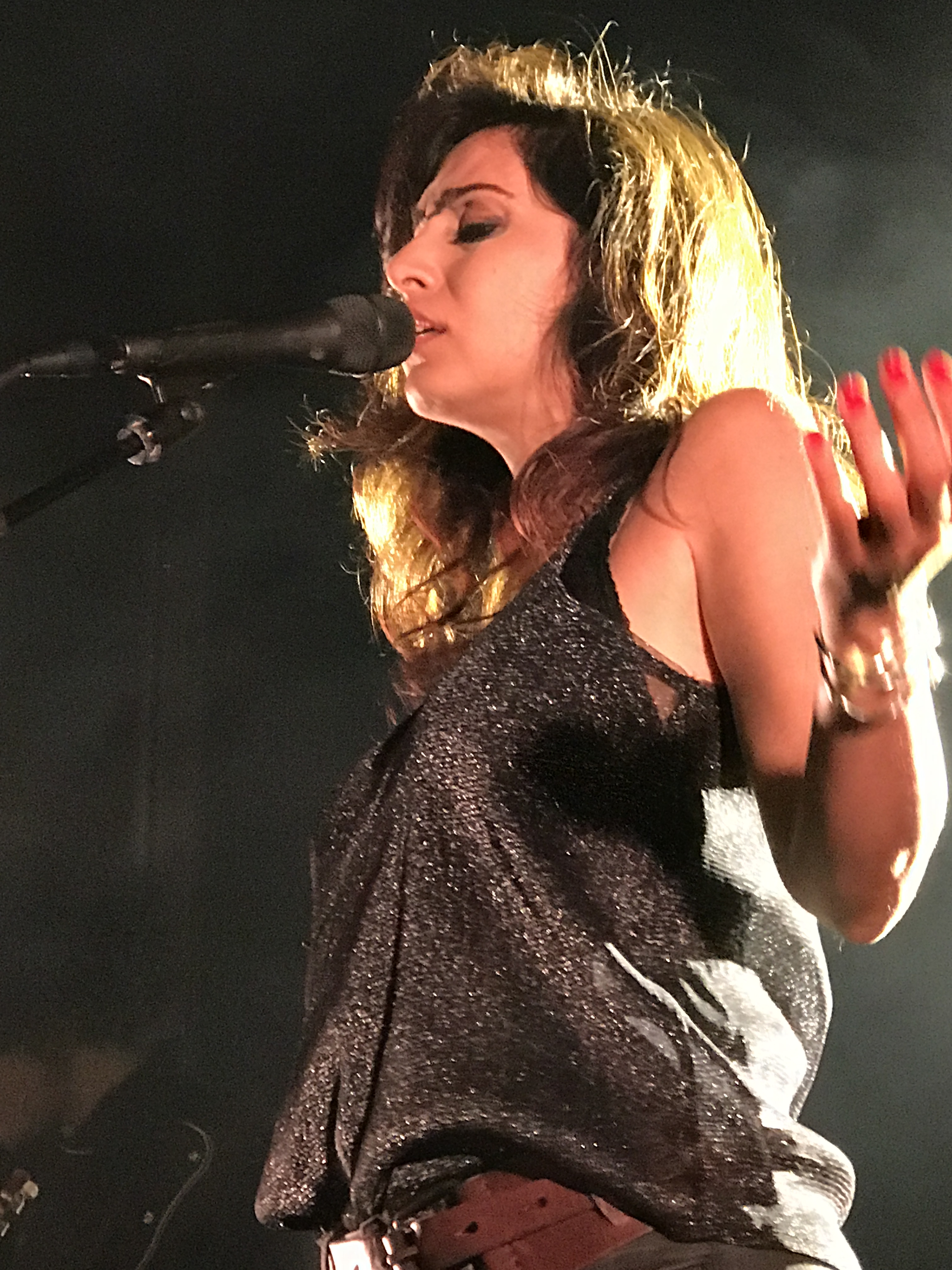
Concert in Berlin, 2017

Entitled Al Jamilat ('The Beautiful Ones'), Yasmine Hamdan's second solo album came out in 2017. Recorded in Beirut, Paris and London, it was produced by herself, co-produced by Leo Abrahams and Luke Smith, and features performances by Shahzad Ismaily, Steve Shelley and more. Jamilat Reprise, an album of reworks by the likes of Acid Arab, Matias Aguayo, Brandt Brauer Frick and several others, came out in 2018.

Yasmine Hamdan released her fourth album in 2025 entitled, I remember I forget.

Yasmine Hamdan is married to the Palestinian film director and actor Elia Suleiman and lives in Paris.

== Discography ==
with Soap Kills

- Bater (1999)
- Cheftak (2001)
- Enta Fen (2005)

with Y.A.S.

- Arabology (2009)

Solo studio albums

- Yasmine Hamdan / Ya Nass (2012)
- Al Jamilat (2017)
- I Remember I Forget (2025)

Remix albums and compilations

- Ya Nass Remixes Vol. 1 & 2 (2014)
- The Best of Soap Kills (2015)
- Jamilat Reprise (2018)

== Film music ==
- 2016: In Between by Maysaloun Hamoud
- 2013: Only Lovers Left Alive by Jim Jarmusch
- 2009: The Time That Remains by Elia Suleiman
- 2006: What a Wonderful World by Faouzi Bensaidi
- 2005: A Perfect Day by K.Jreij and Joana Hadjithomas
- 2003: Cendres by K.Jreij and Joana Hadjithomas
- 2002: Aux Frontière by D.Arbid, documentaire (ARTE, RTBF, CBF)
- 2002: Intervention Divine by Elia Suleiman
- 2002: Terra Incognita by Ghassan Salhab, Cannes 2002
