= Josef Ettlinger =

- Born: Josef Ettlinger; 22 October 1869; Karlsruhe
- Died: 2 February 1912 (aged 42); Frankfurt
- Occupations: Literary historian Journalist; Literary critic Translator

Josef Ettlinger (1869–1912) was a German literary historian, critic, journalist and translator.

== Life and work ==
Ettlinger came from a Jewish mercantile family. Initially he studied Music, but he found that he suffered from deafness and therefore switched to Philology. He received his doctorate in 1891 for a dissertation on the seventeenth century Silesian poet Christian Hoffmann von Hoffmannswaldau and then embarked on a successful career in publishing. Ettlinger was the founder, publisher and till his death managing editor of Das literarische Echo, a prominent bi-monthly literary magazine.

== Published output (selection) ==
=== Biographical and fictional ===
- Christian Hofman von Hofmanswaldau. Ein Beitrag zur Literaturgeschichte des siebzehnten Jahrhunderts (1891)
- Benjamin Constant. Der Roman eines Lebens.

=== Translation ===
- Gustave Flaubert: Madame Bovary (first German-language edition, 1892)
