= White Hills (band) =

American band

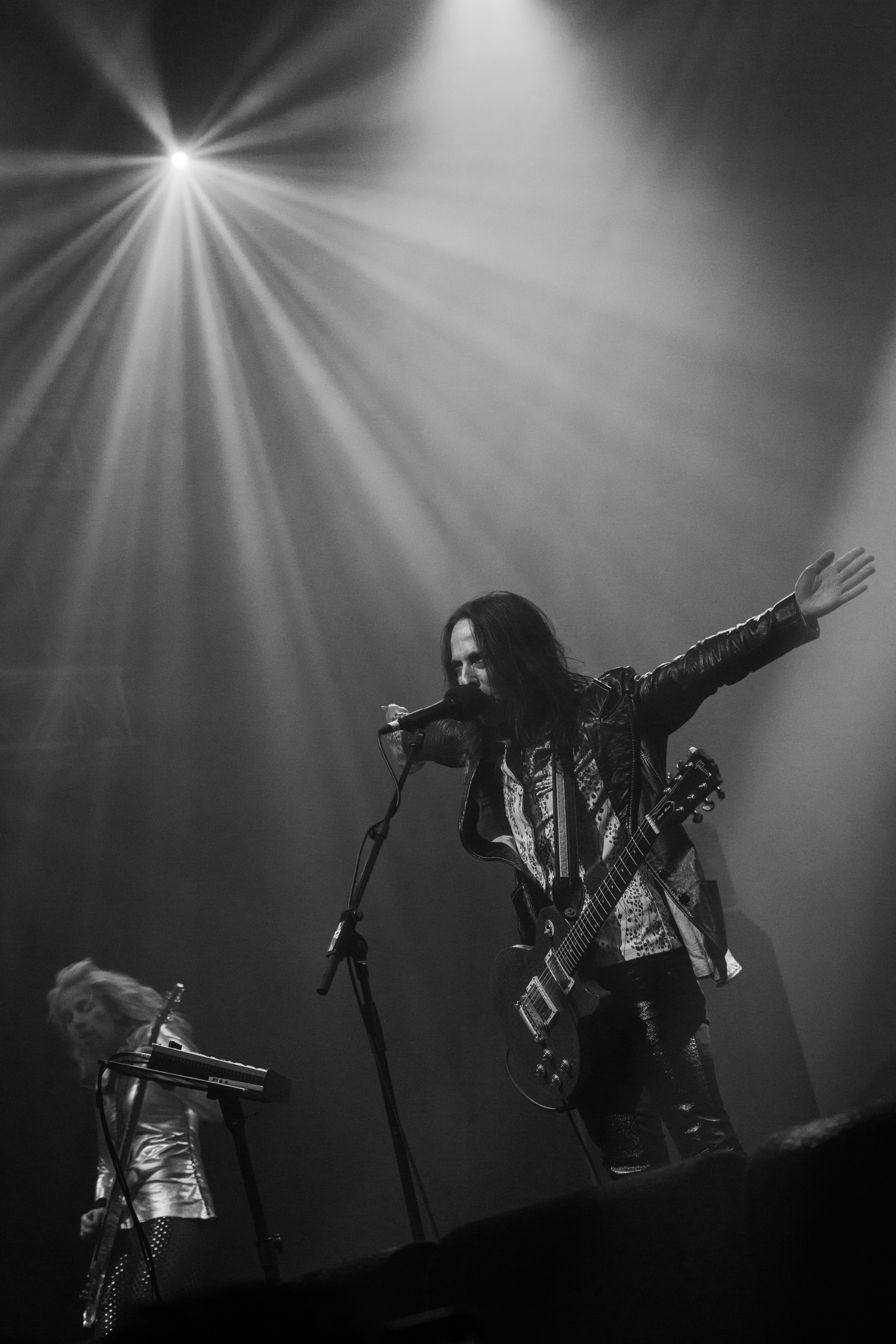

Background information
- Origin: New York City, New York, United States
- Genres: Psychedelic rock Stoner rock Space rock Experimental rock Post punk
- Instruments: guitar, bass, drums, synths
- Years active: Mid-2000s – present
- Labels: Thrill Jockey; White Hills; Drug Space; Rocket; Roadburn; Immune; God Unknown; Heads On Fire
- Members: Dave W. (guitar, vocals, synths); Ego Sensation (bass guitar, drums, vocals, synths)

White Hills is an American psychedelic rock band that was formed in 2003 in New York City. Founding members Dave W. (guitar and vocals) and Ego Sensation (bass, drums and vocals) have been the only constant members.

They have recorded over fifty releases including twelve full-length studio albums. Their music strikes "a riveting balance between heaviness and ethereality" combining elements of krautrock, post-punk, art rock, goth, psychedelic rock, metal, stoner rock, ambient and experimental music. They are often compared to Iggy Pop and the Stooges, Pink Floyd, Hawkwind, MC5 and Spiritualized.

== History ==
=== Early career ===
The band's first album, No Game To Play, was a solo recording project by Dave W created in 2003 but not widely released until 2005 when Julian Cope issued a limited remix of the album as They've Got Blood Like We've Got Blood on his Fuck Off and Di label. Dave put together a three piece band composed of Ego Sensation on bass and Bob Bellomo on drums. In 2006, Julian Cope invited the band to open his show at KOKO in London.The band's next album Glitter Glamour Atrocity (self-released) garnered the attention of music journalists including Stewart Lee from the Sunday London Times and Pitchfork creating sudden visibility for the group. Shortly after, UK label Rocket Recordings (Goat, Teeth of the Sea, GNOD) asked the band to record a third album. The band recorded Heads on Fire, the title track of which did not make it onto the album but appears on the tour-only CD-r Oddity II- Night Scene On Mill Mountain. Rocket went on to release a split 12" with White Hills and The Heads and a collaboration between White Hills and GNOD before the band signed with Thrill Jockey in 2009.

Upon signing to Thrill Jockey in 2009, the label released the 12" EP Dead followed a few months later by the band's self-titled album. Recorded at the Ocropolis in Brooklyn, Oneida's now extinct recording studio, the album features Kid Millions on drums and was reportedly recorded over three days. The band went on to record their career-defining H-p1 at the Ocropolis. Hailed as "quite possibly the finest album of space rock", H-p1 has been described as a "work of science fiction", the band citing Abstract Expressionist art as muse and a concern for "societal ills like consumerism and corporate control of government" as motivation. The title's meaning, according to Dave W, "is the name I have given to this disease of greed…that plagues our time…in the same way that scientists name viruses." Rough Trade included H-p1 in their Top Ten albums of the year.

The band's next two full-length albums Frying On This Rock (2012) and So You Are…So You'll Be (2013) were recorded with Nick Ferrante on drums by Martin Bisi at BC Studios in Brooklyn. Bisi, well known for his work with Sonic Youth, Swans, The Dresden Dolls, Herbie Hancock and John Zorn among others, helped the band achieve crisper tones than on their previous releases. So You Are…So You'll Be hit the UK Official Record Store Chart at #38.

Jim Jarmusch cast the band in his film Only Lovers Left Alive, which was shot in 2012 and released in 2013. In the summer of 2013, they supported The Cult on their 33 date US Electric 13 tour.

The band has several live releases in their discography including the full-length album Live At Roadburn from their performance in 2011 and a Scion released 10" split with Earthless from their 2012 performance at the Roxy in Los Angeles.

=== 2014–2021 ===
In Fall of 2014, the band convened in Bethesda, Wales at Bryn Derwyn studio to record an album with producer David Wrench, best known for his work with Glass Animals, Caribou and FKA twigs. The album Walks for Motorists was released in April 2015. Louder Than War called it "one the White Hills' best albums", drawing comparions to electronic acts like Kraftwerk, OMD and Depeche Mode.

In May 2017, their album Stop Mute Defeat was released. The band had joined forces again with Martin Bisi, a native New Yorker who made his name in the city's early hip-hop and no-wave scenes and was attracted to White Hills' new material for its distinct early-80s feel. Record Collector described it as "undoubtedly their best, most relevant work to date yet."

On October 23, 2020, their album Splintered Metal Sky was released on UK label God Unknown Records. The album includes contributions from fellow Only Lovers Left Alive alumni Jim Jarmusch and Yasmine Hamdan as well as Simone Marie Butler, bassist from Primal Scream, and Jim Coleman from Cop Shoot Cop. Their video "Honesty", directed by Northern Irish filmmaker Kiran Acharya and shot in both London and New York City, was debuted on NME.

After touring consistently for the previous 12 years, the band readjusted during the pandemic by writing and releasing a series of 8 "quarantine" EPs through Bandcamp in 2020.

=== 2022–present ===
In 2022, Dave and Ego formed their own label Heads on Fire Industries and released The Revenge of Heads On Fire, an expanded, double album building on the original. It received critical acclaim with Record Collector naming it their #1 Psych record of the year and The Quietus included it in their 2022 year end list calling it "the Apocalypse Now Redux of hard-rocking space-psych."

== Movie credits ==
Independent filmmaker Jim Jarmusch became a fan of White Hills and invited the band to perform at the All Tomorrow's Parties Music Festival in New York 2010 weekend he curated along with other artists Iggy Pop and The Stooges, Sleep, Sonic Youth, Sunn O))) and Boris. Jarmusch contacted the band in March 2012 asking them to play themselves performing their 2007 song "Under Skin Or By Name" in his new film, Only Lovers Left Alive. The script denotes a "visually striking band" playing wild music in a Detroit club. Jarmusch said he felt the part was made for White Hills. The band shares the screen with Tilda Swinton, Tom Hiddleston, Mia Wasikowska and Anton Yelchin. When the film was released in December 2013 in Germany, the band joined with other artists from the soundtrack including Jarmusch's band SQÜRL, Jozef van Wissem, Zola Jesus and Yasmine Hamdan to do a series of traveling live performances following the screenings of the film in Cologne, Berlin, London, Paris and New York.

In 2014, the band also appeared in Sound and Chaos: The Story of BC Studios directed by Sara Leavitt and Ryan C. Douglass. This documentary chronicles the birth and life of Martin Bisi's legendary recording and production studio co-founded by multi-instrumentalist and collaborator-extraordinaire Bill Laswell. Initially funded by Brian Eno (much of his album On Land was recorded there), the studio went on to host a who's-who of NYC musicians: White Zombie, J.G. Thirlwell, Afrika Bambaataa, Cop Shoot Cop, and many more. The film includes footage of White Hills in BC Studios during their Frying On This Rock sessions. The film made its New York premiere at Anthology Film Archives on July 17, 2014.

They provided additional music for the 2016 documentary Uncle Howard, directed by Aaron Brookner and starring Jim Jarmusch and John Giorno.

== Musical style ==
Their discography covers a wide expanse of sonic ground. Dave W, the principle lyricist for the band, has cited Jim Carroll and Buckminster Fuller as inspirations and has been quoted as saying, "I'm very conscious about making the records sound very different from each other."

The band is known for their captivating live performances with Pitchfork noting, "they're at their best onstage, where they're loud, exhilarating, and unhinged." White Hills' shows feature dramatic lighting and the usage of a fog machine. Previous auxiliary (recording / touring) members include: Antronhy (drums, various instruments), Nick Name (drums), Bob Bellomo (drums), Daved Pankenier, Kid Millions, Shazzula, and Pierre Auntour. They have shared stages with bands such as MONO, The Flaming Lips, Sleepy Sun, Cloudland Canyon, Mudhoney, Akron/Family, Monster Magnet, Oneida, Pontiak, and The Cult.

== Discography ==
=== Albums ===
- No Game to Play (White Hills, 2003, 2006, 2009 / 300mics, 2016)
- They've Got Blood Like We've Got Blood (Fuck Off And Di / Head Heritage, 2005)
- Koko (White Hills, 2006)
- Glitter Glamour Atrocity (White Hills, 2007 / Thrill Jockey, 2014 )
- Abstractions and Mutations (White Hills, 2007 / Thrill Jockey, 2009 / Immune, 2012)
- Heads on Fire (Rocket, 2007 / Thrill Jockey 2009, 2012, 2015)
- A Little Bliss Forever (Drug Space, 2008)
- Oddity... A Look at How the Collective Mind Works (Drug Space, 2010)
- White Hills (Thrill Jockey, 2010)
- GNOD Drop Out With White Hills II (Rocket Recordings, 2010, 2013, 2015)
- H-p1 (Thrill Jockey, 2011)
- Live at Roadburn 2011 (Roadburn, 2011)
- Oddity III: Basic Information (Drug Space, 2012)
- Frying on This Rock (Thrill Jockey, 2012)
- So You Are... So You'll Be (Thrill Jockey, 2013)
- Walks for Motorists (Thrill Jockey, 2015)
- Stop Mute Defeat (Thrill Jockey, 2017)
- Splintered Metal Sky (God Unknown, 2020)
- The Revenge of Heads on Fire (Heads on Fire, 2022)
- Beyond This Fiction (Heads on Fire, 2024)
- Drop Out III (with Gnod) (Thrill Jockey, 2025)

=== EPs ===
- No Kind Ending, Vol. 2 (White Hills, 2008)
- Dead (Thrill Jockey, 2009)
- Stolen Stars Left for No One (Thrill Jockey, 2010)
- Black Valleys (Aquarius, 2011)
- yes no Live at the Delancey with Borts Minorts (DogAndPanda, 2015) (collaboration)
- In Due Time (White Hills, 2020)
- A Point in Time (White Hills, 2020)
- One Day at a Time (White Hills, 2020)
- Electronic Time (White Hills, 2020)
- Time Out (White Hills, 2020)
- Time and Time Again (White Hills, 2020)
- This Time (White Hills, 2020)
- The Last Time (White Hills, 2020)

=== Singles ===
- "Measured Energy" (7") (Trensmat, 2011)
- "Pulse b/w VI-x (7") (Bronson Recordings, 2017)
- "Putting on the Pressure b/w Pull Back the Bolt" (7") (Valley King Records, 2017)

=== Compilation ===
- Oddity II: Night Scene on Mill Mountain (Drug Space, 2010)
