= Das literarische Echo =

- Format: Magazine
- Publisher: Deutsche Verlags-Anstalt, (1898–1923)
- Managing editor: Josef Ettlinger (1898–1912); Ernst Heilborn (1912–1933); Wilhelm Emanuel Süskind (1933–1944)
- Founded: 1898
- Ceased publication: 1944
- Headquarters: Munich

Das literarische Echo - The Bimonthly magazine for the friends of literature (Halbmonatschrift für Literaturfreunde) - was a German literary magazine. Between its establishment in 1898 and 1923 it was published by Deutsche Verlags-Anstalt. Its managing editor from its inception till his death in 1912 was the literary historian Josef Ettlinger who was succeeded by Ernst Heilborn. In 1933, the year of Germany's régime change, Heilborn was succeeded by Wilhelm Emanuel Süskind. Many of the most important writers and literary critics in the German speaking countries of central Europe wrote for Das literarische Echo during the years before the First World War.

The magazine underwent a name change in 1923, becoming known simply as Die Literatur. A further name change saw it published, between 1942 and 1944, under the title Europäische Literatur.

Contributors included:

- Otto Julius Bierbaum
- Richard Dehmel
- Paul Heyse
- Ricarda Huch
- Fritz Mauthner
- Friedrich Schrader
- Emile Verhaeren
- Georg Witkowski
- Ernst von Wolzogen
- Fedor von Zobeltitz
- Stefan Zweig
