= Gnod =

English rock band

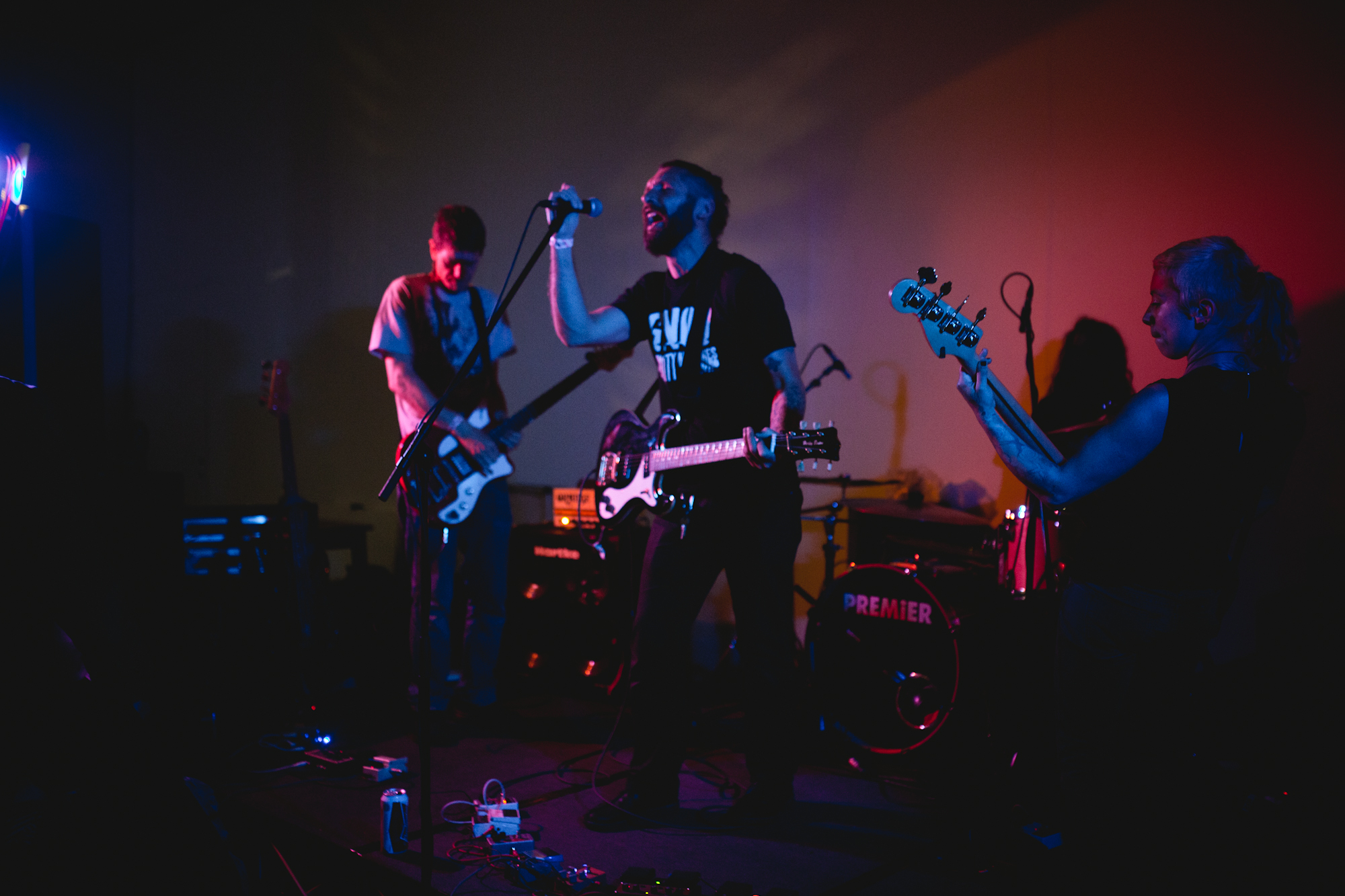
- GNOD (2015)

Background information
- Origin: Salford, England
- Genres: Psychedelic rock, space rock, drone
- Years active: 2006–present
- Labels: Rocket Recordings, Tesla Tapes
- Members: Paddy Shine; Chris Haslam; Marlene Ribeiro; Alex Macarte; Andy Blundell; Jesse Webb; John Perry; Neil Francis
- Website: gnod.bandcamp.com

Gnod are an English rock band from Salford. The band's current lineup since 2012 is made up of key members Paddy Shine, Chris Haslam, Marlene Ribeiro, Alex Macarte and Andy Blundell, with a rotating cast of players, including drummers Jesse Webb and John Perry and vocalist Neil Francis.

Formed in 2006, the band were described in a review of its 2011 release Ingnodwetrust as "a collective from Manchester with an ever-rotating list of members." In addition to releasing its work on Rocket Recordings, the band's own Tesla Tapes label serves, according to its Bandcamp page, as "an outlet for musical projects and meanderings by Gnodheads past, present & future and friends of Gnod all over the world."

As part of a residency at the Islington Mill Art Academy, the band curated "Tangent", an installation by sound artist Callum Higgins. According to the academy's website, the event "transformed our club space into a fully immersive, light reactive environment. Using the PA system and light sensitive noise creating circuits people were directed into the room in small groups equipped with only a torch to guide them around. Their very presence and behaviour in the room manipulated and shaped their unique experience. The band also participates in a recurring shared club night at Islington Mill called Gesamtkunstwerk, (German for "whole arts work".) Reviewing a Gnod performance there, New Musical Express said, "this band are crazy good ... see them live now."

According to founding Gnod member Paddy Shine, Tesla Tapes takes its name from Nikola Tesla; band members cite such other non-musical influences as Kurt Vonnegut, David Simon, Graham Hancock and Rupert Sheldrake. Asked what the band would like to tell the world, Chris Haslam responds "Rebel! Rebel! We are many, they are few!"

== Discography ==
- Gnod (2007)
- Chaudelande (2013)
- Mirror (2016)
- Infinity Machines (2015)
- Just Say No To The Psycho Right-Wing Capitalist Fascist Industrial Death Machine (2017)
- Be Aware of Your Limitations (2018)
- Chapel Perilous (2018)
- Easy to Build, Hard To Destroy (2021)
- La mort du sense (2021)
- Hexen Valley (2022)
- Spot Land (2024)
- Drop Out III (with White Hills) (2025)
- Chronicles of Gnowt (Vol 1) (2026)
- Chronicles of Gnowt (Vol 2) (2026)
