= Soap Kills =

Lebanese musical group

Soapkills (الصابون يقتل)
- Origin: Lebanon
- Genre: Trip hop
- Years active: 1998–present
- Label: Independent
- Members: Zeid Hamdan; Yasmine Hamdan

Soapkills (Arabic: الصابون يقتل read as As-Saboun Yaqtol) is a Lebanese indie electronic pop duo formed in October 1997. The group consisted of Zeid Hamdan and Yasmine Hamdan, both born in Beirut in 1976 and not related. Soapkills emerged from a shared interest in combining elements of classical Arabic with electronic music.

== Background ==
Although Soapkills did not yet achieve widespread commercial success, the group developed a cult following and was regarded as an influential act within Lebanon's underground independent and alternative music scenes. The duo drew inspiration from both classical Arab music and the emerging electronic and trip-hop scenes in the Middle East. French media described the group as “trip hop à l’orientale”.

The band’s name originated from a song written by Zeid Hamdan and, according to him, referred to the post–civil war reconstruction of Beirut. Hamdan explained that the name reflected the contrast between the city’s apparent renewal and the erasure of its violent past, describing the reconstruction as “shiny” yet unsettling.

The group’s early sound was heavily shaped by the use of a Roland MC-303 Groovebox, which Hamdan adopted after the dissolution of Lombrix, a rock band he had co-founded in the mid-1990s with Yasmine Hamdan and other musicians. The machine allowed Hamdan to develop electronic compositions without relying on a full band lineup.

Soapkills appeared on several compilations before releasing their debut album, Bater, in 2001. The album featured contributions from Rabih Mroué and Walid Sadek, who played flute and trumpet, respectively.

In 2005, the duo released Enta Fen, their final album. The record included new material as well as remixes of earlier songs. Following this release, both members began focusing on separate projects, and Soapkills became inactive without a formal announcement of disbandment. In 2007, Time magazine cited Soapkills as part of Beirut’s “small but artistically significant rock scene,” highlighting the group’s role within the city’s alternative music landscape.

== Solo projects ==
During and following their involvement in Soapkills, Yasmine Hamdan and Zeid Hamdan both pursued a range of independent musical projects. Zeid Hamdan went on to form the band The New Government, continuing his work as a composer and producer within Beirut's alternative music scene.

Yasmine Hamdan later collaborated with French producer Mirwais Ahmadzaï, with whom she formed the electronic duo Y.A.S. Their album Arabology was released in France in March 2009. The project placed Arabic lyrics at the center of electronic and dance music. Hamdan subsequently embarked on a solo career, releasing her debut solo album, Ya Nass, released internationally with Crammed Discs.

== In popular culture ==
Soapkills' music has been featured in a number of Lebanese films. Their tracks appear on the soundtrack of the 2005 film A Perfect Day, directed by Joana Hadjithomas and Khalil Joreige. One of the band's songs was also used as the main theme for Quoi, of their songs is the main theme of des chaussures ? (What Shoes), a 2006 short film by Gregory Buchakjian.

In 2002, Soapkills collaborated with artist Lamia Joreige and choreographer Makram Hamdan on the Bater Dance Projects, a multimedia installation and performance that integrated their music with visual and choreographic elements. ce Project a multimedia installation and performance.

The group’s music has since been retrospectively associated with the early development of Arab electronic and alternative pop music, particularly through the later solo careers of its members.

== Members ==
- Zeid Hamdan – production, composition, electronics
- Yasmine Hamdan – vocals, lyrics

== Discography ==
Studio albums

- Bater (2001)
- Cheftak (2002)
- Enta Fen (2005)

Compilation albums

- The Best of Soap Kills (2015)

Extended plays

- Lost (1998)
- Live at Circus (1999)
