= Ernst Heilborn =

German writer, critic and journalist

- Born: Ernst Friedrich Heilborn; 10 June 1867; Berlin
- Died: 16 May 1942 (aged 74); Berlin (by the Gestapo )
- Occupations: Journalist literary critic author

Ernst Friedrich Heilborn (1867–1942) was a German writer, critic and journalist.

== Life and work ==
Heilborn successfully completed his secondary education at the French School in Berlin, and went on to study philosophy, history and German literature with linguistics at university in Jena and Berlin. He received his doctorate in 1890 with a dissertation entitled tantalizingly "Der Wortschatz der sogenannten ersten schlesischen dichterschule in wortbildung und wortzusammensetzung dargestellt" (The Vocabulary of the so-called first First Silesian School of Poets presented in word pictures and word composition).

In the 1890s he began work in the world of German journalism. He was the editor of various newspapers and magazines, and between 1912 and 1933 he was managing editor of Das literarische Echo (renamed "Die Literatur" in 1923). Since 1901 he had been reporting on the Berlin theatre scene for the Frankfurter Zeitung.

As an author he produced cultural and historical works as well as biographies and several novels. However, from 1933 his journalistic activity was increasingly restricted due to his Jewish provenance, and in November 1936 a "writing ban" was imposed on him. He traveled to Palestine in 1937, but returned to Germany. In 1942 he was placed under a renewed travel ban, and together with his wife he was arrested while trying to escape. Heilborn died in prison.

== Published output (selection) ==
=== Cultural and historical ===
- Vom Geist der Erde – Ein Zeitbrevier. Egon Fleischel, Berlin 1921.
- Zwischen zwei Revolutionen. 2 Bände:
  - Vol 1: Der Geist der Schinkelzeit (1789–1848). Berlin 1927.
  - Vol 2: Der Geist der Bismarckzeit (1848–1918). Berlin 1929.
- Die Gute Stube – Berliner Geselligkeit im 19. Jahrhundert. Rikola, Wien/München/Leipzig 1922.

=== Fiction ===
- Kleefeld. Roman. Stuttgart 1900.
- Der Samariter. Roman. Berlin 1901.
- Josua Kersten. Roman. Berlin 1908.
- Die steile Stufe. Roman. Egon Fleischel, Berlin 1910.
- Die kupferne Stadt. Legenden. Berlin 1918.
- Tor und Törin. Novelle. Leipzig 1927.
