= Jayce Salloum =

Canadian multidisciplinary artist

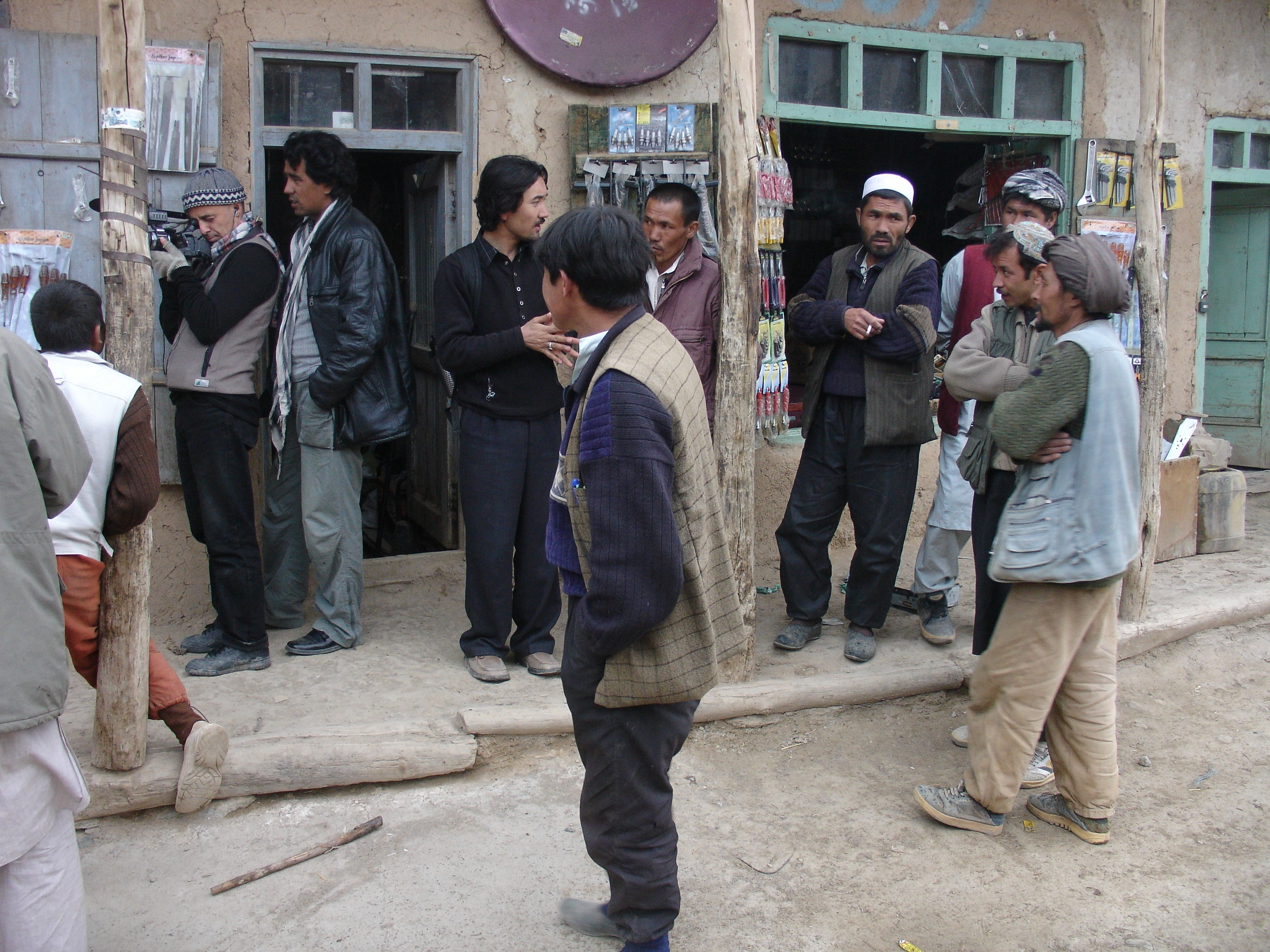
- Salloum, second from left, holding video camera, working in Panjaw, Bamiyan, Afghanistan (2008).
- Born: 1958; Kelowna, British Columbia
- Education: University of California, San Diego (MFA, 1988), Whitney Museum of American Art, Independent Study Program, (1988), San Francisco Art Institute (BFA, 1980), Banff Centre for Arts and Creativity (1978-1979), Banff School of Fine Arts (1975)
- Known for: photographer, filmmaker and video artist, installation artist, curator
- Awards: Governor General's Award in Visual and Media Arts (2014)

Jayce Salloum (born 1958) is a Canadian multidisciplinary artist.

== Early life ==
A grandson of Syrian immigrants from what is now Lebanon's Beqaa Valley, he was born and raised in Kelowna and since 1997 has been based in Vancouver. He earned a BFA degree from the San Francisco Art Institute in 1980, followed by a Master of Fine Arts degree from the University of California, San Diego in 1988. Salloum has lived and worked in Beirut, New York, San Francisco, Toronto and elsewhere.

== Career ==
A multidisciplinary artist, since 1978 Salloum has produced work in installation, photography, video, performance and text, as well as curating and coordinating a vast array of cultural projects.

His work is included in over one hundred permanent collections, including the Art Gallery of Ontario, Toronto, the Asia Art Archive, the Centre Pompidou, Paris, J. Paul Getty Museum, Los Angeles, Museum of Contemporary Art, Belgrade, the Museum of the Americas, Managua, Nicaragua, Museum of Modern Art, New York, National Gallery of Canada, Ottawa, National Museum of Contemporary Art, Athens, Saradar Collection, Beirut, Lebanon, Sharjah Art Foundation, UAE, Vancouver Art Gallery, British Columbia. In addition to these museums and galleries, Salloum's work has been collected by numerous universities, including the American University of Beirut, Lebanon, Birzeit University, Ramallah, Palestine, Carleton University, Ottawa, Centre for Contemporary Arab Studies, Georgetown, Columbia University, New York, Concordia University, Montréal, Duke University, N. Carolina, Northwestern University, Evanston, Illinois, Ontario College of Art & Design, Toronto, University of British Columbia, Vancouver, University of California, University of Pennsylvania, Philadelphia, Yale Film Archive, New Haven, Connecticut.

After first attending the Banff School of Fine Arts (now the Banff Centre for Arts and Creativity) in 1975, Salloum returned in 1978 to study photography, after spending one year at the San Francisco Art Institute studying drawing, photography, and painting. Under the guidance of Hubert Hohn (who worked with Ansel Adams and assisted Minor White), Salloum learning the technical, formal intricacies of making a photograph. The centre, at the time, was a site of collaboration and camaraderie where artists pushed one another to develop their capabilities. It was at this time that Salloum started working with colour photography. His body of work "location/dis-location(s)"—part of the "untitled" series—began in Banff, and continues through to today. The constitutive photographs of the ongoing "untitled" series are largely documentations of the margins and the periphery within numerous cities. These images are varied and present an archive of the city when installed and exhibited by Salloum. Salloum notes that his photographs offer "partial glimpses or fragments of understanding" and, further, there is no "fulfillment of knowledge." After attending the summer 1979 photography masterclass at Banff, Salloum returned to the San Francisco Art Institute.

In 2001, Salloum was invited to exhibit as part of a group exhibition at the Canadian Museum of Civilization (now the Canadian Museum of History). The exhibition was set to open in October of that year, but was cancelled in the aftermath of the September 11 attacks a month prior. Central to the museum's decision to cancel the exhibition was Salloum's video installation, untitled part 1: everything and nothing, in which Salloum interviews Soha Bechara. Bechara had shot and attempted to assassinate South Lebanon Army commander Antoine Lahad. She was thereafter detained by the South Lebanon Army for nearly ten years at its Khiam prison in Southern Lebanon, which was at the time within a security belt occupied by Israel. In the video, Bechara expresses the need to resist the Israeli occupation, which was seen as controversial by the directors of the Canadian Museum of Civilization. The postponement was criticized by some civil liberties organizations and arts communities as a form of inappropriate cultural censorship. At the same time, in support of the museum's decision to postpone or perhaps censor the video installation, some advocacy groups questioned whether a state-funded museum should support a work that promoted hatred and hostility, political propaganda, and one-sided promotion of hostility and divisiveness. After a discussion ensued in the House of Commons, in which Prime Minister Jean Chrétien voiced his support for the exhibition, the show opened as scheduled.

In 2005, Salloum was commissioned by Kelowna's Alternator Gallery to create a new video work for their compilation video project, "Temporal Transmissions," part of the city's 2005 centennial celebration. Salloum created a 38-minute video, untitled part 4: terra ~~in~~cognita, which interviews local Syilx First Nations residents and documents the history and legacy of Canada's ongoing colonialism. The day prior to the screening, the city of Kelowna tried to censor the works and cancelled the scheduled premiere screening. Salloum was able to convince Kelowna's Alternator Gallery to screen the film that same night, and in the ensuing weeks after much press coverage and public debate the city decommissioned the complete compilation project and denied the final funding due to the Alternator gallery. The video was claimed by local First Nations as their own film, and presented in schools as part of their history.

In 2014, he won the Governor General's Awards in Visual and Media Arts. In 2016 he was a nominee for the Scotiabank Photography Award.

== A living archive ==
Jayce Salloum, location/dis-location(s): beyond the pale (2017). Installation view. McCord Museum, Montreal.

From 1982 onward, Salloum accumulated vast amounts of research materials for what would become the installation Kan Ya Ma Kan/There was and there was not (1995). For Salloum, this material constituted a living archive that "called into question notions of history and research methodology, their role in the effacement of histories, and the mediated process inherent in the representation and (mis)understanding of another culture…" This notion of a living archive recurs throughout Salloum's body of work and can be seen in both his installation work as well as his curatorial engagements. Archival interventions are a mode of artistic production in Salloum's native Lebanon that became common place after the 1975-1990 Lebanese Civil War, and much of the work of Salloum's colleagues—in particular, Walid Raad, Akram Zaatari, Joana Hadjithomas and Khalil Joreige, and Lamia Joreige—is in some manner oriented towards the archive. The archives employed in Salloum's untitled series, for example, are not static but are instead dynamic.

Much of the ongoing untitled series centres around questions of resistance and representation. The traces that one leaves behind in place—the traces of the self that form what Salloum refers to as the histories of the self—are videotaped by Salloum in an effort to bring the personal space into "the context of the intrinsic social and political site." As Jim Drobnick and Jennifer Fisher note, "Salloum's practice of taking photographs works as a kind of visual diary of the act of 'passing by.' Countering touristic 'first-glance' snapshots, he is committed to knowing a place well before photographing it." Salloum enacts the role of a "curator-collector" in his "untitled" series, in which he is not only active in making the photograph, but in grouping in with others as well. Images take on another meaning when amassed together, as an archive of the city and its margins. When exhibited, Salloum's "untitled" photographs are "constellations" of the city, where meaning is multiple and uncertain, to be determined in part by the viewers themselves. Displayed as such, Salloum's photographs give the impression of seeing while walking through a city. Photographs are arranged in varied manners, including isolated individually, paired, or collected in clusters. This representational strategy presents not simply a static archive of the city, but an ever changing, dynamic, living archive that the viewer is invited to walk through, or past.

"Resisting any form of Singularity, for either himself as photographer or for us as viewers, these ["untitled"] photographs demand the adoption of a motile subjectivity. Their diversity, occupying all positions on the spectrum of aesthetic possibility—alternatively seductive/repulsive, intriguing/banal, formally sophisticated/ snapshot raw, empathetic/voyeuristic, surreal/documentary—replicates not the identifiable, trademark vision that is so often demanded of an artist, but the fractured, fluid experience of living and being in a contemporary metropolis."

— Jim Drobnick and Jennifer Fisher, "Jayce Salloum: Archive of the Street," in Robert Bean, ed. "Image and Inscription: An Anthology of Contemporary Canadian Photography" (Toronto: YYZBooks), 177.

Jayce Salloum, لِ که سوز ندارد, دلِ نیس, the heart that has no love/pain/generosity is not a heart (fragments) (2008–14). Installation view, National Gallery of Canada, 2014.

In 1992, two years after the end of the Lebanese Civil War, Jayce Salloum visited Lebanon with his then assistant, artist Walid Raad. Over the year, Salloum recorded over 200 hours of videotape, as well as several thousand photographs. He also accrued a half ton of documents and found film. This archive would form the basis of two films, This is Not Beirut (1994) and Up to the South (Talaeen a Junuub) (1993), as well as the series of photos titled (sites+) demarcations (1992–94). By drawing upon large volumes of media, from photography to video, Salloum's installations try to capture the significant number of images that attempt to capture (and represent) the MENA region. The 1995 installation Kan ya ma Kan (كان يا ما كان) (There was and there was not) was a culmination of a process of accumulation from 1982 onward, and included some of the 1992 material, and explored the production of middle east history and knowledge and the role of the artist in producing such a history. Museum viewers were encouraged to physically interact with the material. They could touch and reorganize what was presented in front of them, becoming a part of the exhibition and reconstruction of a history.

== Representing resistance ==
Much of Salloum's video and photographic archival practice concerns questions of visual representation. For example, the untitled video series confronts issues of representation by drawing one's eyes to the margins, asking us to engage with—and look at—what lay on the periphery. What is found at the edges of being asks us to reconsider any meaningful distinction between modes of fact and modes of fiction. His early film Introduction to the End of an Argument/Speaking for Oneself...Speaking for Others... (مقدمة لنهائيات جدال)(1990), co-directed with Palestinian filmmaker Elia Suleiman, marks Salloum's interest in refusing any distinction between modes of documentary and contemporary art. The documentary blurs into the fictive in his continued investigation of the terms of representation.

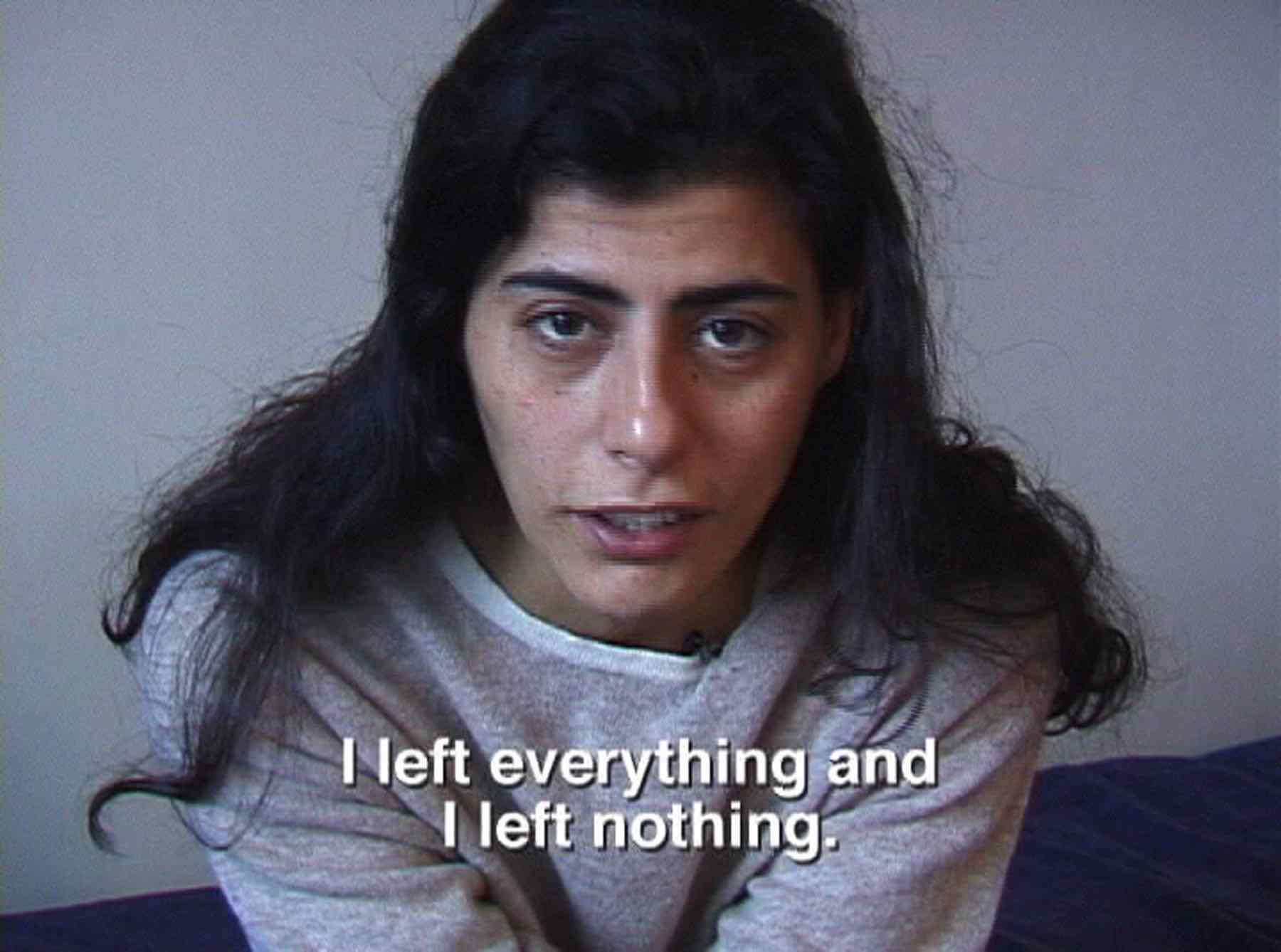
Soha Bechara, from Jayce Salloum's 2001 video untitled part 1 everything and nothing.

Intertwined with the issue of representation is, for Salloum, the issue of resistance. In his video untitled part 1: everything and nothing (2001), Salloum interviews Soha Bechara, a member of the Lebanese National Resistance/Lebanese Resistance Front who was detained in the Khiam detention camp in Southern Lebanon from 1988 to 1999. The camp was run by the South Lebanon Army and the Israeli Defense Forces, who occupied Southern Lebanon at the time. Over the decade, Amnesty International issued numerous reports on the squalid conditions of the camp, and Sallum notes that "various tortures inflicted upon the detainees included electric shock (to fingers, tongue, lobes, nose, toes, breasts, nipples, genitals), beatings, confinement in a cube (3’ square), soaking, hanging, and long term sleep deprivation." Salloum's video interview with Bechara provides a representation of resistance, in both Bechara's capability to provide testimony to the conditions in Khiam, as well as her ability to be a figure of resistance as a popular figure in Lebanon.

== Selected works ==
=== Video/film ===
- "..In the absence of heroes.." Part IV: Warfare/A case for context - Introduction, 60:00, VHS to 3/4" 1984
- "..In the absence of heroes.." Part IV: Warfare/A case for context, 43:00, VHS to 3/4" 1984
- "The Ascent of Man.." 24:00, Part I: Silent Running, 4:42; Part I: Appendix, 4:40; Part II: Conditions of Mercy, 6:15; Part III: Acts of Consumption, 8:00, VHS to 3/4", 1985-1987
- Once you’ve shot the gun you can't stop the bullet, 8:00, 8mm videotape and Super-8 film, 1988
- Muqaddimah Li-Nihayat Jidal (Introduction to the End of an Argument)/Speaking for oneself... Speaking for others, 41:41, 8mm & VHS, English, Arabic, French, and Hebrew (co-directed by Elia Suleiman), 1990 (1988)
- (Talaeen a Junuub)/Up to the South, 60:00, Hi-8 & Reg-8, BetacamSP final, Arabic, English and French (co-directed by Walid Raad), 1993 (1992)
- (This is Not Beirut) کان ها پا کان Kan Ya Ma Kan//There was and there was not, 49:00, Hi-8, VHS & 35mm orig., BetacamSP final, Arabic and English, Lebanon/USA/Canada, 1994 (1992)
- untitled part 1: everything and nothing, 40:40, DVM, Arabic and French with English subtitles, France/Canada (with Soha Bechara), 2001 (1999)
- untitled part 2: beauty and the east, 50:15, DVM. Former Yugoslavia (Bosnia-Herzegovina, Croatia, Macedonia, Serbia & Montenegro, Slovenia), Austria, USA, Canada, 2003 (1999)
- untitled part 3a: occupied territories, 23:00, DVM, Arabic with English subtitles, Lebanon/Canada,
- untitled part 3b: (as if) beauty never ends.., 11:12, Arabic with English subtitles, Lebanon/Canada, (2000, 1992, 1982, 2002)
- untitled part 4: terra (in)cognita, 37:30, DVM, N’Syilx’cen & English, Syilx (Okanagan), Canada, 2005
- untitled part 5: all is not lost but some things may have been misplaced along the way (or) of endings and beginnings and some points in-between, 113:00, DVM, Syilx (Okanagan) Territory, Canada
- untitled part 6: upon the resonance/weight of histories, 146:45, HD, Aotearoa/New Zealand (with Te Miringa Hohaia), 2010 (2009)
- untitled part 7.1: scenes/settings, 5:11, from: the heart that has no love/pain/generosity is not a heart (fragments), HD, 2010 (2008)
- untitled part 7.2: assembly, 14:13, from: the heart that has no love/pain/generosity is not a heart (fragments), Deri/Farsi & Hazaragi subtitled in English, HD, 2010 (2008)
- untitled part 7.3: shahnameh/band-e-amir, 30:30, from: the heart that has no love/pain/generosity is not a heart (fragments), Deri/Farsi & Hazaragi subtitled in English, HD, 2010 (2008)
- untitled part 7.4: cave interiors, 4:42, from: the heart that has no love/pain/generosity is not a heart (fragments), HD, 2010 (2008)
- untitled part 7.5: statue fragments, 6:16, from: the heart that has no love/pain/generosity is not a heart (fragments), HD, 2010 (2008)
- untitled part 8: esquina caliente, 11:55, Spanish with English subtitles, DVM, 2016 (2003)
- untitled part 9: this time, 6:13, Deri/Farsi & Hazaragi with English subtitles, Afghanistan/Canada, HD, 2020 (2008)

=== Installation, sculpture and photography projects ===
- nite/day photographs: San Francisco, Death Valley & area, silver gelatin photographs selenium toned, 1977–78
- thru the stillness that flies behind me.., 50 selenium toned silver gelatin prints, (1978-1979)
- SX-70 Polaroid & Type 58 & 59, Polacolor photographs, (1981-1982)
- Precarious Acquiescence, (1981-1983)
- "..The Ascent of Man.." (Acts of Consumption), dimensions variable, (1985-1988)
- recent maps & occurrent stages/progenous routes, from a group of 30 silver gelatin prints, (1980-1985)
- "... In the absence of heroes..." Part I: progenous routes, from a group of 55 chromogenic photographs, (1980-1983)
- "...In the absence of heroes..." Part III: Paradigmatic Shifts, 30" x 40" photographs, (1984)
- "...In the absence of heroes..." Part IV: Relentless Verity (Warfare/A case for context), ink & photographs, mixed media maquettes; prints courtesy, Public Archive Canada, (1984)
- Instant Design Predetermined Values, from A case for context. 8" x 10" Polaroid photographs, (1982)
- precarious acquiescence, 8.5" x 11" collage on letter paper pages, series, (1982)
- re-membering you (mute pictures), 8" x 10" painted/inked black and white photo reproductions and sound loop installation. Dimensions variable, (1987-1988)
- re-engagements, 16 x 20" chromogenic photographs from videotape with text superimposed, (1988)
- Stupid pleasures..., 20" x 24" (50.8 x 61 cm), Polaroid photographs with text, (1988-1989)
- untitled photographs: NYC (various titles: TO THE TRADE, 22 oz Thunderbolt, HOMEMADE CHOCOLATE, Neutral/Brakes/Steering, Ektacolour chromogenic photographs. Dimensions variable, (1988-2003)
- کان ها پا کان Kan ya ma Kan (There was and there was not), documents, reproductions, photographs, film, video, objects, acrylic, glass, dimensions variable, (1995-2005)
- (sites +) demarcations.., 75 – 16" x 20" chromogenic photographs with texts, (1992)
- map of the world, sculpture installation, documents, photographs, organic matter, drawings, objects, ink, tentest board. 98 x 144 inches (243.8 x 365.8 cm), (1999-2009)
- everything and nothing and other works from the ongoing project ‘untitled’, multi- channeled video installation, size variable, (2001-2009)
- untitled photographs: subjective affinities. Giclée photographs. Dimensions variable, (2003-)
- untitled photographs: location/dis-location(s), digital photographs. Dimensions variable, (2004-2013)
- the heart that has no love/pain/generosity is not a heart, digital inkjet photographs, video loops, paintings, drawings, objects, documents, (with Khadim Ali), (2008-2012)
- all is not lost but some things may have been misplaced along the way (or) of endings and beginnings and some points in-between, and other works from the ongoing videotape, untitled, 1999-ongoing, multi-channeled video installation, size variable, (2010)
- untitled photographs: location/dis-location(s): contingent promises, (2012-2013)
- Kan ya ma Kan (There was and there was not) (fragments), documents, reproductions, photographs, film, video, objects, acrylic, dimensions variable, (2013-2015)
- untitled photographs: location/dis-location(s): gleaning spaces, (2014)
- A history of photography, MKG127 Gallery, Toronto, (2016)
- untitled photographs: location/dis-location(s): beyond the pale, (2017)
- untitled photographs: location/dis-location(s): verisimilitude(s) and permutations, (2019)
- the heart that has no love/pain/generosity is not a heart (fragments), digital inkjet photographs, video loops, drawings, objects, documents, (2014-2015)
- torn paper sculptures: paper and photopaper, (2017-2020)

=== Public art ===
- man’oeuvre: 9 - 30" x 40" chromogenic photographs, original mirrored tiles, Cameron Public House, Toronto, (1985)
- May 17, 1998, outdoor forest-ruin photo and text installation at former Cornish Estate, Cold Spring, New York, (1988)
- Territory, Artspeak & Presentation House, 30 images displayed in City of Vancouver transit shelter back-lit signage spaces, curated by Melanie O'Brian & Helga Pakasaar, Vancouver, (1988)
- Footprints Community Art Project, sidewalk community mosaics, produced & designed "Heart of the City" mosaic at Main & Hastings St. and "memorial mosaic" at Oppenheimer Park, Downtown Eastside, desmedia collective, Vancouver, (2001)
- (un)classified materials: a public archives; present histories/history of the present, Vancouver Art Gallery (commission), (2005)
- Territory, Artspeak & Presentation House, 30 images displayed in City of Vancouver transit shelters, Vancouver, (2006)
- Coastal, 30 large scale location/dis-location(s) photographs in transit shelters, producer: City of Vancouver Public Art Commission, (2016)
- Cultural Perspectives, Seattle Municipal Tower Gallery, Seattle, (2016)
- ever close, Platforms 2020: Public Works: series of 4 image on 18 digital billboards, City of Vancouver public art commission
- beyond now, The Pandemic is a Portal, curated by cheyanne turions, SFU Galleries, Vancouver; BIPOC practices during Covid19, Ethnocultural Art Histories Research, Concordia University, Montréal; & Strength In Numbers, MKG127 Gallery, Toronto (online), (2020)

=== Performance ===
- '...In the absence of heroes...’: Part IV: Relentless Verity (Warfare/A case for context), Toronto, Winnipeg, Vancouver, (1984-1985)
- light-cone, San Diego & San Francisco, (1988)
- concretizing the ephemeral/ephemeralizing the concrete: throwing out ‘identity’ with the bathwater (and the tub) while carrying on in the bath, Vancouver & Bristol, England, (2002-2003)
- representing the unrepresentable: there is no Arab art, Zenith Foundation, Barbican Museum, London, England, (2004)
- autopsy of the oblique in a dissection of intent: images of death in a limited genealogy, University of South Florida, Tampa, (2004)
- sans titre/untitled, Université du Québec à Montréal, Montréal, (2004)
- human rights and self determination, University of British Columbia, Vancouver (2004)
- genealogy of the present: untitled, Alternator Gallery, Kelowa, (2005)
- interrupting orientalism: denying the trajectory, Centre A, SFU Theatre, Vancouver, (2008)
- representing the unrepresentable: subjective affinities I: Govett-Brewster Art Gallery, New Plymouth, New Zealand, (2008)
- representing the unrepresentable: subjective affinities III: We Declare/Flying University, Gallery Gachet, Vancouver, (2008)
- Framing Culture/Engaging Community, Production & Process Across the Great Divide or Subjective Affinities & where do you choose to place yourselves or be placed.., Simon Fraser University, Vancouver, (2010)
- subjective affinities: concretizing the ephemeral - a social convergence, Shift Symposium, Strandline Curatorial Collective, MacKenzie Art Gallery, Regina, (2011)
- tangible cartographiers: surviving the colonial/welcome to my house, (with Manuel Pina), Performing Utopias Conference, The University of British Columbia, Vancouver, (2014)
- secret agents.. working in/out of untitled photographs: location/dis-location(s): gleaning spaces, Carleton University, Ottawa, (2015)
