= Zeid Hamdan =

Lebanese music producer (born 1976)

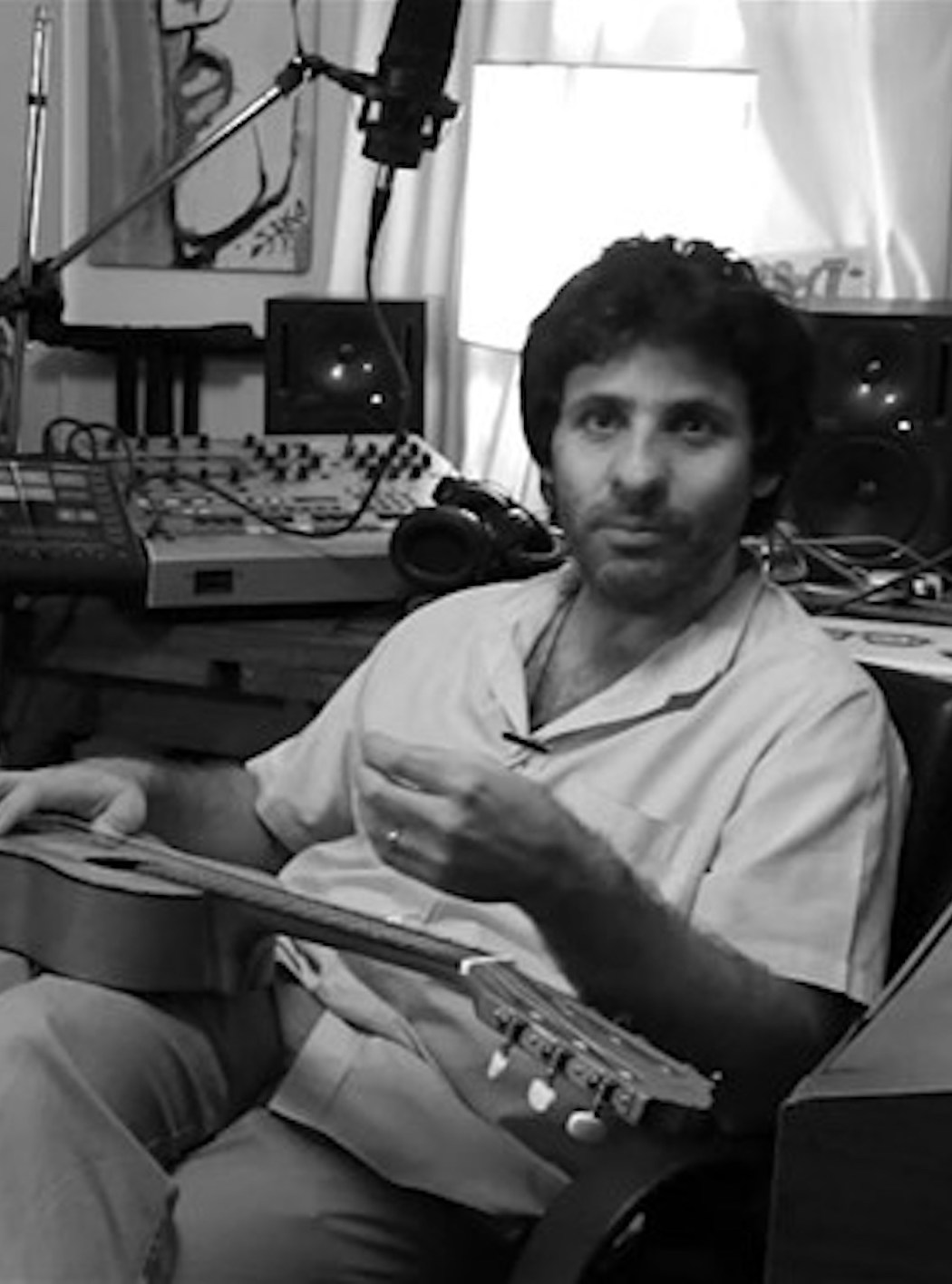

Background information
- Born: Zeid Hamdan; 24 July 1976 (age 49)
- Origin: Lebanon
- Genres: Electronica, trip hop, Arabic
- Occupations: Singer, Songwriter, Producer, Actor
- Instruments: Vocals, Guitar, Bass, Synthesizer
- Years active: 1990–present
- Label: www.lebaneseunderground.com
- Website: www.zeidhamdan.com

Zeid Hamdan is a Lebanese music producer. He was referred to as one of 8 leading lights in Lebanese culture by CNN. He has worked with many leading artists including, Soap Kills, The New Government, Katibe5, Shiftz, Hiba Mansouri, Kanjha Kora, Kazamada, Maryam Saleh, Maii Waleed, Dany Baladi, Zeid and the Wings (his own project) and recently Marie Abou Khaled, Tanjaret Daghet, Muhammad Abdullah from EL MORRABA3 and Lynn Adib.

In July 2011, Hamdan was arrested, reportedly for political sedition. He was detained over a song deemed insulting to President Michel Suleiman, a former army chief. Slandering the president carries a maximum two-year sentence in Lebanon. Officials reportedly took exception to the lyrics: 'General go home'. He was released the day after, and was told to "go home".

When the 2019 financial crisis hit Lebanon, Zeid Hamdan was about to release “the Beit Project” a collaboration with Tanjaret Daghet, Muhammad Abdullah from the Band “ El Morabba3” and himself. The project was due to be launched on 19 October, but demonstrations started on October 17, marking the beginning of the uprising in Lebanon.

At that period Zeid Hamdan had started to collaborate with Lynn Adib. They would meet regularly and record demos at Zeid's studio “Lebanese Underground Studio” in Geitawi, Beirut.

During this period the pandemic started worldwide and the lockdowns were an opportunity for Zeid to focus on the production work with Lynn Adib.

== Career ==
On April 30, 2020, they launched their first single “Taht el Ward” then a second single in June 2021 called “Ya man HAWA”.

He worked on Elie Saab film directed by Mounia AKL “The sacred source” released on Sept 10th working remotely with musicians Marc Codsi and Jeremie Reinier.

In September 2020 Zeid met singer songwriter Jeanne Humbert and they remotely recorded a remix of “Ana Be3chak El Bahr”. This collaboration would lead them to create a band with singer Celine Khoury called “Abaya Road”.

On 25 September he was invited by The Arab World Institute to perform in Paris to support the victims of the Port of Beirut blast.

In October 2020 he produced a remix for Palestinian artist Bashar Murad “Maskhara”.

In December 2020 during the Covid pandemic Bedouin Burger was able to tour in Switzerland.

After moving to France with his family on January 16, 2021, by coincidence he was hosted in a room just in front of a producer and tour manager called Valentin Langlois. Soon after they met Zeid and signed his project Bedouin Burger with his agency Helico

In March 2021, Zeid started producing the soundtrack of the documentary “Les Visages Oubliés de Palmyre”, a documentary produced for ARTE. The documentary was released in 2022.

Lynn Adib and Zeid Hamdan named their collaboration “Bedouin Burger" and started performing charity gigs online to support victims of the pandemic.

In March 2021 Zeid signed a publishing and recording deal for Bedouin Burger with a US/UAE company called reservoir media /pop Arabia. In May 2021, Zeid set up a music label “Beyt Music SAS “ which took its first project- curate and produce an event for the Arab World Institute in Paris. The event happened online on 21 June due to the ongoing Covid pandemic.

In June 2021, Zeid Hamdan wrote the additional score of the movie “Costa Brava” by Mounia Akl which includes a hit track sung by Nadine Labaki called “Beirut Hobbi" which was awarded at Cinemed festival in Montpellier.

In June 2021 Zeid was invited to perform at an event called “Mix Ta Race” hosted by Jeremie Fontaine. He met there with the musicians of the French band Arat Kilo. Later he was invited by 2 of Arat Kilo's members Fabien Girard and Samuel Hirsh to perform for a series of shows called “Live mag”.

In June 2021 Lynn Adib and Zeid Hamdan were invited to perform in Geneva with the contemporary ensemble from the “Haute école de musique“ and the Diwan ensemble. The show was called “Shawati” and was produced by the company “Ensemble Vide“. It was the second edition of the show. A third edition was later booked at the Ella Fitzgerald stage in Summer 2022.

In November 2021 Zeid started performing with Abaya Road. The repertoire consisted of remixes of Arabic and Turkish classics such as “Ana Be3chak El Bahr“, “Ah Ya Zein, “Saat Saat“ and “Ayrouni Bik”.

In December 2021 Zeid scored the music for the movie Dirty Difficult Dangerous by Wissam Charaf, the film was released in March 2022.

In December 2021 Bedouin Burger won the prize of the festival Musiques d'ici et d'ailleurs

In December 2021 Bedouin Burger was invited to perform at Global fest in New York which came along with an invitation to perform on NPR's live sessions Tiny desk. Due to the Covid pandemic the global fest was canceled, however the band recorded a Tiny desk session and it allowed the band to get booked in the US in summer and fall 2022.

In December 2021, Bedouin Burger finished recording their 1st Album for Pop Arabia.

The band started releasing track after track every few month. The first track released was “Dabkeh” in February 2022 then “zamel” in July 2022 then “Nomad” in November 2022.

In January 2022 Zeid was asked to remix the famous band “Tinariwen”. The song selected was “Alkhar Dessouf".

The remix was launched in May 2022 and was played on radio stations around the world.

In February 2022, Abaya Road was invited to perform at the “Beirut Electro parade“ it was the first serie of collaborations between Zeid Hamdan and Lebanese electric producer Hadi Zeidan.

In march 2022 Zeid went to Conakry, Guinea to produce for “Beyt Music", the first album of “Macky Saw”, a folk guitarist, composer and singer from Koundara, a village at the frontier of Senegal, Gambia and Mali.

Zeid had met Macky in 2009 when he was producing the artiste Kanjha Kora and had promised him he would come back with a record deal.

Valentin Langlois with Helico accepted to co-produce the album. Along with Benedicte Bos they went to Koundara, to sign and produce the artist. The album is expected to be released in June 2023.

In April 2022 Abaya Road was invited to perform at the Bipod festival in Lyon.

== Personal life ==
In July 2021 with the amplification of the financial crisis in Lebanon and the progressive deterioration of the infrastructures at every level, Zeid Hamdan decided to temporarily move with his family to Antalya on the Turkish coast. They then relocated to France on 16 January 2022.

== Discography ==
- Bedouin Burger "Taht El Ward" ( 2020)
- Muhammad Abdullah, Tanjaret Daghet, Zeid Hamdan

Beit (New Arabic pop) EP 2019

- Marie Abou Khaled(New Arabic pop)

Kermelak single (2018)

- Maii and Zeid (Egyptian indie pop)

Esmak Esmi single (2018) Firan Tagarob ep (2017) Ezaal ep (2015) Moga (2012)

- Maryam Saleh and Zeid Hamdan (Arabic electro pop)

[Halawella] (2014)

- Miles jay (Oriental )

[The Troposphere] (2013)

- Rakan Suleiman ( Electro punk )

[RED SULFUR] (2014) [Kazamada] (Arabic electro pop) EP UNRELEASED [Dany Baladi] (Arabic electro pop) LP UNRELEASED

- Kanjha Kora(Guineean Pop)

[La Guinee](2009) [The New Government](pop rock) The new Government EP (2004) The New Government LP (2005) [arty Animals] (2007) All in (2008)

- Katibe5 ( Arabic Hip hop)

[Ahla fik bil Moukhayamat] (2008) Shiftz (Arabic electro) Lebanese underground compilation (2006)

- Hiba Mansouri(Arabic trip hop)

[Ahwak] (2006)

=== With Zeid and the Wings ===
- [Mouhit] (2017)
- [Balekeh](2015)
- [Asfeh] (2012).
- [General Suleiman] – Single (2011).

=== With Soap Kills ===
- [Bater] (2001)
- [Cheftak] (2002)
- [Enta Fen] (2005)
