= Arabology (album) =

Studio album by Y.A.S.
- Released: 8 June 2009
- Genre: Electronic, synthpop, techno
- Label: AZ
- Producer: Mirwais

Yasmine Hamdan chronology
Arabology (2009)	Ya Nass (2013)

Singles from Arabology
- 1. "Get It Right" Released: 2009; 2. "Yaspop" Released: 2009

Arabology is the debut album by electronic duo Y.A.S., comprising ex-Soap Kills vocalist Yasmine Hamdan and ex-Taxi Girl keyboardist and producer of Madonna fame Mirwais Ahmadzai. The album was released in France on 8 June 2009. The lead single, "Get It Right", was released in June 2009.

The duo began recording the album in 2007. Mirwais Ahmadzaï wanted to create an electronic music album that had an Arab identity. Moreover, he wanted to present a different representation of Arab culture to balance the view of Arabs as "terrorists" often publicized in the Western media.

== Track listing ==
Aräbology
No.	Title	Writer(s)	Producer(s)	Length
1.	"Aräbology"	Mirwais Ahmadzai	Mirwais Ahmadzai	1:15
2.	"Get It Right"	Yasmine Hamdan; Ahmadzai	Ahmadzai	4:02
3.	"Yaspop"	Hamdan; Ahmadzai; Abdelouab Abrit	Ahmadzai	3:03
4.	"Oloulu"	Hamdan; Ahmadzai; Abrit	Ahmadzai	2:54
5.	"Da"	Hamdan; Ahmadzai; Abrit; Dave Treahearn; Rob Haggett	Ahmadzai; The Slips	2:44
6.	"Azza"	Hamdan; Ahmadzai; Abrit	Ahmadzai	3:02
7.	"Coït Me"	Hamdan; Ahmadzai; Abrit	Ahmadzai	3:45
8.	"Ma Rida"	Hamdan; Ahmadzai	Ahmadzai	3:43
9.	"Gamil"	Hamdan; Ahmadzai; Abrit	Ahmadzai	4:02
10.	"Fax"	Hamdan; Ahmadzai; Abrit	Ahmadzai	3:48
11.	"Mahi"	Hamdan; Ahmadzai; Abrit	Ahmadzai	2:51
12.	"A-Man"	Hamdan; Ahmadzai; Karl Bartos; Ralf Hütter	Ahmadzai	4:29

=== Samples ===
"A-Man" contains an excerpt from "The Man-Machine" as performed by Kraftwerk.

== Personnel ==
The following people contributed to Arabology:

- Yasmine Hamdan – vocals, vocal engineering
- Mirwais Ahmadzaï – keyboard, guitar, vocals, programming, engineering, mixing
- François Poggio – guitar
- Stephane Briat – vocal engineering
- Simon Davey – mastering
- Stéphane Sednaoui – photography

== Release history ==
The album was released in two versions: a single disc version, which used Opendisc technology to offer extras via a website, and a digital version which included a digital booklet.

Region	Date	Label	Format(s)	Catalog
France	8 June 2009	AZ	CD, digital download	531 733-1

== Charts ==
Chart (2009)	Peak position
French Albums Chart	79
