= Y.A.S. =

Electronic music duo from Paris

- Origin: France
- Genres: Electronic, synthpop, techno
- Years active: 2007–present
- Labels: AZ, Universal Music Group
- Members: Mirwais Ahmadzaï; Yasmine Hamdan
- Website: MySpace.com/YASPopMusic YasFans50.ir

Y.A.S. (pronounced "yas") is an electronic music duo, formed in 2007 in Paris, France, and consists of Mirwais Ahmadzaï (keyboard/guitar) and Yasmine Hamdan (vocals).

The duo began recording their debut album, Arabology, in 2007. Ahmadzaï wanted to create an electronic music album that had an Arab identity. Moreover, he wanted to present a different representation of Arab culture to balance the view of Arabs as "terrorists" often publicized in the Western media. The album was released in France and Belgium in June 2009 to positive reviews from music critics.

== Discography ==
=== Singles ===
- "Staying Alive" (2008)
- "Get It Right" (2009)
- "Yaspop" (2009)
